= Andy Leleisi'uao =

New Zealand Samoan artist (born 1969)

- Born: 1969 (age 56–57); Auckland, New Zealand
- Education: Auckland University of Technology
- Known for: painting
- Style: figurative paintings
- Awards: 2021 Senior Pacific Artist Award, 2017 Paramount Winner, 26th annual Wallace Art Awards

Andy Leleisi’uao (born 1969) is a New Zealand artist of Samoan heritage known for his modern and post-modern Pacific paintings and art. He was paramount winner at the 26th annual Wallace Art Awards in 2017 and awarded a Senior Pacific Artist Award at the Arts Pasifika Awards in 2021.

== Background ==
Leleisi’uao was born in 1969 New Zealand and grew up in Māngere, South Auckland. His parents were both born in Samoa. Pepe (Lalomauga, Upolu) and Savea Tuifa’asisina Tinou'amea (Palauli, Savai'i). Leleisi'uao has been a full time artist since 1996.

He was awarded a full scholarship at the Auckland University of Technology (AUT) School of Art and Design and received the first ever Pasifika Scholarship in 2000. In 2002 Leleisi’uao graduated with a Master of Fine Arts (with Honours).

He has served a number of art residencies including a Research Scholarship and an Artist in Residence at Macmillan Brown Centre for Pacific Studies (Christchurch), Casula Powerhouse Arts Centre (Sydney), BCA Gallery Residency (Cook Islands), McCahon House Residency (Auckland). Taipei Artist Village He spent three months in (Taiwan). Unitec Residency (Auckland), ISCP Residency (New York), Maria Valeria Residency (Slovakia), Māngere Arts Centre (Auckland).

It is said in his paintings that reoccurring motifs, "remind us of the inherent humanity of his creatures, and the universality of their struggle and endeavour within a limited existence". His visual language has changed over the years of his practice, in the late 1990s his paintings were highly politicized dealing with subjects such as prejudice and racism, poverty and youth suicide amongst Pacific Island populations in New Zealand. Since the 2000s his work utilises 'mythology and spiritualism' with 'fantastical creatures' although still drawing upon 'social dislocation'.

Leleisi’uao had almost 100 solo exhibitions including New York City. In 2009, Leleisi'uao had a solo exhibition Asefeka of the Unmalosa in Kips Gallery, Chelsea, New York. he returned to New York City in 2010 with the BCA group show MANUIA, co-curated by Mahiriki Tangaroa and Ben Bergman, exhibiting with artists Mike Tavioni, Michel Tuffery, Sylvia Marsters, Kay George, Jerome Shedden, and Mahikiri Tangaroa. In 2011, Leleisi'uao had a solo exhibition The Ufological City of New York with BCA Gallery (now Bergman Gallery) at VOLTA New York. In 2021, Leleisi'uao and Bergman Gallery participated in Tokyo International Art Fair, Japan

In 2017 he won the Wallace Art Awards including a six-month residency in New York the 'International Studio and Curatorial Programme'. and was awarded the Creative New Zealand Senior Pacific Art Award in 2021.

In May 2023, there was an exhibition of Leleisi'uao's work in Te Uru Waitākere Contemporary Gallery titled Unbeautiful Evening, where some of his damaged works were affected by the catastrophic 2023 Auckland Anniversary Weekend floods are displayed.

His art work is held in the collections of Christchurch Art Gallery, The Museum of New Zealand Te Papa Tongarewa, Auckland Art Gallery, Chartwell Trust, Arts House Trust, University of Auckland, Casula Powerhouse, Museum der Weltkulturen, University of Canterbury, Auckland Council and Pātaka Art + Museum.

== Awards ==
- 2017 - Paramount winner at the 26th annual Wallace Art Awards
- 2021 - Senior Pacific Artist Award - Arts Pasifika Awards - Creative New Zealand.

== Selected residencies ==
- 2018 – 5 months residency at International Studio & Curatorial Program (ISCP), New York, United States of America
- 2010 - McCahon House Artist Residency, McCahon Trust, Titirangi, Auckland, New Zealand
- 1999 - Research Scholarship at Macmillan Brown Centre for Pacific Studies, University of Canterbury
- 2010 - Asia New Zealand Foundation residency with the Taipei Artist Village, Taiwan

== Selected solo exhibitions ==
This is a small selection of exhibitions. By 2019 Leleisi'uao had already had 85 solo exhibitions, and many groups ones.

- 2024: Archipelago Area 51, Bergman Gallery, Rarotonga, Cook Islands
- 2023: Andy Leleisi'uao: Beautiful Evening, Te Uru Waitākere Contemporary Gallery, New Zealand
- 2021: An Uncanny Catharsis of Unrequited Bones’ - Artis Gallery, Parnell, New Zealand
- 2021: Consiliation Gatherers, Milford Galleries, Queenstown, New Zealand
- 2019: Andy Leleisi'uao, Bergman Gallery, Tokyo International Art Fair, Tokyo, Japan
- 2019: A Diasporic Pulse of Faith and Patience, Bergman Gallery, Rarotonga, Cook Islands
- 2019: KAMOAN MINE (survey exhibition), TSB Wallace Arts Centre, Pah Homestead, Auckland, New Zealand
- 2019: Embryonic Uslands, Milford Galleries, Dunedin, New Zealand
- 2018: Mangere Aroha, Bergman Gallery, Rarotonga, Cook Islands
- 2018: A Clouded Diaspora, Milford Galleries, Queenstown, New Zealand
- 2017: Untitled, Fresh Gallery, Ōtara, Auckland, New Zealand
- 2016: Ubiquitous People of Erodipolis, Milford Galleries, Dunedin, New Zealand
- 2015: Atmosphere People of Moana, Milford Galleries, Dunedin, New Zealand
- 2014: Waking up to the Obscurity People, Te Uru Gallery, Auckland, New Zealand
- 2014: Waking up to the Oculus People, Milford Galleries, Queenstown, New Zealand
- 2013: The Choirs of Lupotea, Milford Galleries, Dunedin, New Zealand
- 2012: Polyneitus Spring, Milford Galleries, Dunedin, New Zealand
- 2011: The Ufological City of New York, BCA Gallery (now Bergman Gallery), VOLTA New York, New York, United States of America
- 2011: The World of Erodipolis, Milford Galleries, Dunedin, New Zealand
- 2009: Asefeka of the Unmalosa, Kips Gallery, Chelsea, New York, United States of America
- 2006: Andy Leleisi'uao: Empowered Wallflower - Whitespace, Ponsonby, New Zealand
- 2005: Cheeky Darkie - Whitespace, Ponsonby (featuring miniature sculptures), New Zealand

== Selected group exhibitions ==
This is a small selection of exhibitions. By 2019 Leleisi'uao had already had 85 solo exhibitions, and many groups ones.

- 2024: Horizon 2, Bergman Gallery, Auckland, New Zealand
- 2024: South-Versed24, Mangere Arts Centre, Auckland, New Zealand
- 2023: Horizon, Bergman Gallery, Auckland, New Zealand
- 2023: South-Versed23, Depot Artspace, Auckland, New Zealand
- 2023: Tusiata o le Tala le Vavau: Artists of the Forever Stories, Mangere Arts Centre, Auckland, New Zealand
- 2022: Fa'atasi, Bergman Gallery, Rarotonga, Cook Islands
- 2022: Te Atuitanga - Beneath our Cloak of Stars, Bergman Gallery, Auckland, New Zealand
- 2019: The Big Blue, Bergman Gallery, Rarotonga, Cook Islands
- 2018: MPA1, Bergman Gallery, Rarotonga, Cook Islands
- 2017: Return to Havaiki, Bergman Gallery, Rarotonga, Cook Islands
- 2010: MANUIA, BCA Gallery (now Bergman Gallery) the American Indian Community House, New York, United States of America

== Book ==
- Andy Leleisi'uao: KAMOAN MINE (Bergman Gallery, TSB Wallace Arts Centre, Creative New Zealand, 2019)
