= Beachcomber Contemporary Art =

- Alternative names: BCA Gallery

General information
- Type: Commercial dealer gallery
- Address: Beachcomber Courtyard, Taputapuatea Rd, Avarua, Rarotonga
- Country: Cook Islands
- Coordinates: 21.20486°S 159.77275°W

Beachcomber Contemporary Art also known as BCA Gallery and Beachcomber Contemporary Art Gallery, is a commercial art gallery based in Rarotonga, Cook Islands. The gallery represented many significant international artists from New Zealand and the Cook Islands included Andy Leleisi'uao, Reuben Paterson, Michel Tuffery, Mahiriki Tangaroa, Sylvia Marsters, Mark Cross, and Hye Rim Lee, and Sam Thomas.

== History ==
Beachcomber Contemporary Art was Founded by artist and educator Joan Gragg in 2001, it was the first and only premier art gallery in Rarotonga, Cook Islands at the time, until the establishment of The Art Studio by Ian George and Kay George in Rarotonga. Beachcomber Contemporary Art existed between 2001 and 2015, and during that time, it participated regularly in the Auckland Art Fair and the VOLTA NY art fair.

In 2010, Ben Bergman co-curated under 'BCA Gallery' the exhibition MANUIA, featuring artists Mahiriki Tangaroa, Kay George, Michel Tuffery, Jerome Sheddon, and Michael Tavioni, in American Indian Community House in New York. The exhibition was opened by former New Zealand Prime Minister, and former UNDP Programme Administrator Helen Clark.

VOLTA NY exhibitions in New York included Andy Leleisi'uao, Ufological City (2011), Michel Tuffery, First Contact (2012), and Sylvia Marsters, New Yorkers Don't See Flowers (2014).

Beachcomber Contemporary Art regularly held residencies for New Zealand artists.

In 2016, Beachcomber Contemporary Art was transformed into Bergman Gallery under director Ben Bergman.

== Past residencies ==
- Mahiriki Tangaroa (2002)
- Andy Leleisi'uao (2009)
- Rick Welland (2010)
- Reuben Paterson (2010)
- Sylvia Marsters (2012)
- Sam Thomas (2013)
