= Sylvia Marsters =

New Zealand artist

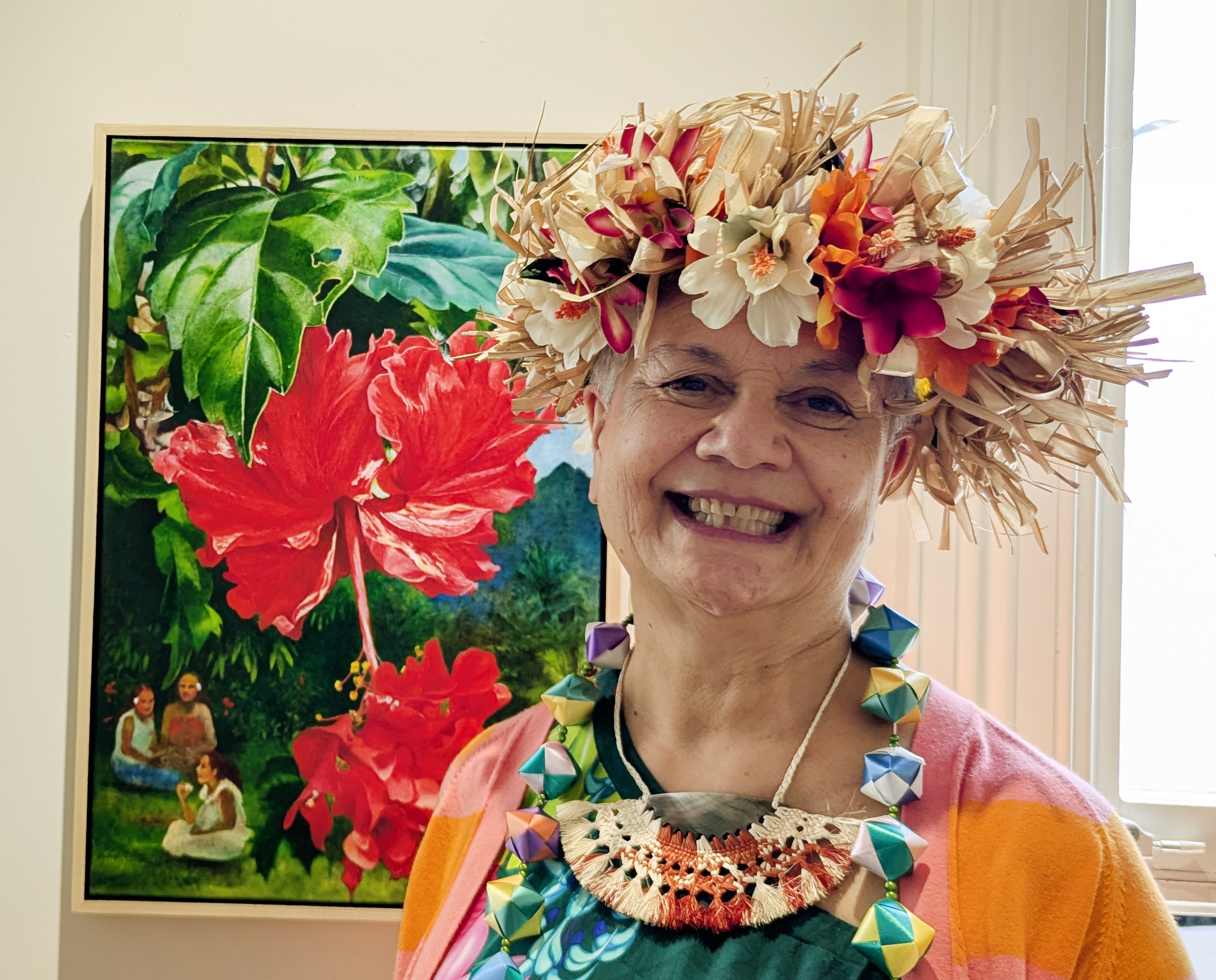
- Marsters in 2025
- Born: 1962 (age 63–64); Auckland, New Zealand
- Education: Auckland Seventh-day Adventist High School
- Known for: Painting
- Notable work: "New Yorkers Don't See Flowers", New York (2014)
- Style: Cook Islands flowers and everyday life
- Spouse: Early Marsters

Sylvia Lolita Catherine Marsters (née Tyler; born 1962) is a New Zealand artist of Cook Islands descent. Known for her paintings of flora, fauna, scenery and life in the Cook Islands, particularly hibiscus and gardenia flowers. In 2003, she received a residency in the Cook Islands from Creative New Zealand, and she has exhibited in Rarotonga many times since, as well as in New Zealand, Fiji and New York. Her exhibitions draw big crowds in the Cook Islands.

== Early life and family ==
Marsters was born in Auckland in 1962. Her father, David Tyler, was from Aitutaki, and he moved to New Zealand in 1952. She grew up in the Auckland suburb of Ōtara, and was educated at Auckland Seventh-day Adventist High School in Māngere Bridge. After leaving school, she worked as a machinist in a clothing factory, and attended evening art classes. She married Early Marsters, whose family came from Palmerston Island and Mangaia, and the couple established a sewing business based in their home, making casual and children's clothing incorporating Māori and Pasifika designs. It was reported by New Zealand Herald that Dame Kiri Te Kanawa owns one of Marsters' original paintings.

== Art career ==
Marsters was under tutelage of Lois McIvor in the beginning of Marsters' art career, and was encouraged by McIvor to pursue art. Marsters also helped her sister, a teacher, with art classes at her old school. She began exhibiting in about 1996, with the subject of her paintings being the flora, fauna, scenery and life in the Cook Islands, although she had never visited there until her Cook Islands Artist's Residency.

In 1998, Ian George curated Paringa Ou, the first major exhibition of contemporary art by Cook Island artists residing in New Zealand featuring artists such as Ani O'Neill, Sylvia Marsters, Mahiriki Tangaroa, Michel Tuffery, Jim Vivieaere, Ian George, and Kay George, the exhibition travelled to the Fiji Museum, the Cook Islands National Museum, as well as the Gus Fisher Gallery in Auckland. The exhibition was partly sponsored by the New Zealand High Commission in Rarotonga.

In 2003, the Pacific Arts Committee of Creative New Zealand awarded Marsters the Cook Islands Artist's Residency. During her three-month residency in Rarotonga, Marsters met art dealer Ben Bergman, and developed a close relationship that eventually led to her 2014 solo exhibition New Yorkers Don't See Flowers at VOLTA NY in New York City. Prior to VOLTA NY, Marsters was in a group exhibition, MANUIA, co-curated by Mahiriki Tangaroa and Ben Bergman in downtown New York City in 2010, exhibiting with artists Mike Tavioni, Michel Tuffery, Andy Leleisi'uao, Kay George, Jerome Shedden, and Mahikiri Tangaroa.

Following her residency in Rarotonga, Marsters returned and exhibited there many times, including an exhibition, E Moemoea Naku 2, was held there in 2023, celebrating 20 years of exhibiting in Rarotonga, Cook Islands. In 2024, Marsters returns to Rarotonga for her 100th exhibition titled 'E Kura Reitumanava no Rarotonga (Love letters for Rarotonga)'.

In July 2025, there was an exhibition titled To Tātou Mārāmā, Our Light, celebrating the Cook Islands’ 60 years of self-governance, featuring four senior Cook Islands women Mahiriki Tangaroa, Sylvia Marsters, Kay George and Joan Gragg. The exhibition was opened by Catherine Graham, New Zealand High Commission to the Cook Islands. Marsters' work was commentary of the evolving culture of the Cook Islands.

=== Residencies ===
- 2013: Pacific Showcase artist in residence, The Cloud, Auckland, New Zealand
- 2012: BCA Gallery Residency, Rarotonga, Cook Islands
- 2003: Cook Islands Artist's Residency by the Pacific Arts Committee of Creative New Zealand

=== Selected solo exhibitions ===
- 2025: Held Between Moments, Bergman Gallery, Auckland, New Zealand
- 2024: E Kura Reitumanava no Rarotonga (Love letters for Rarotonga), Bergman Gallery, Rarotonga, Cook Islands
- 2023: E Moemoea Naku 2, Bergman Gallery, Rarotonga, Cook Islands
- 2022: E Moemoea Naku - A Dream of Mine, Bergman Gallery, Auckland, New Zealand
- 2014: New Yorkers don’t see Flowers, BCA Gallery, VOLTA New York, United States
- 2012: Island Fever, BCA Gallery, Rarotonga, Cook Islands
- 2003: Te Ruperupe O Toku Ipukarea, Cook Islands National Museum

=== Selected group exhibitions ===
- 2025: Pygmalion Touch, West Coast Gallery, Auckland, New Zealand
- 2025: To Tātou Mārāmā, Our Light, Bergman Gallery, Rarotonga, Cook Islands
- 2025: Aotearoa Art Fair, Viaduct Events Centre, Auckland, New Zealand
- 2024: Aotearoa Art Fair, Viaduct Events Centre, Auckland, New Zealand
- 2023: Te Vaerua O Te Va'ine - Our Mother's Hands, Bergman Gallery, Auckland, New Zealand
- 2022: Te Atuitanga Beneath Our Cloak of Stars, Bergman Gallery, Auckland, New Zealand
- 2021: The Scent of two lands, Arthaus Contemporary, Auckland, New Zealand
- 2010: MANUIA, BCA Gallery, the American Indian Community House, New York, United States
- 2008: Cross-Currents, Matakana Gallery, Matakana, New Zealand
- 2007: Te Manea O Rarotonga, Reef Gallery, Auckland, New Zealand
- 2007: Pacific Rhythm, Waiheke Art Gallery, Auckland, New Zealand
- 2006: Frangipani Lush, The Edge/Aotea Centre, Auckland, New Zealand
- 1998: Paringa Ou, Cook Islands National Museum, Rarotonga, Cook Islands
- 1998: Paringa Ou, Fiji Museum, Suva, Fiji
- 1998: Paringa Ou, Gus Fisher Gallery, Auckland, New Zealand
