= Rhea Maheshwari =

Indian New Zealand artist (born 1993)

- Born: 1993 (age 32–33); Mumbai, India
- Education: University of Auckland, Auckland University of Technology
- Known for: painting
- Style: dreamscape, tapestry

Rhea Maheshwari (born 1993, Mumbai, India) is an Indian and New Zealand artist notable for her colour palette of blues and purples coloured dreamscapes. She primarily creates large-scale ornamental paintings that resemble tapestries. Maheshwari also draws inspiration from 17th- and 18th-century Mughal miniatures, especially their decorative and ornamental elements.

== Biography ==
Maheswari arrived in New Zealand as a child with her family from Mumbai. The exhibition Kiss Taraf (2023) at The Art Paper headquarters represents her journey in New Zealand as she discovers authentic ways to express herself. Maheswari highlights the challenges faced by Asian artists in New Zealand who encounter resistance from both their families and the art world. She said. "There are so many things working against you, including family members who misunderstand our artistic pursuits." and "You have to grapple with the feeling of being an outsider and make it a part of your life journey of creating art."

Maheshwari has exhibited extensively throughout New Zealand, including Corban Estate Arts Centre, Depot Artspace, Bergman Gallery, Broker Gallery, Pah Homestead, Mairangi Arts Centre, and The Physics Room.

== Selected solo exhibitions ==
- 2024 – amor fabrica, Bergman Gallery, Auckland, New Zealand
- 2023 – Ethereal Cosmography, Depot Artspace, Auckland New Zealand
- 2020 – Aerial Architecture, Queenstown Contemporary, Queenstown, New Zealand

== Selected group exhibitions ==
- 2024 – Aaj kal, Centre of Contemporary Art, Christchurch, New Zealand
- 2024 – Tapestry of Time, MAG Contemporary, New Delhi, India
- 2024 – Belonging: Stories of Contemporary New Zealand Asian Artists, Bergman Gallery, Auckland, New Zealand
- 2024 – Aotearoa Art Fair, Bergman Gallery, Viaduct Events Centre, Auckland, New Zealand
- 2024 – Yahaan, Corban Estate Arts Centre, Auckland, New Zealand
- 2023 – Five Painters, Bergman Gallery, Auckland, New Zealand
- 2023 – A Place to Call Home - Contemporary New Zealand Asian Art, Bergman Gallery, Auckland, New Zealand
- 2023 – Kiss Taraf, The Art Paper, Auckland, New Zealand
- 2022 – At First Glance, Mairangi Arts Centre, Mairangi, New Zealand
- 2021 – Apple, Banana, Star (Emoji), Broker Gallery, Queenstown, New Zealand
- 2020 – Conditioner, Pah Homestead, Auckland, New Zealand
- 2019 – Two Oceans at Once, The Physics Room, Christchurch, New Zealand
