= Mark Cross (artist) =

New Zealand artist (born 1955)

Mark Cross (born 1955, Auckland), is a contemporary artist and painter from New Zealand, based in Niue, but travels regularly to Auckland. His works are held in museums and galleries in New Zealand.

== Early life and career ==
Mark Cross was born in 1955 in Auckland. He started his painting career when he was in his twenties. At the age of 23, he moved with his family to Liku, Niue. In order to find a market for his work, he returned to New Zealand in 1982. Employing elements of the natural landscape, foreshore imagery and the human figure, his artwork imparts an ecological message regarding the human condition and its relationship with the environment. In collaboration with other artists, he founded the Hikulagi Sculpture Park in Niue's rainforest in 1996. In collaboration with the author Brad Matsen, he co-authored the book Have We Offended?, a collection of Mark Cross' work, produced by the John Leech Gallery.

== Selected exhibitions ==
=== Solo ===
- 2013: Sienna Palette, Pierre Peeters Gallery
- 2012: Works in Transit, Pierre Peeters Gallery, Auckland.
- 2005: Sheep Country., Real Gallery, Auckland
- 2004: Heta: Power and Fragility, Photographs SOCA gallery Auckland and the Whangarei Art Museum
- 2003: Recent Works, John Leech Gallery, Auckland
- 2002: Have We Offended, Te Manawa, Museum and Art Gallery, Palmerston North
- 2002: Cook Islands National Museum, Cook Islands
- 1998: Haleiwa Gallery, Hawaii
- 1997: Woodcuts, John Leech Gallery, Auckland
- 1996: Premier Gallery, Hawaii
- 1995: Life Stills, John Leech Gallery, Auckland
- 1993: Anomalies, John Leech Gallery, Auckland
- 1991: John Leech Gallery, Auckland

=== Group ===
- 2010: Connect Gallery, Wil, Switzerland
- 2003: Exiles in Paradise, With Mahiriki Tangaroa, Beachcomber Contemporary Art Gallery (now Bergman Gallery), Rarotonga
- 2002: Tulana Mahu Installation, Cook Island National Museum
- 2000: Tulana Mahu Installation, Sydney Olympic Arts Festival, Australia
- 1995: Drawings; Joint exhibition with John Pule, The Lane Gallery, Auckland
- 1996: Nukututaha: Art From Niue, The Lane Gallery Auckland
- 1993–1994: Real Vision; Robert McDougall Art Gallery, Christchurch
- 2024: Wong and Cross; Joint exhibition with Brent Wong, Boyd-Dunlop Gallery, Napier, New Zealand
