= ASDAH =

The abbreviation ASDAH may refer to:

- Auckland Seventh-day Adventist High School
- Association of Seventh-day Adventist Historians
