= Lucas Grogan =

Australian artist

- Born: 1984 (age 41–42); Cooma, Australia
- Education: Newcastle University
- Known for: painting, textile
- Style: blue and white artworks

Lucas Grogan (born 1984) is an Australian artist born in Cooma, New South Wales. Grogan is a painter and textile artist currently based in Melbourne, Australia. Grogan exhibited overseas and Australia since 2005.

== Art career ==
Grogan grew up in Maitland, and consider Maitland his hometown. Grogan left Maitland and studied art at Newcastle University in 2003 to base himself in Melbourne. According to Grogan, he "failed spectacularly", but learned on the job about life as a practising artist via volunteer and paid jobs at artist-run and commercial galleries in Newcastle and Sydney as gallery attendant to exhibition installer and floor manager. His career took off in 2008 when he was featured in Biennale of Sydney at the age of 24 with his two toned paintings and embroidered textiles.

In 2020, he had a retrospective of his work in Maitland Regional Art Gallery. His style is almost always blue and white colours in his paintings and textile art. Grogan's inspirations and influences includes islamic motifs and patterns in his geometric line-work to traditional Aboriginal paintings. Grogan also used text in his art, using sarcastic quotes that jump out at the viewer which can be famous, overheard and everyday sayings. Many of the phrases are from the style of text messaging. On his use of texts, Grogan said, “They are sarcastic, but at times they’re also painfully honest and sincere.” All his texts and intricately detailed patterns are painted freehand.

Grogan has shown in Australia and internationally such as Paris, New York, Hong Kong, Auckland, Rarotonga and London. Grogan received Red Gate residency in Beijing, and completed major murals commissions in Bali, Newcastle, Melbourne and Perth.

His works are in private and public collections across Australia, including National Gallery of Australia, Newcastle Art Gallery, Art Gallery of Ballarat, Wesfarmers, Deutsche Bank, Maitland Regional Art Gallery, and Ararat Gallery.

=== Residencies ===
- 2013: Artist in Residence, Red Gate, Beijing, China
- 2013: Harvested Workshop Residency, Melbourne, Australia
- 2012: Australian Tapestry Workshop Residency, Melbourne, Australia

=== Selected solo exhibitions ===
- 2023: Lucas Grogan: Cabinets, Hugo Michell Gallery, Adelaide, Australia
- 2021: Lucas Grogan: A Short Sharp Thread, Martin Browne Contemporary, Paddington, Sydney, Australia
- 2020: Long Story Short, Maitland Regional Art Gallery, New South Wales, Australia
- 2020: Lucas Grogan: Last Last Night, Hugo Michell Gallery, Adelaide, Australia
- 2019: Lucas Grogan: Groundbreakingflorals, Martin Browne Contemporary, Paddington, Sydney, Australia
- 2018: Lucas Grogan: Bedrooms, Yavuz Gallery, Singapore
- 2017: Lucas Grogan: Skies, Turner Galleries, Northbridge, Australia
- 2017: Lucas Grogan: Thought & Prayers, Hugo Michell Gallery, Adelaide, Australia

=== Selected group exhibitions ===
- 2024: Lucas Grogan and Luke Thurgate: Heralds, Bergman Gallery, Auckland, New Zealand
- 2024: Aotearoa Art Fair, Bergman Gallery, Viaduct Events Centre, Auckland, New Zealand
- 2023: Holy SMokes, Backwoods Gallery, Collingwood, Australia
- 2023: Pride & Prejudice, Part 1, Bergman Gallery, Auckland, New Zealand
- 2018: The Big Blue, Bergman Gallery, Rarotonga, Cook Islands
- 2017: Slipstitch, Mosman Art Gallery, Sydney, Australia
- 2017: Sydney Contemporary, Yavuz Gallery, Sydney, Australia
- 2017: Art Basel Hong Kong, Yavuz Gallery, Hong Kong
- 2016: Antipodean, Yavuz Gallery, Singapore
- 2014: These Works, Salon Zücher, Paris, France
- 2014: Melbourne Art Fair, Gallerysmith, Melbourne, Australia
- 2013: Sacred/Iconic, Garis & Hahn, New York, United States of America
- 2013: Wonderworks, The Cat Street Gallery, Hong Kong
- 2005: Yellow Socks Brigade (with Luke Thurgate), Watt Space Gallery, Newcastle, Australia
