= Thurgate =

Thurgate is a surname. Notable people with the surname include:

- Angus Thurgate (born 2000), Australian soccer player
- Luke Thurgate (fl. 2005), Australian artist
