= Joan Gragg =

Cook Island artist and educator

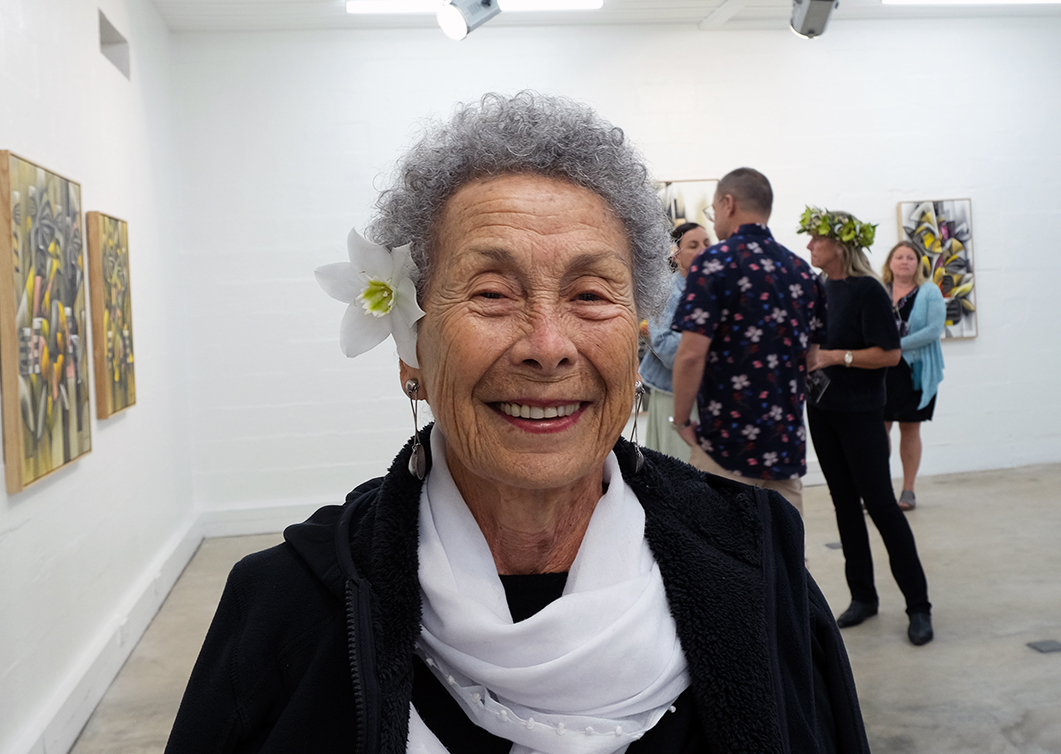
- Gragg, 2026
- Born: Joan Elisabeth Gragg; 1943 (age 82–83); Rarotonga, Cook Islands
- Education: Auckland University of Technology
- Known for: painting, drawing
- Notable work: The Nuku (2008)
- Style: everyday life of the Cook Islands

Joan Elisabeth Gragg (also Joan Rolls-Gragg, Joan Rolls Gragg; born 1943) is a senior artist and educator from the Cook Islands, with painting career spanning five decades. She founded the Cook Islands' first and only premier art gallery, Beachcomber Contemporary Art (now Bergman Gallery), in 1991. Gragg graduated with a Master of Art and Design degree from Auckland University of Technology in 2010. There was an opportunity for Gragg to work towards a doctorate in art but she has discounted that for the meantime.

Gragg's practice centres on the changes to everyday life in the Cook Islands, exploring changes over the decades, with people drifting further apart with the introduction of new technology such as new forms of transportation as opposed to walking, and single plastic chairs instead of traditional wooden benches. According to Gragg, she aims to showcase the "joy, camaraderie, love, and all the other great things that happen in a community in the Cook Islands", and to visually express the humour of the Cook Islands through her art. Gragg also stated she enjoys painting the beauty of everyday life in the Cook Islands. In 2024, Gragg was featured in Aotearoa Art Fair.

In February 2025, a book on Marjorie Crocombe was published, Gragg and Tricia Thompson both noted Marjorie’s significant contributions to Cook Islands Māori language's preservation and education. The book was decorated with paintings by Gragg and Mahiriki Tangaroa.

In July 2025, there was an exhibition titled To Tātou Mārāmā, Our Light, celebrating the Cook Islands’ 60 years of self-governance, featuring four senior Cook Islands women Mahiriki Tangaroa, Sylvia Marsters, Kay George and Joan Gragg. The exhibition was opened by Catherine Graham, New Zealand High Commission to the Cook Islands. Gragg's work was a response to her childhood in Australia when she first heard about the announcement of Cook Island's self-governance.

Gragg has been exhibited extensively in the Cook Islands, as well as in New Zealand. Her work is held in numerous private and major public collections throughout the Cook Islands as well as New Zealand. Such as Cook Islands National Museum, University of the South Pacific, and the Belinda Fletcher Collection.

== Selected solo exhibitions ==
- 2023: The Nuku, Bergman Gallery, Rarotonga, Cook Islands
- 2021: Underneath the Mango Tree, Bergman Gallery, Rarotonga, Cook Islands
- 2011: Patia Te Pere, BCA Gallery, Rarotonga, Cook Islands
- 2010: Seeing the Funny Side, Cook Islands National Museum, Rarotonga, Cook Islands

== Selected group exhibitions ==
- 2025: To Tātou Mārāmā, Our Light, Bergman Gallery, Rarotonga, Cook Islands
- 2024: Aotearoa Art Fair, Viaduct Events Centre, Auckland, New Zealand
- 2024: Autumn Selection, Bergman Gallery, Auckland, New Zealand
- 2023: Ta Mataora, Bergman Gallery, Rarotonga, Cook Islands
- 2023: Horizon, Bergman Gallery, Auckland, New Zealand
- 2020: Tatou 2, The Story of Us, Bergman Gallery, Rarotonga, Cook Islands
- 2002: Aue Te Mataora, BCA Gallery, Rarotonga, Cook Islands
