= Kay George =

New Zealand and Cook Islands artist

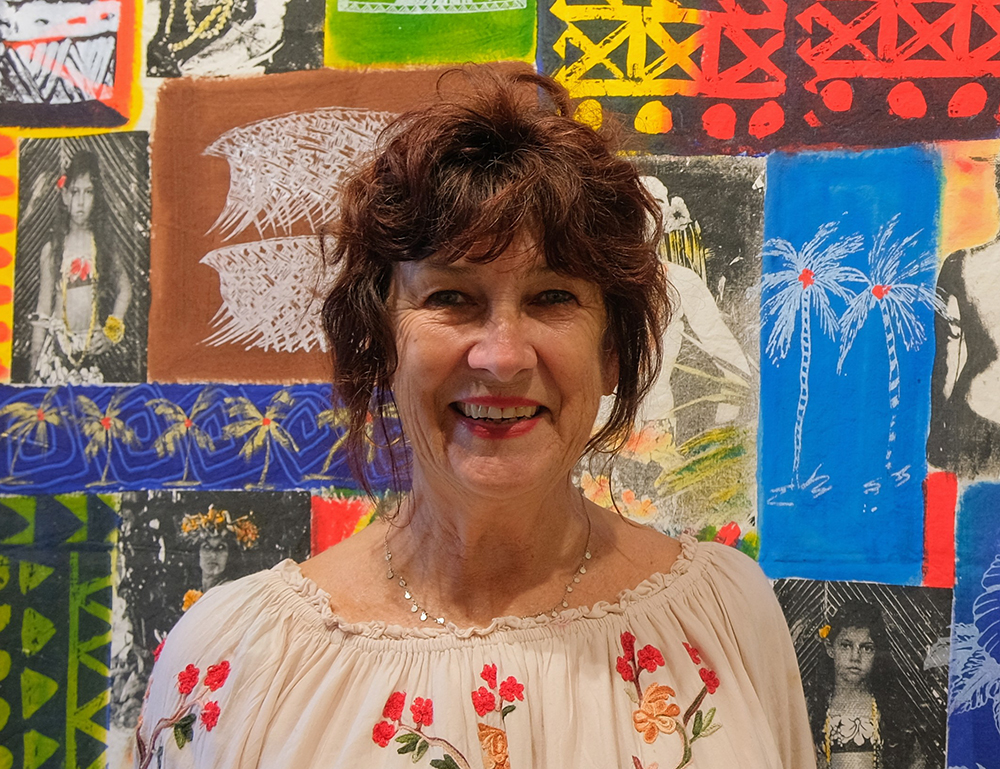
- Kay George, 2024
- Born: 1954 (age 71–72); Rotorua, New Zealand
- Education: Auckland University of Technology
- Known for: painting, printing, photography
- Style: colourful collage of Cook Islands imagery
- Spouse: Ian George
- Children: Mīria George

Kay George (born 1954, Rotorua, New Zealand) is a senior New Zealand and Cook Islands artist based in Rarotonga, Cook Islands. George is a major player in the development of the visual arts in the Cook Islands.

George and her husband Ian George, also a notable artist himself, migrated to Rarotonga, Cook Islands from New Zealand so her husband can explore his family's heritage in the Cook Islands. George and her husband ran an art gallery named The Art Studio for many years, (now Beluga Cafe), in Arorangi. The Art Studio was recognised as one of the leading galleries in the Pacific.

In 1998, Ian George curated Paringa Ou, the first major exhibition of contemporary art by Cook Island artists residing in New Zealand featuring artists such as Ani O'Neill, Sylvia Marsters, Mahiriki Tangaroa, Michel Tuffery, Jim Vivieaere, Ian George, and Kay George, the exhibition travelled to the Fiji Museum, the Cook Islands National Museum, as well as the Gus Fisher Gallery in Auckland. The exhibition was partly sponsored by the New Zealand High Commission in Rarotonga.

In 2008, She graduated Masters of Art and Design from Auckland University of Technology with Cook Islands scholarship.

In 2010, George was part of the exhibition MANUIA with Mahiriki Tangaroa, Michel Tuffery, Jerome Sheddon, and Michael Tavioni, in American Indian Community House in New York. The exhibition was curated by Ben Bergman and was opened by former New Zealand Prime Minister, and former UNDP Programme Administrator Helen Clark.

In 2018, celebrating 30 years since George's arrival to the Cook Islands, Bergman Gallery hosted her retrospective exhibition and 200 people attended the opening.

In 2025, there was an exhibition titled To Tātou Mārāmā, Our Light, celebrating the Cook Islands’ 60 years of self-governance, featuring four senior Cook Islands women Mahiriki Tangaroa, Sylvia Marsters, Kay George and Joan Gragg. The exhibition was opened by Catherine Graham, New Zealand High Commission to the Cook Islands. George's work was layering memories and documenting evolving culture of the Cook Islands.

Her work are exhibited internationally in Cook Islands, Australia, New Zealand, France, United States of America, New Caledonia and Fiji. Her stepdaughter Mīria George, is a New Zealand writer, producer and director.

== Selected solo and collaborative exhibitions ==
- 2024: Beyond the Veil of Paradise, Bergman Gallery, Auckland
- 2018: Years of Colour, Bergman Gallery, Rarotonga, Cook Islands
- 1997: Ian and Kay George, Morgan Street Gallery, Auckland, New Zealand
- 1997: 2 Women Show (with Andrea Eimkee), Darwin, Australia

== Selected group exhibitions ==
- 2025: To Tātou Mārāmā, Our Light, Bergman Gallery, Rarotonga, Cook Islands
- 2025: Aotearoa Art Fair, Viaduct Events Centre, Auckland, New Zealand
- 2020: Tatou 2, The Story of Us, Bergman Gallery, Rarotonga, Cook Islands
- 2013: Oe Vaka, The Art Studio, Rarotonga, Cook Islands
- 2010: MANUIA, BCA Gallery (now Bergman Gallery), Indian Nation Community House, New York City, United States of America
- 1998: Paringa Ou, Fisher Gallery, Auckland, New Zealand
- 1998: Paringa Ou, Fiji Museum, Fiji
- 1998: Paringa Ou, Cook Islands National Museum, Rarotonga, Cook Islands
