= Luke Thurgate =

Australian painter and mural artist

- Education: National Art School; University of Newcastle
- Known for: Painting and drawing

Luke Thurgate is an Australian painter and mural artist.

== Early life and education ==
Luke Thurgate graduated with Bachelor of Fine Arts from University of Newcastle, Australia in 2007, and went on to do a Masters of Fine Arts at the National Art School, where he also teaches drawing.

== Career ==
Thurgate's extensive exhibition history in Australia and New Zealand including exhibitions at Burra Regional Art Gallery, Bergman Gallery, Backwoods Gallery, National Art School, Adelaide Central Gallery, M.Contemporary, Mop Project Space, John Miller Gallery, Watt Space Gallery and John Paynter Gallery.

His works are often featured in LGBTQIA+ festivals and events such as Sydney Mardi Gras, Sydney WorldPride, and Auckland Pride Festival.

== Recognition ==
In 2009, Thurgate was a finalist in the Dobell Drawing Prize. In 2020, he was a finalist in the Tom Bass Figurative Sculpture Prize and the Jacaranda Acquisitive Drawing Award.

Thurgate's finalist 2019 Dobell Drawing Prize entry was featured in The Guardian. His finalist 2023 Dobell Drawing Prize was a performance piece drawn on the opening night, a big mural that is semi-permanent, where it was eventually covered with wall paint, and no traces of the drawing would remain. This is common with Thurgate's work, where it is drawn on the walls with charcoal and displayed for a limited time only.

=== Residencies ===
- 2018: The Burra Archive, Burra Regional Art Gallery
- 2017: Seymour College, Adelaide
- 2017: Royal Australian and New Zealand College of Psychiatrists, Adelaide
- 2015: Artlab Australia, Adelaide
- 2005: Rocket Art, Antique Boys Artist in Residence, Newcastle

== Collections ==
Thurgate's works are in numerous private and public collections, including National Art School, Maitland Regional Art Gallery, Macquarie University, University of South Australia, Catherine Croll Collection, and Alex Seton Collection.

== Exhibitions ==
=== Selected solo and collaborative exhibitions ===
- 2024: Lucas Grogan and Luke Thurgate: Heralds, Bergman Gallery, Auckland, New Zealand
- 2023: Dress Code, .M Contemporary, Darlinghurst, Australia
- 2023: Adore You, Sydney WorldPride, NAS Gallery, Sydney, Australia
- 2022: Lisa Jones & Luke Thurgate, .M Contemporary, Darlinghurst, Australia
- 2018: The Burra Archive, Burra Regional Art Gallery, Australia
- 2016: Face Off, Floating Goose Studios, Adelaide, Australia
- 2016: Efface (with Chelsea Lehmann), Strange Neighbour Gallery, Melbourne, Australia
- 2010: How to Draw Sex, Violence and Death the Luke Thurgate Way, Firstdraft, Sydney, Australia
- 2005: Yellow Socks Brigade (with Lucas Grogan), Watt Space Gallery, Newcastle, Australia

=== Selected group exhibitions ===
- 2024: Aotearoa Art Fair, Bergman Gallery, Viaduct Events Centre, Auckland, New Zealand
- 2023: Sydney Contemporary Art Fair, M.Contemporary, Sydney, Australia
- 2023: Holy Smokes, Backwoods Gallery, Collingwood, Australia
- 2023: Pride & Prejudice, Part 1, Bergman Gallery, Auckland, New Zealand
- 2010: Labelled Queer, Maitland Regional Art Gallery, Maitland, Australia
- 2017: The Drawing Exchange, Adelaide Central School of Art & National Art School, Australia
- 2015: Adorn, Adelaide Central Gallery, Adelaide, Australia
- 2014: Gematria, Adelaide Central Gallery, Adelaide, Australia
