= Pisupo Lua Afe (Corned Beef 2000) =

Pop art sculpture created by Michel Tuffery

- Corned Beef 2000 (English)
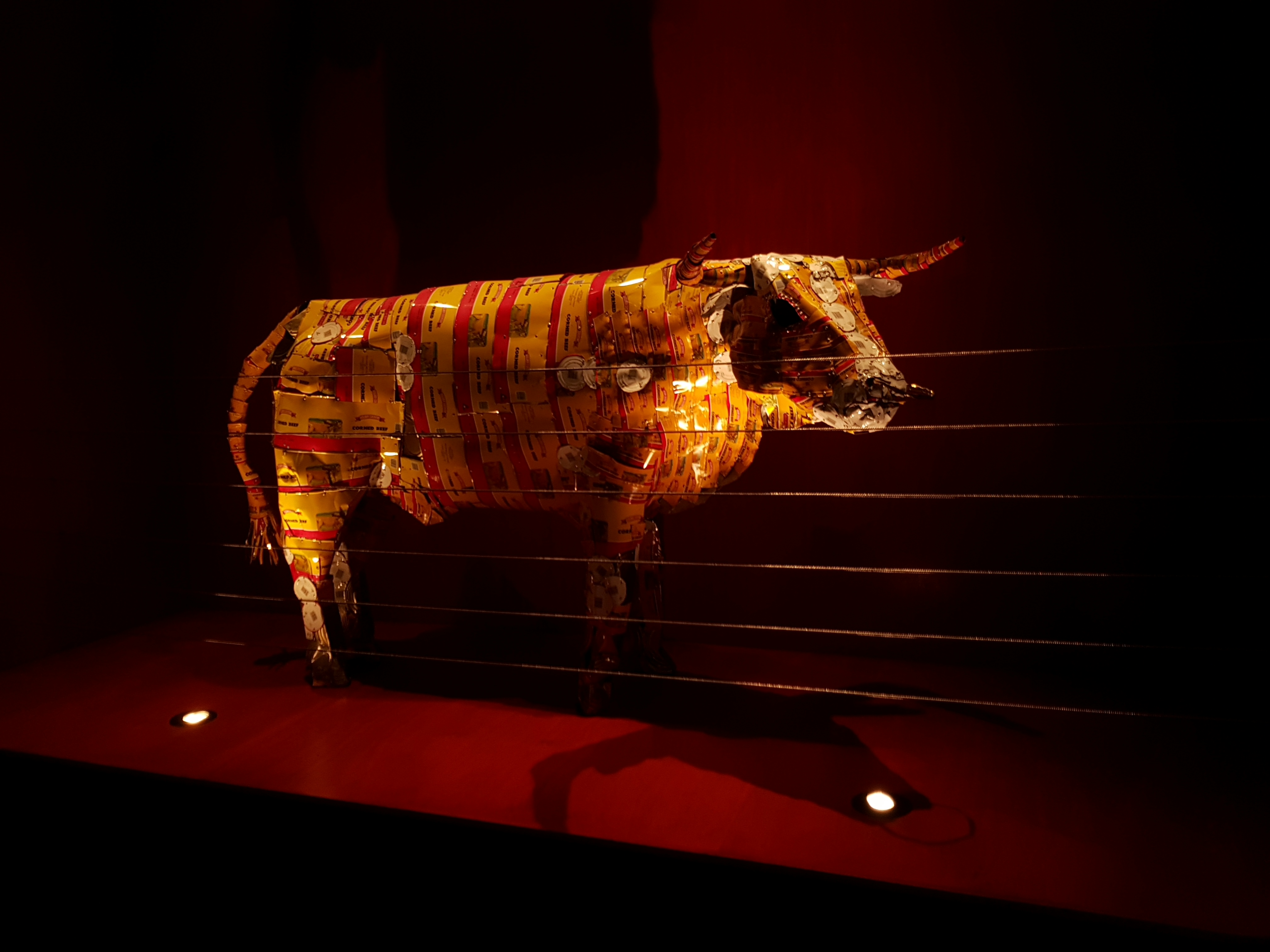
- Artist: Michel Tuffery
- Year: 1994
- Type: Sculpture
- Medium: Tin, rivets
- Movement: Pop art
- Dimensions: 1150 mm × 650 mm (45 in × 26 in)
- Location: Te Papa Tongarewa; Wellington

Pisupo Lua Afe (Corned Beef 2000) is a pop art sculpture created by the New Zealand artist Michel Tuffery in 1994. It is the first in a series of tin animals, made from the packaging of foods common in Samoa. Addressing his Samoan heritage, neocolonialism and the distress of indigenous peoples in the Pacific, it is one of his most celebrated works.

"Does foreign intervention encourage cultural and economic independence - or dependence?" was the question posed by Tuffery when the sculpture was unveiled at the exhibition Bottled Ocean, curated by Jim Vivieaere, at City Gallery Wellington in 1994. A pop art sculpture unique to the predominately Western art movement, Pisupo Lua Afe consists of a bull made of hundreds of tinned corned beef cans held together by rivets. The artwork addresses the plight of traditional Samoan cuisine and health due to the introduction of pisupo- unhealthy, commercial tinned food- by Europeans. (Note: Tinned food was introduced to Samoa over a hundred years ago, but only in the form of pea soup ab initio. Therefore, the word for tinned food was "Pisupo", a Samoanised version of the English for "Pea Soup". The name became ubiquitous for all tinned food as more and more varieties were introduced to the country, and now it is more or less confined to tinned meat.) Now a major part of Samoan culture, foreign-produced pisupo such as corned beef has become ubiquitous across their communities both in Samoa and across the diaspora, with gifting of these items customary at weddings and birthdays. This unhealthy dependence on predominately New Zealand, Australian and American companies is inherently neocolonial in nature, showing how much lobbying power New Zealand still has in Samoa almost 60 years since independence.

Tuffery aimed to portray Samoans as courageous despite the power that white-owned foreign food manufacturers wield. The bull is both representative of the animal corned beef comes from (and the environmental impact it has in Samoa, an especially climate crisis-vulnerable country), and the strength of the Samoan people to overcome colonialism. The work is on display at Te Papa Tongarewa, New Zealand's national museum and the 72nd-most visited art museum in the world.

== Description ==
Taking an influence from pop art, the work consists of a bull made of hundreds of tinned corned beef cans held together by rivets. Pisupo Lua Afe concerns New Zealand's questionable trade practices across the South Pacific, where it wields significant influence as a regional power. For Tuffery, corned beef (or pisupo in Samoan) (Note: Tinned food was introduced to Samoa over a hundred years ago, but only in the form of pea soup ab initio. Therefore, the word for tinned food was "Pisupo", a Samoanised version of the English for "Pea Soup". The name became ubiquitous for all tinned food as more and more varieties were introduced to the country, and now it is more or less confined to tinned meat.) is representative of the high-fat, unhealthy foods foreign companies have introduced to Samoa. These foods have led to disproportionately high incidences of diabetes and heart disease in Pacific Island populations, as diets formerly high in locally grown fruits and vegetables, seafood, coconut milk and flesh, have given way to cheap, imported foodstuffs. Neocolonialism is addressed here via the choice of corned beef; after Samoa's independence from New Zealand in 1962, food businesses in the latter country have greatly contributed to an unhealthy diet that many Samoans have fallen victim to. Not only is corned beef a favourite food source in the Islands, it has also become a ubiquitous part of the ceremonial gift economy.

Such brands of corned beef Tuffery aimed to criticise included Pacific, an Australian brand owned by American conglomerate Kraft-Heinz which specifically markets itself towards Pacific Islanders. It has been maligned for doing so, and also for its use of name "Pacific" as misleading people into thinking the brand is Pasifika-owned. However, the Fijian-made brand Golden Country was the one used in the art, but since the introduction of European cattle to the pacific has degraded Pacific landscapes nonetheless, using a non-European brand did not affect the potency of the message Tuffery was conveying.

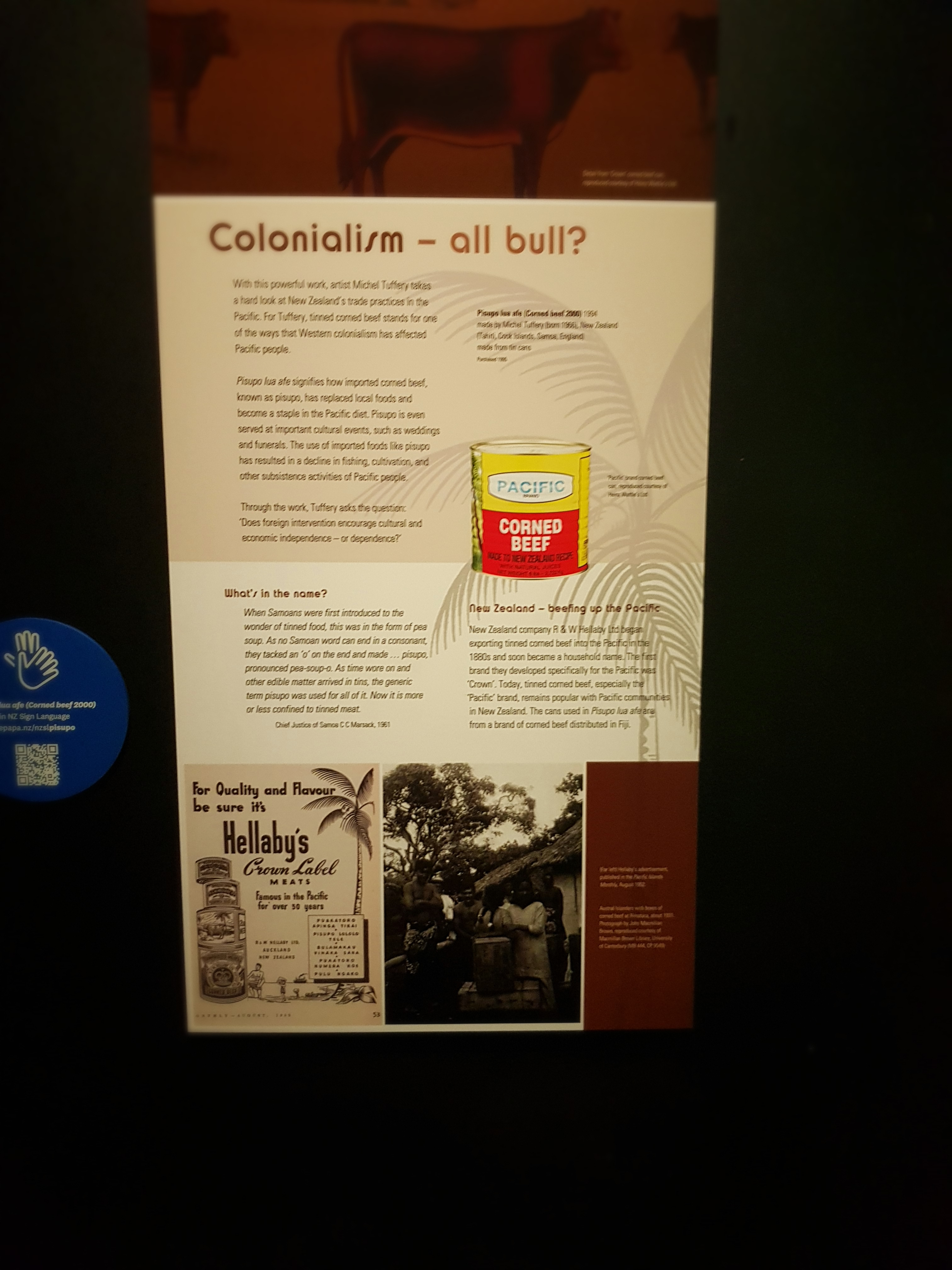
Artwork description, Te Papa Tongarewa.

The symbolism of the bull is used to portray both the animal from which corned beef is derived, and the strength and courage of the Samoan people to overcome colonialism. The latter of which was both a hallmark of New Zealand's colonial rule in Samoa after gaining it from German rule as a League of Nations mandate, and still affects Samoan New Zealanders resident in the country today. Tuffery was also interested in the impact of the introduction of cattle to New Zealand and the Pacific Islands; the hard, abrasive tin is used in the artwork also to symbolise the damage these industries have. The endemic plants, landscapes and waterways of these countries are still being negatively affected by this colonial decision. Additionally, Tuffery was interested in how processed meat products such as corned beef have negatively impacted traditional Samoan food production, and have led to a "throw-away mentality".

== Reception and continuation of series ==
Pisupo Lua Afe (Corned Beef 2000) has been the subject of wide popular and critical acclaim. Critics commended the originality of Tuffery to use pop art in a way that addressed racism and economic dependence, and how the aesthetic simplicity of the work meant it could appeal towards children, as well as adults. The appeal to children persists; an episode of the TVNZ 7 children's series Tales From Te Papa was centred on the artwork, and the artwork is located near the Samoan-themed children's area of Te Papa.

In her writeup for the Christchurch Art Gallery, curator Jennifer Hay described the work as a “wry socio-political message” concerning the place of foreign imported goods in Samoa as part of the larger presence of colonialism in the Pacific Islands. The work has become possibly Tuffery's best known, and is considered an important work of both Pop art and Kiwiana.

=== The Povi Pisupo series ===
Michel Tuffrey with two additional bulls from the Pisupo Lua Afe series

The positive reception to Pisupo Lua Afe encouraged Tuffery to create more animal-based works made out of food tins. With more bulls to work with, Tuffery decided to create a piece of performance art entitled Povi tau vaga (The bull challenge), for the Wellington opening of the exhibition for the continued Povi Pisupo series. Working with artist Patrice Kaikilekofe, his bulls, accompanied by Samoan drumming and dancing, were wheeled along a route through central Wellington to the City Gallery in Te Ngākau Civic Square, where a "bullfight" commenced. This time, they included a wooden frame and wheels, so it could be transported more easily. Fireworks and Christmas tree lights were placed inside these powered bulls, showing a frightening mechanical display of colour. This performance was widely popular, prompting Tuffery to repeat the event for both the Christchurch Art Gallery and the Queensland Art Gallery in Brisbane in 1999, both times with the new bull Povi Christkeke (Christchurch Bull). In Brisbane, the bulls were raced around inside the gallery while fireworks exploded, surprisingly causing no damage; this fiery spark is said to sum up Tuffery as a groundbreaking artist.

"There was fire, there was light..." Tuffrey's Wellington bullfight in process, 1996.
