= Reuben Paterson =

New Zealand artist

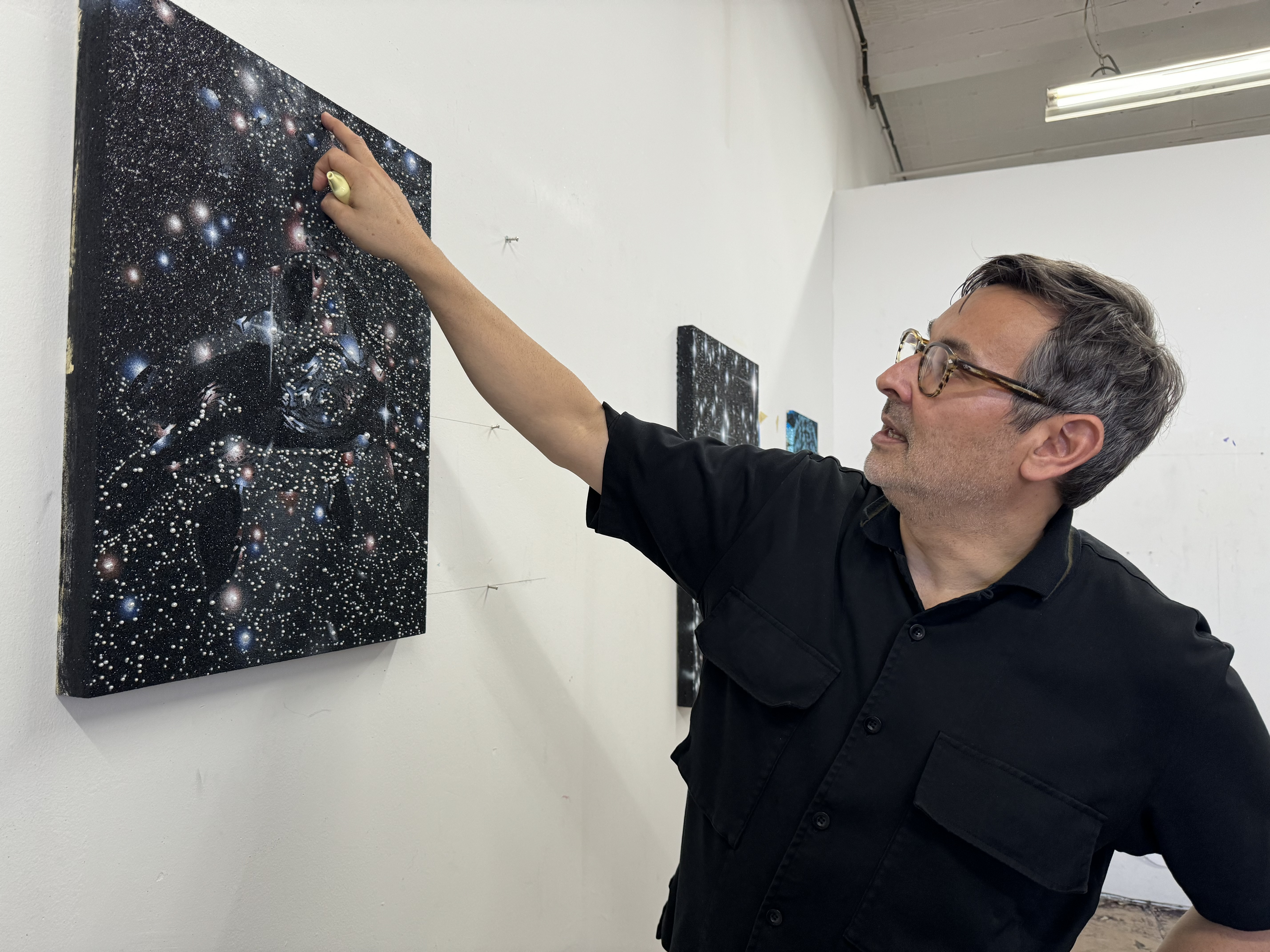
- Reuben Paterson in his New York studio, 2024
- Born: 1973 (age 52–53); Auckland, New Zealand
- Education: Elam School of Fine Arts
- Alma mater: University of Auckland
- Known for: painting and sculptures
- Style: glitter

Reuben Paterson (born 1973 Auckland, New Zealand) (Ngāti Rangitihi, Ngāi Tūhoe, Tūhourangi, Scottish) is a New Zealand artist based in New York, United States known for using glitter in his works.

== Early life ==
Paterson's family comes from Matatā in the Bay of Plenty, but he grew up in Bucklands Beach in Auckland, where his father Louis Paterson was a landscaper and his mother Sue Foss enjoyed gardening. He became interested in glitter as a medium in the 1990s when he was a student at Elam School of Fine Arts at the University of Auckland.

Paterson graduated from the University of Auckland in 1997 with a Bachelor of Fine Arts, and in the same year was one of three people awarded the Möet et Chandon Arts Fellowship to France, becoming the first Māori recipient and at the time the youngest recipient ever. The fellowship provided Paterson with a six-week stay in France and a chance to experience art in Europe. After the fellowship, Paterson spent time travelling and lived in Bath, England for two years. He returned to New Zealand in 2000 and worked as a primary school teacher before becoming a full-time artist.

== Career ==
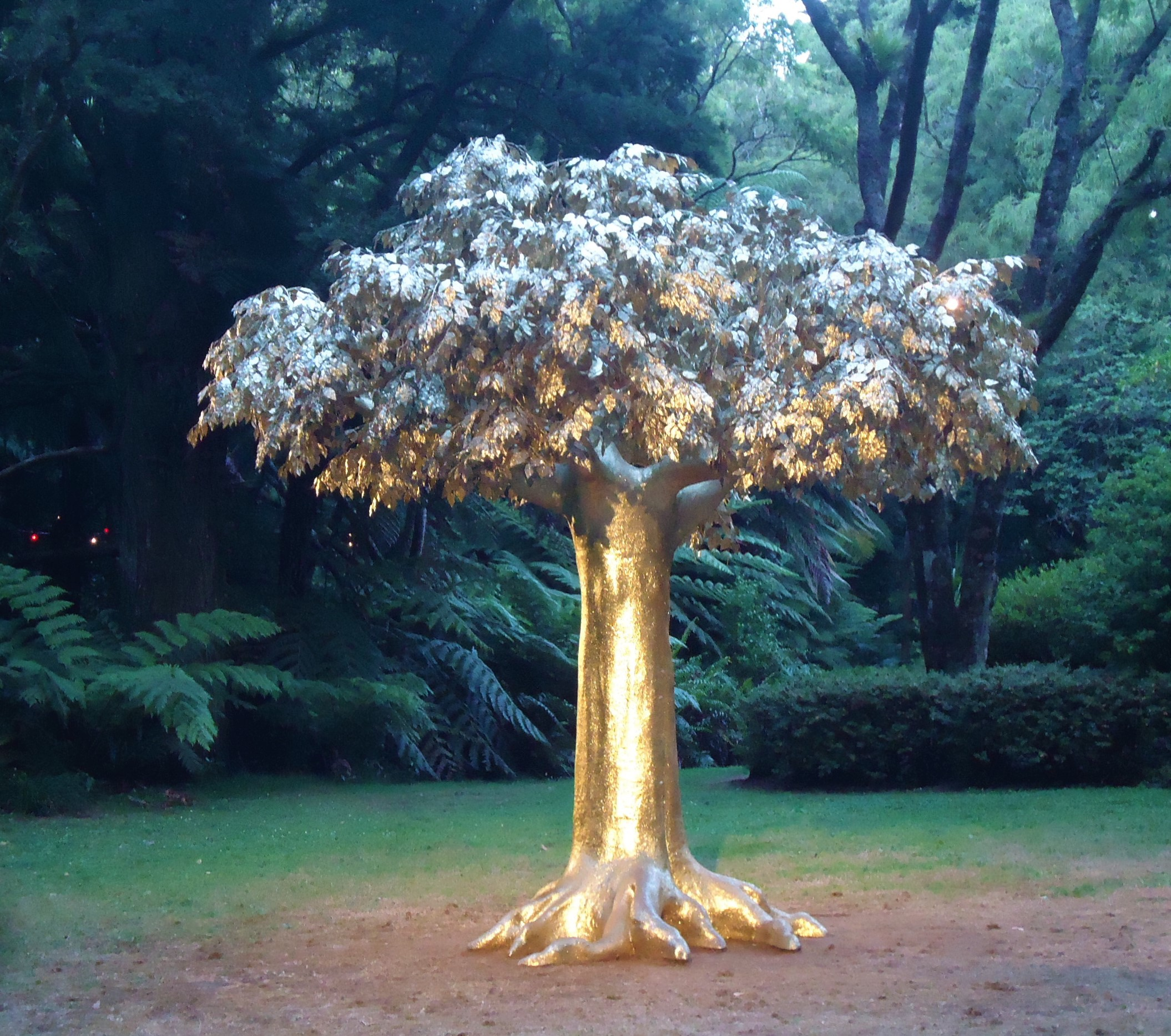
The Golden Bearing, at Pukekura Park in New Plymouth, 2015

Paterson's father died two months after Paterson's return to New Zealand in 2000, and he created The wharenui that Dad built as a commemoration of his father. This work, which uses glitter, was included in an exhibition shown in Noumea as part of the Eighth Pacific Arts Festival.

He won the Wallace Arts Trust Development Award in 2005. In 2009 – 2010 Paterson exhibited at the Asia Pacific Triennial (APT6) in Brisbane and was honoured by having his work feature on the cover of art magazine Art & Australia. In 2010, Paterson was an artist in residence in Rarotonga, Cook Islands by Beachcomber Contemporary Art (BCA Gallery).

Paterson became 'artist in residence' at New Plymouth's Govett-Brewster Art Gallery in 2013, and that year created The Golden Bearing, a life-size golden sculpture of a tree. He was inspired by his father's work as a landscaper. Five versions of the work have been created.

In 2014 ANZ Bank began creating 'GAYTMs': ATM machines covered in artworks supporting the Sydney Mardi Gras, and later the marriage equality bill. In 2015 Paterson, who is himself gay, created a glitter-covered GAYTM in Ponsonby. GAYTMs were shortly vandalised in homophobic attacks as reported by Radio New Zealand, but was quickly cleaned up by ANZ. The bank donated proceeds from people using the GAYTMs to OUTline, a not-for-profit phone counselling service in New Zealand.

In 2017, Paterson collaborated with Cook Islands tivaevae / tivaivai artist Tungane Broadbent in Today, Tomorrow and Yesterday, at Bergman Gallery, Rarotonga, Cook Islands. They collaborated again in 2022 for Nga Meka – Tui Kura in Aotearoa Art Fair, and again in 2023 for Nga Meka – Tui Kura (Epilogue), Bergman Gallery, Rarotonga, Cook Islands.

In 2022 Paterson was a judge at the National Contemporary Art Awards.

Paterson announced his move to New York where he now lives in May 2023 for 'more professional and personal freedom'.

Paterson references his Scottish and Māori heritage by using paisley and koru designs in his works, and has said that he is inspired by “wallpaper, Hawaiian shirts, Dad’s ties and my kuia’s party dresses”. Grid designs are also used extensively. As a child, Paterson spent time at Piha, and he credits the sparkling black sand and sea there as an influence on his extensive use of glitter. As well as glitter, Paterson uses diamond dust and theatre foil in his works. Paterson has stated:

I think of how light is a visual metaphor for spiritual ideas, how religious art used light as a metaphor for the purity of saints and of the gods. The one thing that glitter does is reflect light. So using glitter is a modern interpretation of religious paintings that have informed art's evolution and history, and my response to all of that.

In October 2025 Paterson was awarded the Toi Kō Iriiri Queer Arts Award of the Arts Foundation Te Tumu Toi Laureate Awards.
