= Ani O'Neill =

New Zealand artist

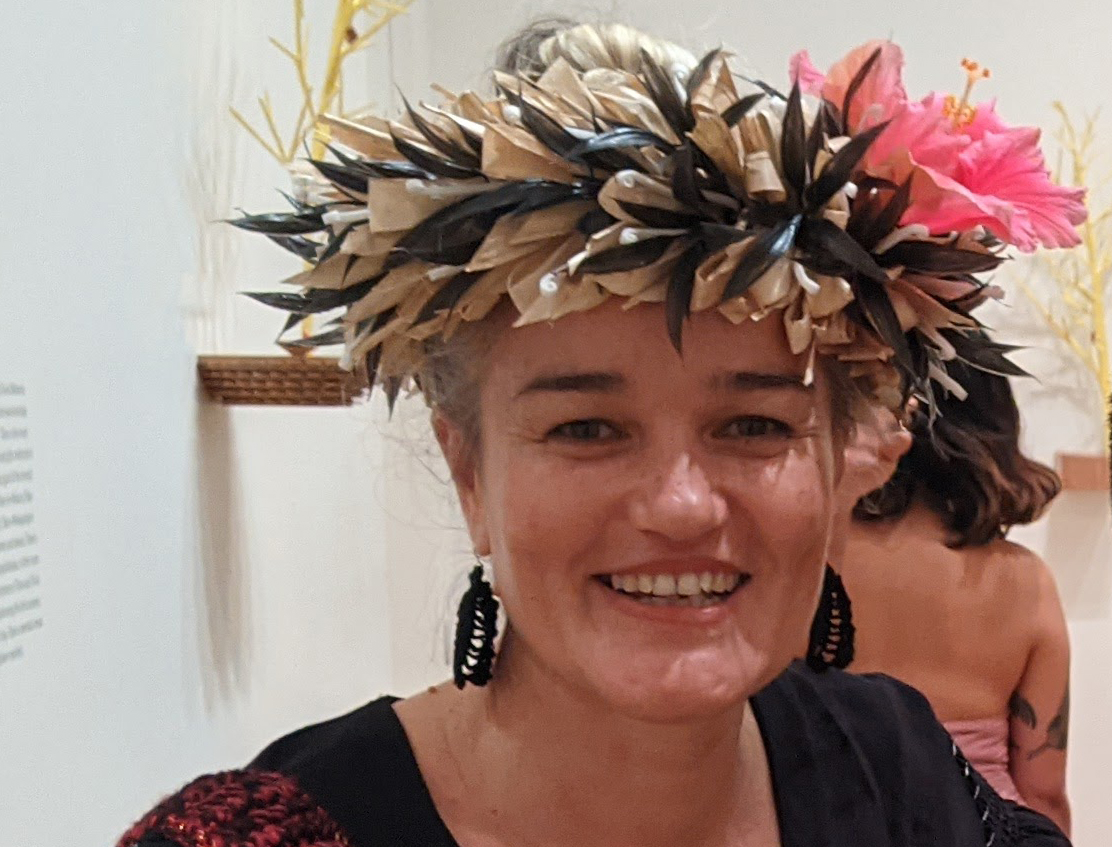
- O'Neill in 2020
- Born: 1971 (age 54–55); Auckland, New Zealand
- Education: Elam School of Fine Arts
- Alma mater: University of Auckland
- Known for: Textiles, Sculpture

Ani O'Neill (born 1971) is a New Zealand artist of Cook Island (Ngāti Makea, Ngāti Te Tika) and Irish descent. She has been described by art historian Karen Stevenson as one of the core members of a group of artists of Pasifika descent who brought contemporary Pacific art to "national prominence and international acceptance".

== Education ==
O'Neill graduated from Auckland University's Elam School of Fine Arts in 1994, with a Bachelor of Fine Arts majoring in Sculpture.

== Work ==
Using a craft-based practice that employs identifiably Pacific materials, O'Neill's work is often collaborative or community-based.

Karen Stevenson writes:

Asserting a Cook Islands identity, yet positioning herself firmly in New Zealand, O’Neill creates a position from which she can question, critique and embrace Cook Islands icons. She noted “my art to me is really looking at my situation as a Rarotongan. I have always felt privileged to have had that background”.

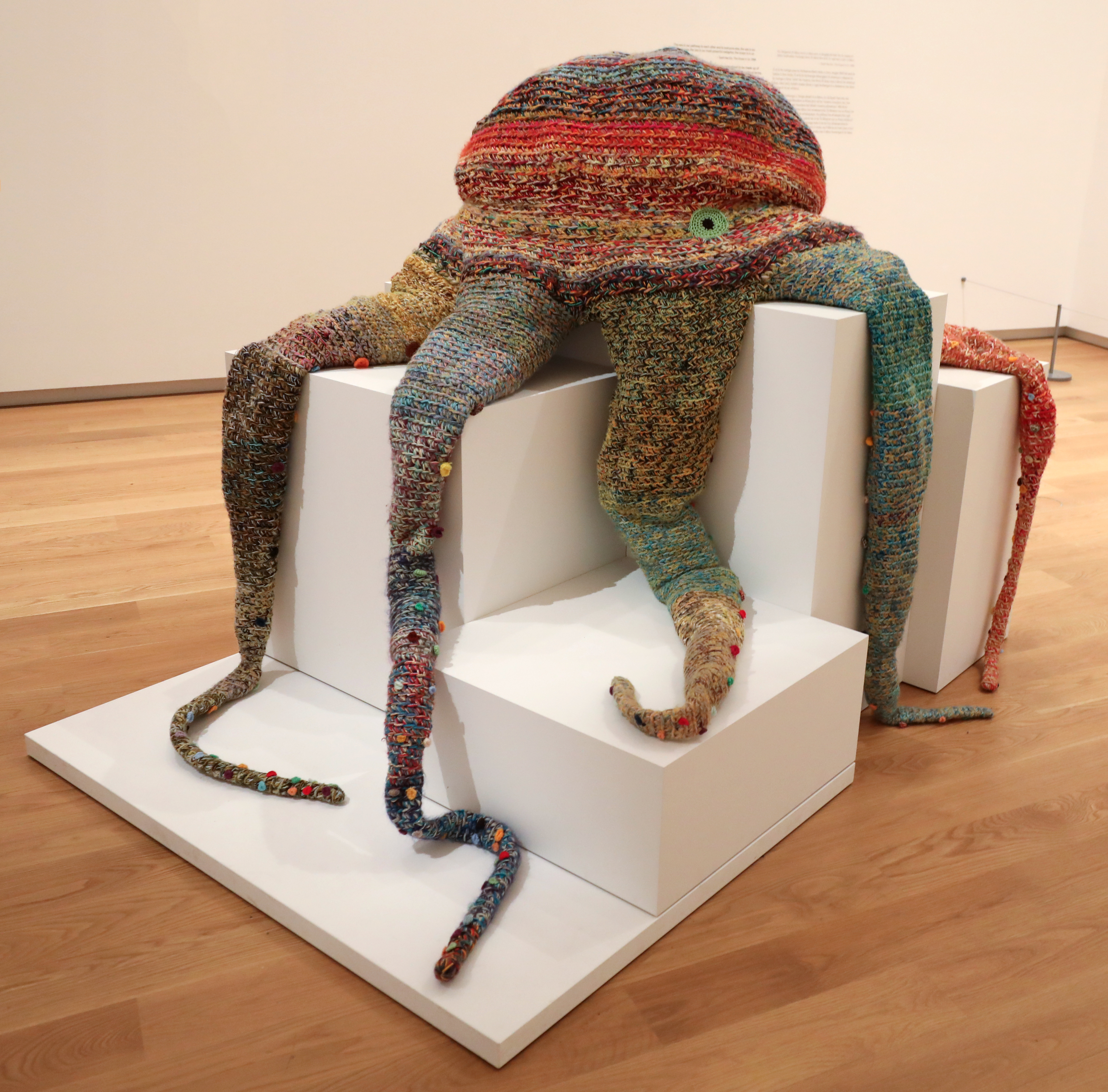
Fresh eke (Eke nui and babies), 2003-2004, Auckland Art Gallery

O'Neill was taught traditional textile crafts such as tīvaevae by her Cook Islands grandmother, and believes that the value of needlework should be recognised. Works such as Rainbow Country (2000), a 'painting' made from dozens of circles of brightly coloured crocheted wool, questions the division drawn between 'craft' and 'fine art' and challenges the attitudes that place low value on traditional women's work.

O'Neill has also used plaiting and braiding techniques in her work to make pieces linked to mats and lei, yet more forms of art traditionally created by women. Her 1993 work Star by Night, for example, is a large-scale (6200 mm x 2935 mm) weaving made from florist ribbon, using a star pattern derived from Cook Islands weaving techniques that refers to Pacific skies and traditions of navigation.

In a 1995 show with artist Yuk King Tan at Teststrip gallery in Auckland, O'Neill showed a work titled Mu'u Mu'u Mama: three long frilly dresses, like the ones Cooks Islands women make for special occasions, suspended in the windows overlooking the street. Art historian Priscilla Pitts writes that the dresses, crafted out of nylon net curtains, 'acted like domestic curtains filtering and transforming our view of the world. The works ... spoke specifically of the ways in which her own culture celebrates and adorns the bod, and highlighted traditions most of us are unaware of.' The Auckland Art Gallery acquired this work in 2011.

The Christchurch Art Gallery Te Puna o Waiwhetū holds a mixed media artwork called 5 Little Piggies (2005) that was made for an exhibition in Rarotonga.

In 2006–2008 O'Neill participated in Pasifika Styles, an exhibition of fifteen New Zealand artists, mostly of Maori and Pacific Island descent, who were invited to make site-specific works throughout the Museum of Archaeology and Anthropology, University of Cambridge that responded to objects in the museum's collection. For her collaborative work The Living Room with Tracey Tawhaio O'Neill 'domesticated' a corner of the museum, creating a lounge setting. Tawhaio painted curvilinear designs over the gallery window and made wallpaper from newspaper overpainted with bright colours to obscure sections and highlight certain phrases; O'Neill customised a sofa that visitors were encouraged to sit on, covering it in floral fabric and a crocheted throw rug. Also included in the installation were photographs by Greg Semu and a monitor displaying a documentary commissioned from academic and broadcaster Lisa Tauoma featuring interviews with many of the artists included in the project. The installation was completed by two Edwardian display cases filled with personal taonga such as hei=tiki, barkcloth, tattooing tools and hand clubs, all selected from the museum's collections but displayed without labels, as if in a domestic arrangement rather than a museum setting. The Living Room became a part of the exhibition that visitors would linger and relax in, a 'comfortable and familial interactive space'.

== Career ==
In 1996 O'Neill represented New Zealand in the Asia-Pacific Triennial in Brisbane, and in 1997 received the Rita Angus Residency where she produced the work Cottage Industry, exhibited at City Gallery Wellington.

In 1998, Ian George curated Paringa Ou, the first major exhibition of contemporary art by Cook Island artists residing in New Zealand featuring artists such as Ani O'Neill, Sylvia Marsters, Mahiriki Tangaroa, Michel Tuffery, Jim Vivieaere, Ian George, and Kay George, the exhibition travelled to the National Museum in Fiji, Cook Islands National Museum, as well as Gus Fisher Gallery in Auckland, New Zealand. The exhibition was sponsored by the New Zealand High Commission.

O'Neill has continued to participate in major national and international exhibitions such as Rainbow Country (2000) at the Museum of New Zealand Te Papa Tongarewa, Pasifika Styles (2006) at the University of Cambridge Museum of Archaeology and Anthropology, and Le Folouga (2009) at the Kaohsiung Museum of Fine Arts in Taiwan.

As a member of Pacific Sisters, O'Neill travelled, exhibited and performed in their influential events which, as Karen Stevenson writes, produced "new voices of self-representation that challenged the comfort and serenity of the stereotype". A major retrospective exhibition of Pacific Sisters was presented at Museum of New Zealand Te Papa Tongarewa in 2018 and then again at the Auckland Art Gallery in 2019.

== Collections ==
O'Neill's work is represented in the collections of the Museum of New Zealand Te Papa Tongarewa and Auckland Art Gallery.

== Major exhibitions ==
- 2012 Home AKL, Auckland Art Gallery
- 2008–9 Le Folouga, Kaohsiung Museum of Fine Arts, Taiwan
- 2006 Pasifika Styles, University of Cambridge Museum of Archaeology and Anthropology
- 2006 High Tide, Zachęta National Gallery of Art in Warsaw and the Contemporary Art Centre in Vilnius
- 2005 LATITUDES 2005, Hôtel de Ville, Paris
- 2004 The Buddy System, Art in General Artist in Residence, New York City
- 2004 9th Festival of Pacific Arts, Belau, The Federated States of Micronesia
- 2003 apexart Artist in Residence, New York City
- 2002 Art and Industry/SCAPE Artist in Residence, Rangi Ruru Girls' School, Christchurch
- 2001 Bright Paradise, The 1st Auckland Triennial, Auckland Art Gallery Toi o Tamaki
- 2000 Lisa Reihana and Pacific Sisters, Biennale of Sydney, Australia
- 2000 Biennale of Nouméa, Jean-Marie Tjibaou Cultural Centre, New Caledonia
- 1998 Paringa Ou, Gus Fisher Gallery, Auckland, New Zealand; Fiji Museum, Fiji; Cook Islands National Museum, Rarotonga, Cook Islands
- 1998 Everyday, Biennale of Sydney, Australia
- 1998 Pasifika, Canberra Contemporary Art Space, Australia
- 1997 Cottage Industry, City Gallery Wellington
- 1995 The Nervous System, Govett-Brewster Art Gallery and City Gallery Wellington
- 1994 Bottled Ocean, City Gallery Wellington, Auckland Art Gallery, Waikato Museum, Te Manawa, Robert McDougall Art Annex
