= Tautai Pacific Arts Trust =

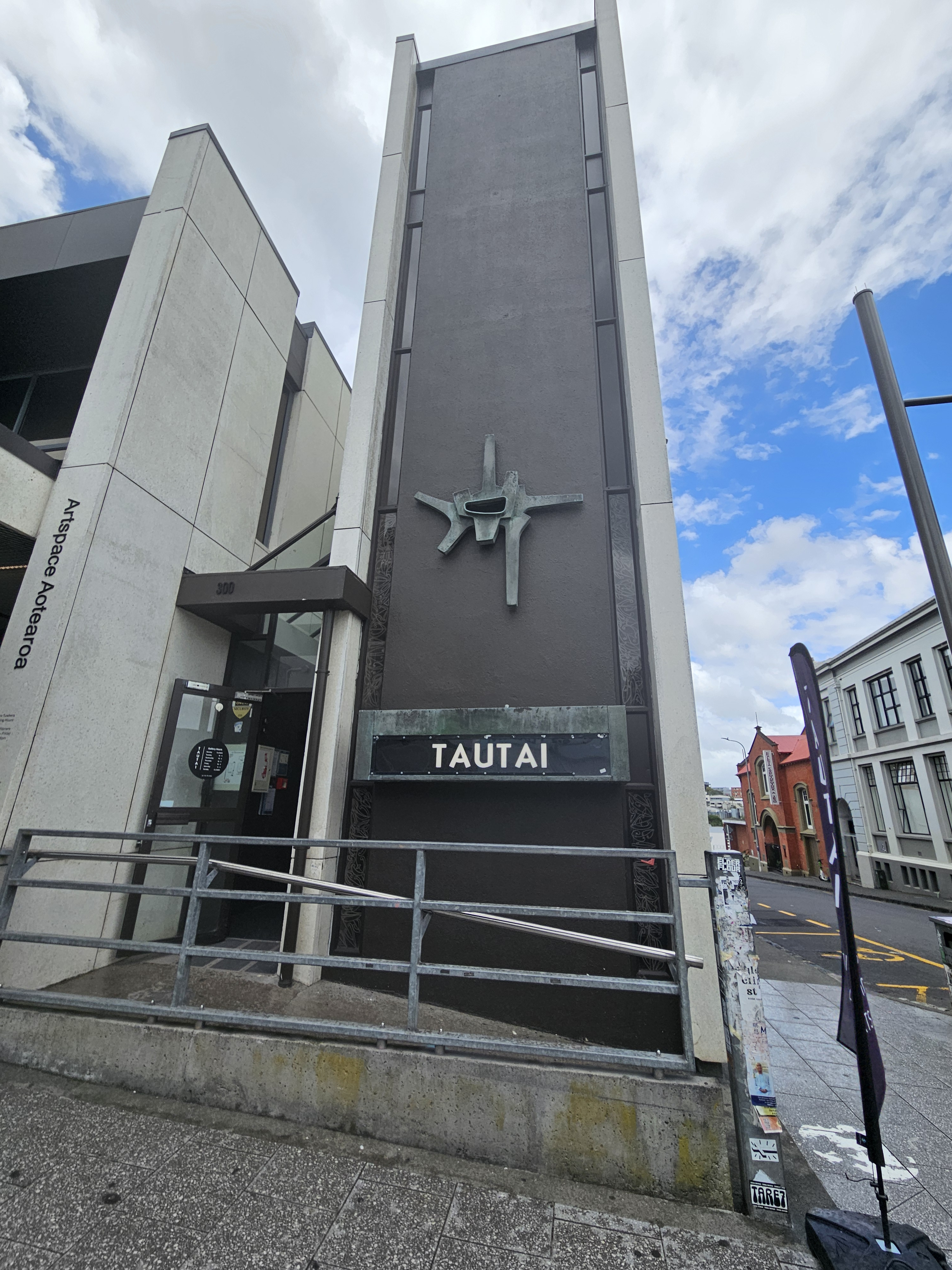
- Tautai Pacific Arts Trust on Karangahape Road, Auckland
- Interactive map of the Tautai Pacific Arts Trust area
- Alternative names: Tautai

General information
- Location: 300 Karangahape Road, Auckland CBD, Auckland,, New Zealand
- Coordinates: 36.85782°S 174.75791°E

Design and construction
- Known for: New Zealand Pacific art

Website
- https://www.tautai.org/

Tautai Pacific Arts Trust, also known as Tautai, is a Pacific gallery in Auckland, New Zealand and a charitable trust founded by Fatu Feu'u to empower Pacific arts in New Zealand. The gallery is described as 'a first-of-its-kind Pacific gallery in central Auckland' by Radio New Zealand. Tautai Pacific Arts Trust is a public space serving Pacific artists and the Pacific community of New Zealand.

== History ==
Fatu Feu'u founded Tautai Pacific Charitable Trust after having a conversation with Colin McCahon in the 1980s, when McCahon told Feu'u that the New Zealand art world was waiting for Pacific artists to make a serious contribution. Tautai was the first Pacific gallery in New Zealand. Fatu Feu'u is still a patron to this day. Fatu Feu'u was appointed an Honorary Officer of the New Zealand Order of Merit in the 2001 New Year Honours for his contribution and development to Pacific arts.

Ian George, an artist, curator and educator, was a former chairperson of the Tautai Pacific Arts Trust.

The name Tautai draws on the Samoan word for navigator. Tautai Contemporary Pacific Arts Trust has provided a sense of community and belonging for the Pacific community in New Zealand for over 30 years. Tautai champions Pacific artists and plays an important role in promoting and nurturing the growing Pacific arts community in New Zealand.

== Present ==
The current location is situated on Karangahape Road, Auckland, as of 2020, the new space was opened by the then Prime Minister of New Zealand, Dame Jacinda Ardern. The building features a sculpture by a New Zealand artist Guy Ngan, who identified as Pacific Chinese. Since 2020, Tautai Pacific Charitable Trust has regularly offered the Tautai Fale-ship Residencies for Pasifika artists, which Creative New Zealand and Foundation North fund.
