= Hye Rim Lee =

South Korean-born New Zealand artist

- Born: 1963 (age 62–63); Seoul, South Korea
- Education: Ewha Womans University, Elam School of Fine Arts
- Known for: 3D animation, Photography

Hye Rim Lee (born 1963 in Seoul) is a South Korean-born New Zealand artist. She is mainly known for her 3D animations and digital photography.

Lee was born in Seoul, South Korea and studied at Ewha Womans University. In 1985 she graduated with a Bachelor of Music degree, majoring in voice. In 1993 Lee moved to New Zealand and completed a Bachelor of Fine Arts majoring in intermedia at Elam School of Fine Arts at the University of Auckland in 2002.

In 2013 Lee held the position of visiting research fellow, faculty of design and creative technology at Auckland University of Technology.
