= Michel Tuffery =

New Zealand artist

- Born: Michael Cliff Tuffery; 27 May 1966 (age 60); Newlands, Wellington, New Zealand
- Education: 1980–85 ‘A’ Bursary, Newlands College, Wellington
- Alma mater: 2014 Master of Fine Arts (Honorary), School of Fine Arts, Otago Polytechnic, Dunedin, | 1990 Mānoa School of Fine Arts, University of Hawaiʻi, United States 1986–89 Bachelor of Fine Arts Printmaking (Hons), School of Fine Arts, Otago Polytechnic
- Movement: Contemporary art, abstract expressionism

Michael "Michel" Cliff Tuffery MNZM (born 27 May 1966) is a New Zealand artist of Samoan, Tahitian and Cook Islands descent. He is one of New Zealand's most well known artists and his work is held in many art collections in New Zealand and around the world.

== Early life ==
His mother is Samoan Bula Tuffery (née Paotonu) and his biological father was Cook Island Tahitian. His step father was Denis Tuffery, of European descent.

He attended Newlands College in Wellington, and has a Diploma in Fine Arts (Hons) from the School of Fine Arts at Otago Polytechnic (1989).

He lives and works in Wellington.

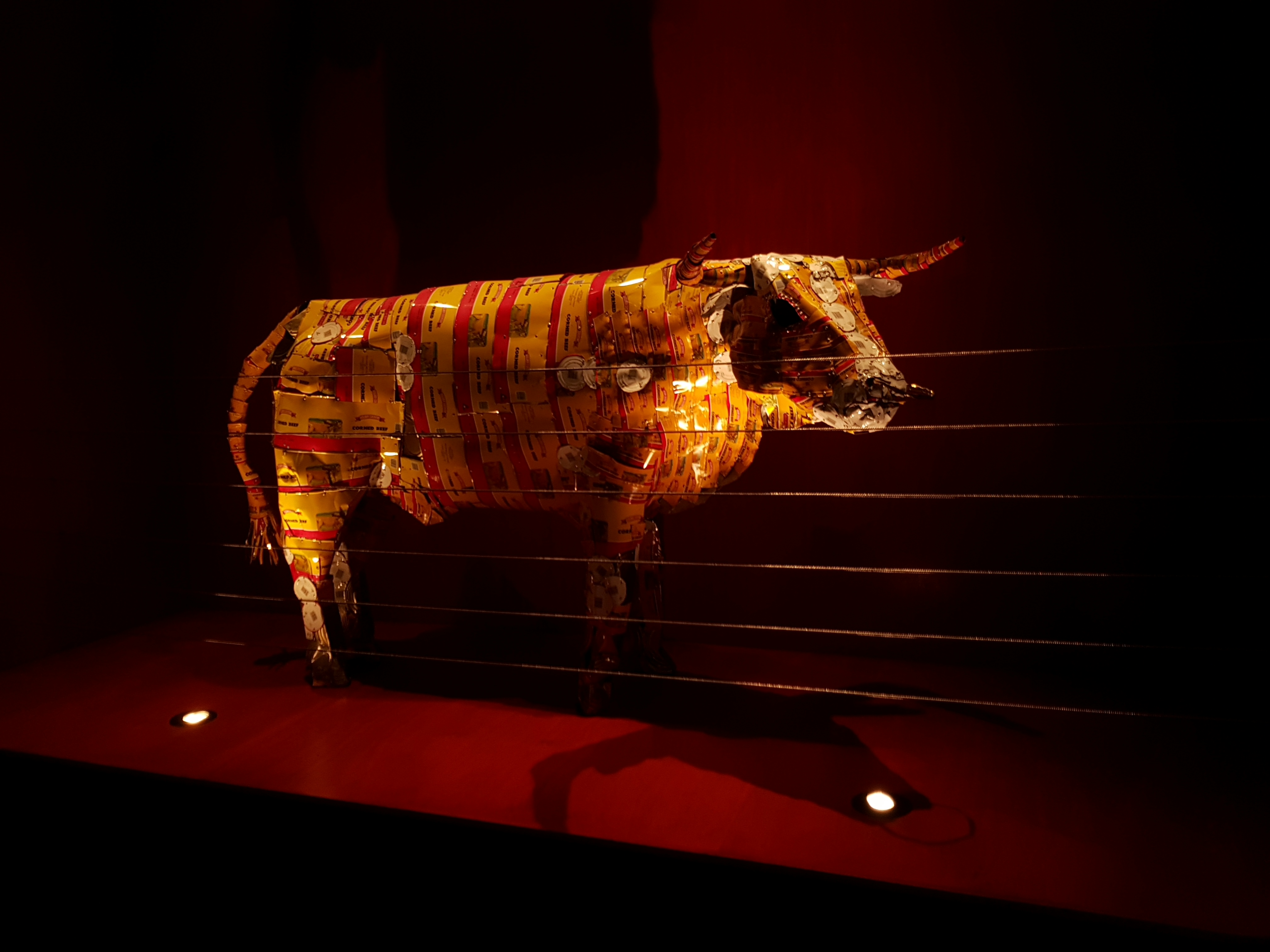
The sculpture Pisupo Lua Afe (Corned Beef 2000), by Michel Tuffery, 1994

== Career ==
One of his distinctive sculptures from 1994 is the life-sized work, entitled Pisupo Lua Afe (Corned Beef 2000), which was constructed from flattened and riveted re-cycled corned beef tins. His work is shaped by his research into, and encounters with his Polynesian heritage while making use of Māori design. Many of his works explore colonialism and people's treatment of the environment. Renowned as a printmaker, painter and sculptor, Tuffery has gained national and international recognition, and has made a major contribution to New Zealand art.

In 1998, Ian George curated Paringa Ou, the first major exhibition of contemporary art by Cook Island artists residing in New Zealand featuring artists such as Ani O'Neill, Sylvia Marsters, Mahiriki Tangaroa, Michel Tuffery, Jim Vivieaere, Ian George, and Kay George, the exhibition travelled to the National Museum in Fiji, Cook Islands National Museum, as well as Gus Fisher Gallery in Auckland, New Zealand. The exhibition was sponsored by the New Zealand High Commission.

In 2010, Tuffery was part of the exhibition MANUIA with Kay George, Mahiriki Tangaroa, Jerome Sheddon, and Michael Tavioni, in American Indian Community House in New York. The exhibition was curated by Ben Bergman and was opened by former New Zealand Prime Minister, and former UNDP Programme Administrator Helen Clark.

In 2012, Tuffery returned to New York as part of VOLTA New York with a solo exhibition with BCA Gallery (now Bergman Gallery).

== Awards ==
He was appointed a Member of the New Zealand Order of Merit, for services to art, in the 2008 Queen's Birthday Honours. In 2010 he was awarded the Contemporary Pacific Art Award at the Creative New Zealand Arts Pasifka Awards, while in 2020 he received the Senior Pacific Artist Award from the same organisation.

== List of works and exhibitions ==
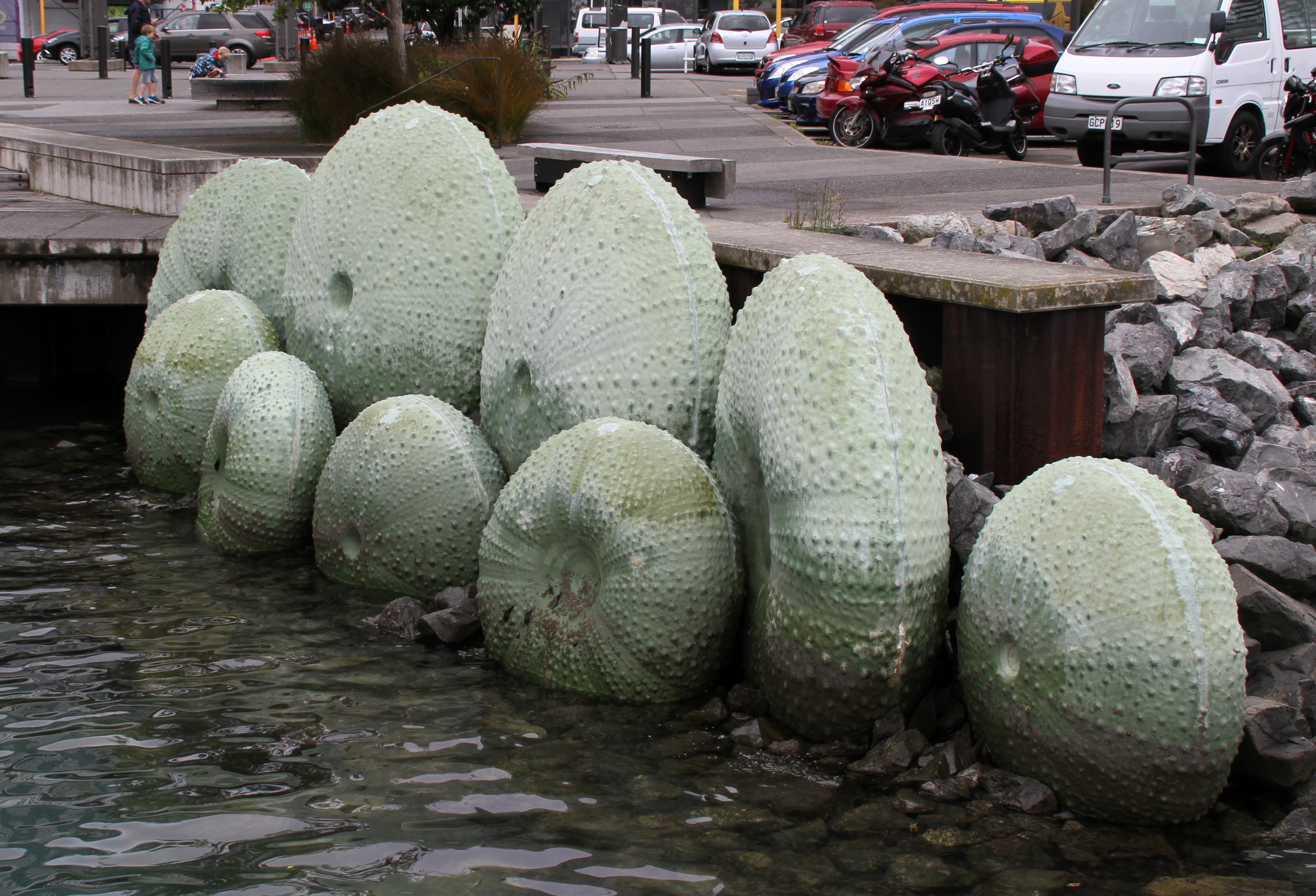
"Nga Kina" by Tuffery on the Wellington waterfront

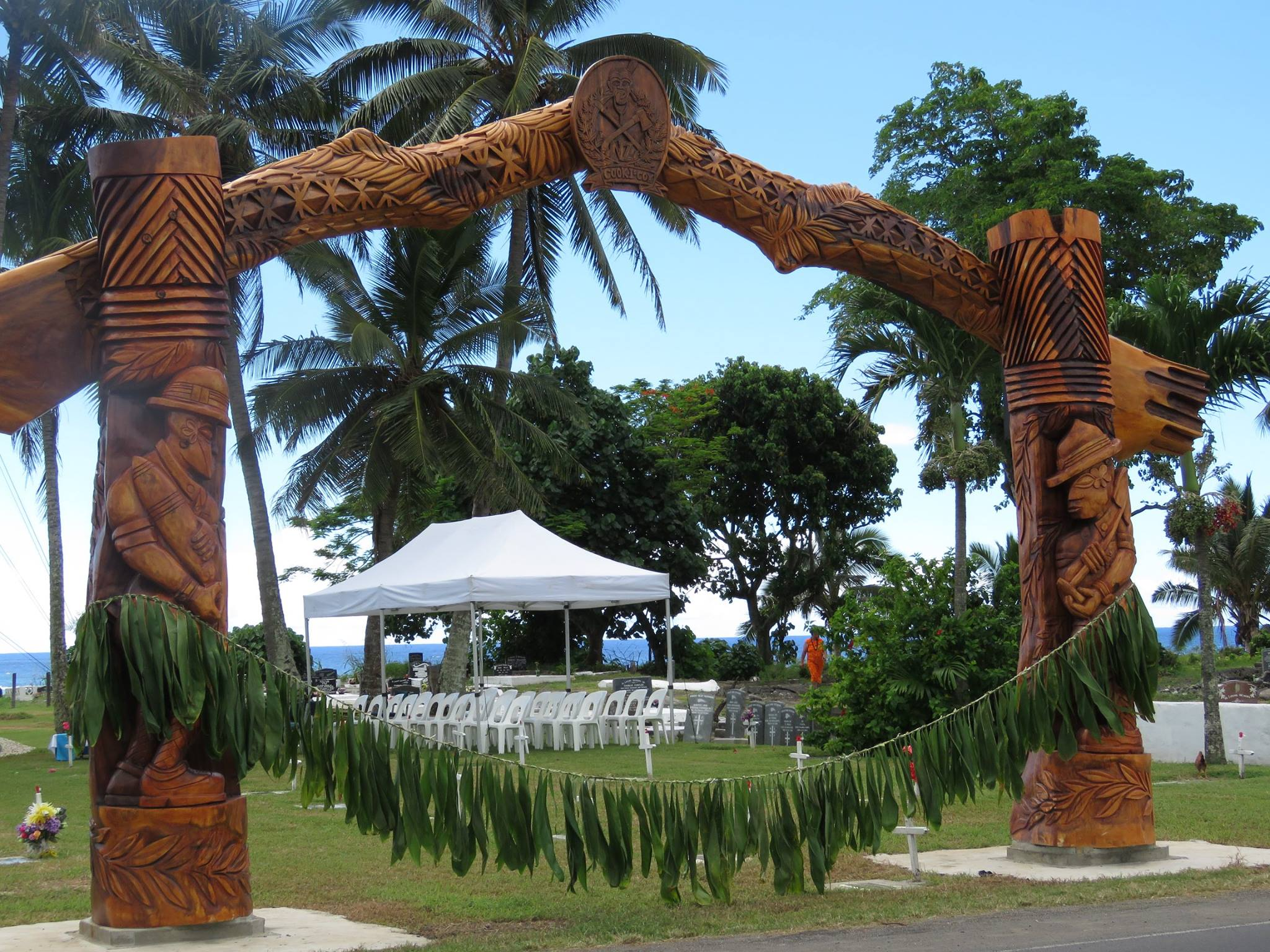
Memorial gateway to the RSA cemetery in Rarotonga, in the Cook Islands. Carved by Mike Tavioni and Michel Tuffery

Tuffery has exhibited extensively in New Zealand and internationally.

- 2022 Te Atuitanga - Between our Cloak of Stars, Bergman Gallery, Auckland
- 2015 World War I Remembered: A Light and Sound Show, multi-media installation with Ngataiharuru Taepa, Pukeahu National War Memorial Park, Wellington
- 2013 Made in Oceania: Tapa – Art and Social Landscapes, Rautenstrauch-Joest Museum, Germany
- 2012 Michel Tuffery at Volta, BCA Gallery (now Bergman Gallery), VOLTA New York, New York, United States of America
- 2012 First Contact, multi-media work for the opening of the 2012 New Zealand International Arts Festival
- 2012 Siamani Samoa, Pataka Museum and Gallery, Porirua
- 2012 50 Years of Friendship: New Zealand & Samoa, commemorative NZ coin design issued by the Reserve Bank of New Zealand.
- 2010: MANUIA, BCA Gallery (now Bergman Gallery), the American Indian Community House, New York, United States of America
- 2003 Voyages, The Lane Gallery, Auckland
- 2003 Animated Effigy, MacKay Art Gallery, North Queensland
- 2002 Mata Mata, Toi o Tamaki, Auckland City Art Gallery
- 2002 Diaspora - Art of the Asia Pacific, Portfolio Gallery, Auckland
- 2002 Pasifika, The Lane Gallery, Auckland
- 2001 Asiasi, Jane Land Gallery, Wellington
- 2001 Out of the Blue, Hawkes Bay Exhibitions Centre, Hastings
- 1999 O le Vasa Loloto ma le Laloa, Christchurch
- 1999 Povi Lua Noumea, and Faga Ofe E'a, in collaboration with artist Patrice Kaikilekofe, New Caledonia
- 1998 Recent Works, Portfolio Gallery, Auckland
- 1998 Paringa Ou, Fiji Museum, Fiji
- 1998 Testing Traditions, Aotea Centre, Auckland
- 1997 Pacific Diaries, Hogarth Gallery, Sydney
- 1997 Common Ground, Page 90 Art Gallery, Taranaki
- 1996 7th Festival of Pacific Arts group exhibition, Samoa
- 1994 Bottled Ocean City Gallery Wellington and touring
- 1994 Woodcuts on Tapa, Claybrook Gallery, Auckland
- 1994 Pisupo Lua Afe, Wellington
- 1994 Povi Tau Vaga - The Challenge, Wellington
- 1990 Anti Drift Net Series, ASA Gallery, Auckland
- 1990 Te Moemoea no Iotefa, Sarjeant Art Gallery, Whanganui
- 1990 Three Polynesian Artists, Robert McDougall Art Gallery, Christchurch
- 1989 Tautai Artists, Gallery 33 1/3 and Louise Beale Gallery, Wellington
