= Jim Vivieaere =

- Born: 1947; Waipara, New Zealand
- Died: 3 June 2011 (aged 63–64); Auckland, New Zealand
- Education: University of Canterbury
- Known for: multimedia, sculptor, curator

James Earnest Vivieaere (1947 – 3 June 2011), a New Zealand artist of Cook Islands Māori heritage, was born in Waipawa, Hawke’s Bay, New Zealand. He was a multimedia and installation artist, freelance curator and an advocate for contemporary Pacific art.

== Early life ==
Vivieaere was raised in the Hawke's Bay by adoptive parents. His contact with his Rarotongan heritage came later in life; in 1982 he was awarded a scholarship to study tapa (bark cloth) in Rarotonga and located his father on that trip.

== Education ==
High academic achievement saw Vivieaere enrol in Dunedin medical school in the late 1960s. He found it difficult to fit into the ‘white upper middle class confines of med school’ and dropped out to enrol at The University of Canterbury School of Fine Arts where he studied graphic design from 1971 to 1974.

== Career ==
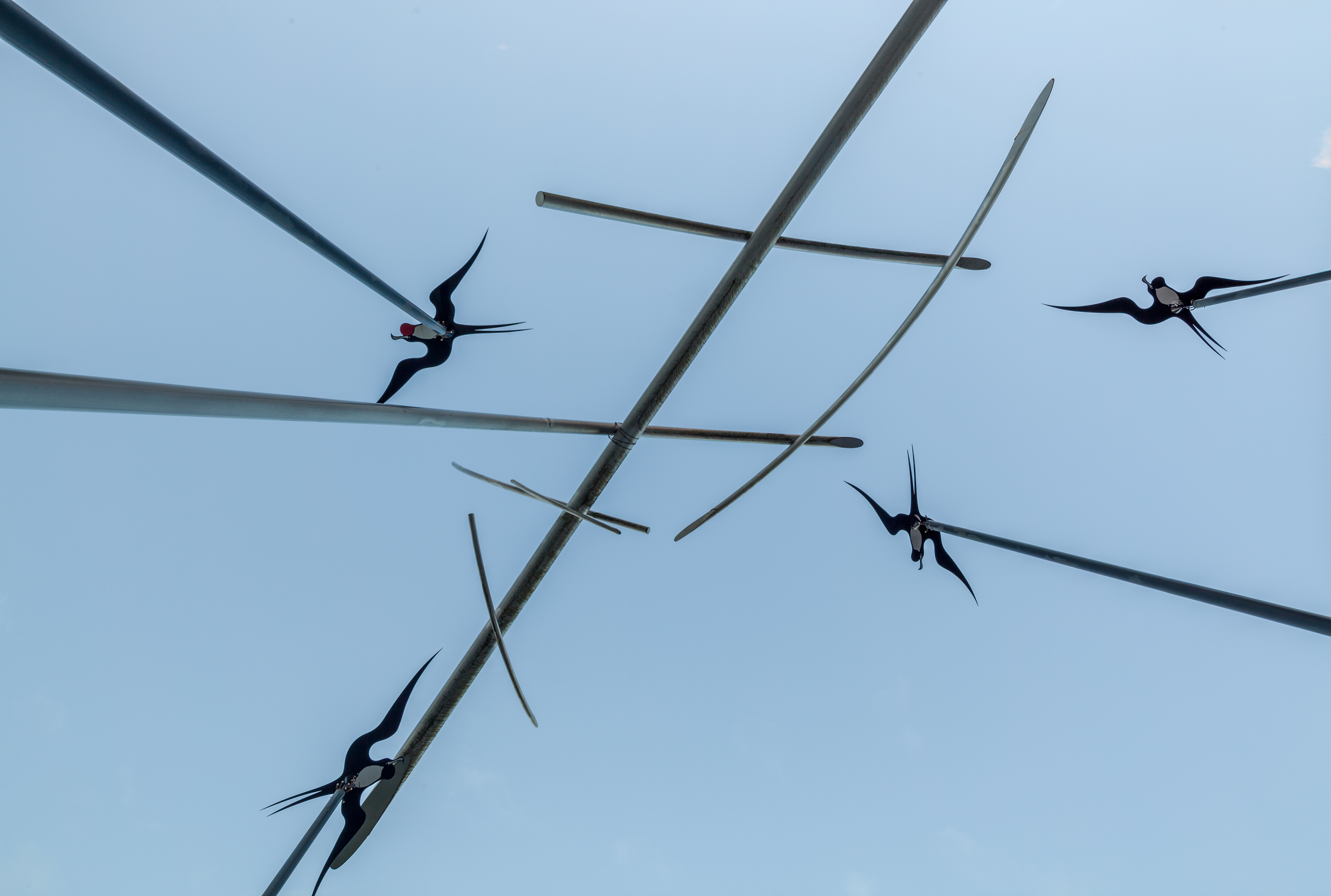
Beacons (2004), a sculpture by Vivieaere located at the University of Auckland

Vivieaere worked to profile contemporary Pacific artists to the world. He curated the formative contemporary Pacific arts survey exhibition Bottled Ocean: Contemporary Polynesian Artistswhich launched at Wellington City Art Gallery in 1994 and toured New Zealand throughout 1994–1995. “Bottled Ocean was the first survey of contemporary New Zealand Polynesian art and 'featured many now iconic Pacific artists including Fatu Feu’u, Johnny Penisula, John Pule, Lily Laita, John Ioane, Niki Hastings-McFall, Albert Refiti, Filipe Tohi, Michel Tuffery, Ani O'Neill, Loretta Young, Patrick Futialo (aka hip hop artist Tha Feelstyle Orator).'

In 2006 he was awarded the Senior Pacific Artist Award at the Creative New Zealand Arts Pasifka Awards.

Exhibitions as a curator:

- 1993Southern Response to Northern Possession, Uberseemuseum, Bremen, Germany.
- 1994-95Bottled Ocean: Contemporary Polynesian Artist, Wellington City Art Galler] and touring
- 1995Asa No Hikari, New Sign, Masano and Minori Kawan, Artspace, Auckland, New Zealand.
- 1996Asia-Pacific Triennial of Contemporary Ar, Queensland Art Gallery, Brisbane.
- 2009 The Great Journey: In Pursuit of the Ancestral Real, Kaohsiung Museum, Taiwan.

In 1998, Ian George curated Paringa Ou, the first major exhibition of contemporary art by Cook Island artists residing in New Zealand featuring artists such as Ani O'Neill, Sylvia Marsters, Mahiriki Tangaroa, Michel Tuffery, Jim Vivieaere, Ian George, and Kay George, the exhibition travelled to the National Museum in Fiji, Cook Islands National Museum, as well as Gus Fisher Gallery in Auckland, New Zealand. The exhibition was sponsored by the New Zealand High Commission.

== Exhibition list ==
- 1979 Documents, Little Maidment Theatre, Auckland
- 1980 Willis Street Art Centre, Wellington
- 1980 Hawkes Bay Art Gallery, Napier
- 1981 5 Hour Exhibition, DB Waitemata Tavern, Auckland
- 1981 3 Hour Exhibition, Club XS, Airdale Street, Auckland
- 1982 Works of Art for Sale, Outreach Gallery, Auckland
- 1982 Women’s Federation Rooms
- 1982 Avarua Rarotanga
- 1983 Jim Vivieaere’s Art, RKS Gallery, Auckland
- 1983 2 ½ Hour Exhibition, Last & First Café, Auckland
