= Ian George (artist) =

Cook Islands artist, educator, and curator

- Born: Ian David George; 1952; Rotorua, New Zealand
- Died: 8 February 2016 (aged 63–64); Rotorua, New Zealand
- Education: Elam School of Fine Arts
- Known for: painting, carving
- Notable work: Entrance of Pacific Room, New Zealand Parliament
- Style: paintings referencing Cook Islands artefacts
- Spouse: Kay George
- Children: Mīria George, Robert George, Ramana George, Kataraina George

Ian David George (1952–2016) was a New Zealand-born Cook Islands senior painter, carver, educator, and curator of Atiu and Rarotonga descent.

George was a founding member of the Cook Island Arts Association and a former chairperson of the Tautai Pacific Arts Trust, In 1988, George relocated to Rarotonga to explore his family's heritage in the Cook Islands and to re-establish the art department at Tereora College, a national college. George later returned to New Zealand in 1995 to oversee the art department at Hillary College.

In 1998, he curated Paringa Ou, the first major exhibition of contemporary art by Cook Island artists residing in New Zealand, featuring artists such as Ani O'Neill, Sylvia Marsters, Mahiriki Tangaroa, Michel Tuffery, Jim Vivieaere, Ian George, and Kay George. The exhibition travelled to the National Museum in Fiji, and Cook Islands National Museum, as well as Fisher Gallery in Auckland, New Zealand. The exhibition was sponsored by the New Zealand High Commission.

In 2002, George graduated with Master of Fine Arts from Elam School of Fine Arts, University of Auckland, and in the same year, George returned permanently to Rarotonga to be a Visual Arts Adviser for the Cook Islands Ministry of Education and a lecturer at the Cook Islands Teachers College.

In 2003, George also co-curated an exhibition named Te Ata Ou as a response to Paringa Ou. Te Ata Ou was exhibited in Christchurch to be part of the Pacific Arts Association Conference in Christchurch, New Zealand.

Inside the New Zealand Parliament, the entrance to The Pacific Room is designed by George, and the wooden carving was carved by four carvers from the South Pacific, Ian George from Cook Islands, Fatu Feu'u from Samoa, Filipe Tohi from Tonga, and Palalagi Manetoa from Niue, about how Pacific peoples from those islands came to New Zealand and made the new country home.

George and his wife Kay George, also a notable artist herself, ran an art gallery named The Art Studio, (now Beluga Cafe), in Arorangi. their daughter Mīria George, is a New Zealand writer, producer and director.

Director Robert George dedicated a full-length feature documentary 'Aka'ōu: Tātatau in the Cook Islands to his father Ian George, about a heavily tattooed Englishman living in Rarotonga named Croc Coulter.

George died peacefully surrounded by his family in Rotorua, New Zealand, where he was also born.

== Collections ==
George's works is held in numerous private and major public and private collections throughout New Zealand, and the Cook Islands including New Zealand Parliament, Christchurch Art Gallery, Auckland Council, University of the South Pacific, Arts House Trust, Pacific Business Trust, and Te Vakaroa Villas.

== Selected exhibitions ==
- 1995: Pacific Graffiti, Uxbridge Community Centre, Auckland New Zealand
- 1998: Paringa Ou, Fisher Gallery, Auckland, New Zealand
- 1998: Paringa Ou, Fiji Museum, Fiji
- 1998: Paringa Ou, Cook Islands National Museum, Rarotonga, Cook Islands
- 2003: Te Ata Ou, Pacific Arts Association Conference in Christchurch, New Zealand
- 2016: Divergence, Bergman Gallery, Rarotonga, Cook Islands
- 2020: Tatou 2, The Story of Us, Bergman Gallery, Rarotonga, Cook Islands
- 2023: Ta Mataora, Bergman Gallery, Rarotonga, Cook Islands
