= Auckland Seventh-day Adventist High School =

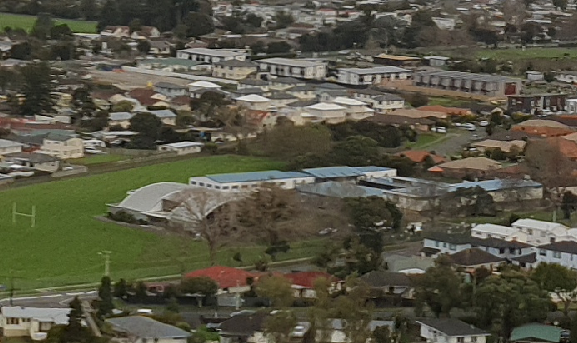
- Auckland Seventh-day Adventist High School seen from Māngere Mountain

Location
- 119 Mountain Road, Mangere Bridge, Auckland; 36.9569°S 174.7848°E

Information
- Type: State-integrated, Day
- Motto: Commitment and Excellence
- Established: 1970
- Ministry of Education Institution no.: 93
- Principal: Gloria Teulilo
- Years: 9–13
- Gender: Co-educational
- Enrolment: 333 (July 2026)
- Socio-economic decile: 2E
- Website: asdah.school.nz

Auckland Seventh-day Adventist High School (ASDAH) is a secondary school (years 9–13) in Māngere Bridge, a suburb of South Auckland, New Zealand. It is owned by the Seventh-day Adventist Church.

It is a part of the Seventh-day Adventist education system, the world's second largest Christian school system.

== History ==
The school was opened in March 1970, at the time one of the almost 5,000 Seventh-day Adventist schools around the world.

In the 2007 Education Review Office (ERO) report, it was recommended that the Secretary for Education intervene in order to bring about improvements to school management and governance, with particular reference to improving the management of the curriculum, personnel, and the provision of a safe environment. A Limited Statutory Manager was appointed in August 2008 to work with the board to address these issues.

According to the 2016 ERO External Evaluation, the school responds well to Maori and other students whose learning and achievement need acceleration. Due to the 2019 school roll, which is 246 students, relational trust between teachers and learners is positively impacting on student progress and achievement. The report continues stating that the small numbers in senior classes encourage teachers to develop relationships with the students that are clearly focused on supporting academic achievement.

The largest ethnic group is Tongan (28%) followed by Cook Island Maori (22%).

== Academics ==
Achievement data for National Certificate of Educational Achievement from 2003 to 2007 indicate that at Levels 1, 2 and 3 was above the averages for schools of a similar socio-economic decile. Achievement in literacy and numeracy has improved, but school results are still below national averages

Based on the 2016 ERO report, 2016 results in National Certificate of Educational Achievement (NCEA) show that students achieve significantly higher at Level 1 and 2 than students in similar schools. In 2015 and 2016, students achieved above the national average in NCEA Level 2.

== See also ==
- Seventh-day Adventist education
- List of Seventh-day Adventist secondary schools
