= Mahiriki Tangaroa =

New Zealand-born Cook Islands photographer and painter

- Born: 1973 (age 52–53); Auckland, New Zealand
- Education: Ilam School of Fine Arts
- Alma mater: University of Canterbury
- Known for: painting
- Notable work: Kaveinga: Angels of the Ocean (2022)
- Style: Cubism

Mahiriki Tangaroa (born 1973, Auckland, New Zealand) is a New Zealand-born Cook Islands photographer and painter. She is a former director of the Cook Islands National Museum. She is recognised as a leading contemporary Cook Islands artist, and her work is regularly exhibited in galleries in New Zealand and the Cook Islands. She also exhibits internationally in Paris, Venice, and New York.

== Early life ==
Of Cook Islands heritage, Tangaroa was born in Auckland, New Zealand, and grew up in Christchurch. Tangaroa emigrated to the Cook Islands when she was 24 years old. Tangaroa majored in photography at Ilam School of Fine Arts in the University of Canterbury, before returning to the Cook Islands in 1998.

== Art career ==
In 1998, Ian George curated Paringa Ou, the first major exhibition of contemporary art by Cook Island artists residing in New Zealand featuring artists such as Ani O'Neill, Sylvia Marsters, Mahiriki Tangaroa, Michel Tuffery, Jim Vivieaere, Ian George, and Kay George, the exhibition travelled to the National Museum in Fiji, Cook Islands National Museum, as well as Gus Fisher Gallery in Auckland, New Zealand. The exhibition was sponsored by the New Zealand High Commission.

Tangaroa began to paint in 1999. Her work is inspired by ancient Cook Islands art and artefacts, including the "fisherman's god" Tangaroa, the war god Rongo and the goddess of Aitutaki. Tangaroa's paintings ignites the discussions about the loss of pre-colonial and pre-Christianity culture in the Cook Islands, how indigenous gods that Cook Islanders once worshipped is turned into mass produced commercial exploitation. Her exhibitions draws large crowds in the Cook Islands.

In 2000 Tangaroa was appointed director of the Cook Islands National Museum, a position she held for three years. She subsequently worked as the director of the Beachcomber Gallery in Avarua.

In 2010, Tangaroa was invited to curate the exhibition Atua: sacred art from Polynesia, which was displayed at the National Gallery of Australia and the St. Louis Art Museum in the USA.

In 2010, Tangaroa was part of the exhibition MANUIA with Kay George, Michel Tuffery, Jerome Sheddon, and Michael Tavioni, in American Indian Community House in New York. The exhibition was co-curated by Tangaroa and Ben Bergman, and was opened by former New Zealand Prime Minister, and former UNDP Programme Administrator Helen Clark.

John Gow of Gow Langsford Gallery, and Alison Bartley in 2022 co-curated OCEANIA NOW: Contemporary Art from the Pacific, at Christie's in Paris featuring artists Shane Cotton, Brett Graham, Lyonel Grant, Nikau Hindin, Yuki Kihara, Roger Mortimer, Fiona Pardington, John Pule, Lisa Reihana, Mahiriki Tangaroa, Kelcy Taratoa, John Walsh, Dame Robin White, and Cora-Allan Wickcliffe.

In 2022, Tangaroa had a solo exhibition titled Kaveinga – Angels of the Ocean, presented by Bergman Gallery in Venice, Italy as part of European Cultural Centre: Personal Structures coinciding Venice Biennale.

Fatu Feu'u collaborated with Tangaroa in 2024 in an exhibition named Aro'a Alofa in Rarotonga, Cook Islands. Feu'u explained the exhibition is a way of giving back to the Cook Islands and the friends who supported his career, as well as reconnecting with the local community.

In February 2025, a book on Marjorie Crocombe was published, Joan Gragg and Tricia Thompson both noted Marjorie’s significant contributions to Cook Islands Māori language's preservation and education. The book was decorated with paintings by Joan Gragg and Mahiriki Tangaroa.

In July 2025, there was an exhibition titled To Tātou Mārāmā, Our Light, celebrating the Cook Islands’ 60 years of self-governance, featuring four senior Cook Islands women Mahiriki Tangaroa, Sylvia Marsters, Kay George and Joan Gragg. The exhibition was opened by Catherine Graham, New Zealand High Commission to the Cook Islands. Tangaroa's work was commentary of the social change and inherited dislocation in the Cook Islands.

== Collections ==
Her work is held in numerous private and major public collections throughout New Zealand and Cook Islands, including University of the South Pacific, Christchurch Art Gallery, The Arts House Trust, and Dame Patsy Reddy Collection

== Selected solo and collaborative exhibitions ==
- 2024: Aro'a Alofa (with Fatu Feu'u), Bergman Gallery, Rarotonga Cook Islands
- 2022: Kaveinga - Angels of the Ocean, European Cultural Centre - Italy: Personal Structures: Reflections, Venice, Italy
- 2020: In a Perfect World, Bergman Gallery, Rarotonga, Cook Islands
- 2019: Earth, Wind & Fire... Irrespective of Place, Bergman Gallery, Rarotonga, Cook Islands
- 2019: Kia Maeva Tatou, Bergman Gallery, Rarotonga, Cook Islands
- 2016: Blessed again by the Gods, Bergman Gallery, Rarotonga, Cook Islands
- 2009: M101, BCA Gallery, Rarotonga, Cook Islands
- 2008: Mangoes in the Morning, Gallery De Novo, Dunedin, New Zealand
- 2008: Exit of Itoro, Reef Gallery, Auckland, New Zealand
- 2003: Avatea, Letham Gallery, Auckland, New Zealand

== Selected group exhibitions ==
- 2025: To Tātou Mārāmā, Our Light, Bergman Gallery, Rarotonga, Cook Islands
- 2025: Aotearoa Art Fair, Viaduct Events Centre, Auckland New Zealand
- 2024: Aotearoa Art Fair, Viaduct Events Centre, Auckland New Zealand
- 2022: OCEANIA NOW: Contemporary Art from the Pacific, Christie's, Paris, France
- 2022: Te Atuitanga - Between our Cloak of Stars, Bergman Gallery, Auckland, New Zealand
- 2010: MANUIA, American Indian Community House, New York, United States of America
- 1998: Paringa Ou, Gus Fisher Gallery, Auckland, New Zealand
- 1998: Paringa Ou, Fiji Museum, Fiji
- 1998: Paringa Ou, Rarotonga, Cook Islands National Museum
