= Mike Tavioni =

Cook Islands artist and writer

BEM Mike Tavioni
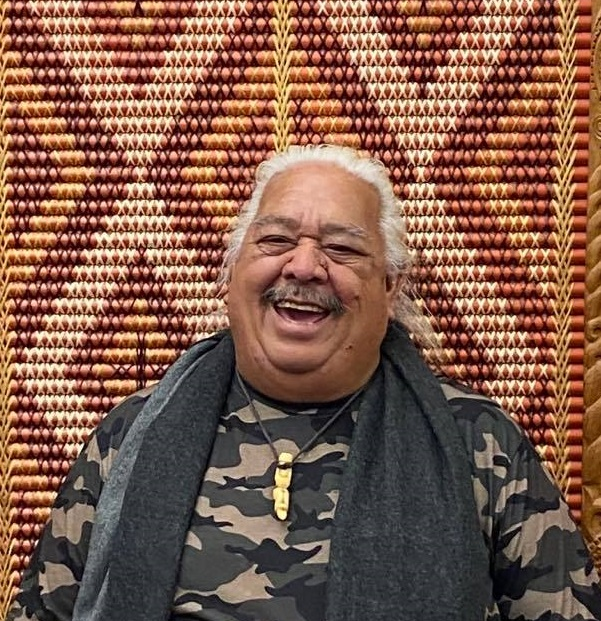
- Mike Tavioni in 2022
- Born: 1947 (age 78–79); Rarotonga, Cook Islands
- Education: Tereora College; Northland College; Massey University; Auckland University of Technology
- Occupations: Artist; writer

Mitaera Ngatae Teatuakaro Michael Tavioni BEM (born 1947) is a Cook Islands artist and writer. A master carver, he has been described as a taonga (treasure). His role in the pacific art community is recognised from New Zealand to Hawaii.

Tavioni was born on Rarotonga. He was educated at Tereora College, then at Northland College, Kaikohe and Massey University in New Zealand, graduating with a degree in Agriculture & Horticulture. After working as a public servant in the Agriculture Department, he became a full-time artist. In 2019 he graduated with a Master of Fine Arts from Auckland University of Technology.

He has worked in a wide variety of mediums, including printing, painting, wood, stone, and bone, as well as traditional tattooing. In 1975 he began printing t-shirts using wooden blocks. He experimented with other mediums, but initially found it difficult to obtain tools and materials. In 1996 he oversaw the creation of the Punanga Nui market. In 2002 he published a poetry collection, Speak Your Truth. His work is displayed at the Punanga Nui in Avarua and the University of the South Pacific campus. In 2016 he was commissioned, alongside New Zealand-based artist Michel Tuffery, to create a carved wooden gateway for the RSA memorial cemetery to commemorate the centenary of Cook Islands participation in the First World War.

Tavioni unsuccessfully stood as a candidate for the Unity party in the 1978 Cook Islands general election. He later stood as a candidate for the Te Kura O Te ʻAu People's Movement in Avatiu–Ruatonga–Palmerston in the 2010 election.

In 2010, Tavioni was part of the exhibition MANUIA with Kay George, Mahiriki Tangaroa, Jerome Sheddon, and Michel Tuffery, in American Indian Community House in New York. The exhibition was curated by Ben Bergman and was opened by former New Zealand Prime Minister, and former UNDP Programme Administrator Helen Clark.

Tavioni now runs a gallery and art school in Rarotonga, where he teaches traditional vaka-making. In 2021 he was the subject of a short documentary film, Taonga: An Artists Activist.

In the 2022 Birthday Honours he was awarded the British Empire Medal for services to the arts and to the community.

== Images ==
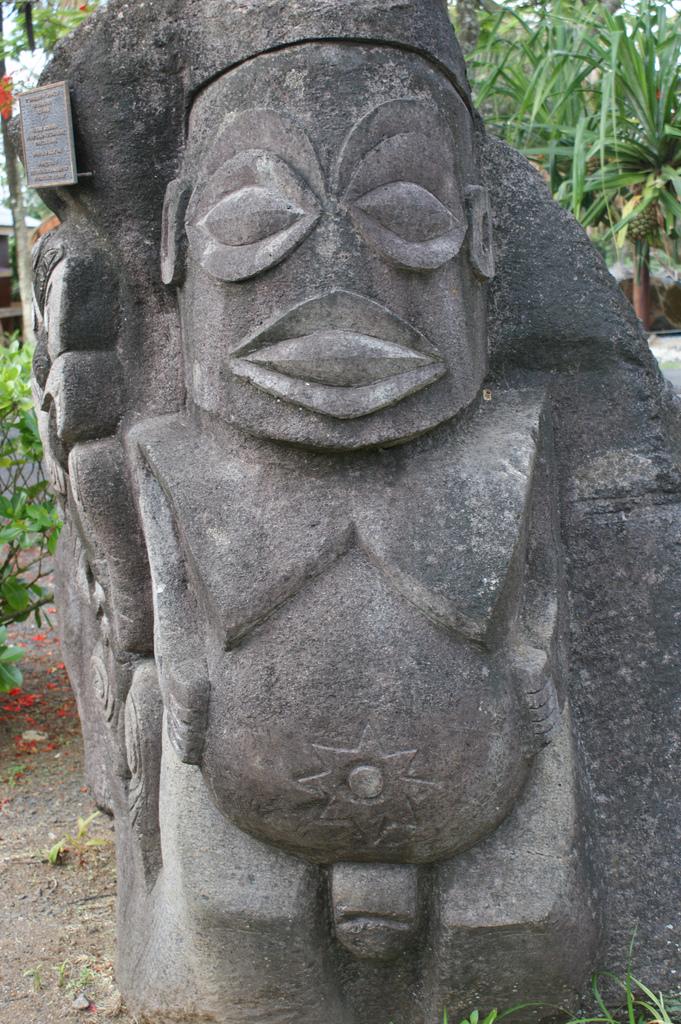
Punanga Nui sculpture, 1998

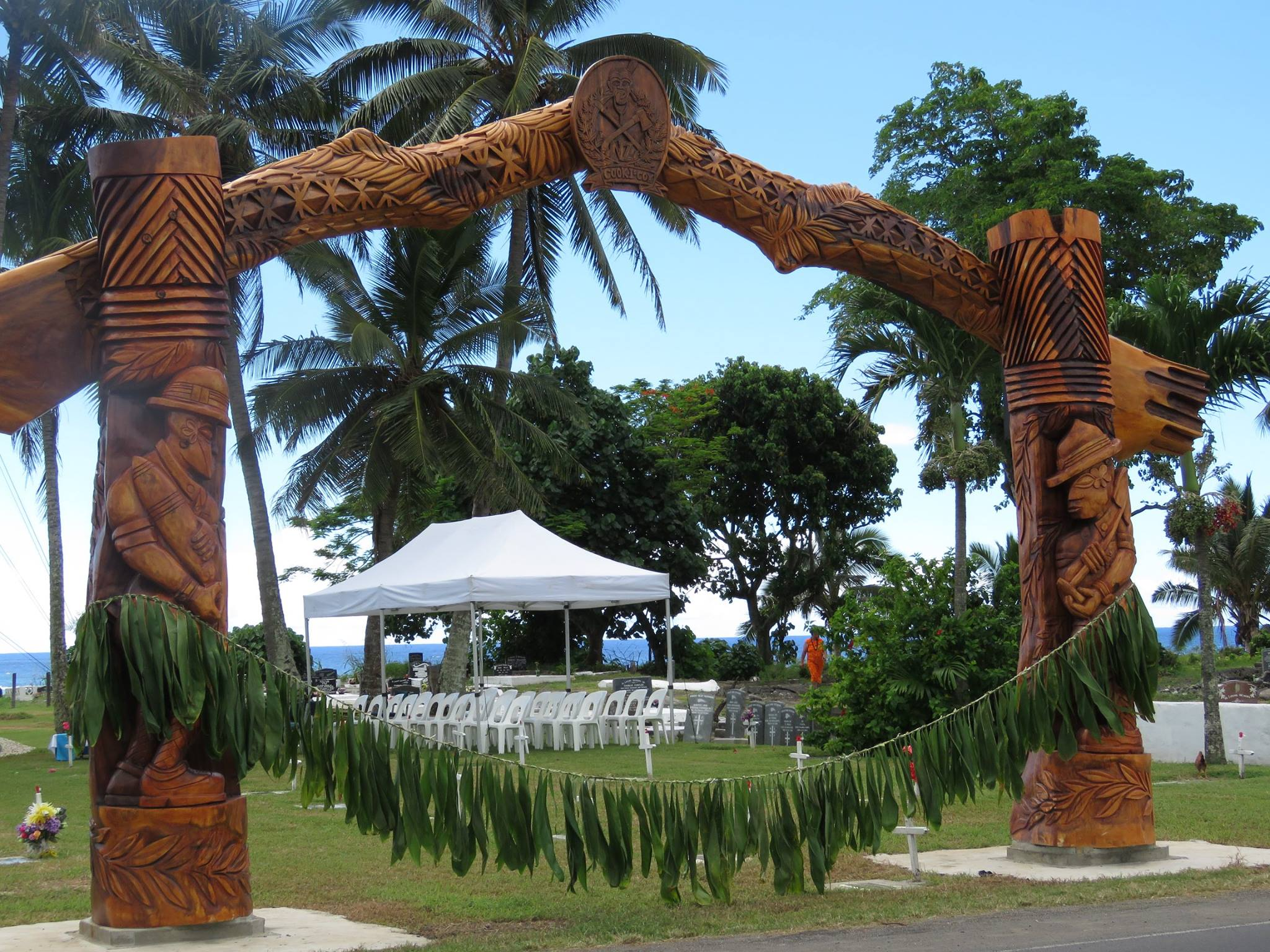
Cook Islands RSA Memorial Gateway, 2017

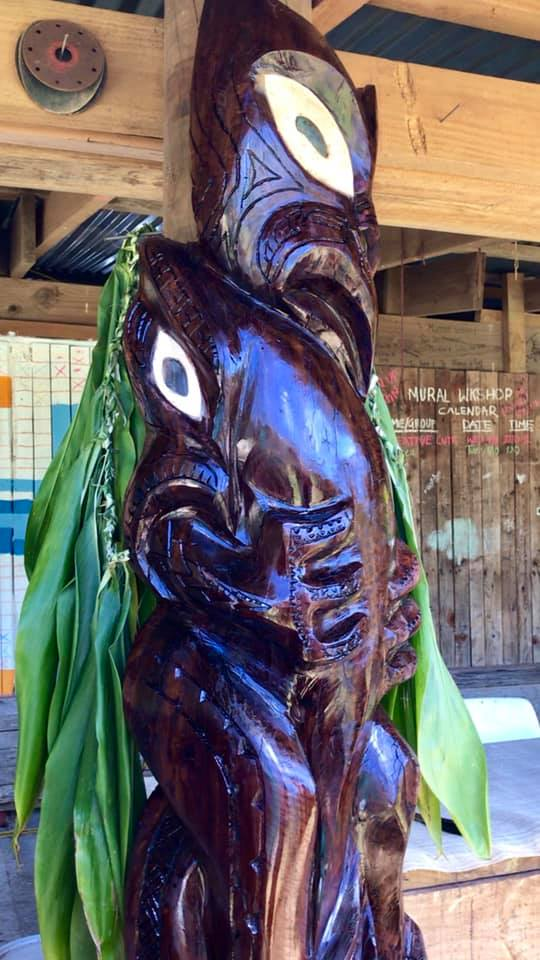
Wood carving for NZ High Commission, 2019
