= Bergman Gallery =

New Zealand and Cook Islands art gallery

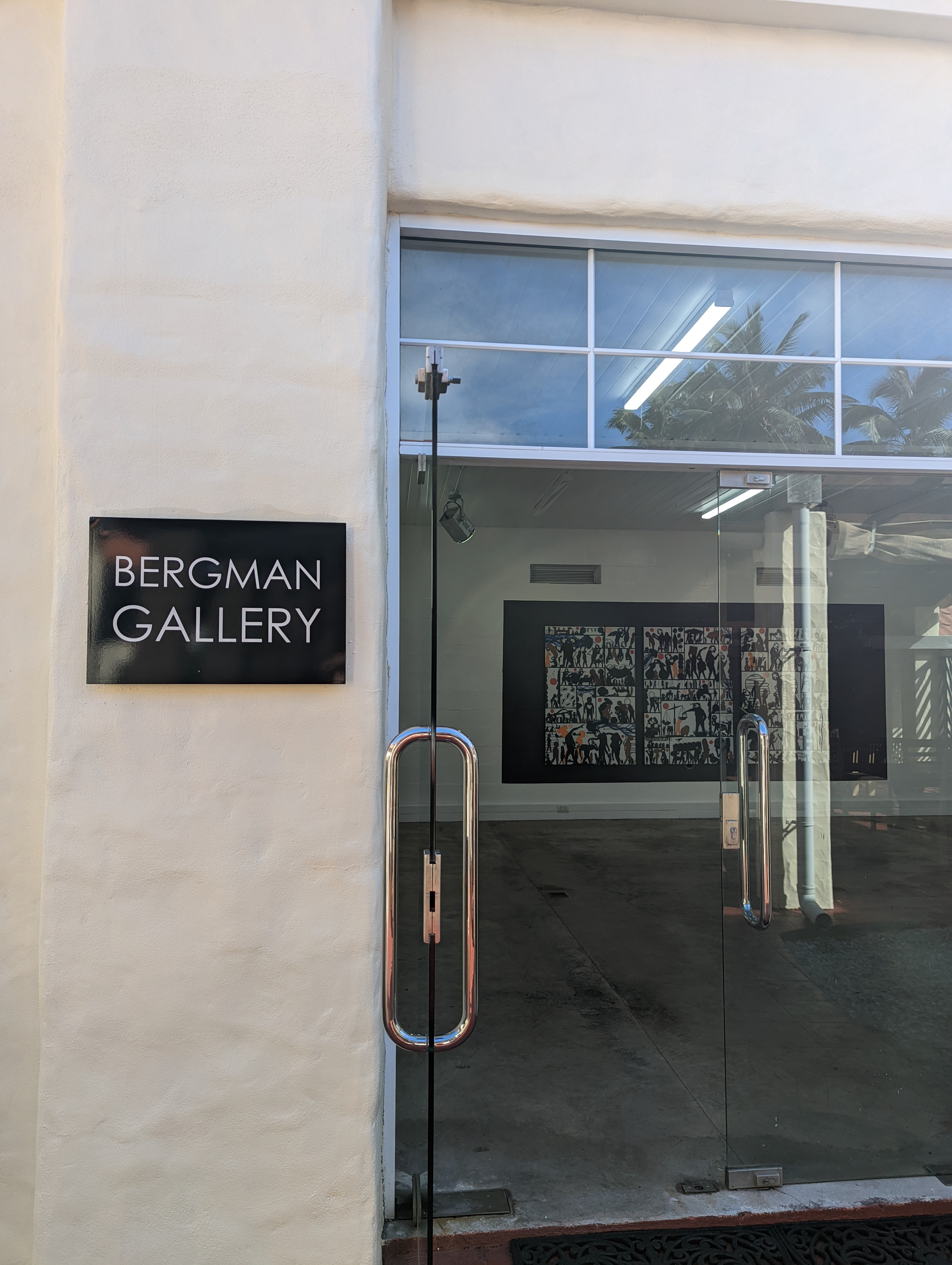
- Interactive map of the Bergman Gallery area
- Former names: BCA Gallery (Beachcomber Contemporary Art)

General information
- Type: Commercial dealer gallery
- Location: Beachcomber Courtyard, Taputapuatea Rd, Avarua, Rarotonga, Cook Islands
- Coordinates: 21.20486°S 159.77275°W

Website
- http://www.bergmangallery.com

Bergman Gallery is an commercial art gallery in Rarotonga, Cook Islands. Bergman Gallery represents and has represented many significant international artists from New Zealand, Cook Islands and Australia, including Fatu Feu'u, Luise Fong, Andy Leleisi'uao, Reuben Paterson, Michel Tuffery, Billy Apple, Ian George, Mahiriki Tangaroa, Sylvia Marsters, and Lucas Grogan.

== History ==
Founded by artist and educator Joan Gragg in 2001, Bergman Gallery was previously known as BCA Gallery (Beachcomber Contemporary Art), in Rarotonga, Cook Islands between 2001-2015, and during 2016 it was transformed into Bergman Gallery under director Ben Bergman. After participated in the past five Auckland Art Fairs, Bergman Gallery director felt there was a niche in the market for Contemporary Pacific art and decided to open a second gallery in Auckland, New Zealand in 2022. Bergman Gallery in Auckland, New Zealand was situated on Karangahape Road, and was officially opened by Caren Rangi ONZM, Chair of Arts Council of New Zealand at the time. There was also a delegation from the Cook Islands attended the official opening with the Minister of Cultural Development, George Maggie Angene, Cultural Development Secretary, Anthony Turua and Cook Islands Consular Officer, Keu Mataroa. In 2026, Bergman Gallery in Auckland closed down.

== Present ==
Bergman Gallery represents both emerging and established artists, and has since expanded to show Asian art and LGBTI+ artists from Germany, Australia, Cook Islands, and New Zealand.

The gallery regularly participates in Auckland Art Fair (now Aotearoa Art Fair), as well as VOLTA New York, Tokyo International Art Fair, and European Cultural Centre Italy, Personal Structures, coinciding Venice Biennale. Bergman Gallery were involved with Anuanua Pride, also known as Cook Islands pride week, and hosted the pride wearable arts. The gallery also invite artists for residencies in the Cook Islands, previous residency artists included Taja Vaetoru and Matthew Payne.

Bergman Gallery's recent exhibitions included works by notable artists: Billy Apple, Reuben Paterson, Tungane Broadbent, Luise Fong, and Shannon Novak.

In 2026, Niuean artist with Cook Islands heritage, Marcus Hipa, had an exhibition about Niuean soldiers in World War I as part of New Zealand (Māori) Pioneer Battalion, titled The Luku and the Lion in Rarotonga.

== Represented artists ==
- Billy Apple
- Tungane Broadbent
- Fatu Feu'u
- Ian George
- Joan Gragg
- Lucas Grogan
- Andy Leleisi'uao
- Sylvia Marsters
- Tanja McMillan (Misery)
- Reuben Paterson
- Mahiriki Tangaroa
