= Viaduct Events Centre =

Former convention center in New Zealand

Coordinates: 36°50′28″S 174°45′32″E

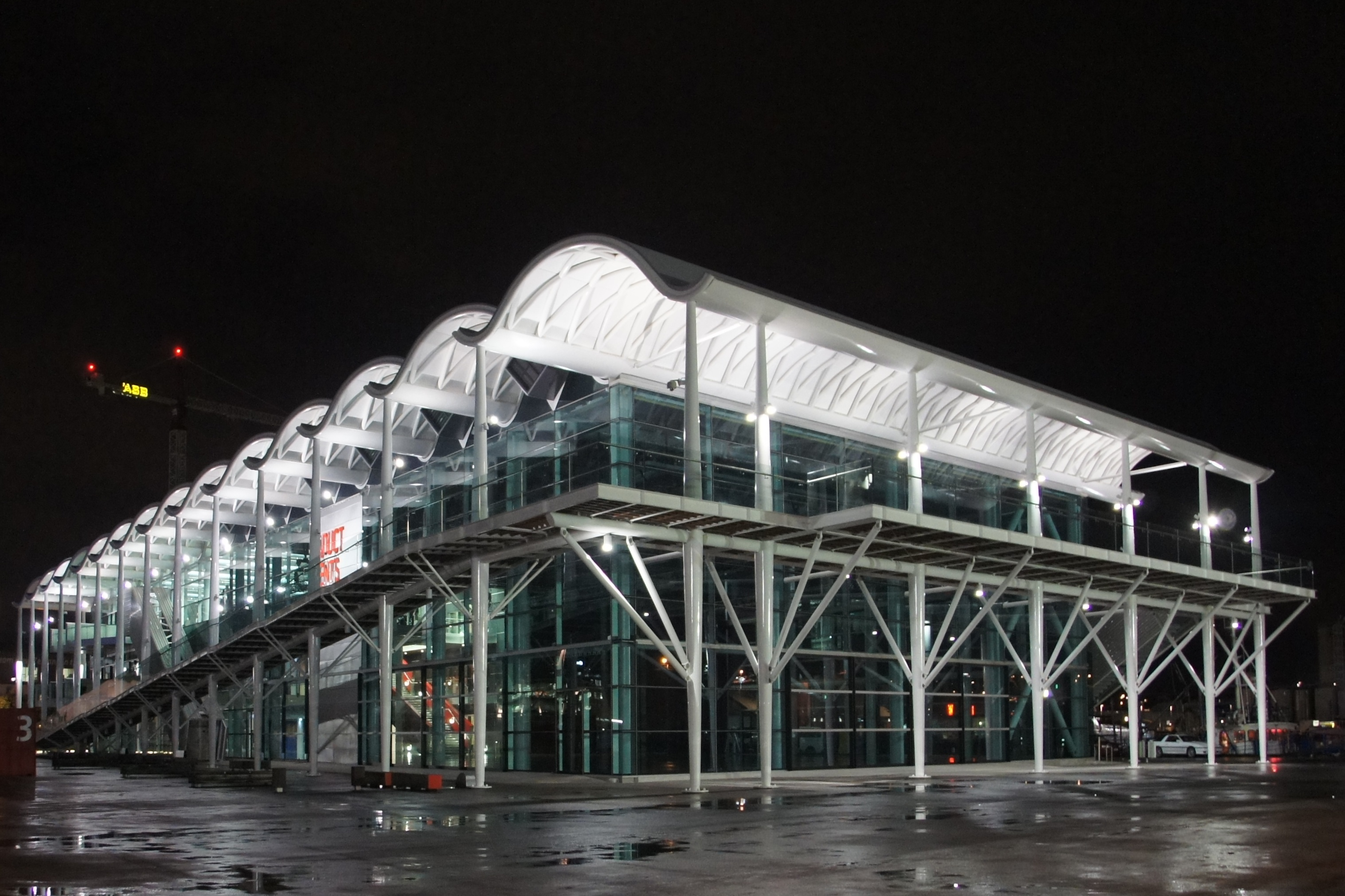
- The Viaduct Events Centre in 2012
- Interactive map of Viaduct Events Centre
- Location: Auckland CBD
- Owner: Auckland Conventions, Venues & Events, Auckland Council (indirectly through Tātaki Auckland Unlimited)
- Operator: Auckland Unlimited

Construction
- Built: 2011

The Viaduct Events Centre is a stand-alone, multi-purpose events centre built on the Halsey Street extension wharf, Wynyard Quarter of Auckland, New Zealand. Opened in August 2011 at a cost of approximately $32 million, the 6,000 square metres (65,000 sq ft) facility offered eight separate rooms suitable for a wide range of events including conferences, gala dinners and exhibitions.

Since opening, it hosted major events, most notably the New Zealand Fashion Week. The centre was also usually busy with numerous corporate functions, dinners and conferences. Several schools had also chosen the centre for their annual ball.

The Viaduct Events Centre was closed and was converted to be the home base of Emirates Team New Zealand in their defence efforts for the 36th America's Cup presented by Prada and run by The Royal New Zealand Yacht Squadron.

The Viaduct Events Centre reopened in 2023 under the ownership of Auckland Conventions, Venues & Events, a division of council controlled organisation, Tātaki Auckland Unlimited.
