= Leilani Kake =

New Zealand artist (born 1976)

- Born: 1976 (age 49–50); Rotorua, Bay of Plenty, New Zealand
- Education: Bachelor of Visual Arts (2002) from Manukau School of Visual Arts (University of Auckland), Certificate in Level 1 Te Ara Māori (2003) with Te Wānanga o Aotearoa, Post Graduate Diploma of Fine Arts (2005) with Manukau School of Visual Arts (University of Auckland), Diploma of Māori Language Fluency (2019) with Te Wānanga Takiura o Ngā Kura Kaupapa Māori o Aotearoa, Master of Fine Arts with Elam School of Fine Arts
- Parents: Richard Kake (Tainui, Ngāpuhi) (father); Julienne Greig (Rakahanga, Cook Island Māori, Caucasian American) (mother)

Leilani Kake (born 1976) is a New Zealand videographer and artist. Her artistic practice has expanded over time to involve a variety of both practical and educational roles nationally and internationally.

== Family background ==
She was born in Rotorua, but lived in Papua New Guinea as a child, and later settled in Ōtara, Auckland, although other sources suggest she is based in Ōtāhuhu, South Auckland.

== Career ==
It is suggested that her artistic career in video-based mediums began in the early 2000s. Her extensive academic background informed and built her practice starting with her Bachelor of Visual Arts in 2002 from the Manukau School of Visual Arts (University of Auckland), and then progressing with her Certificate in Level 1 Te Ara Māori in 2003 with Te Wānanga o Aotearoa, her Post Graduate Diploma of Fine Arts in 2005 with the Manukau School of Visual Arts (University of Auckland), her Diploma of Māori Language Fluency in 2019 with Te Wānanga Takiura o Ngā Kura Kaupapa Māori o Aotearoa, and her Master of Fine Arts with Elam School of Fine Arts.

Kake originally focused her work around video installations but this has evolved into multi-media work and her role as curator, educator and public speaker. Through portrayal of themes such as whakapapa, processes of change, and centring Indigenous stories, Kake has exhibited both nationally with Auckland Art Gallery, City Gallery Wellington, and Fresh Gallery Ōtara, and internationally in Australia, the Cook Islands, Fiji, France, Taiwan, and the United States.

=== A timeline of her roles ===
- 2000: Assistant Camera Operator for Shiva Gajan Festival, India for Manukau School of Visual Arts
- 2000: Intern and Model for Lisa Reihana's "Digital Marae" series
- 2003-2005: Camera Operator/Production Assistant for Tangata Whenua Television Ltd
- 2006: Videographer for the Department of Maori Studies at the University of Auckland
- 2007-2008: Performing Arts Co-ordinator at Ōtāhuhu College
- 2007: Project Coordinator for Niu Life: Manukau's Pacific People for Manukau City Council
- 2008: Moving Image Tutor for Te Tari o Mātauranga Māori at Manukau Institute of Technology
- 2009: Researcher for Te Aratai Productions
- 2010: Contextual Studies Lecturer at Manukau School of Visual Arts, Manukau Institute of Technology
- 2015: Gallery Coordinator for Papakura Art Gallery

== Exhibitions ==
Group exhibitions
Date	Title	People	Medium	Location	Source
2001	Red Earth Project	- -	- -	Te Tuhi Centre for the Arts, Auckland	
2004	South Contained Unit	- -	- -	ArtNet Gallery, Auckland	
2006	Launch Exhibition	- -	- -	Fresh Gallery Ōtara, Auckland	
2006	(Re)Locating Home	- -	- -	Alliance Française de Suva, Fiji / Fresh Gallery Ōtara, Auckland	
2006	What's Going On	- -	- -	Fresh Gallery Ōtara, Auckland	
2007	Fresh Gallery Ōtara turns 1!	- -	- -	Fresh Gallery Ōtara, Auckland	
2007	Longitude	- -	- -	The Art Studio, Rarotonga, Cook Islands	
2007	Ka'apai nuku, Ka'apai rangi - Lift the universe, lift the heavens	- -	- -	Fresh Gallery Ōtara, Auckland	
2008	I Te Marama - Into the Light	- -	- -	Nathan Homestead, Auckland	
2008	Meat & Lollies	- -	- -	Fresh Gallery Ōtara, Auckland	
2009	Le Folauga	- -	- -	Kaohsiung Museum of Fine Arts, Taiwan	
2009	Pan Pacific Nation	- -	- -	Marks Garage, Honolulu, Hawaii	
2010	Native Coconut	- -	- -	Fresh Gallery Ōtara, Auckland	
2010	manu toi; artists and messengers	- -	- -	Māngere Arts Centre - Ngā Tohu o Uenuku	
7 July - 22 October 2012	Home AKL	Edith Amituanai, Graham Fletcher, Tanu Gago, Foufili Halagigie, Niki Hastings-McFall, Louisa Humphry, Lonnie Hutchinson, Ioane Ioane, Leilani Kake, Lakiloko Keakea, Shigeyuki Kihara, Kolokesa Kulīkefu, Jeremy Leatinu'u, Andy Leleisi'uao, Janet Lilo, Joana Monolagi, Ani O'Neill, Sēmisi Fetokai Potauaine, John Pule, Greg Semu, Siliga David Setoga, Paul Tangata, Angela Tiatia, Sopolemalama Filipe Tohi, Teuane Tibbo, Hūlita Tupou, Jim Vivieaere, and Kaetaeta Watson	Multi-media Pacific Contemporary art	Auckland Art Gallery	
10-31 January 2015	Between Wind and Water	Leilani Kake, Luisa Tora, and Tanu Gago	Video and multi-media installation	Enjoy Contemporary Art Space	
9 March - 1 April 2017	Swallow series in The Perpetual Flux of Transitional Otherness	Leilani Kake, and others	Five digital prints	Olly, Mt Eden, Auckland	
December 2019	Woman of Colour in Finding Emory: A Poster Show	Cypris Afakasi, Tanu Gago, Leilani Kake, Sean Kerrigan, Huriana Kopeke-Te Aho, Rebecca Ann Hobbs, Siliga David Setoga and Tokerau Wilson	Poster/Digital Image	Vunilagi Vou	
August 2022	Putiputi in Vunilagi Vou's new site opening	Nigel Borell, Ercan Cairns, Chris van Doren, Dr Sione Faletau, Antonio Filipo, Tanu Gago, Leilani Kake, and Niutuiatua Lemalu.	Video	Vunilagi Vou, East Tāmaki site, South Auckland	

=== Home AKL ===
This exhibition was significant for its contributions of contemporary Pacific arts for the first group show of its kind shown in Auckland Art Gallery. The show was curated by the gallery's senior curator of New Zealand and Pacific Art, Ron Brownson, Julia Waite, Fresh Gallery Ōtara's Ema Tavola, Nina Tonga, and Kolokesa Māhina-Tuai. As mentioned previously over 20 artists got involved in the exhibition, with both emerging and established artists mostly residing in Auckland but coming from varying backgrounds having the opportunity to showcase a range of works. All united by key thematics of what home can represent, mediums of the works include painting, sculpture, photography, videography, adornment pieces, gallery collection items from Auckland Art Gallery, and a total of 13 new commissions by multiple artists. Alongside the exhibition other events were run by the gallery and artists such as family-friendly events, artist talks and opportunities for community gathering and knowledge sharing. A publication in the form of an exhibition catalogue was also released in 2012 by the gallery entitled Home AKL: Artists of Pacific Heritage in Auckland.

Solo exhibitions
Date	Title	Medium	Location	Source
2004	Te Kirihaehae/The Cutting of the Skin	Multi-monitored video performance installation involving two tonnes of sand	Ōtara Community Courtyard, Auckland	
2007	Ariki	Single channel, PAL video format (5min 54sec)	Auckland Art Gallery	
2008	Ariki/Talking Tivaevae	- -	MIC Toi Rerehiko Media and Interdisciplinary Arts Centre	
2009	Get Up Stand Up	Performance	de Young Museum of Fine Arts, San Francisco	
2009	Tino Rangatira Tanga	- -	Corban Estate Arts Centre	
3 April 2010 - 13 June 2010	Leilani Kake: Tino Rangatira Tanga	Film	Deane Gallery, City Gallery Wellington Te Whare Toi	
2011	Ngā Hau E Whā - The Four Winds	Four channel video installation	Auckland Arts Festival 2011, Fresh Gallery Ōtara 4 March - 16 April 2011	
2018	Mata Ariki	Video	- -	

== Projects ==
- 1998: Te Whakatupuranga - Whakawhanaungatanga. This commission, in collaboration with Ngapuhi carver Pat Kake, resulted in a permanent standing multi-media install for the Environmental Risk Management Authority's Wellington office.
- 2006: Minimal - Baroque. She was commissioned on as a videographer for an art residency project by Juan Castillo, exhibited at Fresh Gallery Ōtara and St Paul St Gallery Auckland.
- 2007: Reflections. A video-based commission piece for composer Opeloge Ah Sam, for the TelstraClear Pacific Events Centre Auckland.
- 2017: Pacific Bodies: Ema Tavola and Leilani Kake. An interview/conversation between the two artists in response to The Body Laid Bare: Masterpieces from Tate at Auckland Art Gallery.
- 2018: A Maternal Lens x Tales from Water Margins - a curatorial project for the 4th International Biennale of Casablanca, funded by Creative New Zealand. The project included work by the following artists: Margaret Aull, Leilani Kake, Julia Mage'au Gray, Kolokesa Māhina-Tuai, and Vaimaila Urale.

Panels/talks
Date	Title	Role	Location	Source
2008	Pacific Island Media Association Conference	Presenter	AUT, Auckland	
2009	Urban Pacific Art from Aotearoa	Presenter	College Art Association Conference, California, USA	
2009	- -	Guest speaker	Center for Race and Gender, University of California Berkeley, California, USA	
2009	- -	Guest speaker	University of California Santa Cruz, California, USA	
2009	- -	Guest speaker	Marks Garage, Honolulu, Hawaii	
November 2010	Appearance on Tagata Pasifika [TVNZ]	TV appearance	TVNZ	
15 January 2015	Artist Talk: Leilani Kake	Speaker	Enjoy Contemporary Art Space	

In 2013 alongside Ema Tavola, Kake was invited to speak at the Pacific Art Association's 11th International Symposium in Vancouver, Canada. The two artists received the opportunity after their successful panel in 2009 to the Pacific Islands Students Association at Berkeley University in Los Angeles, and later lectures throughout multiple Californian universities when invited to speak at one of the most significant visual arts events in the US, the 97th College Arts Association Annual Conference. Kake and Tavola organised a fundraising campaign called 2 Girls, 1 Conference where they sold t-shirts and ran an art auction to raise the funds to travel to and present at the conference.

== Awards ==
- 2007 winner of ARTsource from the Arts Regional Trust.
- 2008 Salamander Gallery Emerging Artist Award at Creative New Zealand's Arts Pasifika Awards.
