= Jasmine Togo-Brisby =

South Sea Islander artist

Jasmine Togo-Brisby (born 1982) is a South Sea Islander artist known for her sculpture installations and portrait photographs. She currently resides in Wellington and is one of few artists that centres Pacific slave labour as the focus of her practice.

== Early life ==
Togo-Brisby was born in 1982 in Murwillumbah, New South Wales, Australia. The early years of her life were spent in Tweed Heads, northern New South Wales. and then later in Townsville and Mackay, Queensland. She traces her ancestral lineage to the islands of Ambae and Santo that make up the Pacific nation Vanuatu.

Her first memories of looking at South Sea archives is how her interest in photography began. South Sea Island culture developed out of these documented images. On an annual basis she remembers as a child, her community searching through archives to piece together their history and locate their ancestors. Togo-Brisby's multidisciplinary art practice is described as being "personally motivated" by curator, Gordon-Smith. Togo-Brisby says:

Through my work I’m trying to create another space for our ancestors to exist within.

Subsequent to completing High School, Togo-Brisby relocated to Brisbane in 2012 Togo-Brisby and completed a Diploma of Visual Art at the Southbank Institute of Technology. She went on to study a Bachelor Degree (Honours), in Fine Art at Massey University, Te Whanganui-a-Tara/Wellington and Griffith University, Southbank, Brisbane completing in 2017. In 2019 she studied for a Masters in Fine Art also at Massey University.

== Career ==
Togo-Brisby is best known for her exploration of South Sea Islanders and the historical to present-day impact slavery has had on her community.

Togo-Brisby's sculpture Bittersweet (2013–2015) was first exhibited in Aotearoa at Te Uru, curated by Ioana Gordon-Smith. The catalyst for this work was the uncovering of a large scale unmarked burial ground on what was previously a plantation in the northeastern state of Queensland in Australia. The work is described: "Installed on a plinth in a dark gallery, a pile of skulls cast in unrefined sugar and resin glisten under the gallery lights, giving off a sickly-sweet smell."

Her exhibition Dear Mrs Wunderlich (2020), alludes to the unearthing of records she had been investigating that authenticate the blackbirding (Note: Blackbirding was a commonly used colloquial term for the Pacific slave trade.) of her great-great-grandmother, who became the legal property of the Wunderlich family in the 1800s.

She opened her first major solo exhibition Hom Swit Hom (2022) at Artspace Mackay in Mackay, Queensland. Togo-Brisby says:

Mackay has the largest population of Australian South Sea Islanders, so this is a monumental exhibition for me and something that has been a long time coming.

== Solo exhibitions ==
2013

- Jugglers Art Space, Brisbane

2019

- Birds of Passage, Dunedin School of Art, Dunedin
- Adrift, Page Blackie Gallery, Wellington

2020

- Dear Mrs Wunderlich Page Galleries
- If these walls could talk, they'd tell you my name, Courtenay Place Park Light Boxes, Wellington
- From Bones and Bellies, CoCa, Christchurch

2022

- Hom Swit Hom Artspace Mackay, Queensland, Australia

== Group exhibitions ==
2013

- Head & Sole, Logan Art Gallery, Logan Central, Queensland, Australia
- Echoes ASSI 150, The Centre Beaudesert, Beaudesert, Queensland, Australia
- Memories from a Forgotten People: 150 Years of Australian South Sea Islander, State Library of Queensland, Southbank, Australia
- Journey Blong Yumi: Australian South Sea Islander, Logan Art Gallery, Logan Central, Queensland, Australia

2014

- DNA: Deadly Nui Art, Black Dot Gallery, Melbourne, Victoria, Australia. Artists: Jasmine Togo-Brisby, Tony Tai, Damien Shen, Mariaa Randall, Francis Tapueluelu, Chanel Winarti, and Lily Aitui Laita

2015

- Fish hooks & Moving Trees (touring exhibition), BEMAC, Brisbane + Bundaberg Regional Art Gallery, Queensland, Australia
- From here to there (touring exhibition), Pine Rivers Museum + Noosa Regional Art Gallery, Queensland, Australia

2016

- Influx (touring exhibition), St Paul Street Gallery, Auckland + Pataka Art + Museum, Porirua, Wellington
- Handle with Care, Te Uru, Auckland
- Fifty Shades of Blak, Black Dot Gallery, Victoria, Australia
- Vai Niu Wai Niu Coconut Water, Caboolture Regional Art Gallery, Queensland, Australia

2017

- Colonial Sugar - Tracey Moffat & Jasmine Togo-Brisby, City Gallery Wellington, Wellington

2018

- Worn Identities, New Zealand Portrait Gallery, Wellington
- Seeing Moana Oceania, Auckland Art Gallery/Toi o Tāmaki, Auckland
- OCEANIA, Beaudesert Regional Gallery, Queensland
- From where I stand, my eye will send a light to you in the North, Te Tuhi Centre for the Arts, Auckland
- WANKTOK (touring exhibition), Dowse Art Museum, Lower Hutt, Wellington + Māngere Arts Centre - Ngā Tohu o Uenuku, Auckland

2019

- Tākiri: An Unfurling, New Zealand Maritime Museum, Auckland
- Beyond Kapene Kuku/Captain Cook, Page Blackie Gallery, Wellington
- Auckland Art Fair, The Cloud, Queens Wharf, Auckland
- Plantation Voices: Contemporary conversations with Australian South Sea Islanders, State Library of Queensland, Australia

2020

- Mana Moana:Volume 2: Digital Ocean, (17–25 July) Wellington, New Zealand. Artists: Dr Karlo Mila, Michel Tuffery, Dr Johnson Witehira, Warren Maxwell, Jasmine Togo-Brisby, Kereama Taepa, Louise Potiki Bryant, Tina Ngata, Terri Ripeka Crawford, Kura Puke, Stuart Foster, Kurt Komene, Horomona Horo, Laughton Kora, Regan Balzer, Cathy Livermore, Jess Feast, Rob Thorne. Curated by Rachael Rakena and Mike Bridgman

2022

- Declaration: A Pacific Feminist Agenda, Auckland Art Gallery, Toi o Tāmaki, Tāmaki Makarau, New Zealand. Artists: Jasmine Togo-Brisby, Marti Friedlander, Jessicoco Hansell, Taloi Havini, Lonnie Hutchinson, Ioane Ioane, Sione Monū, Suzanne Tāmaki, Latai Taumoepeau, Molly Rangiwai-McHale & Luisa Tora and Kalisolaite ’Uhila.

== Awards and residencies ==
- 2016 – Pasifika Excellence Awards – Massey University
- 2017 – Pasifika Excellence Awards – Massey University
- 2019 – Tautai | Otago Polytechnic Dunedin School of Art – Artist in Residence
