= Te Moemoea no Iotefa =

Te Moemoea no Iotefa was the first exhibition held in a civic art gallery in New Zealand focused on contemporary Pacific art.

== Exhibition ==
The exhibition was curated by art historian Rangihiroa Panoho for the Sarjeant Art Gallery in Whanganui in 1990 and the metropolitan City Galleries in Wellington and in Auckland in 1991. Its starting point and its iconic motif was a Tahitian tivaevae featuring the Genesis story of the 'Dream of Joseph' or Te moemoea no Iotefa. The exhibition initially filled all spaces of the historic Sarjeant Gallery building, an earlier version of the Wellington City Art Gallery and the entire first floor of the Auckland Art Gallery. In the exhibition catalogue Panoho outlined the South Pacific as, 'Aotearoa's most immediate historical, geographical and cultural context', and that he was seeking to 'examine and explore the visual side of this context and the ways in which artists in this country are exploring it'. The exhibition brought together four strands of art making:

1. The wealth of material culture from the Pacific Islands found in museums, libraries, private collections - taonga such as historical writing, photographs, tapa, tivaevae, weaving and carving.

2. Work currently being produced by Pacific Islanders living in New Zealand such as tivaevae and carving.

3. Work by palagi artists in this country (e.g. Fomison, Shepherd, Lynn, Lett, Hanly, McMillan, Adams, and Jowitt) which constitutes a response to Pacific Island subject and motif.

4. Work by contemporary Pacific artists utilising a Western aesthetic - to draw on and interpret their particular island cultures.

The exhibition 'wove together the various aspects of Pacific culture as it persists in Aotearoa'. Art historian Nicholas Thomas writes 'Museum artifacts were placed with contemporary art, folk crafts with paintings, archive photographs with contemporary images, and Pacific artists among white appropriators of culture'.

The exhibition catalogue contains interviews with 10 contemporary artists included in the show:

- Iosefa Leo
- Fatu Feu'u
- Jim Vivieaere
- Lily Laita
- John Pule
- Michel Tuffery
- Johnny Peninsula
- Ioane Ioane
- Sale Jessop
- Filipe Tohi

Te Moemoea was also an exploration of Pacificness as it more diversely related to broader creative activity in Aotearoa. As curator Panoho was not exclusively looking at contemporary Pacific art. As with his show 'Whatu Aho Rua' (1989/1992 - another Sarjeant exhibition involving historical and contemporary material) he was also interested in historical Pacific collections of tapa, fibre, photography and carving and in how non-Pacific artists were working with Pacific communities and in how they were interpreting the material and the ideas that they valorised. Te Moemoea while initiated from within a regional institution travelled to and was reinvented by Panoho and gallery staff within the Whanganui, Wellington and Auckland gallery spaces. A newspaper review from Wellington helps clarify the complexity and the layered nature of the content within Te Moemoea: 'Cross-currents crackle around the latest exhibition at Wellington's City Gallery. People who like to keep art in neat pigeonholes... will probably find Te Moemoea no Iotefa (Joseph's dream defeats them. Rangihīroa Panoho...has curated a lively exhibition which aims to be a lot more than a showcase for artists with a Pacific Island background who are working in New Zealand. It is that, but it's also a visual essay about cross-fertilisation.'

== Reception and influence ==
Te Moemoea no Iotefa has been described as 'the first group exhibition to celebrate the dynamism of Pacific art'.

Pacific art historian Peter Brunt saw Te Moemoea as, 'The first exhibition to focus on contemporary Pacific art in a civic gallery in New Zealand was Te Moemoea no Iotefa '[the Dream of Joseph: A Celebration of Pacific Art and Taonga]...The exhibition thematized the presence of Pacific culture in New Zealand society, introduced community-based arts like tivaevae into the contemporary gallery, and canvassed the work of migrant artists like Fatu Feu'u, Johnny Penisula, Michel Tuffery and others, only then beginning to garner serious public attention. But it was the title that was the most prescient about its own historical significance. The title was borrowed from the title of a tivaevae it showed, and refers to the biblical story of Joseph sold into slavery in Egypt by his brothers, eventually to rise to a position of power in the Pharaoh's court. Joseph's dream turns out to be an allegory of the moment of recognition when, as an exile, he reveals himself to his brothers as the important person he has become. The ambiguity of the allegory lies in the question of whether recognition in Egypt or escape from Egypt (if we can pardon the Orientalism) is the preferable goal.'

The exhibition contributed to a sense of group identification amongst a group of young or emerging artists, including Ioane, Tuffery, Laita and John Pule.The exhibition is seen as an important precursor to Bottled Ocean, a 1994 exhibition focused on the work of contemporary Pacific artists.

Art historian Karen Stevenson notes the importance of the exhibition in building the careers of participating artists:

With the success of Te Moemoea no Iotefa, Pacific artists found exhibition space more readily available, and as recognition of Pacific artists grew, dealer galleries and community centers became interested in hosting "Pacific" exhibitions. Group "Pacific" shows became regular occurrences in art galleries throughout the country, as did solo exhibitions at dealer galleries."
