= Pihigia =

Pihigia is a Niuean surname. Notable Niueans with the name include:

- Fisa Igilisi Pihigia, politician and diplomat
- Molima Molly Pihigia, weaver and healthcare worker
- Togiavalu Pihigia, previous Speaker of the Niuean Assembly
