= Margaret Aull =

New Zealand painter and curator

Margaret Aull is a New Zealand painter, art manager, and curator. She works in mixed media using canvas, installations and sculpture to contribute to and comment on Māori and Pacific artistic discourse. Her work has been exhibited both nationally and internationally, showcasing work at the Casablanca Biennale, Morocco in 2018.

Along with her own art practice she is an advocate for Māori arts, serving as an advisor on Te Atinga Māori Visual Arts Board, Creative New Zealand, Hamilton City Council Arts Advisory Forum and Creative Waikato's Māori Arts Advisory Group.

== Biography ==
Aull studied Māori and Pacific arts at Te Wānanga o Aotearoa. In 2008 she completed her Bachelor of Media Arts at Waikato Institute of Technology. For her Masters she studied at Whitecliffe College of Arts and Design. Her thesis investigated "the notion of tapu/tabu (sacredness) in relation to objects as visual representations of ancestors and gods."

Her first solo exhibition in 2008 was titled Na Kena Yali and was held at the Chartwell Gallery in Hamilton. She has produced two further solo exhibitions in 2013 and 2014. Her second solo exhibition was titled Concealed Ancestors and was shown at Papakura Art Gallery. Her third was held at OREXART in Auckland.

In 2017 she exhibited alongside fellow artist-curator Nigel Borell in their joint exhibition Karanga Hokianga which was shown at Village Arts Gallery, Hokianga.

In 2018 she exhibited her work in a show called “A Maternal Lens” which was held at Casablanca Biennale, Morocco. This exhibition was curated by Ema Tavola and also included the works of Julia Mage’au Gray, Leilani Kake, Kolokesa Māhina-Tuai and Vaimaila Urale. Her work in this exhibition was titled 'Tai Aroha' and was made from Pāua. The title references a waiata that describes love like a tide that ebbs and flows. Aull describes it as "when one tide is out, the other is full; it is a synthesising relationship of how I acknowledge the two cultural foundations as a body of water."

Aull was appointed to Te Ātinga in 2016, a contemporary Māori visual arts committee. As part of this committee she serves as an advocate for Māori artists.

She is also part of The Veiqia Project, a creative research project investigating the practice of Veiqia that was founded in 2015. The work of the Veiqia Project includes shared research, public events and exhibitions. One of these exhibitions was iLakolako ni weniqia: a Veiquia project which was shown at the Physics Room in Christchurch.

Aull is of Māori (Te Rarawa, Tūwharetoa) and Fijian descent.
