= List of museums in Tonga =

This is a list of museums in Tonga.

- Afā Eli Historical Museum and Research Library
- Tonga Maritime Museum
- Tonga National Museum
- Tonga Traditions Committee
- Tuku'aho Memorial Museum

== See also ==
- List of libraries in Tonga
- List of archives in Tonga
- List of museums by country
