= Bethany Edmunds =

New Zealand artist, curator and weaver

- Born: 1978 (age 47–48)
- Other name: Miss b.Me
- Occupations: weaver, textile artist, museum professional and hip hop lyricist
- Known for: weaving and artworks

Bethany Matai Edmunds (born 1978) is a New Zealand Māori weaver, textile artist, museum professional and hip hop lyricist. She is affiliated with Ngāti Kurī iwi. Her works are held in the collection of the Auckland City Gallery.

== Biography ==
Edmunds was born in 1978. She has a Bachelor of Applied Arts: Māori Design and Technology and while studying received tutoring from the renowned cloak weaver Nikki Lawrence. Edmunds went on to study at New York University where she gained a Master of Arts degree. She investigated the conservation, storage and display of Māori cloaks across four museums in the United States of America. While in America she was chosen to work as an intern at the National Museum of the American Indian. She has worked for the Auckland War Memorial Museum as a youth outreach programmer and has also been involved in the museum's Te Awe project. Edmunds also works to ensure the survival of korowai (cloak) weaving.

== Art ==
Edmunds is a multidisciplinary artist, with weaving being an integral part of her practice. She uses the knowledge she has obtained from both her Māori and Pākehā heritage to interpret her traditional knowledge into contemporary artworks. Artworks created by Edmunds are held in the collection of the Auckland City Gallery. She has exhibited her art around New Zealand and internationally. She is a member of The Pacific Sisters, an art collective of Māori and Pacific women.

Edmunds is also a hip hip lyricist. She uses the name Miss b.Me and is a member of the band Kinaki.

== Awards and honours ==
- 2009 Recipient of the Kate Sheppard Memorial Trust National Award

== Exhibitions ==
- pART mAOri, Cambridge Museum of Archaeology and Anthropology, Cambridge, UK 2006.
- Ngā Pai ō Hina, Auckland Central City Library, Auckland 2018.
- Te Kōpū, Māngere Arts Centre Ngā Tohu o Uenuku, Auckland 2018.
- Toi Tū Toi Ora: Contemporary Māori Art, Auckland Art Gallery Toi o Tāmaki, Auckland 2020.
