= Tonga National Museum =

Museum in Tonga

Coordinates: 21.1335°S 175.2002°W

- Tonga National Museum
- Formation: 1998
- Type: Governmental organisation
- Purpose: Culture and heritage
- Official language: Tongan

The Tonga National Museum is a national museum located in Nukuʻalofa, Tonga.

== Background ==
The Tonga National Museum was established in 1998. Prior to its opening, displays of artefacts were held in the Tonga National Cultural Centre. Soon after its establishment, it was hoped that Tongan objects from across the world would be loaned back to the country for display, and that the TNM would be able to export touring exhibitions globally.

The first exhibition to be held at the museum was entitled 'From the Stone Age to the Space Age in 200 Years: Tongan Art and Society on the Eve of the Millennium' which opened on 4 July 1998. It was curated by Adrienne Kaeppler and featured objects on loan from institutions in the US, as well as Fiji, and Tonga's own collections. It also included objects from Princess Pilulevu Tuita's private collection. The exhibition also included shoes made of fau (hibiscus fibre) worn by Queen Salote to the coronation of Elizabeth II in 1953.

== Collection ==
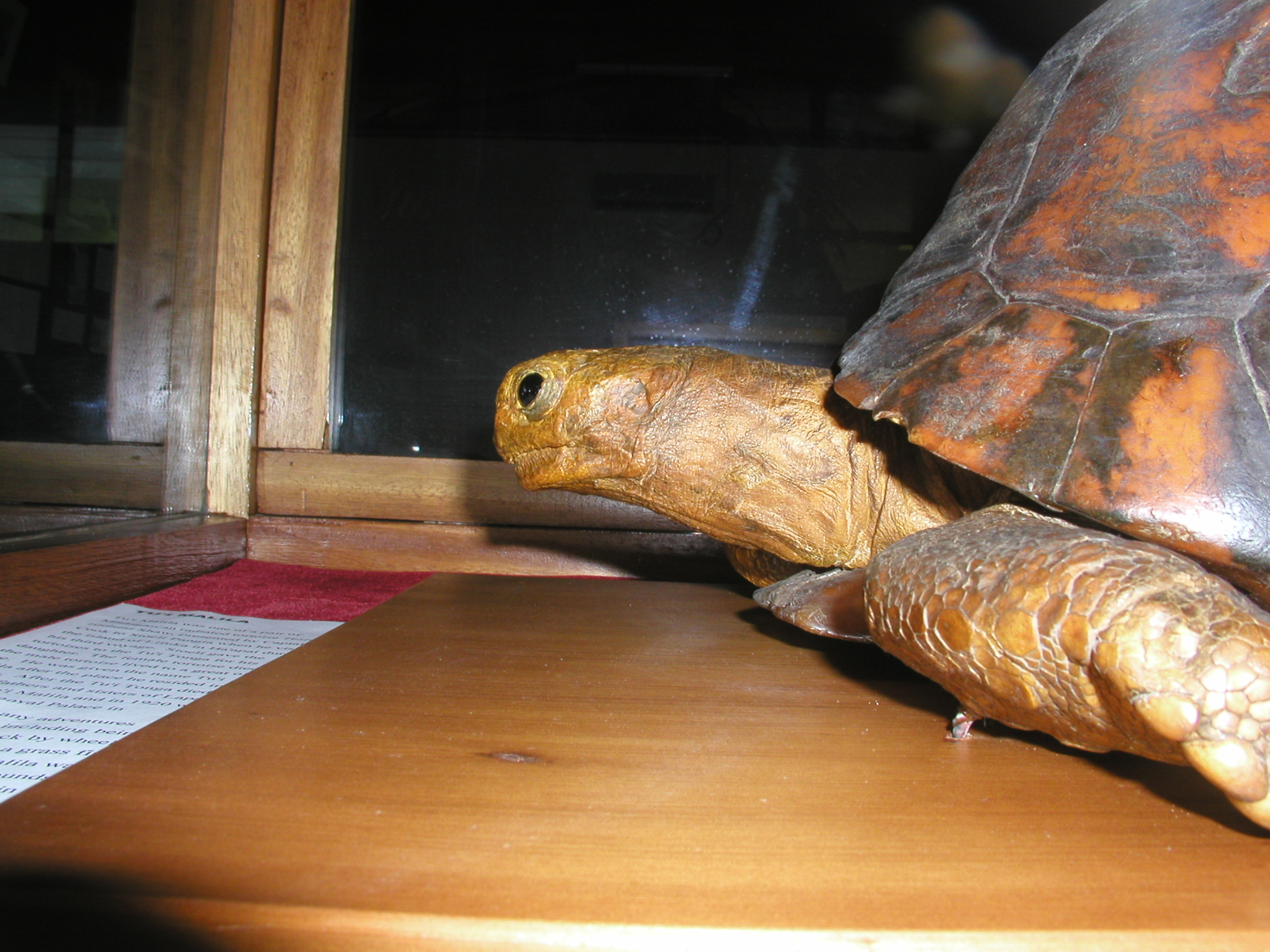
Tu'i Malila

Tonga National Museum has a wide-ranging collection, including models of indigenous boats, photographs and objects relating to the royal family. It also has an archaeological collection of Lapita culture ceramics. It also holds a collection of material relating to Tonga traditional textiles, including several kupesi tui. The museum has a focus on historical and contemporary Tongan works of art.

The collection also includes Tu'i Malila, a radiated tortoise who reportedly lived to 189 years old and had been given as a gift to the king of Tonga by James Cook. Tu'i Malila died in 1966 and was preserved as a taxidermy specimen in the lobby of the International Dateline Hotel until they were transferred to the museum.

== Closure ==
The museum closed to the public due to a lack of funding. Its collections were transferred to Tupou College Museum. By 2014 there were calls for the museum to be re-established - in particular as a home for archaeological archives.

== Revival ==
In 2017 a project began to explore the possibility of reopening the museum. It was supported by the then Minister of Tourism, Semisi Sika, curator Kolokesa Māhina-Tuai and sculptors Tui’one Pulotu & Steven Fehoko, amongst others. A feasibility study demonstrated that there was a need to re-establish the institution. The redevelopment was funded by the Ministry of Tourism. In 2017 staff from Tonga visited Fiji Museum for training in museum management.

The Tonga National Museum was reopened on 30 October 2020 by HRH Salote Pilolevu Mafile’o Tuita at the Queen Salote Memorial Hall. She gave a speech stating that the national museum has a key role in preserving the heritage of Tonga. Collectors Mark and Carolyn Blackburn loaned objects from their private collection to the museum for the reopening.

== Administration ==
The CEO is Sione Moala Mafi. As of 2020, the museum was open five days per week, from Monday to Friday. The museum is run by staff from the Culture Division of the Ministry of Tourism and Heritage.

== Location ==
The Tonga National Museum is located in Nuku'alofa; it is close to the Tonga National Cultural Centre and Tonga Botanical Gardens.

== See also ==
- List of museums in Tonga
- List of national museums
