= Falepipi he Mafola =

Niuean handicraft group

- Formation: 1 April 1993; 31 years ago
- Headquarters: Ōtāhuhu, Auckland, New Zealand
- Products: Niuean handicrafts

Falepipi he Mafola ("House of Peace") is a Niuean handicrafts group based in New Zealand.

The organisation's members first came together on 1 April 1993, and Falepipi he Mafola was formally incorporated on 19 August 1994. It was founded with the aim of empowering older Niueans and bringing them together as a community, as well as sustaining their connection to their home island. Its members meet weekly in the Auckland suburb of Ōtāhuhu.

Its founding members included Molima Molly Pihigia, who migrated from Niue to New Zealand in 1970, and her husband Fataiki Pihigia. Other notable members have included Tiresa Fasi, Foufili Halagigie, and Mokahele Halagigie. Although its mission centres older craftspeople, members range in age from their 30s to their 90s; they are primarily women.

Falepipi he Mafola primarily produces Niuean woven handicrafts such as lili (wall hangings), iliili (hand fans), trays, and baskets. Other handicrafts produced include carvings and netting. Its members generally use materials that are easier to source in Auckland, such as raffia, kaniu (coconut leaf ribs), and recycled plastic, rather than the traditional laufa (pandanus leaves). The group has also released recordings of Niuean songs and hymns, including 2005's Niue Haku Motu Volume 1 and 2010's Fanogonogo Ke He Leo Volume 2, and worked to promote the Niuean language.

In 2009, the organisation was awarded the Pacific Heritage Art Award as part of the Arts Pasifika Awards for its "active community engagement with promotion of Niuean heritage arts." Pieces produced by the group are included in the collection of Te Papa, New Zealand's national museum.
