= Bottled Ocean =

Bottled Ocean was an exhibition of work by New Zealand artists of Pacific Island descent that was shown at a number of metropolitan art galleries in New Zealand in 1994–1995. It featured the work artists who have become notable figures in New Zealand and internationally.

== Curatorial intent ==
Jim Vivieaere, a New Zealand artist of Rarotongan descent, was commissioned by touring exhibition company Exhibitour to curate an exhibition of contemporary Pacific Island artists. City Gallery Wellington was a partner in the exhibition.

The exhibition was not a straightforward survey or 'celebration' of Pacific artists. Organising the exhibition turned Vivieaere into a spokesperson or authority on Pacific Island art, a position he was uneasy with. He was concerned that the exhibition could lead to artists being pigeon-holed or 'ghettoised' or that stereotypes of the 'exotic' Pacific could be reinforced. In one interview Vivieaere said that the ‘only reason we are here is that we are Polynesian – not on our merits but because we’re the "other".... We don't need Polynesian shows. I would like to see it as the last.’

== Artists ==
Vivieaere selected a broad range of artists who worked in a variety of media and were at different stages of their careers. Most of them were born in New Zealand but had ties to Samoa, Niue, the Cook Islands and Tonga.

Twenty-three artists formed the core exhibition:

- Fatu Feu'u
- William Furneaux
- Patriq Futialo
- Bruce George
- Niki Hastings-McFall
- Ioane Ioane
- Lily Laita
- Iosefa Leo
- Simmie Nichols
- Johnny Peninsula
- Lyle Peninsula
- Laugutu Poloai
- John Pule
- Ani O'Neill
- Albert Refiti
- Toegamau Tom Sefo
- Greg Semu
- Tania Short
- Filipe Tohi
- Michel Tuffery
- Lape Fakalaga Tulisi
- Veronica Vaevae
- Loretta Young

As the exhibition progressed other artists were added including Evotia Tamu, Sheyne Tuffery, Luana Asiata, Sasha Kronfeld, Glenda Vilisoni, Sale Jessop and the musical group Grace (made up of brothers Anthony, Jason and Paul Ioasa).

== Display ==
Bottled Ocean launched at City Gallery Wellington in 1994 and toured to Auckland Art Gallery, Waikato Art Gallery (now Waikato Museum), the Manawatu Art Gallery (now Te Manawa) and the McDougall Art Annex (now Christchurch Art Gallery) throughout 1994 and 1995.

Vivieaere changed the display of the exhibition for each location. At City Gallery Wellington the works were displayed on a mirrored floor behind a perspex wall, mimicking museum cabinets or shop window displays. and creating a forced distance between the art and the viewer. At the Auckland Art Gallery a mirrored floor was used and some of the works remained in their travelling crates or were partly unpacked. At the Robert McDougall Art Annex Michel Tuffery's sculpture Pisupo Lua Afe, a life-size bull made out of flattened corned-beef cans, was positioned as if it was gazing at a wall of art works like a visitor.

== Reception and influence ==
Bottled Ocean has been noted for being one of the first exhibitions to focus on contemporary Pacific artists and for its underlying concerns. The exhibition was discussed at length in the publication accompanying Paradise Now: Contemporary Art from the Pacific, the first major exhibition of contemporary Pacific art to show in a United States museum. It is also discussed in the recent book Art in Oceania: A New History:

Bottled Ocean made the 'arrival' of contemporary Pacific art in the elite galleries of the New Zealand art world a problem to be reflected upon, rather than simply a triumph to celebrate. Having been invited to survey the work of Pacific migrants, Vivieaere turned the exhibition into something of an installation, a work of art in its own right, in which he used various exhibitionary devices to make the desire for 'cultural difference' and 'otherness', which had become broadly topical in the artworld, the implicit subject of the exhibition.

Reviewing the exhibition for Art AsiaPacific Wendy Vaigro wrote

As the ostensible organising principle of Bottled Ocean, 'Pacific Islandness' is utilised as a term that references, ironically, attempts to homogenise Polynesian artists working in New Zealand. ... In challenging the closure of aesthetic and political categories and conventional curatorial practices, Jim Vivieaere creates Bottled Ocean as a meta-exhibition. The result is a subtle and thoughtful show that eludes ideological control and authoritative discourse at every turn.

In a review for Art New Zealand, Nicholas Thomas investigated Vivieaere's reference to a 'modern tribal art market' in the brochure accompanying the exhibition. He observed that 'the work in Bottled Ocean is produced for and around a market - not just an art market, but a contemporary global cultural market, a multicultural theatre in which identities, signatures, nationalities and lifestyles are affirmed, celebrated, changed and consumed.'. He continued:

The mainstream audience may be primarily interested in the tropical colourfulness of the work, in the apparent conformity of its spirituality with New Age environmentalism, in its exoticism. Artists appear to have responded to this interest by making exoticism visually explicit through the use of readily recognizable Polynesian motifs. ... The distinctive accomplishment of Bottled Ocean lies in its direct but subtle challenge to this consumerist interest interest in Pacific art and culture.

== Further information ==
- Review of Art in Oceania: A New History discussing Bottled Ocean in the Times Literary Supplement (2013)
- Obituary of Jim Vivieaere, Art AsiaPacific (2011)
