= Niki Hastings-McFall =

New Zealand painter (born 1959)

- Born: 1959 (age 66–67)
- Education: Manukau Institute of Technology, Bachelor of Visual Arts (Jewellery)
- Known for: Jewellery, fine art

Niki Hastings-McFall (born 1959) is a New Zealand jeweller and artist of Samoan and Pākehā descent. She has been described by art historian Karen Stevenson as one of the core members of a group of artists of Pasifika descent who brought contemporary Pacific art to 'national prominence and international acceptance'.

== Background and education ==
In 2000 Hastings-McFall graduated from the Manukau Institute of Technology with a Bachelor of Visual Arts majoring in Jewellery. Much of her work references her Samoan heritage, which she began learning about when she first met her father in 1992.

== Work ==
Hastings-McFall's work has been informed by her experience of growing up within Pakeha culture and later learning about her Samoan heritage. Among the issues that inform her work are 'the effects of Christianity and colonialism in the Pacific, loss of culture, the transplantation of Pacific Islanders to large cities and the shaping of traditional culture to fit contemporary urban culture'.

Although she began making jewellery, Hastings-McFall found within a few years that she needed to extend beyond this:

'I found it [jewellery] brought up other things I wanted to explore. I was really interested in jewellery, researching and exploring, but that led to other things I couldn't do with jewellery. I wanted to make objects without the whole conversation about body adornment. Today there are definitely elements of jewellery and jewellery-making in my work. I don't deny it or repress it. I've always been inclined to making objects about ideas.'

Hastings-McFall's work often references cultural stereotyping of the Pacific through the use of everyday material objects. She makes frequent use of the flower lei, either buying cheap nylon lei and using the 'petals' to cover furniture and lightboxes, or making lei from non-traditional materials, such as the nylon thread used in weedeaters, or the fish-shaped soy sauce bottles that come with take-away sushi packs, which 'carry on the tradition of Pacific adoption of modern materials like plastic in customary forms as well as commenting on the economic traditions of Pacific Island peoples in urban Aotearoa New Zealand'.

Karen Stevenson writes of Hastings-McFall's lei works:

Hastings-McFall finds much to parody in the contemporary lives of Pacific Islanders as they encounter the stereotypes of the Western gaze. Hastings-McFall's humour is the basis and inspiration for her Urban Lei Series. Using McDonald's throwaways (MacLei), curtain nets (Nosy Neighbour Lei), weedeater nylon (Islanders) and soy sauce containers (Too Much Sushi Lei), Hastings-McFall addresses the lived island and urban realities of New Zealand.

Along with artist Sofia Tekela-Smith, Hastings-McFall has also revisited the kapkap (a pendant form found in the Solomon Islands and the Marquesas), traditionally made from mother of pearl and tortoiseshell, but in Hastings-McFall's versions made from materials such a gold and computer disks, or mother of pearl and stainless steel.

== Exhibitions ==
Hastings-McFall has exhibited extensively since 1994 and has received support from Creative New Zealand to produce work. Major New Zealand exhibitions include In Flyte, a survey exhibition at Pataka Art + Museum, Porirua (2013), Home AKL at Auckland City Art Gallery (2012), Oceania: Imagining the Pacific at City Gallery Wellington (2011), and Bottled Ocean curated by Jim Viviaeare, which toured New Zealand in 1994-1995. Her work has also featured in international exhibitions including Niu Pasifik: Urban Art from the Pacific Rim, C.N. Gorman Museum at UC Davis, (2010); Pasifika Styles, University of Cambridge (2006); and Paradise Now?, Asia Society Museum, New York (2004).

In 2023, the Denver Art Museum invited Hastings-McFall to “create site-specific work in conversation with works from the DAM’s Arts of Oceania collection.” The exhibit, Islands Beyond Blue: Niki Hastings-McFall and Treasures from the Oceania Collection, marked the reopening of the Museum’s Oceania gallery.

=== 1 Noble Savage, 2 Dusky Maidens ===
In 1999 Hastings-McFall collaborated with jewellers Chris Charteris and Tekala-Smith on the exhibition 1 Noble Savage, 2 Dusky Maidens at Judith Anderson Gallery in Auckland, which helped draw attention to a new generation of New Zealand artists of Pacific descent and showed "what contemporary jewellers might offer to contemporary Pacific identity − notably a sense of playful appropriation of Pacific adornment that is ironic and serious at the same time".

The exhibition was accompanied by a publication titled 1 Noble Savage, 2 Dusky Maidens with reproductions of the three artists' work and essays by Mark Kirby, Lisa Taouma and Nicholas Thomas.The publication's catalogue featured a photograph of the three artists in a faux-ethnographic style, dressed in traditional manner and mimicking the conventions of photographs taken in Samoa in the 1890s for Western consumption, as a comment on stereotypical presentations of Pacific peoples.

=== Vahine Collective ===
Hastings-McFall has also worked collaboratively with artists Lily Laita and Lonnie Hutchinson as the 'Vahine Collective'. In 2002 the collective researched ancient rock platforms called tia seu lupe (pigeon snaring mounds) in Samoa, resulting in an exhibition titled Vahine. In 2012 the collective shared the Creative New Zealand and National University of Samoa Samoa Artist in Residence award, with each artist spending a month in Samoa to extend the research and work began a decade earlier.

== Collections ==
Hastings-McFall has work in the collections of Museum of New Zealand Te Papa Tongarewa, Auckland Art Gallery, The Dowse Art Museum, Queensland Gallery of Modern Art and the British Museum.

== Artwork ==
=== Sailors Delight ===
Being part Samoan and Pākehā Niki Hastings-McFall has incorporated cultural elements from both sides of her ethnicities through the use of Pacific forms in collaboration with urban/non-Pacific materials. Sailors Delight is a wall artwork that Niki Hastings-McFall has created using synthetic flowers/ lei with a set of subtle orange/pink/white led lights in the shape of a cloud to visualize the encounter sailors would have when approaching islands in the Pacific region . It is currently located at the University of Waikato where it is hung in a sheltered area of the University so that the subtle glow of the cloud is incredibly illuminable. Hastings-McFall's relationship to this piece was expressed through her research of colonization in the Pacific region and the effects Christianity had on the region also. Colonization in the Pacific region enforced religious beliefs to ban and disregard Pacific culture and tradition such as the use of the lei, for females in particular, as it was determined seductive by the Christian faith and too attractive to those of the opposite sex.

The purpose of Sailors Delight can be a form of reclamation for the Pacific region in reference to regaining their identity and the cultural significance of the use of this material - the lei again. The lei being a synthetic flower in this artwork, can represent the plastic or inauthentic elements as a symbol of Pacific culture and consequence of colonization in the region. As well as the orange/pink/white lights representing the attraction one has to the flowers, coincides with the Christian religion argument that the wearing of the lei was used only to seduce men, such as Western colonizers and sailors, and not of cultural significance. The colors chosen for the lights reflect also the night/morning sky and for some the saying " Red sky at night, shepherds delight. Red sky in the morning, shepherds warning" in this case substituting "shepherds" for "sailors", associating this relationship of sailors utilizing the sky as a way of navigation while entering the Pacific region.

Sailors Delight reveals the effects of the Pacific regions post-colonial issues around culture and identity through the use of materials both authentic and synthetic like lei and its colors. Niki Hastings-McFall's acknowledgment of how the lei has become a cultural stereotype for the Pacific region, alongside the idealism of the "dusky maiden" and the islands of the Pacific being a place of "paradise", demands the traditional significance and cultural status of the lei to be reclaimed once more for the Pacific. Much of her artwork is centered around the discussion of cultural identity, Pacific histories and colonial legacies.

== Further information ==
- "Interview with Niki Hastings-McFall". Standing Room Only, Radio New Zealand National. 2015.
- Deborah Crowe; The Dowse Art Museum, 4th New Zealand Jewellery Biennale: Grammar: Subjects and Objects, 2001
