= Hanoi Contemporary Arts Centre =

Contemporary art centre in Hanoi, Vietnam

The Contemporary Arts Centre is located in Hanoi, Vietnam that showcases modern Vietnamese art.

== Literature ==
- Lenzi, Iola (2004). Museums of Southeast Asia. Singapore: Archipelago Press. p. 200. ISBN 981-4068-96-9.
