= Ioane Ioane =

New Zealand artist

Ioane Ioane(born 1962 in Christchurch) is a New Zealand artist of Samoan descent. His work is informed by his Samoan heritage and includes performance, film, painting, installation and sculpture. Ioane's art often depicts the coexistence of contemporary New Zealand and traditional Samoan cultures.

In conversation about his work Fale Sā with art historian Caroline Vercoe, Ioane states, Sacred places are not necessarily a church, but it's a place where one likes to be in, a place of affirmation. Curator Ron Brownson writes, Ioane's attitude to sculptural process is cosmological – his carvings bind present reality with a representation of the past.

== Career ==
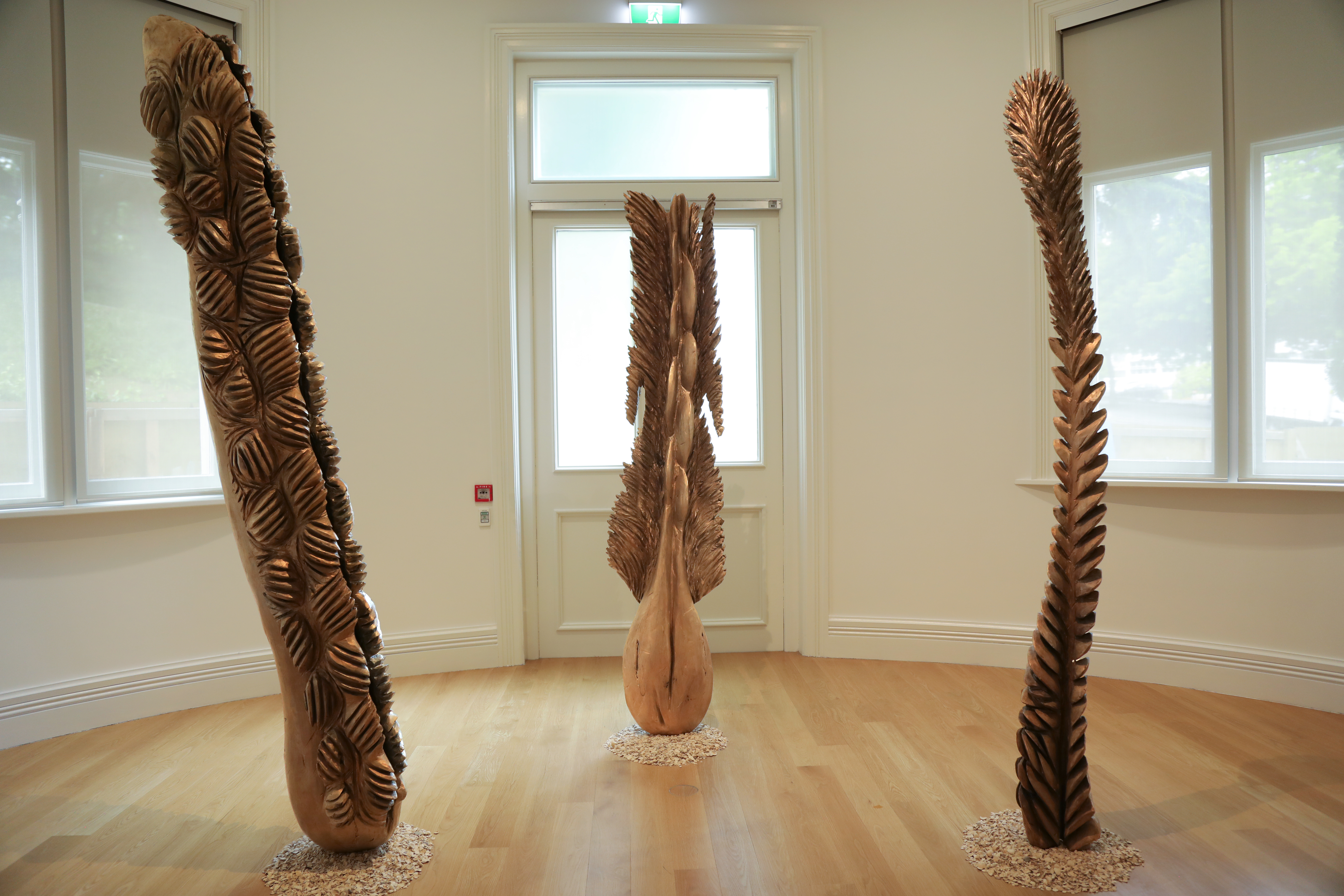
Fale Sā (1999), a sculpture by Ioane on display at the Auckland Art Gallery in 2025

Ioane was the finalist for the Saatchi and Saatchi Art Awards in 1996. In 2005 Ioane won the Creative New Zealand Pacific Innovation and Excellence Art Award. In 2009 Whangarei Art Museum presented the first major survey of Ioane’s work, John Ioane – Journeyman Artist and the Pacific Paradox: A 25 Year Selective Survey Exhibition, curated by Museum Director, Scott Pothan. In 2016, Ioane was the Artist in Residence at the University of Canterbury's Macmillan Brown Centre for Pacific Studies. In 2018, he was the Creative New Zealand Sāmoa Artist in Residence.

His work is held in both private and public collections, including the Auckland Art Gallery; the Museum of New Zealand Te Papa Tongarewa; University of Cambridge Museum of Archaeology and Anthropology, England; the National University of Samoa; the Tjibaou Cultural Centre, Nouméa, New Caledonia; the Wallace Arts Trust, Auckland; and the University of Auckland Art Collection.

== Education ==
In 1985 Ioane received a Bachelor of Fine Arts from the Elam School of Fine Arts at Auckland University. In 1986 he earned a diploma in teaching from the Auckland College of Education. In 1996 he received a post graduate diploma in fine arts from Elam.

== Selected exhibitions ==
- 2015 Te Wā Tōiri: Fluid Horizon Auckland Art Gallery Toi o Tāmaki
- 2013 Mannequin, Lopdell House Gallery
- 2012 Home AKL, Auckland Art Gallery
- 2012 I will sea you in Hawaiki Mangere Arts Centre, Nga Tohu O Uenuku
- 2012 Poly Wants a Cracker, City Gallery Wellington.
- 2009 John Ioane: journeyman artist and the Pacific paradox : a 25 year selective survey, Whangarei Art Museum.
- 2008 Samoan Contemporary, Pataka Art + Museum, Porirua.
- 2008 Te Tataitanga / Bind Together, Southwest School of Art & Craft, San Antonio, Texas, USA
- 2007 Le Folauga Auckland War Memorial Museum
- 2006 Pasifika Styles, Museum of Archaeology and Anthropology, University of Cambridge
- 2004 Paradise Now? Contemporary Art from the Pacific, Asia Society Museum, New York
- 2004 The Other Day in Paradise, The Den Karangahape Road, Auckland
- 2002 Pacific Notion, Whitespace Gallery Auckland
- 1999 Fale Sā Auckland Art Gallery.
- 1992 Bottled Ocean, Auckland Art Gallery
- 1990 Te Moemoea no Iotefa, Sarjeant Art Gallery, Whanganui.
- 1990 3 Polynesian Artists, McDougall Art Annex Christchurch
