= Filipe Tohi =

Tongan artist (born 1959)

Sopolemalama Filipe Tohi (born 23 August 1959, in Tonga) is a Tongan artist who has lived in New Zealand since 1978. He has exhibited in major exhibitions in New Zealand and abroad. Several major collections include his work. The 2010 Art and Asia Pacific Almanac describes him as "Tongan art's foremost ambassador".

== Exhibitions ==
- Te Moemoea no Iotefa, an exhibition of contemporary Pacific art at the Sarjeant Art Gallery in Wanganui in 1990
- Bottled Ocean an exhibition of work by New Zealand artists of Pacific Island descent shown at a number of metropolitan art galleries in New Zealand in 1994–1995.
- Genealogy of lines: Hohoko ē tohitohi at the Govett-Brewster in 2002.
- Tohi was an invited artist for Partage d’exotismes (sharing exoticisms) at the Biennale of Lyon, France, 2000.
- Date Line: zeitgenössische Kunst des Pazifik = contemporary art from the Pacific, Berlin, 2007.
- Fatuemaka mei falekafa: Sopolemalama Filipe Tohi.Survey part one at Mangere Arts Centre, 2011.
- Home AKL: Exhibition held at Auckland Art Gallery, 7 July to 22 October 2012.
- Tonga ʻi onopooni = Tonga contemporary, an exhibition of contemporary Tongan art curated by Nina Kinahoi Tonga, Pataka Art + Museum, Porirua, New Zealand, 2014.

== Major collections that hold his works ==
- Auckland Art Gallery
- Govett-Brewster Art Gallery
- Museum of New Zealand Te Papa Tongarewa,

== Awards, residencies and sculpture symposia ==
In 2004, Tohi was awarded the Cook Islands Artist's Residency by the Pacific Arts Committee of Creative New Zealand. Tohi used this residency to research tufunga lalava, the traditional Tongan system of using lashings in the construction of houses and canoes. In 2006, he was one of three artists in residence at the Sainsbury Centre for Visual Arts during the exhibition Pacific Encounters: Art and Divinity in Polynesia, 1760–1860 He received the Creative New Zealand Senior Pacific Artist Award at the 2009 Arts Pasifika Awards. In 2023, Tohi received an Arts Foundation of New Zealand Laureate Award.

Tohi has participated in stone sculpture symposia, including:

- the Stone Art Symposium in New Plymouth in 1996
- the Pacific Sculpture Symposium in Auckland in 1998
- the 2000 sculpture symposium in Palmerston North with invited artists from the Pacific rim.

== Lalava ==
Tohi's earlier sculptures were mainly in stone and wood. More recently he has achieved recognition for large contemporary sculptures in aluminium and steel that are inspired by lalava – the Tongan word for traditional coconut sennit lashing. This lashing or binding has been described as "the Pan-Pacific technology used on houses, canoes, and tools before the introduction of Western materials".

The technique of lalava is an art as well as a practical craft. Practitioners, for example, use different coloured cords to make intricate patterns. An example is in the Fale Pasifika at Auckland University for which Tohi did the lalava in 2004., In discussing this work, Tohi said that lalava is not only about binding, but is also an expression of language, and of connections with the past.

== Public sculptures ==
Tohi has a number of sculptures in public or semi-public places.

=== Ha’amonga mata’a Maui, 1996 ===
Museum of New Zealand Te Papa Tongarewa, Wellington, New Zealand.

This sculpture, made of andesite stone and 174 cm high, is placed in the exhibition Tangata o le Moana: the story of Pacific people in New Zealand.

Te Papa's label for this sculpture explains that it depicts the eye of the demigod Maui in a stone surround, and that the form is based on that of the ancient stone monuments found in Tonga. A loose translation of the title is "the vision of Maui". An example of a massive ancient Tongan stone monument is Ha'amonga 'a Maui.

=== Haupapa (Female), 1998 ===
Govett-Brewster Gallery, New Plymouth, New Zealand

=== Untitled, 2000, installed 2006 ===
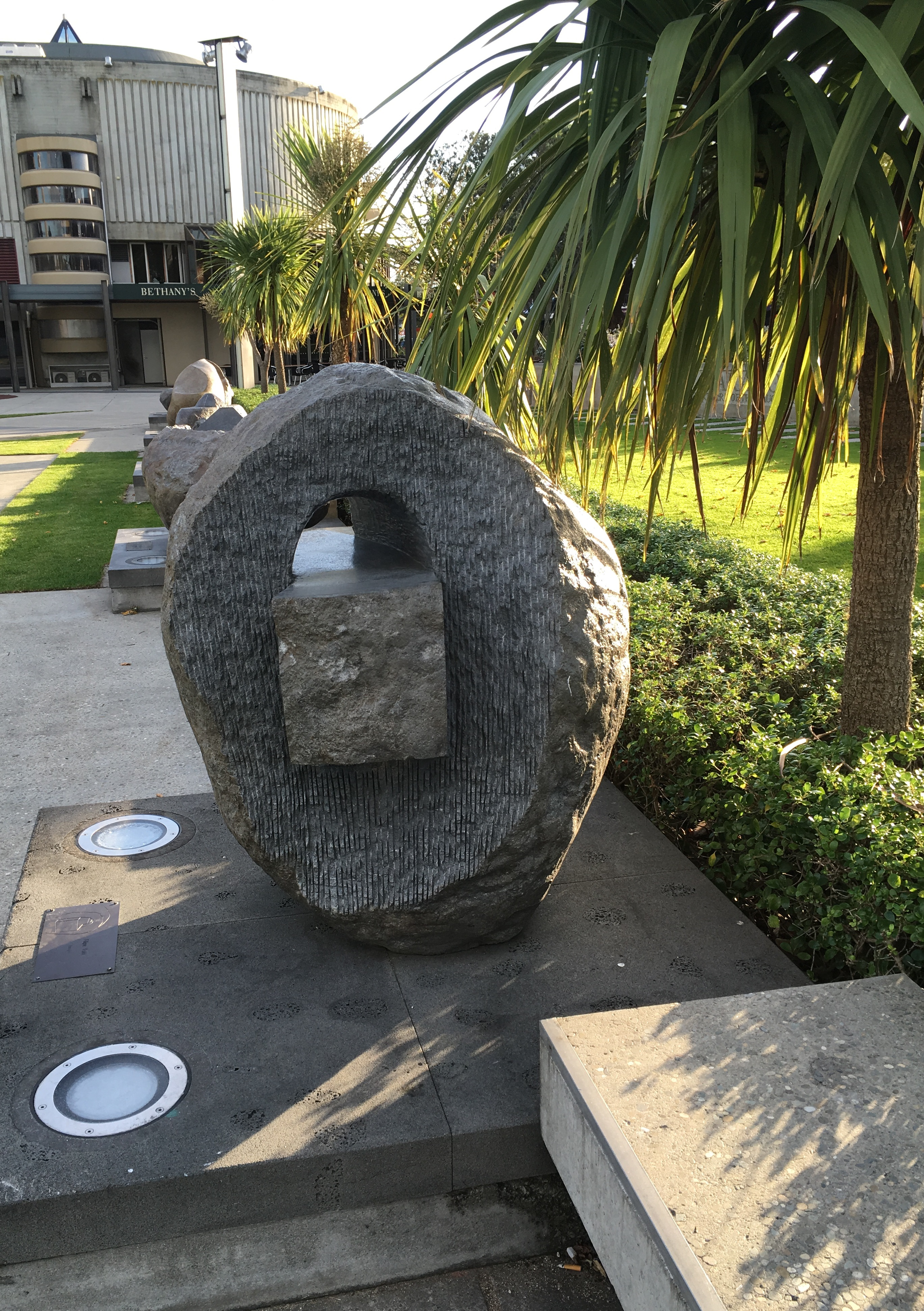
Untitled sculpture (2000, 2006) in The Square, Palmerston North

The Square, Palmerston North, New Zealand

This work is one of ten andesite sculptures carved as part of a project for the Pacific Rim Millennium Experience (PRiME).

=== Pacific Room, 2002 ===
Inside the New Zealand Parliament, the entrance to The Pacific Room is designed by Ian George, and the wooden carving was carved by four carvers from the South Pacific, Ian George from Cook Islands, Fatu Feu'u from Samoa, Filipe Tohi from Tonga, and Palalagi Manetoa from Niue, about how Pacific peoples from those islands came to New Zealand and made the new country home.

=== Halamoana (Ocean Pathway), 2003 ===
Corner of Brougham and Powderham Streets, New Plymouth.

This 14-metre-high (46 ft) aluminium sculpture was commissioned by New Plymouth architect Terry Boon, who also donated the land it stands on. Boon said that this work expressed the lalava philosophy and that in it Tohi was "decoding language and symbols from the Pacific". In the same article, Boon is quoted on the significance of the site: "Brougham street is historically important...; it runs down the slope to the spot on the foreshore where Maori and European settlers landed. The street terminates across the road from the Len Lye Wind Wand."

=== Hautaha (Coming Together), 2004 ===
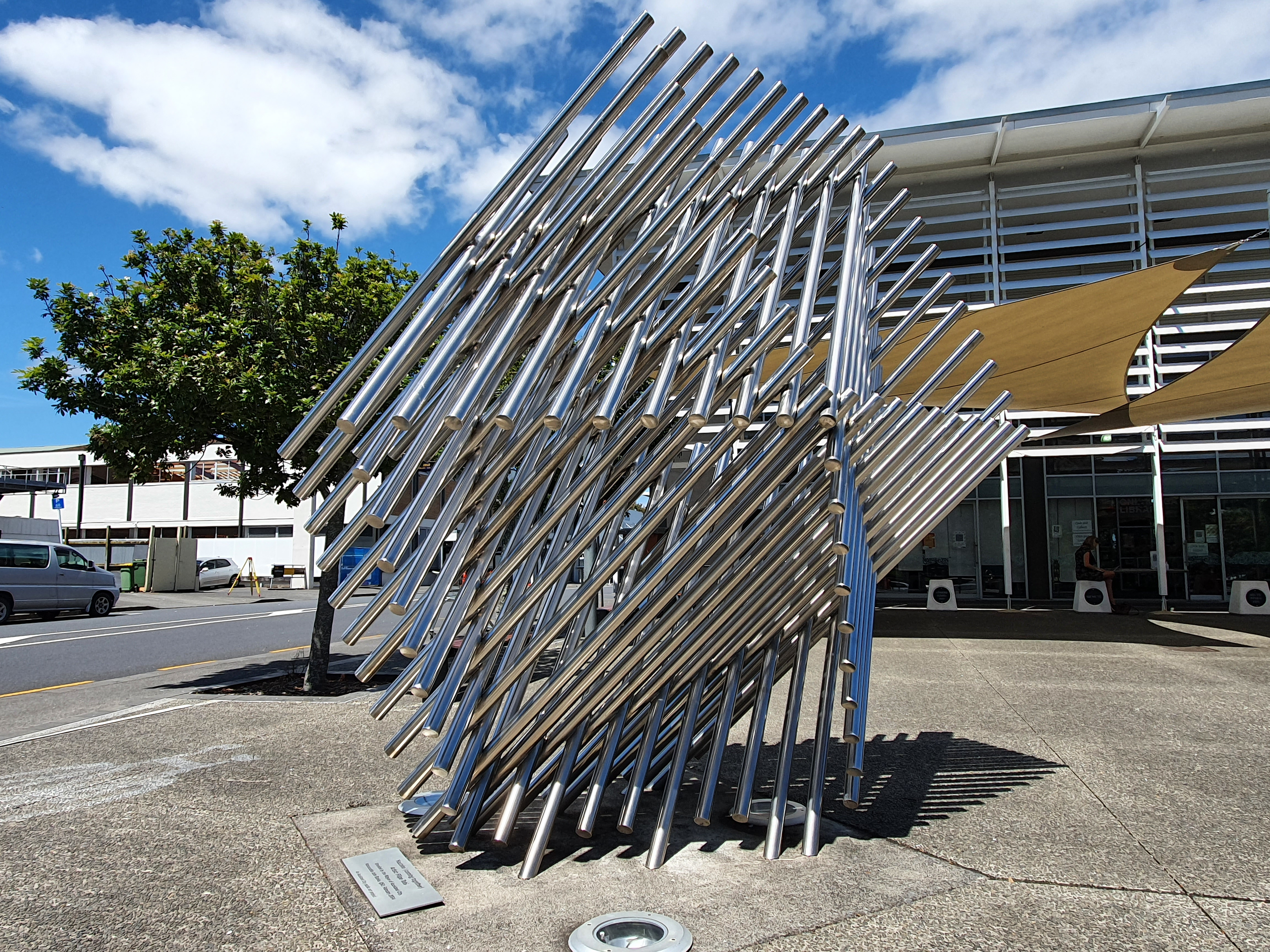
Hautaha outside the Onehunga Library in Auckland, New Zealand

Outside the Onehunga Library, Auckland.

This large sculpture made of stacked steel tubes is about the coming together of diverse groups, including early Maori, European colonists and more recent migrants from Pacific Islands. It also suggests the ropework on their boats. Tohi said that he "sees the form as female, embracing, welcoming and encompassing local residents and visitors to the community."

=== Matakimoana (Eye of the Ocean), 2007 ===
Museum of New Zealand Te Papa Tongarewa, Wellington, New Zealand.

This large aluminium sculpture is at the entrance to the exhibition Tangata o le Moana: the story of Pacific people in New Zealand.

In a film accompanying this sculpture, Tohi explains that it reflects the importance of lalava technology in Tonga. Before industrial technology became common in Tonga, lalava was used in making fale (buildings), fishhooks and other tools. In such uses, the cords are usually wrapped around cylindrical forms, such as the poles supporting a building. Tohi explains how he has brought out the patterns that were inside the wrapping, to make them visible.

=== Poutaha, 2014 ===
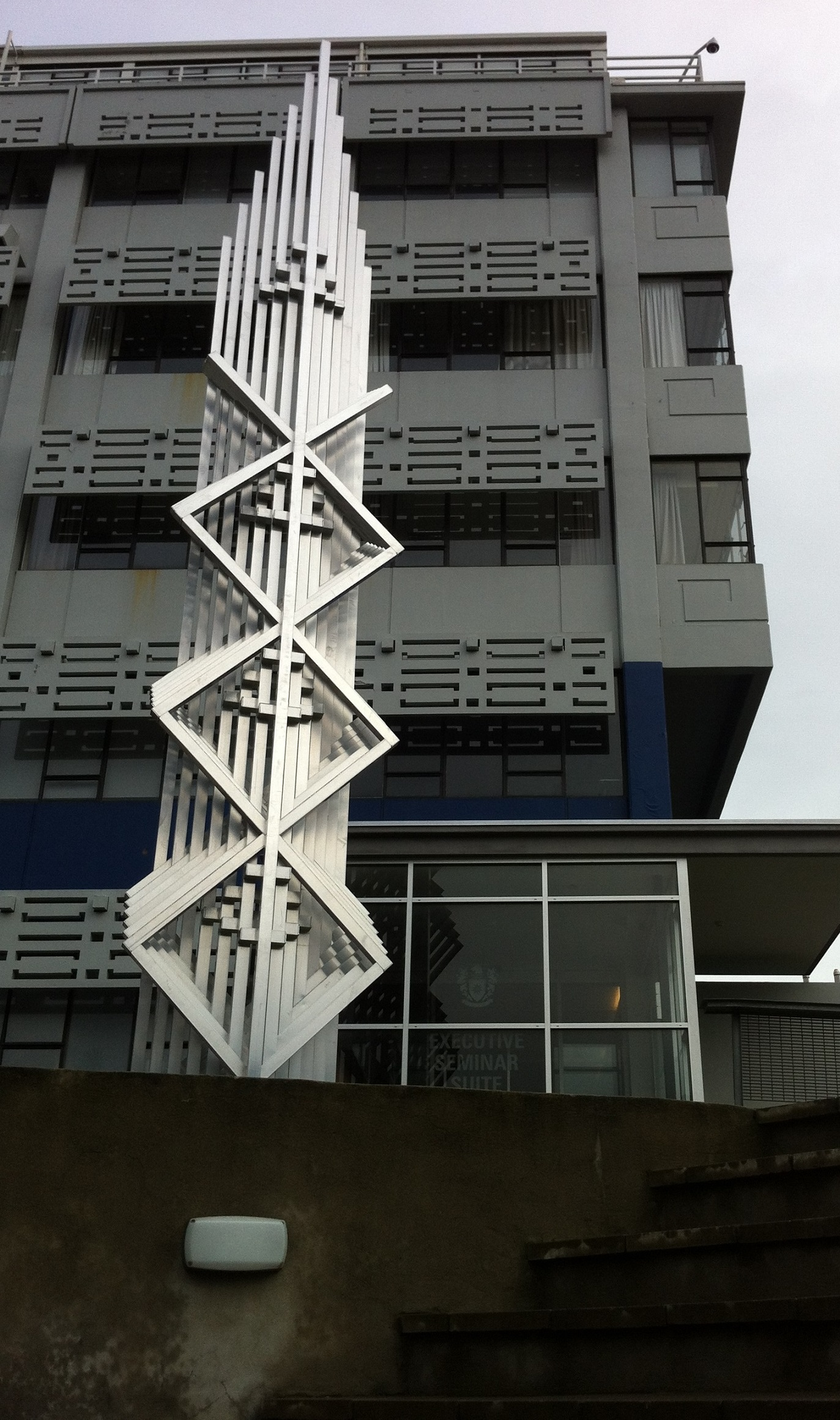
Poutaha, 2014, Massey University, Wellington

Welded Aluminium. Massey University, Wellington campus, near Entrance A.

Massey University's information pamphlet on this sculpture says that its title means "a marker, like those of a memorial or kumara god", and that ancient godsticks "marked boundaries when wrapped with rope". The pamphlet includes a diagram of several stages in the lashing of the lower, tapered cylinder part, of a god stick.

=== Vaka Folau (Canoes for the Journey), 2014 ===
Extruded aluminium, Victoria University of Wellington, Kelburn campus, library, second floor.

This large sculpture takes the form of a gateway into Wan Solwara, the Pasifika area of the Victoria University Library in Kelburn. Its wall label explains that it is based on three triangles, representing Melanesia, Micronesia and Polynesia. Small wave-like triangular forms represent the ocean that binds these cultural entities together. The upright sides of the gateway suggest two canoes.

=== Te Auaunga Awa – Multicultural Fāle and Outdoor Classroom, 2019 ===
Steel and wood, Walmsley Park, Mount Roskill, Auckland.

A functional meeting space based on a traditional fāle incorporating lalava forms, commissioned by Auckland Council. It won the Small Project Architecture category at the 2020 NZIA Auckland Architecture Awards.
