= Marti Friedlander =

British-New Zealand photographer

Marti Friedlander CNZM
- Self-portrait, c. 1984
- Born: Martha Gordon; 19 February 1928; London, England
- Died: 14 November 2016 (aged 88); Auckland, New Zealand
- Occupation: Photographer
- Spouse: Gerrard Friedlander (m. 1957)
- Website: www.martifriedlander.com

Martha Friedlander CNZM (née Gordon; 19 February 1928 – 14 November 2016) was a British-New Zealand photographer. She emigrated to New Zealand in 1958, where she was known for photographing and documenting New Zealand's people, places and events, and was considered one of the country's leading photographers.

Friedlander's work is held in the collections of Auckland Art Gallery Toi o Tāmaki and the Museum of New Zealand Te Papa Tongarewa.

== Early life, education and move to New Zealand ==
Friedlander was born on 19 February 1928 in the East End of London to Jewish immigrants from Kyiv, Ukraine. From the age of three she grew up in a Jewish orphanage in London with her sister Anne. She won a scholarship at the age of 14 and attended Camberwell School of Art, where she studied photography. From 1946 to 1957 she worked as an assistant to fashion photographers Douglas Glass, an expatriate New Zealander, and Gordon Crocker.

== Career ==
She married Gerrard Friedlander, a New Zealander of German Jewish origin, in 1957 and emigrated to New Zealand with him in 1958. She became a naturalised New Zealander in 1977.

Friedlander's first impressions of New Zealand were of a strange country with different land, people and social customs from her previous experience. She felt constrained by what she saw as New Zealand's conservatism compared to the lifestyle she had enjoyed in London, and she began taking photographs to document and understand the country and people around her. She was particularly interested in people and social movements, especially protests and activism – one of the first photographs she took in New Zealand was in Auckland in 1960, of people protesting the New Zealand rugby team's tour of South Africa. The photograph was later purchased by the BBC and used in a television series on rugby.

Initially, the couple lived in Te Atatū South, and Friedlander worked as a dental assistant in her husband's dental practice. She joined the Titirangi Camera Club, and was encouraged by photographers Olaf Petersen, Steve Rumsey and Des Dubbelt, editor of the magazine Playdate, to pursue photography as a career, which she began to do in 1964. In 1969, she photographed Prime Minister Norman Kirk. In 1972 her work became well known through her collaboration with social historian Michael King, photographing Maori women and their traditional moko tattoos. Friedlander considered this project the highlight of her career, and in 2010 she donated the series of 47 portraits to the national museum, Museum of New Zealand Te Papa Tongarewa. In 1979, Friedlander's photograph entitled United Women's Convention, Hamilton 1979 depicted Māori and Pacific women at the United Women's Convention at Waikato University, who were challenging the movement on their omission of Māori and Pacific issues.

Friedlander's photography career lasted over 40 years, during which time she photographed a diverse range of subjects, including famous and ordinary people, and rural and urban landscapes. Her work was published in books, magazines and newspapers such as Wine Review, New Zealand Listener and the British Journal of Photography. In 2001, a retrospective exhibition of 150 of her photographs from 1957 to 1986 was held at the Auckland Art Gallery, followed by a tour of New Zealand galleries. In 2004, she was the subject of a documentary by Shirley Horrocks entitled Marti: the Passionate Eye. In 2007, the Arts Foundation of New Zealand launched the Marti Friedlander Photographic Award, presented every two years to an experienced photographer. In 2013, Friedlander published an autobiography, Self-Portrait, written with oral historian Hugo Manson.

== Personal life ==
Friedlander was a member of the New Zealand Labour Party.

In October 2016, she revealed that she was suffering from late-stage breast cancer. She died at her home in Auckland on 14 November 2016 aged 88.

== Legacy ==
In 2018, Friedlander's photographic archive held at the E H McCormick Research Library of the Auckland Art Gallery was added to the UNESCO Memory of the World Aotearoa New Zealand Ngā Mahara o te Ao register.

== Publications ==
=== Photography ===
- Moko: Maori Tattooing in the 20th Century (1972) with Michael King
- Larks in a Paradise (1974) with James McNeish
- Contemporary New Zealand Painters A–M (1980) with Jim and Mary Barr
- Pioneers of New Zealand Wine (2002) with Dick Scott
- Marti Friedlander: Photographs (2001) with Ron Brownson
- Marti Friedlander with Leonard Bell (2009)
- Marti Friedlander: Portraits of the Artists. By Leonard Bell. Auckland University Press, 2021. ISBN 978-1869409173.

=== Writing ===
- Self-Portrait (2013) – with Hugo Manson, an autobiography

== Awards ==
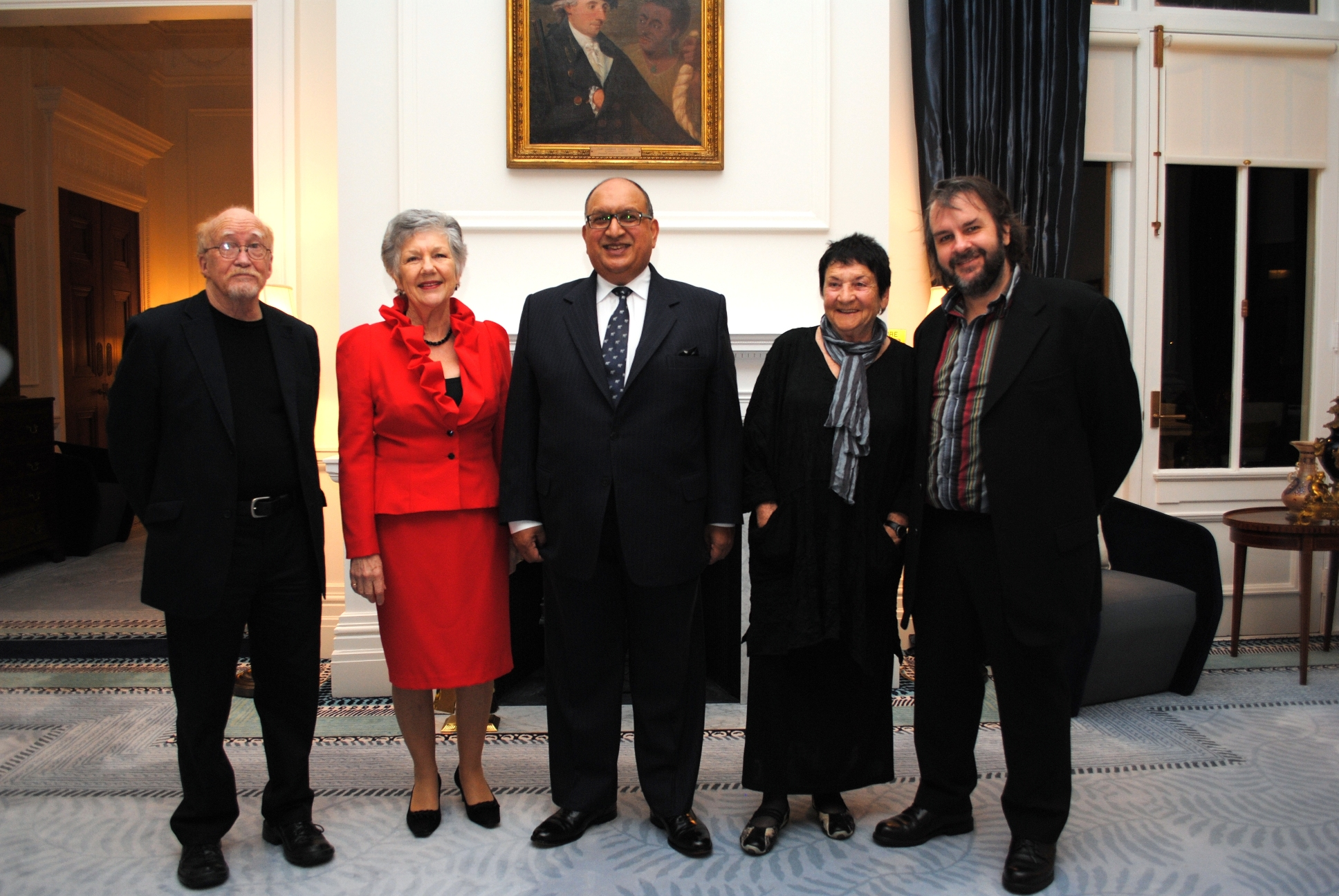
Friedlander (second from right), at Government House, Wellington, in 2011, with fellow Arts Foundation Icons Greer Twiss (left) and Peter Jackson (right), and the governor-general, Anand Satyanand (centre), and Susan, Lady Satyanand

- 1999: New Year Honours, appointed a Companion of the New Zealand Order of Merit, for services to photography
- 2001: Marti Friedlander: Photographs was shortlisted at the Montana Book Awards
- 2011: Arts Foundation of New Zealand Icon Award
- 2016: Honorary Doctorate of Literature by the University of Auckland

== Exhibitions ==
- The Photographers' Gallery, London
- Wynyard Tavern, Auckland (1966)
- Waikato Art Museum (1975)
- Auckland Art Gallery, 2001 and toured New Zealand galleries, 2002. A retrospective.
- Included in an exhibition of contemporary New Zealand photography for the Festival Internazionale di Roma, 2006, and subsequently shown at the Pingyao International Photography Festival in China
- Stark White Queenstown, 2024

== Collections ==
Friedlander's work is held in the following permanent collections:

- Auckland Art Gallery Toi o Tāmaki, Auckland, New Zealand: numerous prints
- Museum of New Zealand Te Papa Tongarewa, Wellington: 71 prints
