= John Pule =

Niuean artist and writer (born 1962)

John Pule ONZM
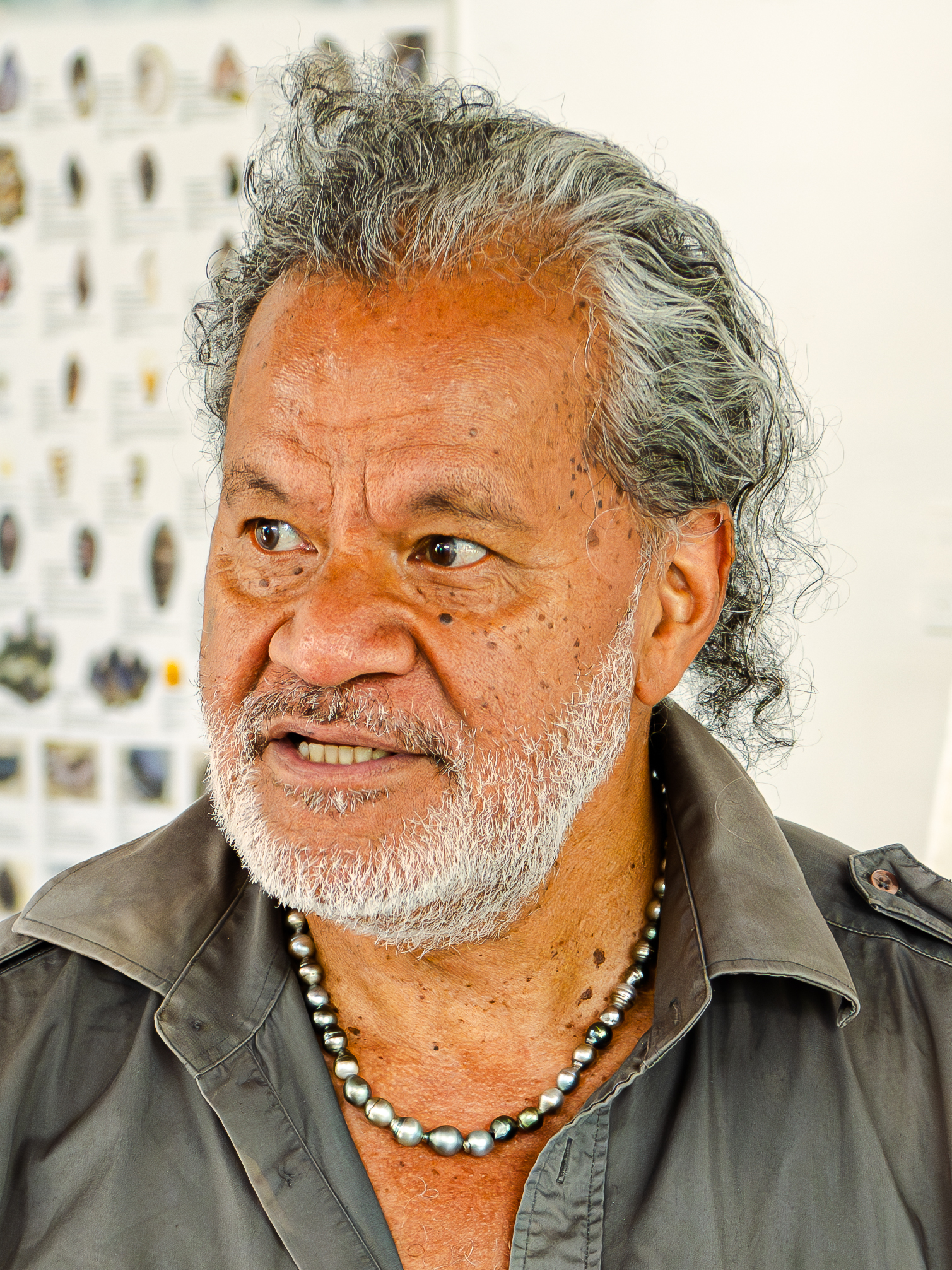
- Pule in 2024
- Born: John Puhiatau Pule; 18 April 1962 (age 64); Liku, Niue
- Citizenship: Niue, New Zealand
- Occupations: Artist, novelist and poet
- Awards: Art residency at Roemerapotheke, Basel, Switzerland (2004); Prestigious Laureate Award from the Arts Foundation of New Zealand (2004); Ursula Bethell Residency in Creative Writing at the University of Canterbury (2013)

John Puhiatau Pule ONZM (born 18 April 1962) is a Niuean artist, novelist and poet. The Queensland Art Gallery describes him as "one of the Pacific's most significant artists".

== Early life ==
Pule was born on 13 April 1962 in Liku, Niue, and arrived in New Zealand in 1964. He was educated at Mount Albert Grammar School in Auckland. After leaving school he spent time working on a dairy farm and in factories and doing labouring jobs.

== Literature ==
Describing the beginning of his literary career, Pule explained:

"I just wanted to write about growing up in New Zealand, and about being the youngest of 17 kids and about migration—but I wasn't sure how to organise ideas, so I just started writing."

He also described his writing as a means of "decolonizing his mind". His work expresses his experience as a Niuean in New Zealand:

"My heart and my thoughts were always on Niue. But here I was living in Aotearoa on someone else's land. Writing helped change me, painting helped change me. I went back to Niue as often as I could, and I'd weed and clear the graves for my family and friends' families. It's a way of saying I'm back. [...] We go back home [to Niue] with our Nikes and our jeans and we think we know things. But the local people just think we're stupid. They know where all the trees are and the pathways and where the mythologies and the stories live."

Pule's first novel, The Shark that Ate the Sun (Ko E Mago Ne Kai E La), was published in 1992. It relates some of his early life experiences and the immigrant experience. Burn My Head in Heaven (Tugi e ulu haaku he langi) followed in 2000, and Restless people (Tagata kapakiloi) in 2004.

His published poetry includes Sonnets to Van Gogh and Providence (1982), Flowers after the Sun (1984) and The Bond of Time: An Epic Love Poem (1985, 2nd ed. 1998, 3rd ed. 2014).

In 2000 Pule was the University of Auckland Literary Fellow and in 2002 took up a distinguished visiting writer's residency in the department of English at the University of Hawaiʻi. In 2005 he was awarded an art residency at Roemerapotheke, Basel, Switzerland and in 2004 he was honoured with the prestigious Laureate Award from the Arts Foundation of New Zealand. In the 2012 Queen's Birthday and Diamond Jubilee Honours, Pule was appointed an Officer of the New Zealand Order of Merit for services as an author, poet and painter. He was awarded the Ursula Bethell Residency in Creative Writing at the University of Canterbury in 2013.

Poetry by Pule was included in UPU, a curation of Pacific Island writers' work which was first presented at the Silo Theatre as part of the Auckland Arts Festival in March 2020. UPU was remounted as part of the Kia Mau Festival in Wellington in June 2021.

== Artwork ==
Pule's artwork includes painting, drawing, printmaking, film-making and performance. The topics of his work include Niuean cosmology and Christianity, as well as perspectives on migration and colonialism. His work comprises both painting on canvas and bark cloth painting, a traditional Polynesian artform.

Pule was a guest professor of creative writing at the University of Hawaiʻi in the spring of 2002. In 2005, he co-wrote Hiapo: Past and present in Niuean barkcloth, a study of a traditional Niuean artform, with Australian writer and anthropologist Nicholas Thomas.

Since 1991 Pule has exhibited extensively throughout New Zealand, Australia, Europe, the USA, the Pacific and Asia. From 1996 to present he has held solo exhibitions in New Zealand, and in Melbourne Australia at the Karen Woodbury Gallery. In 2005 he exhibited at the Galerie Romerapotheke in Zurich.

Pule's work has been represented in three Asia-Pacific Triennials at the Queensland Art Gallery, Brisbane (2006, 2002, 1996), and his painting Tukulagi tukumuitea (Forever and ever) (2005) was illustrated on the front cover of the 2006 exhibition catalogue. Other selected group exhibitions include Amanakiaga, Karen Woodbury Gallery, Melbourne (2007); Turbulence, the 3rd Auckland Triennial, Auckland Art Gallery Toi o Tamaki (2007); Paradise Now!, Asia Society Museum, New York (2004); South Pacific Arts Festival, Belau (2004), New Caledonia (2000), and Samoa (1996); Iki and thanks for all the Ika, Contemporary Arts Centre, Vilnius, Lithuania (2003); People Get Ready, Auckland Art Gallery Toi o Tamaki, (2000); Wake Naima, Creating Together, Tjibaou Cultural Centre, Nouméa (1998); Kwangju Biennale, Korea (1995); Johannesburg Biennale, South Africa (1995); Bottled Ocean, New Zealand touring exhibition (1994); Te Moemoea no Iotefa, curated by Rangihiroa Panaho for the Sarjeant Art Gallery in 1990.

Hauaga (Arrivals) was a show of Pule's art organised by City Gallery Wellington in 2010, which toured other galleries around New Zealand, including Gow Langsford Gallery in Auckland.

Burn My Head in Heaven is a set of ten drawings combining poetry from his novel of the same name and imagery to tell various stories about living as both a Niuean and New Zealander.

The Pulenoa Triptych highlights themes of colonisation and cultural identity. When asked about the painting Pule noted "I wanted to express concerns at the way countries like America and France test their nuclear powers and Star Wars programme using the ocean in our backyard as the site".

Pule's work is held in numerous public and private collections including the Queensland Art Gallery, Brisbane; National Gallery of Australia, Canberra; National Gallery of Victoria, Melbourne; Auckland Art Gallery Toi o Tamaki, Auckland; Museum of New Zealand Te Papa Tongarewa, Wellington; Chartwell Trust Collection, Auckland; Wellington High Court, Wellington; and the National Museum of Scotland, Scotland.
