= Foufili Halagigie =

Niuean artist (born 1936)

Foufili Halagigie (born 1936) is a Niuean artist in New Zealand, known for her woven handicrafts. She has been described as a "master weaver" and recognized for her work as part of the handicrafts group Falepipi he Mafola.

== Biography ==
Foufili Halagigie was born in 1936 in Tamakautoga, Niue. She later settled in Ōtāhuhu, a suburb of Auckland, New Zealand.

Since 1998, she has been a member of the Auckland-based handicrafts group Falepipi he Mafola. She has been described as "one of the best master weavers" of the group. Some of her work features the tia weaving technique, and she uses materials available in New Zealand such as raffia and kaniu (coconut leaf ribs).

In 2009, she was honored alongside the rest of Falepipi he Mafola when the group received a Pacific Heritage Art Award in the Arts Pasifika Awards. In 2012, a lili fakamanaia (wall hanging) made by Halagigie was commissioned for the exhibit Home AKL: Artists of Pacific Heritage in Auckland at the Auckland Art Gallery, and it was subsequently retained as part of the museum's collection.

Halagigie's son and her daughter, Mokahele Halagigie, are also weavers as part of Falepipi he Mafoa, and her daughter has worked to encourage the use of recycled plastic in Niuean weaving.
