= Ron Brownson =

New Zealand art curator (1952–2023)

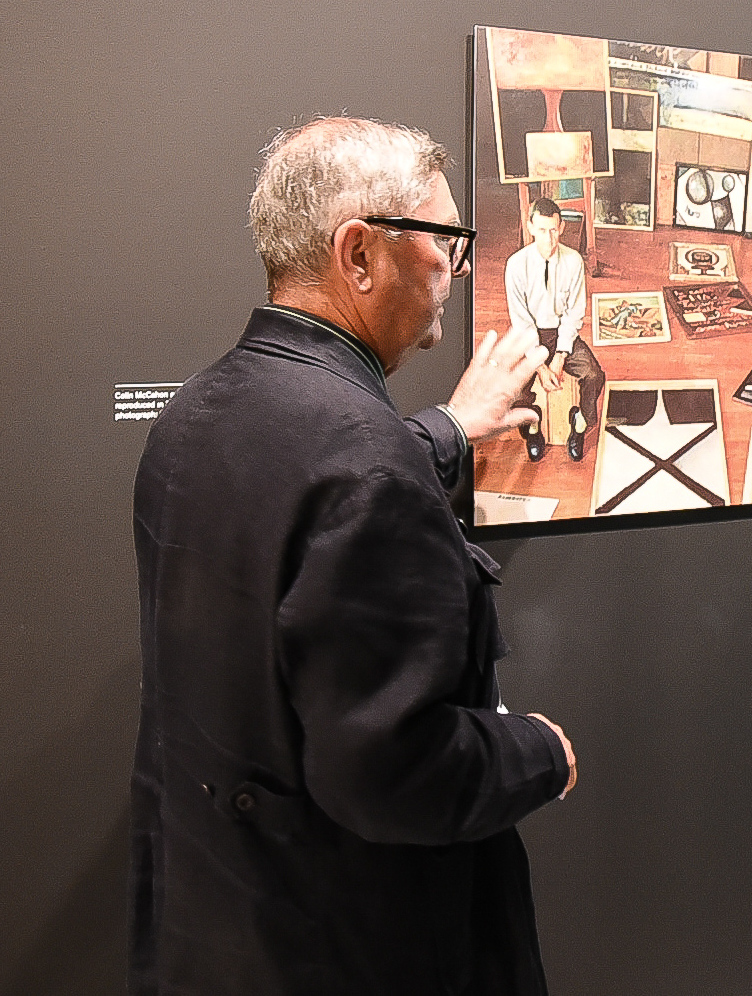
- Born: 1952; Syria
- Died: 27 February 2023 (aged 70–71); Auckland, New Zealand
- Other name: Ronald Brownson
- Education: University of Auckland
- Known for: New Zealand and Pacific Arts

Ron Brownson (1952–2023), also Ronald Brownson, was a prominent New Zealand curator who contributed significantly to Māori and Pacific art and culture in New Zealand. Brownson was the Senior Curator New Zealand and Pacific Art at the Auckland Art Gallery Toi o Tāmaki. Brownson also held status as a Queer elder and member of New Zealand's Gay Liberation Movement.

== Education ==
In 1977 Brownson received a master's degree from the University of Auckland. In 2006, the research papers from his master's thesis on New Zealand realist painter Rita Angus became part of Auckland Art Gallery Toi o Tāmaki's archives.

== Career ==
Brownson began his career at Auckland Art Gallery Toi o Tāmaki in 1978 as a research librarian at the EH McCormick Library. In 1995, Brownson became Curator of Photography and Pacific Art, in 2001 this role developed into Curator of New Zealand Art and Senior Curator in 2002. He held the position of Senior Curator New Zealand and Pacific Art at Auckland Art Gallery Toi o Tāmaki until his death in March 2023. Over his career he contributed to a number of pivotal exhibitions at Auckland Art Gallery Toi o Tāmaki.

In 1990, Brownson gave the first of many talks to come about New Zealand art and artists. He discussed the topic of Rita Angus for the Auckland Art Gallery Toi o Tāmaki exhibition, Two Centuries of New Zealand Landscape Art.

Dedicating over 40 years of service to the arts, Brownson held many lectures and artist talks over his career, with artists such as Fiona Clark, John Miller, Rueben Paterson. Brownson was known for advocating and supporting artists, most notably, Niuean artist John Pule and Samoan artist Fatu Feu'u.

In 2008, Brownson won the Illustrated non-fiction award at the Ockham New Zealand Book Awards for Bill Hammond: Jingle Jangle Morning, a book written in collaboration with Jennifer Hay, Chris Knox, and Laurence Aberhart.

Brownson was a former board member and trustee of Tautai Pacific Arts Trust from 2010 until 2023.

=== Publications ===
- Molly Macalister: A Memorial Exhibition (1982)
- John Kinder Photographs (1985)
- International Photography 1920–1980 (1985)

=== Contributions to Publications ===
- Andy Leleisi'uao: KAMOAN MINE (Bergman Gallery, TSB Wallace Arts Centre, Creative New Zealand, 2019)
- Andy Leleisi‘uao (Whitespace, 2009)
- John Ioane: Journeyman Artist and the Pacific Paradox (Whangarei Art Museum, 2009)
- Le Folauga: The Past Coming Forward – Contemporary Pacific Art from Aotearoa New Zealand (Kaohsiung Museum of Fine Arts, Taiwan, 2009)
- Fiona Clark: Living with AIDS, 1988 (Michael Lett, Auckland, 2018

== Death ==
Upon Brownson's death on 27 February 2023, there was an outpour of appreciation from his colleagues at Auckland Art Gallery as well as other galleries and artists he worked with over his career. Brownson's service to art and culture in New Zealand has proved him a significant figure in the G.L.A.M. sector both in New Zealand and internationally.

Long time colleague and friend Ben Bergman of Bergman Gallery said, "A legend has passed." and "Ron leaves an unprecedented legacy of service to New Zealand & Pacific Art." John Gow from Gow Langsford Gallery said "New Zealand has not only lost a great character of the art world but an enormous fountain of knowledge."

In 2025, his vast collection of 700 objects, split into three catalogues, was auctioned off in Cordy's auction house in Auckland. Brownson was a collector of New Zealand photographs, ceramics, rare textiles from Africa and Middle East, English furnitures, and art. According to interview with Hamish Coney on Radio New Zealand, many artists such as Marti Friedlander had given him artworks that Brownson had cherished. There are also about 5000 books in Brownson's collection.

== Exhibitions curated ==
Exhibition	Year	Location	Curator(s)
Open the Shutter: Auckland Photographers Now at Auckland Museum	1994	The Auckland War Memorial Museum, Tāmaki Paenga Hira	Ron Brownson (Guest curator)
Lillian. Budd: The Voice of Silence	1997	Auckland Art Gallery Toi o Tāmaki	Ron Brownson
Haze: Maureen Lander, Kaylyn Twotrees, Toi Mahi	1998	Auckland Art Gallery Toi o Tāmaki	Ron Brownson
Ross T. Smith: Hokianga	1998	Auckland Art Gallery Toi o Tāmaki	Ron Brownson
Terry Urbahn: The Karaokes	1998-99	Auckland Art Gallery Toi o Tāmaki	Ron Brownson
John Ioane: Fale Sa	1999	Auckland Art Gallery Toi o Tāmaki	Ron Brownson
Opo: The Hokianga Dolphin	2000	Auckland Art Gallery Toi o Tāmaki	Ron Brownson
New Visions: Beginning the Contemporary in New Zealand Art	2001-02	Auckland Art Gallery Toi o Tāmaki	Ron Brownson
Gretchen Albrecht: Illuminations	2002	Auckland Art Gallery Toi o Tāmaki	Ron Brownson
Sugimoto Portraits- Works Commissioned by Deutsche Guggenheim Berlin	2002	Auckland Art Gallery Toi o Tāmaki	Ron Brownson
Fatu Feu'u 'O le tautai Samoa	2002-03	Auckland Art Gallery Toi o Tāmaki	Ron Brownson
Colin McCahon: A Question of Faith	2003	Auckland Art Gallery Toi o Tāmaki	Ron Brownson
New Zealand Modern: Paintings and Sculpture from the Collection	2003-04	Auckland Art Gallery Toi o Tāmaki	Ron Brownson
India: Hindu Art from the 12th to the 18th Century	2003	Auckland Art Gallery Toi o Tāmaki	Ron Brownson
Bauhaus Photography	2003	Auckland Art Gallery Toi o Tāmaki	Ron Brownson
Self and Other: The Expressionist Spirit in New Zealand Art	2003-04	Auckland Art Gallery Toi o Tāmaki	Ron Brownson
John Kinder's New Zealand	2004	Auckland Art Gallery Toi o Tāmaki	Ron Brownson
Golden - Celebrating 50 Years of the Friends of the Gallery	2004	Auckland Art Gallery Toi o Tāmaki	Ron Brownson, assisted by Jane Davidson
Through the Eyes of Shirin Neshat	2004	Auckland Art Gallery Toi o Tāmaki	Ron Brownson
Doris Lusk: Arcade Awnings	2004	Auckland Art Gallery Toi o Tāmaki	Ron Brownson
Local Atlas: Contemporary New Zealand and Australian art	2004-05	Auckland Art Gallery Toi o Tāmaki	Ron Brownson
Te Moananui a Kiwa	2005-06	Auckland Art Gallery Toi o Tāmaki	Ron Brownson, Ngahiraka Mason, Jane Davidson
William Hodges 1744-1797: The Art of Exploration	2005	Auckland Art Gallery Toi o Tāmaki	Ron Brownson
Tribute: Visual artists celebrated by the Arts Foundation of New Zealand	2006	Auckland Art Gallery Toi o Tāmaki	Ron Brownson
Summer Daze	2006-07	Auckland Art Gallery Toi o Tāmaki	Ngahiraka Mason, Ron Brownson
Likeness & Character: Portraits From the Auckland Art Gallery Collection	2007-08	Auckland Art Gallery Toi o Tāmaki	Ron Brownson
The Walters Prize	2008	Auckland Art Gallery Toi o Tāmaki	Ron Brownson
In Shifting Light	2008-09	Auckland Art Gallery Toi o Tāmaki	Ron Brownson
Local Revolutionaries: Art & Change 1965–1986	2010-11	Auckland Art Gallery Toi o Tāmaki	Ron Brownson, Mary Kisler
The Walters Prize	2010	Auckland Art Gallery Toi o Tāmaki	Ron Brownson
Sopolemalama Filipe Tohi : Aotea (White Cloud)	2012-13	Auckland Art Gallery Toi o Tāmaki	Ron Brownson
Home AKL: Artists of Pacific Heritage in Auckland	2012	Auckland Art Gallery Toi o Tāmaki	Ron Brownson, Julia Waite
Partner Dance: Gifts from the Patrons of the Auckland Art Gallery	2012-13	Auckland Art Gallery Toi o Tāmaki	Ron Brownson, Natasha Conland and Ngahiraka Mason
Kinder's Presence	2013-14	Auckland Art Gallery Toi o Tāmaki	Ron Brownson
Robert Ellis: Turangawaewae | A Place to Stand	2014-15	Auckland Art Gallery Toi o Tāmaki	Ron Brownson
Toi Aotearoa	2011-14	Auckland Art Gallery Toi o Tāmaki	Ron Brownson, Natasha Conland, Ngahiraka Mason, Jane Davidson-Ladd
ANZAC: Photographs by Laurence Aberhart	2015	Auckland Art Gallery Toi o Tāmaki	Ron Brownson
Whano Kē: Change and Constancy in Māori Art Today	2015-16	Auckland Art Gallery Toi o Tāmaki	Ron Brownson
Te Wā Tōiri: Fluid Horizons	2015-16	Auckland Art Gallery Toi o Tāmaki	Ron Brownson
Seen from Elsewhere	2015-16	Auckland Art Gallery Toi o Tāmaki	Ron Brownson
Extra Ordinary Everyday	2015-16	Auckland Art Gallery Toi o Tāmaki	Ron Brownson
Yuki Kihara and John Pule	2015-16	Auckland Art Gallery Toi o Tāmaki	Ron Brownson
Len Casbolt's Photography: From Soft Focus to Sharp Vision	2016	Auckland Art Gallery Toi o Tāmaki	Ron Brownson
To All New Arrivals	2016-18	Auckland Art Gallery Toi o Tāmaki	Ron Brownson
The Māori Portraits: Gottfried Lindauer’s New Zealand – Te Hokinga Mai	2018-19	Auckland Art Gallery Toi o Tāmaki	Ron Brownson, Nigel Borell
Seeing Moana Oceania	2018-20	Auckland Art Gallery Toi o Tāmaki	Ron Brownson, Nigel Borell
Ralph Hotere: Godwit/Kuaka	2018-20	Auckland Art Gallery Toi o Tāmaki	Ron Brownson
Richard Lewer: Collective Memory	2020	Auckland Art Gallery Toi o Tāmaki	Ron Brownson
Civilization, Photography, Now	2020	Auckland Art Gallery Toi o Tāmaki and Touring	
Max Oettli: Visible Evidence, Photographs 1965–1975	2021-22	Auckland Art Gallery Toi o Tāmaki	Ron Brownson
Malcolm Ross, Fiona Clark, Grant Lingard: Looking at Men	2021-22	Auckland Art Gallery Toi o Tāmaki	Ron Brownson, Caroline McBride, Tamsyn Bayliss
