= Molima Molly Pihigia =

Niuean weaver and arts advocate

Molima Molly Pihigia QSM
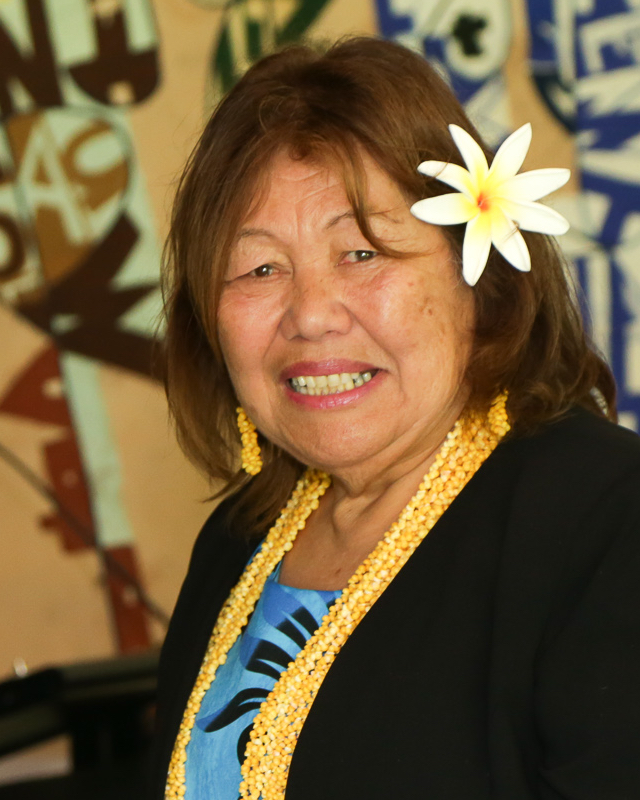
- Pihigia, 2020
- Born: 1950 or 1951 (age 74–75); Alofi, Niue
- Occupations: Weaver; arts advocate; healthcare worker
- Spouse: Fataiki Pihigia (died 2013)
- Children: 4

Molima Molly Pihigia QSM is a Niuean weaver, arts advocate and healthcare worker based in New Zealand. She founded Falepipi he Mafola, a Niuean handcraft group, in 1993.

== Life and career ==
Pihigia was born in Alofi, Niue, and moved to Wellington, New Zealand as a 19-year-old in February 1970. She moved to Auckland in 1990. She was married to Fataiki Pihigia until his death in 2013, and they had four children together.

She founded Falepipi he Mafola, a Niuean handcraft group for older people which promotes the art of weaving and Niuean culture and language, in April 1993. The group received the Pacific Heritage Arts Award at the 2009 Arts Pasifika Awards for "active community engagement with promotion of Niuean heritage arts". At the time, Pihigia explained that the regular meetings of the group had become "an avenue for us to develop, maintain and promote the Niuean handcraft skills in weaving, plaiting, netting, carving and most importantly language". The name of the group means "house of peace". The group published CDs of Niuean songs in 2005 and 2010.

Pihigia is an experienced weaver and uses recycled materials in her art. In 2016, 2017 and 2018 she hosted showcases at the Pasifika Festival. Her work is included in the Pacific culture collection at Te Papa. Since 2010 she has been a tutor and artist for Tupumaiaga A Niue Trust.

In addition to her art, Pihigia has worked in healthcare and mainly in aged care. She has worked as the project leader for TOA Pacific, an organisation supporting the care of elderly Pasifika people.

In the 2020 Queen's Birthday Honours, Pihigia was awarded the Queen's Service Medal, for services to Niuean art and the community.
