= Cathy Livermore =

New Zealand dancer and dance educator

Cathy Livermore is a New Zealand dancer and dance educator.

== Biography ==
Livermore grew up in Australia before returning to New Zealand to attend Unitec Institute of Technology's School of Performing and Screen Arts in Auckland. She graduated from the programme in 2002. Livermore has held academic positions in dance education at Whitireia New Zealand, the Pacific Institute of Performing Arts and The New Zealand Dance Company.

Livermore performed as part of Atamira Dance Collective. In 2019, she participated in Experimental Dance Week Aotearoa.

== Personal life ==
Livermore is of Waitaha, Kati Mamoe, Kāi Tahu, English, Irish and Scandinavian descent.
