= Lily Laita =

New Zealand artist

- Born: Lily Aitui Laita; 3 January 1969
- Died: 6 October 2023 (aged 54)
- Education: Elam School of Fine Arts
- Occupations: artist, art educator
- Known for: using Māori, English and Samoan texts in her paintings

Lily Aitui Laita (3 January 1969 – 6 October 2023) was an artist and art educator in New Zealand. Laita was of mixed Pākehā and Māori ancestry (Ngāti Raukawa), as well as of Samoan descent. Laita was known for using Māori, English and Samoan texts in her paintings.

== Education ==
Laita graduated with a Bachelor of Fine Arts from the Elam School of Fine Arts in 1990, and completed her master's in painting in 2002. She was the first Pacific woman to graduate from Elam. She taught at Wanganui Polytech and Western Springs College, Auckland.

== Work ==
Laita's work straddled the figurative and the abstract and she was well known for large-scale paintings on various supports, from stretched canvas to black building paper. In a 1992 interview she described moving paint on the surface of her work with her hands. Asked in the interview 'So do you fit into a tradition?' the artist replied:

Tradition is what you do today. I paint on black builder's paper and there's this 'Oh my God it's on builder's paper!' In my immediate family my father makes concerete tanks, my mother's an industrial machinist and my brother's a bricklayer.

Helen Kedgley and Bob Maysmor, the curators of the 2008 exhibition Samoacontemporary, described Laita’s work as ‘layered with feeling – many of her paintings explore intense personal experiences and family histories. Laita often embedded words and phrases in her paintings, hinting at veiled knowledge and withheld information; she deliberately avoided overt messages in her work.’

Karen Stevenson writes of Laita's work, 'Her artistic practice has to do with creating a visual language that reflects the complexity of the oral traditions of the past.' Stevenson adds, 'As one would slowly build images in the mind's eye, Laita creates images that reveal; but only after the viewer has truly looked. Language, people and images of cultural knowledge emerge from what appears to be an abstract canvas.'

=== Vahine Collective ===
Lily Laita worked collaboratively with artists Niki Hastings-McFall and Lonnie Hutchinson as the 'Vahine Collective', in 2002. In 2012 the group received the 2012 Creative New Zealand and the National University of Samoa Artist in Residence. They spent one month in Samoa and built on research they began for their exhibition Vahine in 2002 on ancient rock platforms called tia seu lupe (pigeon snaring mounds).

== Exhibitions ==
Laita had exhibited prolifically in New Zealand and internationally including Te Moemoea no Iotefa (1990/1991), Bottled Ocean (1993/1994) and Vahine (2003).

She had been part of major group exhibitions including the Samoa Contemporary touring exhibition which opened at the Pataka Museum and Gallery in Wellington 2008, followed by the Sarjeant Gallery, Wanganui and Tauranga Art Gallery in 2009. She was part of This is not a Vitrine, this is an Ocean at Waikato Museum Te Whare Taonga o Waikato in 2011.

In 2014, Laita's solo exhibition, Va I ta – Illumination, opened at Whitespace in Auckland.
