= Lonnie Hutchinson =

New Zealand artist

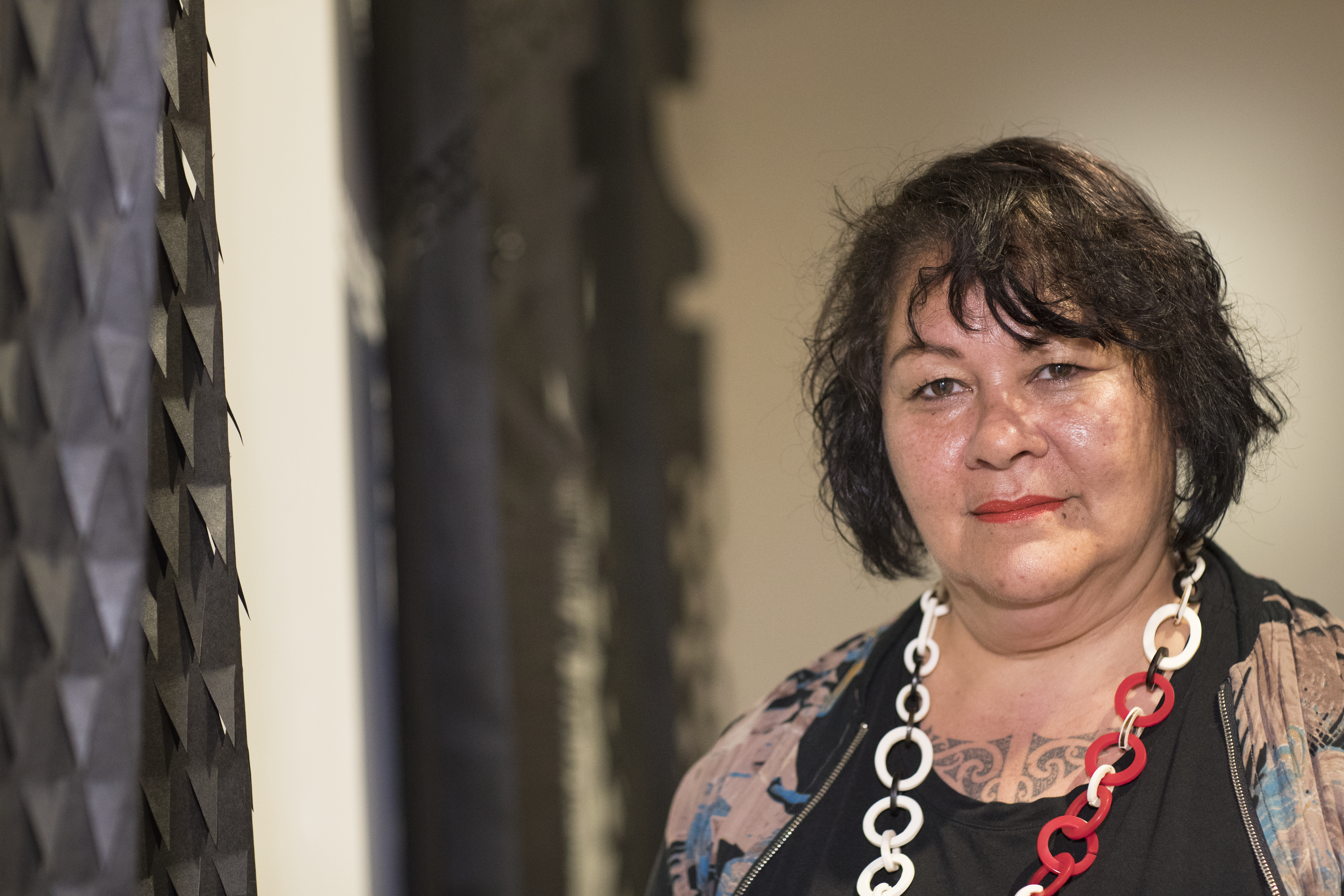
- Lonnie Hutchinson in 2018
- Born: 1963 (age 62–63); Auckland
- Notable work: sista7, Beat the Feet, Te Taumata

Lonnie Hutchinson (born Auckland 1963) is a New Zealand artist of Māori (Ngāi Tahu, Ngāti Kurī ki Ngāi Tahu), Samoan and European descent. In 2024 Hutchinson was awarded the My ART Visual Arts Award, making an Arts Foundation Laureate.

== Education ==
Hutchinson received a Diploma in Textile Printing from the Auckland Institute of Technology in 1992 and a Bachelor of Design (3D Design) from the Unitec Institute of Technology in 1998. She completed her Diploma of Education in 1999 and has worked as a teacher.

== Career and practice ==
Hutchinson has worked in a range of artistic media, including film, performance, painting, sculpture and installation art. She frequently draws upon feminism, historical narratives and her Māori and Pacific Island heritage to inform her work. Ultimately, according to curator Ane Tonga, her practice often creates "new methodologies that link colonial and ancestral accounts to inform and empower indigenous women in their urban existence.”

Hutchinson said of her work,

"Intrinsic to each series within my art practice, I honour tribal whakapapa or genealogy. In doing so, I move more freely between the genealogy of past, present and future to produce works that are linked to memories of recent and ancient past, that are tangible and intangible...I make works that talk about those spaces in-between, those spiritual spaces."

She is particularly recognised for her sculptural 'cut outs' made from black builders paper, such as sista7 (2003) in the collection of the Christchurch Art Gallery. Curator Ane Tonga noted that the recurring use of this material in Hutchinson's art practice works to address "a wide range of historical, social and representational constructs."

Lonnie Hutchinson is represented by The Central Art Gallery in Christchurch, New Zealand.

=== Public artworks ===
Hutchinson has also been commissioned to produce a number of public or long-term installation works. These include Beat the Feet, a site-specific work responding to the Christchurch Cathedral as part of Art and Industry's Biennial SCAPE 2008; Te Taumata, six site-specific works for the opening of the redeveloped Auckland Art Gallery in 2011; a digital binocular station that presents viewers with images of virtual landscapes in Chews Lane in central Wellington; I Like Your Form as part of The Arcades Project in the Festival of Transitional Architecture in Christchurch in 2014; and Star Mound, produced for the 2015 Sculpture on the Gulf exhibition.

In August 2015 Hutchinson's sculpture Night/I Love You was launched on a Ronwood Ave car park in Manukau, south Auckland. Three years in the making the work was commissioned through the Auckland City Council's regional public art programme. The work is made up of two phrases in neon lettering, 'I Love You' and 'Aroha atu Aroha mai', on adjacent walls of the carpark.

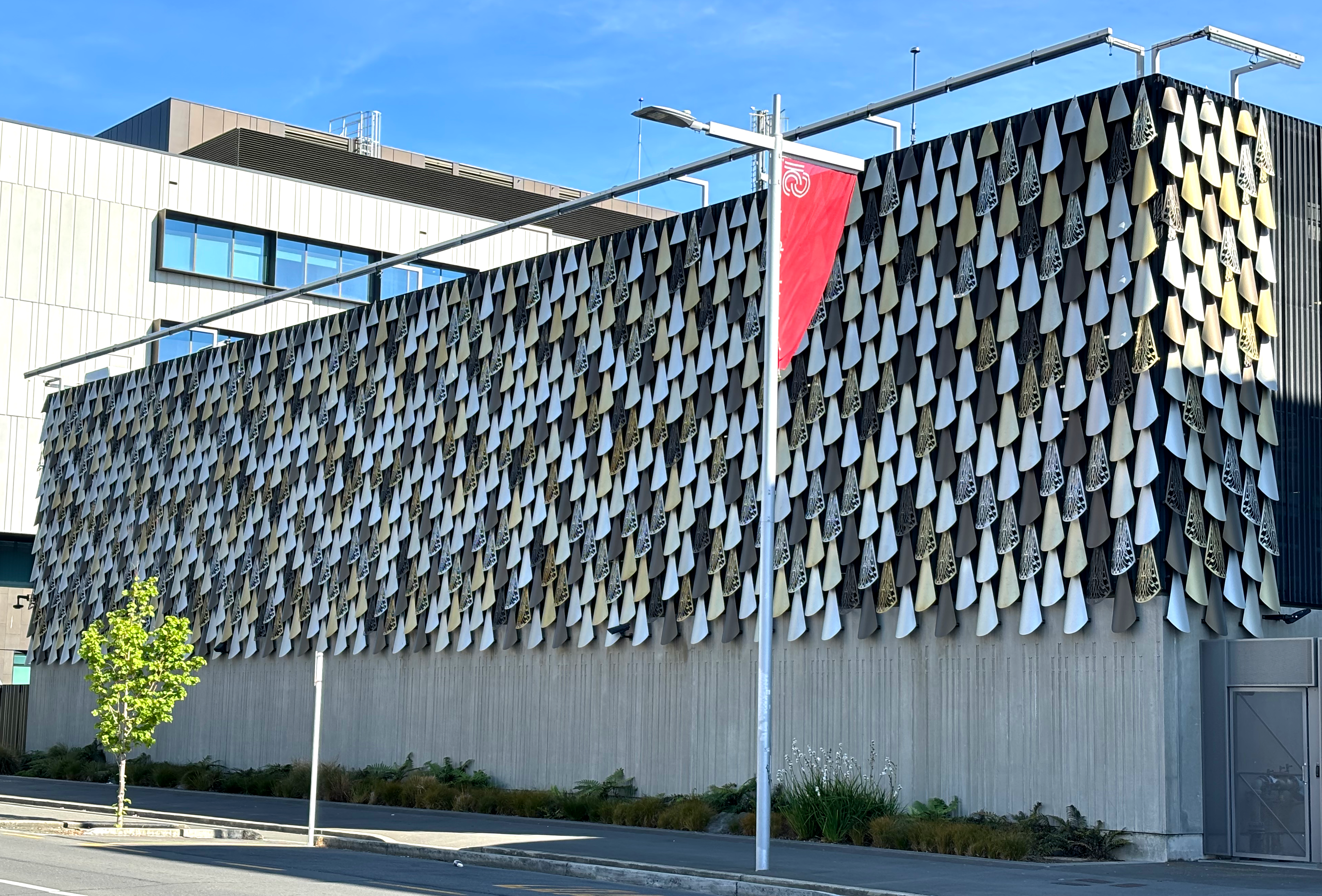
Tuam Street facade of Christchurch Justice and Emergency Services Precinct car park, by Hutchinson (2016)

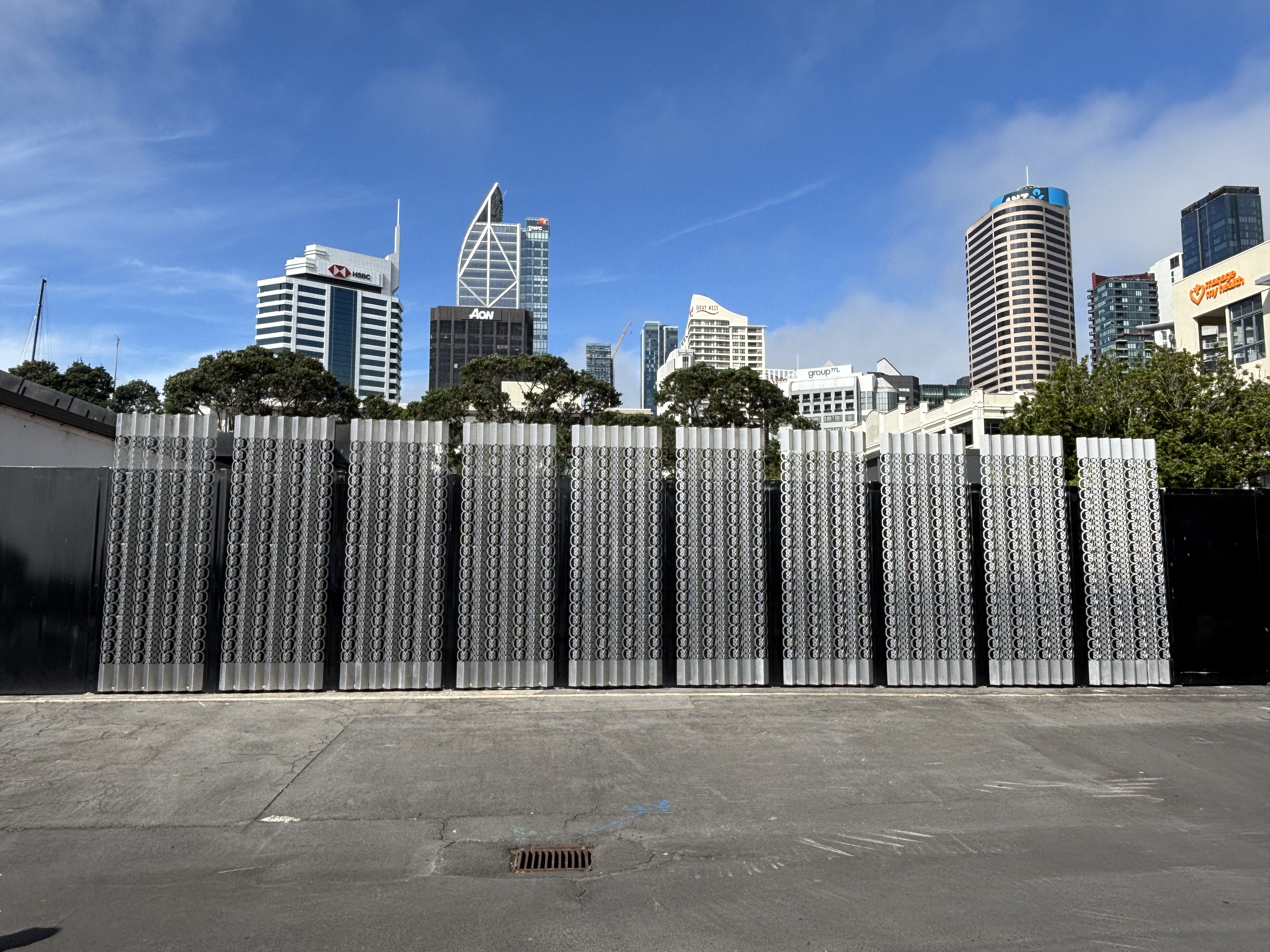
Moemoeā: A Model for Dreaming (2024) by Hutchinson, installed at Viaduct Harbour, Auckland, in 2025

In December 2016 the first stage of Hutchinson's commission for Christchurch's new justice precinct was unveiled. Made up of more than 1,400 individual curved, teardrop-shaped pieces of anodised aluminium, the 36-metre long work on the facade of a multi-storey carpark was inspired by Māori kākahu (woven cloaks) and the feathers of the endangered kākāpō. In developing the work Hutchinson studied a kākahu made with kākāpō feathers from the collection of the Perth Art Gallery in Scotland. Two other pieces of the commission – a huia feather design to be printed on windows and landscaping of the surrounding grounds – are still under development.

=== Collaborations ===
Hutchinson has also worked collaboratively with artists Lily Laita and Niki Hastings-McFall as the 'Vahine Collective'. In 2002 the collective researched ancient rock platforms called tia seu lupe (pigeon snaring mounds) in Samoa, resulting in an exhibition titled Vahine. In 2012 the collective shared the Creative New Zealand and National University of Samoa Samoa Artist in Residence award, with each artist spending a month in Samoa to extend the research and work began a decade earlier.

== Exhibitions ==
Hutchinson has been included in major group exhibitions including:

- Hiko! New Energies in Māori Art (1992) at the McDougall Art Annex (now Christchurch Art Gallery)
- Biennale d'art Contemporain de Noumea (2000) at the Tjibaou Cultural Centre, Nouméa
- Purangiaho: Seeing Clearly (2001) at the Auckland Art Gallery
- the first Art and Industry Biennale in 2002 in Christchurch
- Te Puāwai o Ngāi Tahu: Twelve Contemporary Ngāi Tahu Artists (2003) at the Christchurch Art Gallery
- The 2nd Auckland Triennial, PUBLIC/PRIVATE Tumatanui/Tumataiti (2004) at the Auckland Art Gallery
- Unnerved: The New Zealand Project (2010) at the Queensland Art Gallery, Brisbane
- Home AKL (2012) at the Auckland Art Gallery
- Ata Wairere (2015) for the re-opening of Christchurch Art Gallery following the five-year closure due to earthquake damage

Hutchinson has also had numerous solo and collaborative exhibitions, including:

- The Loni and Roni Show (2003) with Veronica Vaevae at The Physics Room, Christchurch
- Steel Paper Acrylic (2010) at the Snowwhite Gallery at Unitec in Auckland.
- Black Bird: Lonnie Hutchinson 1997 – 2013, a retrospective of Hutchinson's work, opened at the Gus Fisher Gallery in Auckland in March 2015 and toured to The Dowse Art Museum in Lower Hutt in August – November 2015.
- Light My Fire, RAMP Gallery, Hamilton, 2016

== Collections ==
Hutchinson's works are held in many public collections including the Auckland Art Gallery, Christchurch Art Gallery, the Hocken Collections, the Dowse Art Museum, the Museum of New Zealand Te Papa Tongarewa, the Queensland Art Gallery and the National Gallery of Australia.

== Reviews ==
- Peter Dornauf, Lonnie Hutchinson in Waikato, EyeContact, 24 August 2016
- Howard Davis, 'Black Bird': Lonnie Hutchinson at the Dowse, Scoop, 9 November 2015
- Mark Amery, Show me your motion, The Big Idea, 26 August 2015
- Natasha Matila-Smith, Review of Lonnie Hutchinson: Black Bird, EyeContact, 5 May 2015
- Gina Irish, Collaborating with Spirit SCAPE: from a different angle, Art New Zealand, no 115, Winter 2005
- Gina Irish, Exhibitions, Christchurch, Art New Zealand, no 108, Spring 2003
- Gina Irish, 'Te Puāwai o Ngāi Tahu: Twelve Contemporary Ngāi Tahu Artists', Art New Zealand, Spring 108, 2003

== Awards and residencies ==
- 2000 Macmillan Brown Centre for Pacific Studies residency at the University of Canterbury, New Zealand
- 2003 International Indigenous Art residency at the Banff Art Centre (first person to be awarded this residency)
- 2015 Contemporary Pacific Artist Award, Creative New Zealand Arts Pasifika Awards
- 2024 Arts Foundation Laureate, receiving the My ART Visual Arts Award

== Further information ==
- Rau Hosking, Bringing the Soul, Bulletin, no. 188, Christchurch Art Gallery, 2017
- Cassandra Fusco, Recovering Historical Silences, World Sculpture News, Autumn 2015, pp. 40–44.
- Interview with Lonnie Hutchinson, The Dowse Art Museum podcast, September 2015
- Ane Tonga 'An Upward Flight: The art of Lonnie Hutchinson', Art New Zealand, no. 154, Winter 2015, pp. 68–71
- Review of Black Bird: Lonnie Hutchinson 1997 – 2014 on Radio New Zealand National, 16 March 2015
- Hiko! New Energies in Maori Art, Christchurch Art Gallery, 2003 (digitised exhibition publication)
- Video about public art work I Like Your Form (Christchurch, 2014)
- Melissa Chiu et al., Paradise Now? : Contemporary Art from the Pacific (2004), Auckland: David Bateman in association with Asia Society, ISBN 1869535847
- Artist's website
