= Kolokesa Māhina-Tuai =

Author and curator in New Zealand

Kolokesa Māhina-Tuai MNZM
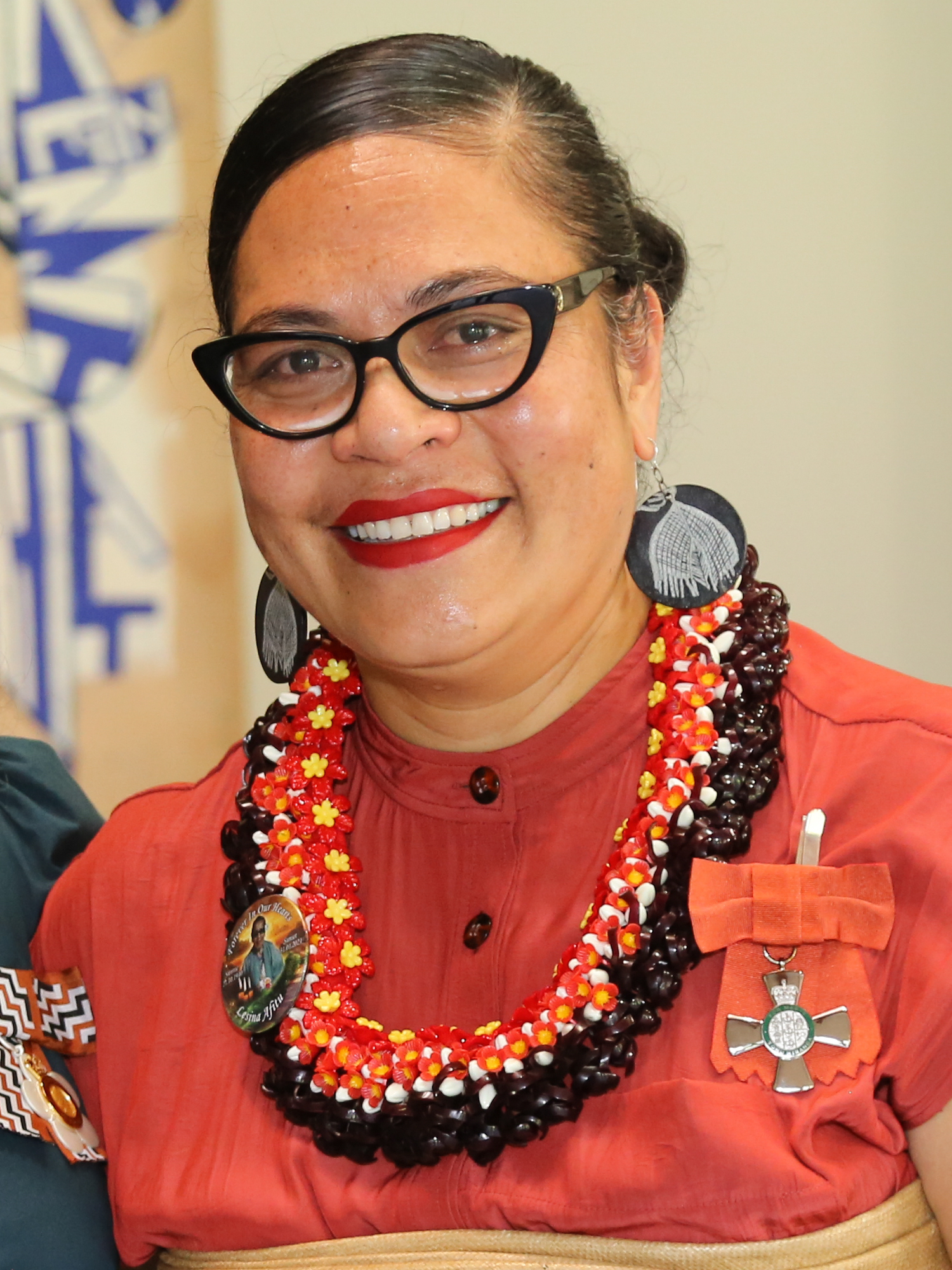
- Māhina-Tuai in 2022
- Occupations: Curator; writer

Kolokesa Uafā Māhina-Tuai MNZM is a Tongan curator and writer, whose work explores the role of craft in Tongan society. In the 2022 New Year Honours, Māhina-Tuai was appointed a Member of the New Zealand Order of Merit, for services to cultures and the arts.

== Career ==
Māhina-Tuai's research focuses on the history of Tongan crafts, in particular textiles, and her research is based on the primary importance of Tongan indigenous knowledge. She is of Tongan heritage, from the villages of Tatakamotonga, and Tefisi in Vava'u. She was Curator of Pacific Cultures at Te Papa Tongarewa from 2004 to 2008. She also worked at Tāmaki Paenga Hira Auckland War Memorial Museum and for the Vavaʻu Academy for Critical Inquiry and Research. Part of her curatorial practice at the museum was to encourage the museum to change to be more welcoming to Pacific people. She also worked as an associate curator on Auckland Art Gallery Toi o Tāmaki's "Home AKL: Artists of Pacific Heritage in Auckland” exhibition, which featured Joana Monolagi, amongst others. From 2010 to 2011 she curated the exhibition Nimamea’a: The fine arts of Tongan embroidery and crochet, which aimed to give prominence to the role that crochet in particular has in Tongan artistry. In 2011 she was a member of Falehanga 'i Teleiloa, and project managed the production of a 22-metre ngatu tāʻuli, or black-marked barkcloth, which was commissioned by Queensland Art Gallery. The cloth took 600 hours to make. She was also a member of the Pacific Arts Committee for Creative New Zealand from 2011 to 2014.

In 2016 she won the Special Recognition Award at the annual Arts Pasifika Awards.

In 2017 a project began to explore the possibility of reopening the Tonga National Museum. Alongside the then Minister of Tourism, Semisi Sika, Māhina-Tuai and sculptors Tui’one Pulotu & Steven Fehoko, supported the movement. In 2018 she showed open support for a continuation of the 'white sheet ceremony' where women who marry display a white sheet with blood on it, demonstrating that they were a virgin. In 2020 she co-curated Ā Mua: New Lineages of Making, an exhibition at The Dowse on contemporary Pacific art and craft.

== Reception ==
In Tangata o le Moana: New Zealand and the People of the Pacific, which Māhina-Tua co-edited with Sean Mallon and Damon Selesa, was described as "a vehicle that contains invaluable images, histories, memories, artefacts and knowledge for future generations, in particular Pacific peoples" by Michelle Schaaf.

In the 2022 New Year Honours, Māhina-Tuai was appointed a Member of the New Zealand Order of Merit, for services to cultures and the arts.

== Selected works ==
- Sean Mallon, Kolokesa Mahina-Tuai and Damon Salesa (eds): Tangata o le Moana: New Zealand and the People of the Pacific. Wellington: Te Papa Press (2012).
- Damian Skinner, Karl Chitham, Kolokesa Uafā Māhina-Tuai (eds): Crafting Aotearoa: A Cultural History of Making in New Zealand and the Wider Moana Oceania. Wellington: Te Papa Press (2019).
- Malama Papau, Kolokesa Uafā Māhina-Tuai, Lopiani Papau & Violeta Papau: Kolose, the Art of Tuvalu Crochet. Mangere Arts Centre (2014).
- Kolokesa Uafā Māhina-Tuai & Manuēsina 'Ofa-Ki-Hautolo Māhina Fujimoto: Nimamea'a: The Fine Arts of Tongan Embroidery and Crochet. Objectspace (2011).
- Okusitino Māhina & Kolokesa Uafā Māhina-Tuai: Aati 'o e lea Tonga heliaki. Tedts (2007) [in Tongan].
