= Māngere Arts Centre - Ngā Tohu o Uenuku =

Theatre and gallery space in Auckland, New Zealand

Mangere Arts Centre - Ngā Tohu o Uenuku
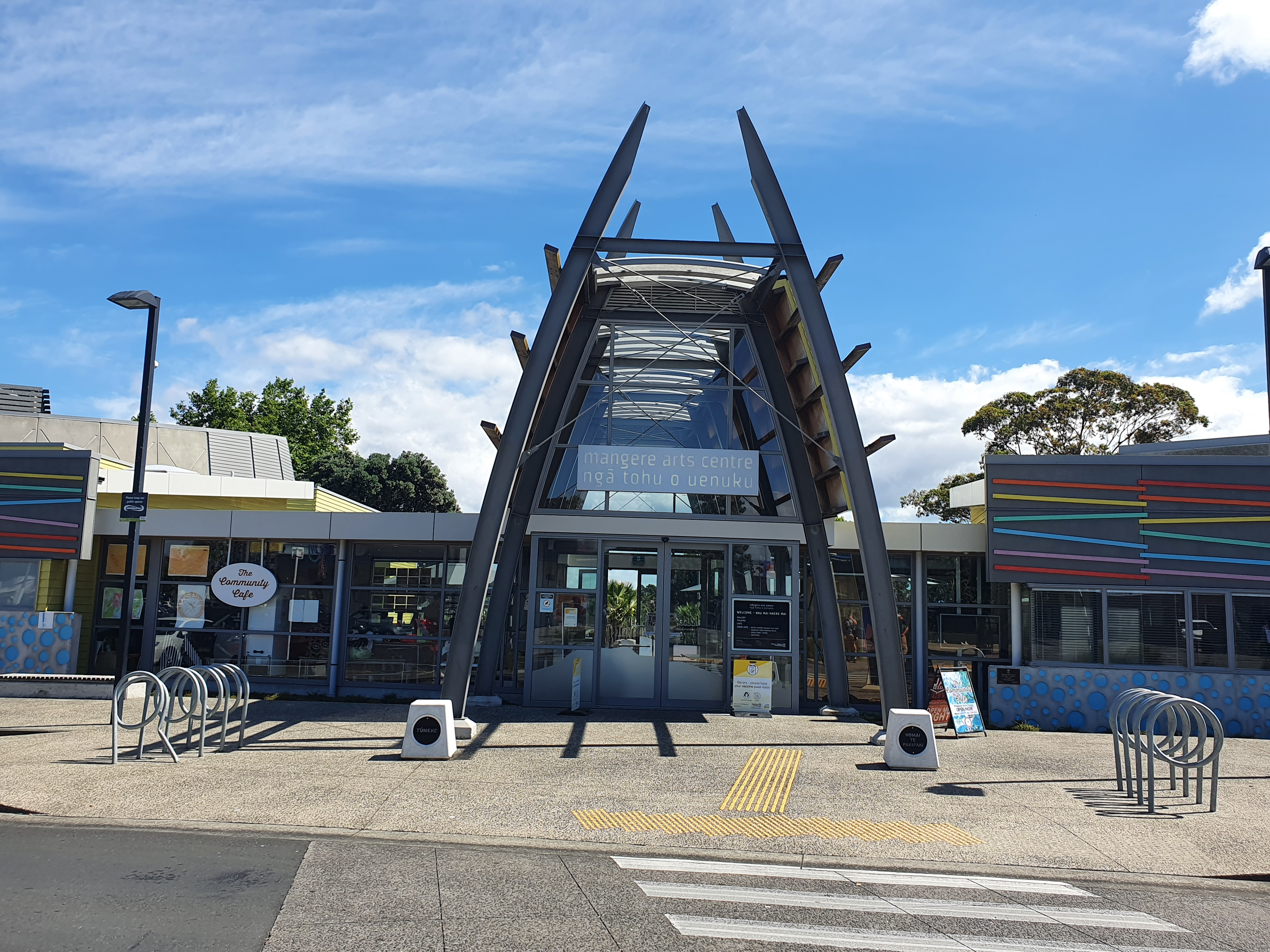
- Interactive map of Mangere Arts Centre - Ngā Tohu o Uenuku
- Location: Corner Bader Drive and Orly Avenue, Māngere
- Coordinates: 36.96899141346311°S 174.79849631728436°E
- Owner: Auckland Council

Website
- www.aucklandcouncil.govt.nz/en/arts-culture-heritage/arts/art-centres-galleries-theatres/mangere-arts-centre.html

Māngere Arts Centre - Ngā Tohu o Uenuku is an Auckland Council-owned and operated arts venue in the suburb of Māngere, in Auckland, New Zealand. The purpose-built facility was opened in 2010, and is considered by Auckland Council to be the home of Māori and Pacific visual art and performing arts in Auckland.

== Facility ==
The centre was purpose-built, and opened in September 2010 by Manukau City Council. It is now both owned and operated by Auckland Council. The venue includes two gallery spaces, totalling 217m^{2}, and a 230-seat theatre. In addition to the 390m^{2} performance space, there are a 56m^{2} studio space, three dressing rooms and a Green Room. An enclosed courtyard is used for outside performances. The facility also has a community kitchen and a cafe. Attendance in 2018 and 2019 was more than 36,000 people annually.

Since 2013, Alison Quigan has been the Performing Arts Manager at the centre.

In 2026, there was a free woodcarving workshop programme to allow first time artists a chance to exhibit in Māngere Arts Centre.

== Programme ==
The theatre produces an annual school holiday production in the April school holidays.

== Selected productions ==
- Kila Kokonut Krew, Taro King by Vela Manusaute (2012), celebrating the tenth anniversary of the Kila Kokonut Krew.
- Mirror Mirror directed by Troy Tuua and produced by Mangere Arts Centre (2017). The production won an Excellence Award for Overall Production at the 2017 Annual Auckland Theatre Awards.
- Moana (June 2019) Pacific Dance Festival, choreographed by Ankaramy Fepuleai, Manoa Teaiwa, Tofifailauga Misa, Lyncia Muller and the New Zealand School of Dance.

== Selected exhibitions ==
- Sopolemalama Filipe Tohi: Fatuemaka mei falekafa: Sopolemalama Filipe Tohi.Survey part one (2011).
- Pacific Sisters: Pacific Sisters SOUTHSIDE: EyeKonik, as part of the 2011 Pacific Arts Summit.
- Ioane Ioane: I will sea you in Hawaiki (2012)
- Chris Charteris and Jeff Smith: Tungaru; The Kiribati Project (2014).
- Malama Papau, Kolokesa Uafā Māhina-Tuai, Lopiani Papau & Violeta Papau: Kolose, the Art of Tuvalu Crochet. (2014).
- Charlotte Graham, Kaitiaki. (2015).
- Gavin Hipkins, Erewhon. (2015).
- Bethany Edmunds, Te Kōpū, (2018).
