= John Key =

Prime Minister of New Zealand from 2008 to 2016

The Right Honourable Sir John Key GNZM AC
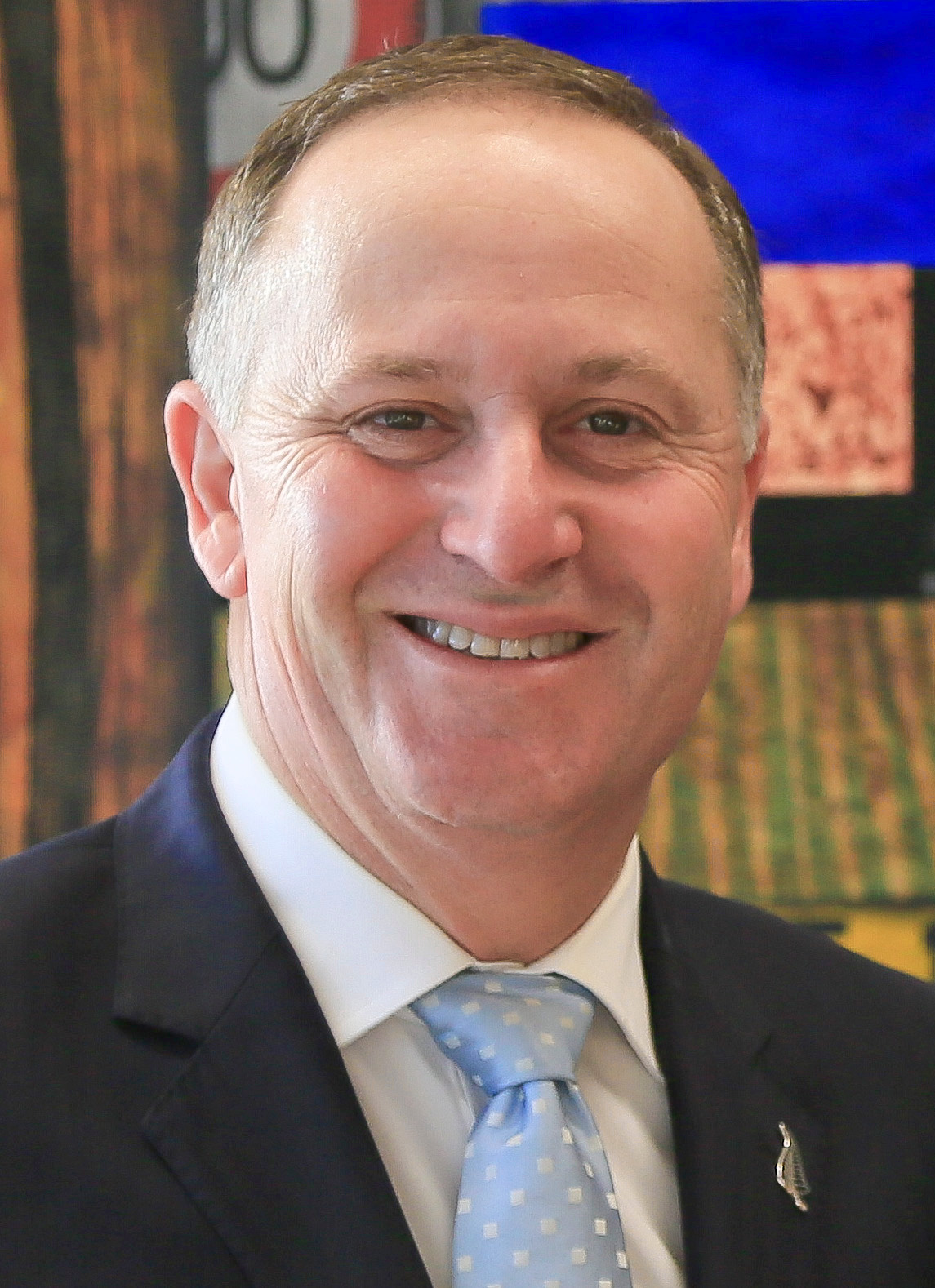
- Key in 2015

38th Prime Minister of New Zealand
- In office 19 November 2008 – 12 December 2016
- Monarch: Elizabeth II
- Governors-General: Anand Satyanand; Jerry Mateparae; Patsy Reddy
- Deputy: Bill English
- Preceded by: Helen Clark
- Succeeded by: Bill English

31st Leader of the Opposition
- In office 27 November 2006 – 19 November 2008
- Deputy: Bill English
- Preceded by: Don Brash
- Succeeded by: Phil Goff

11th Leader of the National Party
- In office 27 November 2006 – 12 December 2016
- Deputy: Bill English
- Preceded by: Don Brash
- Succeeded by: Bill English

Chairman of the International Democrat Union
- In office 21 November 2014 – 21 February 2018
- Deputy: Tony Clement
- Preceded by: John Howard
- Succeeded by: Stephen Harper

Member of the New Zealand Parliament for Helensville
- In office 27 July 2002 – 14 April 2017
- Preceded by: Constituency established
- Succeeded by: Chris Penk
- Majority: 20,547 (56.49%)

Personal details
- Born: John Phillip Key; 9 August 1961 (age 65) Auckland, New Zealand
- Party: National
- Spouse: Bronagh Dougan (m. 1984)
- Children: 2
- Education: University of Canterbury (BCom)
- Website: Official website

Sir John Phillip Key (born 9 August 1961) is a New Zealand retired politician who served as the 38th prime minister of New Zealand from 2008 to 2016 and as leader of the National Party from 2006 to 2016.

Following his father's death when he was eight, Key was raised by his single mother in a state-house in the Christchurch suburb of Bryndwr. He attended the University of Canterbury and graduated in 1981 with a Bachelor of Commerce. He began a career in the foreign exchange market in New Zealand before moving overseas to work for Merrill Lynch, in which he became head of global foreign exchange in 1995, a position he would hold for six years. In 1999 he was appointed a member of the Foreign Exchange Committee of the Federal Reserve Bank of New York until leaving in 2001.

Key entered the New Zealand Parliament representing the Auckland electorate of Helensville as one of the few new National members of parliament in the election of 2002 following National's significant defeat of that year. In 2004, he was appointed Finance Spokesman for National and eventually succeeded Don Brash as the National Party leader in 2006. After two years as leader of the Opposition, Key led his party to victory at the November 2008 general election. He was subsequently sworn in as prime minister on 19 November 2008. The National government went on to win two more general elections under his leadership: in November 2011 and September 2014. Key was expected to contest for a fourth term of office at the 2017 general election, but on 5 December 2016 he resigned as prime minister and leader of the National Party. He was succeeded by Bill English on 12 December 2016. After resigning from both posts in December 2016 and leaving politics, Key was appointed to the board of directors and role of chairman in several New Zealand corporations.

As prime minister, Key led the Fifth National Government of New Zealand which entered government at the beginning of the late-2000s recession in 2008. He was described as supporting both socially liberal and economically liberal policies. Key was worth an estimated US$35 million in 2016, making him the wealthiest individual ever to assume the premiership. In his first term, Key's government implemented a GST rise and personal tax cuts, while enacting several austerity measures. In February 2011, after a major earthquake in Christchurch, the nation's second largest city, significantly affected the national economy, the government formed the Canterbury Earthquake Recovery Authority. In its second term, Key's government implemented a policy of partial privatisation of five state-owned enterprises, while voters in a citizens-initiated referendum on the issue were 2 to 1 opposed to the policy. He also faced a severe housing crisis, especially in Auckland, and was widely criticised for a perceived lack of action. In foreign policy, Key withdrew New Zealand Defence Force personnel from their deployment in the war in Afghanistan, signed the Wellington Declaration with the United States and pushed for more nations to join the Trans-Pacific Partnership.

== Early life and education ==
Key was born in Auckland to George Key (1914–1969) and Ruth Key (née Lazar; 1922–2000) on 9 August 1961. His father was an English immigrant and a veteran of the Spanish Civil War and World War II, who died of a heart attack when his son was eight years old. Key and his two sisters were raised in a state house in the Christchurch suburb of Bryndwr by his mother, an Austrian-Jewish refugee who escaped the Holocaust. Key is the third prime minister or premier of New Zealand to have Jewish ancestry, after Julius Vogel and Francis Bell.

He attended Aorangi School, and then Burnside High School from 1975 to 1979, where he met his wife, Bronagh. He went on to attend the University of Canterbury and earned a Bachelor of Commerce degree in accounting in 1981. He also attended management studies courses at Harvard University, in the United States.

== Career before politics ==
Key's first job was as an auditor at McCulloch Menzies in 1982. He then became a project manager at Christchurch-based clothing manufacturer Lane Walker Rudkin for two years. He worked as a foreign exchange dealer at Elders Finance in Wellington, and rose to the position of head foreign exchange trader two years later, then moved to Auckland-based Bankers Trust in 1988.

In 1995, he joined Merrill Lynch as head of Asian foreign exchange in Singapore. That same year he was promoted to Merrill's global head of foreign exchange, based in London, where he may have earned around US$2.25 million a year including bonuses, which is about NZ$5 million at 2001 exchange rates. Some co-workers called him "the smiling assassin" for maintaining his usual cheerfulness while sacking dozens (some say hundreds) of staff after heavy losses from the 1998 Russian financial crisis. He was a member of the Foreign Exchange Committee of the New York Federal Reserve Bank from 1999 to 2001.

In 1998, on learning of his interest in pursuing a political career, National Party president John Slater began working to recruit him. Former party leader Jenny Shipley describes him as one of the people she "deliberately sought out and put my head on the line–either privately or publicly–to get them in there".

== Early political career ==
New Zealand Parliament
Years	Term	Electorate	List	Party
2002–2005	47th	Helensville	43	National
2005–2008	48th	Helensville	7	National
2008–2011	49th	Helensville	1	National
2011–2014	50th	Helensville	1	National
2014–2017	51st	Helensville	1	National

=== Early years in Parliament ===
Auckland's population growth led to the formation for the 2002 general election of a new electorate called Helensville, which covered the north-western corner of the Auckland urban area. Key beat long-serving National MP Brian Neeson (whose own Waitakere seat had moved on paper to being a Labour seat through the boundary changes) for the National Party Helensville selection. At the 2002 general election Key won the seat with a majority of 1,705, ahead of Labour's Gary Russell, with Neeson, now standing as an independent, coming third.

The National Party was heavily defeated in the 2002 election, receiving only 20.9% of the party vote – the party's worst-ever election result. Following the fallout, a leadership coup against the incumbent Bill English was launched by Don Brash, another of the 2002 recruits, in October 2003. English and his supporters offered Key the finance spokesman position for his vote and were confident they had the numbers with him on their side. Brash narrowly won 14 votes to 12 and at the time it was thought Key had changed his support to Brash. The votes were confidential, although later Key stated that he did vote for English.

Key won re-election at the 2005 general election, garnering 63% of votes cast. He increased his majority again in 2008, gaining 73% of the electorate vote.

=== Finance spokesman ===
The low numbers in the National caucus meant Key was given more opportunities and responsibilities than most new Members of Parliament would. After serving as deputy finance spokesman under Brash, Key was promoted to the Opposition front benches in 2004 as party spokesman for finance. Key was up against Michael Cullen, the Minister of Finance and a veteran of 23 years in parliament. There was concern he would be out of his depth going up against Cullen in his first term and there was talk among the party of trying to "protect" Key. During the 2005 election campaign political commentators felt Key matched Cullen in the debates, although he may have benefited from Labour focusing their campaign on discrediting Brash.

Although Brash lost the election, Key remained as finance spokesman. He was promoted to number four on the list, partly due to his success at selling the party's tax package during the campaign. While Key's ambition to become leader had been telegraphed from early in his political career, he was now beginning to rate highly on preferred prime minister polls. Rumours that Key was looking to take over the leadership circulated and there was an unofficial agreement between Brash and Key that he would be the natural successor.

Things came to a head earlier than expected. In November 2006 Brash resigned as leader, citing damaging speculation over his future as the reason. Brash's resignation followed controversies over an extramarital affair, and over leaked internal National Party documents that were later published in the book The Hollow Men. After months of speculation, Key stood for leadership of the party and was elected unopposed.

== Leader of the Opposition ==
On becoming leader Key convinced Gerry Brownlee, deputy leader under Brash, to step aside and promoted his main rival English to deputy leader and finance spokesman. He showed a ruthless streak by unceremoniously pushing Brash out and refusing to allow another one of the 2002 recruits, Brian Connell, back into the caucus. In his maiden speech as National Party leader, Key spoke of an "underclass" that had been "allowed to develop" in New Zealand, a theme which received a large amount of media coverage. Key followed up on this speech in February 2007 by committing his party to a programme which would provide food in the poorest schools in New Zealand.

In opposition he was instrumental in promoting National's change of policy regarding keeping superannuation and Kiwibank. He also supported interest-free student loans and early childhood education funding. He relented on his stance in opposition to Sue Bradford's Child Discipline Bill, which sought to remove "reasonable force" as a defence for parents charged with prima facie assault of their children. Key and Prime Minister Helen Clark agreed a compromise – giving police the discretion to overlook smacking they regarded as "inconsequential".

In August 2007 Key came in for criticism when he changed his position regarding the Therapeutic Products and Medicine Bill. At the same time Labour's Trevor Mallard hinted in Parliament that Labour would try to link Key to the 1987 "H-Fee" scandal, which involved Key's former employer Elders Merchant Finance and a payment to Equiticorp Chief Executive Allan Hawkins. Hawkins and Elders executive Ken Jarrett were later jailed for fraud. Key declaring that he had left Elders months before the event, that he had no knowledge of the deal, and that his interview with the Serious Fraud Office (SFO) during the investigation into the affair could only have helped to convict the people involved. Then-SFO director Charles Sturt publicly supported Key's statement.

Labour MPs criticised Key for not releasing specific policy information at their annual conference. Key responded that National would set its own policy agenda and that there was adequate time before the next election for voters to digest National Party policy proposals.

== Prime Minister (2008–2016) ==
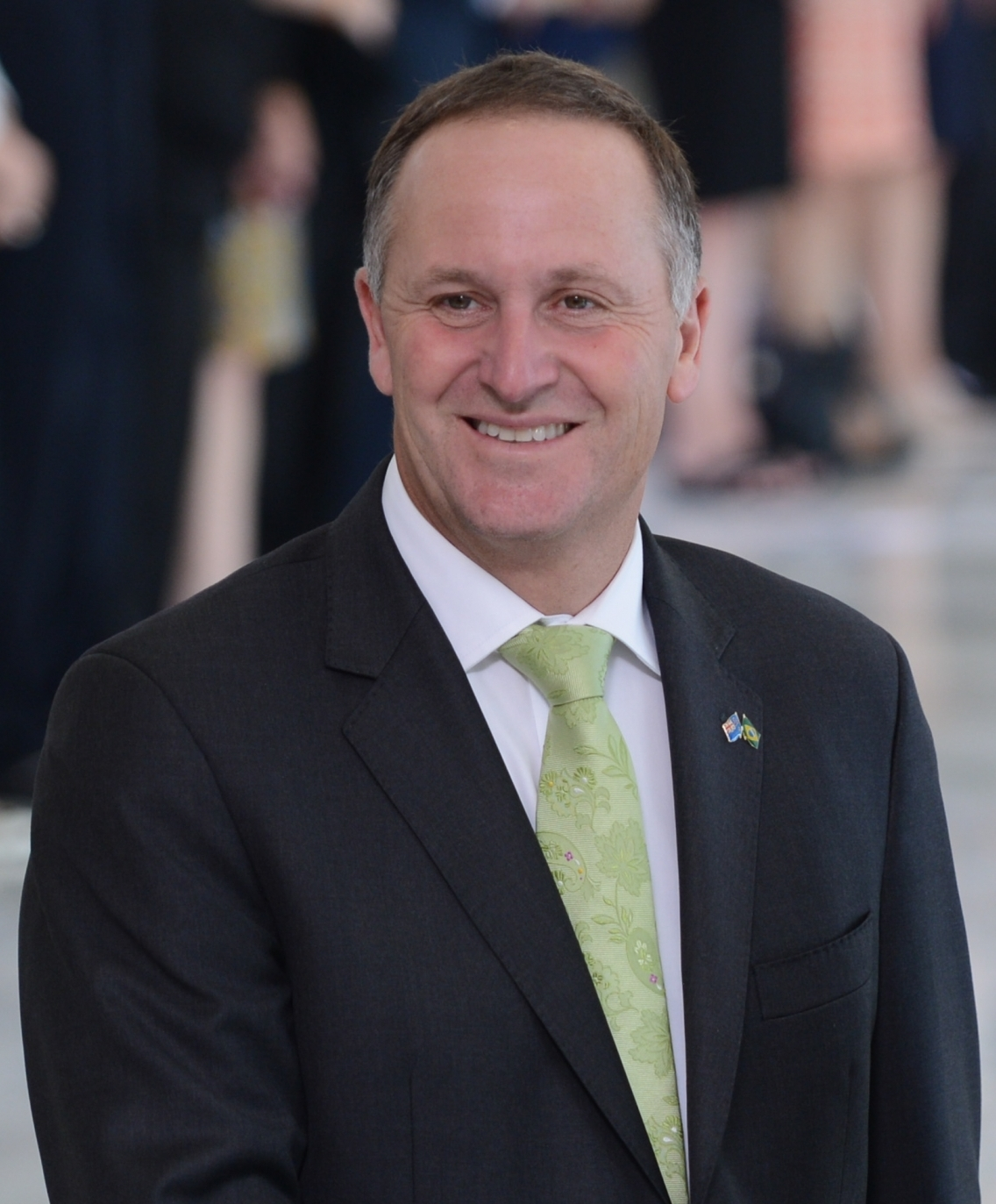
- Premiership of John Key; 19 November 2008 – 12 December 2016
- Monarch: Elizabeth II
- Cabinet: Fifth National Government of New Zealand
- Party: New Zealand National Party
- Election: 2008, 2011, 2014
- Appointed by: Anand Satyanand
- Seat: Premier House

=== First term: 2008–2011 ===
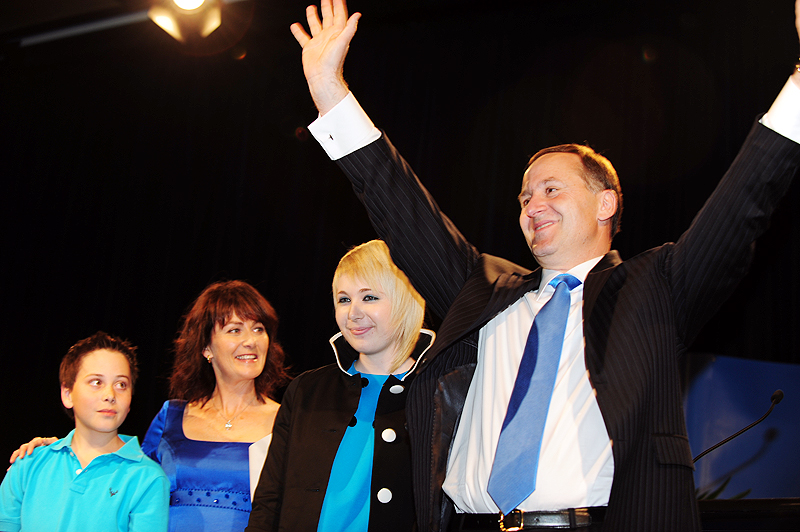
John Key (right), with (from left to right) son Max, wife Bronagh, and daughter Stephie, celebrating on election night, 8 November 2008

Key became prime minister following the general election on 8 November 2008, which signalled an end to the Labour-led government of nine years under Clark. The National Party won 45% of the party vote and 58 of the 122 seats in Parliament, overtaking the incumbent majority Labour Party.

National negotiated with smaller parties to form a minority government with confidence and supply from the classical-liberal ACT Party, the centrist United Future and the indigenous-rights-based Māori Party.

Key was sworn in as Prime Minister and Minister of Tourism and also appointed as a member of the Executive Council on 19 November 2008, along with his nominated cabinet. He chose Bill English as his Deputy Prime Minister and Minister of Finance. During his first term in office National remained high in the polls and one commentator described support for Key as "stratospheric". In 2011 he was nicknamed "Teflon John" in the popular media, as nothing damaging to his reputation seemed to "stick" to him.

Key's government introduced several bold economic policies in response to the global economic downturn that began shortly after he took office. The government introduced a plan of personal tax cuts, reducing taxes on all income; the top personal tax rate was lowered from 39% to 38% and then 33%. In its first budget the government raised the rate of Goods and Services Tax (GST) from 12.5% to 15%, despite Key previously stating that an increase would not happen under a National government. Key's government also enacted several austerity measures. His government declined to renew license agreements for multiple television channels, including TVNZ 6, TVNZ 7, Kidzone and Heartland, while reducing funding for Radio New Zealand in real terms.

In January 2009, after addressing Chinese New Year celebrations at the Greenlane ASB Showgrounds, Key tripped after coming down a small set of stairs in front of cameras, leaving him with a broken right arm and "embarrassed". Later that year, when arriving at the Ngāpuhi Te Tii Waitangi Marae the day before Waitangi Day, Key was briefly shoved and grabbed by two protesters before diplomatic protection officers pulled them off. He told reporters he was "quite shocked" but continued onto the marae and spoke, while police took the two men away and charged them with assault.

Key was tied with the National Cycleway Project since its conception at the national Job Summit in early 2009. He proposed it, and as Minister for Tourism, was instrumental in getting NZ$50 million approved for initial construction work.

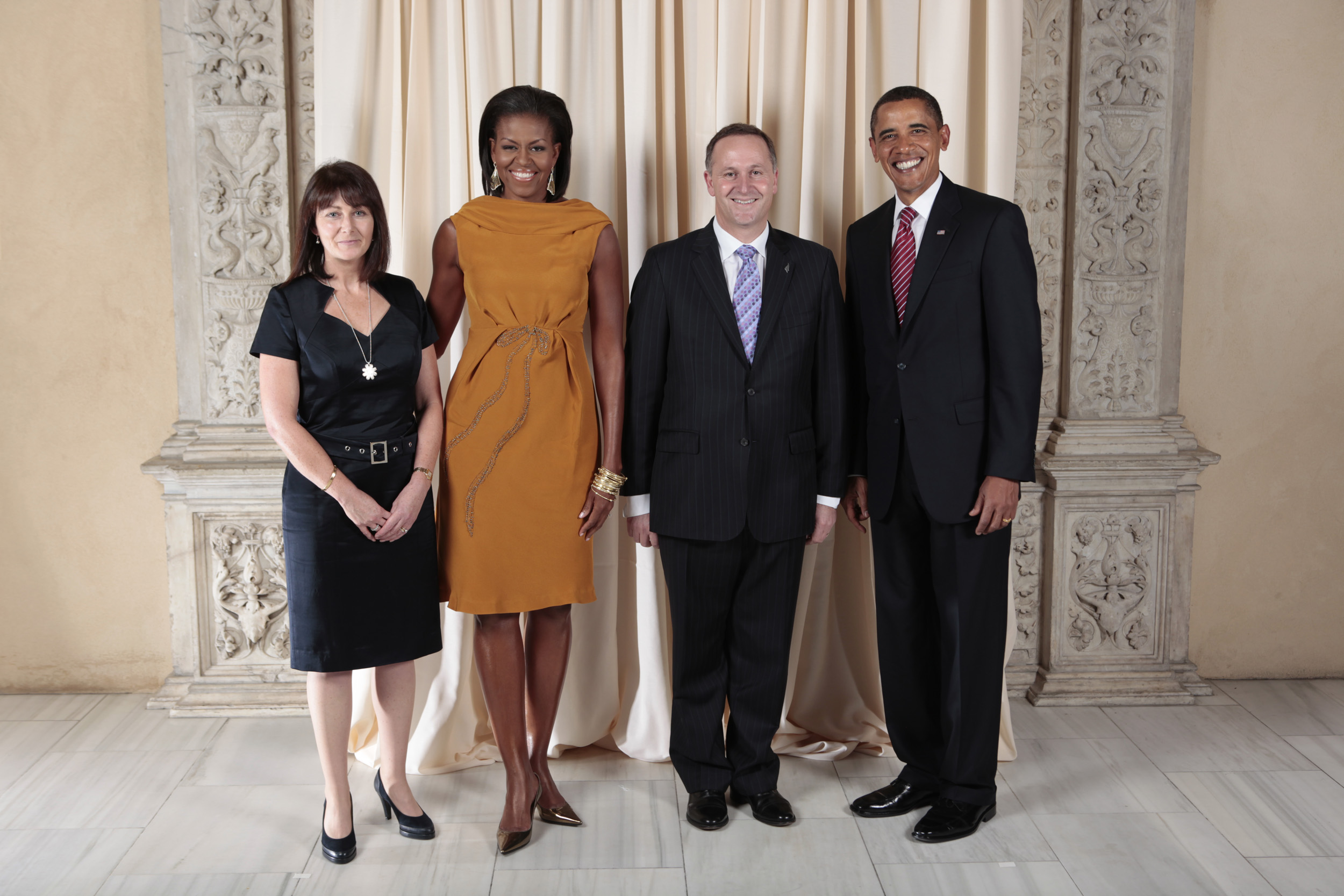
John and Bronagh Key with Barack and Michelle Obama at the Metropolitan Museum in New York, 23 September 2009.

Key launched New Zealand's campaign for a Security Council seat at the UN General Assembly meeting in September 2009. He met briefly with US President Barack Obama and former US President Bill Clinton. While in New York City, Key appeared on the Late Show with David Letterman. He read out the Top Ten list, 'Top Ten Reasons You Should Visit New Zealand'.

In foreign policy, Key supported closer relations with the United States, an ANZUS defence partner. On 4 November 2010, US Secretary of State Hillary Clinton and New Zealand Foreign Minister Murray McCully signed the Wellington Declaration. The agreement signalled an increase in the strategic partnership between the two nations and covered areas of co-operation including nuclear proliferation, climate change and terrorism. This was followed in June 2012 by a companion document, the Washington Declaration. Since 2008 Key has also engaged in Trans-Pacific Partnership negotiations with the United States and other Asia-Pacific economies.

On 22 February 2011 a 6.3 magnitude earthquake struck Christchurch, causing widespread damage to the city region and significantly affecting the national economy. It was New Zealand's third deadliest natural disaster, killing 185 people. Addressing the nation, Key said that the disaster "...may well be New Zealand's darkest day". On 29 March 2011, Key created the Canterbury Earthquake Recovery Authority (CERA) to manage the earthquake recovery, co-operating with the government, local councils and residents.

On 8 March 2011, John Key advised Queen Elizabeth II, Queen of New Zealand, to appoint Jerry Mateparae as the next Governor-General of New Zealand. The Queen made the appointment later that day.

In October 2011, Key was caught up in a controversy over the replacement of 34 three-year-old Government BMW limousines with new ones at a time of economic restraint. Initially, Key denied any knowledge of the plan, although reports later surfaced showing that his office was aware of the deal. Political opponents accused Key and his government of hypocrisy; he later apologised, calling it a "sloppy" deal, effectively placing most of the blame on his chief of staff.

Shortly before the general election in November 2011, a recording was made of a conversation between Key and ACT Party candidate John Banks that they considered private – though the conversation took place in a public cafe. Key made a complaint to the police and compared the incident to illegal phone hacking in the News of the World scandal in Britain. The recording allegedly concerned the leadership of ACT and disparaging remarks about elderly New Zealand First supporters. Journalists and opposition parties demanded the release of the tapes and the affair was nicknamed 'teapot tape'. A senior barrister criticised Key, stating that the comparison of the recording to the phone hacking scandal was a "cheap shot".

Statements made by Key regarding New Zealand's national credit rating proved controversial. In October 2011 he claimed that Standard & Poor's (S&P) had said that "if there was a change of Government, that downgrade would be much more likely". S&P contradicted the claim, bringing Key's credibility into question. National won the election, but New Zealand's credit rating was subsequently downgraded anyway – by two different agencies – Standard and Poor's and Fitch Group.

=== Second term: 2011–2014 ===
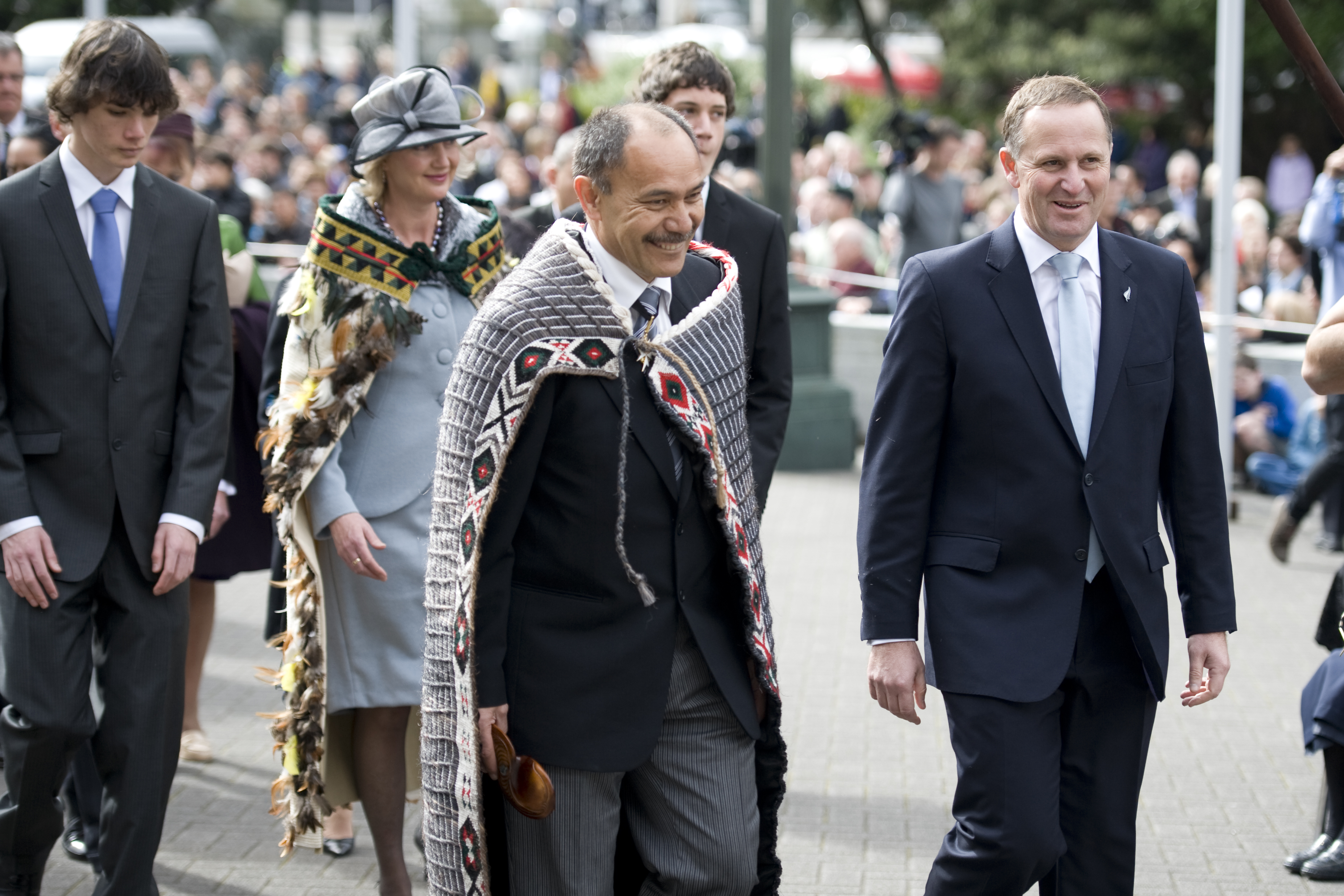
Sir Jerry Mateparae, the Governor-General, arrives at Parliament to be met by Key, July 2011.

The general election on 26 November 2011 saw National increase its share of the vote and gain a seat, while Labour suffered further losses. Key called the election a "very happy night" and a "strong and solid win" for his party. The Prime Minister re-negotiated confidence and supply agreements with United Future, the ACT Party and the Māori Party, to secure a second term of government.

In 2012, Key was implicated in the arrest of Kim Dotcom and the subsequent revelations that the Government Communications Security Bureau (GCSB) had illegally spied on Dotcom. As prime minister, Key was directly responsible for the GCSB, which is not allowed to spy on New Zealand citizens – and Dotcom had been granted permanent residency. Three days later, Key apologised for the illegal spying. "I apologize to Mr Dotcom. I apologize to New Zealanders because every New Zealander…is entitled to be protected from the law when it comes to the GCSB, and we failed to provide that appropriate protection for him." It subsequently came to light that Deputy Prime Minister Bill English had been asked by the GCSB to sign a "ministerial certificate" suppressing details of the bureau's involvement in the case while Key was overseas – the only time this had been done in the last ten years.

The fallout from Dotcom's arrest continued in December when the High Court ordered the GCSB to "confirm all entities" to which it gave information, opening the door for Dotcom to sue for damages – against the spy agency and the police. Later that month, Key's rating as preferred PM dropped to 39% – the first time in his four years as prime minister that his rating had slipped below 40%. It emerged that Key had known Ian Fletcher, head of the GCSB, since they were at school, but Key denied he had 'shoulder-tapped' Fletcher for the role. Later Key's office released a statement saying he rang Fletcher and recommended he apply for the position at GCSB. Key said he hadn't originally mentioned the phone call because he "forgot". Political commentator Bryce Edwards called it the "most appalling political management since he became Prime Minister back in 2008".

Key continued New Zealand's push for a spot on the UN Security Council while in New York in 2013. There he accused rival candidates Spain and Turkey of using aid money to buy votes from small African countries, and said New Zealand would not be spending its way onto the Council. While in New York, Key suddenly fell ill, but recovered in time for meetings with representatives from other countries ahead of the General Assembly.

In April 2013, whilst visiting Chinese president Xi Jinping in Beijing, Key made headlines by suggesting New Zealand would back any United States or Australian military action against North Korea. The following day he backtracked, saying the chance of New Zealand troops entering North Korea was "so far off the planet".

=== Third term: 2014–2016 ===
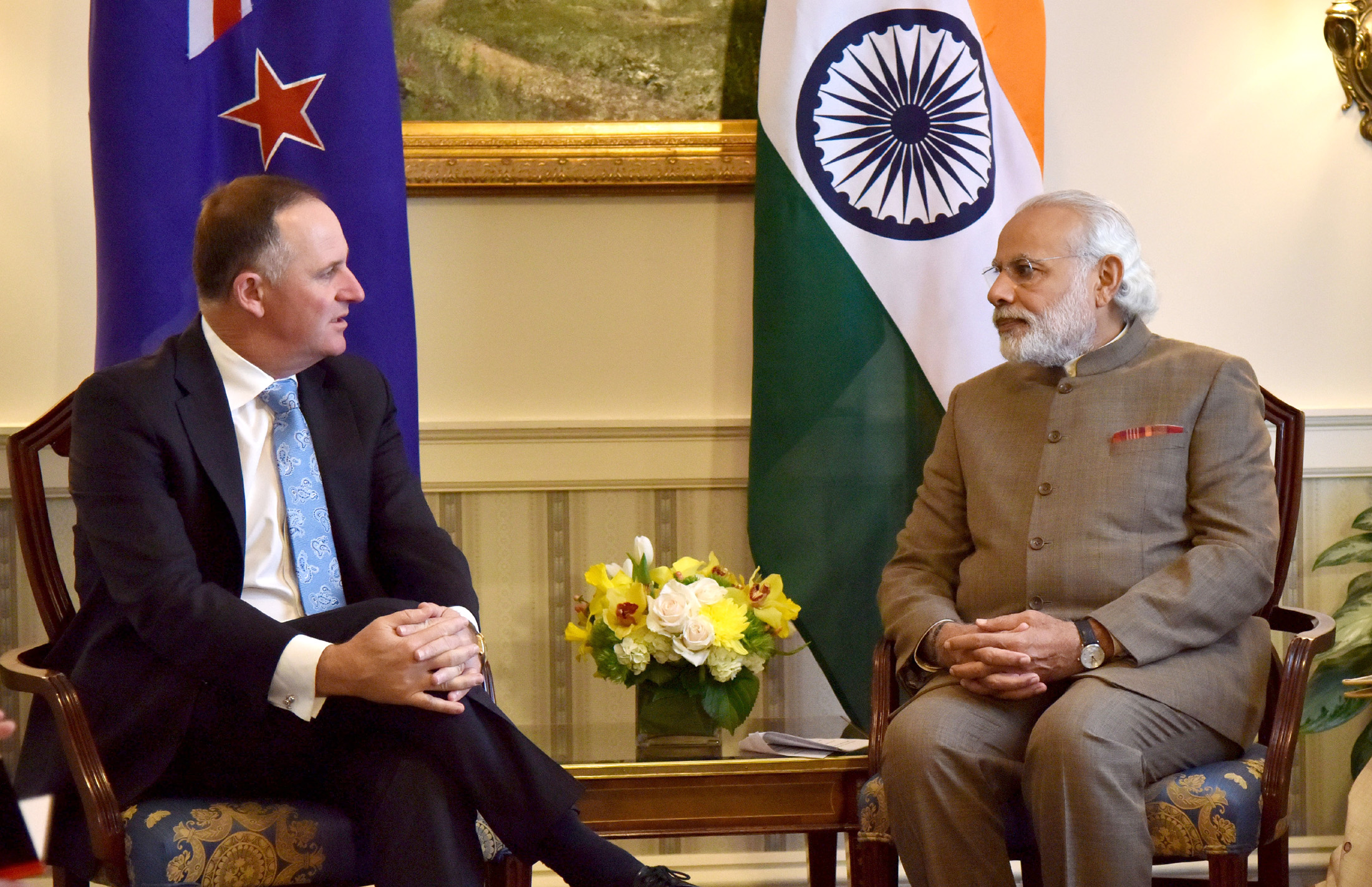
Key with the Indian Prime Minister, Narendra Modi, 31 March 2016.

The general election on 20 September 2014 saw the National Government returned again. National won a plurality with 47.0% of the party vote and 60 of the 121 seats. On election night counts the party appeared to hold the first majority since 1994 with 61 seats, but lost a list seat (for Maureen Pugh) to the Green Party on the official count (including special votes) of the party vote. National re-entered a confidence and supply arrangement with United Future, the ACT Party and the Māori Party.

In October, Key created a new ministerial portfolio called the Minister of National Security and Intelligence to serve the newly established Cabinet National Security Committee. The Prime Minister assumed the new portfolio while the Attorney General Christopher Finlayson became Minister Responsible for the GCSB and Minister in Charge of the New Zealand Security Intelligence Service (NZSIS), portfolios which have traditionally been held by a prime minister. Key was elected Chairman of the International Democrat Union (IDU), an international alliance of centre-right political parties. The National Party was a founding member party in 1983.

In April 2015, Key acknowledged that he had pulled a waitress' ponytail multiple times over several months; when Key learnt she had taken offence, he apologised. International media reported the incident as "ponytail-gate".

Key had long supported changing the flag of New Zealand, and during the 2014 general election campaign promised a referendum on the issue. Following the election win, two New Zealand flag referendums were held in November/December 2015 and March 2016. The second resulted in the retention of the current flag. Critics (both national and international) charged that the referendums were unnecessary, expensive and a "wasteful vanity project".

The New Zealand housing crisis took hold substantially following Key's third term. From the time Key took office until the year he left, average housing prices had more than doubled. Key repeatedly refused to call the property bubble a crisis, claiming it instead was a "challenge". The prime minister was challenged over his criticism of Helen Clark's government's response to the housing crisis during the 2008 campaign, but reluctance to take a stand now it had worsened considerably. A Newshub poll released in May 2016 showed that 76% of New Zealanders felt the government was not doing enough to control the housing market, while only 20% thought it had housing under control.

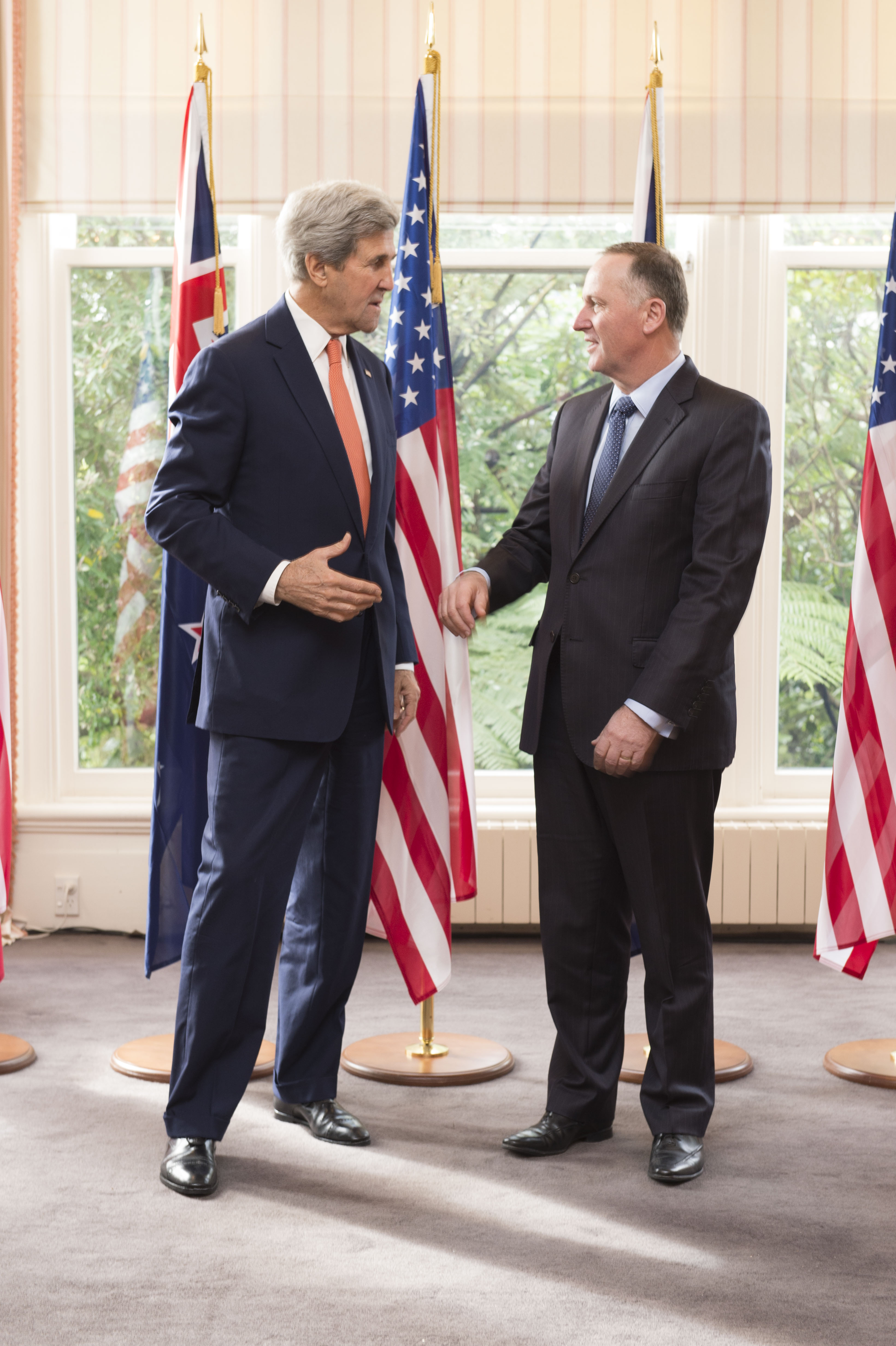
U.S. Secretary of State John Kerry meets Key at Premier House, 13 November 2016.

International trade and the negotiation of free-trade agreements were a priority in Key's third term. He was a leading advocate of the Trans-Pacific Partnership (TPP), also supporting the Trans-Pacific Strategic Economic Partnership (TPSEP). Both agreements provide for a multilateral free-trade area in the Asia–Pacific region. In a September 2016 speech to the Council of Foreign Relations, Key said "[TPP] will boost our economy by at least $2.7 billion a year by 2030. It will help diversify our economy and create more jobs and higher incomes for New Zealanders". Key was particularly intent on securing the participation of the United States in the agreement; to this end, he discussed TPP with President Barack Obama in April 2016, and hosted Secretary of State John Kerry in Wellington, 9–13 November 2016. The finalised TPP proposal was signed on 4 February 2016 in Auckland, concluding seven years of negotiations. In January 2017, US President Donald Trump signed a presidential memorandum to withdrawing the United States' signature from the agreement, making its ratification virtually impossible.

In February 2016, Key reached an agreement with Australian Prime Minister Malcolm Turnbull to grant New Zealanders living in Australia a pathway to citizenship if they were earning five times over the average wage. As a result of this agreement, the Australian Government introduced the "Skilled Independent visa (subclass 189)" in July 2017 to fast-track the Australian citizenship naturalisation process for New Zealanders living in Australia. New Zealanders living in Australia for at least five years and earning an annual income over A$53,900 were eligible for the visa. By late February 2018, 1,512 Subclass 189 visas had been issued. However, this visa scheme was criticised by the "Ozkiwi lobby" since two-thirds of New Zealanders living in Australia did not meet the qualifying wage.

In March 2016, Queen Elizabeth II, Queen of New Zealand, approved the appointment of Dame Patsy Reddy as the next Governor-General of New Zealand, for a five-year term starting in September 2016, on the advice of John Key.

Key resigned as prime minister and leader of the National Party effective from 12 December 2016, and instructed the party to put into motion the processes to elect a new leader. He expressed interest in spending more time with his family, stating that he had "never seen [himself] as a career politician" and that "this feels the right time to go". Media reports described the decision as unexpected, and noted the popularity of Key and his party. Bill English won the 2016 New Zealand National Party leadership election to succeed Key.

== Post-prime ministerial career ==
Following his resignation, Key stated that he would leave Parliament before the 2017 general election. However, he stated that he would resign within six months of the election so as to not trigger a by-election in the Helensville electorate. He gave his valedictory speech in Parliament on 22 March 2017 and formally resigned the following month, on 14 April.

In May 2017, Key was appointed to the board of directors of Air New Zealand, and took up the position on 1 September 2017. He was also appointed chairman of ANZ Bank New Zealand, taking up the position on 18 October 2017. On 31 March 2020, Key stood down as a director of Air New Zealand. He joined the board of American cybersecurity company Palo Alto Networks in 2019.

On 3 September 2025, Key along with fellow former Prime Minister Helen Clark attended the 2025 China Victory Day Parade held in Beijing's Forbidden City on 3 September 2025 to mark the 80th anniversary of Japan's surrender at the end of World War II. The two former heads of governments also met with General Secretary of the Chinese Communist Party and Chinese President Xi Jinping. The two former Prime Ministers were among 70 special international guests invited by Xi to attend the military parade alongside Russian President Vladimir Putin, North Korean Supreme Leader Kim Jong Un and Belarusian President Alexander Lukashenko. Chinese Ambassador Wang Xiaolong praised the two Prime Ministers for attending the commemorative events, stating that China and New Zealand had fought side by side during World War II.

In February 2026, Key joined the board of New Zealand education company Crimson Education, taking up the position of chairman.

== Political and social views ==
Key's views were largely aligned with his own party's view. However, he noted that his differences from his predecessor are more of style and focus rather than view.

=== Alcohol regulation ===
In 2008 Key voted for an attempt to raise the legal drinking age from 18 back to 20, but ignored a Law Commission recommendation to increase levies on alcohol. He claimed there was "no appetite" for such a move. A report on public attitudes to alcohol law reform was later discovered, which indicated that in 2010, when he made this claim, 56% of New Zealanders supported a price increase.

=== Climate change ===
Key says that global warming is a real phenomenon, and that the Government needed to implement measures to reduce human contribution to global warming. Key committed the National Party to working towards reducing greenhouse emissions in New Zealand by 50% within the next fifty years. Commentators note that as late as 2005, Key made statements indicating that he was sceptical of the effects and impact of climate change.

=== COVID-19 ===
In September 2021, Key criticised the Labour Government's elimination-based lockdown policies in response to the COVID-19 pandemic in New Zealand, likening it to making New Zealand a hermit kingdom like North Korea. He also accused the Government of ruling by fear and lacking a post-lockdown strategy. To speed up COVID-19 vaccination, he recommended boosting funding for Māori and Pasifika health providers, introducing financial incentives for young people, and allowing only vaccinated people into licensed premises. TVNZ journalist Jack Tame described Key's views on the Government's handling of COVID-19 as provocative but praised his five-point plan as a "collection of sensible ideas worthy of consideration."

=== Euthanasia ===
During the 2020 New Zealand euthanasia referendum, Key publicly expressed support for the End of Life Choice Act 2019, saying that his mother's struggle with Alzheimer's disease prior to her death convinced him to support the decriminalisation of euthanasia.

=== Foreign policy issues ===
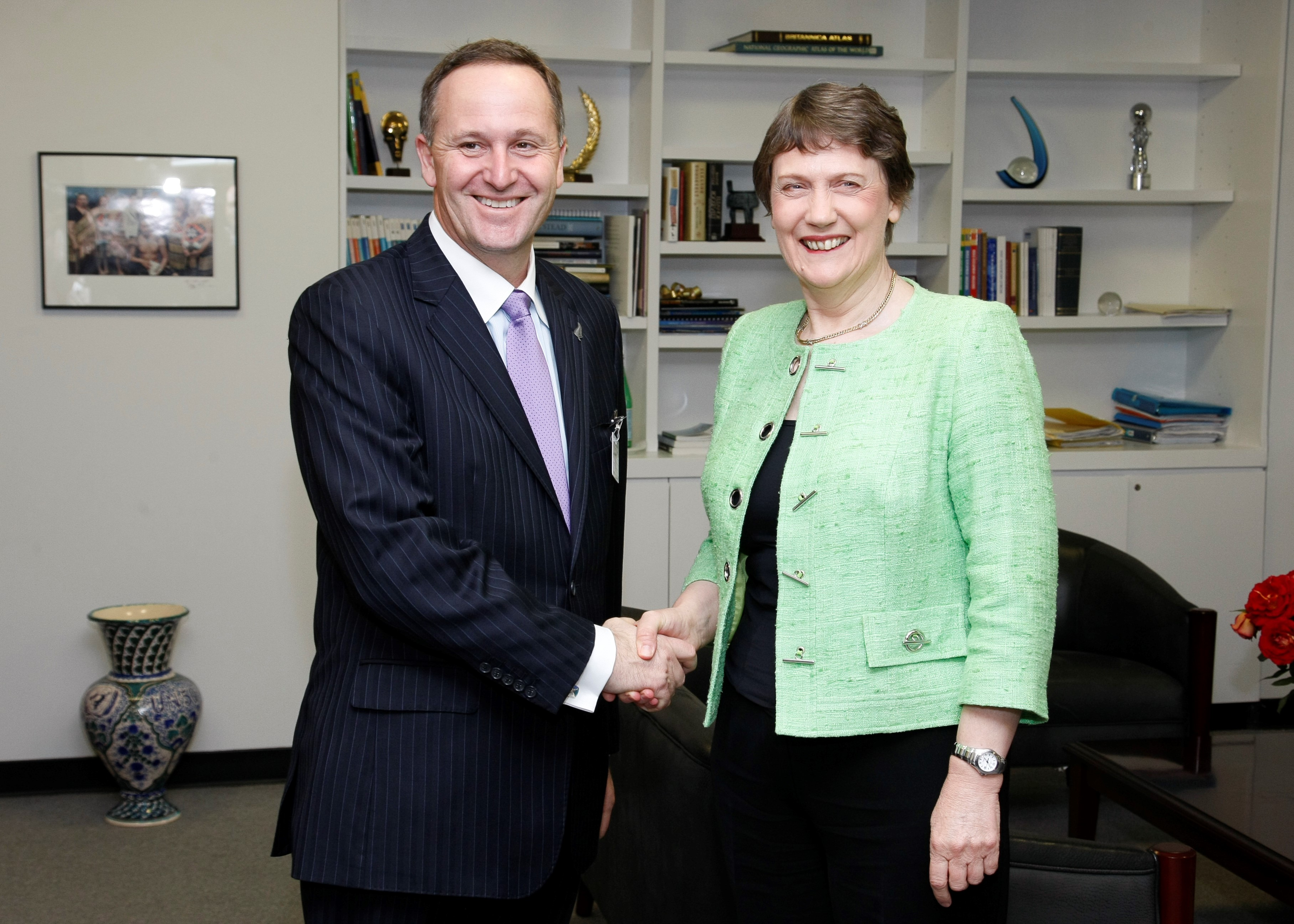
Key with his predecessor, Helen Clark

As a first-term MP in 2003, Key criticised the Labour-led government's stance on the Invasion of Iraq, claiming that New Zealand was "missing in action" by failing to support its ANZUS allies, the United States and Australia. In August 2007 Key claimed that he would have taken a similar position to Clark and not sent troops to Iraq. In response, the Labour-led government argued that his comments from 2003 suggest that Key would have deployed troops had he been prime minister at the time.

In August 2022, Key described Speaker of the U.S. House of Representatives Nancy Pelosi's visit to Taiwan as "reckless" and provocative towards China during an interview with TVNZ journalist Jack Tame. Since Beijing regarded the visit as a violation of the One China Policy, China had downgraded bilateral relations with the United States. During his premiership, Key had cultivated a close relationship with President of China Xi Jinping, describing Xi as "extremely trustworthy, very open, consistent."

In early October 2024, Key opined that Donald Trump was better for the economy while expressing disagreement with his "isolationist" America First foreign policy during the leadup up to the 2024 United States presidential election. During an interview with Stuff, Key said: he's [Trump] likely to embrace a bit more market. He's likely to have less red tape and he's certainly going to have lower taxes. So that bit is good." Key also described the Democratic Party candidate and Vice President Kamala Harris' economic policies as "radically left-wing" and more aligned with Senator Bernie Sanders than President Joe Biden.

In June 2025 Key co-signed a letter with fellow former Prime Minister Helen Clark to criticise the New Zealand government for actions against China. The letter cited a number of decisions as potentially souring New Zealand's relationship with China, including: authorising a naval vessel to sail through the Taiwan Strait "despite knowing that would antagonise China", strengthening military ties with the Philippines "at a time when it is in a low-level military stand-off with China in the South China Sea", sending delegations of MPs to Taiwan "knowing that the visit would cause offence".

=== Māori issues ===
In early August 2024, Key spoke at the National Party's national conference and urged the National-led government to tread carefully on Māori issues including the Treaty Principles Bill (which had been introduced by coalition partner ACT), the planned repeal of section 7AA of the Oranga Tamariki Act 1989 and National's decision to overrule a court ruling on the Marine and Coastal Area (Takutai Moana) Act 2011. He said:

"The important thing is that we're all New Zealanders and I think everybody wants to live in a place where we can respect one another, get along well and foster a better New Zealand. So I'd kind of encourage everyone to maybe take the temperature down a wee bit."

=== Marriage ===
Key had a mixed voting record on social issues. In 2004 he voted against the bill creating civil unions, stating that, while he personally supports such unions, he acted in accordance with his electorate's views. However, in 2005, Key was part of a large bloc of MPs voting to defeat a bill that defined marriage as being between a man and a woman.

Key stated in 2008 that he did not oppose same-sex couples adopting children. In 2013 he expressed support for same-sex marriage and voted for the Marriage (Definition of Marriage) Amendment Act 2013.

=== Monarchy vs Republic ===
Like his predecessor Helen Clark, Key views a New Zealand republic as "inevitable", although probably not for another decade. He said:

If Australia becomes a republic there is no question it will set off quite an intense debate on this side of the Tasman. We would have to have a referendum if we wanted to move towards it."

Key later stated that he was a monarchist, and that a New Zealand republic would "Not [happen] under my watch". In 2009 Key's government restored titular honours, including knighthoods and damehoods — the abolishment of these titles in 2000 had been seen as an advancement towards republicanism.

=== Privatisation ===
Key noted others' concern at the pace of asset sales, but stated that the arguments against selling assets in the 1980s were largely irrational. In a 2002 interview, he said that "some form of orientation towards privatisation" in health, education and superannuation, such as giving firms tax breaks for employer super schemes, made sense. After his party won a plurality in the 2011 election, Key rejected claims that the National Government lacked a mandate to partially privatise state-owned assets.

== Personal life ==
=== Personal wealth ===
On 25 July 2008, Key was added to the New Zealand National Business Review (NBR) Rich List for the first time. The list details the wealthiest New Zealand individuals and family groups. He had an estimated wealth of NZ$50 million, which made him the wealthiest New Zealand Member of Parliament, and the wealthiest prime minister ever. In the 2016 NBR Rich List, Key had an estimated wealth of NZ$60 million. Most of his financial investments are held in a blind trust.

=== Family ===
Key married Bronagh Irene Dougan in 1984; they met when they were both students at Burnside High School. She has a BCom degree, and worked as a personnel consultant before becoming a full-time mother. They have two children, a daughter named Stephanie and a son named Max. Max is a night-time radio host for George FM, and is also a singer. Stephie is a performance artist.

=== Religious views ===
In 2008, Key stated that he attended church frequently with his children, but was an agnostic. He has said that he does not believe in an afterlife, and sees religion as "doing the right thing".

=== Private pilot licence ===
In October 2024, Key revealed that he began studying for helicopter license during the COVID-19 lockdowns in New Zealand and has since logged 280 hours of flight time. Key owns a Guimbal Cabri G2, which he has customised with the proposed alternative New Zealand flag design, three white rabbit emblems for good luck, and his personal callsign, ZK-IJK. Key stated in the news that he mostly flies his helicopter to golf courses.

In 2025, Key has exported Cabri G2 to the United States and operates Airbus H130 under the same registration ZK-IJK.

== Honours ==
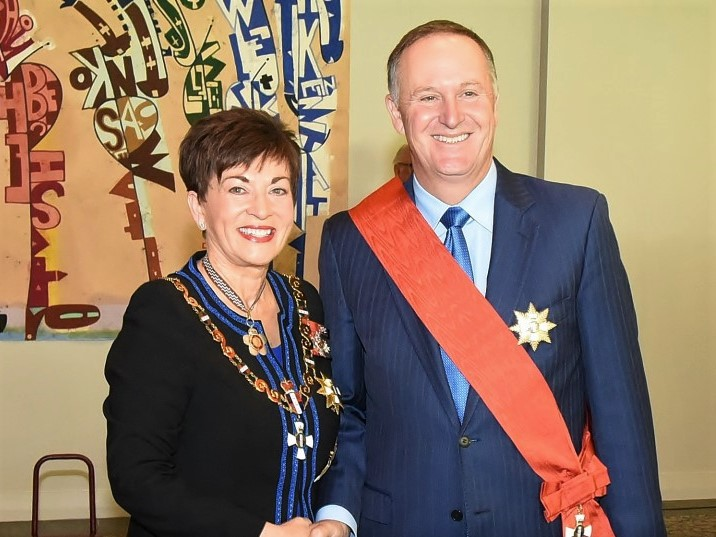
Key with Governor-General Dame Patsy Reddy, shortly after his investiture as a Knight Grand Companion of the New Zealand Order of Merit, August 2017

In 2009, Key was bestowed with the mātai, or Samoan chiefly title, of To'osavili (meaning 'protect from the winds') from the village of Poutasi.

On 3 August 2010, Key gained the style "The Right Honourable". Previously, as he was not a privy councillor, he had not been entitled to use the style—his predecessor ended the appointment of New Zealanders to the Privy Council. However, in 2010 the Queen approved the use of the style by prime ministers, governors-general, speakers of the House, and chief justices.

Key was appointed a Knight Grand Companion of the New Zealand Order of Merit, in recognition of "services to the State", in the 2017 Queen's Birthday Honours. Later Key was appointed an honorary Companion of the Order of Australia, for "eminent service to Australia-New Zealand relations", by the Governor-General of Australia on the personal recommendation of the Australian prime minister, Malcolm Turnbull.

On 7 August 2017, Key was awarded an honorary doctorate by his alma mater, the University of Canterbury, to become a doctor of commerce.

== See also ==
- Electoral history of John Key
- List of New Zealand ministries
- Contents of the United States diplomatic cables leak (New Zealand)

New Zealand Parliament
New constituency	Member of Parliament for Helensville; 2002–2017	Succeeded by Chris Penk
Political offices
Preceded by Don Brash	Leader of the Opposition; 2006–2008	Succeeded by Phil Goff
Preceded by Helen Clark	Prime Minister of New Zealand; 2008–2016	Succeeded by Bill English
Preceded by Damien O'Connor	Minister of Tourism; 2008–2016	Succeeded by Paula Bennett; Acting
New office	Minister of National Security and Intelligence; 2014–2016	Succeeded by Bill English
Party political offices
Preceded by Don Brash	Leader of the National Party; 2006–2016	Succeeded by Bill English
Diplomatic posts
Preceded by John Howard	Chair of the International Democrat Union; 2014–2018	Succeeded by Stephen Harper
