= Macmillan Brown Centre for Pacific Studies =

University of Canterbury research centre

The Macmillan Brown Centre for Pacific Studies (MBC) is a research centre on Pacific Studies within the University of Canterbury. It was founded in 1988 from a bequest of Professor John Macmillan Brown.

Their mission statement is:

To promote and advance scholarship and understanding of the Pacific region, including Aotearoa New Zealand, its people, societies and cultures; histories; arts; politics; environment and resources; developments and future.

== Governance and staff ==
The founding director was Leasiolagi Dr Malama Meleisea.

In 2023 Steven Ratuva is the director of the centre and Christina Laalaai-Tausa is the Research Manager. The University of Canterbury Vice-Chancellor appoints an advisory board. In 2023 people named on the board are Paul Millar, Natalie Baird, Tara Ross, Jane Buckingham, Yvonne Crichton-Hill, Pascale Hatcher and Matthew Scobie.

== Activities ==
=== Publishing ===
The centre publishes research including the online open access journal Pacific Dynamics. Macmillan Brown Press has published a number of books.

=== The Macmillan Brown Pacific Artist in Residence Programme ===
The Macmillan Brown Pacific Artist in Residence Programme is an annual three-month residency that has been going since 1996. It is supported by New Zealand's central arts funding body Creative New Zealand, and 'aims to promote Pacific artistic innovation'.

In 2022 the residency was valued at NZ$18,000 and had a focus on 'environmental protection, climate crisis response and community sustainability'. In 2023 it was valued at NZ$25,000. The 2016 recipient was Christchurch born Ioane Ioane where he created Samoan canoe's. In 2027 the residency went to artist-curator Ema Tavola.

Recipients of the Macmillan Brown Pacific Artist in Residence Programme
Year	Name	Additional information	Ref
1996	Fatu Feu’u	In the inaugural residency Feu'u created the exhibition So'otaga ole Pasifika: Pacific Connections.	
1997	Michel Tuffery		
1998	John Pule		
1999	Andy Lelei		
2000	Lonnie Hutchinson		
2001	Filipe Tohi		
2002	Lurlene Christiansen and Emma Kesha		
2003	Erolia Ifopo and Siaosi Mulipola	In 2003 the Centre broadened to also include performing arts. Ifopo and Mulipola both were part of the company Pacific Underground.	
2004	Dave Fane		
2005	Tusiata Avia		
2006	Sheyne Tuffery		
2007	Johnny Penisula	Penisula is an Invercargill-based Samoan artist. In the residency he created the artwork Le folauga me le afe o Tausaga: The voyage to the next Millennium	
2008	John Ioane		
2009	Kulimoeanga 'Stone' Maka		
2010	Tanya Muagututi'a		
2011	Fatu Feu'u	Fatu Feu’u did a second residency to mark the 15th anniversary of the residence programme.	
2012	Victor Rodger		
2013	No information		
2014	No information		
2015	No information		
2016	Ioane Ioane		
2017	Ema Tavola		
2018	Tanu Gago		
2019	Tuāfale Tanoa’i	Also known as Linda T, Tanoa’i participates in and documents stories from Māori, Pacific and LGBTQI+ communities.	
2020	Nina Oberg Humphries		
2021	Luisa Tora		
2022	Jahra Arieta		
