= Patricia O'Brien (historian) =

Historian of Pacific and Australian studies

Patricia A. O'Brien
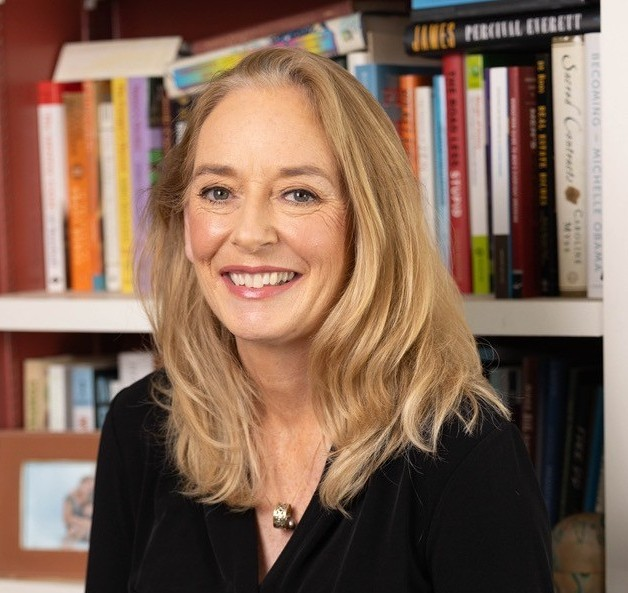
- O'Brien in 2025

Academic background
- Education: University of Sydney (BA [Hons], PhD)

Academic work
- Discipline: History
- Sub-discipline: Australian history Pacific history Colonial and imperial history Biography
- Institutions: Georgetown University (2000–present); Australian National University (2013–2019); Victoria University of Wellington (2012–2013); University of New South Wales (1999–2001)
- Notable works: The Pacific Muse: Exotic Femininity and the Colonial Pacific (2006) Tautai: Samoa, World History and the Life of Ta'isi O. F. Nelson (2017) Errol Flynn: The True Story of Australia's Hollywood Icon (2026)

Patricia A O'Brien is a US-based Australian historian and author. She specializes in Pacific, New Zealand, and Australian studies, and is a faculty member in the Asian Studies Program and Department of History at Georgetown University, as well as an honorary associate professor at the Australian National University (ANU). Her work focuses on Pacific colonial history, biography, and contemporary geopolitics in the region.

== Personal life and education ==
O'Brien was born in the Sydney suburb of Darlinghurst. She received her undergraduate honors degree, university medal, and PhD from the University of Sydney. Her thesis focused on colonial history and exotic femininity in the Pacific, and was the basis of her first book, titled The Pacific Muse.

== Academic career ==
O'Brien's academic career began at the University of New South Wales, Sydney, and from 2000 she began teaching at Georgetown University, Washington DC. In 2011 she held the Jay I. Kislak Fellow in American Studies at the John W. Kluge Center at the Library of Congress and then in 2012, she was appointed the J. D. Stout Fellow in New Zealand Studies at Victoria University, Wellington. In 2013, when she was awarded an Australian Research Council Future Fellow, she began her ongoing connection to the Australian National University, Canberra, where she remains an honorary fellow. In 2020, she returned to Georgetown University's Asian Studies Program and in 2021, began writing on regional issues for The Conversation and The Diplomat.

== Public commentary ==
O'Brien has written on Pacific geopolitics since 2021 as geopolitical competition in the region increased. She has written over 70 articles for The Conversation, The Diplomat, Center for Strategic and International Studies (CSIS), the Lowy Institute's The Interpreter, and Limes - Rivista Italiana di Geopolitica among other publications. She has been interviewed and quoted by The New York Times, CNN, MSNBC's Rachel Maddow Show, France24, various programs on the Australian Broadcasting Corporation, Politico, The Economist, and NPR.

== Scholarship ==
O'Brien's research addresses Australian and Pacific colonial history, examining colonial power, Indigenous experience, and the legacies of empire in the region. Her early work focused on representations of Indigenous women in colonial Australia. She then expanded this study across the Pacific. O'Brien's work examined Western ideas about female beauty and exoticism transplanted into the Pacific during the Enlightenment. Her work also examined Indigenous women's historical experience and resistance to representations of colonial femininity. The Pacific Muse received positive reviews, including in the Journal of Pacific History (2007).

Her work then shifted to Australia's colonial history in New Guinea, its interaction with the League of Nations, and the history of New Zealand's League of Nations Mandate in Samoa. Her work focused on the nationalist leader Ta'isi Olaf Frederick Nelson. O'Brien worked closely with Nelson's descendants, including the then Head of State of Samoa, Tui Ātua Tupua Tamasese Efi, and drew on personal papers. Through this research, she authored the biography Tautai that examined this period and the life of Ta'isi. O'Brien also examined the significance of Ta'isi's friendship with Māori statesman Sir Māui Pōmare. Tautai was published in 2017. It was positively reviewed in Pacific Affairs, where Malama Meleisea described the book as a significant contribution to the history of colonial Samoa.

After this work, O'Brien returned to Australia's colonial history in New Guinea and to Errol Flynn, Australia's first Hollywood Golden Age star, who spent time in New Guinea just before his Hollywood debut in 1935. Errol Flynn: The True Story of Australia's Hollywood Icon was published by Allen & Unwin in April 2026. The book was selected as non-fiction pick of the week by The Sydney Morning Herald and The Age. It was also reviewed in The Monthly and The Australian. The Australian Financial Review drew comparisons between Flynn's rape trial and the cases of Harvey Weinstein and Jeffrey Epstein. In Flynn's native Tasmania, the book was the subject of an opinion piece in The Mercury examining Flynn's legacy. The book won the 2026 General History Prize at the NSW History Awards. The judges described the book as a master stroke, covering a transoceanic history that connects Flynn's life to colonial Australia and Hollywood's Golden Age, and said it stood out from other shortlisted titles for its readability.

== Selected works ==
Books written

- O'Brien, Patricia (2006). The Pacific Muse: Exotic Femininity and the Colonial Pacific. Seattle: University of Washington Press. ISBN 9780295987651.
- O'Brien, Patricia (2017). 100 People Who Shaped Australia: 200 Treasures of the Australian Museum. Sydney: Australian Museum Press.
- O'Brien, Patricia (2017). Tautai: Samoa, World History and the Life of Ta'isi O. F. Nelson. Honolulu: University of Hawai'i Press. ISBN 9780824866532. Wellington: Huia. ISBN 9781775503316.
- O'Brien, Patricia (2026). Errol Flynn: The True Story of Australia's Hollywood Icon. Sydney: Allen & Unwin. ISBN 9781761472954.

Books edited

- Vaughn, Bruce; O'Brien, Patricia, eds. (2005). Amongst Friends: Australian and New Zealand Voices from America. Dunedin: University of Otago Press. ISBN 1877276936.
- Damousi, Joy; O'Brien, Patricia, eds. (2018). League of Nations: Histories, Legacies and Impact. Melbourne: Melbourne University Press. ISBN 9780522872514.

Articles

- O'Brien, Patricia (2012). "Reactions to Australian Colonial Violence in New Guinea: The 1926 Nakanai Massacre in a Global Context". Australian Historical Studies. 43 (2): 191–209. doi:10.1080/1031461X.2012.677458.
- O'Brien, Patricia (2021). "75 Years After Nuclear Testing in the Pacific Began, the Fallout Continues to Wreak Havoc". The Conversation.
- O'Brien, Patricia (2021). "Wild Colonial Boy: Errol Flynn's Rape Trial, Pacific Pasts and the Making of Hollywood". Australian Historical Studies: 1–20. doi:10.1080/1031461x.2021.1889006.
- O'Brien, Patricia (2021). "The Deep Roots of the Solomon Islands' Ongoing Political Crisis". Center for Strategic and International Studies.
- O'Brien, Patricia (2024). "France's Colonial Legacy in the Pacific: A Contemporary Crisis". The Diplomat.
- O'Brien, Patricia; Henao, Douveri (2024). "Papua New Guinea: All Geopolitics is Local". The Diplomat.
