= Marilyn Kohlhase =

New Zealand arts curator and administrator

Marilyn Kohlhase MNZM
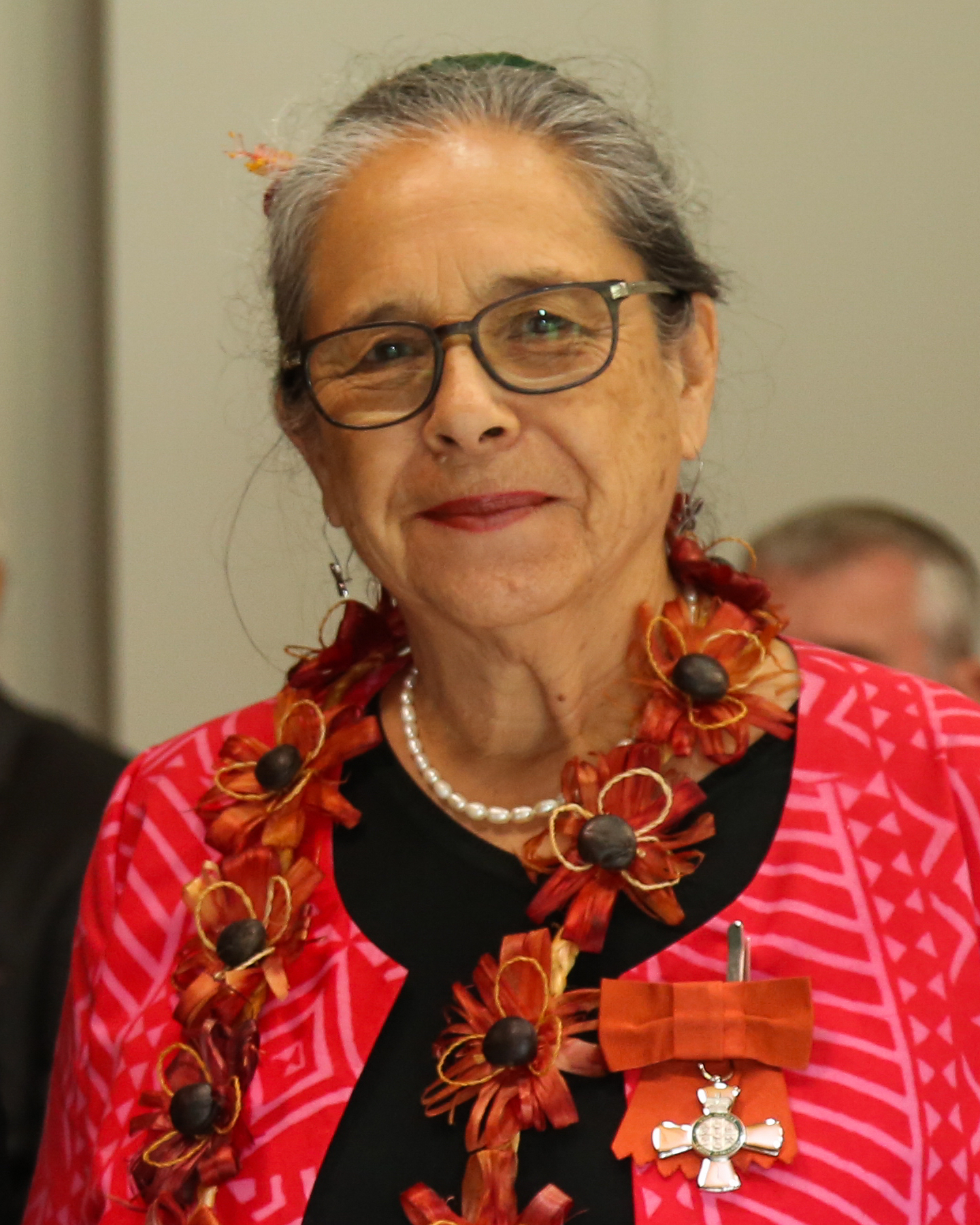
- Kohlhase in 2023
- Born: 1953 (age 71–72); Auckland, New Zealand
- Education: University of Waikato
- Occupation(s): Curator, arts administrator
- Known for: Promoting the work of artists and art from the Pacific Region

Marilyn Rhonda Kohlhase MNZM (born 1953) is a New Zealand arts curator and administrator, specialising in Pacific Islands art. She has worked with Auckland War Memorial Museum and Creative New Zealand. Kohlhase set up the first uniquely pan-Pacific art gallery and is known as the "art lady" in some circles.

== Biography ==
Kohlhase was born in Auckland, and is of German and Samoan heritage. As she was growing up, she attended Glenbrae Primary School and Glen Innes Intermediate, and then secondary school at Tamaki College. She went to study at the University of Waikato.

She was involved with the Socialist Unity Party, and worked for the Centre of Continuing Education at Auckland University in the 1980s and the Council of Organisations for Relief Service Overseas (CORSO).

As an arts administrator, Kohlhase has been on Auckland War Memorial Museum’s Pacific advisory group and the Museums Aotearoa board, leaving in 2018. While Kohlhase was chair of the Pacific Advisory Group, she expressed in a 2014 interview:

"Including Melanesians in the story is part of my agenda. I am a very proud Samoan, yet I am a middle-class internationalist with German heritage."

When she left the museum's Pacific Advisory Group, she joined the Auckland Museum Institute Council as a member so she could continue to promote a Pacific focus. Kohlhase was also for several years on arts boards at Creative New Zealand, including being the chair of the Pacific Arts Committee.

In 2007, Kohlhase co-founded with Bridget Marsh a pan-Pacific art gallery, Okaioceanikart, on Karangahape Road, Auckland, after an invitation from artist Fatu Feu'u. Kohlhase at the time has worked with Creative New Zealand and Bridget as mentor in business. The gallery, which represented exclusively contemporary artists of the Pacific and Oceania, is believed to be the first gallery in the world to have this focus. Okaioceanikart gallery closed in 2013. Kohlhase also opened Okai@Reef Gallery with a similar purpose. Kohlhase is known by some as the "art lady".

Some of the artists represented or exhibited by Okaioceanikart include Dagmar Dyck, Leua Latai Leonard, Sylvia Marsters, Abraham Lagi, Daniel Waswas, Kopotama Jacobsen, Dan Taulapapa McMullin, Sekio Fuapopo, Brian Feni and Sina Panama.

As a curator, Kohlhase is linked with decolonising art histories alongside others such as Caroline Vercoe, Lisa Taouma, Fulimalo Pereira, Sean Mallon, Ngahuia Te Awekotuku, Deidre Brown and Teresia Teaiwa (1968–2017).

Her interviews are held in National Library of New Zealand.

In the 2023 New Year Honours, Kohlhase was appointed a Member of the New Zealand Order of Merit, for services to Pacific arts and education.
