= Okaioceanikart =

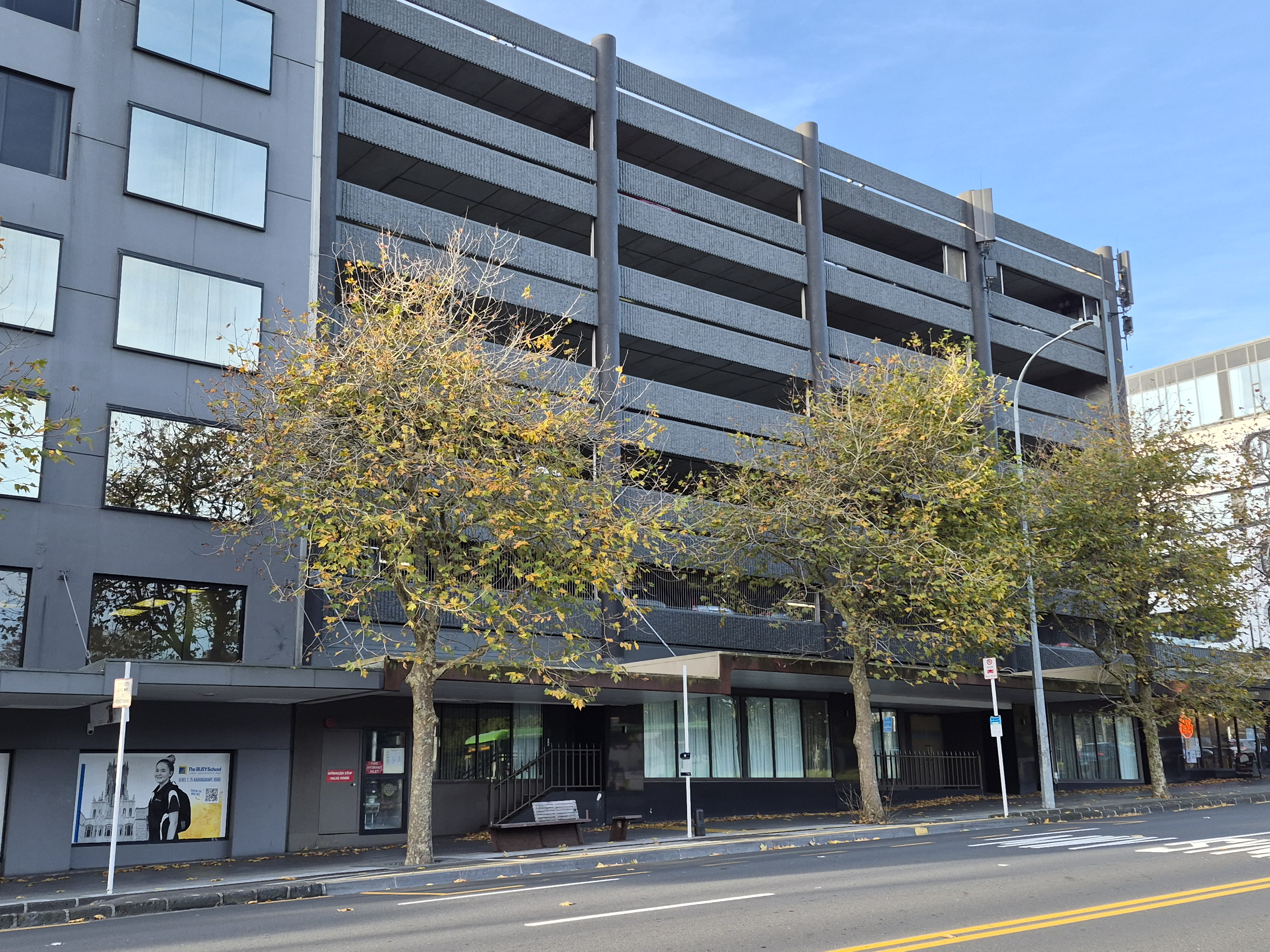
- 37 Karangahape Road, the former first location of Okaioceanikart (far right of building)
- Interactive map of the Okaioceanikart area
- Alternative names: Okai

General information
- Location: 65 Karangahape Road, Auckland, New Zealand
- Coordinates: 36.85801°S 174.76296°E

Okaioceanikart, also known as Okai, was a pan-Pacific commercial art gallery based in what was Langham Hotel Mall, situated on Karangahape Road, Auckland, New Zealand. The name Okaioceanikart combined ideas of kai (food) for the soul, kart (internet shopping), as well as art, ocean and kairos, the Greek concept of time and space.

Some of the artists represented or exhibited by Okaioceanikart include Fatu Feu'u, Dagmar Dyck, Leua Latai Leonard, Sylvia Marsters, Abraham Lagi, Daniel Waswas, Kopotama Jacobsen, Dan Taulapapa McMullin, Sekio Fuapopo, Brian Feni and Sina Panama.

== History ==
In 2007, Marilyn Kohlhase co-founded Okaioceanikart with Bridget Marsh a pan-Pacific art gallery, on Karangahape Road, Auckland, after an invitation from artist Fatu Feu'u. Kohlhase at the time has worked with Creative New Zealand and Bridget as a mentor in business.

The gallery, which represented exclusively contemporary artists of the Pacific and Oceania, is believed to be the first gallery in the world to have this focus, the gallery also has a strong focus on Polynesian and Melanesian cultural heritages.

Kohlhase also opened Okai@Reef Gallery with a similar purpose. Kohlhase is known by some as the "art lady". Okaioceanikart closed in 2013.
