= Tuāfale Tanoaʻi =

New Zealand artist

Tuāfale Tanoa’i AKA Linda T is a DJ, photographer, documentary maker and performance video installation artist from New Zealand. She is often known as DJ Linda T. Through her art she documents Māori, Pasifika and LGBTQI+ communities, of which she belongs to.

== Early life and education ==
Tanoa'i grew up in Kingsland, Auckland. Her parents were both migrants to New Zealand from Samoa. Tanoa'i is Samoan.

Tanoa'i has a Masters in Art and Design from Auckland University of Technology (AUT) with First Class Honours. Her exegesis was called Storytelling as koha: consolidating community memories.

== Career ==
Tanoa'i has worked in local radio, TV and on short films. Since the early 1980s Tanoa'i has been documenting small communities in New Zealand. An exhibition in 2018 called Storytelling as koha: consolidating community memories based on her university Masters at Corbans Estate Arts Centre in Henderson, Auckland, presented decades of work and the installation was described as a living archive. Tanoa'i said of her work, "What I do is unique, I'm not into capitalism or mainstream movie-making. Much of the work I do I gift back to the communities that feature in the works."

Tanoa'i was a founding member of D.A.N.C.E. Art Club (Distinguished All Night Community Entertainers Art Club) formed in 2008 while she was studying. Other founders were Ahilapalapa Rands, Vailmaila Urale and Chris Fitzgerald. They created events to disrupt what 'fine arts' was presented as, events included pool nights and a radio station. One event was a 'noho' (a group stay-in event) to bring together collaborative and collective artists indigenous to the Pacific Islands. Groups included Mata Aho Collective, FAFSWAG, Oceania Interrupted, SaVAge Klub and others. One of the projects was an exhibition called Welcome curated by Ahilapalapa Rands and it included a Guinness World Record attempt to hold the longest DJing marathon in a public space. Tanoa'i was the DJ, and the event went for three days but did not break the record.

An ongoing installation artwork from Tanoa'i is titled LTTV (2009-). Arts-writer Iona Gordon-Smith describes viewers of the exhibition being invited on-stage and their interviews become part of the exhibition.

Tanoa'i was the 2019 Pacific Artist in Residence at the University of Canterbury supported by Creative New Zealand and the Macmillan Brown Centre for Pacific Studies. During the residency she presented work at the Physics Room. It was called, Spontaneous Intentionality.

The group exhibition at Dunedin Public Art Gallery From the Shore (2021) included work by Tanoa'i, reference points for the art was from Mereta Mita and Barry Barclay. Tanoa'i presented LTTV (2009-) and participants spoke about Mita and Barclay.

In 2017 and 2020 Tanoa'i was programmed as a DJ in Music In The Square, at Aotea Square, Auckland. In 2020 Tanoa'i created a documentary about a month travelling in the USA watching female musicians called Chasing Chaka 2018: A Healing Adventure. Tanoa'i was on a NZ On Air Music panel in 2022 selecting NewMusic Pasifika recipients.

== Awards ==
In 2008 Tanoa'i received the Emerging Pacific Artist award at the Creative New Zealand Arts Pasifika Awards.
