= Fatu Feu'u =

New Zealand artist

Fatu Feu'u ONZM
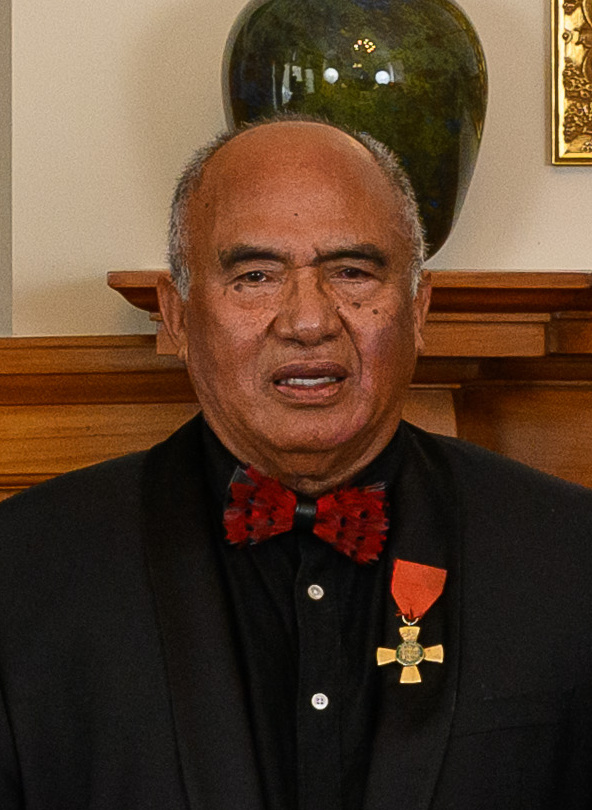
- Feu'u in 2022
- Born: Fatu Akelei Feu'u; 1946 (age 79–80); Poutasi, Western Samoa
- Known for: painting, sculpture

Fatu Akelei Feu'u ONZM (born 1946) is a noted Samoan painter from the village of Poutasi in the district of Falealili in Samoa. He has established a reputation as the elder statesman of Pacific art in New Zealand.

== Biography ==
Feu'u emigrated to New Zealand in 1966 after growing up in the village of Poutasi, Western Samoa. He always wanted to be an artist and noted the difference of how art was viewed between Samoa and New Zealand, with 'beautifully made, functional canoes and houses' being art in Samoa and in New Zealand art was 'something extra special not to be touched'.

Feu'u has been an exhibiting artist since the early 1980s and became a full-time artist in 1988, prior to that he worked as a designer and colour advisor for textile and car companies. He was influenced and mentored by artists Tony Fomison, Pat Hanly and Philip Clairmont.

In 1995 he became the first artist of Pacific heritage awarded the James Wallace Art Award. He was appointed an Honorary Officer of the New Zealand Order of Merit in the 2001 New Year Honours. In 2022 he received the Senior Pacific Artist Award at the Creative New Zealand Arts Pasifika Awards. Feu'u is 'pivotal in shaping the interest in contemporary Pacific art globally and nurturing a generation of Pacific artists locally'. Artist Dagmar Dyck recalls the influence he made on her in as he invited her into a Pasfika artist community near the end of her studies in 1993 at Elam art school in Auckland.

This act of recruitment, mentorship and collectivism was typical of the early beginnings of Fatu’s vision for contemporary Pacific arts. (Dagmar Dyck)

== Creative work ==
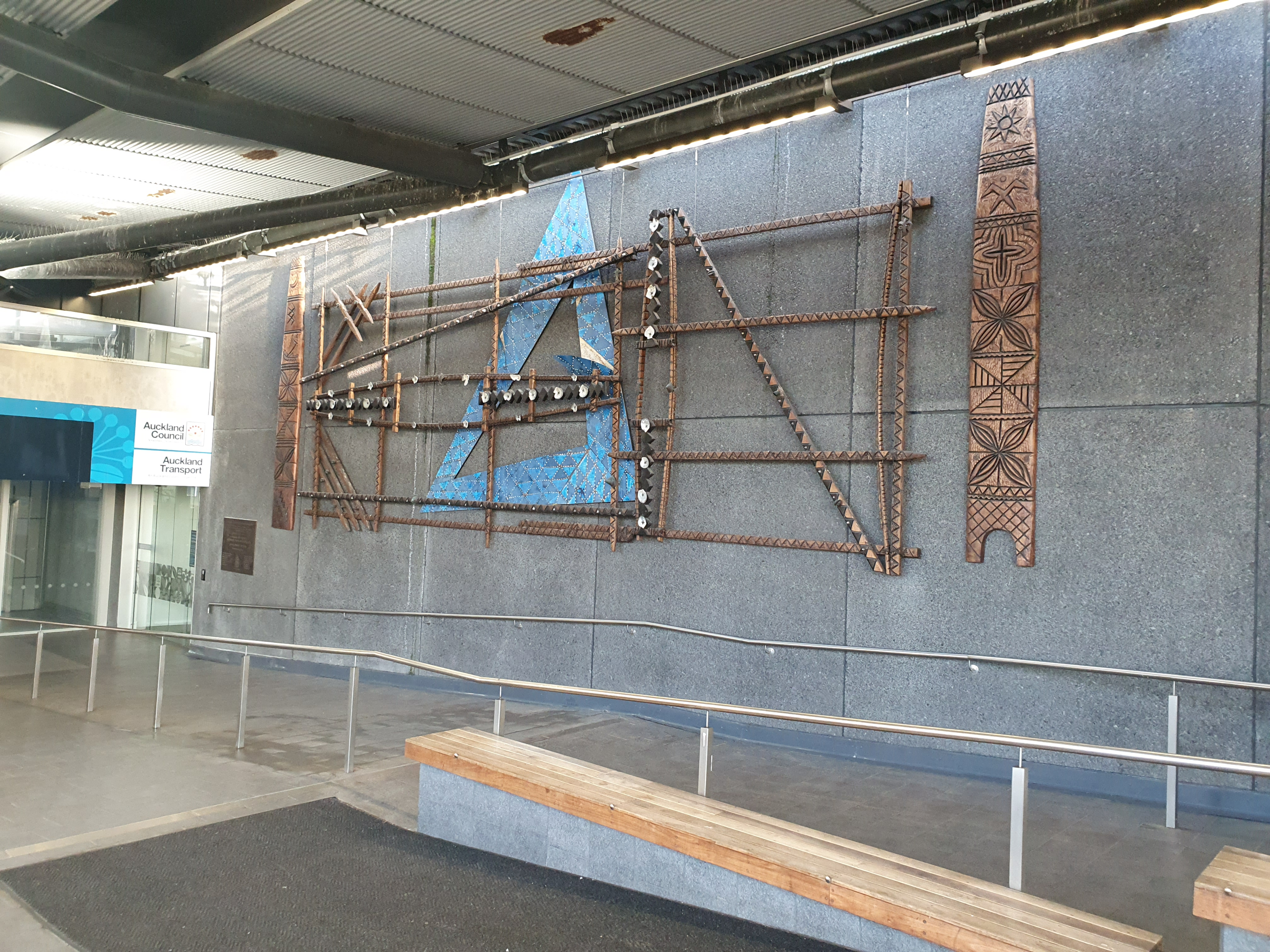
Folau (2009), a sculpture created for the Waitakere City Council civic centre on the Henderson railway station over-bridge in West Auckland

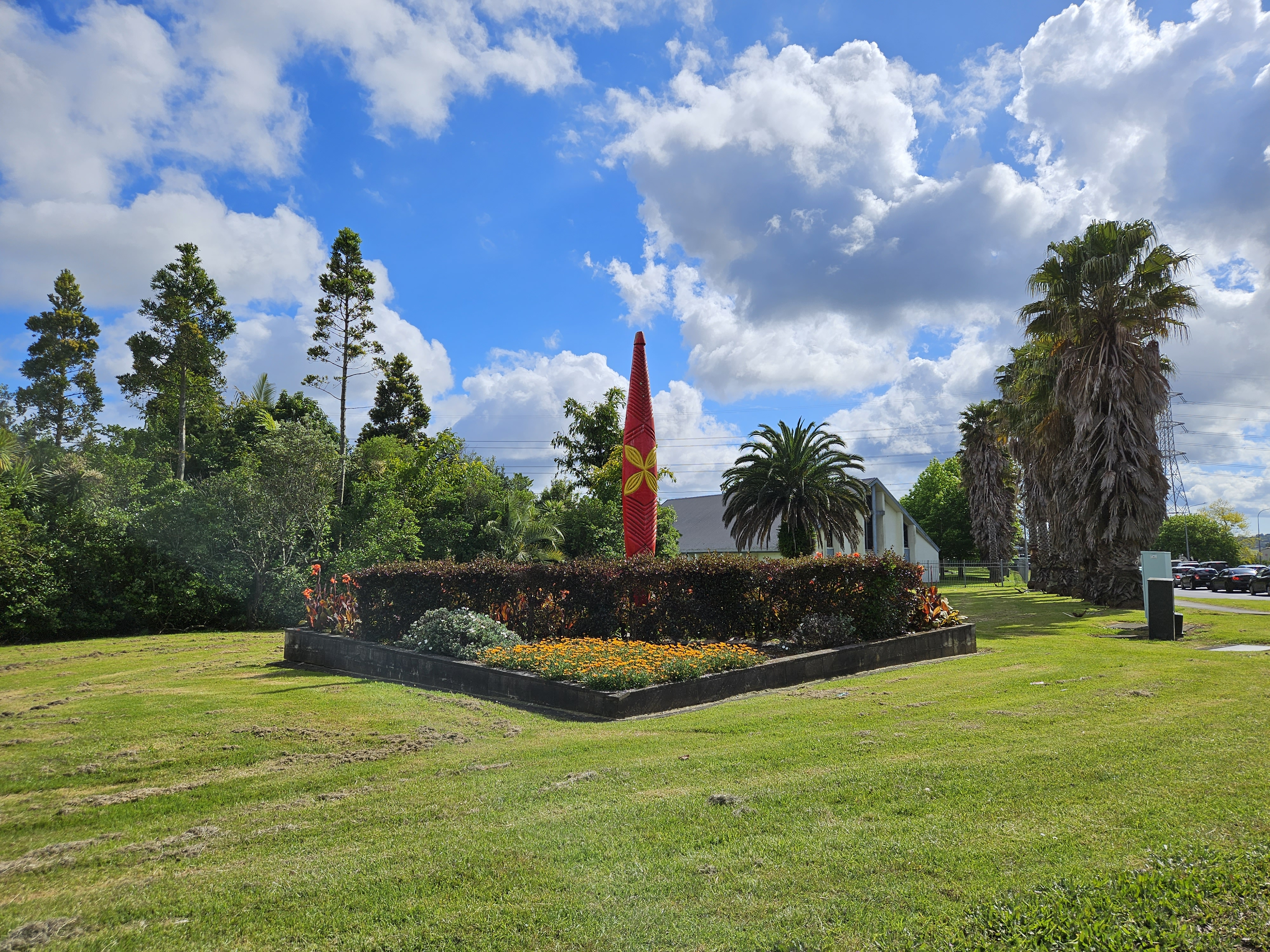
Feu'u's Untitled sculpture (2009) that welcomes people to Ōtara

=== Exhibitions ===
Feu'u has exhibited in numerous exhibitions in New Zealand and internationally with works in national and private collections worldwide. He has exhibited in solo and major group exhibitions including Samoa Contemporary (2008) at Pataka Art + Museum in Porirua, and Fa'atasi (2022) at Bergman Gallery in Rarotonga, Cook Islands.

Feu'u's work was included in two groundbreaking exhibitions of contemporary Pacific art: Te Moemoea no Iotefa, curated by Rangihiroa Panaho for the Sarjeant Art Gallery in 1990 and Bottled Ocean curated by Jim Viviaeare, which toured New Zealand in 1994–1995.

In 2007, Marilyn Kohlhase co-founded with Bridget Marsh a pan-Pacific art gallery, Okaioceanikart, on Karangahape Road, Auckland, after an invitation from Feu'u. Okaioceanikart continued to exhibit Feu'u until it closed in 2013.

Feu'u was part of the major group exhibition Le Folauga: the past coming forward – Contemporary Pacific Art from Aotearoa New Zealand, at the Auckland Museum. Le Folauga later toured to Taiwan and became the first exhibition of contemporary Pacific art from New Zealand to be shown in a major fine arts museum in Asia. Le Folauga opened at the Kaohsiung Museum of Fine Arts in Taiwan from 13 December 2008 to 5 April 2009.

Feu'u collaborated with Mahiriki Tangaroa in 2024 in an exhibition named Aro'a Alofa in Bergman Gallery, Rarotonga, Cook Islands. Feu'u explained the exhibition is a way of giving back to the Cook Islands and the friends who supported his career, as well as reconnecting with the local community.

=== Collections ===
Feu'u's work is included in a number of prestigious national and international collections including the National Gallery, Brisbane; Auckland Art Gallery; Museum of New Zealand Te Papa Tongarewa, Wellington and Waikato Museum of Art and History, Hamilton. His work is also included in an extensive number of private collections in New Zealand, Australia, United States of America, England, Holland, American Samoa, Samoa and Japan.

Inside the New Zealand Parliament, the entrance to The Pacific Room is designed by Ian George, and the wooden carving was carved by four carvers from the South Pacific, Ian George from Cook Islands, Fatu Feu'u from Samoa, Filipe Tohi from Tonga, and Palalagi Manetoa from Niue, about how Pacific peoples from those islands came to New Zealand and made the new country home.

=== Public artworks ===
Two large wood and paint sculptures are found in Auckland. Ole Alia outside the Massey Library and Leisure Centre and Unititled marks the entrance to the South Auckland suburb of Ōtara. Feu'u was commissioned in 2007 by the Waitakere City Council to create an artwork representing the Pasifika community of West Auckland. The artwork spent 12 months to create, and was unveiled at the Henderson railway station over-bridge in 2009.

=== Artistic mediums ===
While primarily a painter, Feu'u explores a range of other mediums including bronze, wood and stone sculpture, pottery design, lithographs, woodcuts and glass works (both stained and etched).

=== Polynesian influences ===
Feu'u's work is inspired by Polynesian art forms such as siapo (tapa cloth), tatau (tattoo), weaving, carving and ceremonial mask making. In these forms he uses a rich lexicon of motifs and compositional structures. His works frequently blend traditional and contemporary elements, incorporating a range of influences, inspirations, techniques and motifs from Samoa and Aotearoa and more generally from Euro-American to Pacific cultures.

=== Fa'asamoa ===
Fa'asamoa is the unifying element of Feu'u's work. The term fa'asamoa is generally defined as 'the Samoan way'. The social structure of Samoan society is held together and actively maintained by an adherence to unwritten but understood cultural conventions embodied in fa'asamoa which binds family networks to traditional customs and ceremonies.

== Tautai Pacific Arts Trust ==
Tautai Pacific Arts Trust, an organisation of contemporary Pacific artists in New Zealand, was founded in the 1980s as an informal network from an initiative by Feu'u and artist friends. This group shared a goal of mutual support for the promotion of Pacific visual art artists, at a time when Pacific art was in the very early stages of recognition as a particular genre. In 2005, Tautai celebrated its 10th anniversary as a formalised organisation. Members include other established Pacific artists such as painter and sculptor Johnny Penisula, multi-media artist Shigeyuki Kihara and Michel Tuffery. By 2022 the Tautai Pacific Arts Trust is considered a leading Pacific arts organisation, the director is Aanoalii Rowena Fuluifaga and the premises are on Karangahape Road in Auckland.

== New Zealand Arts Icon Award ==
In December 2022 Feu'u was a recipient of the New Zealand Arts Icon Award Whakamana Hiranga, which makes him one of twenty current living cultural icons.

== Named after Fatu Feu'u ==
In September 2022, Black Grace, a New Zealand contemporary dance company, performed a piece in United States, and New Zealand named Fatu (Heart), inspired by Feu’u.

In 2023, Fatu Feu’u Pacific Arts Prize, is a scholarship established in University of Auckland, funded by Felicity Barnes and Michael Whitehead, is named after Feu'u to recognise and honour his role as a leader in the Pacific arts community.
