= Electoral history of John Key =

List of elections featuring John Key as a candidate

This is a summary of the electoral history of John Key, Prime Minister of New Zealand (2008–2016), Leader of the National Party (2006–2016), and Member of Parliament for Helensville (2002–2017).

== History ==
Key had first decided to stand for National at the 2002 election in late 2001. He was then working at Merrill Lynch, an investment bank. Key decided to not stand on the list. One of the seats he considered standing in was Tamaki, but National officials convinced him not to stand, as Clem Simich—the Member of Parliament for Tamaki—had a good base in the electorate. Beverley Revell—a registered nurse—was Key's campaign manager. Key eventually chose Helensville to contest, against the unfavourably rated Brian Neeson. Many in National feared that Labour would take over the seat, and Key won the nomination 32–28. He also won the electorate at the 2002 election.

The 2005 election showed close results heading in with Don Brash as its leader, with Labour winning 48-50 seatwise, while also having large political party support. Brash later revealed in his autobiography that he never intended to spend a full term as prime minister, and would give the position over to Key. Key later deposed Brash from leader position after the 2005 election, in 2006.

== Parliamentary elections ==
=== 2002 election ===
General election, 2002: Helensville
Notes:	Blue background denotes the winner of the electorate vote. Pink background denotes a candidate elected from their party list. Yellow background denotes an electorate win by a list member, or other incumbent. A ✓ or ✗ denotes status of any incumbent, win or lose respectively.						
Party	Candidate	Votes	%	±%	Party votes	%	±%
National	John Key	9,775	34.18		7,524	25.81	
Labour	Gary Russell	8,070	28.21		8,988	30.83	
Independent	Brian Neeson	5,644	19.73				
NZ First	Dail Jones	2,725	9.53		3,481	11.94	
United Future New Zealand	Andrea Deeth	1,184	4.14		2,416	8.29	
Alliance	Helen MacKinlay	581	2.03		299	1.03	
Christian Heritage	David Simpkin	350	1.22		288	0.99	
Progressive	Clare Dickson	273	0.95		272	0.93	
ACT					3,676	12.61	
Green					1,755	6.02	
ORNZ					313	1.07	
Legalise Cannabis					118	0.40	
One NZ					15	0.05	
Mana Māori					10	0.03	
NMP					2	0.01	
Informal votes		327			78		
Total valid votes		28,602			29,157		
Turnout		29,428	79.64				
National win new seat	Majority	1,705	5.96				

=== 2005 election ===
General election, 2005: Helensville
Notes:	Blue background denotes the winner of the electorate vote. Pink background denotes a candidate elected from their party list. Yellow background denotes an electorate win by a list member, or other incumbent. A ✓ or ✗ denotes status of any incumbent, win or lose respectively.						
Party	Candidate	Votes	%	±%	Party votes	%	±%
National	✓ John Key	22,008	64.10	+29.92	19,224	55.09	+29.28
Labour	Judy Lawley	9,230	26.88	−0.24	9,761	27.97	−2.86
NZ First	Dail Jones	1,400	4.08	−5.45	2,051	5.88	−6.06
United Future New Zealand	Andrea Deeth	573	1.67	−2.47	863	2.47	−5.82
ACT	Stephen Langford-Tebby	389	1.13		821	2.35	−10.26
Māori Party	Awa Hudson	359	1.05		142	0.41	
Progressive	Julian Aaron	318	0.93	−0.02	218	0.81	−0.08
Green	Helen Koster	58	0.17		1,407	4.03	−1.99
Destiny					151	0.43	
Legalise Cannabis					66	0.19	−0.21
Christian Heritage					48	0.14	−0.85
Libertarianz					16	0.05	
Direct Democracy					11	0.03	
Alliance					9	0.03	−1.00
Democrats					8	0.02	
Family Rights					8	0.02	
99 MP					5	0.01	
RONZ					5	0.01	
One NZ					4	0.01	−0.04
Informal votes		253			110		
Total valid votes		34,335			34,896		
Turnout		35,222	82.85	+3.21			
National hold	Majority	12,778	37.22	+31.26			

=== 2008 election ===
General election, 2008: Helensville
Notes:	Blue background denotes the winner of the electorate vote. Pink background denotes a candidate elected from their party list. Yellow background denotes an electorate win by a list member, or other incumbent. A ✓ or ✗ denotes status of any incumbent, win or lose respectively.						
Party	Candidate	Votes	%	±%	Party votes	%	±%
National	✓ John Key	26,771	73.61	+9.51	23,559	63.69	+8.60
Labour	Darien Fenton	6,224	17.11	−9.77	6,826	18.45	−9.52
Green	David Clendon	2,166	5.96	+5.79	1,814	4.90	+0.87
ACT	David Garrett	811	2.23	+1.10	2,481	6.71	+4.36
United Future New Zealand	Angela Lovelock	309	0.85	−0.82	289	0.78	−1.69
Libertarianz	Peter Osborne	89	0.24		21	0.06	+0.01
NZ First					940	2.54	−3.34
Progressive					195	0.53	−0.28
Family Party					182	0.49	
Māori Party					182	0.49	+0.08
Bill and Ben					170	0.46	
Legalise Cannabis					131	0.35	+0.16
Kiwi					105	0.28	
Pacific					45	0.12	
Alliance					19	0.05	+0.02
Workers Party					9	0.02	
Democrats					8	0.02	±0.00
RAM					8	0.02	
RONZ					4	0.01	±0.00
Informal votes		251			110		
Total valid votes		36,370			36,988		
Turnout		37,298	82.27	−0.58			
National hold	Majority	20,547	56.49				

=== 2011 election ===
General election, 2011: Helensville
Notes:	Blue background denotes the winner of the electorate vote. Pink background denotes a candidate elected from their party list. Yellow background denotes an electorate win by a list member, or other incumbent. A ✓ or ✗ denotes status of any incumbent, win or lose respectively.						
Party	Candidate	Votes	%	±%	Party votes	%	±%
National	✓ John Key	26,011	74.38	+0.77	23,558	65.79	+2.09
Labour	Jeremy Greenbrook-Held	4,945	14.14	−2.97	5,138	14.35	−4.11
Green	Jeanette Elley	2,575	7.36	+1.41	3,094	8.64	+3.74
Conservative Party of New Zealand	Richard Drayson	941	2.69	+2.69	1,258	3.51	+3.51
Legalise Cannabis	Adrian McDermott	319	0.91	+0.91	174	0.49	+0.16
ACT	Nick Kearney	180	0.51	0−1.72	499	1.39	−5.31
NZ First					1,648	4.60	+2.06
Māori Party					186	0.52	+0.03
United Future New Zealand					163	0.46	−0.33
Mana					60	0.17	+0.17
Libertarianz					19	0.05	-0.004
Democrats					8	0.02	+0.001
Alliance					4	0.01	−0.04
Informal votes		574			198		
Total valid votes		34,971			35,809		
National hold	Majority	21,066	60.24	+3.74			

=== 2014 election ===
General election, 2014: Helensville
Notes:	Blue background denotes the winner of the electorate vote. Pink background denotes a candidate elected from their party list. Yellow background denotes an electorate win by a list member, or other incumbent. A ✓ or ✗ denotes status of any incumbent, win or lose respectively.						
Party	Candidate	Votes	%	±%	Party votes	%	±%
National	✓ John Key	22,720	65.17	−9.21	20,689	58.39	−7.40
Green	Kennedy Graham	4,433	12.72	+5.36	4,801	13.55	+4.91
Labour	Corie Haddock	4,425	12.69	−1.45	4,430	12.50	−1.85
Internet	Laila Harré	1,315	3.77	+3.77			
Conservative Party of New Zealand	Deborah Dougherty	963	2.76	−0.07	1,692	4.78	+1.27
Independent	Penny Bright	420	1.20	+1.20			
ACT	Phelan Pirrie	302	0.87	+0.36	262	0.74	−0.65
Independent	Brendan Whyte	74	0.21	+0.21			
NZ First					2,608	7.36	+2.76
Internet Mana					338	0.95	+0.78 (Note: 2014 Internet Mana swing is relative to the votes for Mana in 2011; it shared a party list with Internet in the 2014 election.)
Māori Party					192	0.54	+0.02
Legalise Cannabis					161	0.45	−0.04
United Future New Zealand					93	0.26	−0.20
Ban 1080					48	0.14	+0.14
Democrats					23	0.06	+0.04
Independent Coalition					13	0.04	+0.04
Civilian					8	0.02	+0.02
Focus					3	0.01	+0.01
Informal votes		208			73		
Total valid votes		34,860			35,434		
Turnout		35,507	82.29	+5.65			
National hold	Majority	18,287	52.46	−7.78			
