= Foreign Exchange Committee =

Foreign exchange traders industry group

The Foreign Exchange Committee, founded in 1978, is an industry group that provides guidance and leadership to the global foreign exchange market. The FXC includes representatives of major financial institutions engaged in foreign currency trading in the United States and is sponsored by the Federal Reserve Bank of New York. Aware of the strong integration of the global foreign exchange market, the FXC is also an active partner to other foreign exchange committees and industry associations worldwide.

== Objectives ==
The FXC's objectives include:

- serving as a forum for the discussion of good practices and technical issues in the FX market,
- fostering improvements in risk management in the FX market by offering recommendations and guidelines, and
- supporting actions that facilitate greater contractual certainties for all parties active in foreign exchange.

== Management ==
Foreign Exchange Committee is managed by a Committee of maximum 35 members. Members are chosen based upon stature within their companies as well as within the marketplace. As of 2013, the committee has members from companies such as Goldman Sachs, Citigroup and BlackRock. Past Committee members were John Spurdle of J.P. Morgan, Jeff Feig of Citigroup, Lloyd Blankfein of Goldman Sachs, Paul Kimball of Morgan Stanley, Michael deSa of Deutsche Bank, Robert Savage of American Express, Mark De Gennaro of Lehman Brothers, and John Key, the former Prime Minister of New Zealand.
