= Poutasi =

Village in Upolu, Samoa

Coordinates: 14°02′S 171°42′W

Poutasi is a village on the south east coast of Upolu island in Samoa. The population is 395. The village is part of Falealili Electoral Constituency (Faipule District) in the larger political district of Atua. Poutasi was extensively damaged by the 2009 Samoa earthquake and tsunami.

The artist Fatu Feu'u grew up in Poutasi. The historian Malama Meleisea is also from Poutasi.

== Sister cities ==
In May 2023 Poutasi signed a sister cities agreement with the Hastings District in New Zealand.
