= Malama Meleisea =

Samoan historian

Malama Meleisea is a Samoan historian and the author of several historical books on Samoa. He holds the Samoan title Leasiolagi.

Meleisea is from Poutasi in Falealili. He worked as a teacher before studying at the University of Papua New Guinea and Australian National University. He holds a Phd in History and Politics from Macquarie University in Sydney, Australia. In 1978 he became a lecturer at the University of the South Pacific. He was the founding director of Macmillan Brown Centre for Pacific Studies at Canterbury University and director at Centre for Pacific Studies at Auckland University, New Zealand.

In 2007, he was appointed UNESCO director in Bangladesh. Between 2011 and 2012 he served as a judge on the Land and Titles Court of Samoa. In 2016 he was appointed as one of the commissioners for a commission of inquiry into domestic violence in Samoa.

Dr Meleisea was the Director of Samoan Studies at the National University of Samoa, until 2022.

== Selected bibliography ==
- Meleisea, Malama (1987). The making of modern Samoa : traditional authority and colonial administration in the history of Western Samoa. [Suva, Fiji]: Institute of Pacific Studies of the University of the South Pacific. ISBN 9820200318. OCLC 19102181.
- Meleisea, Malama (1992). Change and adaptations in Western Samoa. Christchurch: Macmillan Brown Centre for Pacific Studies.
- Meleisea, Malama; Meleisea, Penelope Schoeffel; Meleisea, Ellie (2012). Samoa's journey, 1962-2012 : aspects of history. Wellington: Victoria University Press.
