= Dagmar Dyck =

New Zealand artist

- Born: 1972 (age 53–54); Auckland, New Zealand
- Education: Elam School of Fine Arts
- Alma mater: Victoria University of Wellington
- Known for: Prints, Paintings

Dagmar Vaikalafi Dyck (born 1972) is a New Zealand artist of Tongan and German descent. Dyck's prints and paintings are often inspired by her cultural heritage and explore textile practices of Tonga. In 2012, Dyck was co-curator of No'o fakataha, a group exhibition of Tongan artists. Dyck's inspirations come from Tonga’s textiles arts, which includes bark cloth, mats, baskets and clothes.

== Education ==
Dyck completed a Bachelor for Fine Arts through Elam School of Fine Arts in 1994 and a Post-Graduate Diploma of Fine Arts in 1995. She was the first women of Tongan descent to do so. In 2009, Dyck graduated with a Graduate Diploma in teaching (Primary) from Victoria University of Wellington. She teaches art at Sylvia Park School in Mt Wellington, Auckland.

== Awards and honors ==
In 2017 Dyck was selected for inclusion in an artist research role in the Ancient Futures Marsden Project to Europe in 2018.

In 2014 Dyck received the Contemporary Artist Award at the Creative New Zealand Arts Pasifika Awards.

In 2002 Dyck was a finalist for the Wallace Art Awards.

== Selected exhibitions ==
- 2017 un/trained thoughts, Warwick Henderson Gallery, Newmarket Auckland
- 2014 Tonga 'i Onopooni: Tonga Contemporary, Pataka Art + Museum, Porirua Wellington
- 2013. Pacific Voices II, Orexart Auckland.
- 2013. To Be Pacific, Tairawhiti Museum + Art Gallery Gisborne.
- 2013 Pacifica: Patterns of Exchange. Flagstaff Gallery Auckland with Sheyne Tuffery
- 2013 Made in Oceania, Tapa Art + Landscapes, Rautenstrauch-Joest Museum, Cologne
- 2013 Between the Lines, Solander Gallery Wellington,
- 2012. Made in New Zealand: An exhibition of Fine Art from New Zealand. Agora Gallery, New York, USA.
- 2009. HAERE MAI I OKAI, Okaioceanikart, Auckland, New Zealand
