= Veiqia =

Female tattoo practice in Fiji

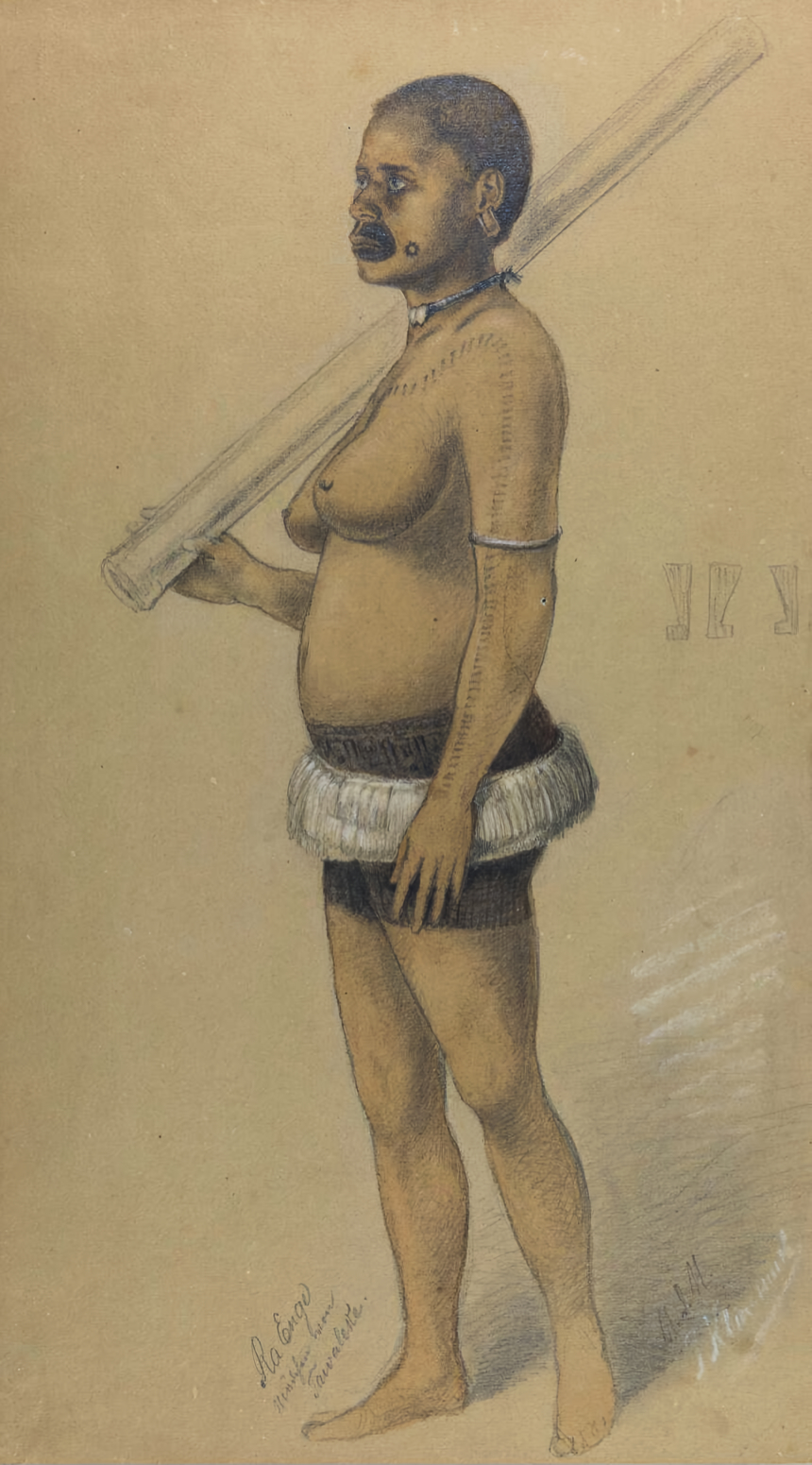
Ra enge, Fijian noblewoman, tattooed with veiqia (hips, buttocks and upper thighs) and qia gusu (mouth), by Theodor Kleinschmidt

Veiqia (Fijian pronunciation: [βɛi̯ᵑɡia]), or Weniqia, is a female tattooing practice in Fiji. The term refers to both the practice and to the tattoos. Women or adolescent girls who have reached puberty may be tattooed in the groin and buttocks area by older female tattooing specialists called dauveiqia or daubati. The practice was common prior to the arrival in the 1830s of Christian missionaries who discouraged it. The practice declined in the late nineteenth century, so that by 1908 to 1910, there was a single remaining tattooist recorded as being active; she was called Rabali. The practice was revived in the twenty-first century, led by the work of a collective of artists known as The Veiqia Project. Museum collections of veiqia artefacts are found in several Western museum collections, as well as the Fiji Museum.

In Fijian culture, the tattoos were considered to heighten a woman's beauty. Veiqia were seen as attractive and could be an important factor that enabled a woman to marry. If she died without them, they would be painted on her body after death so her spirit could proceed into the afterlife. Receiving veiqia was highly ritualised, with many regional variations. Preparation for the process could include abstinence from food or from sexual relations, or inducing vomiting to purge the body. The process of tattooing was closely associated with the gift of a young woman's first liku (fringed skirt) to wear once her veiqia was complete.

Special caves called qara ni veiqia were historically used for the ritual. Traditional medicines given to the young women varied from region to region and some were part of preparation for the ritual. To break the skin, some tools used included stingray spines, lemon thorns or shark teeth. Inks were made from Acacia richii or kauri pine. Motifs for tattoos included: turtles and wandering tattlers, pottery and basketwork. The tattooists, known as dauveiqia (also daubati) exchanged the service for masi (barkcloth), tabua (polished sperm whale teeth) or liku.

== Description ==
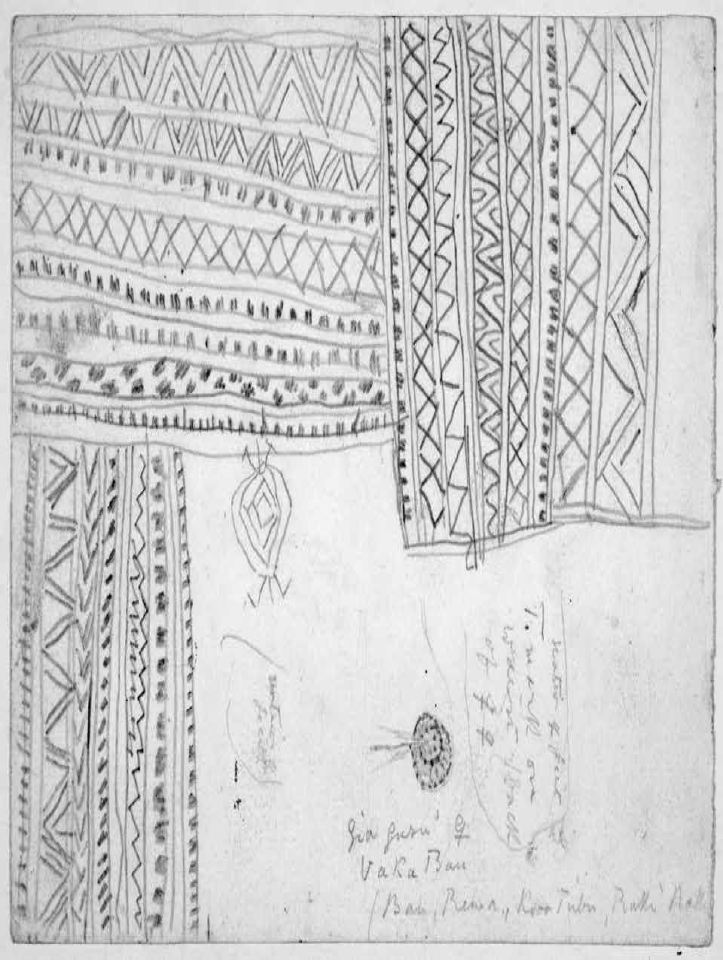
Veiqia design (complete), 1876

Veiqia (also referred to as weniqia) is a traditional form of tattooing that was exclusive to women in Fiji. The term can refer both to the practice and to the tattoos themselves. Kingsley Roth, a British colonial administrator, described in his 1933 publication that veiqia was marked onto young women's bodies at the time of puberty or sometimes at the onset of menstruation. The practice demonstrated that the women were available for marriage and had physically reached sexual maturity. Typically, young women would receive veiqia in the groin and on the buttocks. These areas would normally be covered by a liku (fringed skirt).

Veiqia practices varied regionally. Marking the pubic area was recorded from the village of Nabukeru, on the island of Yasawa. In the areas of Ba and Rewa, the veiqia was limited to only the area covered by a liku, whereas in the highlands of Viti Levu (the principal island) the veiqia extended to the hips, so the marks would be seen above and below the liku. The whole ritual was closely linked to puberty and coming of age and it was only after tattooing that young women were permitted to wear a liku. Designs were also made around women's mouths known as qia gusu – but rather than marking transition out of puberty, they were made to mark subsequent stages in a woman's life, such as marriage or childbirth, although accounts of when it was performed contradict one another.

Motifs included in the tattoo designs were based on a range of patterns, reflecting the natural environment and culture. Notes made by Austrian anthropologist Anatole von Hügel describe the motifs in use in one specific region – Viti Levu Bay – in the mid-to-late-nineteenth century. There is no record of designs used in other regions. They included: stars, boats, turtles, ducks, wandering tattlers, pottery and basketwork, and leprosy marks, among others. They were similar to those printed onto Fijian barkcloth or incised onto decorated weapons, such as war clubs.

According to the Scottish writer Constance Gordon-Cumming, there were differences in patterns between coastal and inland communities, the patterns becoming more elaborate inland. The extent to which a woman was tattooed also varied: Gordon-Cumming reported that women at the coast only had "an exceedingly small display of tattooing", by which she meant the women had the least amount that was appropriate for their culture.

== Ritual ==
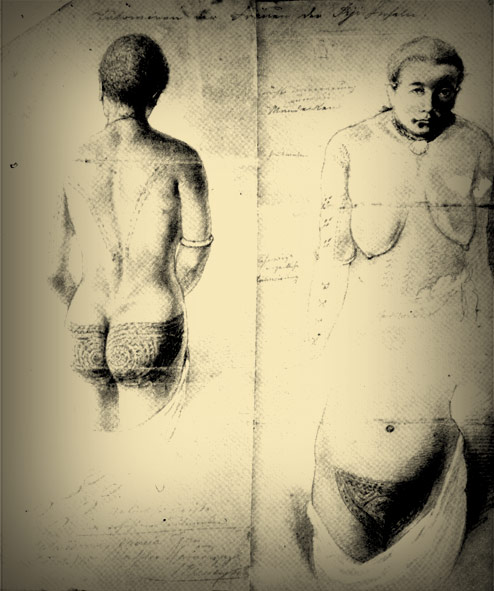
Drawings of veiqia by Theodor Kleinschmidt

The tattooists are called dauveiqia or daubati. Historically they were older women, and their expertise in creating the tattoos was held in high regard in Fijian society. One of the last traditional dauveiqia was a woman named Rabali, who was tattooing women between 1908 and 1910. The young woman due to be tattooed had to give the dauveiqia in masi (tapa cloth), tabua (polished sperm whale teeth) or liku for the service. Although there was usually one older woman applying the tattoos, other women might be present to hold the young woman still. The ways in which dauveiqia worked varied. For example, in the Wailevu river region, one specialist tattooed all the women, and she was a member of a named clan (the maitaisu). Beyond Wailevu it is not known if clan affiliation was important for all the practitioners, as this evidence is not recorded for other regions.

Preparations for veiqia varied among regions and were highly ritualised. No preparation was undertaken prior to tattooing by people living next to the Wainimala river, according to Kingsley Roth in 1933. In contrast, in Noiemalu district the pelvic areas due to be tattooed were rested for three days beforehand. This involved the young woman moving gently during her daily tasks, and lying with her legs raised to sleep. The skin was then massaged prior to marking. In another example, young women in Naboubuco who were to receive veiqia could not be menstruating and had to fast for 24 hours in advance of the procedure. During that fast, they also spent a night fishing for freshwater shrimp, which they ate to break their fast. They were also required to bring their own lemon thorns to make the tattooing implements. In Tailevu, young women had to rest for four days with their legs elevated, were given plant medicines made from the Rewa tree (Cerbera manghas) and a leafy green called Boro (Solanum viride) to make them purge, then given coconut milk. On the day of the ritual Tailevu young women were fed food to constipate them, such as yam. The tattoo practitioners also had to refrain from sexual relations for one day prior to their work.

The ritual of applying the tattoos was historically conducted in special caves called qara ni veiqia. At least one of these sites is still known at Yaro village on Kia Island. The process could take several weeks, or even months, since it was extremely painful and skin required time to heal between sessions. Pubic tattoos were made first, followed by the hips and buttocks. Tattoos were not made all at once, with work occurring across three days, followed by a rest for the skin to heal, then a return to the ritual depending on how quickly the skin adapted and how much pain the young woman could tolerate.

Most often, four days after the veiqia was complete, there was a ceremonial feast. This was sometimes known as 'the shedding of the scales' and was when the scabs over the tattoos would come off and reveal the designs. It was at this feast where the newly tattooed woman was presented with her first liku and it was paid for by the family of the man she intended to marry.

== Implements ==
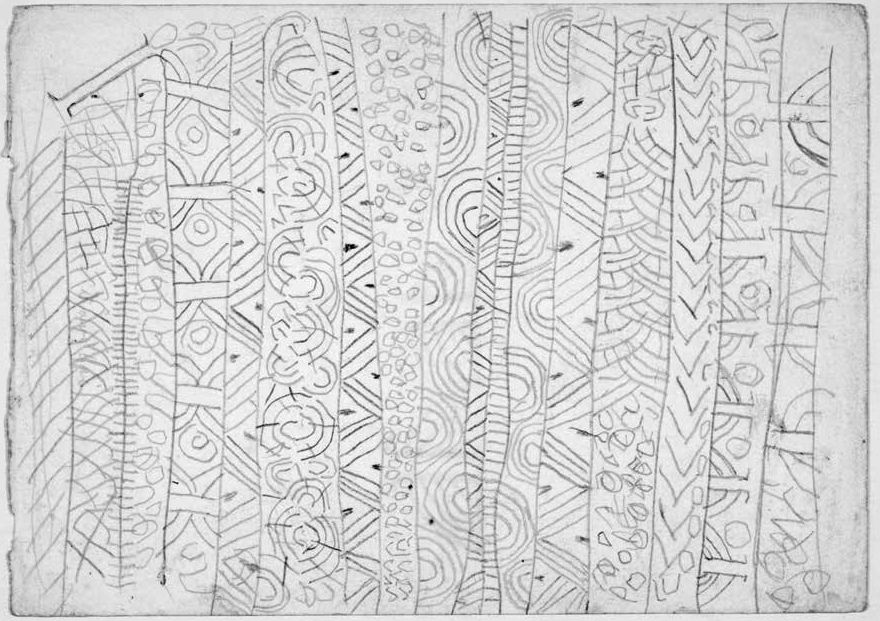
Veiqia design (complete), 1876

The implements used for veiqia showed regional variations. The tools could be shaped like a small adze and the blade was made from a lemon tree thorn. A wau (mallet) made from mbeta wood tapped the back of the bati, which punctured the skin. The handle for the bati was sometimes made from reed. In Lau, the jitolo (the local term for the bati) was made from hibiscus wood; these mallets could also be made from stingray tail spines. Other materials used to puncture the skin included barracuda or shark teeth, or a sharp-toothed comb made from bone or turtle shell.

In the district of the Wainimala River on Viti Levu, the skin was punctured and ink made from the Acacia richii was then rubbed into the wound. This was in contrast to other methods, where a blade was dipped in the ink. In Rewasau, the ink was made from the soot of the kauri pine. An ink made from soot from burnt candlenuts was reserved for women of high social status. Ink was also blessed with prayers to the gods prior to the process. Some dauveiqia, such as Rabali, used soot to sketch designs on the bodies prior to beginning to tattoo.

Tools were usually used for one specific woman's veiqia. Afterwards, for women in Viti Levu for example, they were given to the subject's mother, who kept them with other special objects from the young woman's childhood – such as her umbilical cord. For women from Vanua Levu, the masi (cloth used to wipe away blood and excess ink) was kept and then taken out to sea as part of a fishing trip and then thrown in the water. This was followed by a blessing usually given by the young woman's grandmother.

For qia gusu (mouth tattoos), an 1878 account on Viti Levu described how a woman's head was held still while lemon thorns fastened to a reed were used to incise either side of her mouth using an ink made from the gum of Agathis vitiensis. For some women in other areas of Fiji, such as Nagadi, women were tattooed all round their mouths, not just in the corners.

== Cultural significance ==
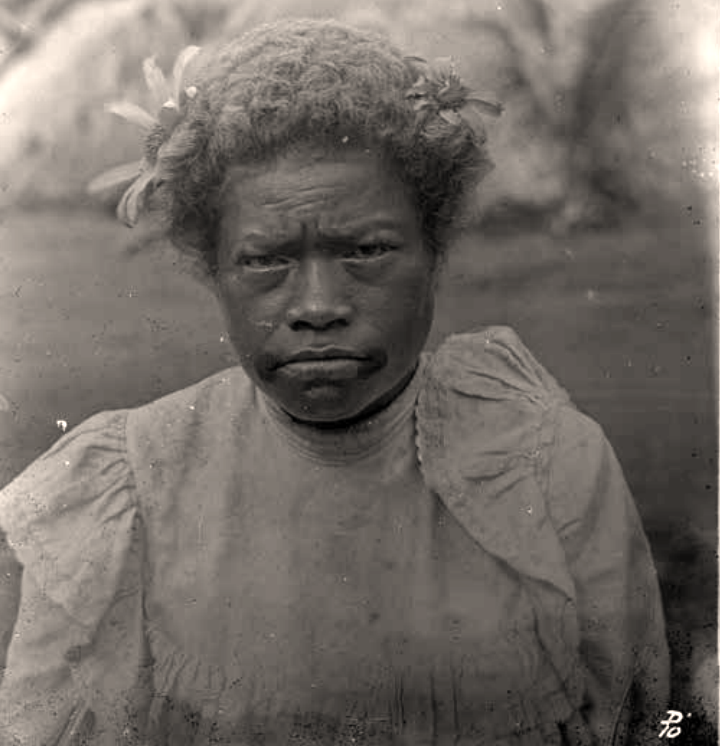
Unknown Fijian woman with qia gusu (mouth tattoos), Vanua Levu, 1910–12, by Arthur Maurice Hocart

In Fijian culture veiqia do not just symbolise a woman's maturity – whether at puberty, marriage or motherhood – but are also believed to enhance women's beauty. If a woman were to be untattooed, she would have been historically viewed by wider Fijian society as unusual, and might have been unable to find a husband. This view was described in 1908 by colonial administrator Basil Thomson who recorded comments by Vatureba (the chief of Nakasaleka on Viti Levu) that "the idea of marriage with an untattooed woman filled him with disgust". Vatureba also perceived women with tattoos as more sexually passionate. If a woman died who had not received veiqia, at burial her body was painted with the perceived missing designs so that she would not be punished in the afterlife.

The process of acquiring veiqia is painful, and the suffering the women underwent was important to the process. It was seen that toleration of the pain transformed the young women between life stages, and so veiqia were a source of pride for women. Both veiqia and qia gusu might be altered at other stages of women's lives, such as childbirth – the length of the liku would also be extended. Young women from chiefly families received veiqia and liku at an older age than young women from a lower social status.

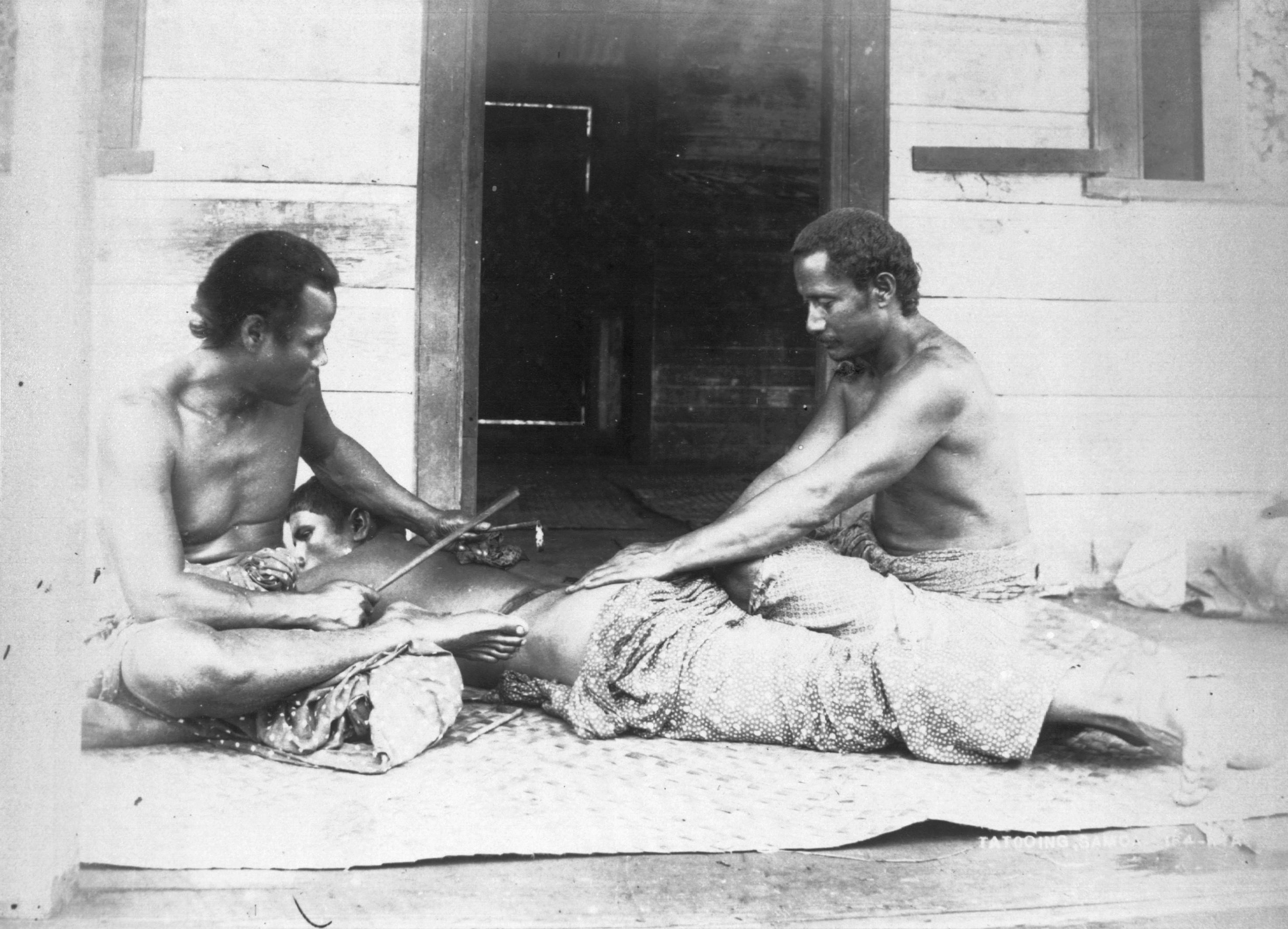
Peʻa, c. 1895 – note instruments in use are broadly similar to those for veiqia

Veiqia also had an impact outside Fiji: according to one Samoan tradition, it was two women from Fiji who travelled to Samoa, beginning the practice of malu. Malu is another female tattooing practice, in which Samoan women are tattooed with geometric designs on the back of their legs from below the knee to the upper thighs. Legend states that the women were the conjoined twins, Taema and Tilafaiga, who were the daughters of Tokilagafanua, the shark-god, and his sister Hinatuafaga, the Moon. In another version recorded in 1969 by G. B.Milner in an article 'Siamese Twins, Birds and the Double Helix' Taema and Tilafaiga travelled to Fiji, where they learnt the art of tattooing from two men, Tufou and Filelei, who told them to "tattoo women, but not men". On the return journey the twins made a mistake and reversed the phrase, leading a tradition of male tattooing in Samoa, known as Peʻa.

== Missionaries, colonisation and decline ==
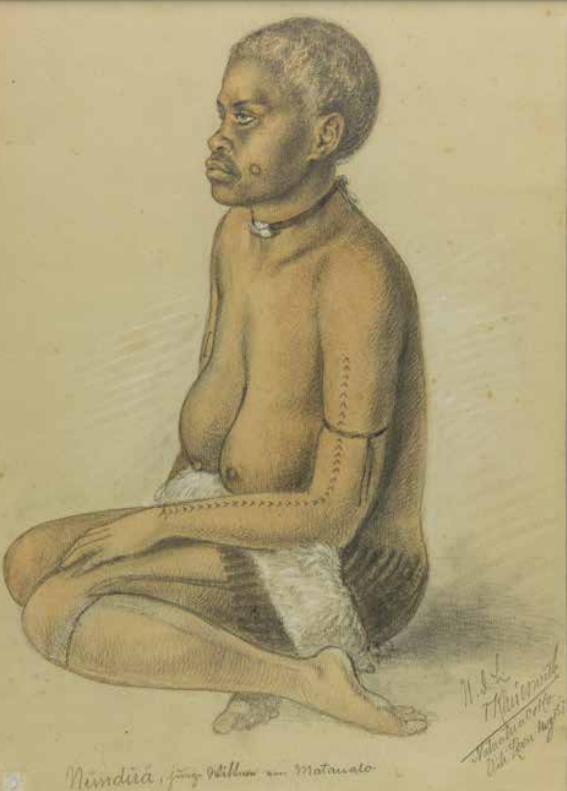
Nundua, a Fijian widow, tattooed with veiqia and qia gusu, drawing by Theodor Kleinschmidt

The first European contact with Fiji was when Abel Tasman visited its islands in 1643. In 1789 William Bligh visited the islands and created several charts of their waters. In the 1820s, according to the explorer Charles Wilkes, European traders had established Levuka as the first European-style town in Fiji, on the island of Ovalau. Christian missionaries like David Cargill also arrived in the 1830s from recently converted regions such as Tonga and Tahiti. Missionary activity and the introduction of Christianity, especially Methodism, impacted traditional Fijian cultural practices. Veiqia was strongly discouraged and those bearing the designs reportedly victimised. Fijian women were also encouraged to adopt Christian dress by missionaries who equated European clothing with western concepts of dignity. As a result, the practice became less common from the 1850s onwards. The Australian newspaper Evening News reported in 1871 that five women were fined ten shillings for "tattooing a woman from the mountains". By 1874, Fiji was part of the British Empire, and to some extent colonial administrators felt that the practice should be tolerated, saying that it was missionaries who often told Fijian women their tattoos were not allowed, not them.

British colonial administrator Adolph Brewster published Hill Tribes of Fiji in 1922, in which he recalled how when he arrived in Rewa and Mbua in 1870, middle-aged and older women were tattooed, but younger women were not. Brewster, writing in The Hill Tribes of Fiji, described the small elliptical mouth tattoos of qia gusu as "rougeish", but he regarded the broader sweeps around the mouth as a "disfigurement". The practice continued in secret in several remote locations until the early twentieth century. One location was Bua Province, where one of the last women to be tattooed was Bu Anaseini Diroko. By 1933, another colonial administrator, Kingsley Roth, wrote in an article 'Some Unrecorded Details on Tatuing in Fiji' that tattooing in Fiji was "a past art", although it went on "surreptitiously" in the provinces of Ra and Mathuata.

== Museum collections ==
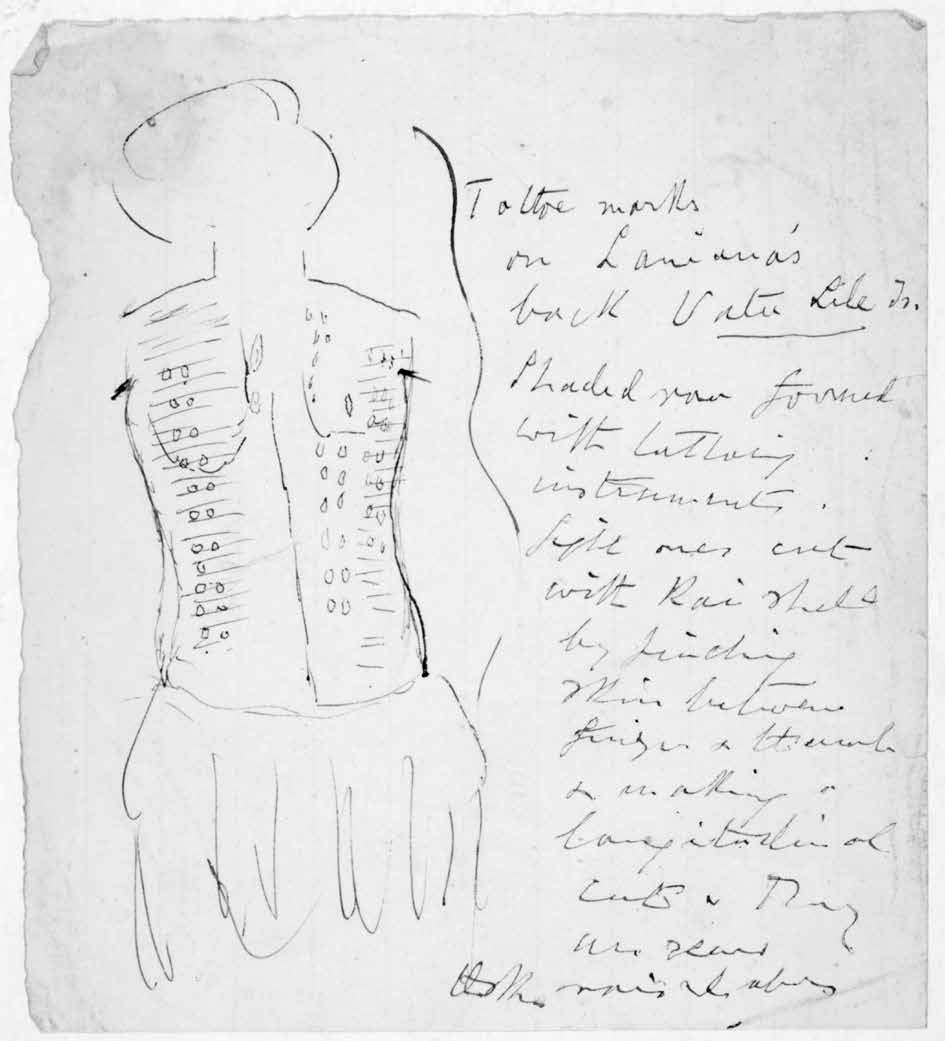
Illustration of and notes on Laniana's back tattoos, von Hügel, 1875–1876

During the nineteenth century, liku and records of veiqia were collected for museums primarily by non-Fijians, curious about but unfamiliar with the practice. As anthropologist Karen Jacobs has observed in her 2021 article 'The Flow of Things', "the tattooed body is hard to collect", so the practice is recorded through illustrations and the objects related to its practice. In the 1870s the largest record of veiqia was made by Anatole von Hügel, who became the first curator of the Museum of Archaeology and Anthropology (MAA) in Cambridge, England. Although Von Hügel made drawings in the field, some Fijian women also drew and recorded veiqia for him. Through comparison of archival drawings and von Hügel's notebooks, objects and drawings have been connected with the names of women whose veiqia were recorded. One woman whose veiqia are recorded, Laniana, also travelled with von Hügel from 1875 to 1876. Women mentioned by von Hügel included Yasenati, who had a turtle motif on her cheek, and Tikini, who had firestick motifs on her arms. Von Hügel was also himself tattooed by some Fijian women, and the tools that were used are in the MAA collection.

In 1981, the director of the Fiji Museum, Fergus Clunie, and his colleague Walesi Ligairi, recorded the veiqia of five eighty-year-old women at Vanua Levu. All the women were tattooed between 1908 and 1911 by dauveiqia Rabali. The women chose to be anonymised once the record of their veiqia was created, to spare their families from perceived embarrassment.

The South Australian Museum has bati (tattooing instruments) in its collection. Other museums that have collected similar material include the Auckland Museum, New Zealand; the Pitt Rivers Museum, UK; and the Peabody Essex Museum, US. The Peabody includes the collection of Benjamin Vanderford, who was captain of a trading vessel, and collected what is likely to be the earliest known liku. The United States Exploring Expedition (1840–1842) (USEE) expanded knowledge of veiqia through collecting liku, and the USEE collection held in the Smithsonian.

== Revival and the Veiqia Project ==
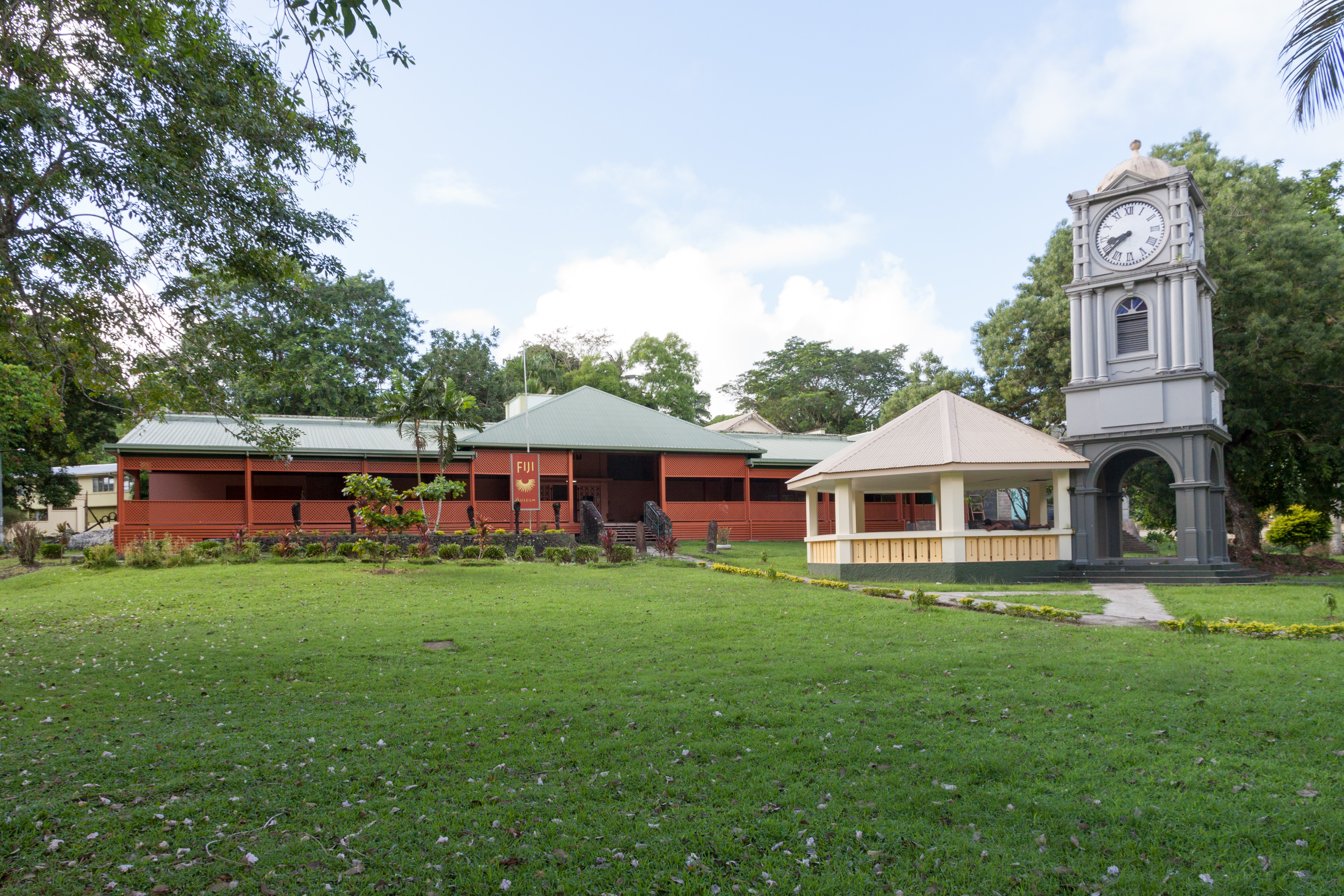
Entrance of the Fiji Museum, where an exhibition about veiqia was held

In 2015, curators Tarisi Vunidilo and Ema Tavola, alongside artists Joana Monolagi, Donita Hulme, Margaret Aull, Luisa Tora, and Dulcie Stewart, initiated a research project to expand knowledge of veiqia and contemporary understanding of the practice. The group drew on its personal significance for them as Fijian women. Stewart is the great-great-granddaughter of Bu Anaseini Diroko, who was one of the last women to be tattooed in the early twentieth century. Working as an artist's collective, under the title the Veiqia Project, the women all have Fijian heritage and live between Fiji, New Zealand and Australia. They travelled to Suva, Fiji, to examine museum collections and speak to community leaders there.

As a result of this research, artworks and interpretation produced by the project were exhibited at the St Paul Street Gallery in Auckland in 2016. In 2017, the collective held an exhibition on veiqia at the Fiji Museum. A further instalment of the collective's work, curated by Luisa Tora, was exhibited in Christchurch in 2021, and was entitled iLakolako ni weniqia: a Veiqia Project Exhibition.

In the early twenty-first century, the work of the Veiqia Project has sparked a revival of interest in the tattooing practice, and younger Fijian women are undergoing veiqia. As of 2022, eight women were known to have full veiqia markings, all of which had been created by the twenty-first century dauveiqia, Julia Mageʼau Gray. After watching a film where Mage'au-Gray tattooed veiqia, Emmaline Pickering-Martin also received veiqia as part of its revival. Ema Tavola also designed a veiqia tattoo for Margaret Aull to mark the death of her grandmother. Both Aull and Pickering-Martin were motivated by a desire to establish a stronger connection to their indigenous Fijian heritage as a primary reason to acquire veiqia.

2025 saw the opening of the exhibition Na Cagi Ni Veisau at the Fiji Museum which celebrated ten years of The Veiqia Project. The show depicts the intertwined cultural histories of veiqia and liku, which a focus on the latter with an aim of revitalise their production. Artists featured in the exhibition include: Ananaia Luvuiwasawasa, Donita Hulme, Dulcie Stewart, Joana Monolagi, Joana Sekinairai Veitala, Amelia Kaukiono, Luisa Tora, Lusie Managreve, Margaret Aull, Mere Rasue, Sikiti Waqabaca and Yasbelle Kerkow. As part of the wider programme daubati Margaret Wall described how urgency was required to ensure continuation of the practice, describing herself as "not the first daubati ... [but] ... the first in a very long time".

== Historiography ==
The history and practice of veiqia was largely recorded by people who were not indigenous to Fiji. The fact that those who are studying veiqia in the twenty-first century rely largely on colonial sources means that, according to Karen Jacobs, often they only describe "a specific regional overview at a specific time". Jacobs describes this in This Is Not a Grass Skirt as a "colonial gaze", which is a lens through which many of the sources need to be critiqued. That bias, coupled with the lack of location-specific data for many museum objects, explains why the current understanding of the practice is incomplete.

One example of a non-Fijian writing about the practice is the British anthropologist Anne Buckland, who published an article in 1888 that discussed the transmission of tattooing from Fiji to Samoa. Another example is the German trader Theodor Kleinschmidt who made many drawings of veiqia, using them as evidence that the patterns created by inland inhabitants of Viti Levu were more elaborate than those of coastal communities. Women he drew included: Ra Enge and her veiqia, qia gusu and other body modifications; Nundua and her veiqia and qia gusu, as well as several others. Kleinschmidt was first a merchant, then a professional museum collector for the Museum Godeffroy, and was active in Fiji from 1871 to 1878. He collected both cultural objects and natural science specimens. Jacobs has also discussed how some women were able to influence collecting, by bartering liku directly with him.
