= Joana Monolagi =

Fijian artist

- Born: Ba, Fiji
- Known for: Masi (Fijian barkcloth) printing, Fijian costumes, meke (dance).
- Movement: Member of the Veiqia Project arts collective
- Awards: Pacific Heritage Award 2015 Arts Pasifika Awards

Joana Monolagi is a Fijian artist and masi maker, whose work is in the collection of Auckland Art Gallery. She was awarded the Pacific Heritage Art Award in 2015 at the Arts Pasifika Awards, recognising her work in supporting art and culture, her role as Fijian coordinator for the Pasifika Festival, and her own unique artistic practice. She is part of The Veiqia Project arts collective.

== Biography ==
Monolagi was born in Ba, Serua Province. She moved to New Zealand in the mid to late 1970s. (Note: The date of her arrival is given as 1975, or 1978.) In 1990 she began to learn how to weave and print masi (barkcloth), teaching herself from memories she had of watching women in Fiji make the cloth when she was younger.

Monolagi says of her upbringing: "It fascinated me to watch and grow up with all these things – weaving, printing, mending and knotting."

In her artistic practice Monolagi combines traditional materials, such as masi and magimagi, alongside modern ones, such as iron-on fabrics. Her works are described as both contemporary art and traditional art – the tension between those definitions is discussed by Kolokesa Uafā Māhina-Tuai with reference to Monolagi's work. Her practice also includes creating Fijian traditional costumes and storytelling. In 2012 her work Pacific Circle was acquired by Auckland Art Gallery. She also contributed a chapter on Fijian wedding traditions to the volume Crafting Aotearoa: A Cultural History of Making in New Zealand and the Wider Moana Oceania, edited by Kolokesa Māhina-Tuai, Karl Chitham and Damian Skinner.

Since 2001 she has been the coordinator of the Fijian Village at the Pasifika Arts Festival in Auckland. This includes planning and managing the exhibitors who showcase the culture of Fiji, from craft and dance to food and drink. Her co-ordination tries to ensure that contemporary Fijian performers are included, to attract younger audiences.

Monolagi has been teaching Fijian arts programmes since 2002, where she started at a school holiday programme teaching masi. In 2020 Monolagi's weekly programme at the local Panmure Community Hall teaching Fijian women arts and crafts went on-line because of Covid-19.

In 2015 she joined a collective of Fijian artists and curators called The Veiqia Project, a collective of Fijian artists and researchers based in Aotearoa New Zealand, Hawai’i and Australia. The collective explores veiqia through workshops and the examination of museum collections. Other members of the collective included: curators Tarisi Vunidilo and Ema Tavola; artists, Dulcie Stewart, Donita Hulme, Margaret Aull, and Luisa Tora. The group's works were exhibited at the St Paul Street Art Gallery in 2016. Initially envisaged as a nine-month long project, the collective continued its investigations, which included travel to Fiji to interview women who remembered the veiqia of their grandmothers, as well as a multimedia exhibition in 2021 entitled iLakolako ni weniqia: a Veiqia Project Exhibition. Veiqia was banned under British colonial rule and the last records of women receiving it date to the 1920s and 1930s. The collective all have been marked with veiqia by artist Julia Mage’au Gray, including Monolagi, who produced work based on her markings for the 2019 exhibition Names Held in Our Mouths at Te Uru Waitākere Contemporary Gallery.

The Veiqia Project including Monolagi opened a multimedia show iLakolako ni weniqia: a Veiqia Project Exhibition at The Physics Room, Christchurch in September 2021.

Joana Monolagi is part of a research project titled The Ulumate Project: Sacredness of Human Hair with Daren Kamali and Ole Maiava. The research investigates the iTaukei / Fijian custom of wig ceremonies in times of mourning. Monolagi recreated a wig from the hair of Kamali, and the three of them presented and talked about their project over 2022.

== Awards ==
In 2015 she was recognised with the Creative NZ Pacific Heritage Art Award.
