= Tarisi Vunidilo =

Fijian archaeologist and curator

- Born: Suva
- Citizenship: Fiji
- Occupations: Archaeologist; curator

Academic background
- Education: University of Auckland
- Theses: The Indigeneity of Archaeological Research in Fiji: Issues and Opportunities (2010); I Yau Vakaviti: Fijian Treasures in International Museums – A Study of Repatriation, Ownership and Cultural Rights (2016)

Tarisi Vunidilo is a Fijian archaeologist and curator who specialises in indigenous museology and heritage management.

== Biography ==
Vunidilo was born in Suva, Fiji. Her parents are from the southern Fijian island of Kadavu. She also studied for a degree in Pacific Geography and Sociology at the University of the South Pacific from 1991 to 1994. In 1993 she spent a year at the University of Hawaii as a Cultural Exchange Student. In 1996 she graduated from the Australian National University with a postgraduate diploma in archaeology. After graduation she worked as Head of Archaeology at the Fiji Museum, excavating multiple sites across the islands, including Cikobia-i-Lau.

After emigrating to New Zealand, she graduated in 2006 with a Postgraduate Diploma in Maori and Pacific Development, then in 2010 graduated with a Masters in Anthropology from the University of Waikato in 2010. Her Masters dissertation addressed: 'The Indigeneity of Archaeological Research in Fiji: Issues and Opportunities'. In 2012 she was Secretary General of the Pacific Islands Museums Association. In 2014 she taught the first Marama Ni Viti course for the Pasifika Education Centre, which covered Fijian women and leadership.

In 2016 she graduated from the Centre of Pacific Island Studies at the University of Auckland with a PhD entitled 'iYau Vakaviti-Fijian Treasures, Cultural Rights and Repatriation of the Cultural Materials from International Museums'. The same year Vunidilo worked with Fijian curator and artist Ema Tavola to co-curate The Veiqia Project - an exhibition and engagement programme inspired by veiqia (Fijian female tattoo). The pair worked with several other artists, including: Dulcie Stewart, Donita Hulme, Joana Monolagi, Margaret Aull, and Luisa Tora.

In 2018 she joined the Department of Anthropology at the University of Hawai‘i at Hilo as assistant professor. In addition to teaching, she is working a project researching Fijian artefacts held at the Bishop Museum. Key to Vunidilo's practise is the encouragement of other indigenous students to study collections from their own cultures and Vunidilo has described how "the face of research is changing. The indigenous voices are now getting stronger and a lot of indigenous people want their voices included in the whole discussion not just to fill in the gaps." She is an expert on Fijian archaeology, pottery and language.

During the COVID-19 pandemic, Vunidilo has created the social media platform Talanoa with Dr T to enable connection between Fiji's primary school children and their heritage.

== Selected publications ==
- Vunidilo, Tarisi, Betty Loto, and Kali Vunidilo. "Cultural Treasures: a youth empowerment programme to build relationships between Pasifika students, their families, and academic staff." (2018).
- 'Pacific Museums & Climate Change' in Climate Change and Museum Futures (2014).
- Feasibility Study Report on World Heritage Sites and Museums - Pacific Islands Museums Association for UNESCO (2012).
- Clark, Geoffrey Richard, Atholl Anderson, and Tarisi Vunidilo, eds. The Archaeology of Lapita Dispersal in Oceania: Papers from the Fourth Lapita Conference, June 2000, Canberra, Australia. Vol. 17. Pandanus Books, 2001.
- Frédérique Valentin, C. S., Le Goff, I., Vunidilo, T. S., Sepeti Matararaba, A. O., Bole, J., Baret, D., & Naucabalavu, J. (2001). Burial practices at the end of the prehistoric period in Cikobia-i-ra (Macuata, Fiji). In The Archaeology of Lapita Dispersal in Oceania: Papers from the Fourth Lapita Conference, June 2000, Canberra, Australia (Vol. 17, p. 211). Pandanus Books.
- Sand, C., Valentin, F., Bole, J., Ouetcho, A., Baret, D., Sorovi-Vunidilo, T., & Matararaba, S. (2007). Report and preliminary analysis of the first archaeological survey of Naqelelevu Atoll, Northeast Fiji. The Journal of the Polynesian Society, 116(4), 407–432.
- Sand, Christophe, Frederique Valentin, and Tarisi Sorovi-Vunidilo. "[CERAMICS AND OBSIDIAN IN ISLAND SOUTHEAST ASIA AND OCEANIA] At the border of Polynesia: archaeological research in the East Fijian islands of Cikobia and Naqelelevu." Bulletin of the Indo-Pacific Prehistory Association 20 (2000): 107–116.
