= Memorial to the forced labourers deported to Wolfhagen between 1939 and 1945 =

Memorial in Wolfhagen, Germany

- Gedenkstätte für die zwischen 1939 und 1945 ins Wolfhager Land verschleppten Zwangsarbeiter
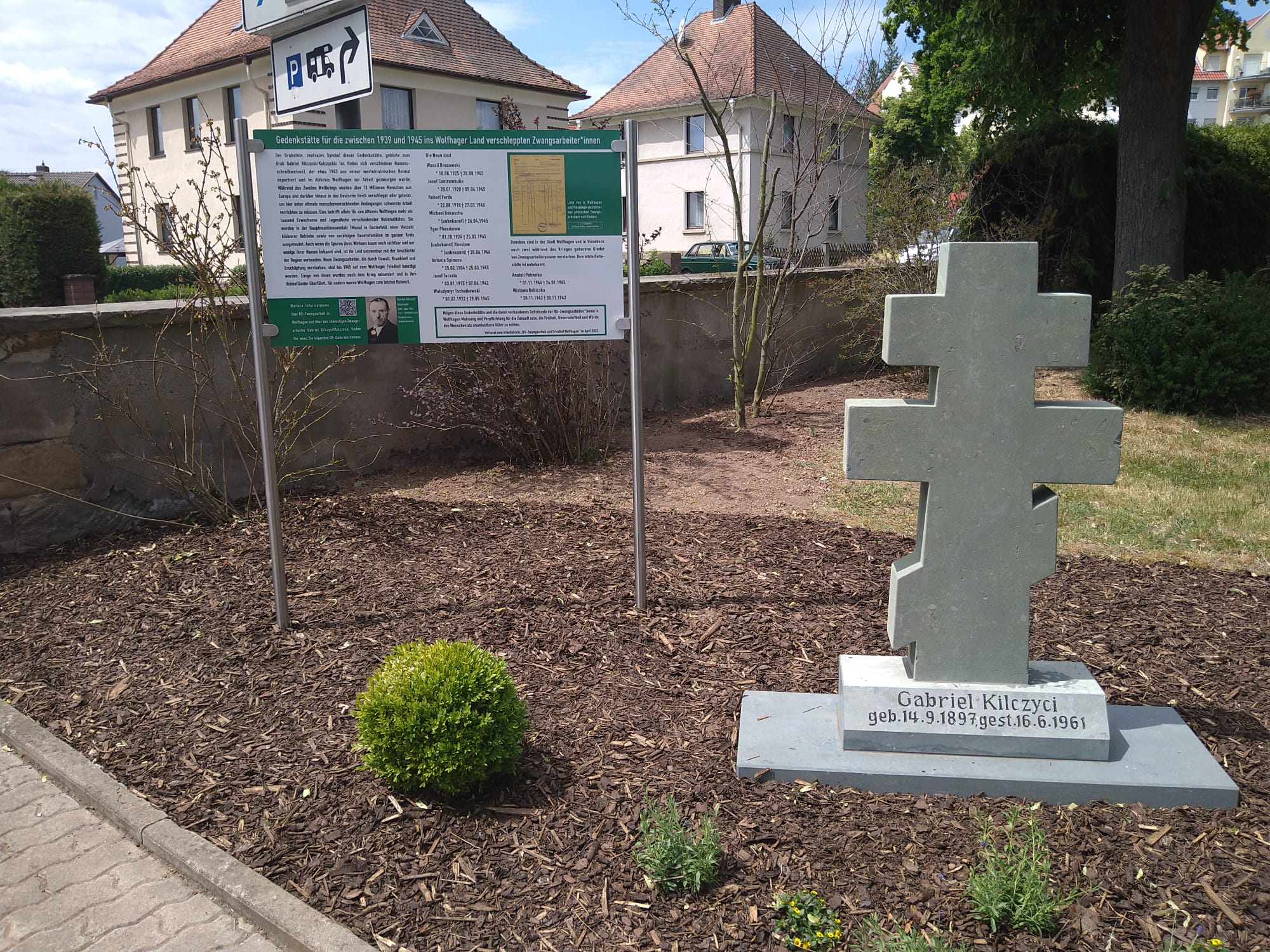
- General view of the Memorial
- Interactive map of Memorial to the forced labourers deported to Wolfhagen between 1939 and 1945
- Location: Wolfhagen, Germany
- Coordinates: 51°19′29.83″N 9°10′29.53″E
- Dedicated date: 16 June 2023
- Dedicated to: forced labourers
- Website: The story of a gravestone

The memorial at the Wolfhagen cemetery is dedicated to the forced labourers deported to the old district of Wolfhagen between 1939 and 1945.

== Description ==
The memorial commemorates nine forced labourers who were deported to Germany between 1939 and 1945 and died in Wolfhagen until 1945. They came from France, Italy, Poland and the Soviet Union. Most of the nine forced labourers died immediately before or after the liberation by the Americans on 31 March 1945, which is a clear sign of the undersupply and malnutrition at the time. In addition, one forced labourer was shot dead in Wolfhagen's forest a good two months after the liberation. The memorial plaque also lists the names of two children of Polish forced labourer couples who died in Wolfhagen and Wolfhagen-Viesebeck. Their final resting place is unknown.

Next to the memorial plaque is the gravestone of Gabriel Kulczycki, who was deported from his homeland in western Ukraine to the old district of Wolfhagen in 1943 at the latest and had to perform forced labour on various farms, such as the Rittergut Wettesingen, as well as in a munitions factory in what is now Wolfhagen-Gasterfeld. For unknown reasons, Gabriel Kulczycki decided to stay in Wolfhagen after the war and lived there until he was transferred to the psychiatric hospital in Haina due to dementia and died there in 1961. During his time in Wolfhagen, Gabriel Kulczycki lived as an isolated outsider who was mocked and ridiculed. His fate is that of one of the so-called "heimatlose Ausländer" (rootless foreigners) by the German authorities, who lived among the population of post-war Germany but were never considered part of German society. Gabriel Kulczycki's fate thus shows how disdainfully former forced labourers were treated in post-war Germany and that forced labour had lifelong physical and psychological effects on those affected.

Finally, the gravestone in the form of an Orthodox cross also has a chequered history: After Gabriel Kulczycki's grave was levelled, it was kept because of its unusual shape, but placed at the edge of the cemetery so that it was slowly overgrown by the cemetery hedge. Although they did not know the story of Gabriel Kulczycki, Ukrainians who moved to Wolfhagen in the 1990s recognised the shape of the gravestone and placed candles there on All Saints' Day. They helped to ensure that the gravestone was not forgotten.

== Origins and Public Reception of the Memorial ==
Plans for a possible memorial at the Wolfhagen cemetery began in 2021, after the topic gained renewed relevance due to new research findings on Nazi forced labor in Wolfhagen. The initial process progressed slowly. On 16 June 2023, the anniversary of Gabriel Kulczycki's death, the memorial was finally presented to the public by the working group "NS-Zwangsarbeit und Friedhof Wolfhagen" (Nazi Forced Labor and the Wolfhagen Cemetery). This was preceded by two donation appeals in local media. Both regional and national guests were invited to the inauguration ceremony. Among those present were members of the German-French Forum Kassel, the ASG Italia 1972 association, as well as Jan Krzymowski from the Consulate General of the Republic of Poland in Cologne.

The working group "NS-Zwangsarbeit und Friedhof Wolfhagen" was awarded the 2023 Honorary Award of the City of Wolfhagen "for its voluntary commitment to addressing the history of forced labor during World War II and preserving historical heritage."

== Bibliography ==
- Erich Abel, Gretel Riedemann (2017): Ein Knecht namens Mussolini!, in: Dirk Lindemann (ed.): Wolfhager Geschichten, Teil 3: Nachkriegszeiten und Kleinstadt-Flausen, S. 228–230. ISBN 978-3-946128-23-6.
- Bernd Klinkhardt, Wilhelm G. Winter (1994): Wolfhagen im Zeitgeschehen von 1945. Schriften des Vereins Regionalmuseum Wolfhagen. ISBN 3-924219-13-3.
- Bernd Klinkhardt (2004): Lufthauptmunitionsanstalt Wolfhagen LHMa 1/XII Wn: Geschichte und Gegenwart einer ehemaligen Munitionsfabrik. ISBN 3-924219-18-4
- Phillip Landgrebe (28 January 2021): The Story of a Gravestone, in: EUSTORY History Campus of the Körber Foundation.
- Phillip Landgrebe (25 February 2021): Der Grabstein in der Hecke in: Jungle World 08/2021.
- Phillip Landgrebe (22 March 2021): Die Geschichte eines Grabsteins in: Archive in Nordhessen. Gemeinschaftsblog der nordhessischen Archive.
- Phillip Landgrebe (30 April 2021): Zwangsarbeiter*innen als Teil unserer Migrationsgeschichte: Warum steht Gabriels Grabstein in der Hecke? in: MIGRATIONSGESCHICHTEN. Ein Blog von Gegen Vergessen e. V.
- Phillip Landgrebe (2022): Zwangsarbeit in den Dörfern des Landkreises. Von der Forschung missachtet: NS-Zwangsarbeit in der Landwirtschaft in: Jahrbuch Landkreis Kassel, S. 68–71.
- Evelyn Hojn (2024): Erinnerung an NS-Zwangsarbeiter. Gedenkstätte für die zwischen 1939-1945 ins Wolfhager Land verschleppten "Ostarbeiter" in: Jahrbuch Landkreis Kassel, S. 60.
