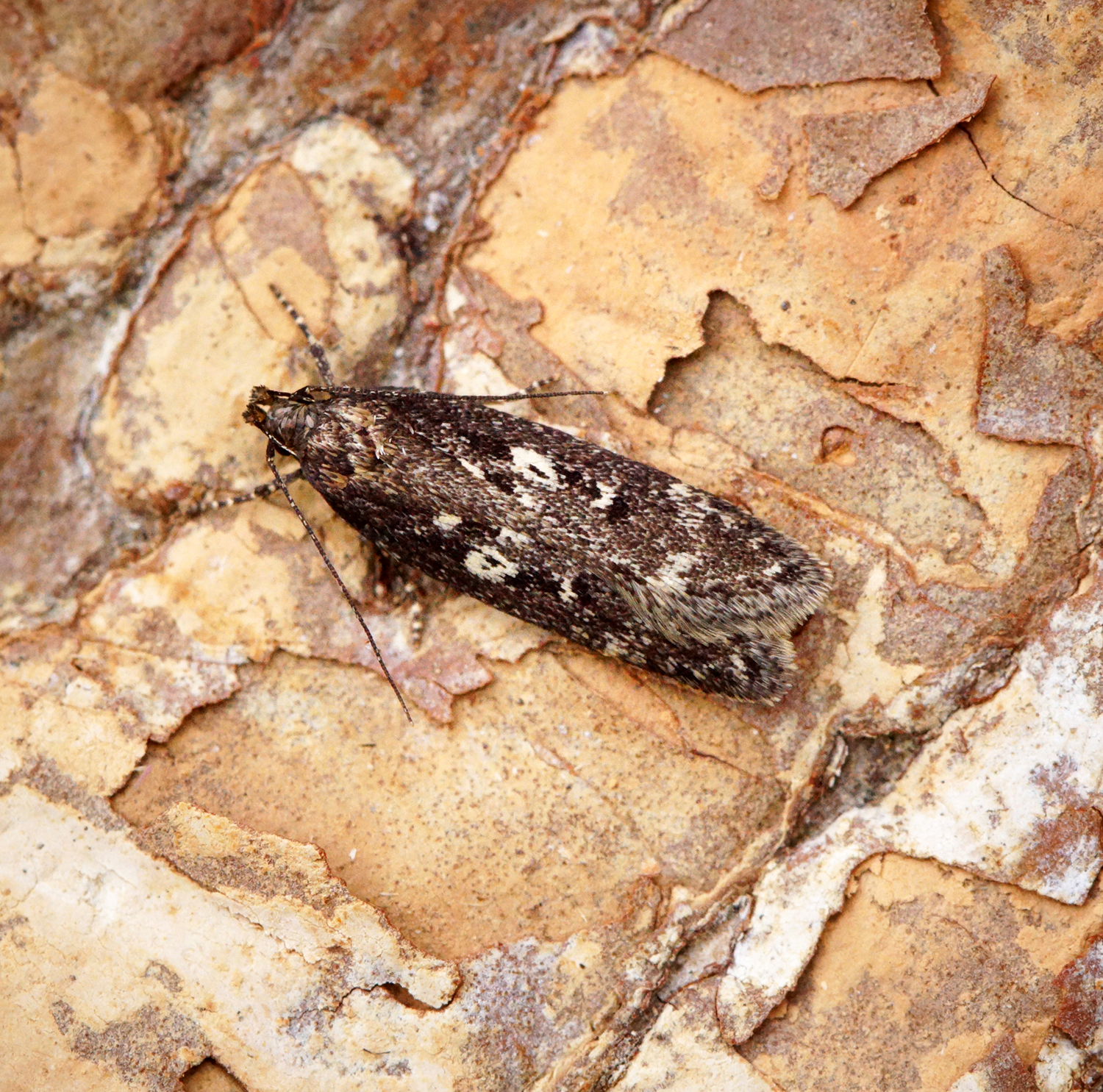

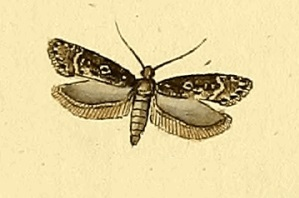

Scientific classification
- Kingdom: Animalia
- Phylum: Arthropoda
- Clade: Pancrustacea
- Class: Insecta
- Order: Lepidoptera
- Family: Gelechiidae
- Genus: Gelechia
- Species: G. sororculella

Binomial name
- Gelechia sororculella (Hübner, 1817)

Synonyms
- Tinea sororculella Hübner, 1817; Tines sororculella

= Gelechia sororculella =

Dark-striped groundling

Species of moth

Gelechia sororculella, the dark-striped groundling, is a moth of the family Gelechiidae. It is widely distributed from Europe, throughout Siberia to the Russian Far East.

== Life cycle and description ==
The wingspan is 15–17 mm. The terminal joint of palpi is almost as long as second. Forewings rather dark fuscous, more or less whitish-sprinkled, paler dorsally, between veins blackish mixed; a white dot in disc at 1/4; stigmata black, first discal conspicuously white-ringed, other two partly white-edged, first and second discal connected by a blackish streak; a blackish interrupted streak along fold; a fine whitish angulated fascia at 3/4; terminal blackish dots, partly whitish-edged. Hind wings are over 1, grey.The larva is whitish green; dorsal and lateral lines broad, brown; head brown.

Adults are on wing from July to August in one generation per year.

=== Ova ===
Eggs are laid on willows (Salix species), usually goat willow (S. caprea) but also eared willow (S. aurita), grey willow (S. cinerea), purple willow (S. purpurea), creeping willow (S.repens) and osier (S. viminalis).

=== Larva ===
Larvae can be found in May.

=== Pupa ===
The pale brown pupa can be found in May and June in a spinning among leaves.
