= Pacific Islands Museums Association =

The Pacific Islands Museums Association (PIMA) is, as its name suggests, an association of museums located in the region of the Pacific islands. Its stated aims include facilitating the "safeguarding and preservation of Oceania’s heritage and heritage places"; "disseminat[ing] cultural heritage information" among Pacific Islanders; and advising governments on policies to manage cultural heritage.

Founded in 1994, the association was initially based in Noumea, hosted and supported by the Secretariat of the Pacific Community. Incorporated as a non-profit organisation in May 1999, PIMA established itself on the site of the Fiji Museum in Suva. In 2006, PIMA relocated to the site of the Vanuatu Cultural Centre in Port Vila. It is now expected to rotate between museums in the region "every few years".

Its members comprise forty-five museums and cultural centres in the Pacific, as well as a number of "national trusts, cultural departments and ministries, national parks, historic preservation offices, interpretative centres, cultural associations and arts councils". Among its members is the New Zealand Pacific Museums Network, which includes the Te Papa Tongarewa Museum. PIMA is, itself, a member of the International Council of Museums.

As of 2006, the Chairperson of PIMA's Executive Board was Faustina Rehuher, Director of the Belau National Museum. Simon Poraituk, Acting Director of the Papua New Guinea National Museum and Art Gallery, served as her deputy. In 2012 Tarisi Vunidilo was Secretary General of the association.

PIMA has received funding from, among others, AusAID, NZAID, various departments of the Australian government, France's embassy to Suva, the International Centre for the Study of Conservation and the Restoration of Cultural Property, the International Council of Museums, the Secretariat of the Pacific Community's Cultural Affairs Programme, UNESCO's Pacific Regional Office, and the World Heritage Centre.

AYAD describes it as "the first regional, multilingual, multicultural and non-profit collective of heritage institutions" in the Pacific, and "an established leader in cultural heritage education, training and capacity building".
