= Theodor Kleinschmidt =

German trader, explorer and naturalist

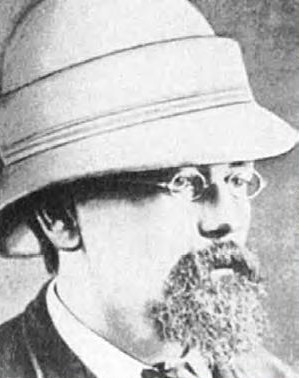
Theodor Kleinschmidt

Johann Theodor Kleinschmidt (6 March 1834 in Wolfhagen – 10 April 1881 in Utuan, Duke of York Islands, Bismarck Archipelago) was a German trader, explorer and naturalist. He sometimes anglicised his name as John Theodore Klinesmith. He worked for the J. C. Godeffroy and Sohn and collected natural history specimens for Museum Godeffroy as well as some European collectors. He was murdered on the island of Utuan in New Britain.

== Biography ==
Map of the research stays of Theodor Kleinschmidt in Oceania, 1873-1881.

Kleinschmidt was the son of Georg (1806–61) and Amalie van Heyken (born 1810). He trained as a mechanic at Kassel and worked for the Main Weser Railways at the age of 18. He also trained as an artist and then as a sailor and moved to the United States of America in 1843 but had to give up due to short-sight. He launched out in business in Saint Louis (Missouri) while also showing skills as an artist. He suffered losses during the Civil War when he served as a major between 1861 and 1865 and went bankrupt. He then left for Australia then on to Fiji to flee his creditors. His trade with the natives was not brilliant, in particular because of the economic crisis of 1874. The Museum Godeffroy of Hamburg then offered a new opportunity to him. The institution charged him with collecting natural history specimens, fauna and flora, in the Solomon Islands and New Hebrides, territories largely unexplored hitherto. In 1873 he supplied bird specimens to Otto Finsch who worked at the Museum Godeffroy. In 1879 he moved to take the position of Franz Hübner. He was assassinated along with two of his assistant by natives in 1881 on the island of Utuan in the Duke of York Island group. The locals possibly confused him with the much-hated Englishman Lyttelton Webber who was also murdered by the locals. He was the uncle of the priest and ornithologist Otto Kleinschmidt (1870–1954).

=== Eponymous taxa ===
The pink-billed parrotfinch (Erythrura kleinschmidti) was named in his honour by Otto Finsch.

== Literature ==
- Walther Killy (Hersg.): Enzyklopädie der Biographien. Saur Verlag, München, 2000
