= Julia Mageʼau Gray =

Dancer, choreographer and tattoo artist from Papua New Guinea

Julia Mageʼau Gray (born 1973) is a dancer, choreographer and tattoo artist from Papua New Guinea, who is credited with revitalising women's tattoo traditions in communities from Papua New Guinea and Fiji.

== Biography ==
=== Early life ===
Mageʼau Gray was born in 1973 in the Mekeo-speaking area of Central Province, Papua New Guinea. Her mother was Papuan and her father Australian.

=== Career ===
In 1997 in Adelaide she co-founded Sunameke, an arts performance company with Yolanda Gray, Katrina Sonter and Samantha Sonter. Her work as a dancer and choreographer is inspired by her Papua New Guinean heritage. She is known for her criticism of "Western" attempts to use one word for all the cultures of the southern Pacific Ocean, citing the wide variety of languages spoken and diversity of lived experiences.

In 2014, she retrained as a tattoo artist, building on the interest she had acquired in Melanesian tattooing in her work as a choreographer and film-maker. She was encouraged to learn the art after a trip to Samoa in 2012, where she met the Samoan artist Suluʻape Saʻa Alaivaʻa Petelo. She apprenticed for six months in New Zealand, where she learnt both hand-poke and hand-tap tattooing. Often working with hand-poke techniques, she has described the process as "surprisingly gentle". In 2017 she tattooed art dealer Lana Lopesi live, as a performance which was part of the exhibition Lain Blo Yu Mi – Our People Our Lines held at Vunilagi Vou gallery. The exhibition was curated by Ema Tavola, and was staged as a tribute to the central role that Mageʼau Gray has played in the revitalisation of Melanesian women's tattoos. In the same year Mageʼau Gray travelled to Spain, where her work was exhibited as part of the Traditional Tattoo and World Culture Festival.

Mageʼau Gray is known for her work tattooing Fijian veiqia designs, for example on artists Dulcie Stewart and Luisa Tora, as well as other members of The Veiqia Project. She also the first person in eighty years to tattoo traditional designs in the Mekeo area, that had been discouraged by the colonising activity of missionaries.

In 2021, as a result of her work on reviving female tattooing in Melanesia, she was profiled in Crafting Aotearoa as an artist bringing traditional artistic practices to contemporary audiences. The same year, her 2011 audio-visual work Best Foot Forward was acquired by the Queensland Gallery of Modern Art.

== Filmography ==
- Best Foot Forward (2011)
- Tep Tok: Reading Between Our Lines (2013–15)

== Exhibition and performance ==
- Lain Blo Yu Mi – Our People Our Lines (2017)
- Wahine Toa (2017)
- Melanesian Marks: IG (2019)

== Personal life ==
As of 2015, she lived in Australia with her Māori husband.
