= Acacia richii =

Conservation status
- Least Concern (IUCN 3.1)

Scientific classification
- Kingdom: Plantae
- Clade: Tracheophytes
- Clade: Angiosperms
- Clade: Eudicots
- Clade: Rosids
- Order: Fabales
- Family: Fabaceae
- Subfamily: Caesalpinioideae
- Clade: Mimosoid clade
- Genus: Acacia
- Species: A. richii

Binomial name
- Acacia richii A.Gray

Synonyms
- Racosperma richii (A.Gray) Pedley

Species of flowering plant

Acacia richii (Qumu in Fijian) is a species of flowering plant in the pea family (Fabaceae). It is a tree endemic to Fiji. It grows up to 25 meters tall. It is native to moist lowland and lower montane forests from 100 to 900 metres elevation on the islands of Viti Levu and Vanua Levu. It grows in dense forest and forest patches at lower elevations, and on forested crests, ridges, and hillsides at higher elevations.
