= Fiji Museum =

Museum in Suva, Fiji

Coordinates: 18.1495°S 178.4258°E

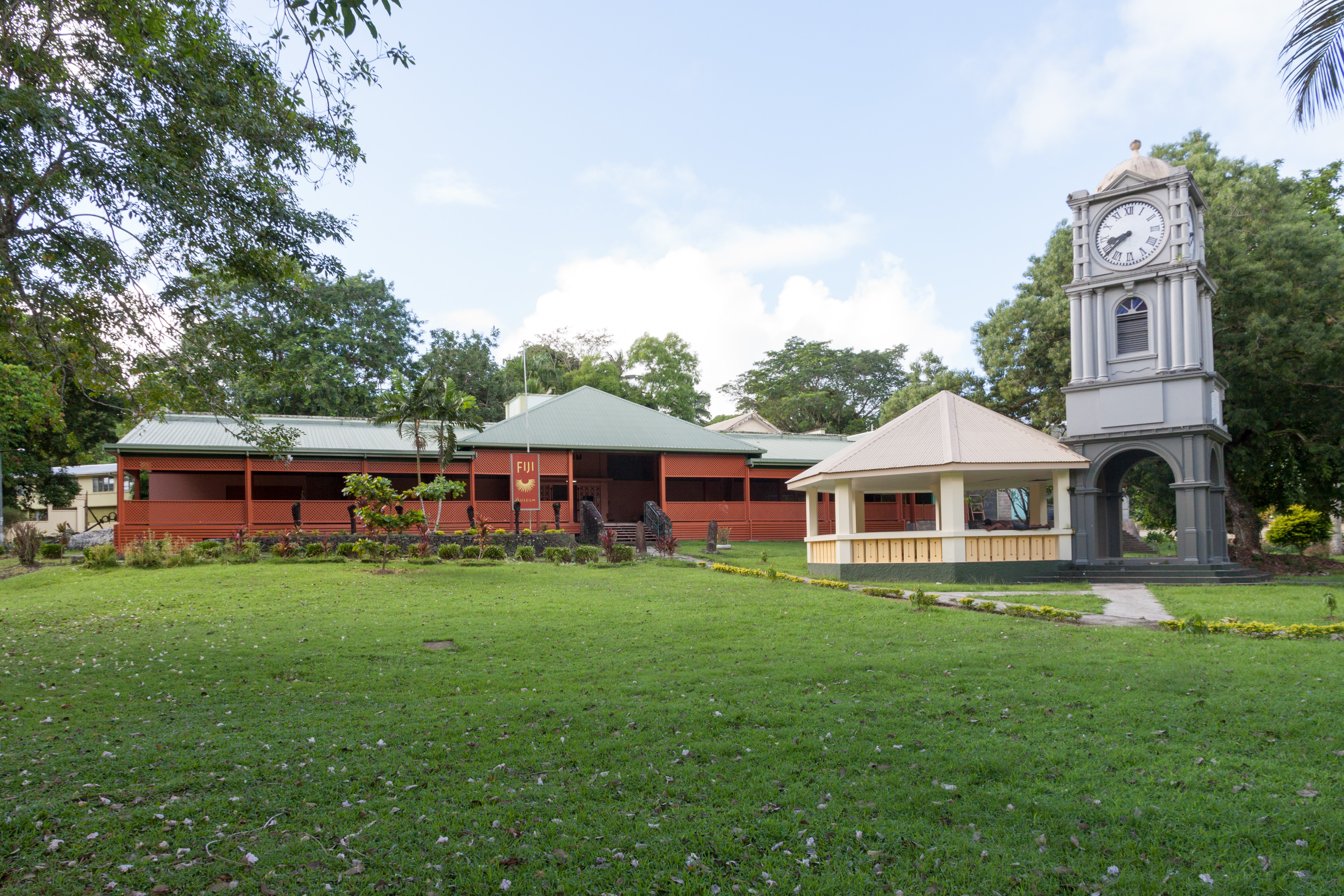
- Museum complex
- Location: Suva, Fiji
- Type: National museum
- Website: fijimuseum.org.fj

The Fiji Museum is a museum in Suva, Fiji, located in the capital city's botanical gardens, Thurston Gardens.

== Background ==
The museum is a statutory body and is under the administration of the Fiji Museum Act and the Preservation of Objects of Archaeological & Palaeontological Interest Act.

== History ==
The museum was founded in 1904 by a voluntary association - the Friends of Fiji Museum. During the twentieth century its location moved several times before its current location in Thurston Gardens. Its original location was in the old Town Hall. The museum was opened in 1955 by the Governor of Fiji, Sir Ronald Garvey. In 2019 a proposal was put forward that part of the site of Thurston Gardens could be developed by the Indian High Commission; this proposal was opposed by the Director of the Fiji Museum, Sipiriano Nemani. In 2021, former director of the museum, Timaima Sagale Buadromo, had an acquittal for corruption charges and abuse of office reversed, in order to await a new trial.

The museum is part of the Museums & Climate Change Network. The Fiji Museum was the host institution for the Pacific Islands Museums Association (PIMA) secretariat until 2006, when the secretariat transferred its base of operations to Port Vila, Vanuatu.

== Collections ==
The Fiji Museum holds the most important collection of Fijian artifacts in the world. The centrepiece of the museum's collection is the 13 metre-long double-hulled canoe, Ratu Finau. Other important objects include the rudder from HMS Bounty, objects relating to cannibalism, as well as objects that record the impact of colonial impact on the islands. This includes a display about Indo-Fijian communities. The museum collects oral histories and undertakes archaeological excavations. The museum has a collection of contemporary art. It also has a manuscript collection.

== Research ==
=== Archaeology and excavation ===
The museum's archaeological collections date back 3700 years. Osteological material from the archaeological collection was used for stable isotopic (δ13C, δ15N) analysis of bone collagen in order to identify the "percent contribution of human flesh" to prehistoric diets. The study's results showed that this was "low for all individual Lauans".

The museum organised and partnered on archaeological excavations across the islands, including:

- Sigatoka Research Project (1967), which included sites at Natunuku, Sigatoka and others to investigate Polynesian prehistory.
- Rove Beach, Viti Levu Island (2003) to investigate Lapita settlement.
- Mamanuca and Malolo Islands (2006)
- Cikobia-i-Ra - to investigate burial practices.
- Navatanitawake Ceremonial Mound on the island of Bau (1970).
- Moturiki (2000s) in collaboration with the UPS.

=== Collaborative partnerships ===
In 2021 the museum signed a memorandum of understanding with four British museums to mark Fiji's 50th anniversary with a knowledge exchange programme. Under the proposal staff from the Fiji Museum would provide cultural information about iTaukei artifacts held in British collections.

== Notable people ==
- Sagale Buadromo, former Director and Registrar.
- Sipiriano Nemani, Director.
- Tarisi Vunidilo, former Curator of Archaeology.

== Gallery ==
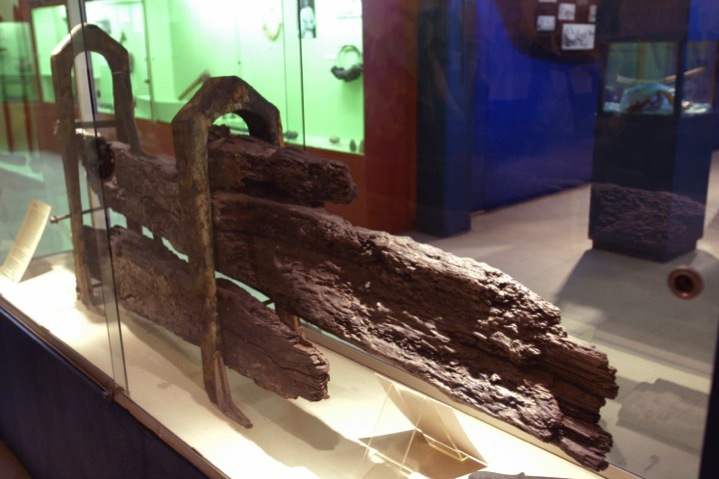
Rudder from HMS Bounty

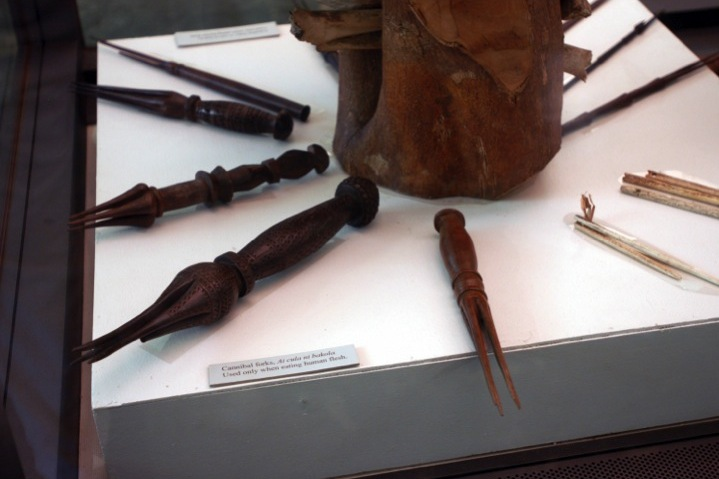
Forks used in cannibalistic practices

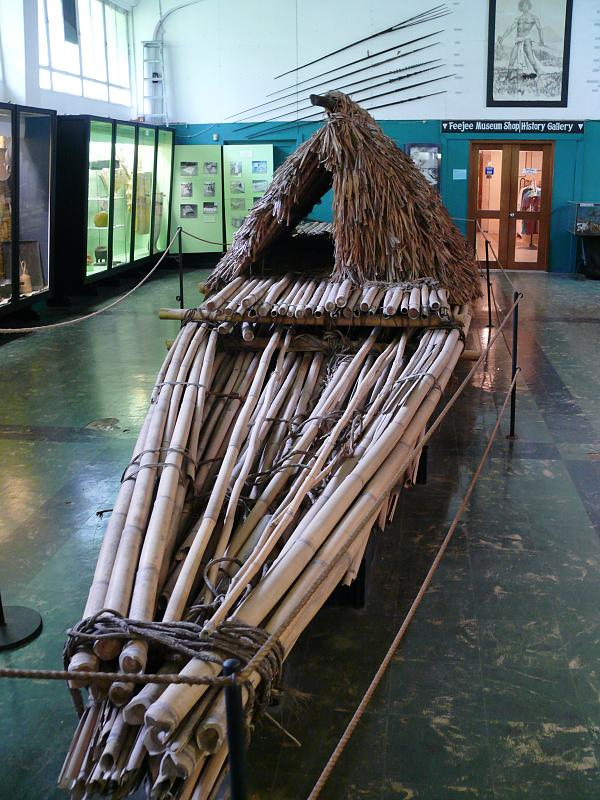
Fijian raft

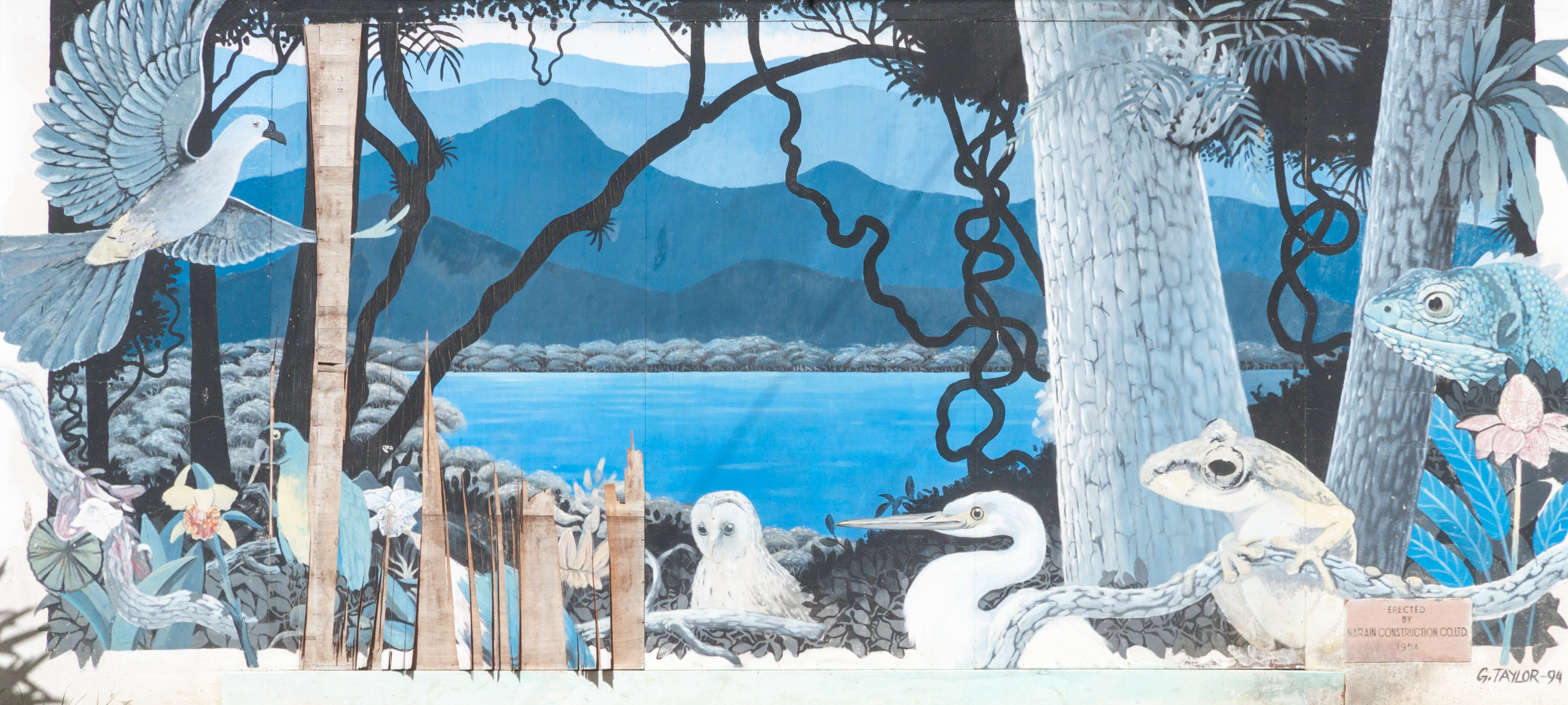
Mural at Fiji Museum

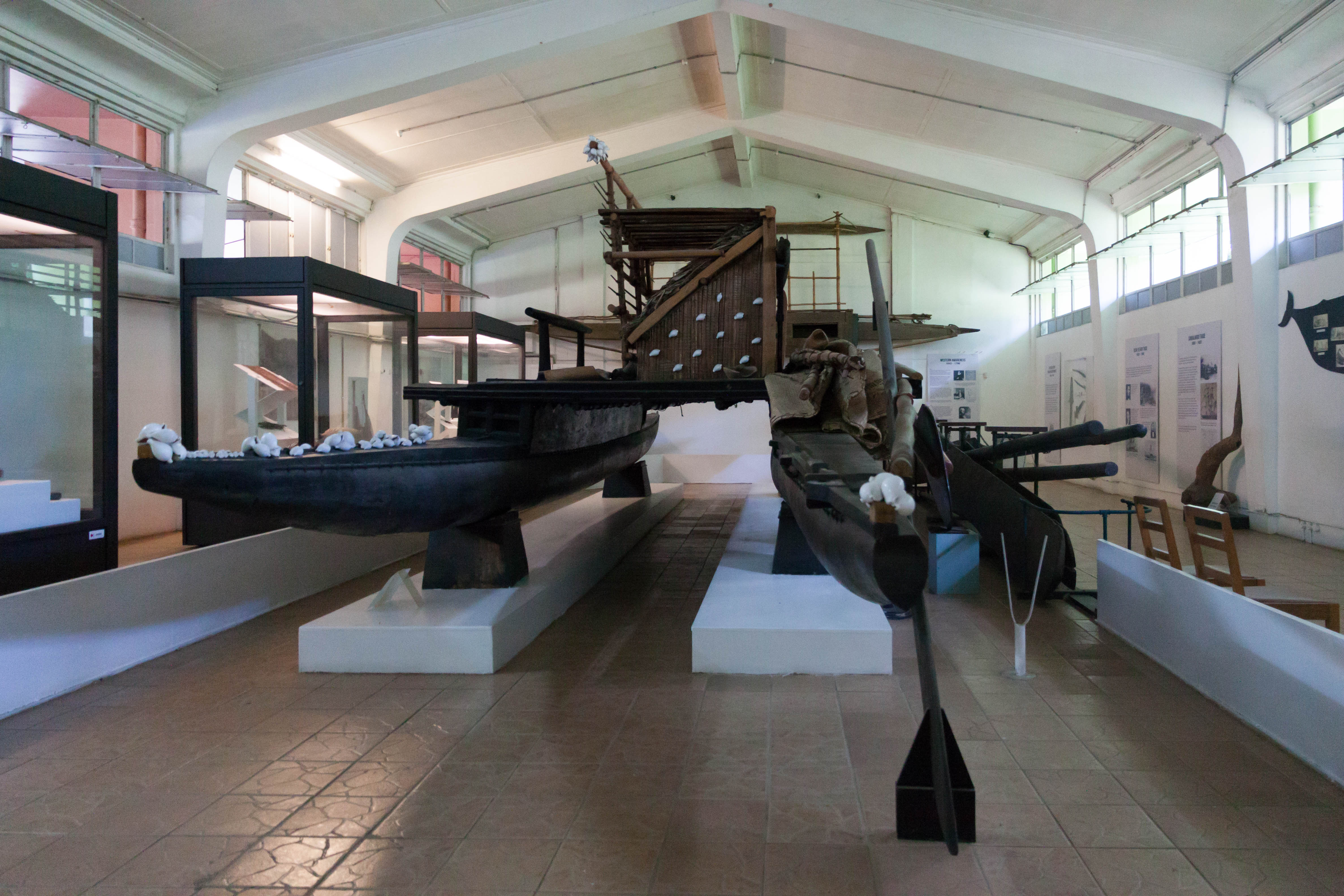
Ratu Finau (1913) - Fiji's last waqa tabus (double-hulled canoe)
