= Wolfhagen =

Place in Hesse, Germany

- Town
- Coat of arms

- Location of Wolfhagen within Kassel district
- Interactive map of Wolfhagen
- Location within Germany Location within Hesse
- Coordinates: 51°19′N 09°10′E
- Country: Germany
- State: Hesse
- Admin. region: Kassel
- District: Kassel

Government
  - Mayor (2023–29): Dirk Scharrer (Ind.)

Area
  - Total: 112.29 km^{2} (43.36 sq mi)
- Elevation: 242–385 m (794–1,263 ft)

Population (2025-12-31)
  - Total: 12,576
  - Density: 112.00/km^{2} (290.07/sq mi)
- Time zone: UTC+01:00 (CET)
  - Summer (DST): UTC+02:00 (CEST)
- Postal codes: 34466
- Dialling codes: 05692
- Vehicle registration: KS, HOG, WOH
- Website: www.wolfhagen.de

Wolfhagen (German pronunciation: [vɔlfˈhaːɡn̩]) is a town in the district of Kassel, in Hesse, Germany. It is located 12 km southeast of Bad Arolsen, and 23 km west of Kassel on the German Timber-Frame Road. In 1992, the town hosted the 32nd Hessentag state festival.

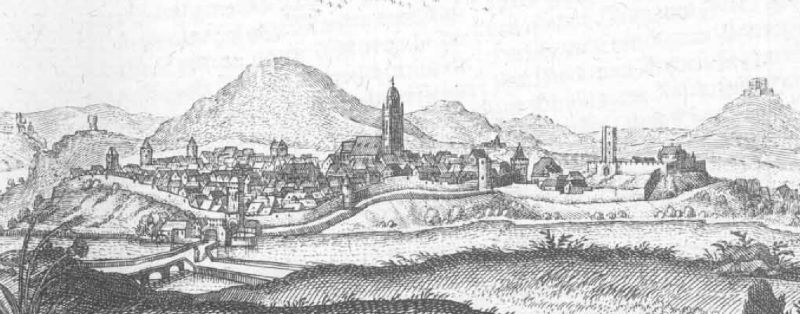
A Topographia Hassiae of Wolfhagen in 1655

== Mayor ==
The mayor Reinhard Schaake (independent) was elected in 1999. Schaake was reelected in 2005 and 2011.

== From private to public electrical grid ==
The town did not renew its contract with the large electricity provider, E.ON. The town took back control of its electrical power grid and was successful in paying back the loans for the start-up costs.

== Sons and daughters of the city ==
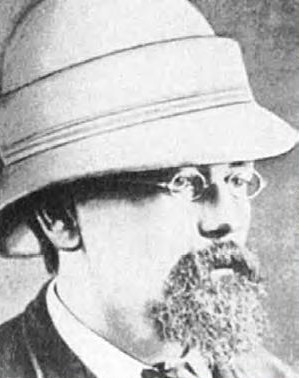
Theodor Kleinschmidt

- Conrad Abée (1806–1873), politician, from 1860 Hessian Minister of Justice
- Theodor Kleinschmidt (1834–1881), traveler, merchant and naturalist
- Holger Trimhold (born 1953), footballer and coach
- Erhard Hofeditz (born 1953), football player
