= Franz Hübner =

German entomologist

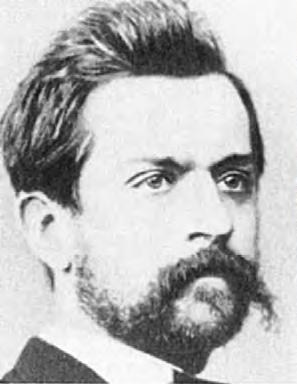
Franz Hübner

Franz Hübner(18 November 1846 Drossen, near Frankfurt an der Oder – 31 December 1877) was a German entomologist

Between 1875 and 1877 he collected insects for the Museum Godeffroy in Samoa, Tonga and New Britain.
