= Ema Tavola =

Fijian-born New Zealand curator and artist (born 1982)

- Born: 1982 (age 43–44)
- Education: Manukau School of Visual Arts
- Occupations: Artist & curator
- Organization(s): Founder of Fresh Gallery and Vunilagi Vou galleries in Auckland
- Known for: Advocacy of Pacific art and artists

Ema Tavola (born 1982) is a Fijian-born New Zealand artist, curator, arts manager and advocate using art to centralise 'Pacific ways of seeing'.

== Early life and family ==
Tavola was born in Fiji. Her father is from Dravuni in the Kadavu province of Fiji. Her mother is a third generation Pākehā from Palmerston North in New Zealand. While she was growing up she also lived with her family in London and Belgium. As a teenager they moved to Wellington, New Zealand and she attended Wellington High School. After high school Tavola was having a gap year in Fiji and experienced the 2000 Fiji civilian coup.

== Education and career ==
Returning to New Zealand, Tavola went on to study a Bachelor of Visual Arts from Manukau School of Visual Arts at Manukau Institute of Technology, and got a job with Manukau City Council after graduating.

In 2006 she founded the Fresh Gallery in Ōtara, Auckland as a partnership with Manukau City Council and the local community. In 2013 it re-opened after expansion.

== Artistic career ==
Tavola has speaking engagements at conferences and other places. In 2019 she was a guest speaker at Para Site International Conference, Hong Kong, the Singapore Art Book Fair for NTU Centre for Contemporary Art (Singapore) and Spinning Triangles: Ignition of a School of Design for SAVVY Contemporary (Berlin, Germany / Kinshasa, Democratic Republic of Congo).

In 2019 Tavola opened an independent art gallery called Vunilagi Vou, the gallery closed in 2023.

Tavola's artworks are held in Auckland Art Gallery.

== Curatorial work ==
- 2016 – Dravuni: Sivia yani na Vunilagi – Beyond the Horizon - New Zealand Maritime Museum
- 2017 – Kaitani – The Physics Room (New Zealand)
- 2018 – A Maternal Lens – 4th International Biennial of Casablanca (Morocco)
- 2018 – Dravuni: Sivia yani na Vunilagi – Beyond the Horizon - Oceania Centre for Arts, Culture and Pacific Studies, University of the South Pacific (Fiji)

== Awards and residencies ==
2017 – Pacific Studies Artist in Residence – University of Canterbury Macmillan Brown Centre
