= Cook Islands art =

Wood carving is a common art form in the Cook Islands. Sculpture in stone is much rarer although there are some excellent carvings in basalt by Mike Tavioni. The proximity of islands in the southern group helped produce a homogeneous style of carving but which had special developments in each island. Rarotonga is known for its fisherman's gods and staff-gods, Atiu for its wooden seats, Mitiaro, Mauke and Atiu for mace and slab gods and Mangaia for its ceremonial adzes. Most of the original wood carvings were either spirited away by early European collectors or were burned in large numbers by missionary zealots.

Today, carving is no longer the major art form with the same spiritual and cultural emphasis given to it by the Maori in New Zealand. However, there are continual efforts to interest young people in their heritage and some good work is being turned out under the guidance of older carvers. Atiu, in particular, has a strong tradition of crafts both in carving and local fibre arts such as tapa. Mangaia is the source of many fine adzes carved in a distinctive, idiosyncratic style with the so-called double-k design. Mangaia also produces food pounders carved from the heavy calcite found in its extensive limestone caves.

== Carving ==
Carving was an important part of ancient Cook Islands culture, although much of this is lost. Ancient Cook Islanders carved the poles of their huts, their canoes and weapons (clubs and spears). The patterns used were the same as that used in tattooing and dyed on tapa cloth. It is believed that families had their own symbols, much like some British families have crests.

=== Staff god ===
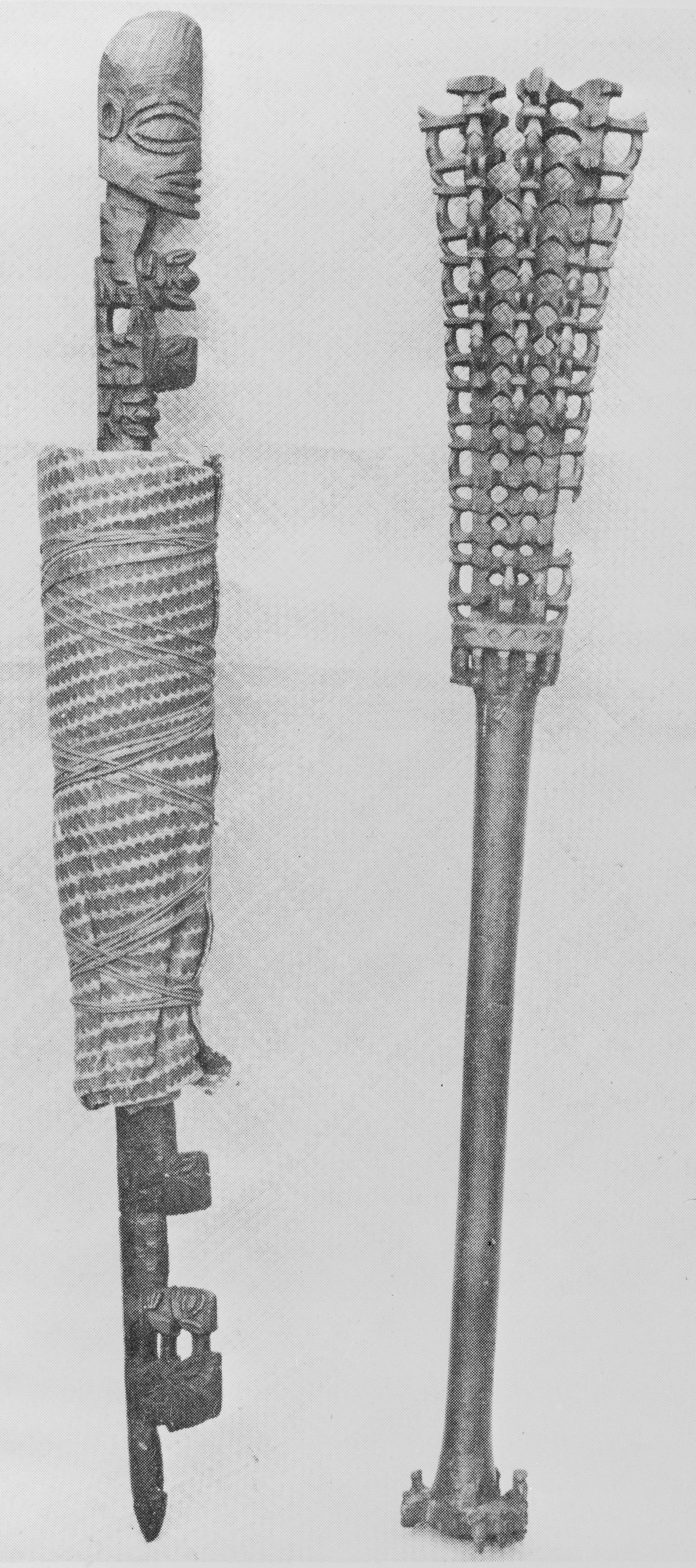
Left: Staff god (atua rakau) Right: Slab god (unu)

Cult figures called staff god or atua rakau from Rarotonga, apparently combine images of gods with their human descendants. They range in length between 28 inches (71 cm) and 18 feet (5.5 m) and were carried and displayed horizontally. At one end there is a schematized blade-shaped head and arms of the progenitive god with a succession of little figures rising from his body, alternatively full-face and in profile with penis erect. The staff itself terminated in a phallus. But this elaborately carved sexual imagery had less importance for the Rarotongans than the feathers and pieces of shell representing the soul of the god and enclosed in yards of bark cloth wound around the center of the staff.

=== Fisherman's god ===
A number of images called the fisherman's god are found in museums. These images are likely to be of the sea god Tangaroa. Their function rests solely on the authority of John Williams, who figured one of them and referred to it thus:

"An idol, of which the figure on the opposite side is a correct representation, was placed on the fore part of every fishing canoe; and when the natives were going on a fishing expedition, prior to setting off, they invariably presented offerings to the god, and invoked him to grant them success."

== Weaving ==
The outer islands produce traditional weaving of fans, mats, basketware and hats. Particularly fine examples of rito hats are worn by women to church on Sundays. They are made from the uncurled fibre of the coconut palm and are of very high quality. The Polynesian equivalent of Panama hats, they are highly valued and are keenly sought by Polynesian visitors from Tahiti. Often, they are decorated with hatbands made of minuscule pupu shells which are painted and stitched on by hand. Although pupu are found on other islands, the collection and use of them in decorative work has become a speciality of Mangaia.

== Tattoo ==
Tattooing was forbidden in the Cook Islands after the arrival of missionaries, but has recently become popular again. Historically the Cook Islands tribes or clans each usually recognized a particular fish, bird, insect or plant that was sacred to that tribe and symbolized its unity. The ritual association requires members of the clan to treat the totem with respect. Its supernatural help could also be sought in times of distress. The symbol for the centipede with a poisonous bite is a common totem of chiefs and was normally tattooed on the chief's back.

Captain James Cook recorded tatau as the Tahitian term when he arrived there in 1769, although tatau is not the only word for this art form. In some French Polynesian islands and some Cook Islands it was known as nana'o.

== Tīvaevae / Tivaivai ==
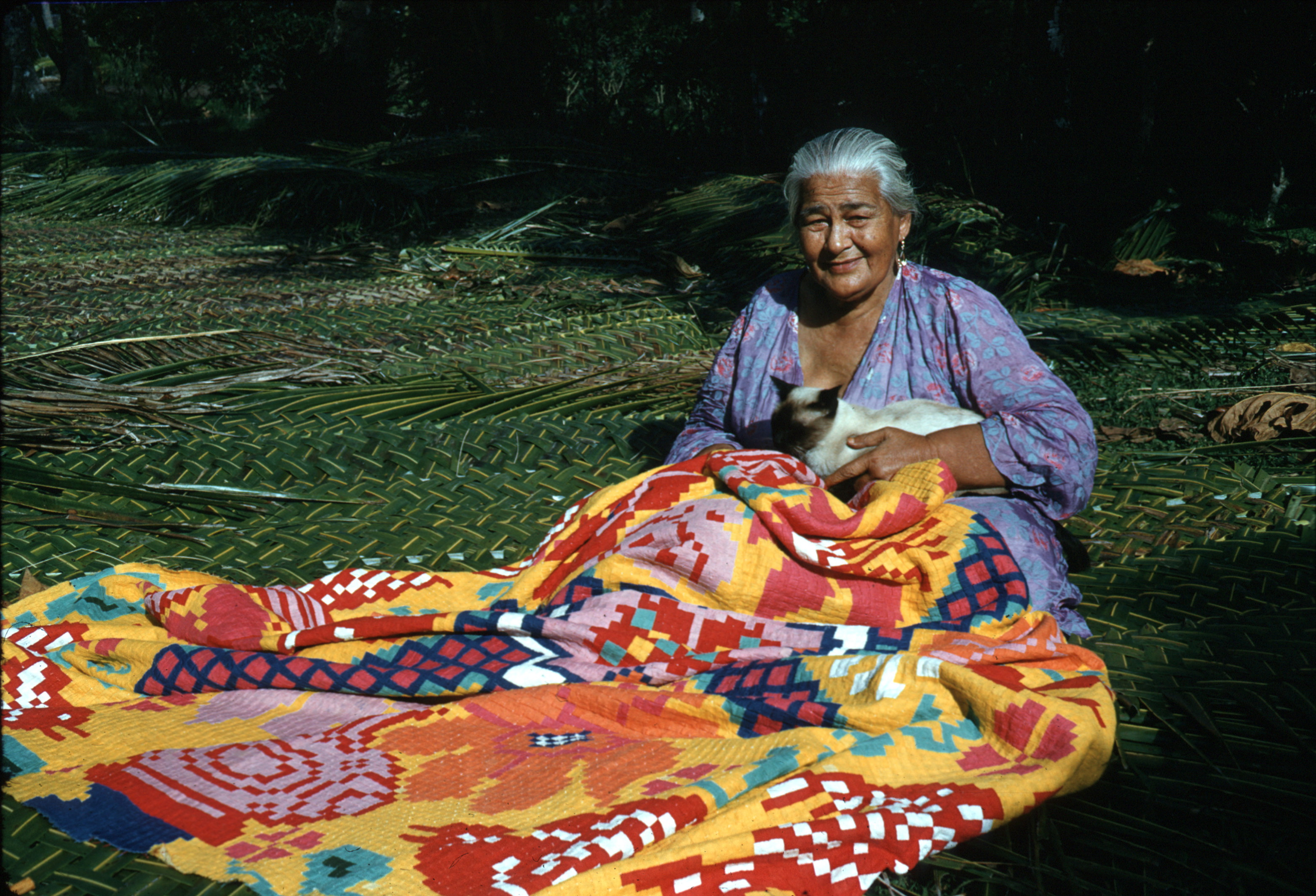
Woman sewing a tīvaevae, Rarotonga.

A major art form peculiar to the Cook Islands is tīvaevae / tivaivai. This is needlework, specifically the making of patchwork quilts by hand. The designs are stunning. These beautiful and intricate works are made by women. They have great intrinsic value and become family heirlooms.

They are often given as gifts of love and friendship. They supplanted the traditional giving of tapa cloth on ceremonial occasions such as weddings, funerals and hair-cutting. Tīvaevae / tivaivai is a communal activity and several women will work on them together. The original idea was introduced by the wives of missionaries from England and nuns from Tahiti (Tifaifai in Tahiti) who taught embroidery, needlework, sewing and crochet.

Tivaevae / tivaivai has played an important role in the daily life of Cook Island women. Since it is largely a social activity, it is nearly always carried out communally, it has had a major impact on the lives of the many women who practise it. Despite its European origin, patterns and techniques have evolved into styles which now belong quite distinctly to the Cooks. The tivaevae / tivaivai reflect the women's surroundings and usually employ designs of flowers, leaves, birds, fish, insects and animals.

Vereara Maeva-Taripo and Tungane Broadbent are important tīvaevae / tivaivai artists. Their work are in the overseas collections in Queensland Art Gallery, Christchurch Art Gallery and British Museum, as well as locally in Cook Islands National Museum.

== Contemporary art ==
Contemporary Artists Eruera Nia and Tim Buchanan are featured at the new International Terminal, Rarotonga Airport. 36 of Nia's concrete casts are positioned throughout the terminal while Buchanan's 10 metre mural farewell's passengers as they are processed through customs and security. In late 2010, two of Nia's sculptures were acquired for the permanent collection of the National Gallery of Australia.

Mahiriki Tangaroa produced a series of paintings depicting pre-Christianity gods of the Cook Islands titled Kaveinga – Angels of the Ocean, presented by Bergman Gallery in Venice, Italy as part of European Cultural Centre: Personal Structures in 2022 coinciding Venice Biennale. Other notable Contemporary Cook Islands artists includes Ian George, Kay George, Sylvia Marsters, Nina Oberg Humphries, and Joan Gragg. Mike Tavioni is an important carver. Bergman Gallery is a contemporary dealer gallery in Rarotonga that exhibits all the artists mentioned, and regularly participates in art fairs around the world, especially Aotearoa Art Fair (previously known as Auckland Art Fair).

== Gallery ==
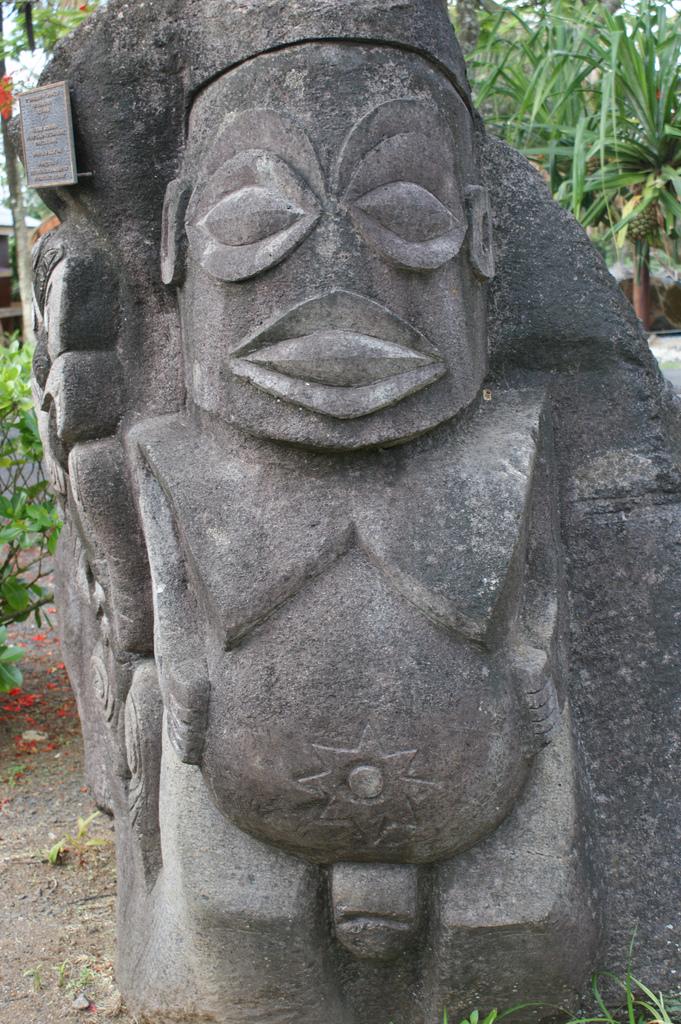
Stone sculpture

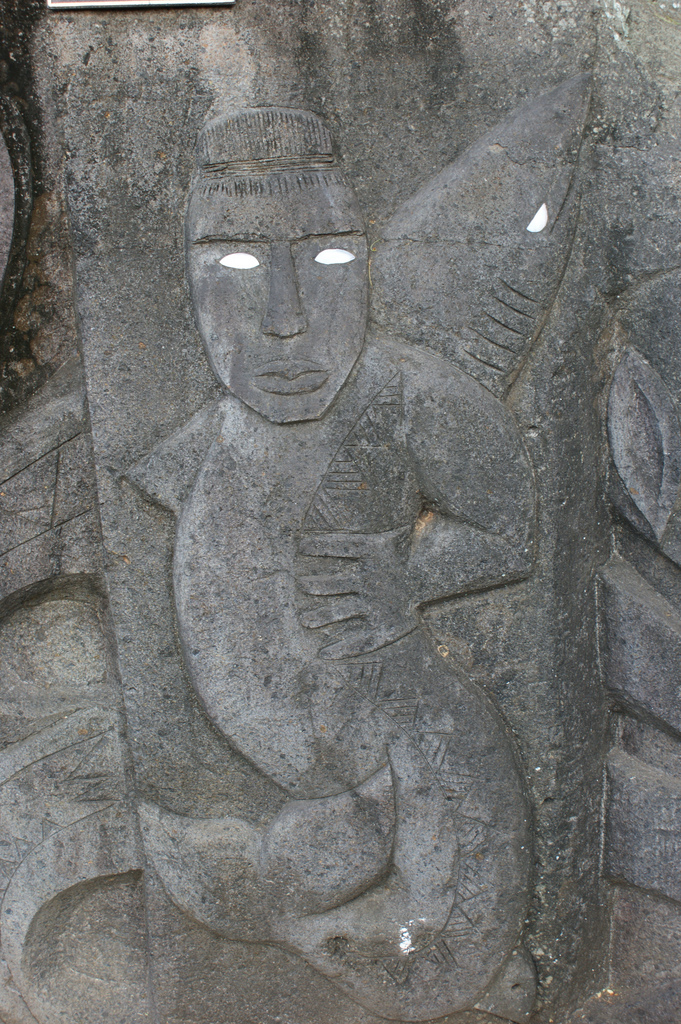
Stone carving

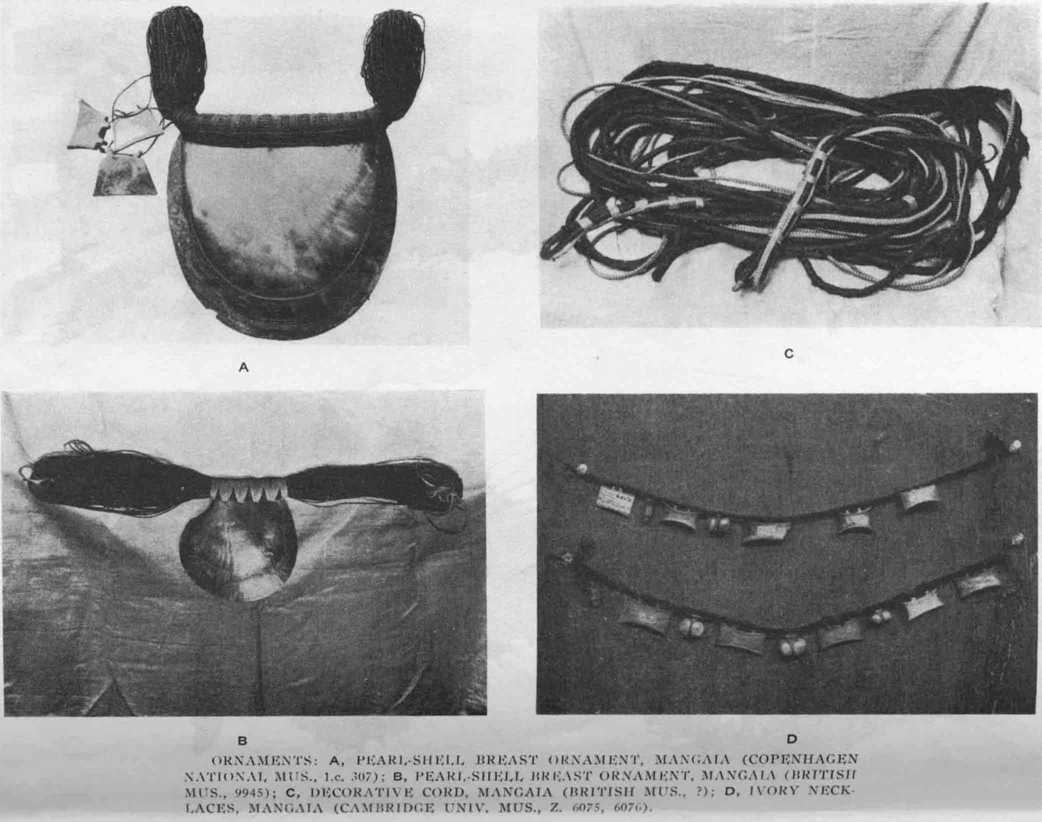
Ornaments

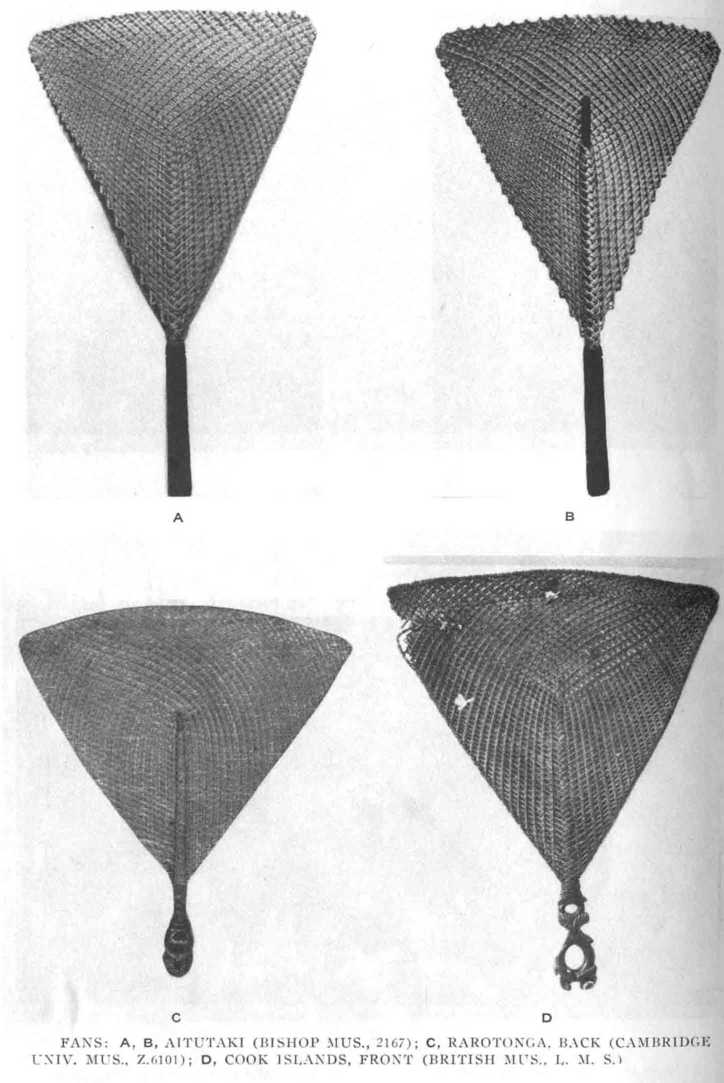
Fans

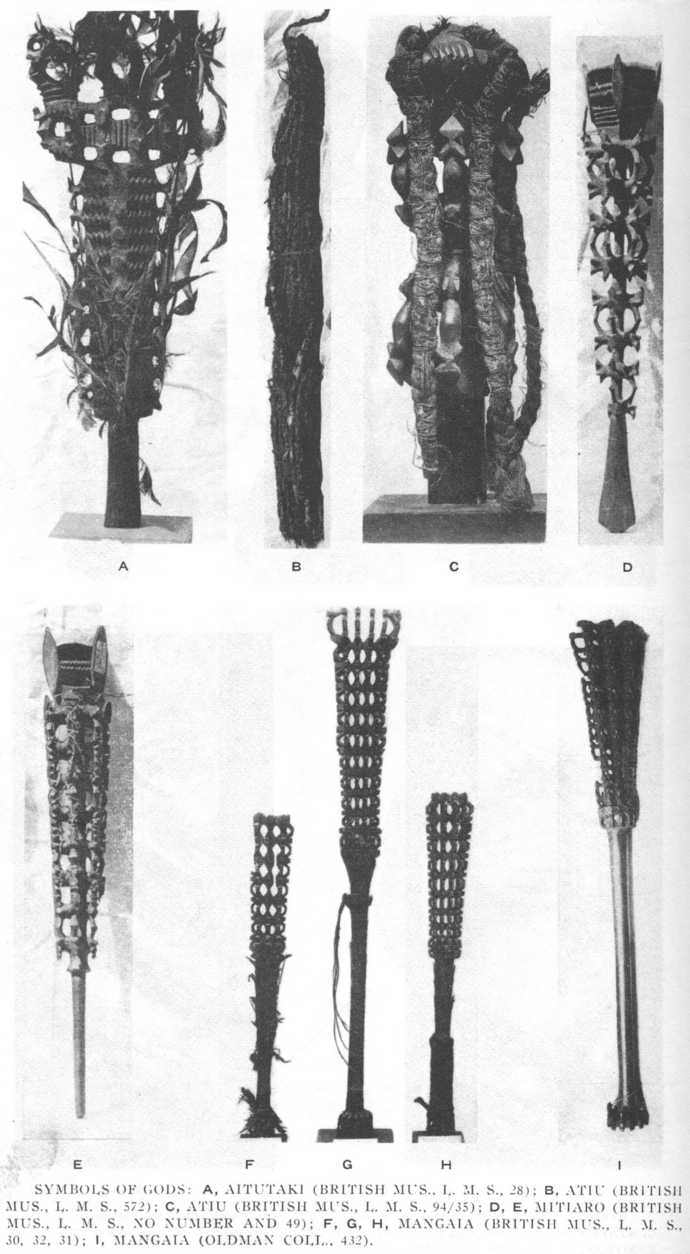
Symbols of gods

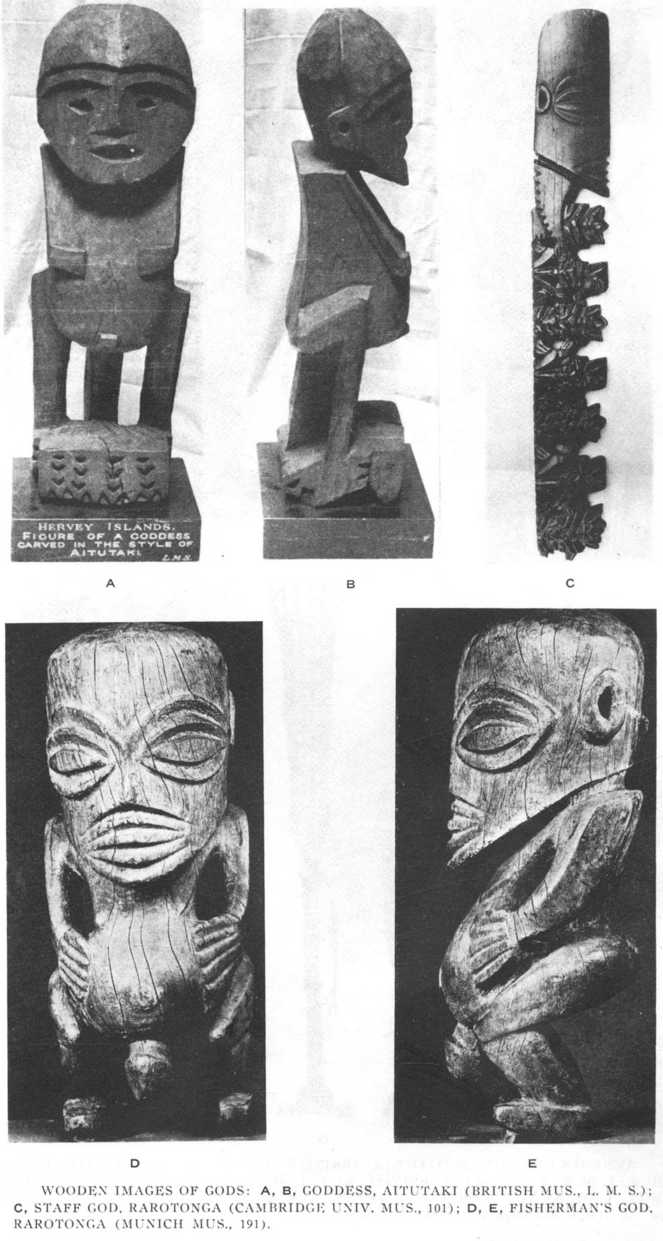
Wooden images of gods

== See also ==
- Literature of the Cook Islands
- Music of the Cook Islands
- History of the Cook Islands

== Bibliography ==
- The art of tivaevae: traditional Cook Islands quilting by Lynnsay Rongokea, John Daley (2001) ISBN 0-8248-2502-0, ISBN 978-0-8248-2502-7
- Cook Islands art by Dale Idiens, University of California (1990) ISBN 0-7478-0061-8, ISBN 978-0-7478-0061-3
- Arts and crafts of the Cook Islands: Volume 179 of Bernice P. Bishop Museum bulletin by Peter Henry Buck (1944)
