= Tungane Broadbent =

Cook Islands artist (born 1940)

- Born: Mangaia, Cook Islands
- Known for: Tivaevae / Tivaivai
- Notable work: Kaute (Hibiscus)

Tungane Broadbent (born 1940, Mangaia, Cook Islands) is a Cook Islands artist, notable for her tivaevae/tivaivai, with her career making tivaivai spanning five decades. Broadbent founded the O’oa Fabric & Fibre Arts group in 2007, Rarotonga, to teach women to sew tivaivai.

In 2006, Queensland Art Gallery commissioned her to produce a Mangaian tivaivai for the 5th Asia Pacific Triennial which is a feature of the Modern Art Gallery, hosted by Premier of Queensland Peter Beattie on behalf of the Queensland Government.

In 2015, Creative New Zealand brought Tungane Broadbent, along with five other senior artists from the Cook Islands to New Zealand to help celebrate the 50th anniversary of the Cook Islands self-governance. In the same year, Tungane had an exhibition with Vereara Maeva-Taripo in Queensland Art Gallery named Tivaevae. Kaute (Hibiscus) made by Tungane and Vereara Maeva-Taripo was acquired by Christchurch Art Gallery.

Tungane collaborated with renowned New Zealand artist Reuben Paterson three times, firstly Today, Tomorrow & Yesterday in Bergman Gallery, Rarotonga in 2017, second time Nga Meka Tui Kura in Aotearoa Art Fair, Auckland, New Zealand in 2022, and third time Nga Meka Tui Kura (Epilogue), Bergman Gallery in Rarotonga in 2023.

In 2023, Tungane designed 'Chandelier and Chalice - Mori Tautau e te Kapu Oro’a' and the tivaivai was made by the women of Atiu/Enuamanu with support from the New Zealand High Commission funds, and displayed in Cook Islands National Museum.

Tungane's work is held in many public and private collections internationally such as Cook Islands National Museum, Queensland Art Gallery, Christchurch Art Gallery, and The Arts House Trust.

== Selected solo and collaborative exhibitions ==
- 2023: Nga Meka Tui Kura (Epilogue) (with Reuben Paterson), Bergman Gallery, Rarotonga, Cook Islands
- 2022: Nga Meka Tui Kura (with Reuben Paterson), Aotearoa Art Fair, Auckland, New Zealand
- 2017: Today, Tomorrow & Yesterday (with Reuben Paterson), Bergman Gallery, Rarotonga, Cook Islands
- 2015: Tivaevae (with Vereara Maeva-Taripo), Queensland Art Gallery, Australia
- 2014: Grandmothers Legacy, BCA Gallery, Rarotonga, Cook Islands

== Selected group exhibitions ==
- 2023: Te Vaerua O Te Va'ine - Our Mother's Hands, Bergman Gallery, Auckland, New Zealand
- 2020: Tatou 2, The Story of Us, Bergman Gallery, Rarotonga, Cook Islands
- 2019: Kia Maeva Tatou, Bergman Gallery, Rarotonga, Cook Islands
- 2016: Festival of Pacific Arts & Culture, Guam
- 2006: 5th Asia Pacific Triennial, Queensland Art Gallery, Australia
