= Tongia =

Tongia is a surname. Notable people with the surname include:

- Makiuti Tongia (born 1953), Cook Islands poet, academic, diplomat, and public servant
- Ryan Tongia (born 1990), Australian rugby league and union player
- Salilo Tongia, Niuean politician
- Sione Tongia (born 1987/1988), Tongan rugby league player
