= Aline Amaru =

Tahitian artist (born 1941)

Aline Amaru (born 1941) is a textile artist from Tahiti, French Polynesia. She is self-taught. She specializes in creating a traditional Tahitian appliqué quilt known as tifaifai, and is especially known for her paumotu stitch, which she learned from her mother.

Her work is in the permanent collection of the Queensland Art Gallery, and has previously been shown at the Festival of Pacific Arts and displayed in Belau National Museum. She has also exhibited her work in Papeete, where she is a part of the Papeete Arts and Crafts Village.

She has collaborated with Urahuimarama Esau.

== Personal life ==
Amaru was born in 1941 in Tahiti. Her husband descends from the Pōmare dynasty.

== Works ==
- La Famille Pomare (1991) – a depiction of the Pōmare dynasty, made using the tifaifai pa'oti technique
