= Cook Islands literature =

Written Cook Islands literature (as distinct from oral literature) has in some ways been a precursor to the development of Pacific Islands literature. Cook Islander Florence Frisbie was one of the Pacific Islands' first writers, publishing her autobiographical story Miss Ulysses of Puka Puka in 1948. Tongareva poet Alistair Te Ariki Campbell published his first collection, Mine Eyes Dazzle, in 1950 (Christchurch: Pegasus Press). In 1960, Cook Islanders Tom Davis and Lydia Davis published Makutu, "perhaps the first novel by South Pacific Island writers".

Pacific Islands literature began to emerge throughout the region in the late 1960s and in the 1970s, largely through the medium of the South Pacific Arts Society (founded at the University of the South Pacific in 1973) and of its literary magazines. Cook Islands poet Makiuti Tongia first published his work in the Society's journal Mana.

Other noted Cook Islands writers include poet Kauraka Kauraka, children's author Teupoko'ina Utanga Morgan, and poet Audrey Brown-Pereira.

== Sources ==
- "English in the South Pacific", John Lynch and France Mugler, University of the South Pacific

== See also ==
- Art of the Cook Islands
- Music of the Cook Islands
