= Wang Zhiwen (calligrapher) =

Chinese micro-calligrapher (born 1962)

Wang Zhiwen (Chinese: 王芝文; pinyin: Wáng Zhīwén, born 1962 in Chenghai, Guangdong) is a Chinese micro-calligrapher. He was once invited by the China Cultural Center in Sydney to the Mosman High School on September 17, 2014. His works were once displayed as part of the China-Canada Cultural Exchange Year 2015-2016 event at Toronto, Canada, as well as the Clore Education Centre of The British Museum. An autobiography of him is located at the Smithsonian Institution.
