= Tivaevae =

Polynesian form of artistic quilting

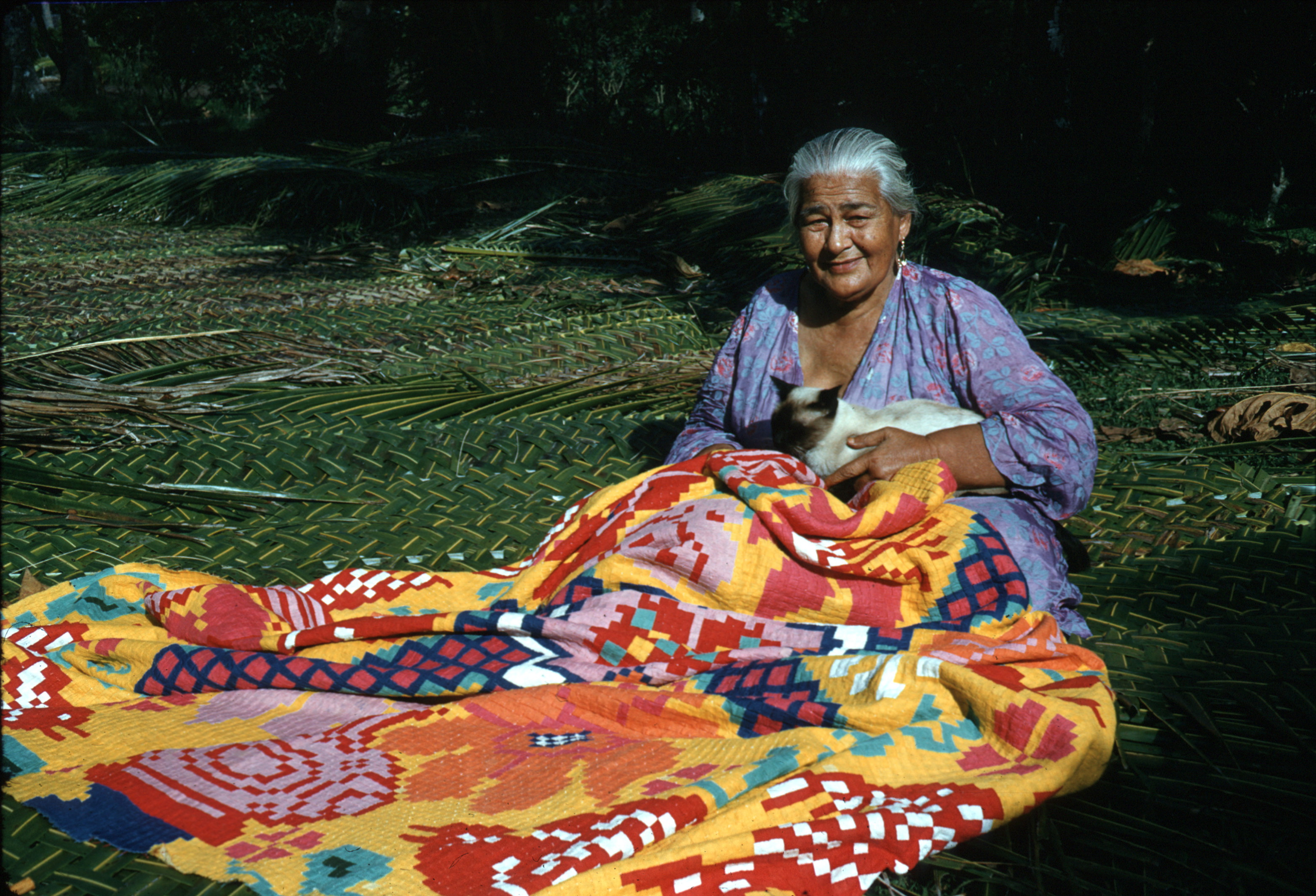
Woman sewing a tivaevae, Rarotonga

Tivaevae or tivaivai (Cook Islands Māori: tīvaevae) in the Cook Islands, tifaifai in French Polynesia, is a form of artistic quilting traditionally done by Polynesian women. The word literally means "patches", in reference to the pieces of material sewn together. The tivaevae are either made by one woman or can be created in groups of women called vainetini. The vainetini use this time together to bond, sing and catch up on village news.

== Traditional uses ==
Tivaevae are often given on very special occasions either to important visitors, as birthday and wedding gifts or used to cover the body of a loved one who has died. They are often displayed during important events like the traditional boys' hair-cutting ceremonies, birthdays and weddings.

By custom, a tivaevae is not measured by monetary value nor production cost. Its value is said to be reflected by the love and patience that the creator(s) have put into making a stunning work of art. Cook Islands women often described their tivaevae as being "something from the heart". Artist Vereara Maeva-Taripo has described tivaevae as central to the identity of Cook Islands women.

Tivaevae are rarely seen for sale on the islands. The Atiu Fibre Arts Studio on Atiu is the only place in the Cook Islands where they are commercially produced and available for purchase.

== History ==
The tivaevae's origins are uncertain. Rongokea (1992) believes it to be an imported art form, and cites two sets of Christian missionaries in the 19th century as possible origins. While it is known that these female missionaries taught the indigenous women how to sew, it is not certain that they taught them the craft of quilting or making bed coverlets. The appliqué style of tivaevae quilting appears to have been influenced by Pennsylvanian German scherenschnitte or Victorian folded paper-cutting traditions. Multiple origins and influences thus seem likely.

As an art form, tivaevae replaced barkcloth production in Tahiti and the Cook Islands by the late 19th century: the function and nature of barkcloth production was transferred to tivaevae. Vereara Maeva-Taripo and Tungane Broadbent are important tivaevae artists of today from the Cook Islands, and both artists have been displayed in Queensland Art Gallery and are in the collection in Cook Islands National Museum and Queensland Art Gallery, as well as Christchurch Art Gallery.

== Notable artists ==
- Aline Amaru (born 1941), Tahitian
- Tungane Broadbent (born 1940)
- Ani O'Neill (born 1971), Aotearoa New Zealand (Cook Island and Irish descent)
- Vereara Maeva-Taripo (1940–2019), Cook Islands
