= National Library of the Cook Islands =

National Library in Avarua, Cook Islands

- Runanga Puka
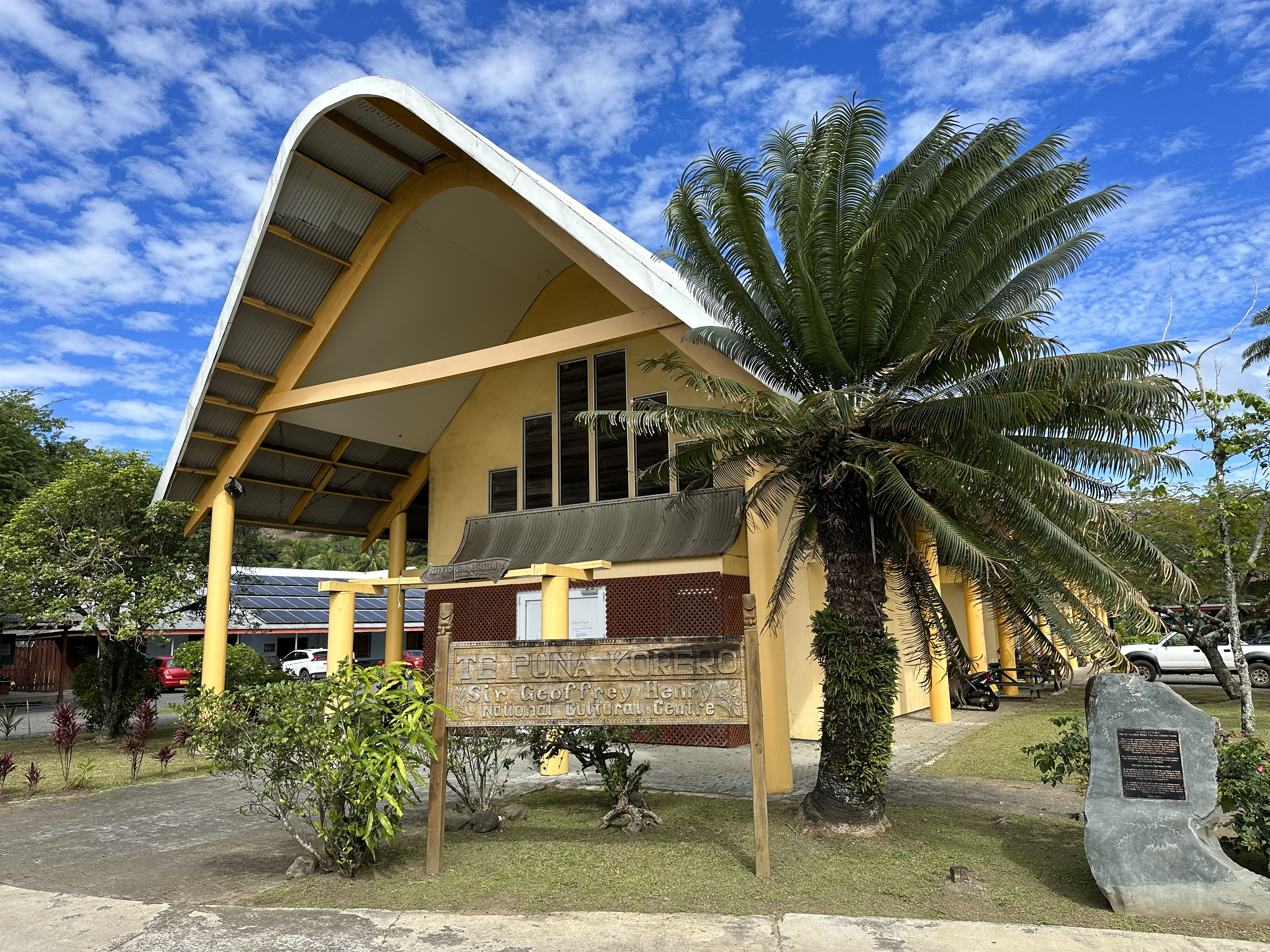
- 21.206894°S 159.769364°W
- Location: Victoria Road, Avarua, Rarotonga, Cook Islands
- Branch of: Ministry of Cultural Development

The National Library of the Cook Islands – Runanga Puka, part of Te Puna Korero – Sir Geoffrey Henry Culture Centre, is the national library of the Cook Islands. The building was opened in 1993, and is next to a similar building that houses the Cook Islands National Museum. The centre also contains an auditorium and several government ministries.

== History ==
Planning for the library began in 1961, with a committee backed by the Resident Commissioner Oliver Dare. A site on Taputapuatea was donated by the Makea Nui Ariki and the Parliament of the Cook Islands agreed to match donations with public money. Plans for the library were drawn up by New Zealand Ministry of Works architect Kenneth Mills. The construction of the building was eventually funded by a loan from the Government of Nauru. Renovations were carried out in 2021.

The library was however not established until 1992, becoming operational in 1993. The library holds a collection of around 10,000 books, including both children's and adult's fiction, reference books, Cook Islands and Pacific reports, and Pacific rare books. The library has two employees, neither of whom are qualified librarians due to a lack of training opportunities on the island.

A bid was started to make the library a legal deposit library in 2012, however this was put on hold due to the 50th anniversary of the island's independence. In 2019, the Cook Islands Parliament donated volumes detailing the laws of the islands between 1965 and 1994.

== See also ==
- List of national libraries
