= Fibre Gallery =

Art gallery in Christchurch, New Zealand

- Interactive map of the Fibre Gallery area

General information
- Type: Public art gallery
- Location: Level 1, 285 Cashel Street Christchurch Central, Christchurch, New Zealand
- Coordinates: 43°31′59″S 172°38′41″E
- Owner: Tagata Moana Trust

Design and construction
- Known for: New Zealand Pacific Art

Website
- https://www.tagatamoana.com/fibre-gallery

Fibre Gallery is a Pacific Gallery based in Christchurch, New Zealand, run by Pasifika New Zealanders to serve South Island's Pacific community. The gallery is owned by the Tagata Moana Trust. Fibre Gallery is founded by Nina Oberg Humphries.

== History ==
In 2022, Nina Oberg Humphries founded Fibre Gallery in Christchurch, so that there is a gallery space for New Zealand Pacific artists and education.

The inaugural exhibition features Filipe Tohi, Dagmar Dyck and Stone Maka, titled Patterns of the Past – Formatting the Future. Oberg Humphries stated that she wanted Fibre Gallery to show Pacific artists from all over New Zealand and at least 50% of the works to be from artists of South Island.

== Present ==
In 2024, Fibre Gallery had an exhibition to mark 50th years since of dawn raids begin titled Lotogatasi o Tagata. The exhibition also touches upon Restoring Citizenship Removed by Citizenship (Western Samoa) Act 1982 Bill, that granted Samoans citizenship for people born between 1924 and 1949, and how that bill was removed by Western Samoa Citizenship Act 1982. The exhibition was about Samoans in New Zealand fighting to be recognised as New Zealand citizens, and also how even after the apologies of the dawn raids in 2021, the dawn raids tactics still continued.

In 2024, Auckland artist of Tongan descent, Tui Emma Gillies, recently had an exhibition criticising artificial intelligence that attracted media attention.
