= Staff god =

Sacred objects of the Cook Islands Māori

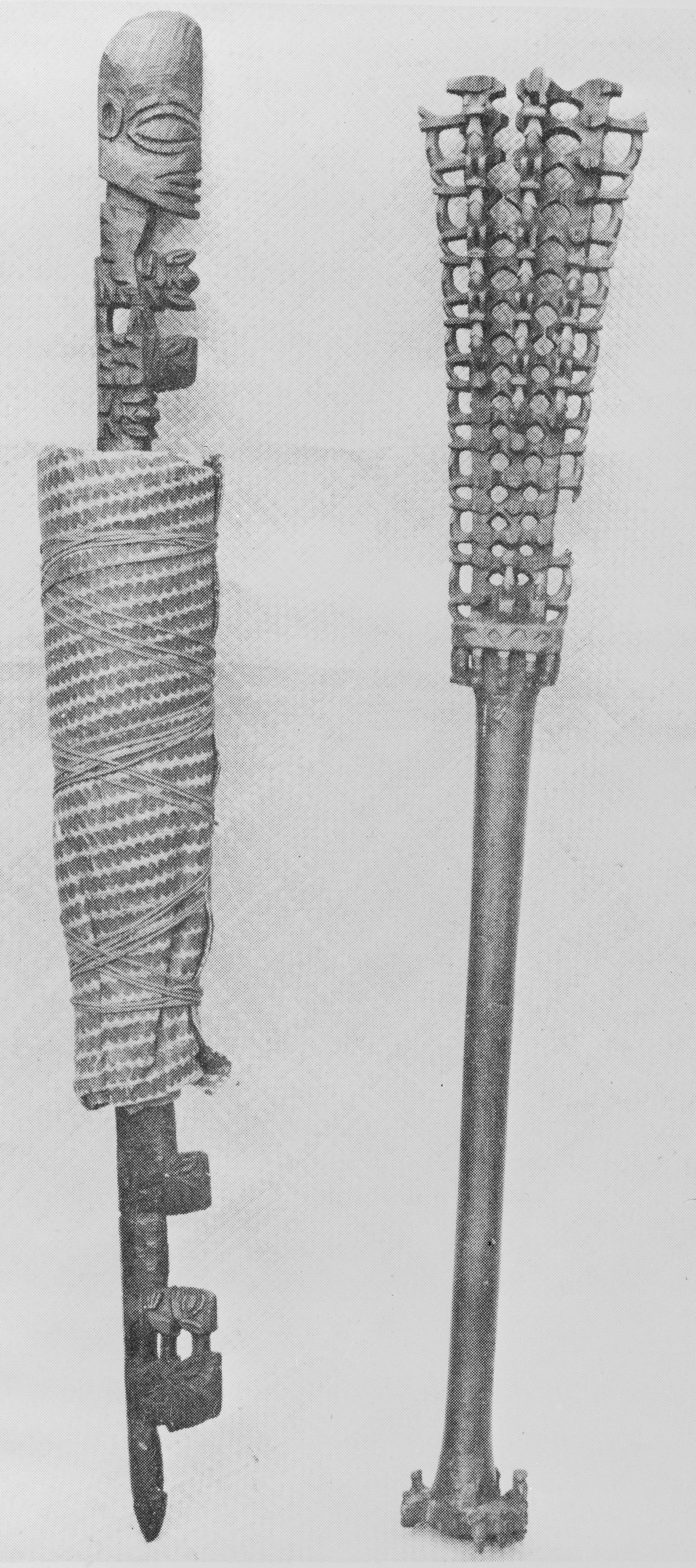
Left: Staff god (atua rakau) Right: Slab god (unu)

Staff gods (or atua rakau) are sacred objects within the cultural and spiritual practices of the Cook Islands Māori, particularly prominent on the island of Rarotonga. These objects were crafted from wood and adorned with intricate carvings and symbolic designs, combining images of gods with their human descendants. The staffs range in length between 28 inches (71 cm) and 18 feet (5.5 m) and were carried and displayed horizontally.

At one end there, staff gods might have a schematized blade-shaped head and arms of the progenitive god with a succession of little figures rising from his body, alternatively full-face and in profile with penis erect. The staff itself terminated in a phallus. But this elaborately carved sexual imagery had less importance for the Rarotongans than the feathers and pieces of shell representing the soul of the god and enclosed in yards of bark cloth (tapa) wound around the center of the staff.

== History ==
During the 19th century, the arrival of the missionaries from Europe to the Cook Islands saw the burning of staff gods to make way for Christianity. Some missionaries reported seeing a staff god as large as 6 metres long.

British Museum has the only surviving staff god with full bark cloth (tapa) intact that predates the arrival of European missionaries. The central wooden staff consists of a large Tangaroa and smaller male and female figures on one side, and on the other side, a naturalistic penis, is missing.

Staff gods without the bark cloth wrappings can be found all over the world. Such as Metropolitan Museum of Art, Israel Museum, and Museum of New Zealand Te Papa Tongarewa.

In 2014, one Rarotongan staff god was auctioned for 1.2 million euros in Paris.

== Present ==
Nina Oberg Humphries is a contemporary New Zealand and Cook Islands artist who recreates contemporary versions of ancient Rarotongan staff gods to tell stories of the Cook Islands diasporas in New Zealand.
