= Cook Islands National Museum =

Museum in Avarua, Cook Islands

Coordinates: 21.2068°S 159.7698°W

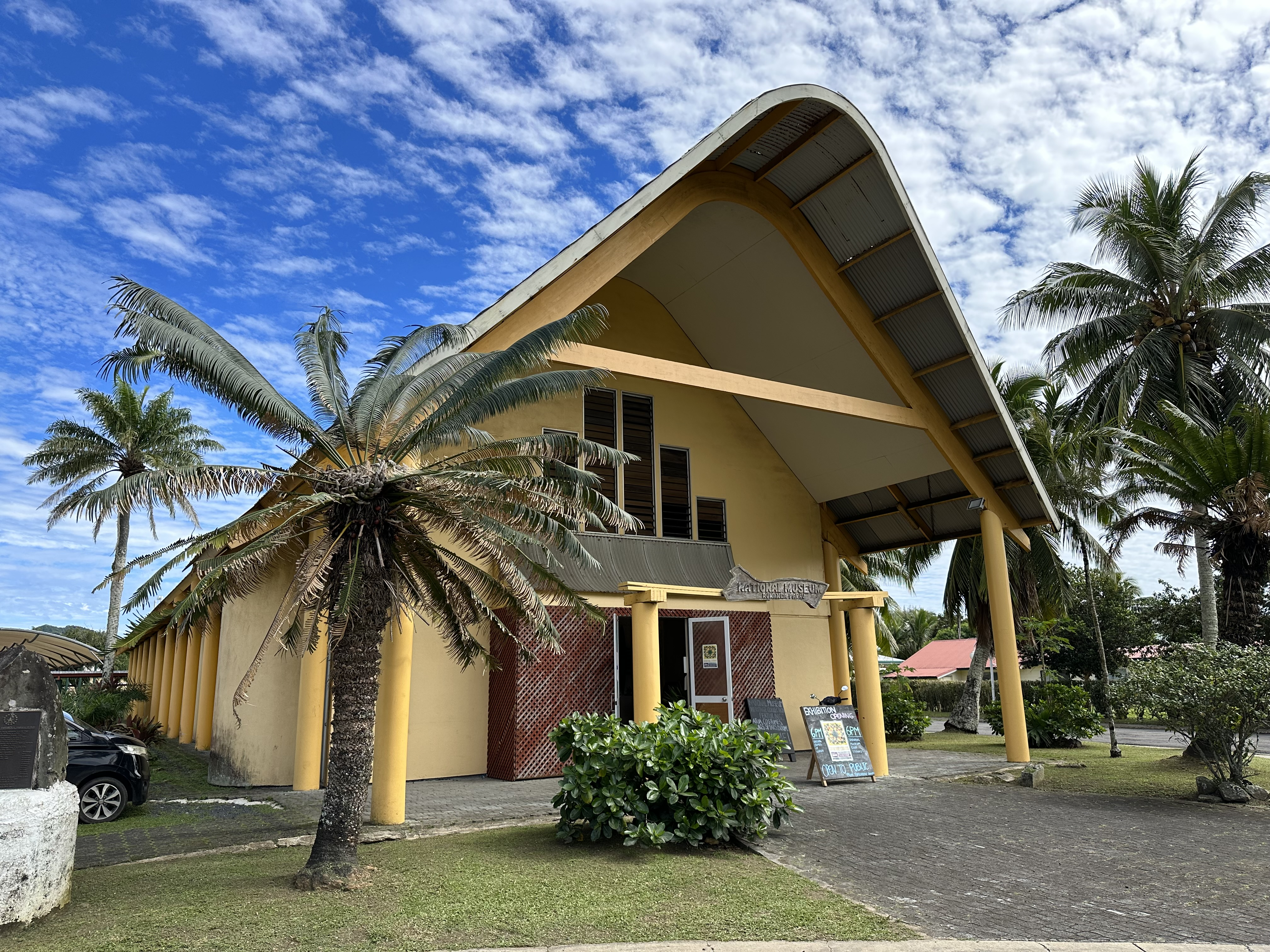
- Formation: 1992
- Type: Governmental organisation
- Purpose: Heritage preservation
- Headquarters: Victoria Road, Avarua
- Location: Cook Islands

The Cook Islands National Museum (Cook Islands Māori: Runanga Pakau) is part of the Sir Geoffrey Henry National Culture Centre in Avarua on Rarotonga, in the Cook Islands. Its collection includes contemporary and historic artefacts, as well as replicas of objects in foreign institutions. Next to it is a similar building that houses the National Library of the Cook Islands.

== Background ==
A purpose-built museum building was opened on 14 October 1992, in order to protect and encourage understanding of the cultural heritage of the Cook Islands. The museum had previously been housed in a section of the National Library. The museum has a 200 m^{2} display space, as well as an office and store.

== Exhibitions ==
In 2019 the museum hosted an exhibition by Chinese micro-calligrapher Wang Zhiwen. Other exhibitions have included: on vaka voyaging history; on the contributions of Cook Islanders in the First World War; costumes from the 2018 Miss Cook Islands pageant; photographs by Fe'ena Syme-Buchanan that highlight population decline on Mangaia; on tivaivai – a form of quilting specific to the Cook Islands; wooden sculpture from Pacific countries; as well as many others.

== Collection ==
The museum collection contains objects relating to the Cook Islands and other Pacific nations. In 1999 the collection comprised approximately 300 objects, mostly dating to after 1900. It includes archaeological material, including 800 year old fish hooks excavated from Moturakau, Aitutaki. Similar objects, which remain the property of the museum, were excavated in 2003 from the motu Te Kainga of Rakahanga. Other objects in the museum's collection include ceremonial adzes, and a seven-foot long ceremonial spear. The collection also includes replica objects from a variety of islands. In 2020 the museum investigated whether it would be able to acquire a newly discovered sketch of Mangaia, painted by Captain Cook's surgeon.

== Repatriation ==
The Cook Islands National Museum has actively requested that 'smaller provincial collections in the UK consider repatriating Cook Island material'. In 1999 two necklaces were returned to the Cook Islands, following a request to Angus Council by the museum. At the time, the council's decision was based on the view that the necklaces "had been donated at a time when the museum collected anything and everything from every corner of the globe, and neither has been on lengthy display in recent years". Writer and curator Neil G. W. Curtis described this example of repatriation as Scottish "post-colonial empathy".

Adzes in particular were a popular item for early explorers, and later seamen and tourists, to collect, so appear in many collections around the world. In 2017 several stone adzes were returned to the Cook Islands from a private collection. They had been received as a gift by the former superintendent of Aitutaki Airfield. The family returned to New Zealand, but felt that the objects should return to the Cook Islands.

Many museums collections around the world hold objects from the Cook Islands, including tapa cloth held by Kew Gardens, adzes and tattooing instruments at the Wellcome Collection, and many objects, including a cloak, at Te Papa.

=== Gallery of objects held in overseas collections ===
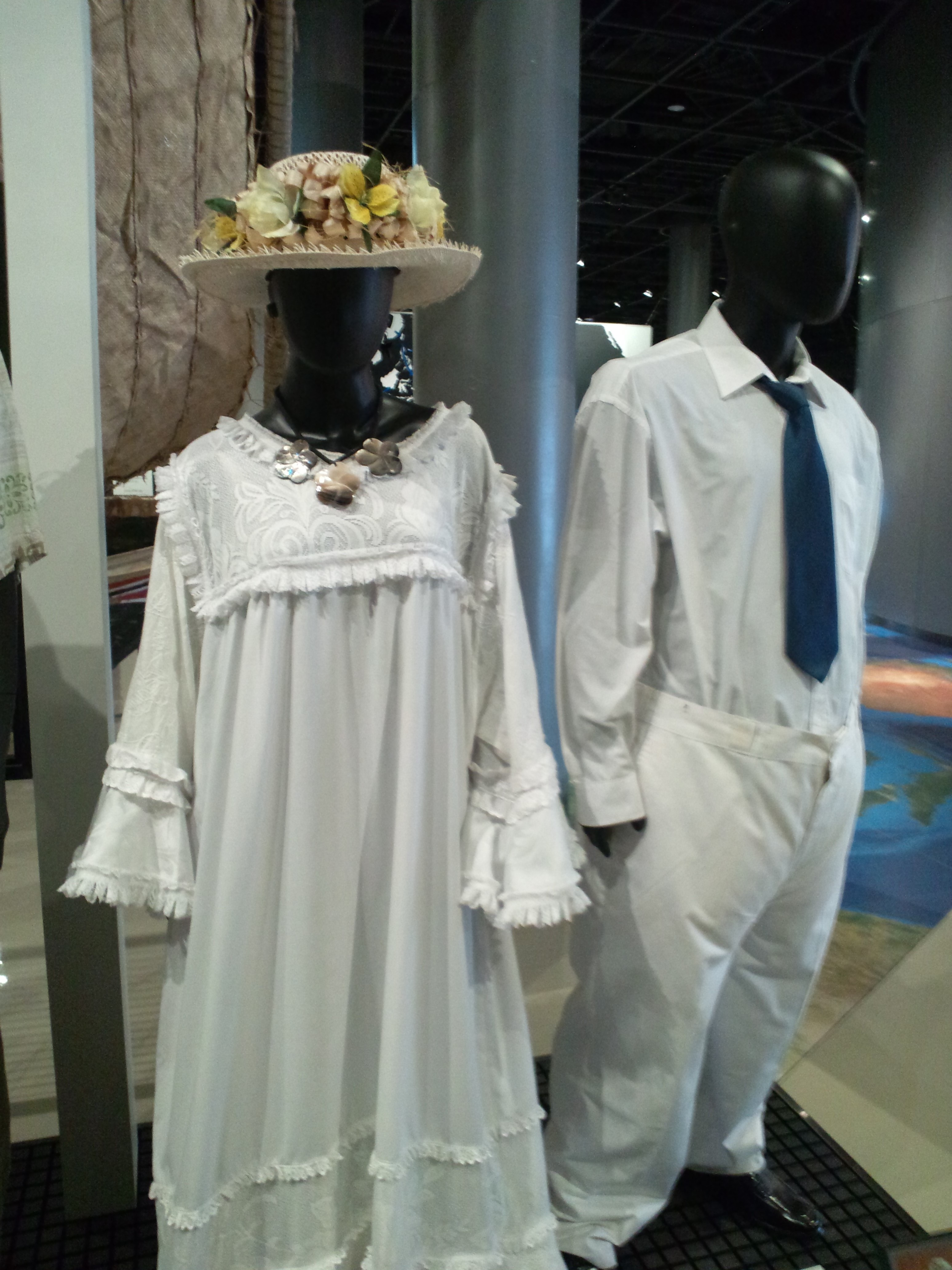
Clothes worn when attending church in National Museum of Ethnography, Osaka

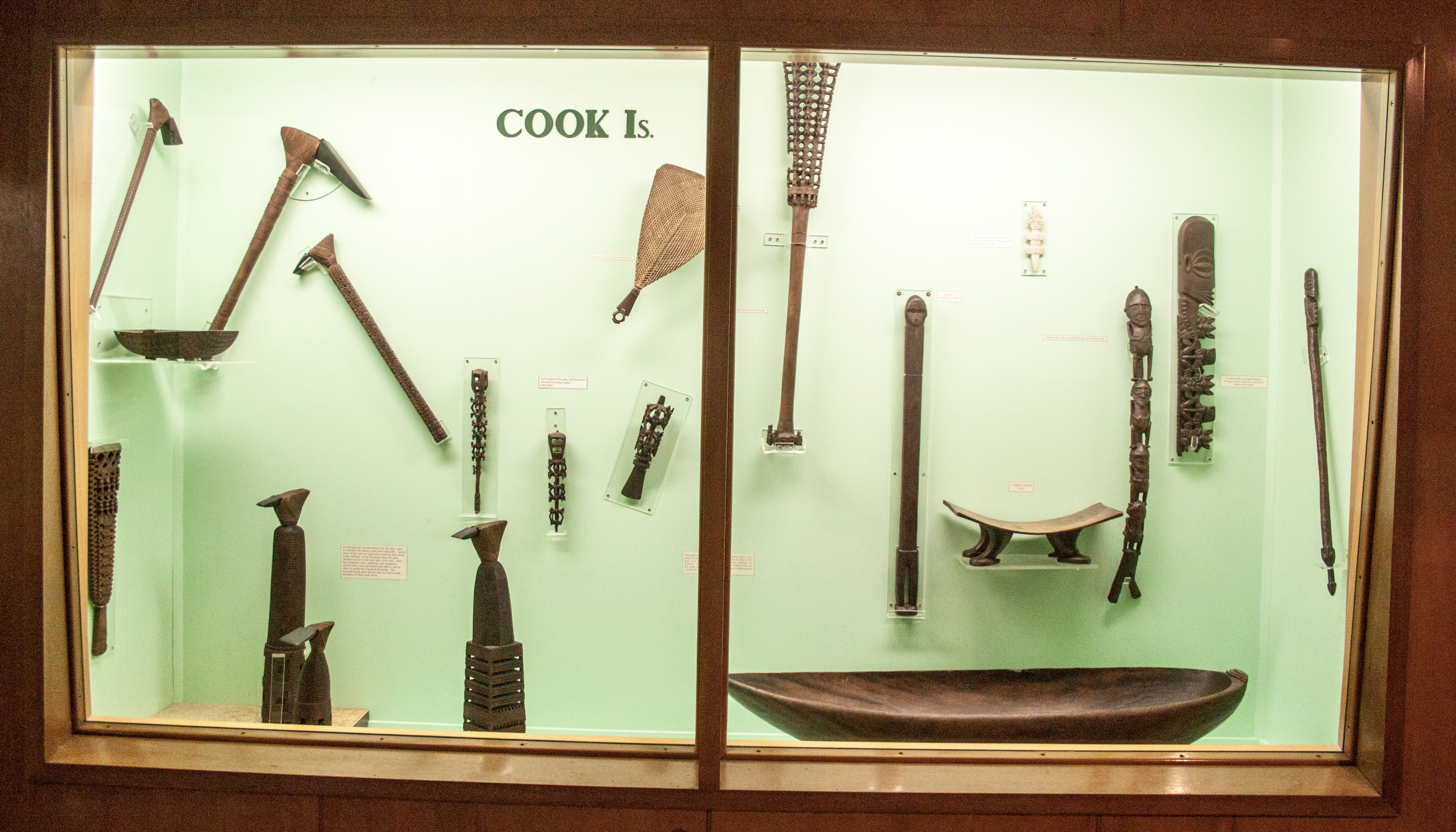
Cook Islands objects in Otago Museum

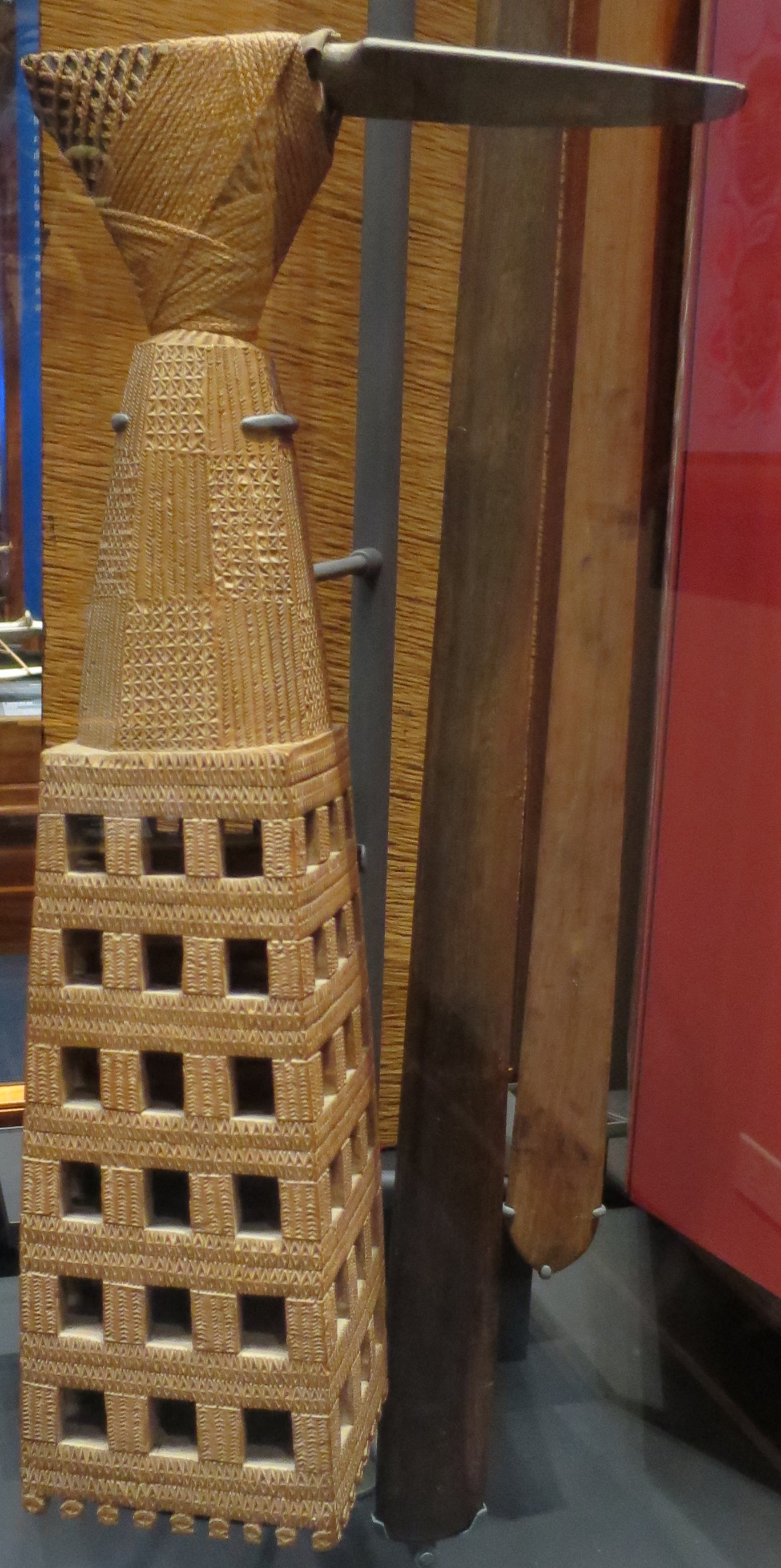
Ceremonial adze in Bishop Museum

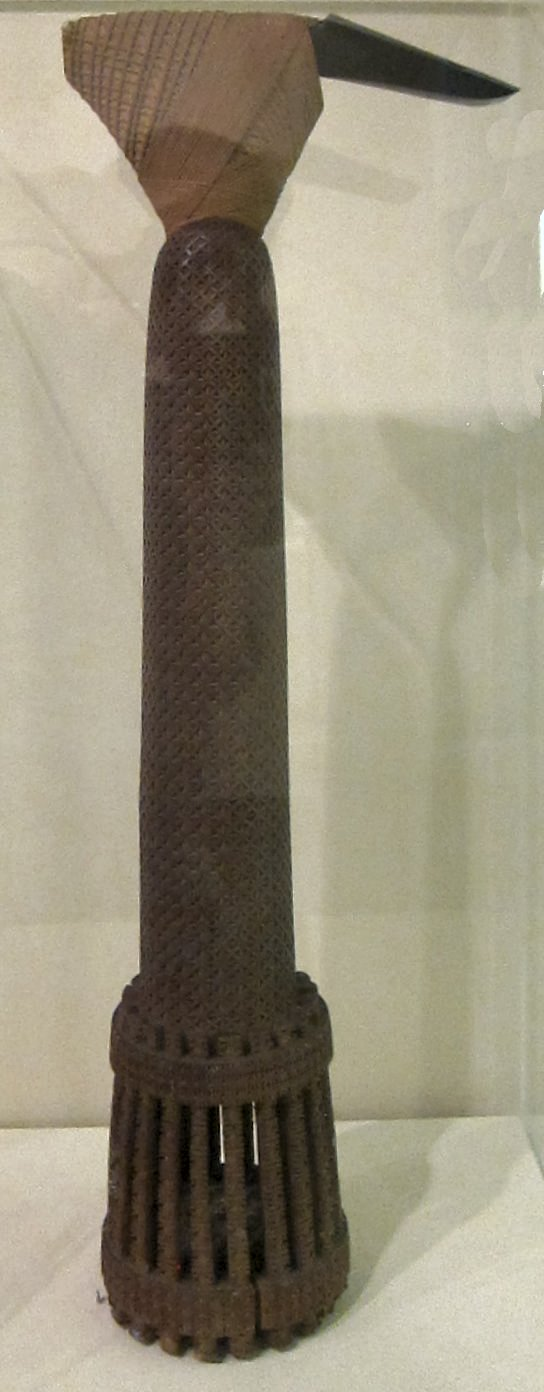
Ceremonial adze in Honolulu Museum of Art

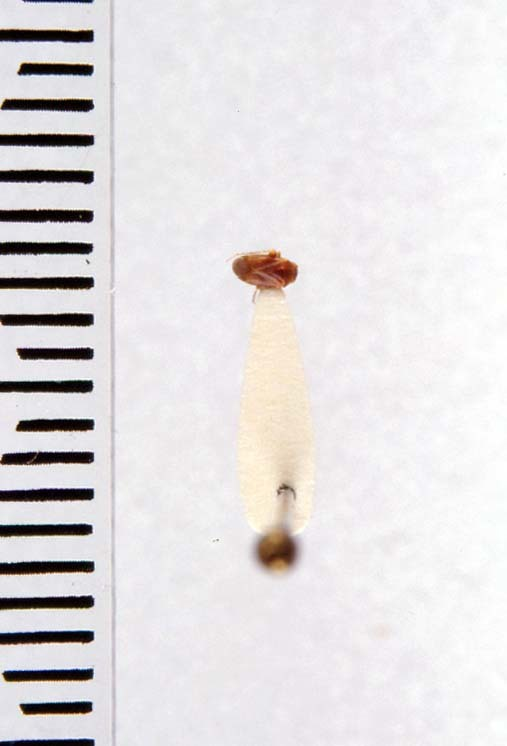
Holotype of Campylomma cookensis (mullein bug) in Auckland War Memorial Museum

== Notable people ==
- Jean Mason – curator
- Arerangi Tongia – former director
- Makiuti Tongia – former director
