= Microcalligraphy (Chinese) =

- Traditional Chinese: 微書
- Simplified Chinese: 微书
- Literal meaning: Micro-script
Transcriptions
Standard Mandarin
- Hanyu Pinyin: Wēi shū
- Wade–Giles: Wei1 Shu1
- Tongyong Pinyin: Wei shu
- IPA: weɪʂú
Yue: Cantonese
- Yale Romanization: mèih syū
- Jyutping: Mei4 Shu1

Microcalligraphy is a Chinese art form that involves writing small Chinese characters on porcelain with a brush. The characters can form different shapes.
