= Nina Oberg Humphries =

New Zealand artist

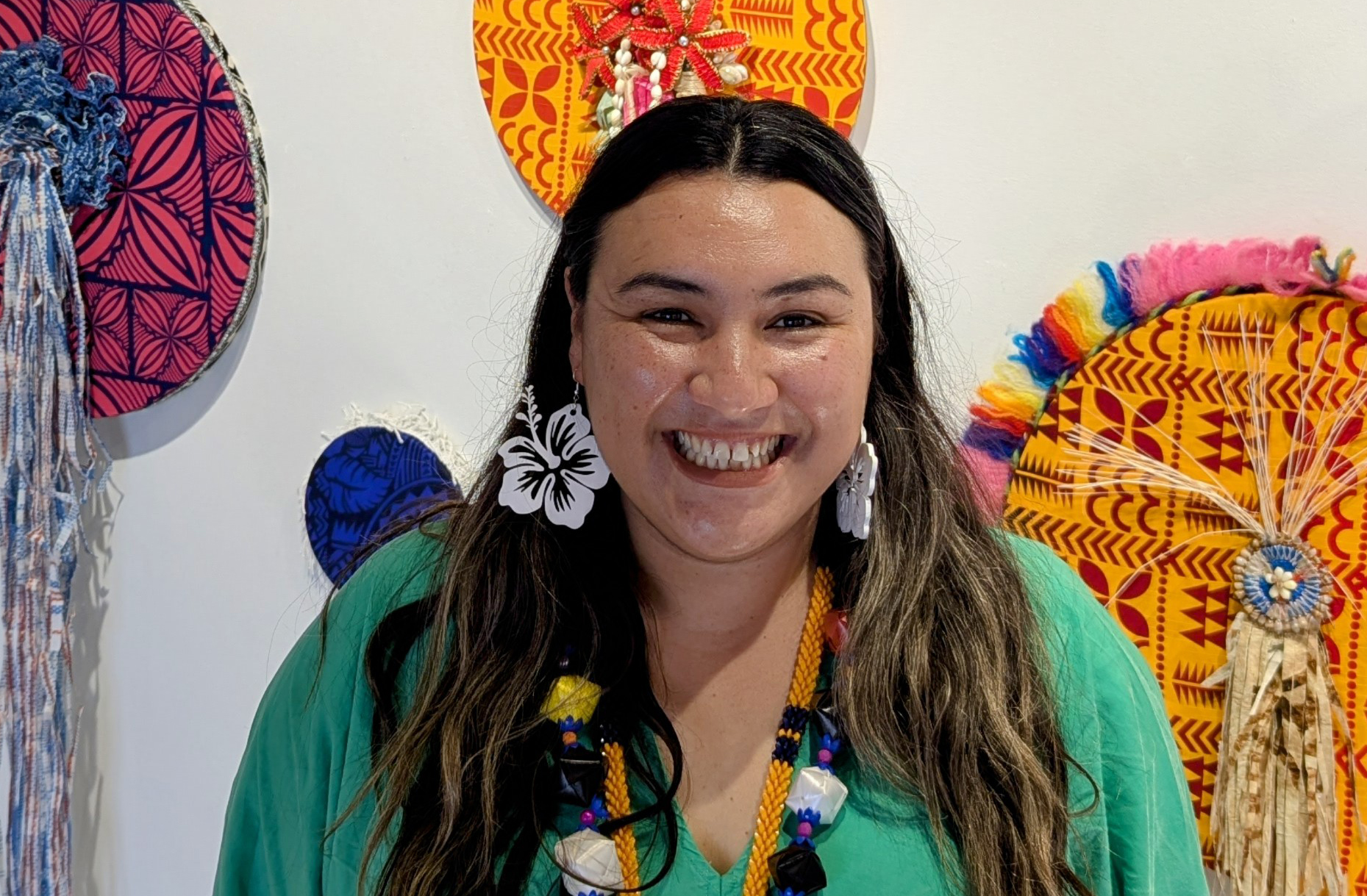
- Born: 1990 (age 35–36); Christchurch, New Zealand
- Education: Ilam School of Fine Arts, University of Canterbury
- Known for: Pacific Arts advocacy, multimedia art
- Style: Contemporary interpretation of Cook Islands artefacts

Nina Oberg Humphries (born 1990) is a New Zealand multimedia artist and Pacific arts advocate and multimedia artist of Cook Islands descent. Born in Christchurch in 1990, Oberg Humphries graduated from Ilam School of Fine Arts at the University of Canterbury in 2015.

Oberg Humphries co-founded Fibre Gallery in Christchurch, a space for Pacific artists and the first gallery of its kind in the South Island, a place where Pacific peoples can learn about their heritage and their cultures. Fibre Gallery was established by Oberg Humphires because there were no platforms for Pacific artists to have opportunities, and there are not many Pacific art being displayed in Christchurch. She is also a deputy chair for SCAPE Public Art board, an organisation that installs public art across Christchurch, as a voice for the Pacific community.

Oberg Humphries is a director and co-founder of Tagata Moana Trust, a not-for-profit organisation committed to advocating for and empowering Pacific peoples through community resources, events and policies to highlight and strengthen the visibility and identity of Pacific people in New Zealand.

Oberg Humphries' artistic practice works with predominately Cook Islands spiritual items (taura atua), items of pre-colonial times, such as ancient Rarotongan staff gods (atua rakau), and interrogates how the knowledge, and spirituality with multiple indigenous gods is largely disappearing in the Cook Islands, and what taura atua means to her. Oberg Humphries' work reflects her dual cultural heritage of Pākehā (New Zealand European) and the Cook Islands, and what it means to be a second-generation Cook Islander in New Zealand. Oberg Humphries invites members of the Pacific diaspora in New Zealand to engage with the artefacts of taura atua and recall their own stories of living and growing up in New Zealand.

In 2023, Oberg Humphries was awarded Kiwi Bank New Zealander of the Year Awards, Local Hero for her services to Pacific Arts in South Island, New Zealand.

== Collections ==
Oberg Humphries' works is held in many public collections throughout New Zealand including Christchurch Art Gallery, University of Canterbury, and Arts House Trust.

== Residencies ==
- 2021 - Mana Moana Experience Programme, Leadership New Zealand and Creative New Zealand
- 2020 - Pacific Artist in Residence, University of Canterbury's Macmillan Brown Centre for Pacific Studies.

== Selected solo exhibitions ==
- 2025: Collision, Bergman Gallery, Auckland, New Zealand
- 2023: Taura, Bergman Gallery, Rarotonga, Cook Islands
- 2022: Taumauri, Bartley + Company, Wellington, New Zealand
- 2022: Avaiki (A Place of Remembering), part of Te Wheke: Pathways Across Oceania, Christchurch Art Gallery, New Zealand
- 2020: Ta'ai, The Physics Room, Christchurch, New Zealand
- 2017: I Call to Her, Summer performance series, Centre of Contemporary Art, Christchurch, New Zealand
- 2015: Lilia, Centre of Contemporary Art, Christchurch, New Zealand

== Selected group exhibitions ==
- 2023: Ta Mataora, Bergman Gallery, Rarotonga, Cook Islands
- 2023: Te Vaerua O Te Vaine, Our Mother's Hands, Bergman Gallery, Auckland, New Zealand
- 2023: Aotearoa Art Fair, The Cloud, Auckland, New Zealand
- 2022: Te Atuitanga Beneath Our Cloak of Stars, Bergman Gallery, Auckland, New Zealand
- 2017: INFLUX, PATAKA Art + Museum, Wellington, New Zealand
- 2016: INFLUX, St Paul St Gallery, Auckland, New Zealand
