= Makiuti Tongia =

Cook Islands poet, academic, and diplomat

Makiuti Tongia (born 1953) is a Cook Islands poet, academic, diplomat, and public servant. He is the first Cook Islander published in the Cook Islands, and considered to be a trail-blazer in Cook Islands literature and a key figure in the creation of a Pacific literary tradition.

Tongia was born in Rarotonga and educated at Tereora College and the University of the South Pacific, graduating with a Bachelor of Arts in Sociology, Pacific History and Creative Writing. He won a Fulbright scholarship and studied at Ohio State University and Western Kentucky University, graduating in 1985 with a Master of Arts in Ethnology and Living Museums.

He served as director of the Cook Islands National Museum, before moving to New Zealand and lecturing in Cook Islands studies at Victoria University of Wellington. After returning to the Cook Islands he served as President of the Cook Islands Democratic Party, and as Secretary of the Ministry of Culture. In 2009, he was appointed High Commissioner to New Zealand. In 2013 he was appointed as a member of the advisory board to the Seabed Minerals Authority.

Tongia began writing poetry at Tereora College, and continued his work at university, where he was published in Unispac. His work was subsequently published in the Mana section of Pacific Islands Monthly, and in the South Pacific Creative Arts Society's journal, Mana. In 1977 he published his first collection of poetry, Korero, the first work published by a Cook Islander in the Cook Islands.

== Bibliography ==
- Korero (1977) Suva : Mana Publications
- Purua : a collection of poems (1980) Rarotonga, Purua and Teachers College
- Learning Rarotonga Maori : how to speak in ordinary situations (1991) Rarotonga, Ministry of Cultural Development
- Tipani : poems of the Cook Islands (1991) Rarotonga, Ministry of Cultural Development
