= Vereara Maeva-Taripo =

Cook Island political organizer (1940–2019)

BEM Vereara Maeva-Taripo
- Born: 26 September 1940; Aitutaki, Cook Islands
- Died: 26 September 2019 (aged 79); Rarotonga, Cook Islands
- Known for: Textile
- Notable work: Kaute (Hibiscus) (2019)
- Style: Tivaevae / Tivaivai

Vereara Maeva-Taripo (also Vereara Maeva, Vereara Teariki Monga Maeva, Vearea Ngarangi Teariki Maeva BEM; born Aitutaki, August 27, 1940; died 2019) was a Cook Islander political organiser also known for her quilting of tivaevae.

== Biography ==
Maeva-Taripo was born and raised on the island of Aiutaki. She originally trained as a school teacher and later worked in public service before becoming involved in non-governmental organisations. Her husband was a doctor, and the couple had three sons and one daughter. She held a rangitira title under Tinomana Ariki and supported the parliamentary recognition of ariki.

== Political work ==
Maeva-Taripo served as the president of the Cook Islands Association of Non-Government Organisations (CIANGO), often pressing local government to consider environmental issues. Much of her organisational work stemmed from her observation that alternative support networks were needed as kinship networks began to fray.

She participated in feminist organisations and projects, reporting on the challenges women face in the Cook Islands, and starting organisations such as Cook Islands National Council of Women (CINCW), which she founded in 1984. She summed up her attitude as, "I just want women to realise their potential as women." She has been interviewed and featured in academic works on feminism in the Pacific.

In June 2006, Maeva-Taripo received a British Empire Medal for her dedication to public service in the Cook Islands.

== Art ==
=== Textile work ===
Maeva-Taripo learned the craft from her aunt and grandmother and made her first tivaevae at age sixteen. Her tivaevae have been shown in galleries and museums in the Cook Islands, and the United States, and are held in the collections of several Cook Island institutions. Her work is often depicted in academic writings about the medium.^{:71} In 2001, Maeva-Taripo sold one of her tivaevae, which had won the highest honours at the National Council of Women's annual conference the previous year, to the Rarotongan Beach Resort and Spa for $10,000 (in New Zealand dollars), which was an unprecedented sum to be paid to a quilter.

A series of portrait photographs of Maeva-Taripo taken by John Daley and photographs of her tivaevae from the early 1990s are held in Te Papa, the national museum of New Zealand.

She positioned tivaevae as central to her identity as a woman from the Cook Islands, with the communal labor serving as a place for socializing, networking, and expression. Maeva-Taripo worried that the craft might be lost, stating in 2001:

I can't help feeling sad about the fact that our young girls today don't seem to care or understand the value of our tivaevae, nor have the interest to learn the skills. It will be a great loss to our culture if we don't wake up now and try and save this unique and priceless gift of wisdom from of grandmothers, our mothers and the Almighty. 'Take heed of the wisdom of the "old" for thine is the joy and pride of belonging and owning an identity of being a true Cook Islands Woman'.

Maeva-Taripo collaborated with Tungane Broadbent multiple times, including Grandmothers Legacy (2014) in BCA Gallery, Tivaevae (2015) in Queensland Art Gallery.

Her tivaevae are in the collection of Oceanside Museum of Art in United States, Christchurch Art Gallery, in New Zealand, and a dress, or mu'umu'u, she made, is in the collection of the British Museum.

=== Music ===
Maeva-Taripo composed her first song at age nineteen. The majority of her songs are about legends or Cook Island culture. She was also a singer and competed in national contests. She wrote and recorded songs, some of which are preserved in the New Zealand National Library. Some of her songs were recorded by other artists as well.

In 2010, Maeva-Taripo served as the leader of the Cook Islands Music Association, which was part of UNESCO meetings on intangible cultural heritage.

==== Discography ====
- Vereara Maeva and The D.O.G. Band, Korero; Araura taku ipukarea (Arorangi, Rarotonga: Teura Music Productions, 1997)
