= Performing arts in New Zealand =

Performing arts in New Zealand include amateur and professional presentations of theatre, circus, dance and music where it accompanies live performance. New Zealand has an active contemporary performing arts culture; many people participate in performing arts activities and most people live near an arts centre or theatre building.

== History ==
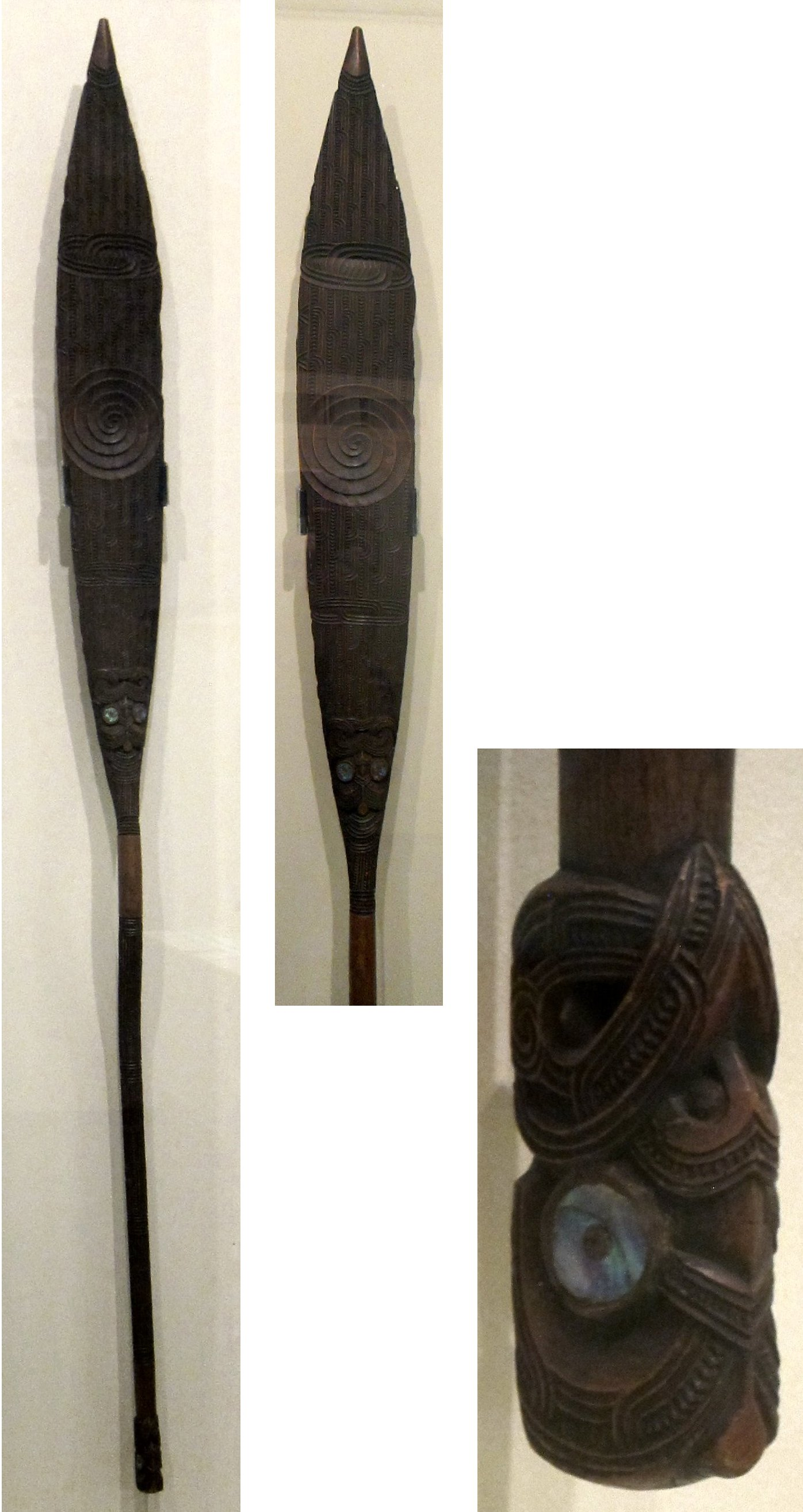
Ceremonial Māori canoe paddle (c.1880–1890). Art-objects used in Māori performing arts.

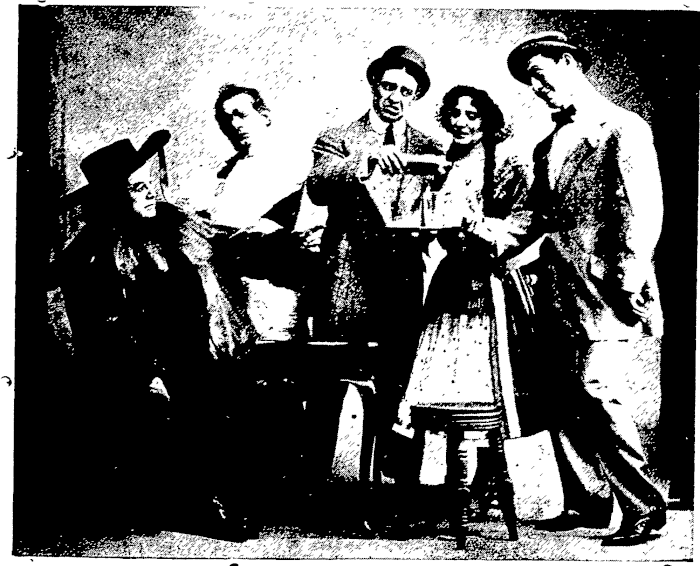
The Red Mill a J. C. Williamson New Zealand production in 1909

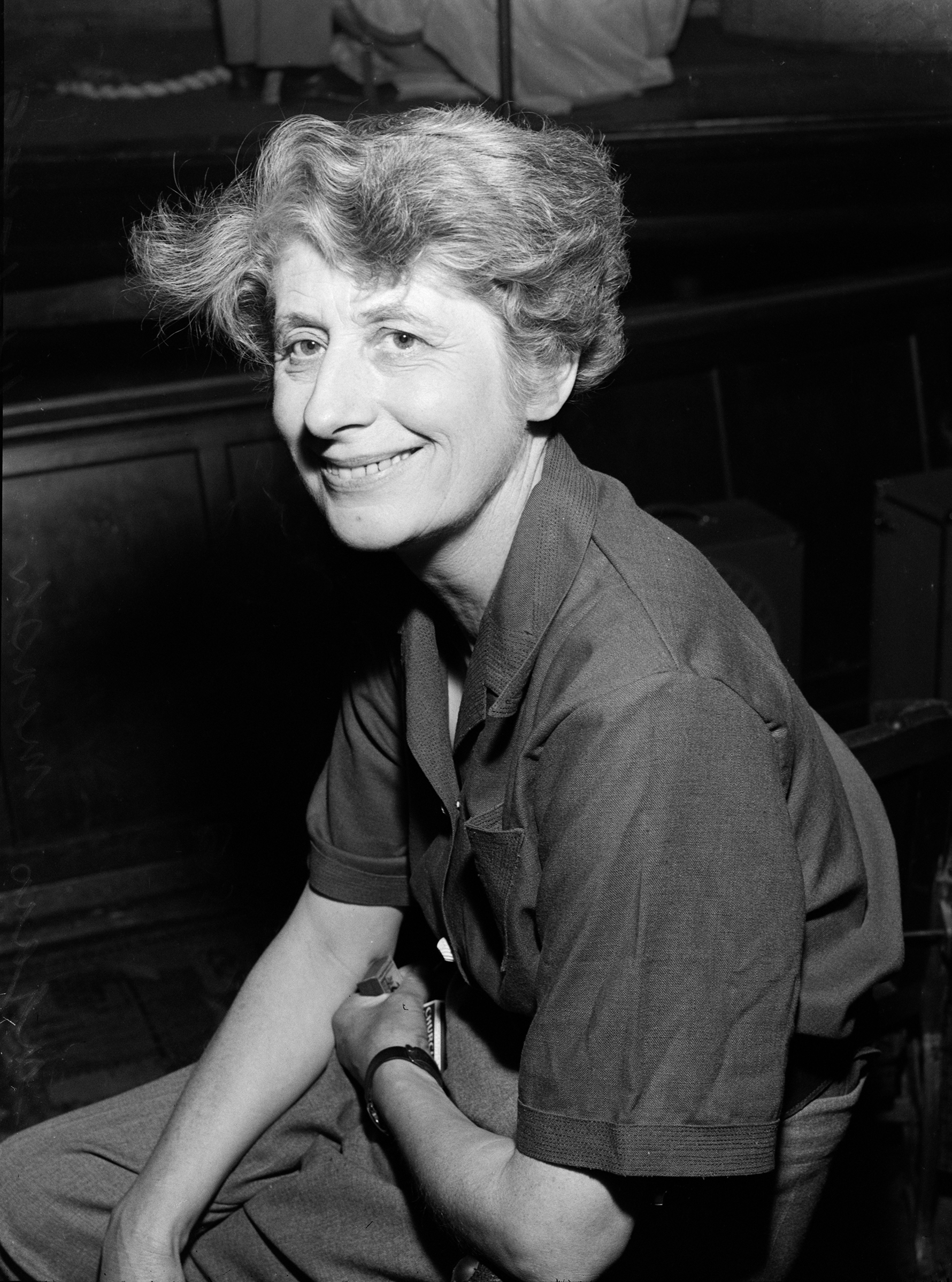
Ngaio Marsh, author and theatre director (1949)

=== Māori performing arts, toi and whare tapere ===
The Indigenous peoples of New Zealand are Māori. The Māori worldview is different to that of the settler colonists and Western perspective, and performing arts was interlinked with aspects of daily life. The closest word for arts in the Māori language is toi.

...'toi' often translates as knowledge, skill, excellence, source, origin, or mastery. (Ranea Aperahama, 2018)

Pre-European Māori culture was oral, passing on knowledge through story, song and genealogy. Knowledge was transferred and preserved in art, including carvings (whakairo), weaving (raranga), song (waiata) and dance (haka). Artefacts were handed down through generations. Artist and scholar Rangihiroa Panaho relates to viewing and understanding Māori art as a meandering river, through the viewpoints of both a 'traditional' and 'contemporary' lens.

Māori art is an idea, not so much a form: it is the flow, not so much where the flow settles. (Rangihiroa Panaho, 2015)

It is known from mātauranga Māori (Māori knowledge) that there were Whare Tapere, pre-European places of storytelling and entertainment which included waiata (songs), haka (dance), ngā kōrero (stories), taonga pūoro (musical instruments), Ngā Taonga-o-Wharawhara (body adornments), karetao (puppets) and tākaro (games and amusements). Academic Te Ahukaramū Charles Royal says of Whare Tapere: "They fell into disuse in the 19th century and new ways of performing were subsequently developed by Maori communities." Tinerau and Kae are the Māori ancestors of performing arts.

The well-known form of kapa haka is part of the new ways of performing in Aotearoa.

Haka is translated into English as dance but as scholar Tīmoti Kāretu says it is more than a pastime; it is a composition, an expression of disciplined emotion and can hold a variety of roles including as welcome, as entertainment, as challenge, and as defiance and contempt.

The ability to haka and to do so with style, grace, elegance and panache, was extremely important in traditional Māori society. (Tīmoti Kāretu,1993)

=== Settler colonist performing arts ===
==== Late 18th century and 19th century ====
Sailors, sealers and whalers were the first Europeans to arrive to New Zealand at the end of the 18th century. They sang shanties, mostly of British and American origin, although some were adapted to a New Zealand context such as The Sailor's Way. Settler colonists started arriving in New Zealand at the beginning of the 19th century with trading stations established in the north. The first Christian mission station was established in the Bay of Islands in 1814 by Samuel Marsden. The first ship of settlers from the New Zealand Company arrived in Wellington in January 1840. The British upper class brought their culture of poetry recitals, literary reading and music with them. Amongst possessions shipped to New Zealand were instruments such as pianos as fictionalised in the film The Piano directed by Jane Campion. Working-class people from England, Ireland and Scotland were the biggest earliest migrant groups and they brought their performing arts traditions of singing, folk dancing and storytelling. Chinese immigrants came to New Zealand during the 1860s gold rush, with over 2,000 Chinese men settled in Otago by 1869. Other groups came to New Zealand too such as Dalmatians in the 1880s. There is very little written about performing arts of non-British migrant groups such as those from China and Europe over this period.

Once there were British settlements in New Zealand, touring theatre and music productions with English actors and managers toured through New Zealand and Australia. J.C. Williamson was one of these companies and Mrs W. H. Foley was a well-known performer of revues that included dramatic sketches and music. Pollard's Lilliputian Opera Company toured in Australia and New Zealand for thirty years from 1880. Entrepreneurial theatre managers built theatre buildings in every town as the settler populations increased. In Wellington the first theatre opened in 1843, only three years after the first settler ship arrived. This first theatre was called the Royal Victoria Theatre, it was a small wooden building with stalls and a gallery, lit by whale oil. In Auckland the Fitzroy on Shortland Street opened in 1844.

==== Early 20th century ====
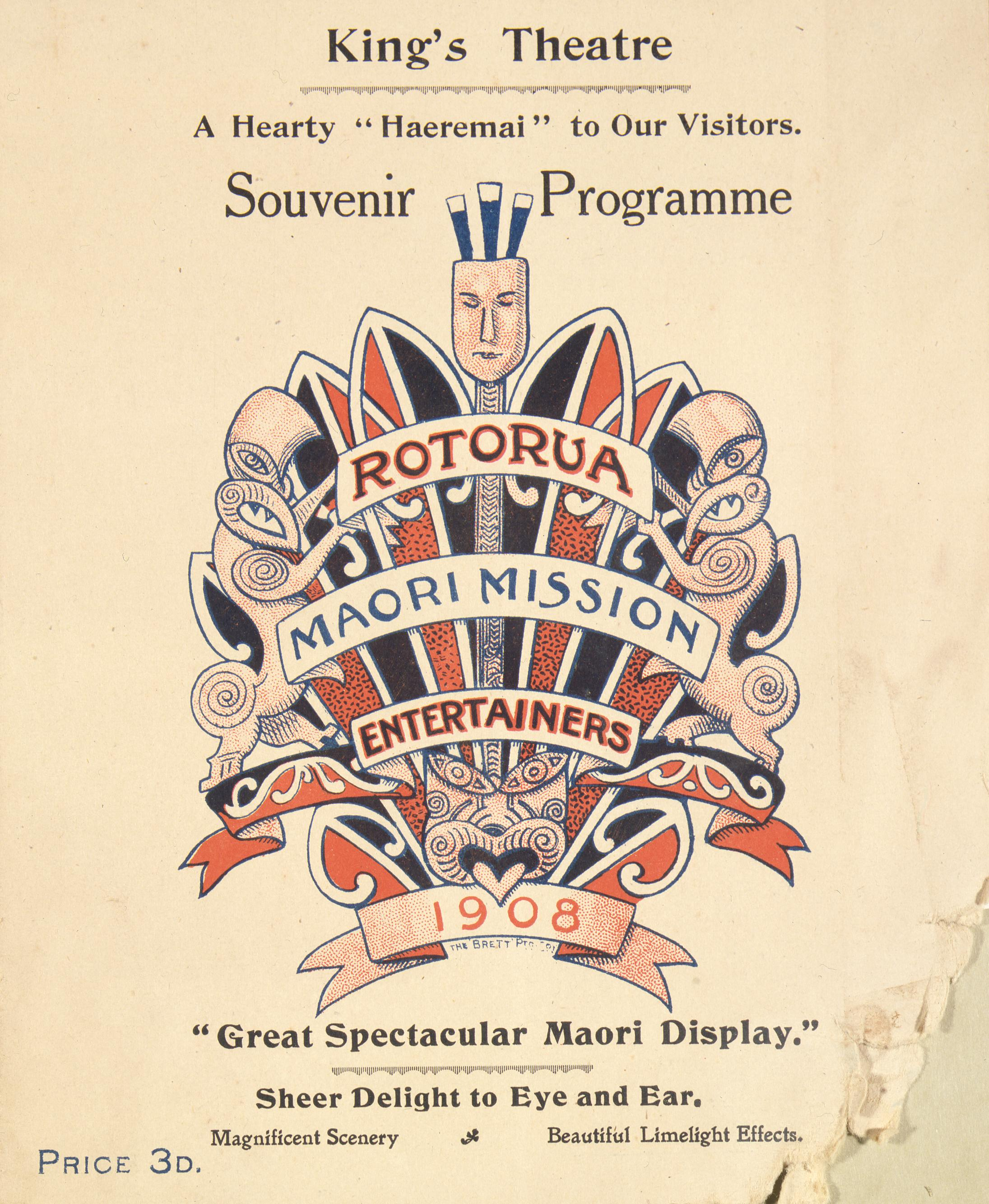
King's Theatre -Rotorua Maori Mission Entertainers 1908. Great spectacular Maori display. Souvenir programme. (Cover). 1908. (21065397114)

In the 1920s, performing arts in cities changed with radio and cinema being introduced. Drama and entertainment consisted of touring British or Australian companies, for example English Shakespearean actor Allan Wilkie, who toured New Zealand seven times between 1916 and 1930. There were some New Zealand poets, novelists and short story authors but creating original New Zealand-based plays was not common. Rosemary Rees tried to established a theatre company in the 1920s and Ngaio Marsh was a member. Marsh also was part of Wilkie's touring company in 1919 and 1920.

Charles Cabot was a well known entertainer born in Wellington who travelled in 1912 on horse and cart with circus groups and also worked in Australia.

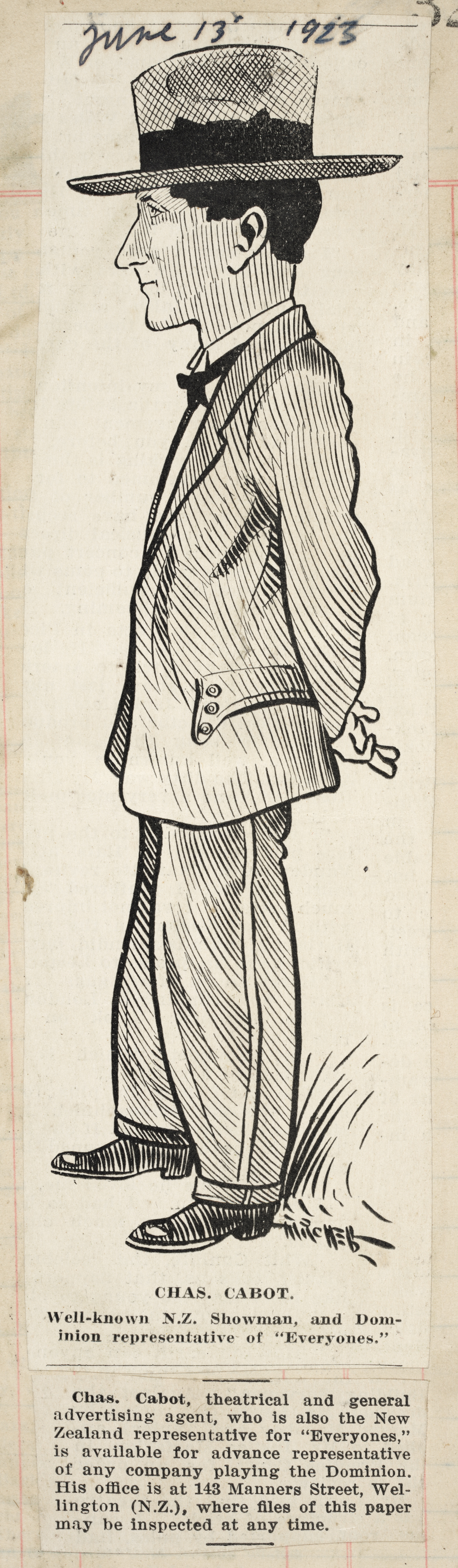
Chas Cabot, well-known New Zealand entertainer (1923)

The 1910s and 1920s saw growth of amateur theatre in New Zealand, where people "put on plays for their own recreation and to present to other people". The New Zealand branch of the British Drama League was established in 1932. There were many writers contributing and three quarters were women. Violet Targuse was one who won several Drama League competitions with her work. New Zealand audiences wanted to see plays and the competition from cinema had mostly stopped the touring companies coming so amateur societies filled the gap. Most of the plays produced apart from the one act plays competition were English stories. Gilbert and Sullivan musicals and plays were popular in the 1930s. Writer Peter Harcourt in his book A Dramatic Appearance: New Zealand theatre 1920-1970 states that the 1930s although many people were involved in amateur theatre there was a "blinkered concentration on the west End of London" which meant writers and societies through the 1930s and 1940s presented plays about England. Harcourt describes this as "teacups and tennis-courts". Unity Theatre, a theatre company in Wellington founded in 1942 that ran until around 1979, specialised in bringing social, moral and political issues to audiences. Unity Theatre were an exception with most societies presenting only about one New Zealand play a year between 1950 and 1976. Other exceptions were the Community Arts Service in Auckland and the Māori Musical Society, which presented in 1941 an adaption of Hinemoa by Arthur Adam with soprano Te Mauri Meihana in the lead role.

Dance halls were how many people spent their entertainment time in the 1940s including a media outcry that this was introducing a slipping of morals, compounded by the numerous American soldiers stationed around New Zealand.

== Establishment of professional New Zealand performing arts ==
Development of professional New Zealand performing arts was also the development of a unique voice of New Zealand arts, one that reflected the communities that lived in New Zealand. Early professional theatre companies were New Zealand Players, active between 1952 and 1960 that toured nationally and the Southern Comedy Players (also called Southern Players) based in Dunedin and touring nationally, 1957–1971.

Richard Campion was the founder of the New Zealand Players, influenced by Bruce Mason and Ngaio Marsh. Mason's play The Pohutukawa Tree was written in 1955 and first performed in 1957 by the New Zealand Players. It is well known in New Zealand and often studied in schools. As director Colin McColl says, it is an expression of the 'complexities and the misunderstandings of Māori-Pākehā relations at the time'.

In 1963 a New Zealand government funding body for the arts was established, the Queen Elizabeth ll Arts Council. Bill Sheat was appointed to the drama panel and he was the chair from 1969 to 1973.

New Zealand actors and dancers were only trained by private teachers or learnt from appearing in amateur productions. The British-based Royal Academy of Dance's teaching certificate was first offered in the 1930s. If further training or education was desired for a professional career, people travelled overseas, usually to Britain. This changed with the opening of the National School of Ballet in 1967 (renamed the New Zealand School of Dance in 1982) and the New Zealand Drama School in 1970 (renamed Toi Whakaari in 1989). Rawiri Paratene was the first Māori graduate of Toi Whakaari: New Zealand Drama School in 1972.

Downstage Theatre was a professional theatre company in Wellington (1964 to 2013) which occupied the purpose-built Hannah Playhouse.

The Māori Theatre Trust was formed in 1966 after an experience by Māori actors in Porgy and Bess that had Īnia Te Wīata in the lead and George Henare and 30 other Māori performers in the chorus. The Māori Theatre Trust supported training for Māori actors and the development and growth of contemporary Māori performance. Members included Don Selwyn and Rowley Habib (Rore Hapipi). They ceased to be active after 1970.

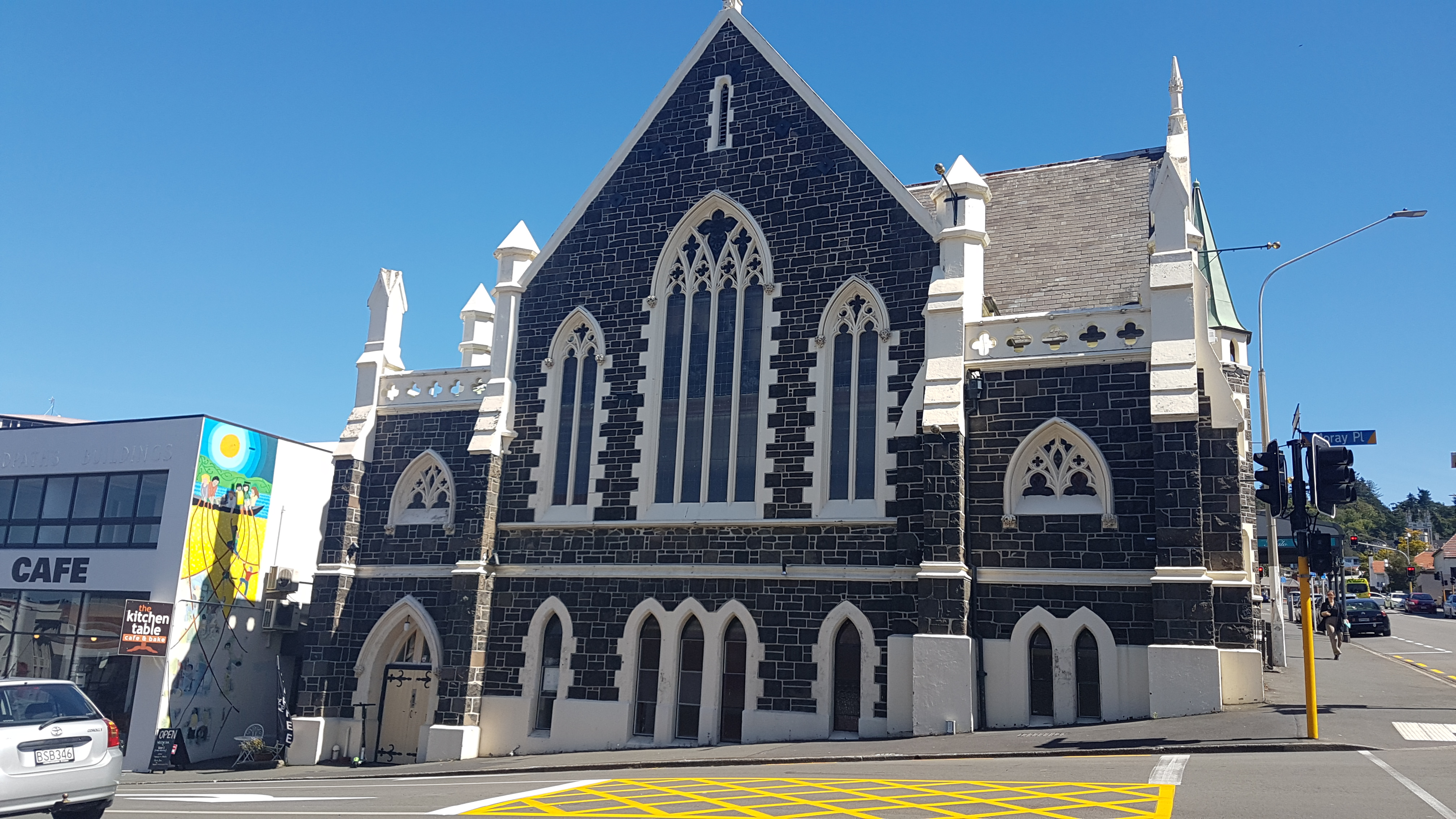
Fortune Theatre, Dunedin

The inaugural New Zealand Polynesian Cultural Festival began in 1972 and with the introduction of Māori Language Day in the same year, (initiated by Ngā Tama Toa and others including actor Rawiri Paratene), Māori cultural performing arts had more platforms to be performed in settings other than marae. The New Zealand Polynesian Cultural Festival became the Aotearoa Traditional Māori Performing Arts Festival in 1983 and then Te Matatini in 2004, and is a national biennial kapa haka competition and celebration.

Contemporary Māori performance company Te Ika a Maui Players started in 1976 with a three-year New Zealand tour of the play The death of the land by Rowley Habib. Circa Theatre in Wellington was established in 1976.

Te Ohu Whakaari, was a Māori theatre cooperative formed in the early 1980s that created and performed plays across New Zealand, touring for 15 years to schools and marae. It was formed by Rangimoana Taylor, and playwrights included his siblings Apirana Taylor and Riwia Brown. Writer and director Briar Grace-Smith was part of this group.

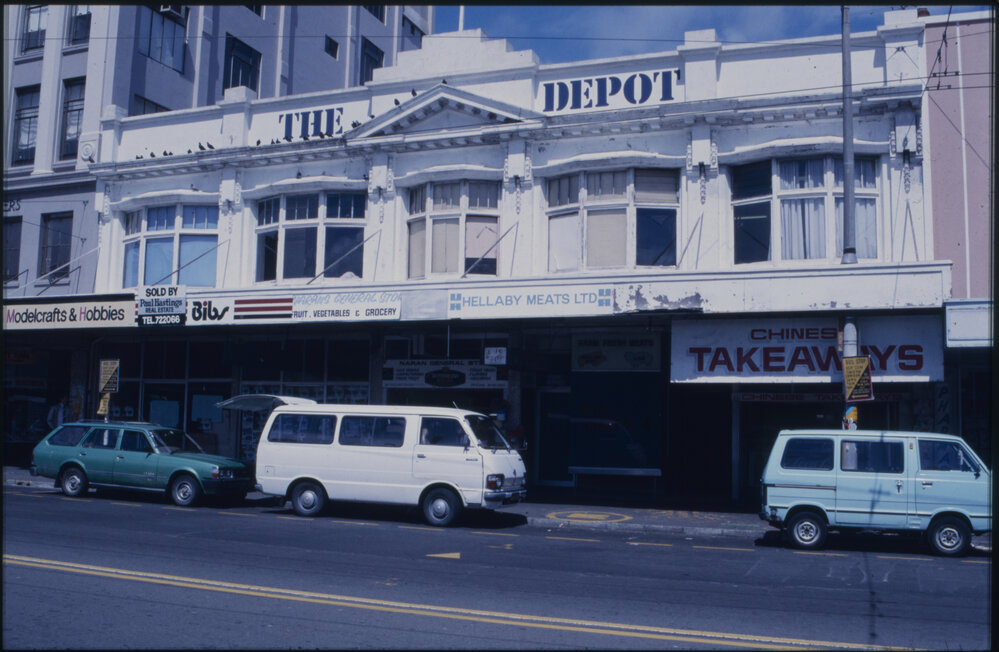
The Depot that became Taki Rua, original location on Courtenay Place, Wellington

Blerta was a musical and theatrical collective from 1971 until 1975 that travelled around New Zealand. Red Mole was an alternative theatre company established in 1974, who also toured around New Zealand at various times.

The Globe Theatre in Dunedin, built by Patrick and Rosalie Carey in 1961 supported New Zealand poet and author James K. Baxter to write plays in the 1970s, they also presented Greek classics such as Euripides, the first production of Waiting for Godot by Samuel Beckett in New Zealand, and other New Zealand work such as A State of Siege adapted from Janet Frame. The Fortune Theatre was professional theatre company in Dunedin from 1973 to 2018.

In 1981, Downstage Theatre in Wellington opened a small space to showcase New Zealand work, The Depot Theatre with The Rose, a short play by Roger Hall, a one-act 'political parable' that had premiered at Theatre Corporate in Auckland. It was directed by Phillip Mann and featured commedia dell'arte masks by designer Raymond Boyce, and a character 'The Leader' based on the Prime Minister of the time Robert Muldoon. Actors in this production included Kate Harcourt and Desmond Kelly. It was a statement for the new venue to open with a political commentary in the lead-up to a general election, the following review summarises:

It is a politically chilling statement on life in New Zealand today, a simple warming to us about sitting back and allowing democracy to be trampled underfoot by a power-hungry megalomaniac. (Ralph McAllister, 1981)

The Depot theatre evolved into the current Māori theatre company Taki Rua.

Other theatre companies include the Mercury Theatre in Auckland, the Court Theatre in Christchurch and Centrepoint Theatre in Palmerston North.

== Contemporary performing arts in New Zealand ==
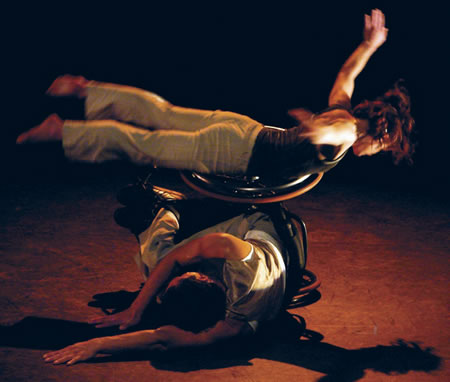
Rodney Bell performing with AXIS Dance Company

Performing arts is part of the arts and cultural sector in New Zealand. Manatū Taonga showed 'that the arts and creative sector contributed $14.9 billion to New Zealand's GDP for the year ending March 2022', this is 4.2% of the total economy and is the highest since 2000 when recording began. As of March 2022, 115,000 people were primarily employed in the creative sector (32% self-employed).

=== Arts access ===
It is increasingly part of performing arts presentations to ensure access for people who experience barriers to participation. The disability, mental health and Deaf communities and various community arts organisations support and promote access through a variety of means. Arts Access Aotearoa is a central advocacy body and has an annual awards called Te Putanga Toi Arts Access Awards running since 2008. Companies working in this area include Equal Voices Arts in the Waikato 'where deaf artists lead their equal voiced performing arts organisation' and Touch Compass, a dance company established in 1997. People involved over the years in Touch Compass include Catherine Chappell, Suzanne Cowan, Alisha McLennan Marler, Adus Smith, Sierra Diprose, Julie van Renen, Rodney Bell and Lusi Faiva.

=== Asian theatre ===
Contemporary performance works by Asian artists in New Zealand include plays by Lynda Chanwai-Earle, Renée Lang, Sarita So and Ahi Karunaharan. Lynda Chanwai-Earle's play Ka Shue (Letters Home) in 1996 is acknowledged as the first Chinese New Zealand play.

Indian Ink Theatre Company first presented Krishnan's Dairy by Jacob Rajan in 1997. It has won an Edinburgh Fringe First Award and two Production of the Year Awards at the Chapman Tripp Theatre Awards.

Other notable Asian theatre productions include The Mooncake and the Kumara by Mei-Lin Hansen, the opera The Bone Feeder by Renee Liang, and OTHER [chinese] by Alice Canton. Since these were all presented in the same year, 2017, author Austin Tseng suggested this was about a growth of agency within Chinese New Zealanders.

We were spoken about, but now we ourselves speak. (Austin Tseng, 2017)

In 2022 Scenes from a Yellow Peril by Nathan Joe was presented by Auckland Theatre Company, SquareSums&Co, and Oriental Maidens. Auckland Theatre Company director Jonathan Bielski described it as: 'Heartbreakingly personal, gloriously queer, furiously political and unexpectedly funny.'

Other companies include Prayas Theatre led by Sananda Chatterjeed's which is a South Asian theatre and cultural group that started in 2005, and Proudly Asian Theatre, a company formed in 2013 by Chye-Ling Huang and James Roque.

=== Circus and physical theatre ===
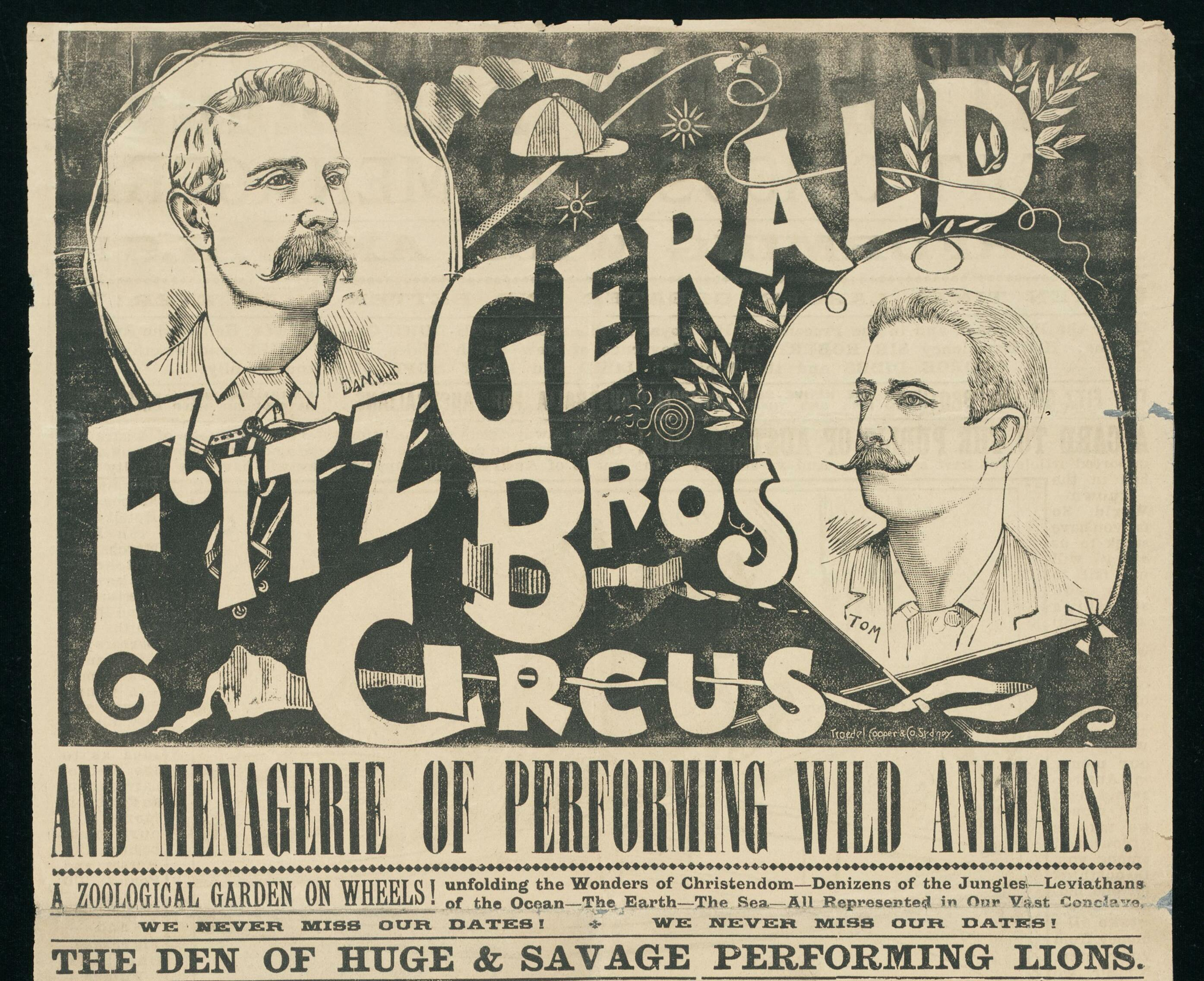
Fitzgerald Bro(ther)s Circus and menagerie of performing wild animals (Recto. 1894). (21064658294) (cropped)

In the late 19th century the FitzGerald Brothers Circus from Australia presented shows in big tops with animals. Wirth's Circus also from Australia also toured New Zealand including in the 1950s.

The Dust Palace is a circus theatre company based in Auckland since 2009. There is a range of circus training available in New Zealand and the Dust Palace offers adult classes. Zirka Circus has been touring New Zealand since 2011. Circus Aotearoa is a family-owned, New Zealand-based circus. Weber Bros circus has toured New Zealand and internationally since the early 1990s.

=== Comedy ===
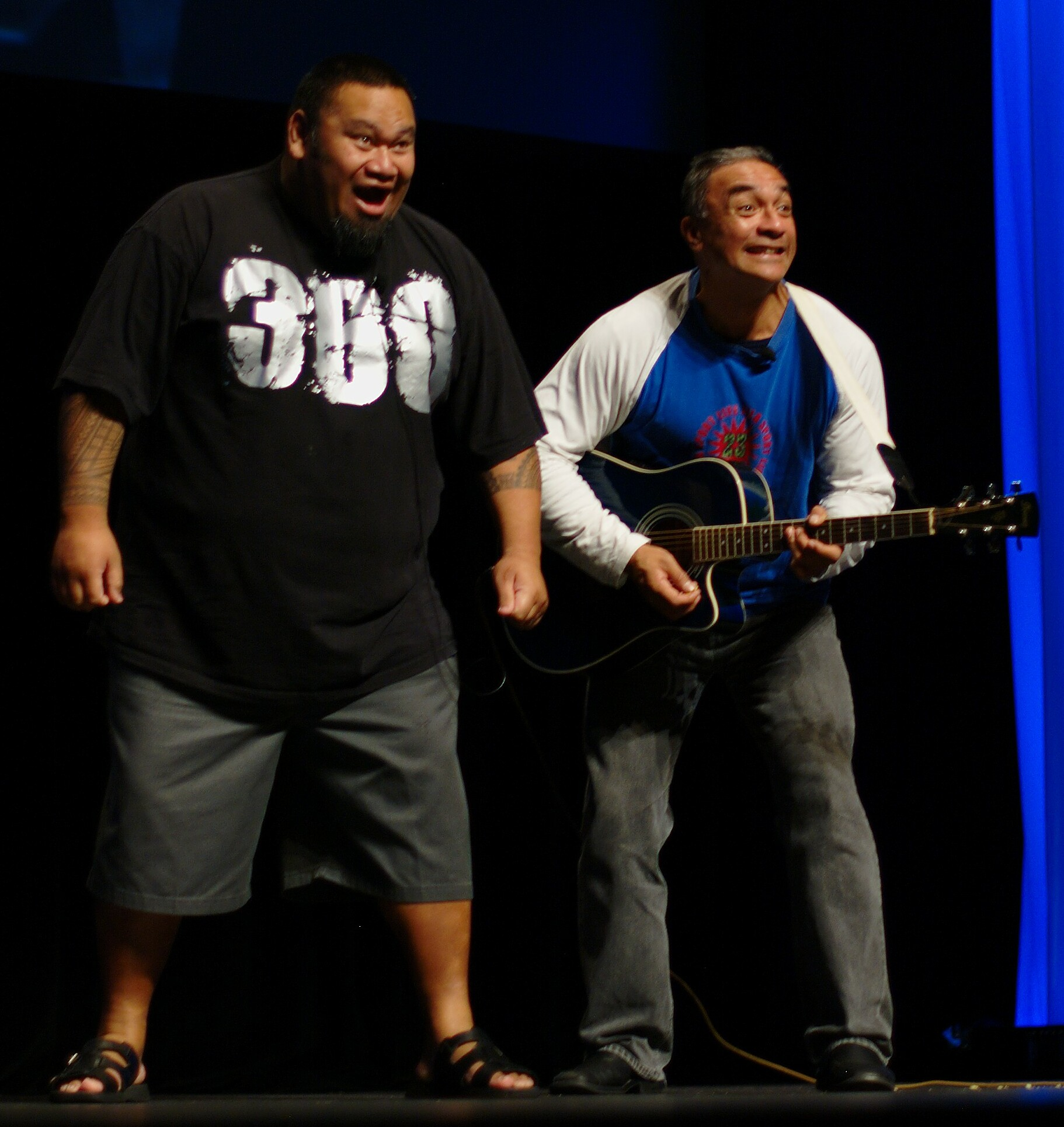
The Laughing Samoans

Well-known New Zealand comedians include Rose Matafeo, Billy T James, The Flight of the Conchords, Dai Henwood, John Clarke, and the Topp Twins. Hens' Teeth Women's Comedy Company is a woman-only comedy troupe based in Wellington, founded in 1988. Comedians Tofiga Fepulea'i and Eteuati Ete formed the Laughing Samoans in 2003 and toured a new show annually for many years starting in 2003.

There is an annual New Zealand International Comedy Festival that has been running for 25 years. It is produced by the New Zealand Comedy Trust which is a not-for-profit development organisation with three staff. In 2023, the general manager is Lauren Whitney. The Trust also awards the Billy T Award to an up-and-coming comedy talent.

Theatresports were established in New Zealand in the 1980s. The Court Jesters were a professional group in Christchurch, and their show Scared Scriptless has been going since the early 1990s. Alumni of this include Hamish Parkinson, Brynley Stent and Eli Matthewson.

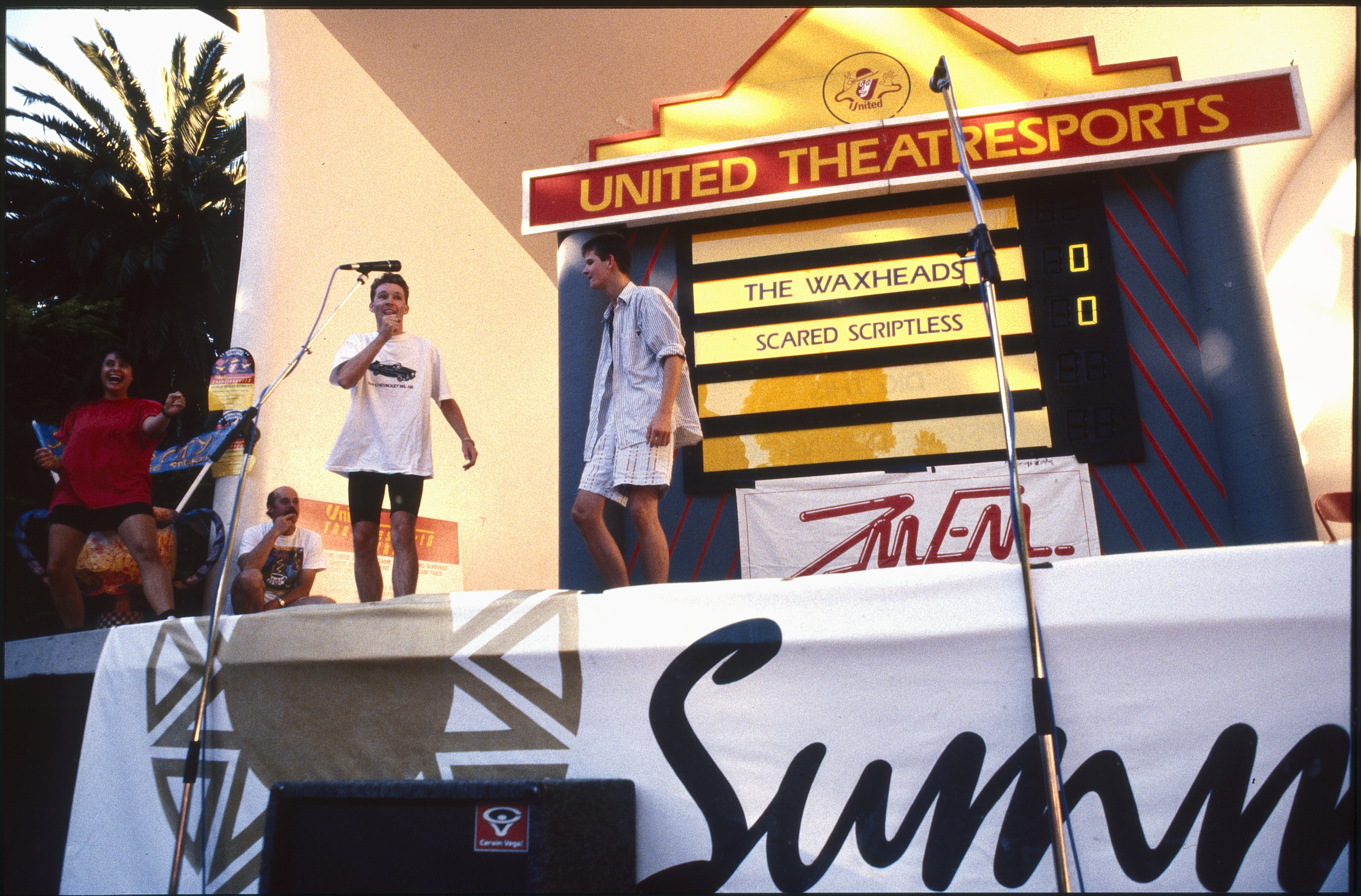
Summer City - Sound Shell Concert - Theatresports 1984

=== Dance ===
Dance in New Zealand includes cultural dance, ballet, hiphop, contemporary dance, and kapa haka and is participated in by many people around New Zealand. Dance Aotearoa New Zealand is the national organisation representing dancers of all types.

The dance sector spans performance, education and the community. Professionals may work across all three of these sectors over the course of their career or simultaneously. (DANZ)

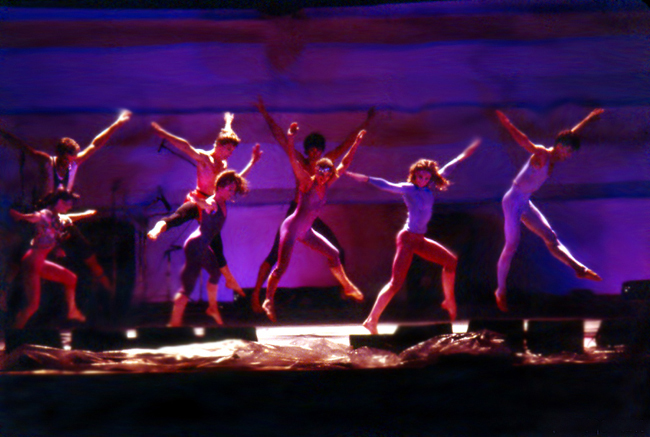
Limbs Dance Company

==== Professional dance companies ====
- Atamira dance company, Māori contemporary dance company based in Auckland, founded 2000
- Black Grace, internationally touring modern dance company, formed in Auckland, in 1995
- Footnote Dance, founded in 1985 in Wellington, is New Zealand's oldest contemporary dance company
- Limbs Dance Company, formed in Auckland in 1977 and disbanded in Wellington in 1989
- Touch Compass, established in 1997 with disabled and non-disabled dancers
- The New Zealand Dance Company, Auckland based, nationally focused contemporary dance company, founded in 2012
- The Royal New Zealand Ballet, based in Wellington, founded in 1953

=== Indigenous performing arts in New Zealand ===
The Kia Mau Festival is a regular festival that programmes contemporary performing arts from Māori, Pasifika and Indigenous artists.

==== Māori ====
Traditional Māori performing arts is often framed as kapa haka, haka is 'dance' in Māori language. The biennial event for kapa haka is the competition Te Matatini Herenga Waka Herenga Tangata that in 2023 received more than 1.8 million viewers to the televised event. Traditional instruments include taonga pūoro and the there has been research on ancient Māori puppets, karetao held by museums.

Haka Theatre has been used as a term for a hybrid form since the later 1980s with the performance Autaia presented by Auckland Live and Hawaiki TŪ in 2023, featuring performances from 400 school-age young people.

There are many notable contemporary Māori theatre and dance people and companies. Atamira dance company is one example founded in 2000. Te Ika a Maui Players, Maranga Mai, Taki Rua, Tawata and Te Rākau Hua o Te Wao Tapu are Māori theatre companies.

==== Pasifika ====
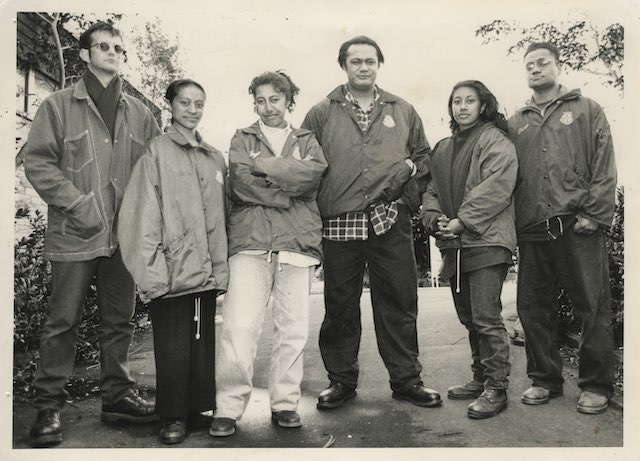
Pacific Underground (1994)

There are many Indigenous Peoples from different Pacific Islands who are resident in New Zealand, and an annual celebration of cultural arts is the Pasifika Festival.

Pasifika artists known for their comedy work include the Naked Samoans whose first stage production in 1998 was Naked Samoans Talk about Their Knives, and Tofiga Fepulea'i and Eteuati Ete who made up the duo the Laughing Samoans (first performed in 2003).

An early company was Pacific Underground, who started in Christchurch in 1992 and is New Zealand 'longest running Pasifika performing arts group'. Plays they have developed and presented include Fresh Off The Boat by Oscar Kightley and Simon Small first staged in 1993, and more recently in 2019 at the Court Theatre. They won the Lifetime Achievement Award at the Pacific Music Awards in 2016.

Black Grace and Lemi Ponifasio's company MAU are two well-known Pasifika contemporary dance companies. Le Moana founded by Tupe Lualua is a dance theatre company that also produces the annual Measina Festival.

A Pacific theatre company that has been presenting and touring work since 2003 is The Conch founded by Nina Nawalowalo and Tom McCrory.

=== Magic ===
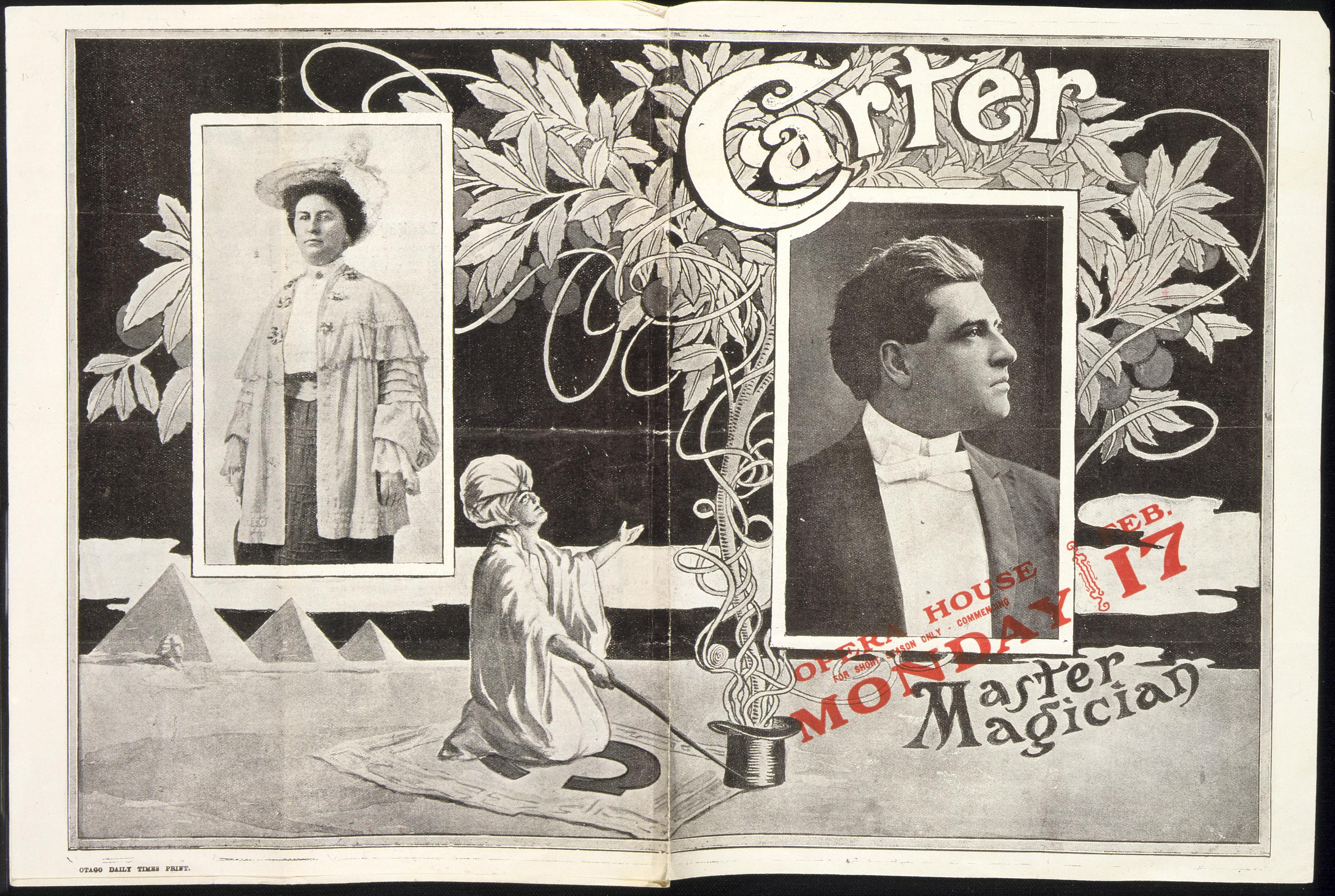
Carter the magician and Abigail Price the Psychic - poster for a show at the Opera House, Otago (1908)

One of the earliest magicians in New Zealand would have been Jane Whiteside, a tightrope dancer, gymnast and magician, who performed under a number of aliases in the 1870s. Whiteside took up magic after seeing American magician Cora de Lamond, billed as 'the only female magician in the world' perform in 1873. Touring magic shows occurred.

Edgar Wilson Benyon was a magician, juggler and entertainer who started in Christchurch and went on to have a successful career in Australia and the UK. The New Zealand Benny Award is named after him.

The Auckland Brotherhood of Magicians, a chapter of the International Brotherhood of Magicians (Ring 160) was formed in 1945. They held a conference in 2021 for the first time in 24 years. The chapter awards the Grand Master of Magic Award, on behalf of all magicians in New Zealand, for a lifetime of excellence in the magical arts.

Notable magicians in New Zealand, past and present: Jane Whiteside, Richard Webster, the Wizard of New Zealand, Mick Peck, Edgar Wilson Benyon, Timothy Hyde, Paul Romhany, Ross Skiffington, Alan Watson.

=== Media ===
In 2023 a national 'deficit in arts and culture media coverage' was identified in a research underdone by Dr James Wenley and Isobel Tan. The independent research was commissioned by Creative New Zealand and published in a report. Regions fare worse than cities, and organisations that can afford to pay publicists are at an advantage creating an unequal playing field.

The reduction of arts and culture coverage in legacy media and the disestablishment of arts journalist positions are international trends, reflective of upheavals in for-profit media models over multiple decades, particularly in countries that have issues of scale, such as Aotearoa. (Rosabel Tan and James Wenley, 2023)

=== Musical theatre ===
Notable New Zealand musicals include the Rocky Horror Picture Show, and That Bloody Woman.

The Kila Kokonut Krew produced the Pasifika musical The Factory with an original score by Poulima Salima that had a sold out premiere season in Mangere Arts Centre, Auckland and toured to Australia in 2014. The Wellington-based theatre company Red Scare Theatre Company have produced new musicals including M'Lady: A Meninist Musical (2017), book and lyrics by Cassandra Tse and Jamie Cain, music and additional lyrics Michael John Stebbings, and The Bone Thief (2018), lyrics by Cassandra Tse, music by Bruno Shirley. The Barden Party specialises in musical Shakespeare.

==== Musical Theatre New Zealand ====
Musical Theatre New Zealand is the umbrella organisation for approximately 100 musical theatre societies in New Zealand. There are about 60 of these amateur theatre groups in the North Island and about 40 in the South Island. They are an incorporated society since 1961 with a president, vice president, five zone representatives, a part time general manager and a young person representative. They are a registered charity.

- Taieri Musical, founded in 1968 as the Outram Musical Society, then moved to Mosgiel, and adopted the Coronation Hall as its home.
- Musical Theatre Dunedin (formerly Dunedin Operatic)
- Musikmakers, amateur musical theatre organisation based in Hamilton, since 1976
- Nambassa Winter Show with Mahana, 1970s touring production of musicals
- Napier Operatic Society, amateur theatre society based in Napier, established in 1887

=== Opera ===
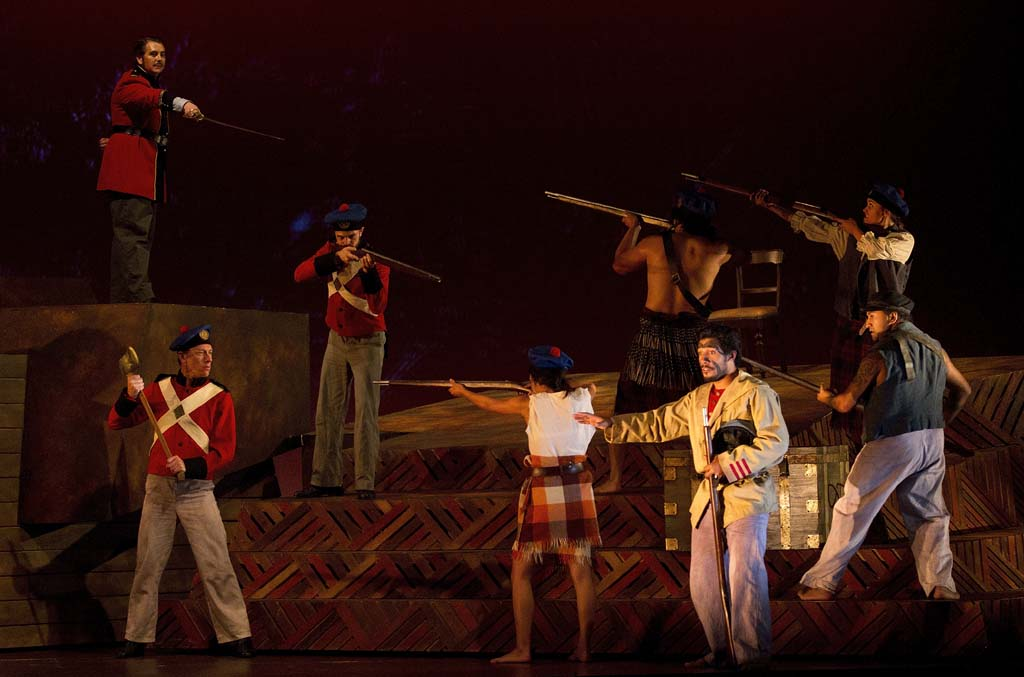
Hōhepa New Zealand Opera

==== Opera companies ====
- Canterbury Opera, based in Christchurch, last performance in 2006
- The New Zealand Opera Company defunct 1971
- New Zealand Opera, formed in 2000, New Zealand's only full-time professional opera company
- Opera Factory, based in Auckland,
- Opera New Zealand based in Auckland, merged into New Zealand Opera
- Opera Otago is based in Dunedin. It was established in 1956 and celebrates its 70th anniversary in 2026.
- Southern Opera, based in Canterbury, merged into New Zealand Opera in 2012
- Wellington City Opera was a professional opera company based in Wellington. It originated in 1982 as the De La Tour Regional Opera Trust, rebranded as The National Opera of Wellington, and then merged with Auckland-based Opera New Zealand to form New Zealand Opera.

=== Theatre ===
Theatre in New Zealand is theatre presented in New Zealand created by New Zealand companies and organisation. There is no national theatre company unlike some other countries. There are a number of organisations invested in by the New Zealand government through the agency Creative New Zealand Toi Aotearoa, including producing companies such as Court Theatre in Christchurch, Auckland Theatre Company in Auckland and Taki Rua in Wellington, and also arts festivals such as Te Tairāwhiti Arts Festival in Gisborne and the New Zealand Festival in Wellington.

==== Auckland ====
Theatre companies in Auckland include the Auckland Theatre Company, Indian Ink Theatre Company, theatre company founded in 1996, Kila Kokonut Krew, theatre company and music producer in Auckland since 2002, Massive Theatre Company, professional theatre company in Auckland that formed from the Maidment Youth Theatre at the University of Auckland in 1990. Pacific Underground, performing arts collective, founded in 1993 in Christchurch based in Auckland, produces contemporary performing art that reflects a Pacific Island heritage.

The company Silo Theatre led by Sophie Roberts decided at the end of 2022 to only do development and not presentation in 2023 due to the impacts of COVID-19. Red Leap Theatre describe their work as women led visual theatre, the artistic director is Ella Becroft, it was founded in 2008 by Kate Parker and Julie Nolan to present The Arrival adapted from Shaun Tan's graphic novel.

Te Pou Theatre co-founded by Amber Cureen and Tainui Tukiwaho was established in 2015, and in 2023 reopened a refurbished theatre at the Corban Estate Arts Centre in Henderson, West Auckland.

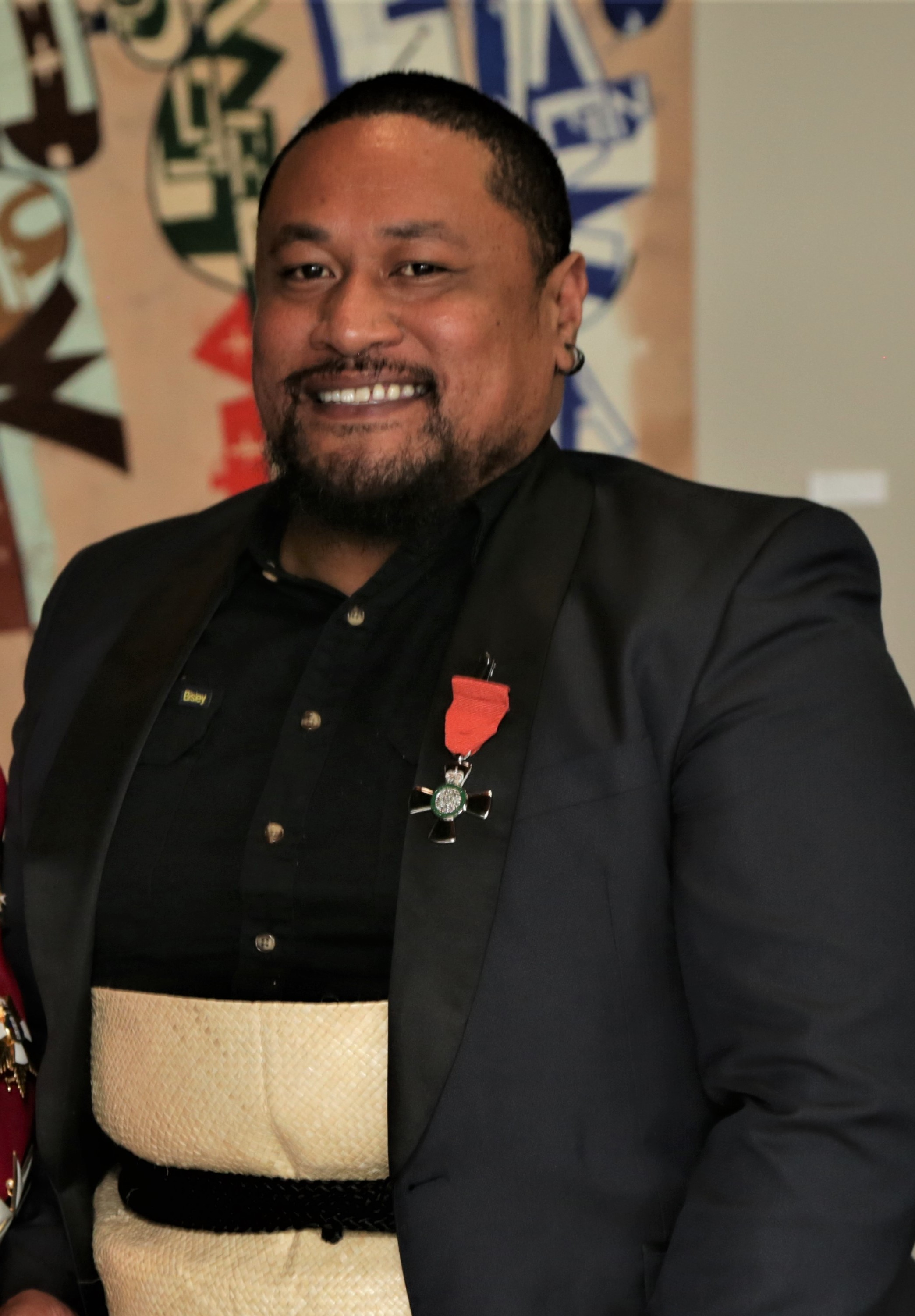
Tanu Gogo 2019 at his investiture

FAFSWAG is a Queer Pacific Arts Collective awarded an Arts Foundation Laureate in 2020. In 2017 they were resident at the Basement Theatre creating three shows speaking to their 'contexts as Queer Indigenous arts practitioners'. The collective includes Jermaine Dean, Falencie Filipo, Tanu Gago, Tapuaki Helu, Elyssia Wilson Heti, Nahora Ioane, Hōhua Ropate Kurene, Moe Laga-Toleafoa, Ilalio Loau, Tim Swann, Pati Tyrell and James Waititi.

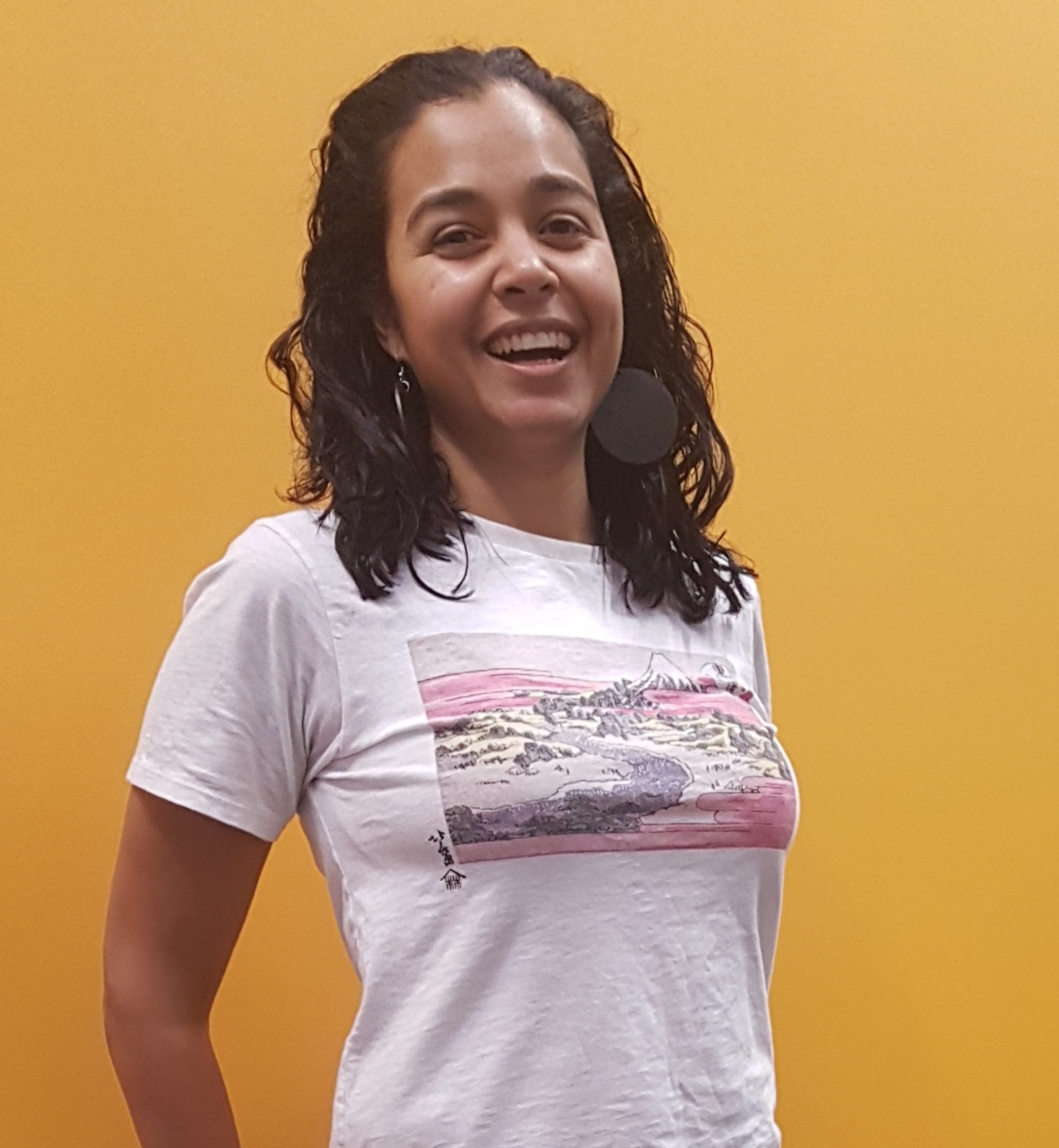
Dione Joseph (2021) Black Creatives Aotearoa

Black Creatives Aotearoa (BCA) is an arts organisation supporting and promoting creatives of African and Afro-Caribbean heritage in Aotearoa New Zealand based in Auckland. Their activities have included presentation of plays with Po’ Boys and Oysters by Estelle Chout at the Basement Theatre and a regular Playwrights' Lab. In 2022 a Playwrights’ Lab Showcase with scripts from Alex de Vries, Alvie McKree, Ayo Becksley-Adesanya, Dione Joseph, Estelle Chout, Kauthar Eckstein, Keagan Carr Fransch and Tawanda Manyimo. In 2023 they ran some events as part of Africa Month in Auckland including the Black to the Future zine, the Rituals art exhibition, and at the Auckland Central Library, the Black Ink bookstand.

The BCA Playwrights Showcase was an exceptional example of the diversity of Black Kiwi plays waiting for an audience in the New Zealand theatre scene. (Vira Paky, 2022)

==== Wellington ====
- BATS Theatre, theatre venue and producer in Wellington, initially founded as the Bats Theatre Company in 1976
- Bard Productions, theatre company in Wellington, established 2007
- Capital E's National Theatre for Children, based in Wellington but touring nationally with productions aimed at primary-aged children.
- Circa Theatre, professional theatre company in Wellington, established 1976
- The Conch, co-founded by Nina Nawalowalo and Tom McCrory
- Red Scare Theatre Company
- Taki Rua, also known as The New Depot and Depot Theatre; theatre organisation based in Wellington, since 1983, contemporary Māori productions
- Tawata Productions
- Tikapa Productions who produce Cohen Holloway, Jamie McCaskill, Rob Mokaraka, Jerome Leota and Erroll Anderson in The Māori Sidesteps.
- Young and Hungry Arts Trust

==== Christchurch ====
- Court Theatre, professional theatre company based in Christchurch, founded in 1971
- Free Theatre Christchurch, New Zealand's longest running producer of avant-garde experimental theatre, established 1979
- Two Productions
- University of Canterbury Drama Society, student performing-arts club at the University of Canterbury, Christchurch, beginning in 1921; was one of New Zealand's leading theatre groups from the 1920s to the 1960s

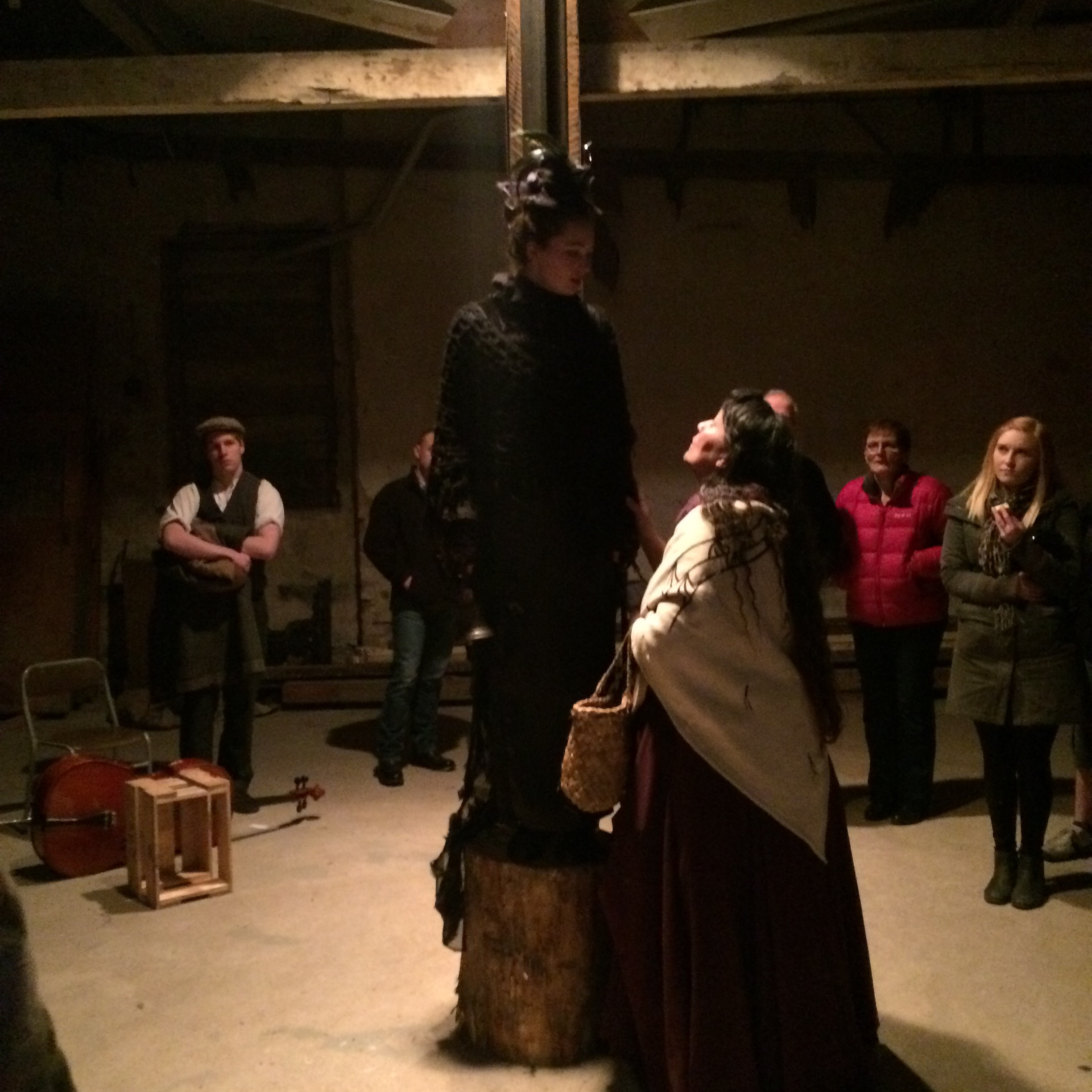
Farley's Arcade (2015), Wow! Productions, Athenaeum Building, Dunedin

==== Dunedin ====
- Globe Theatre, Dunedin, theatre and theatre company in Dunedin, opened 1961
- Playhouse Theatre, Dunedin
- Suitcase Theatre, theatre company in Dunedin, formed in 2014
- Arcade
- Ake Ake Productions
- Suitcase Theatre
- Prospect Park Productions NZ
- Wow! Productions

=== Music and sound ===
Live performance often includes music and musicians accompanying the performance. A New Zealand example is the 2023 season by the Royal New Zealand Ballet of Romeo and Juliet presented in association with the New Zealand Symphony Orchestra (Wellington), Auckland Philharmonia Orchestra (Auckland) and the Christchurch Symphony Orchestra (Christchurch) and conducted by Hamish McKeich. Another example is 2021 performance of the play The Mourning After written and directed by Ahi Karunaharan, produced by Agaram Productions with music direction by Karnan Saba and live musicians of Isaac Smith, Tristian Carter, Senuka Sudusinghe and Deeksha Vijayakumar performing on-stage.

Many sound designers have started work in performing arts and have gone onto have successful film composition and sound design careers including Steve Gallagher. Gallagher won an Emmy Award for his sound editing work on The Beatles: Get Back. He was in the theatre company afterburner formed in 2001 by lighting designer and director Martyn Roberts, and also designed sound for other stage plays including Nga Tangata Toa by Hone Kouka.

=== Young people theatre ===
Capital E has the National Theatre for Children which creates and tours quality productions for children aged 2 – 12 years, and in the past the Capital E National Arts Festival with New Zealand and international performances. Performing Arts & Young People Aotearoa (PAYPA) is a national organisation of people working in performing arts 'for, by and with children and young people' in New Zealand. Young and Hungry was a festival (1995 and 2017) and a schools tour (2015–2022) that had many notable alumni including playwrights Eli Kent and Whiti Hereaka. Part of their goal was to train actors, designers, stage managers and other production people.

Companies that work with or for young people include the National Youth Theatre, Auckland, a musical theatre training programme established in 20225 that puts on two shows a year, and Calico Young People's Theatre (Napier). Theatre companies that have a youth programme include Auckland Theatre Company. Tim Bray Productions is a children's theatre company in Auckland who run workshops for children and present work.

National Youth Drama School Taiohi Whakaari Ā-Motu (NYDS) is an annual week-long performing arts school for young people in Hawke's Bay that has been running since the 1990s. They have workshops that include film, design, technical theatre, songwriting, editing, dance, circus skills and podcasting.

== Government New Zealand support for performing arts ==
Manatū Taonga Ministry for Culture and Heritage is the New Zealand Government ministry that includes performing arts in its mandate. They fund two non-governmental performing arts organisations, The Royal New Zealand Ballet and Te Matatini. They also fund the New Zealand Symphony Orchestra which is a Crown Entity. Manatū Taonga also fund the Crown Entity Creative New Zealand that manages funding for arts across Aotearoa including city council's Creative Communities fund. Creative New Zealand received in 2022 NZ$16.68m, 0.01% of the Government's core expenses.

Creative New Zealand, the Arts Council of New Zealand, changed the funding structure at the end of 2023 after consultation with the creative sector and criticism of the previous arts grant system.

== Performing arts festivals ==
- Te Matatini, a biennial nation-wide Māori performing arts festival and competition for kapa haka performers
- Kerikeri Arts Festival
- Auckland Arts Festival, annual arts and cultural festival held in Auckland
- Auckland Fringe Festival
- InterAct Disability Arts Festival annual three-day event in Auckland
- Pasifika Festival, a Pacific Islands-themed festival held annually in Western Springs, Auckland City
- Hamilton Gardens Arts Festival
- Bay of Islands Arts Festival UPSURGE
- Te Tairāwhiti Arts Festival – Gisborne
- Hawkes Bay Arts Festival
- Tauranga Festival of the Arts
- Taranaki International Arts Festival
- New Zealand Festival of the Arts, multi-arts biennial festival based in Wellington
- New Zealand Fringe Festival (held annually in Wellington)
- Kia Mau Festival in Wellington is a biennial event highlighting Māori and Pasifika
- CubaDupa, outdoor arts and music festival on Cuba Street in Wellington
- Nelson Arts Festival
- Nelson Fringe Festival
- Christchurch Arts Festival
- Festival Of Colour – Wānaka
- Dunedin Arts Festival, biennial festival in Dunedin
- Dunedin Fringe Festival, annual festival in Dunedin
- Southland Arts Festival
- Performance Arcade Wellington waterfront
- Tahi Festival - festival of solo theatre

=== Single genre ===
- New Zealand International Comedy Festival, annual event held simultaneously over three weeks during April/May in Auckland and Wellington
- New Zealand Improv Festival, annual improvisational theatre festival held in Wellington

=== Music festivals ===
See Music festivals in New Zealand

== Performing arts venues ==
There are many performing arts venues in New Zealand, most are custom built as venues for theatre, dance and concerts. There was a building period early in the 20th century, many of these large scale proscenium arch theatres still exist. Some have the same names such as the Civic Theatre, Auckland (built in 1929), the Civic Theatre, Invercargill (built in 1906), The Regent Theatre, Palmerston North (opened in 1930) and the Regent Theatre, Greymouth (opened in 1935).

Some performing arts venues are retrofits to make them suitable for performing arts such as the former Fortune Theatre in Dunedin which in 1978 took over the Trinity Methodist Church building, and The Meteor Theatre, Hamilton which was built in 1900 as a water bottling factory and then in the 1970s and 1980s was Skateworld, a skating rink and music venue before becoming The Meteor.

New Zealand's early 20th century theatres
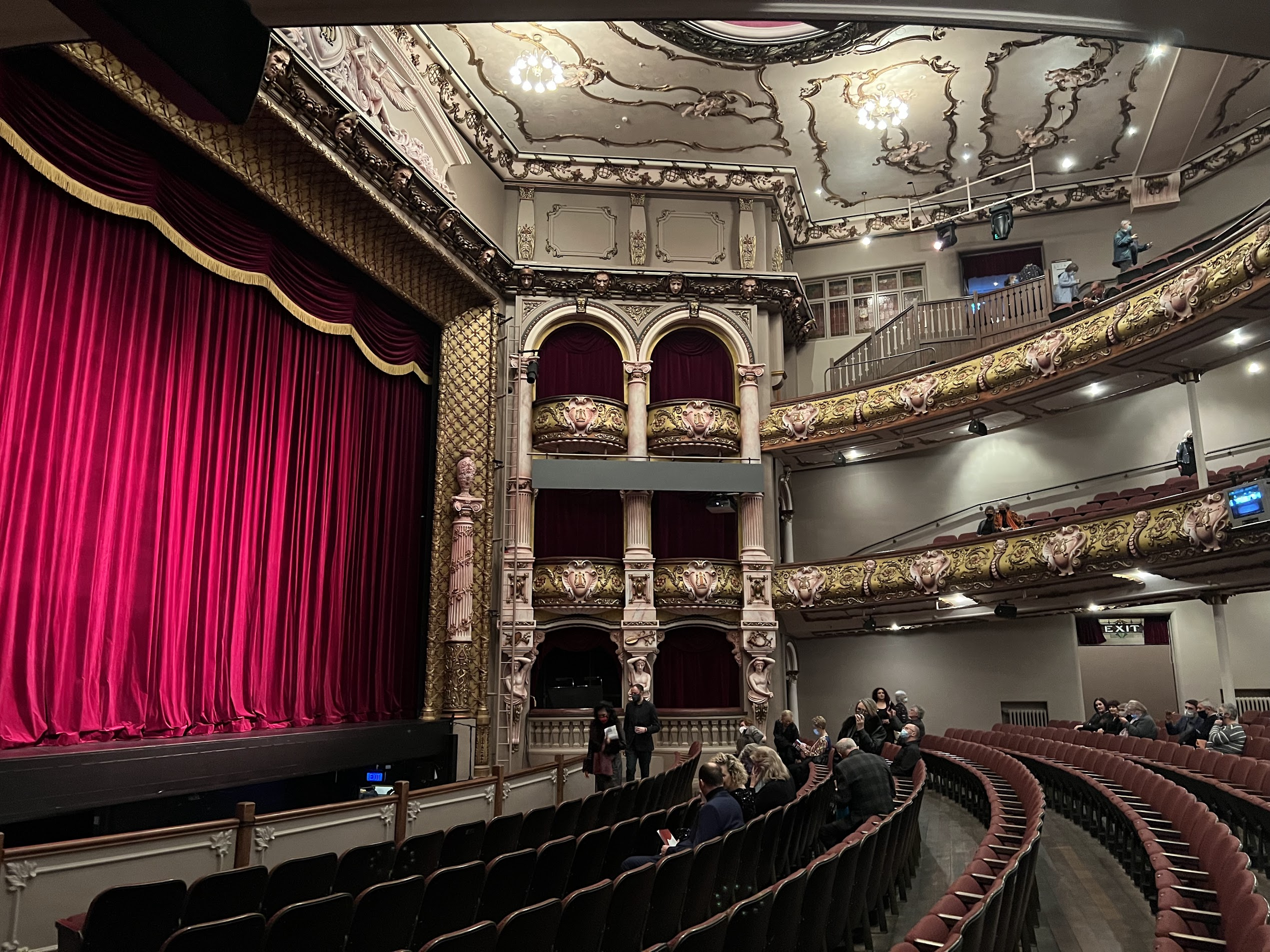
St James Theatre, Wellington (opened 1912)

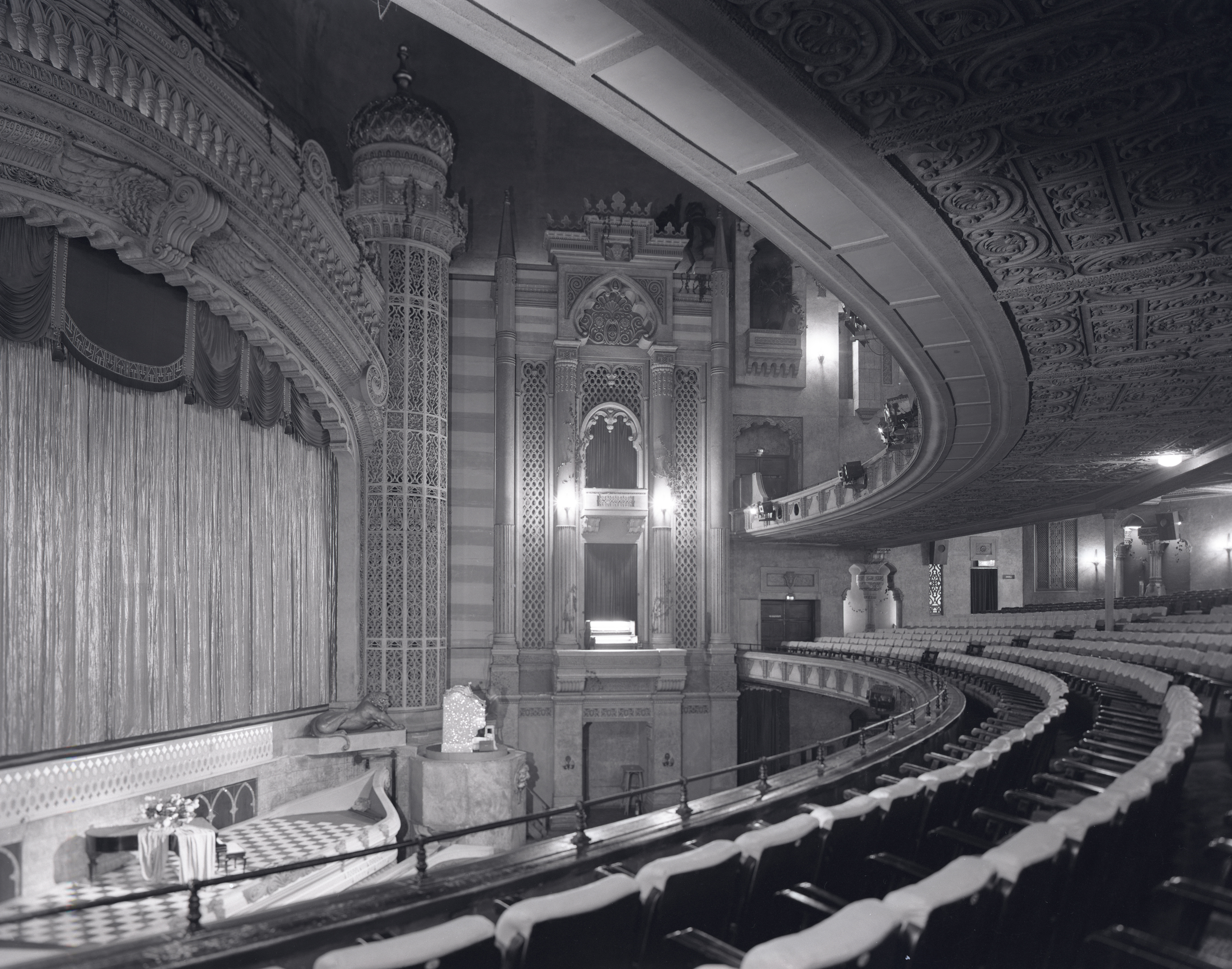
Civic Theatre, Auckland (opened 1929)

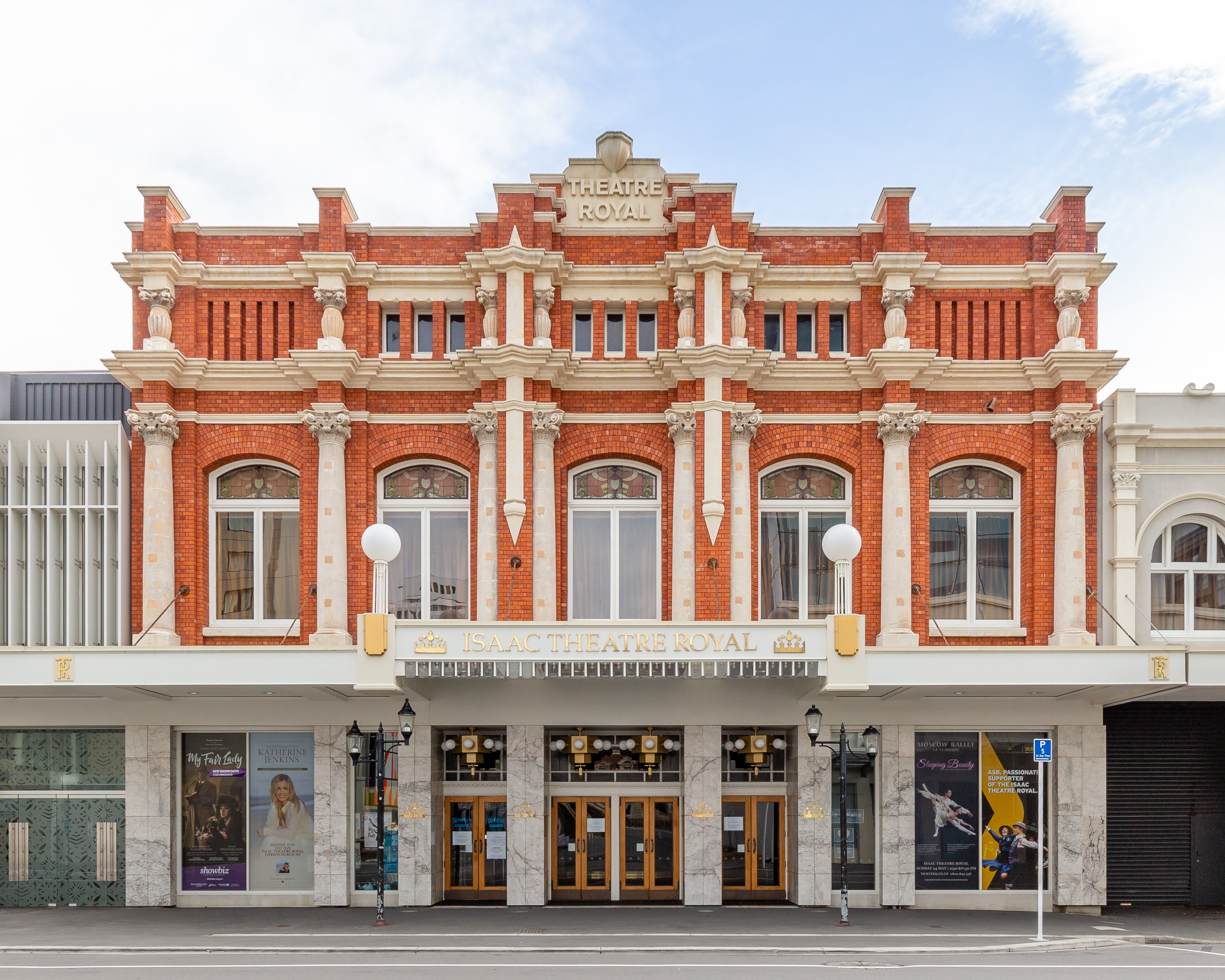
Isaac Theatre Royal, Christchurch (opened 1908)

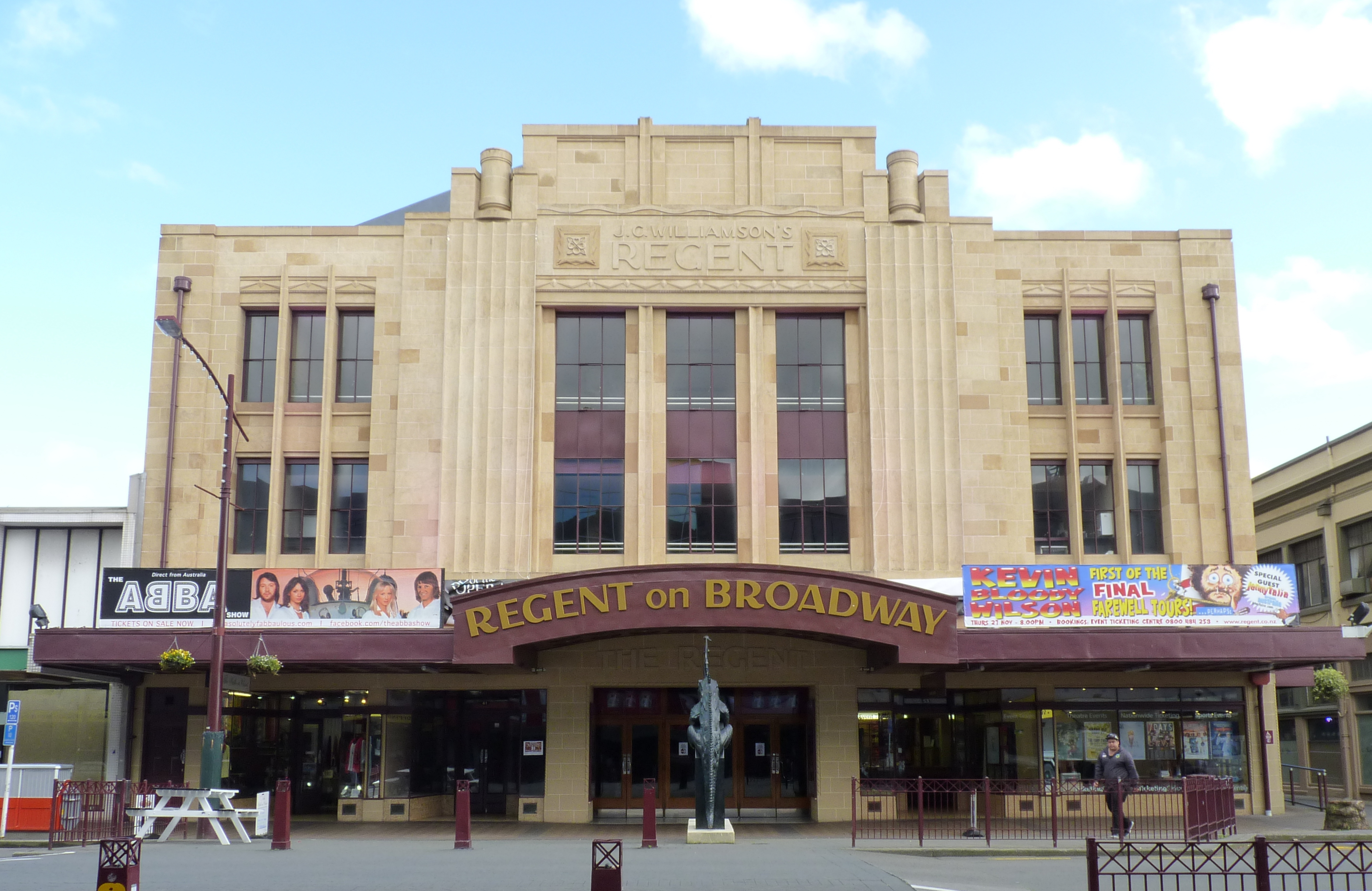
Regent on Broadway, Palmerston North (opened 1930)

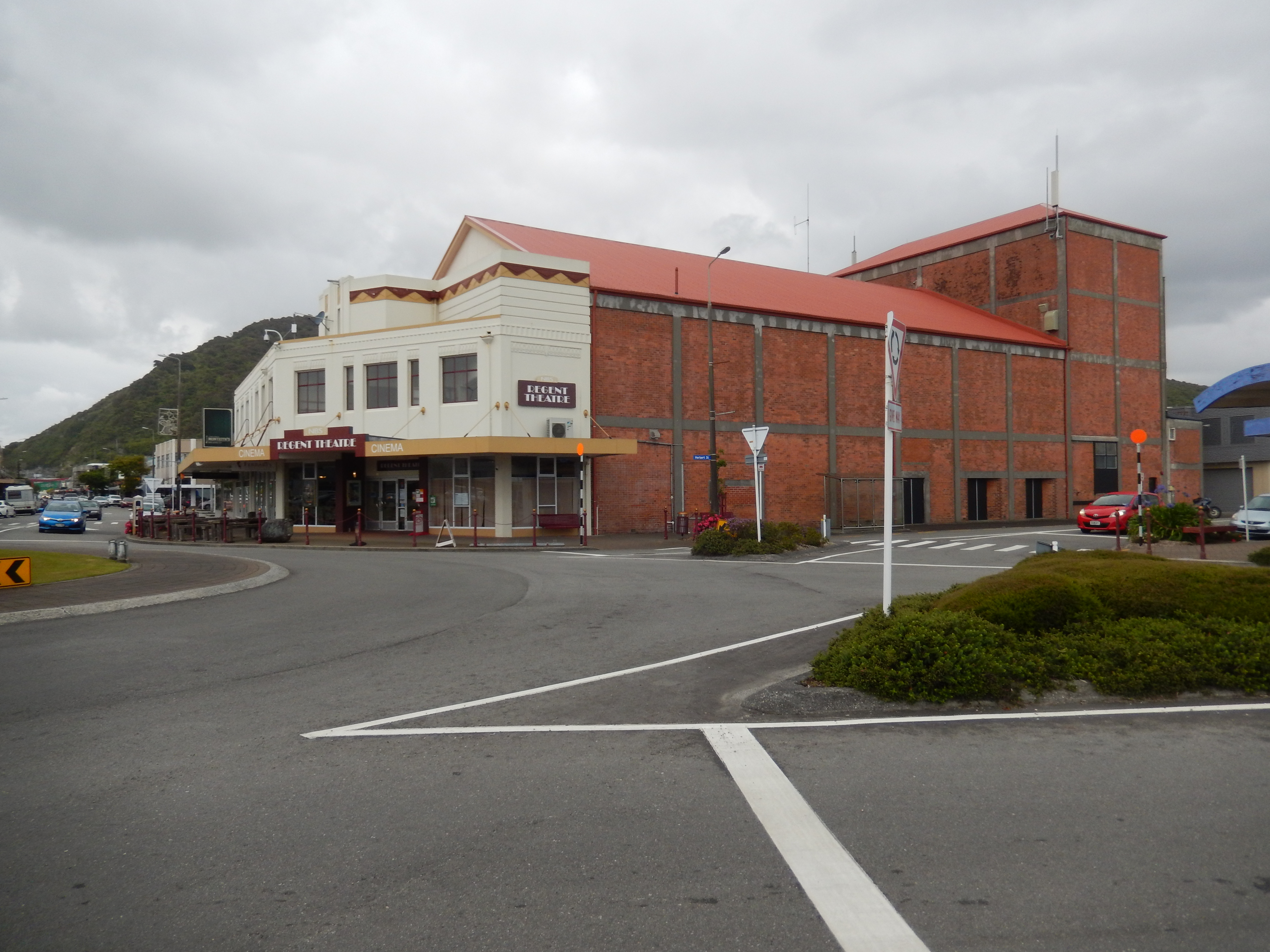
Regent Theatre, Greymouth (opened 1935)

== Awards and competitions ==
- Lexus Song Quest
- Aria Music Awards
- Dame Malvina Major Foundation
- Arts Pasifika Awards
- Te Waka Toi Awards
- Auckland Theatre Awards annual theatre awards in Auckland, from 2008
- Chapman Tripp Theatre Awards annual theatre awards in Wellington (1992–2014)
- Ngā Whakarākei O Whātaitai / Wellington Theatre Awards annual theatre awards in Wellington established in 2015 to replace Chapman Tripp Theatre Awards
- Arts Access Aotearoa Awards
- Benny Award, awarded by Variety Artists Club of New Zealand for a lifetime of excellence in their field of the performing arts
- Grand Master of Magic Award, awarded by the Brotherhood of Auckland Magicians, for a lifetime of excellence in the magical arts
- Adam NZ Play Award (etc.)
- Arts Foundation awards

== Industry bodies ==
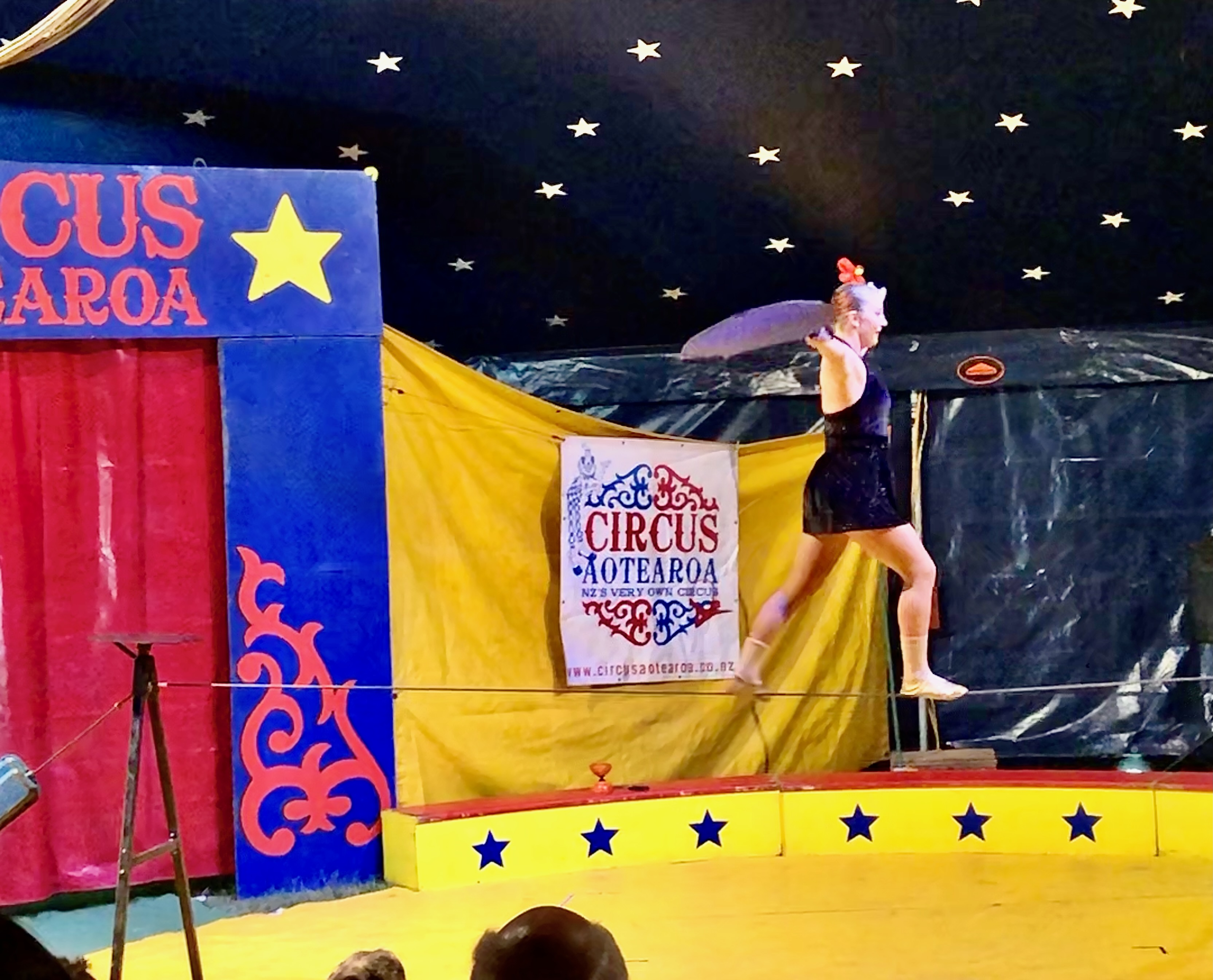
Tightrope performance at Circus Aotearoa in 2020

- Aotearoa New Zealand Circus Association (ANZCA) - since 2015
- Arts Access Aotearoa – advocacy network
- Entertainment Technology New Zealand (ETNZ)
- Entertainment Venues Association Of New Zealand (EVANZ)
- Skills Active – manage vocational training for technicians and stage managers
- Musical Theatre New Zealand (MTNZ)
- Playmarket – playwright agent and publisher of plays
- Women's Play Press – publisher of plays
- Theatre New Zealand – umbrella for amateur community theatre

== See also ==
- Literature in New Zealand
