= Tupe Lualua =

New Zealand-Samoan choreographer

Tupe Lualua MNZM
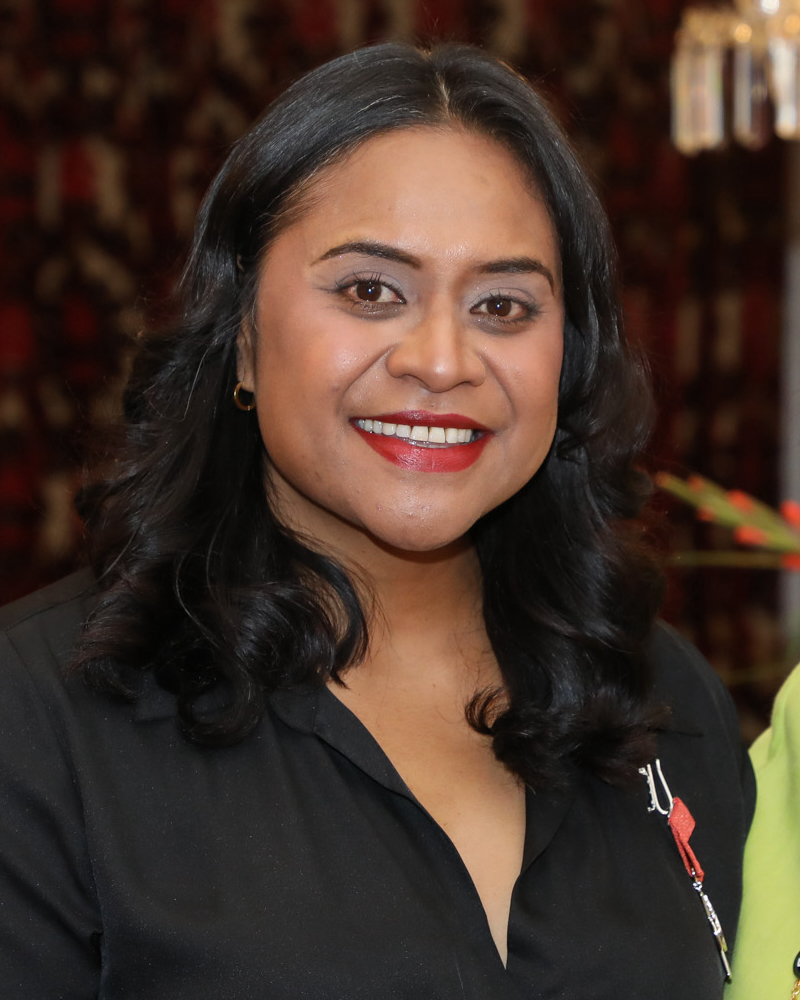
- Lualua in 2024
- Education: Whitireia
- Occupations: Director, dancer, choreographer, producer, performer, actor, tutor, lecturer
- Organization(s): Measina Festival, Le Moana
- Website: www.lemoanaarts.com/measina-2022

Tupe Lualua MNZM is a New Zealand–Samoan choreographer, director, founder of the dance company Le Moana. She is the artistic director and producer for the Measina Festival, and has worked with choreographer Tupua Tigafua. In 2019, Lualua was the Creative New Zealand Samoa artist-in-residence.

== Biography ==
Lualua studied performing arts at Whitireia New Zealand and Victoria University of Wellington. She founded a dance company called Le Moana, which creates 'Pacific contemporary dance and theatre'. Le Moana has performed at the Pacific Dance New Zealand Festival in Auckland, the San Diego International Fringe Festival and in Samoa.

Prior to founding Le Moana Lualua managed the Waka Ura Cultural Dance Company (2005 -2008) which won the Emerging Artist Award at the Arts Pasfika Awards in 2007. As a maker and performer her work includes Poly-Zygotic (2009) devised by and featuring, Tupe Lualua, Taofi Mose-Tuiloma & Asalemo Tofete and the Pacific Island musical The Factory (2011). The Factory was proposed by one reviewer to be 'The Great Kiwi Musical' and was first presented at the Mangare Arts Centre with many well-known artists involved produced by the Kila Kokonut Krew. Written by Vela Manusaute, directed by Manusaute and Anapela Polataivano and composed by Poulima Salima with choreography by Siaosi Mulipola and design by Sean Coyle it is said to be the New Zealand’s first Pacific Island musical. Lualua played one of the machinists at the clothing 'factory'.

In 2013, Lualua devised and directed Fatu na Toto reflecting her experience of growing up in Porirua, Wellington. It premiered at the New Zealand Fringe Festival and went on to the Tempo Dance Festival. In 2015, Lualua wrote and directed the dance theatre production 1918 about the Spanish Influenza pandemic in Samoa, collaborating with Andy Faiaoga as choreographer.

The Measina Festival was started in 2014 by Lualua's company Le Moana to showcase contemporary Pacific dance and theatre. In 2017, Lualua directed Watercress Tuna and the Children of Champion Street at the festival based on the children’s story by Patricia Grace with 70 students from Cannon’s Creek School and choreographers Tehau Winitana, Oriwa Mitchell and Sophia Uele.

In 2020, Lualua featured as one of several artists in The Transform Series, distributed digitally by Pacific Dance. Lualua shared her knowledge regarding the political history of Samoa, and how this connects to the performances of the Ma'ulu'ulu and Taualuga.

Lualua wrote and directed Purple Onion about a famous burlesque parlour in Wellington. It was produced by Le Moana and first presented in the Kia Mau Festival in 2017.

== Honours and awards ==
In 2019, as the Creative New Zealand Samoa Artist in Residence, she worked with 13 young men in Samoa to create a dance show about their role in traditional Samoan village society. It was performed at the National University of Samoa in November 2019.

Lualua won the Contemporary Pacific Artist Award at the 2021 Arts Pasifika Awards.

For her contributions towards the Pacific arts sector, Lualua was awarded one of two FAME Mid-Career Award FAME Trust (Fund for Acting and Musical Endeavours) in 2022.

In the 2024 New Year Honours, Lualua was appointed a Member of the New Zealand Order of Merit, for services to the arts.
