= Jennie Anderson =

Jennie Anderson may refer to:

- Jennie Anderson Froiseth (1849–1930), founder of the Blue Tea, a literary club for women who were not Mormon in Utah Territory
- Jennie Franks, English playwright and filmmaker, married Ian Anderson
- Jane Whiteside (1855–1875), New Zealand tightrope dancer, gymnast and magician, also known as Jennie Anderson
