= Estelle Chout =

New Zealand actor and writer

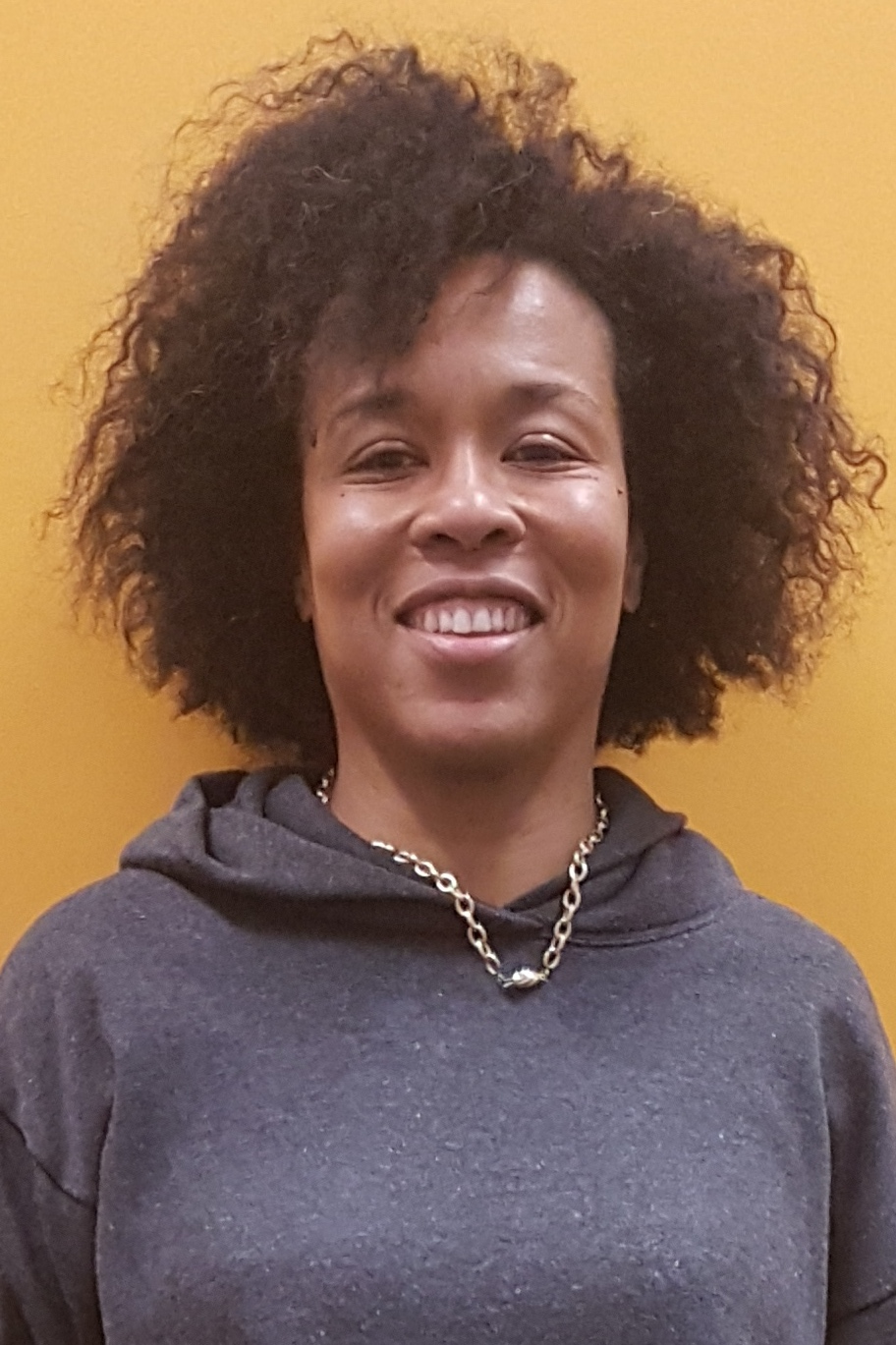
Chout in 2021

Estelle Chout is an Afro-Caribbean queer playwright and actor based in New Zealand. Her semi auto-biographical play Po' Boys and Oysters, premiered in 2022. Chout was the first black female to be on the shortlist of the Adam NZ Play Award in 2021.

Chout moved to New Zealand 2017. Her heritage is from Martinique in the Caribbean and she grew up there.

Chouts first play Po' Boys and Oysters was to be shown at the Auckland Pride Festival in 2022 but was cancelled due to Covid-19 restrictions. It ended up being performed at the Basement Theatre in Auckland. Chout was one of the performers alongside Layla Pitt and Sandra Zvenyika. Dione Joseph directed the play. Reviewer Jess Karamjeet described Chout's writing as 'subtle and full of natural points of humour'. It was produced by Black Creatives Aotearoa.

This play of Chout's is unique as the first to present the migrant experience of African-Caribbean New Zealanders. The play was updated by Chout with dramaturgy by Ahi Karunaharan and presented again in 2025 at the Herald Theatre in Auckland. Reviewer Aroha Awarau described it as 'unapologetically Black, uniquely queer, and distinctly Kiwi'. The play was presented as part of the first Aotearoa Festival of Black Arts.

Chout runs an accountancy practice. She previously worked as a finance professional.
