= The Barden Party =

Theatre company in New Zealand

- Formation: 2021
- Type: Theatre group
- Purpose: Musical Shakespeare, site-specific performances
- Location: Nelson, New Zealand
- Artistic director: Laura Irish
- Website: thebardenparty.com

The Barden Party, based in Nelson, New Zealand, is a theatre company best known for offering musical Shakespeare in outdoor settings. The company has been in operation since 2021, and has toured in New Zealand, Australia and America.

== Formation ==
The company was formed during the second COVID-19 lockdown in mid-2021. As theatre shows were being cancelled on public health grounds, actor Laura Irish had the idea to create outdoor performances which would be less likely to be cancelled. Irish is originally from Chicago, Illinois but had at that point been based in Nelson for fourteen years. She trained at the Stella Adler Studio of Acting in New York and the Sidney Poitier Film School in Los Angeles, and has a master's of arts management from Auckland University of Technology. The concept for the company was "a musical troupe of actors presenting fun and lively Shakespearean comedy in people’s yards".

== Shakespeare performances ==
The Barden Party's first performance was A Midsummer Night's Dream, which featured pop songs and folk ballads. The original run of five shows in Nelson became more than fifty shows across New Zealand. The show appeared in the Dunedin Fringe Festival in 2022, where it won the Excellence Award. The company also toured A Midsummer Night's Dream through a further ten performances in eight states in the USA.

In 2023, the company performed Cocktales, a play combining Shakespeare and Edgar Allen Poe. Romeo and Juliet played in New Zealand and at the Adelaide Fringe Festival in Australia in 2024. It won the Best Theatre Week One Adelaide Fringe 2024 award. The company has also performed a 'rockabilly cowboy' inspired Much Ado About Nothing, which toured New Zealand. Their 2025 Macbeth included bluegrass music, and was awarded a Best of Theatre & Physical Theatre Week 2 Award at the Adelaide Fringe 2025.

In August 2025 The Barden Party performed Macbeth at the Edinburgh Festival Fringe, earning a five star review from Theatre Weekly.

== Other projects ==
In 2023 the company staged Butterfly Smokescreen in collaboration with Sydney-based Jetpack Theatre. The show was an original immersive production co-written by Irish and Jetpack founder Jim Fishwick. The play is based on the story of the death of film producer Thomas Ince after a party on Randolph Hearst's yacht in 1924. The performances took place on Auckland super yacht Sea Breeze III, owned by EGG company founder Charlotte Devereaux.
