= Vela Manusaute =

New Zealand film director

- Born: Niue
- Occupation(s): Writer, Director

Vela Manusaute is a Niuean writer and director. He is the creator and writer of New Zealand's first bilingual English-Tongan television series, Brutal Lives - Mo'ui Faingata'a.

== Background ==
Vela is part Niuean and part Samoan; he was born in Niue and lived in his village Mutalau before his family moved to New Zealand in 1979. He graduated from Toi Whakaari: New Zealand Drama School in 1995 with a Diploma in Acting, and was their first Niuean to graduate. In 2002 he founded the theatre and music group Kila Kokonut Krew.

== Filmography ==
| Year | Title | Role | Notes |
|---|---|---|---|
| 2007 | The Tattooist | Actor - Taxi Driver 2 | Television |
| 2010 | Matariki | Actor - Russ | Television |
| 2013 | The Factory | Executive producer, actor - Mason | Web series |
| 2018 | The Messiah | Director | Short film |
| 2020 | Educators | Actor - Vela | Television |
| 2020 | Brutal Lives - Mo'ui Faingata'a | Director | Television |

== Awards ==
In 1997 he won the Best Male Comedy award at the Chapman Tripp Theatre Awards as one half of comedy duo The Brownies.

With Anapela Polataivao he received the New Generation Award for theatre at the 2014 Arts Foundation Awards.

In 2020 he won the Best Screenplay and Best Art Directions awards for his short film The Messiah at the Pacific Rims Film Festival 2020.
