= Arts Access Aotearoa =

Charitable trust in New Zealand

- Whakahauhau Katoa o Hanga
- Formation: 1995
- Founded at: Wellington
- Type: Charitable trust
- Registration no.: CC33533
- Purpose: Arts Access Aotearoa advocates for all people in New Zealand to have access to the arts by supporting people who experience barriers to participation or whose access is limited.
- Headquarters: Toi Poneke, Wellington Arts Centre
- Location: Level 3, 61–63 Abel Smith Street
- Coordinates: 41.296099°S 174.773284°E
- Region served: Wellington
- Fields: Arts
- Official language: English
- Executive Director: Richard Benge
- Affiliations: Creative New Zealand, Department of Corrections, Foundation North, Wellington City Council
- Website: artsaccess.org.nz

Arts Access Aotearoa was established as a charitable trust in 1995 with funding from Creative New Zealand. It was created primarily to meet a key objective of the Arts Council of New Zealand Toi Aotearoa Act 1994: that is, to support "the availability of projects of merit to communities or sections of the population that would otherwise not have access to them". Arts Access Aotearoa’s main areas of focus are supporting disabled people to create and participate in art of all kinds; encouraging performing arts companies, venues, producers and artists to increase their accessibility; and facilitating arts-based rehabilitative projects and programmes in prisons. It receives core funding from Creative New Zealand and has a major contract with the Department of Corrections. It also has support and sponsorship from local government, philanthropic trusts and businesses around New Zealand.

== Key activities ==
=== Arts Access Awards ===
Every year, it presents the Arts Access Awards in Parliament. Formerly called the Big ‘A’ Awards, and as of 2018 named the Te Putanga Toi Arts Access Awards, they were introduced in 2007 to recognise the contribution of individuals and organisations in providing access to the arts. There are currently seven awards, including a Community Partnership award, a Museum award, two Arts in Corrections awards the Arts Access Artistic Achievement Award for artists with a disability or lived experience of mental ill-health, and an Arts Access Accolade, presented to someone who has made a significant contribution to accessibility.

=== Arts For All Network ===
The Arts For All initiative began in late 2010 with the release of Arts For All: Ngā toi mō te katoa, a practical guide about ways that arts organisations, museums and galleries can improve and encourage access. The Arts for All Network was established as an ongoing programme in 2011. Networks have been established in Wellington, Auckland, Canterbury, Otago and Taranaki and bring together representatives from the disability sector, arts and cultural organisations, and venues to share resources and ideas about building new audiences by improving access for disabled people. Since 2011, the programme has seen significant improvements in access: for example, audio described and sign interpreted performances are now a regular feature of many performing arts companies.

=== Creative spaces ===
A recognised part of the social services in New Zealand, creative spaces provide a space, a sense of community, resources and support for people to produce art or participate in artistic activities such as theatre, dance, visual arts, creative writing and music. Many are exclusively used by people with disabilities or lived experience of mental ill health, while others are open to a broader cross-section of the community such as youth, unemployed people and people in the criminal justice system. It is estimated that there are around 80 or more creative spaces throughout New Zealand. These include Vincents Art Workshop in Wellington, the first such space established in 1985, as well as Artsenta, which opened in Dunedin in 1986.

=== Arts in Corrections ===
Arts Access Aotearoa has a long-standing relationship with the Department of Corrections to facilitate and advise on arts projects and programmes in prisons throughout New Zealand. This has resulted in some exciting initiatives such as an exhibition of prison art in Parliament and a week-long theatre workshop and performance in Arohata Prison led by German theatre director Uta Plate. Other successful projects include two quilting groups run by volunteer quilters, and ballet workshops led by the Royal New Zealand Ballet.
