= Hamilton Musical Theatre =

New Zealand musical theatre company

- Founded: 1978
- Type: Amateur musical theatre organisation
- Purpose: Musical theatre
- Headquarters: Hamilton, New Zealand
- Region served: New Zealand
- Formerly called: Musikmakers

Hamilton Musical Theatre is an amateur musical theatre organisation based in Hamilton, New Zealand. It was formerly known as Musikmakers.

== Brief history ==
Musikmakers was registered as an Incorporated Society in 1978, but the society did not find a permanent home until the council purchased the building which had been home to the Orange Garden Cabaret on Riverlea Rd. In 1984, Musikmakers was part of a cooperative venture between Playbox, the Theatre Technique Trust and the Waikato Society of Potters to establish the Riverlea Theatre and Arts Centre.

The society performed musical theatre under the Musikmakers name until April 2021, when the society was re-incorporated as the Hamilton Musical Theatre. The first performance given under the new name was A Funny Thing Happened on the Way to the Forum, with music by Stephen Sondheim, in May 2021. This was the first major production since the easing of restrictions because of the COVID-19 pandemic.

== Examples of shows staged ==
- A Funny Thing Happened on the Way to the Forum
- All Shook Up
- Chicago
- Fiddler on the Roof
- Godspell
- Grease
- Les Misérables
- Oklahoma!
- Oliver!
- The King and I
- The Producers
- Seven Brides for Seven Brothers
- Show Boat
- South Pacific
