= Indian Ink Theatre Company =

Theatre company in New Zealand

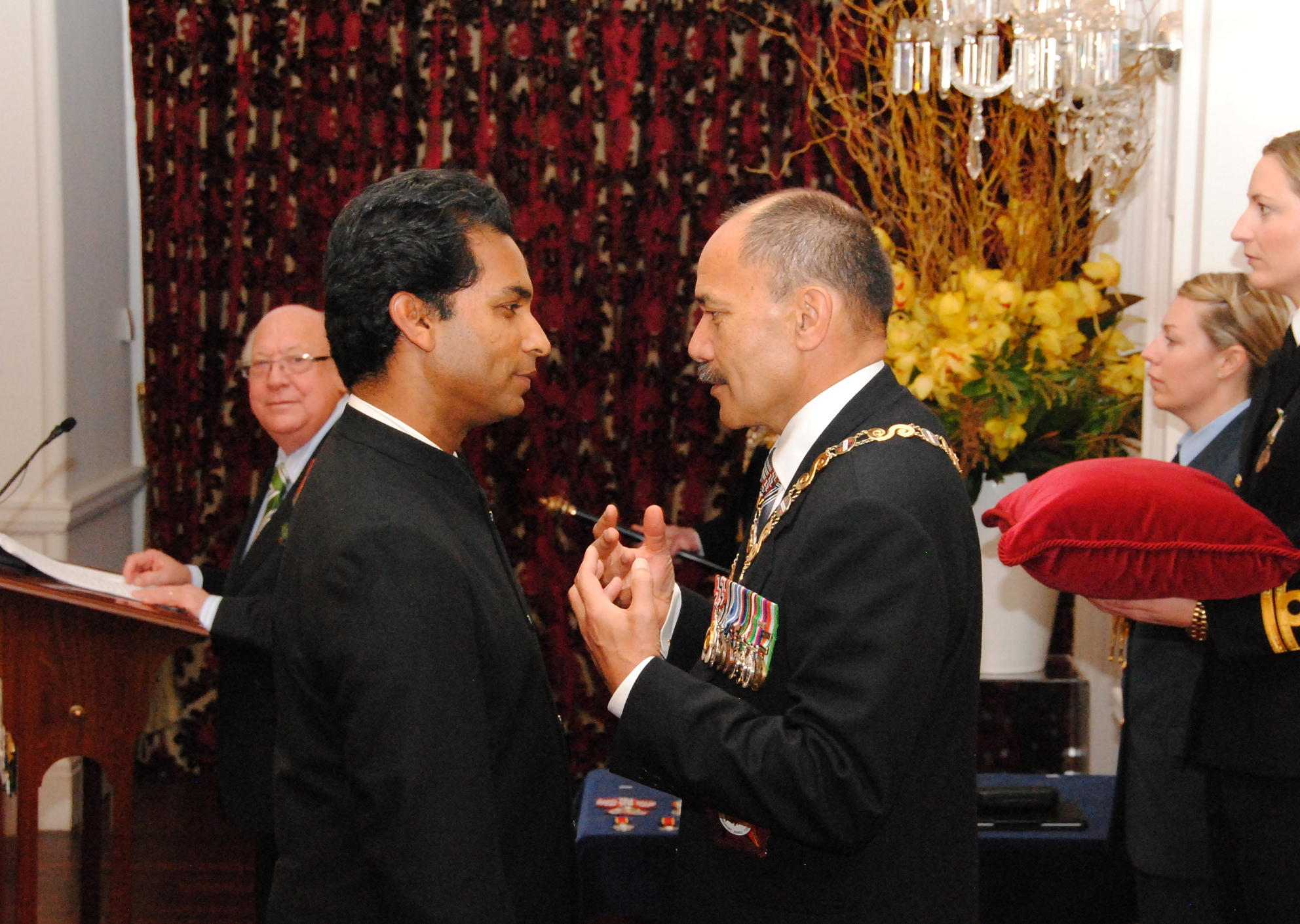
Jacob Rajan (left), at his investiture as a Member of the New Zealand Order of Merit, for services to theatre, by the governor-general, Sir Jerry Mateparae, on 23 May 2013

Indian Ink Theatre Company is a New Zealand theatre company founded by actor Jacob Rajan MNZM (b. 1966) and director/writer Justin Lewis (b. 1967). Founded in 1996, Indian Ink's first theatrical production was Krishnan's Dairy, which went on to win the Chapman Tripp Award for Production of the Year (1997). The following year Krishnan's Dairy presented in the bigger theatre Downstage Theatre and was so popular the season was extended by five shows. Over the years Indian Ink's productions have been toured through New Zealand and overseas with presentations including Krishnan's Dairy, The Candlestick Maker, and The Pickle King. Its most recent production is Dirty Work: An Ode to Joy (2023).

Kiss the Fish (2013) was heavily influenced by Balinese masks and gamelan and Rajan and Lewis had studied in Indonesia. The original title of the play was Monkeys and Men.

New Zealand theatre-maker Murray Edmond has been dramaturg with Indian Ink.

== Plays ==
- "Krishnan's Dairy", 1997
- "The Candlestickmaker", 2000
- "The Pickle King", 2002
- "The Dentist's Chair", 2008
- "Guru of Chai", 2010
- "Kiss the Fish", 2013
- "The Elephant Thief", 2015
- "Welcome to the Murder House", 2018
- "Mrs Krishnan's Party", 2019
- "Paradise or the Impermanence of Ice Cream", 2021
- "Dirty Work: An Ode to Joy", 2023

== Awards ==
- 1997: Chapman Tripp Theatre Awards, Production of the Year: Krishnan's Dairy
- 1999: Edinburgh Festival Fringe First Award: "Krishnan's Dairy"
- 2010: Chapman Tripp Theatre Awards, New New Zealand Play of the Year: "The Pickle King"
- 2014: Chapman Tripp Theatre Awards, New New Zealand Play of the Year: "Guru of Chai"
