= Suitcase Theatre =

Theatre company in Dunedin, New Zealand

- Type: Theatre group
- Members: Helen Fearnley, Sofie Welvaert, Laura Wells
- Website: https://suitcasetheatredunedin.wordpress.com/

Suitcase Theatre is a theatre company based in Dunedin, New Zealand.

In 2014 the company's production Mental Notes was awarded best community event at the Dunedin Theatre Awards.

In 2017 Suitcase Theatre produced a flash-mob style performance of scenes from Jane Austen at the Dunedin Public Library, to commemorate the 200th anniversary of the death of Jane Austen. Performers included Emer Lyons, Gabby Golding, Kimberley Buchan, Brook Bray, Sofie Welvaert and Yvonne Jessop.

The planned Dunedin Fringe Festival 2020 production of Dear Boobs on Stage, a breast-cancer themed show, was re-booked at the Regent Theatre for September of that year due to Covid-19.
