= Dione Joseph =

Zealand theatre director

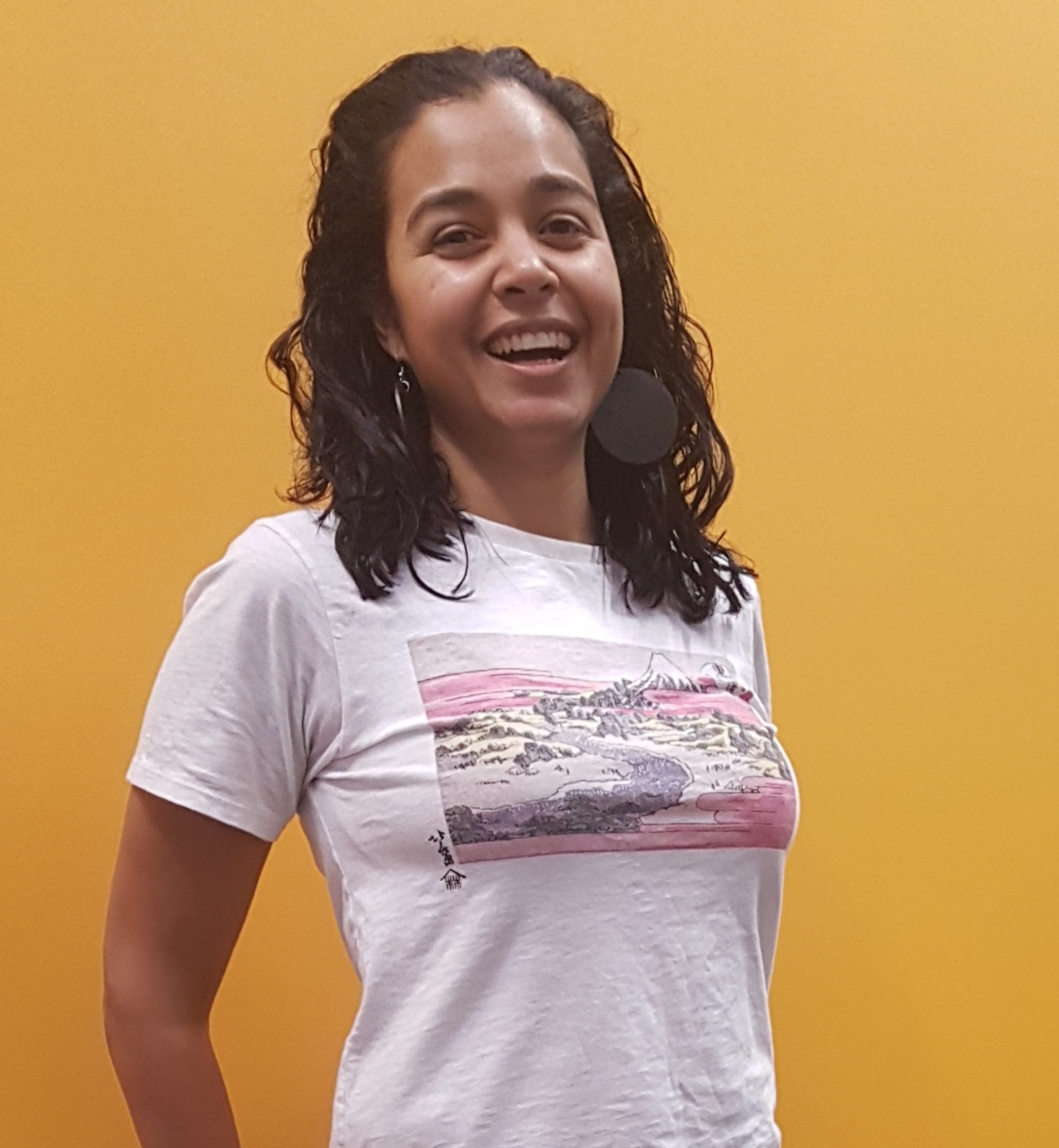
Image of Dione Joseph

Dione Joseph is an artistic director, theatre director, theatre critic, essayist, and motivational speaker based in New Zealand. She founded Black Creatives Aotearoa. She also co-founded JK Productions Ltd: He Kōrero Ngā Tahi (Telling Our Stories Together).

== Career ==
Dione Joseph founded New Zealand-based, Black Creatives Aotearoa (BCA) in 2018 to provide resources and support for African and Afro-Caribbean heritage artists in New Zealand. As Artistic Director, she leads a team of volunteers focused on expanding opportunities and visibility for this community. The organisation also mentors young talent and develops works by indigenous people and people of colour.

JK Productions Ltd. was founded in 2013 by her and husband Jimmy James Kouratoras. It is a New Zealand-based arts organization dedicated to international creative collaboration. Their focus is on arts and international collaboration, producing and facilitating artistic projects that span across different countries and cultures.

Joseph works extensively as a theatre director, dramaturge and critic focused on culturally diverse voices. She has directed plays, musicals, experimental projects in NZ, Australia, the USA and beyond. Her writing appears in outlets like the New Zealand Herald, Te Kaharoa, Academia.edu, and she has served as theatre critic for publications such as Australian Stage.

Joseph has several written articles and essays across various publications and academia, including Muck Rack and Right Now. Some of the academic papers, include “In the Balance: Indigeneity, Performance, Globalization” and "Performing Difference Differently: New Ways of Doing, Old Ways of Seeing"

Joseph has been featured in several interviews, including one by Radio New Zealand. She has also been a speaker at the Innovation Unit 3.

Joseph has directed several plays, including “America Rex” (2018) by Tom Minter and “Po' Boys and Oysters" (2022) by Estelle Chout.

== Awards ==
She is the recipient of numerous awards and residencies, including a 2013 Australian Creative Young Stars grant and 2014 fellowship at Lincoln Centre Directors Lab in New York.

Joseph is mixed-race, of Caribbean, Anglo-Indian, French and Irish heritage. She moved to New Zealand in 2002 at the age of 14.

Joseph founded community arts organisation Black Creatives Aotearoa to support the creativity of people of African and Afro-Caribbean heritage in New Zealand.
