= Jane Whiteside =

New Zealand tightrope dancer, gymnast, magician (1855–1875)

- Born: 5 February 1855; Tullylish, Ireland
- Died: 17 January 1875 (aged 19); Mackenzie Basin, New Zealand
- Other names: Jennie Anderson, Jane Verten, Miss Blanche Anderson, Mademoiselle Estella, Madame Blanche, Blanche Fane
- Occupation(s): Dancer, gymnast, magician

Jane Whiteside (5 February 1855 – 17 January 1875) was a notable New Zealand tightrope dancer, gymnast and magician. She was born in Tullylish, Ireland in 1855, to John Whiteside (a weaver) and Jane Whiteside.

When she was young, her father joined the 65th Regiment and moved the family to New Zealand. They sailed on the Lancashire Witch on April 17, 1856, eventually landing in Wellington on July 21. The family moved around several times, eventually settling in Ōtāhuhu.

Whiteside first studied as an acrobat, tightrope walker, and trapeze artist, but may have given it up as the result of an accident at age 17. She then turned to magic instead, after seeing the American magician Cora De Lamond (born Ursula Bush) perform.

She eventually joined Frank Verten and Harry Seymour's theatre company Oxford Combination Troupe. She used various stage names, including Mademoiselle Estella, Madame Blanche, Blanche Fane, and Miss Blanche Anderson. She eventually married Verten.

Whiteside died on January 17, 1875, after drowning in New Zealand at the border of Otago and Canterbury. She is buried at the Old Oamaru Cemetery.

== See also ==
- Story: Whiteside, Jane
