= Dunedin Fringe Festival =

Annual 11-day festival in New Zealand

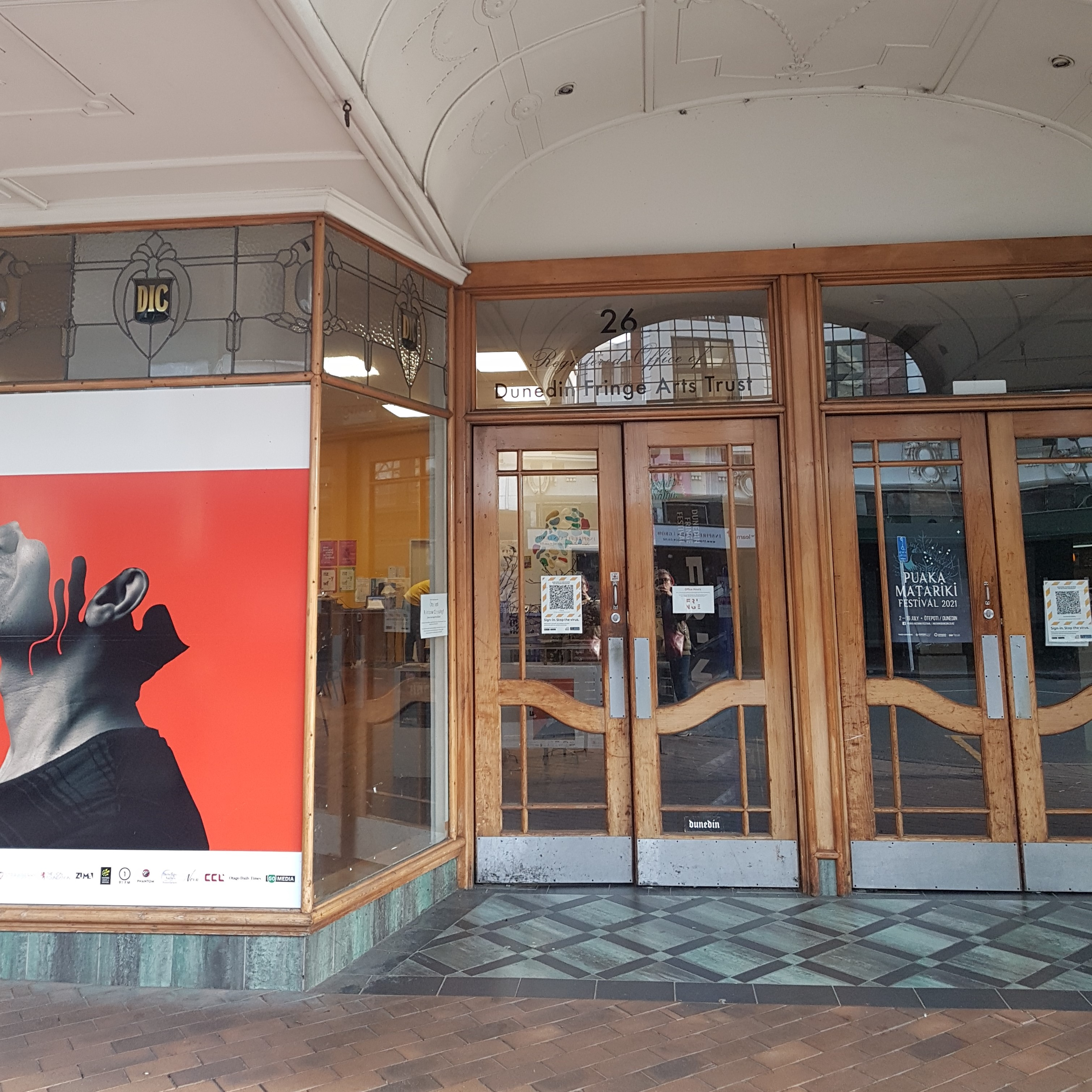
Fringe Festival Office Dunedin

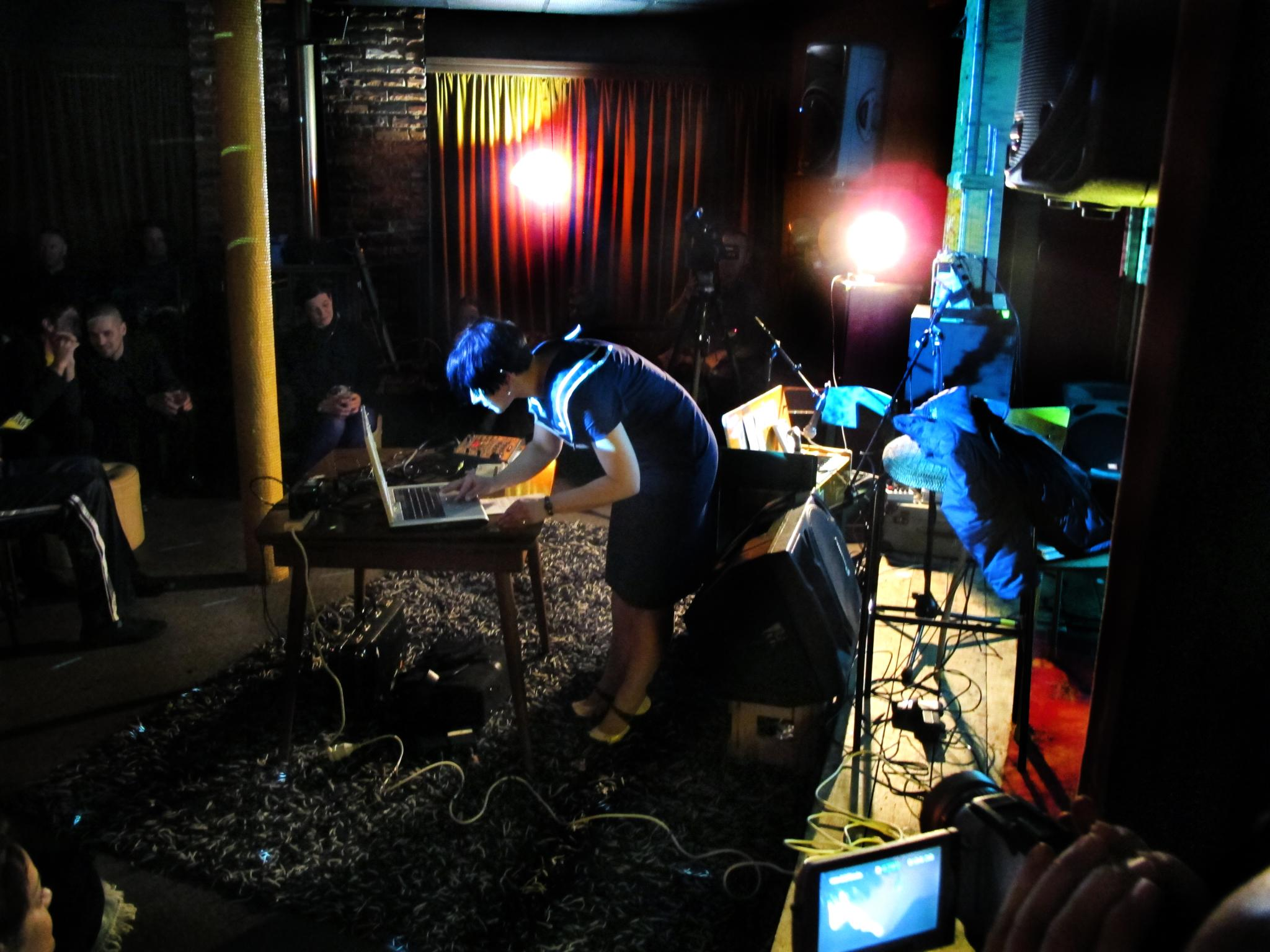
Stanier Black-Five performing at the 2011 festival

The Dunedin Fringe Festival, or Dunedin Fringe, is an 11-day fringe arts festival held each March in Dunedin, New Zealand. Initiated in the year 2000, Dunedin Fringe aims to bring experimental contemporary art to a wider audience and to support the work of emerging artists, attracting artists from throughout New Zealand and overseas.

Independent artist events form the backbone of the Dunedin Fringe Festival and are facilitated through an open-access registration process. This takes place from August – October each year. Funding assistance is made available to New Zealand artists.

While the festival programme primarily features independently produced events by artists, it also promotes a handful of high-profile special events run by the festival including an opening night event on the eve of the festival, and late night line up shows.

Events take place in a wide range of locations across Dunedin's City Centre and suburbs, from theatres to bars, museums to churches, and cycleways to shop windows.

In 2021, over 27,000 people attended artist and festival-produced events.

== Dunedin Fringe Arts Trust ==
The Dunedin Fringe Arts Trust was established in 2004 to support the successful production of the Dunedin Fringe Festival. The trust also supports the delivery of other programmes such as the New Zealand Young Writers Festival and the Amped Music Project.

The current directors of the Dunedin Fringe Arts Trust are Kate Schrader and Ruth Harvey. Schrader and Harvey have served as co-directors since 2022, when they took over from Gareth McMillan who had been in the role since 2017.

== Programme ==
In addition to theatrical performances, the festival hosts dancers and live music. In 2016, artists produced 55 shows. The festival is open-access, which means that anyone who registers may perform.

In 2020 there were cancellations to the programme due to COVID-19. Suitcase Theatre rescheduled and presented a performance of Boobs on Stage about breast cancer previously scheduled for a small space to the large Regent Theatre but with the social distancing of the audience to positive reviews.
