= Kila Kokonut Krew =

Theatre company and music producer in New Zealand

Kila Kokonut Krew is a theatre company and music producer in Auckland, New Zealand. They have produced 12 music albums, a web series, a TV skit series as well as theatre productions.

The company was started by Toi Whakaari graduates Anapela Polataivao and Vela Manusaute in Manurewa, South Auckland, in 2002, along with 11 other Pasifika artists.

Their first production was comedy/drama Taro King by Manusaute, which was revived in August 2012 at the Mangere Arts Centre for the tenth birthday of the Krew. The play revolves around Manusaute's experiences working in a supermarket in Otara. Manusaute and Polataivao co-directed the cast, which included Goretti Chadwick and Aleni Tufuga.

Other productions included the Pasifika musical The Factory, which played at three locations in Auckland and the 2014 Edinburgh Festival Fringe, and the comedy Once Were Samoans.
