= Ela To'omaga-Kaikilekofe =

New Zealand artist

- Born: Porirua, New Zealand
- Known for: Muliti-disciplinary artist
- Awards: Special Recognition, Arts Pasifika Awards (2014)

Ela To'omaga-Kaikilekofe (born 1969) is a New Zealand visual artist and arts administrator based in New Caledonia. Her work is in the collection of New Zealand's national museum Te Papa and in 2014 she was recognised at the annual Arts Pasifika Awards. She is one of the founding members of the Société Itinérante d’Artistes du Pacifique et d’Océanie (Siapo association).

== Biography ==
To'omaga-Kaikilekofe was born and raised in Porirua just north of Wellington, New Zealand. She is of Samoan heritage from Falelatai Siufaga and Safaʻatoa Lefaga. She studied at Whitireia New Zealand and received a certificate in craft art and design.

To'omaga-Kaikilekofe visual arts practice includes work as a jeweller and sculptor.

To'omaga-Kaikilekofe moved to Nouméa in 2001 and was still based in New Caledonia as at 2014. At the Creative New Zealand Arts Pasifika Awards in 2914 To'omaga-Kaikilekofe received a special award, in the award listing they described her artwork:

...the multidisciplinary artist’s work draws on her Pacific heritage, focusing on contemporary adornment and urban expressions of heritage and culture. (Creative New Zealand 2014)

Artists she has collaborated with include Shigeyuki Kihara, Patrice Kaikilekofe, kanak bamboo specialist Hervé Lecren, musician Natalia Mann and Pacific Sisters.

Te Papa, the national museum of New Zealand hold a number of To'omaga-Kaikilekofe's artworks in their collection. She had a piece in the exhibition Born to Excess (1999) with Shigeyuki Kihara's Teuanoaʻi.

In New Caledonia in 1999, To'omaga-Kaikilekofe along with Tyssia Gatuhau, Patrice Kaikilekofe, Paula Gony Boi, Micheline Neporon, Yvette Bouquet, Denise Tiavouane, Steeve Thomo, Marie Tamole, Alexi Fisi'ipeau founded the Société Itinérante d’Artistes du Pacifique et d’Océanie (Siapo Association NC) as a 'support network for Pacific Island artists in New Caledonia.' In 2016 To'omaga-Kaikilekofe was the president of the association and they held an exhibition called Women painters of Oceania. It featured three Kanak artists, Micheline Néporon, Denise Tiavouane and Paula Boi Gony.

We live in small communities, we need to better understand each other and support each other in the development of our region, our traditional and contemporary art. (Ela To'omaga-Kaikilekofe 2016)

== Commissions ==
- 1995 - Adorn to Excess exhibition (1999) - body adornment made of copper wire that (in conjunction with Shigeyuki Kihara's Teuanoaʻi)
- 2014 - Journey de la femmes - commemoration of International Women's Day for Secrétiat de la Communaute du Pacifique, Ans Vata, Nouméa Nouvelle Caledonie

== Awards ==
Creative New Zealand Arts Pasifika Awards (2014) - Special Recognition Award
