= Rosanna Raymond =

New Zealand artist (born 1967)

Rosanna Raymond MNZM
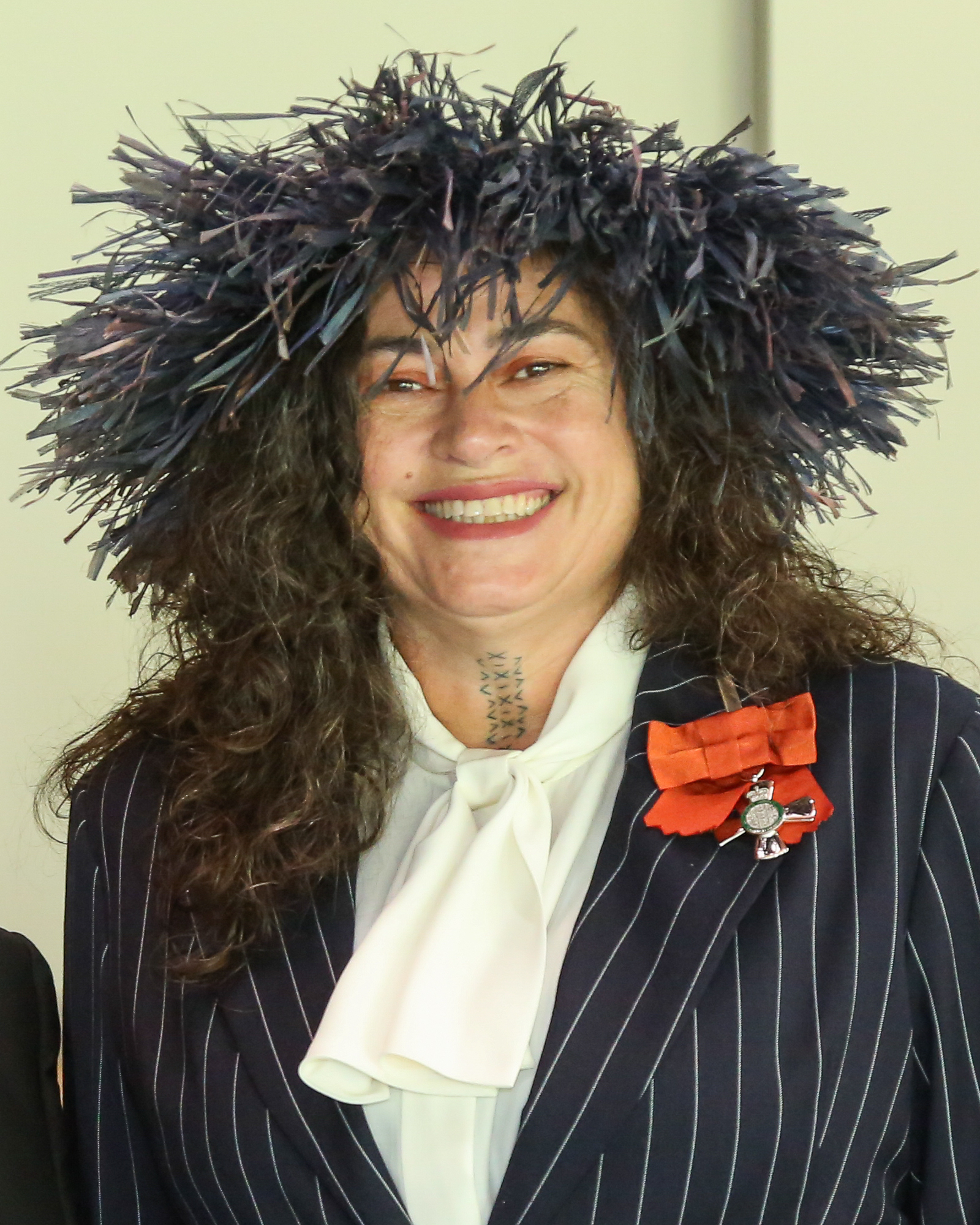
- Raymond in 2023
- Born: 1967 (age 58–59); Auckland, New Zealand
- Awards: Creative New Zealand Senior Pacific Artist award (2018)

Rosanna Marie Raymond MNZM (born 1967) is a New Zealand artist, poet, and cultural commentator. Raymond was recognised for "Pasifika artists practicing contemporary and heritage art forms in Aotearoa," winning the Senior Pacific Artist Award Winner of 2018, at the Arts Pasifika Awards through Creative New Zealand. Raymond is a member of the Pacific and Māori collective, Pacific Sisters.

== Background ==
Raymond was born 1967 in Auckland, New Zealand. A New Zealand born third generation Moana of Samoan, Tuvaluan, Irish and French descent.

== Career ==
Raymond began her career as a model in 1980s Christchurch. Raymond would be featured on the covers of ChaCha and Fashion Quarterly. She would later work as a stylist.

In 2008, with Amiria Manutahi Salmond, Raymond published Pasifika Styles: Artists Inside the Museum.

In 2010 Raymond launched the SaVAge K’lub project at the Queensland Art Gallery. The project in an installation space that has hosted artworks, spoken word, and performance art from over twenty five artists, including Ani O'Neill, Grace Taylor, and Suzanne Tamaki. SaVAge K’lub is in reference to an establishment in London a historical ninetieth century gentleman's club. Despite the cultural stereotypes and decor of such exclusive institutions Raymonds version removes the gendered and elitist elements. Evolving into a multidisciplinary platform that collects individuals Ideas, practices and knowledge that engenders "Raymond's central kaupapa: to bring about the non-cannabilistic cognitive consumption of 'the Other and opened discussion of space."

Raymond is an honorary research associate at the Department of Anthropology and Institute of Archaeology at University College London. In 2017 she gave the Peter Turner Memorial Lecture at Massey University.

Raymond also works as an exhibition curator. In 2016 she curated Ata Te Tangata, an exhibition of photography by Māori and Pacific artists that toured to China. In 2018 Raymond curated the annual Tautai tertiary exhibition.

At the Arts Pasifika Awards in 2018 Raymond was awarded the Senior Pacific Artist Award.

She completed a master's degree at Auckland University of Technology in 2021 with a thesis titled "C o n s e r . V Ā . t i o n | A c t i . V Ā . t i o n Museums, the body and Indigenous Moana art practice".

In the 2023 New Year Honours, Raymond was appointed a Member of the New Zealand Order of Merit, for services to Pacific art.

Works by Raymond are held in the collection of the Museum of New Zealand Te Papa Tongarewa and the Auckland Art Gallery Toi o Tāmaki.

== Personal life ==
In the 1980s she was married to fashion photographer Kerry Brown.

== Artist residencies ==
- 2005 – The Center for Pacific Islands Studies Visiting Artist Program- University of Hawaii, Honolulu
- 2006 – Sansburry centre for Visual Arts (SCVA)
- 2008 – de Young Museum San Francisco
- 2014 – Ethnological Museum Berlin
- 2017 – Matairangi Mahi Toi Artist Residency at Government House – Massey University College of Creative Arts Toi Rauwhārangi
