= Arts Pasifika Awards =

New Zealand arts award

Arts Pasifka Awards
- Date: Since 1996
- Country: New Zealand
- Hosted by: Creative New Zealand
- Website: Official website

The Arts Pasifika Awards celebrate excellence in Pacific arts in New Zealand. The annual awards are administered by Creative New Zealand and are the only national awards for Pasifika artists across all art forms.

The Arts Pasifika Awards include the awards for: Emerging Pacific Artist; Iosefa Enari Memorial Award; Pacific Heritage Art Award (from 2004); Contemporary Pacific Art Award; Senior Pacific Artist Award; Special Recognition Award (from 2013); and Pacific Toa Artist Award (from 2019).

== List of award recipients ==
=== Emerging Pacific Artist ===
- 2002 Peter Panoa
- 2003 Shigeyuki Kihara
- 2004 Lonnie Hutchinson
- 2005 Mīria George
- 2006 Tusiata Avia
- 2007 WakaUra Dance Group
- 2008 Tuāfale Tanoa’i AKA Linda T.
- 2009 Poulima Salima
- 2010 Visesio Siasau
- 2011 Kulimoe'anga 'Stone' Maka
- 2012 Justin Haiu
- 2013 Suli Moa
- 2014 Grace Taylor
- 2015 Ane Tonga
- 2016 Anonymouz (Matthew Faiumu Salapu)
- 2017 Tupua Tigafua
- 2018 Leki Jackson Bourke
- 2019 Tyla Veau
- 2020 Pati Solomona Tyrell
- 2021 Vivian Aue
- 2022 Dahlia Malaeulu
- 2023 David Feauai-Afaese
- 2024 Sione Monū
- 2025 Haanz Fa’avae-Jackson
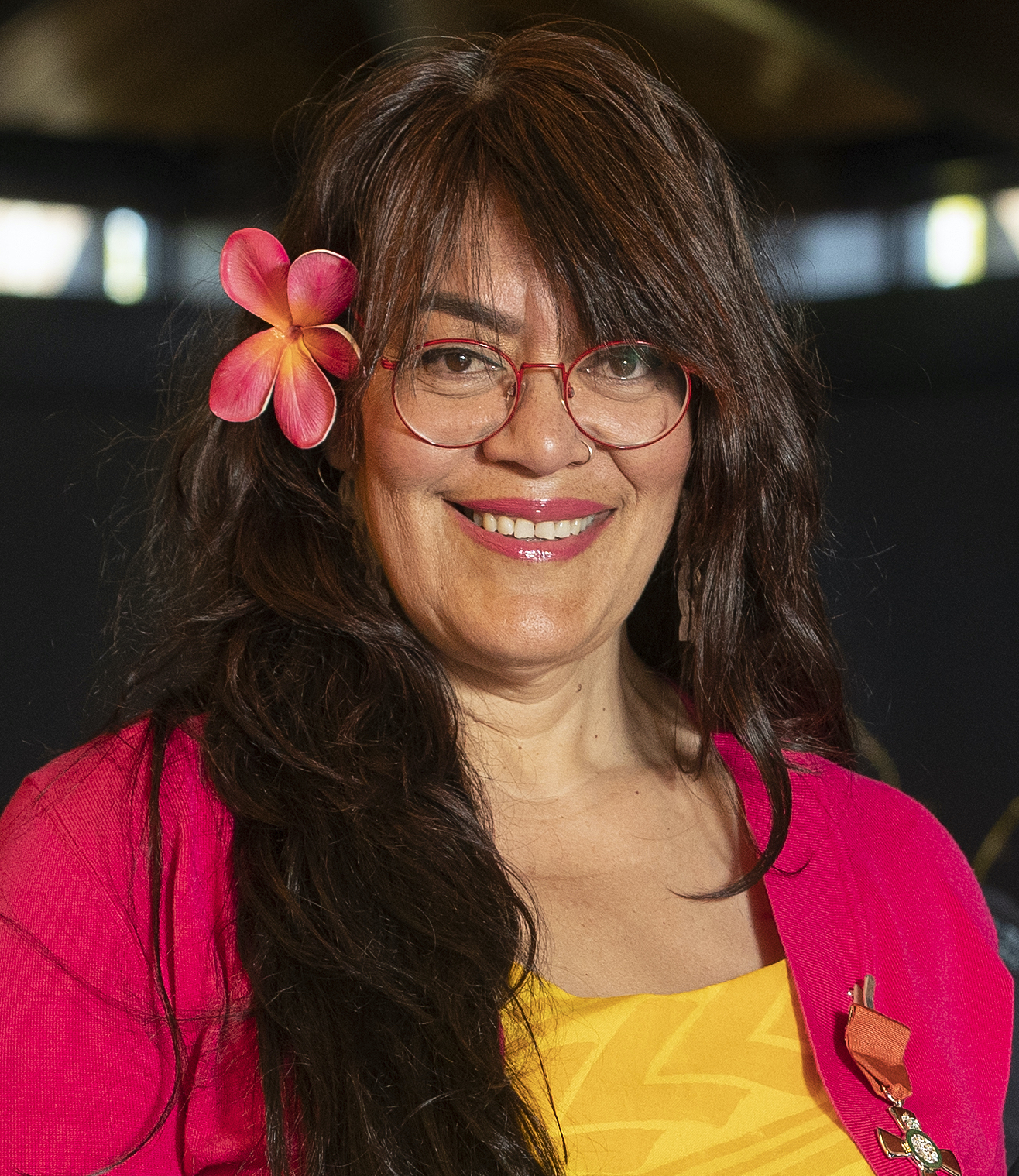
Tusiata Avia MNZM

=== Iosefa Enari Memorial Award ===
- 2002 Ben Makisi
- 2003 Daphne Collins
- 2004 Bonadventure Allan-Moetaua
- 2005 Ramonda Taleni
- 2006 Aivale Cole
- 2007 Sani Muamaseali’i
- 2008 James Ioelu
- 2009 Elisha Na’otala Fa’I
- 2010 Pene Junior Pati
- 2011 Marlena Devoe
- 2012 Isabella Moore
- 2013 Natalia Mann
- 2014 No award given
- 2015 Manase Tapuaki Mei Langi Latu
- 2016 Madison Nonoa
- 2017 Filipe Manu
- 2018 Benson Wilson
- 2019 Samson Setu
- 2020 Moses Mackay
- 2021 Ridge Ponini
- 2022 Joshua Pearson
- 2023 Hayden Afele-Nickel
- 2024 Emmanuel Fonoti-Fuimaono
- 2025 Alfred Fonoti-Fuimaono
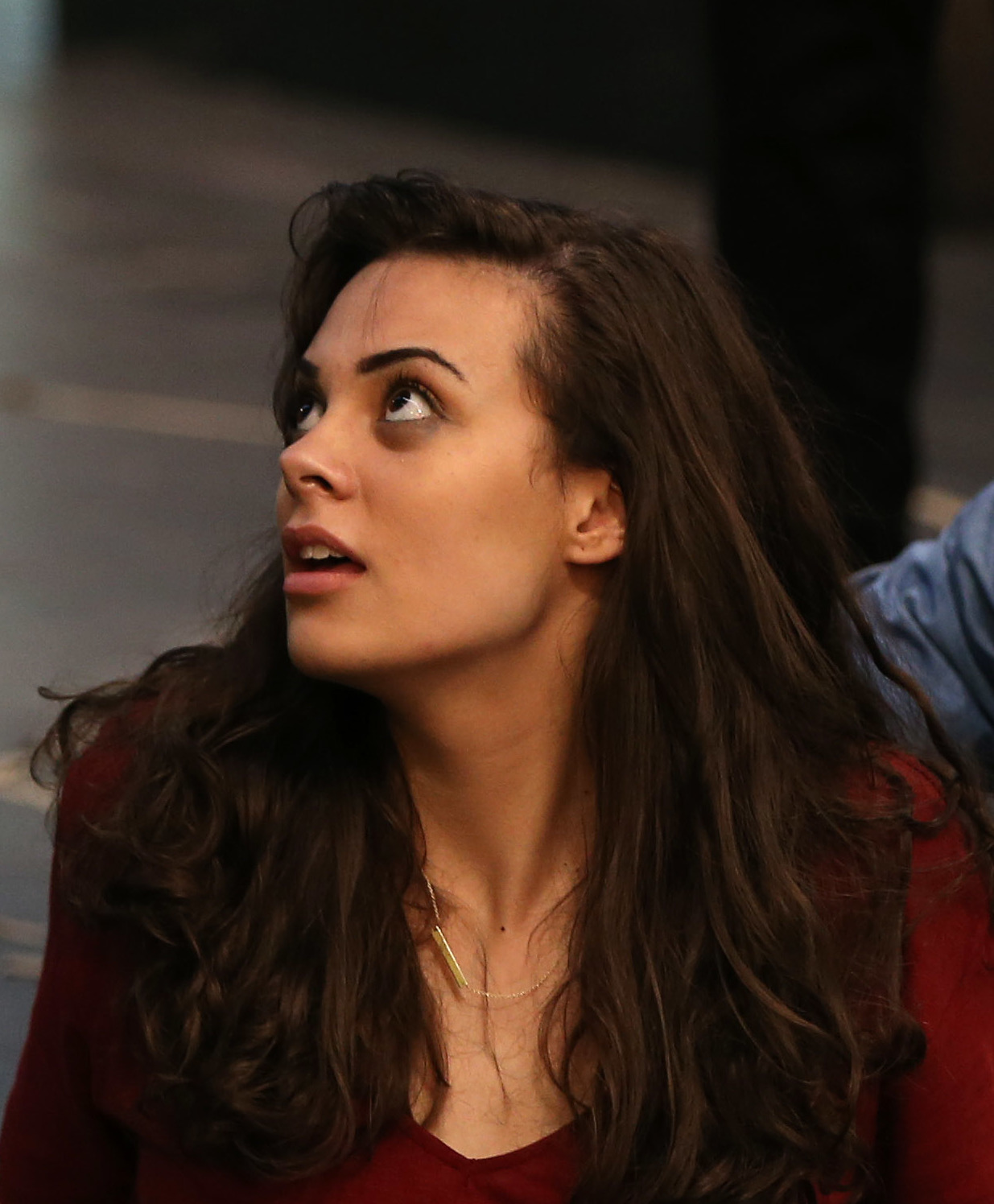
Madison Nonoa (2016)

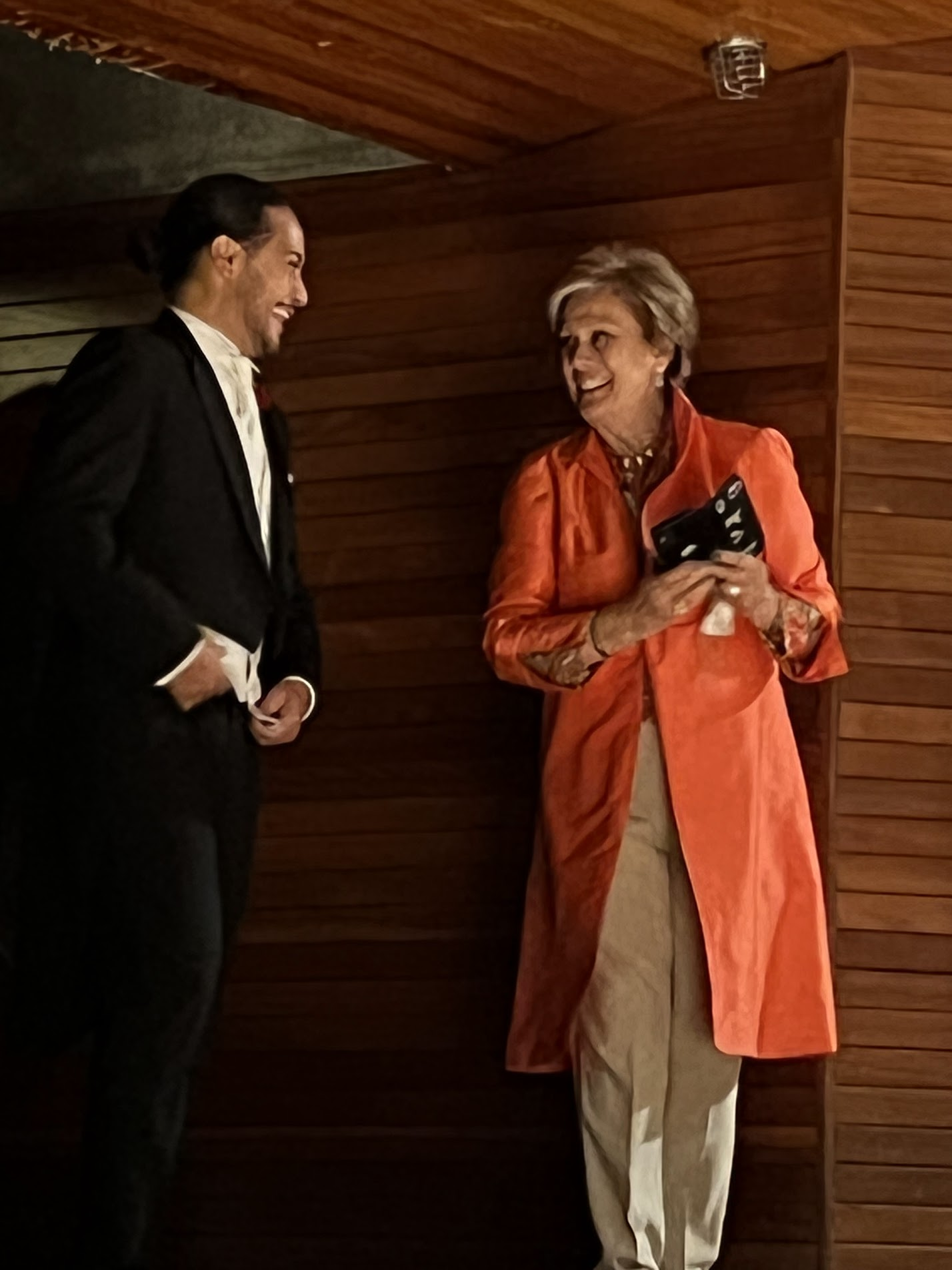
Filipe Manu (2017) and Kiri Te Kanawa

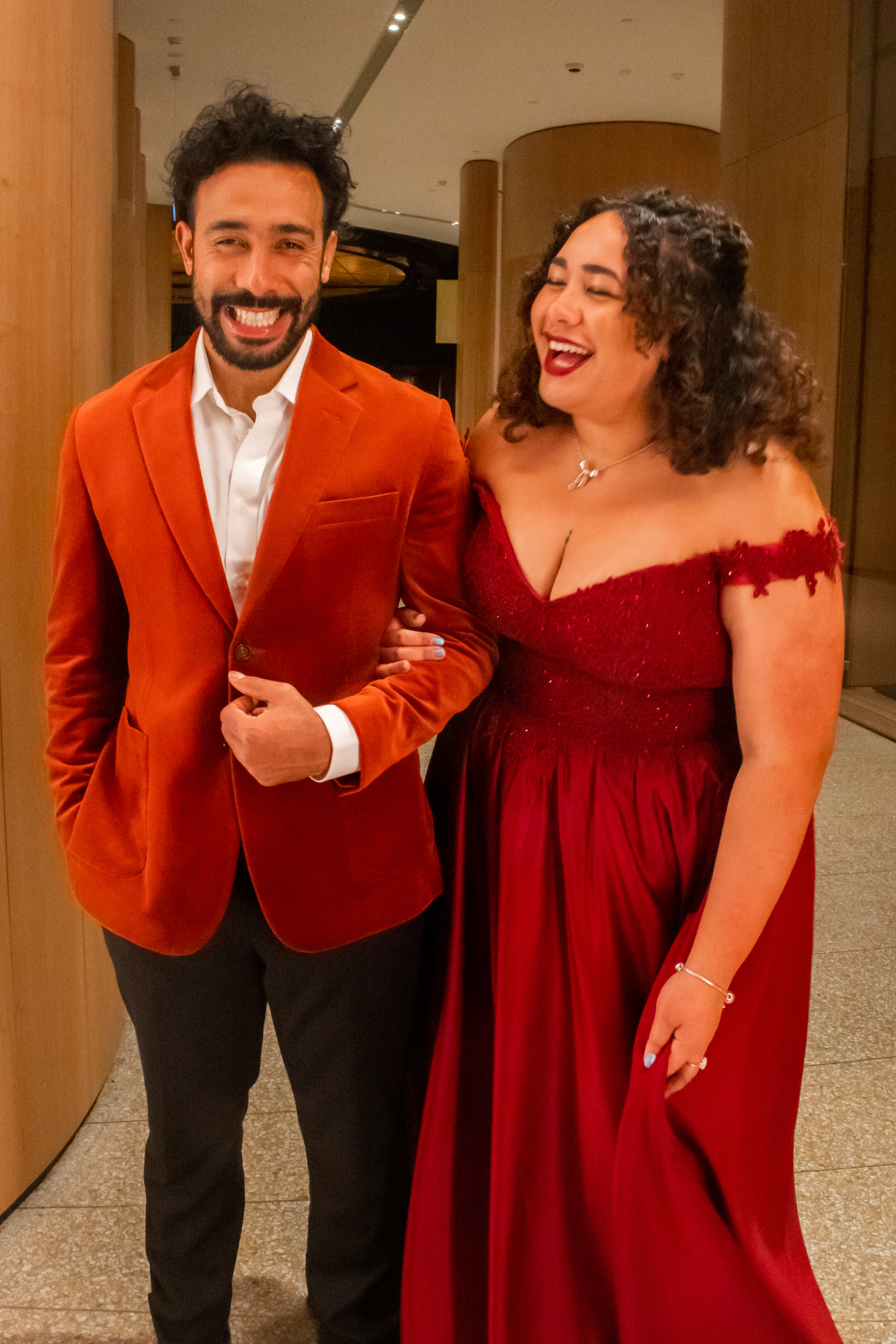
Moses Mckay (2020) and his sister Anasetasia

=== Pacific Heritage Art Award ===
This award began in 2004.

- 2004 Kepueli Vaomotou
- 2005 Mafi Malaga III
- 2006 Tau Fuata Niue
- 2007 Dr. Okusi Mahina
- 2008 Enuamanu Maruarua Atiu Society
- 2009 Falepipi he Mafola
- 2010 Kalameli Ihaia-Alefosio
- 2010 O Mata! Tokelau Dance Group
- 2011 Mary Ama and the Pacifica Mamas
- 2012 Atafu Tokelau Community Group
- 2013 Ioane Aleke Fa’avae
- 2014 Sinakiteu Women Development Group
- 2015 Joana Monolagi
- 2016 Tuaine-Nurse Tamarua Robati
- 2017 Lakiloko Keakea
- 2018 Sulieti Fieme'a Burrows & Tui Emma Gillies
- 2019 Louisa Humphry & Kaetaeta Watson
- 2020 Cora-Allan Wickliffe
- 2021 Tupumaiaga A Niue Trust
- 2022 Daren Kamali
- 2023 Losalia Milika Pusiaki Fifita
- 2024 Signature Choir
- 2025 The Veiqia Project
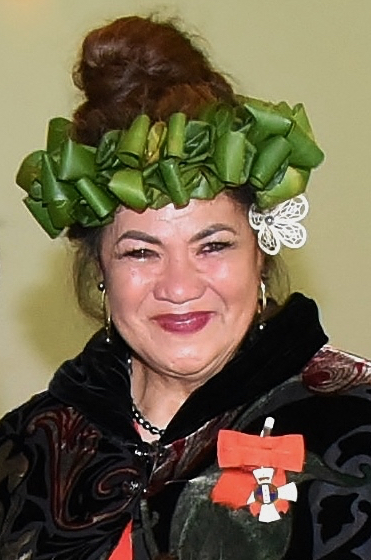
Mary Ama CNZM

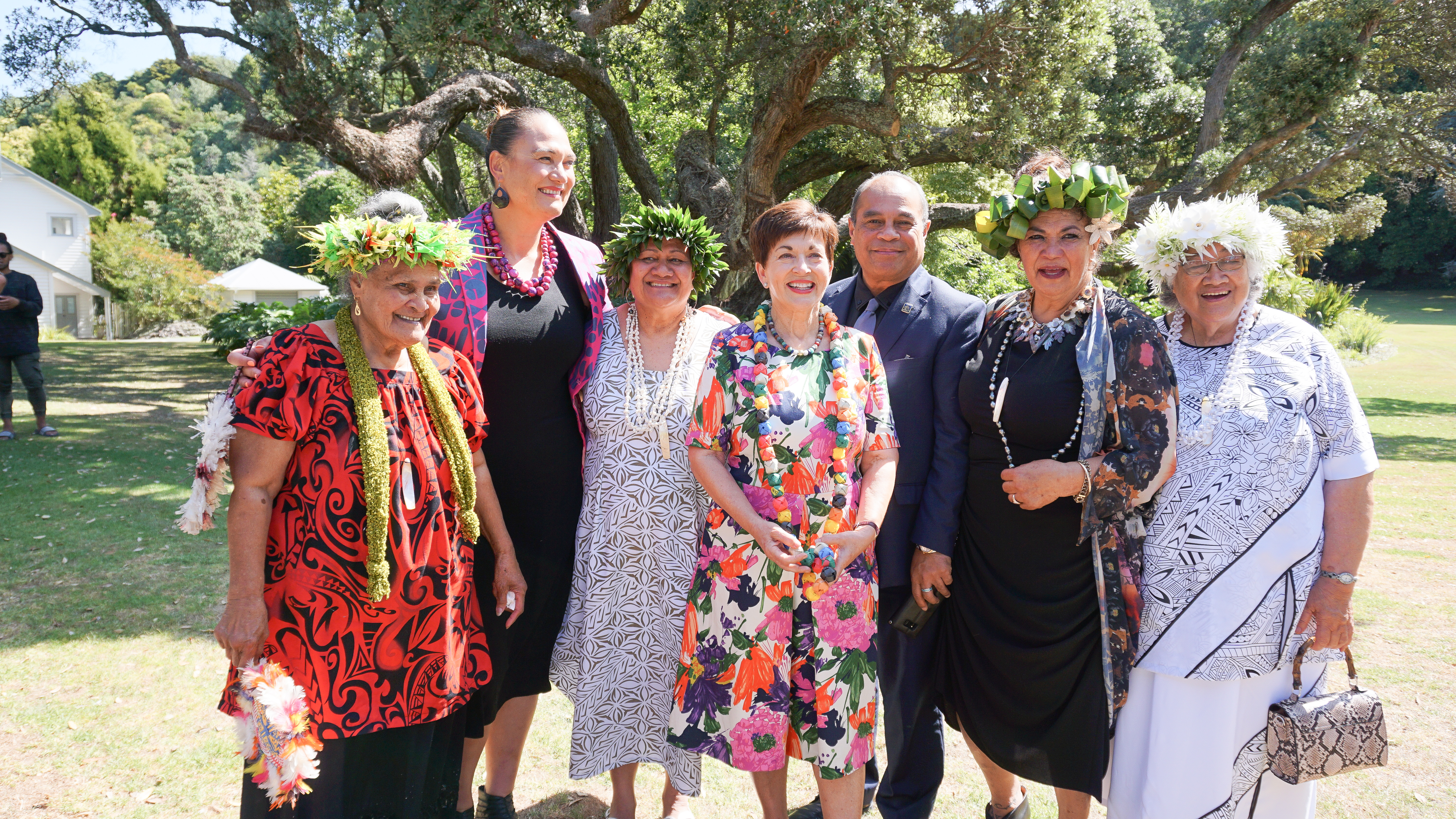
Pacifica Mamas & dignitaries

=== Contemporary Pacific Art Award ===
- 2002 Richard Shortland-Cooper
- 2003 Filipe Tohi
- 2004 Lemi Ponifasio (MAU Dance)
- 2005 John Ioane
- 2006 Sima Urale
- 2007 Nina Nawalowalo
- 2008 Dianna Fuemana
- 2009 Shigeyuki Kihara
- 2010 Michel Tuffery
- 2011 Janet Lilo
- 2012 Ema Tavola
- 2013 Victor Rodger
- 2014 Dagmar Dyck
- 2015 Lonnie Hutchinson
- 2016 Karlo Mila
- 2017 Kalisolaite 'Uhila
- 2018 Angela Tiatia
- 2019 Anapela Polataivao
- 2020 Tanu Gago
- 2021 Tupe Lualua
- 2022 Kulimoe'anga 'Stone' Maka
- 2023 Katrina Iosia
- 2024 Edith Amituana’i
- 2025 Sofia Tekela-Smith
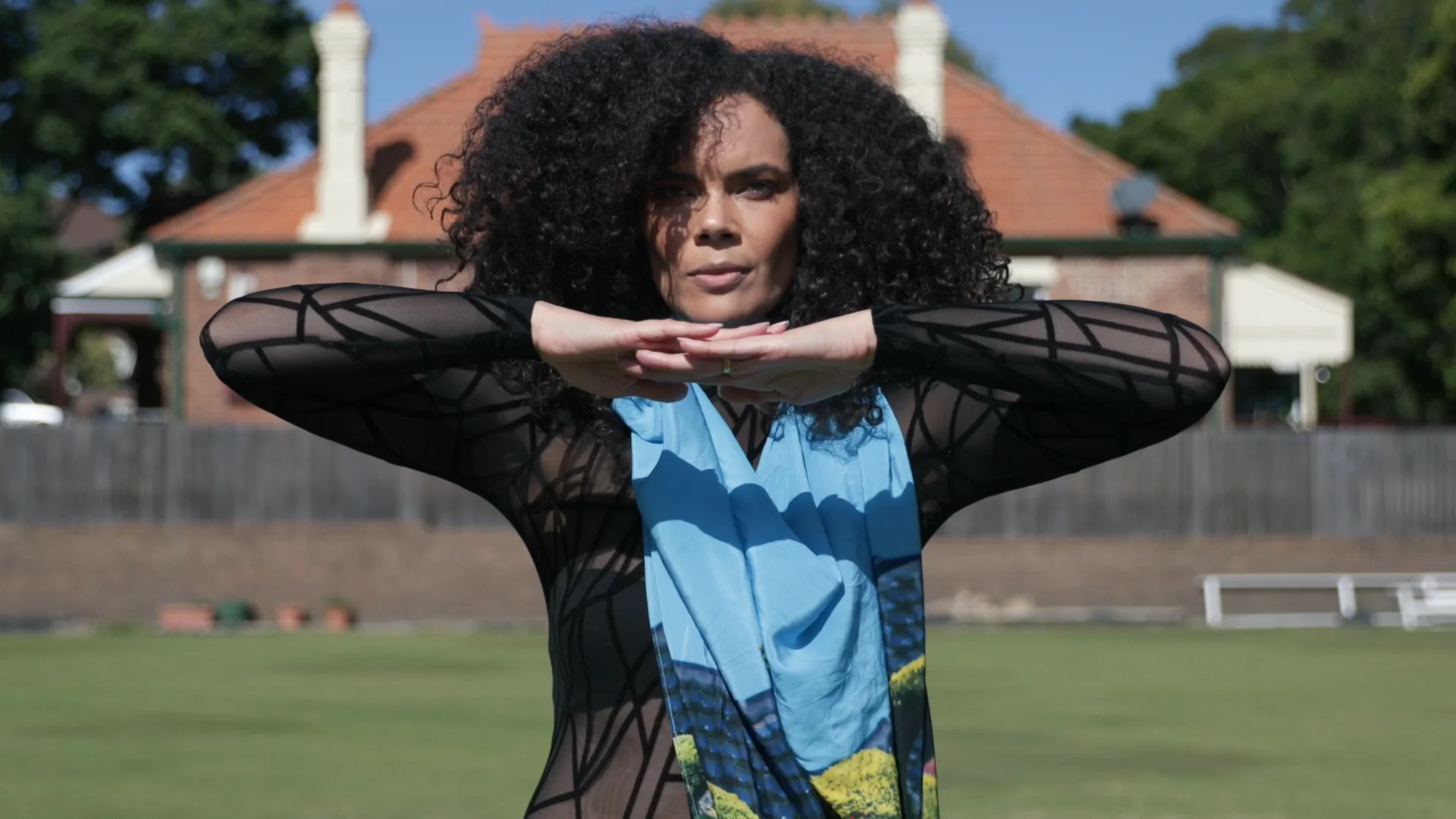
Angela Tiatia

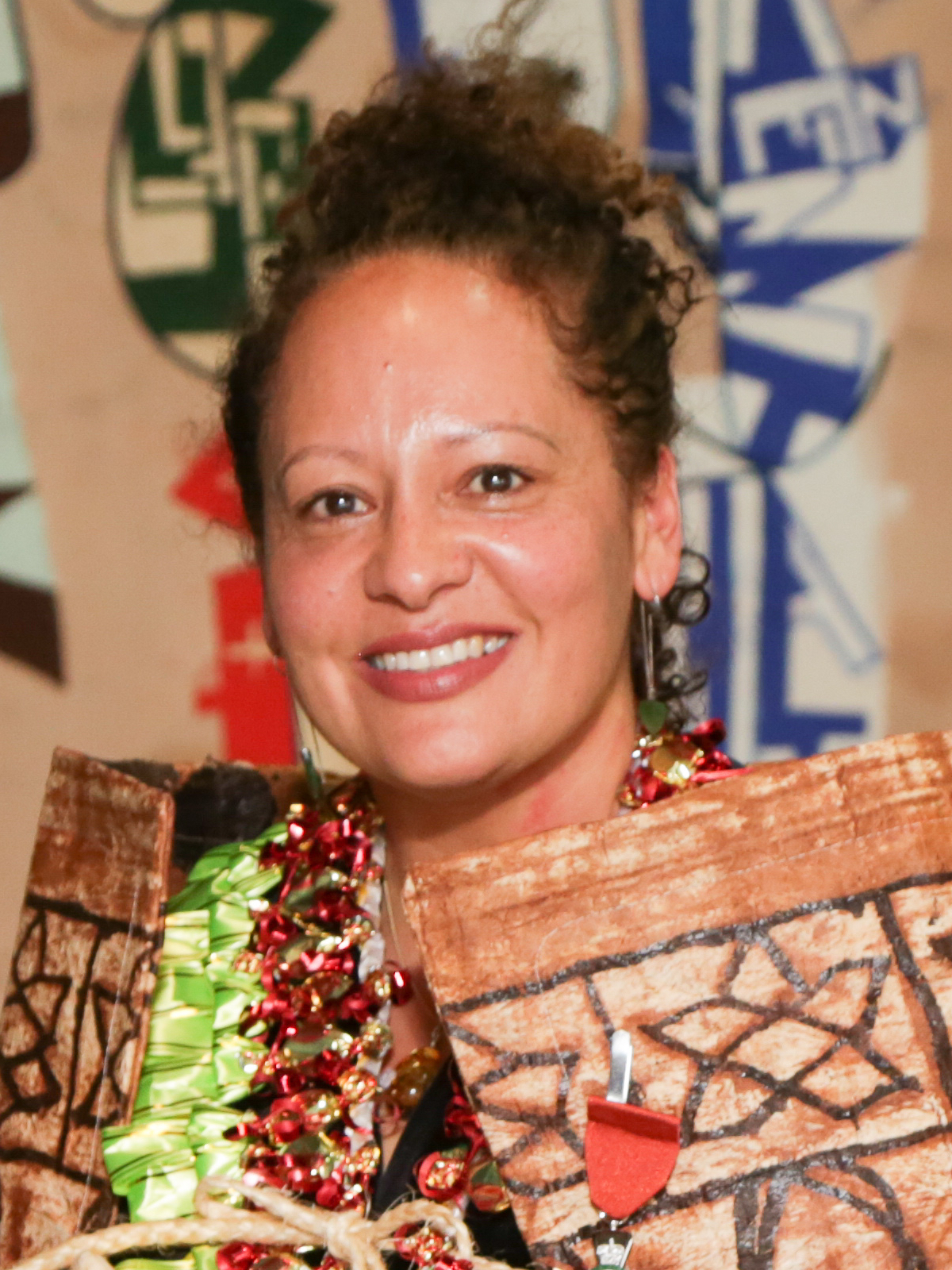
Karlo Mila MNZM

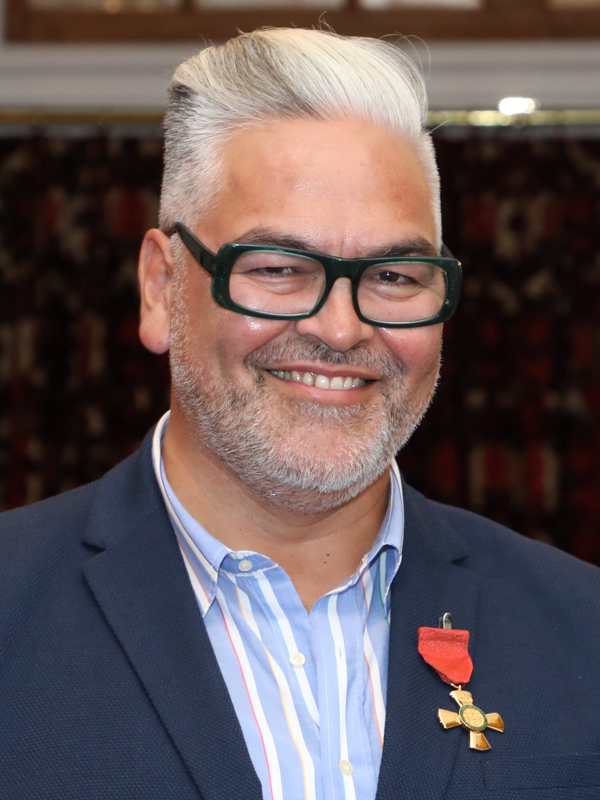
Victor Rodger ONZM

=== Senior Pacific Artist Award ===
- 2002 Johnny Penisula
- 2003 Albert Wendt
- 2004 Nathaniel Lees
- 2005 Opetaia Foa’ai (Te Vaka)
- 2006 Jim Vivieaere
- 2007 Justine Simei-Barton
- 2008 Igelese Ete
- 2009 Sopolemalama Filipe Tohi
- 2010 Misa Emma Kesha
- 2011 Annie Crummer
- 2012 Lemi Ponifasio
- 2013 Jonathan Lemalu
- 2014 Steve Ma Ching
- 2015 Neil Ieremia
- 2016 Dave Fane & Oscar Kightley
- 2017 Nina Nawalowalo
- 2018 Rosanna Raymond
- 2019 Eteuati Ete
- 2020 Michel Tuffery
- 2021 Andy Leleisi'uao
- 2022 Fatu Feu’u
- 2023 Ani O'Neill (Ngāti Makea, Ngāti Te Tika)
- 2023 Lonnie Hutchinson (Ngāi Tahu, Samoan, Celtic)
- 2024 Tusiata Avia
- 2025 Anapela Polataivao
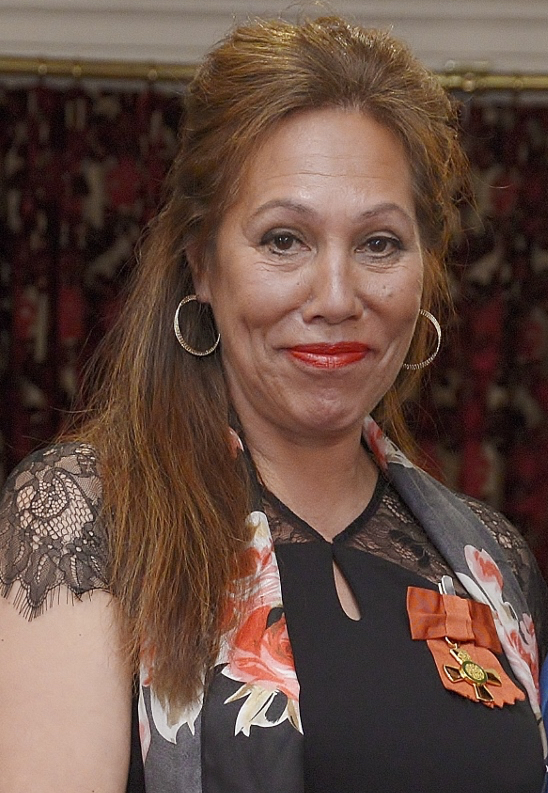
Nina Nawalowalo ONZM

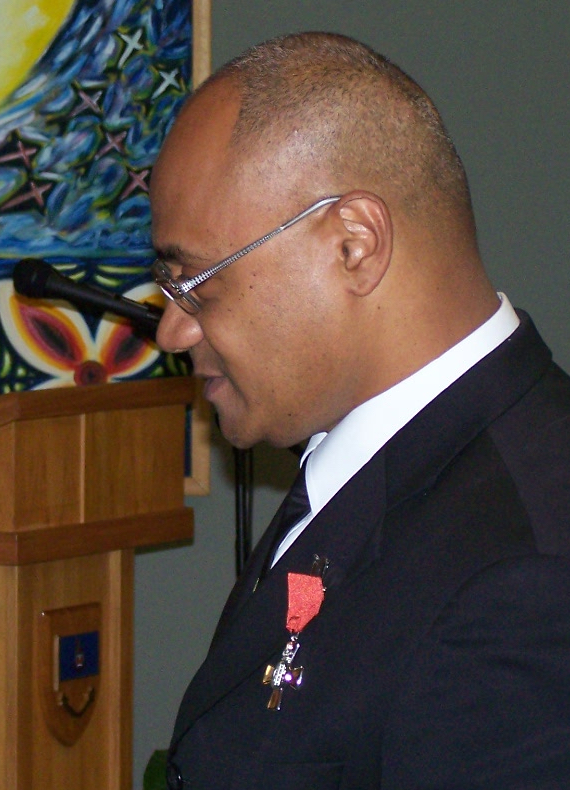
Oscar Kightley MNZM

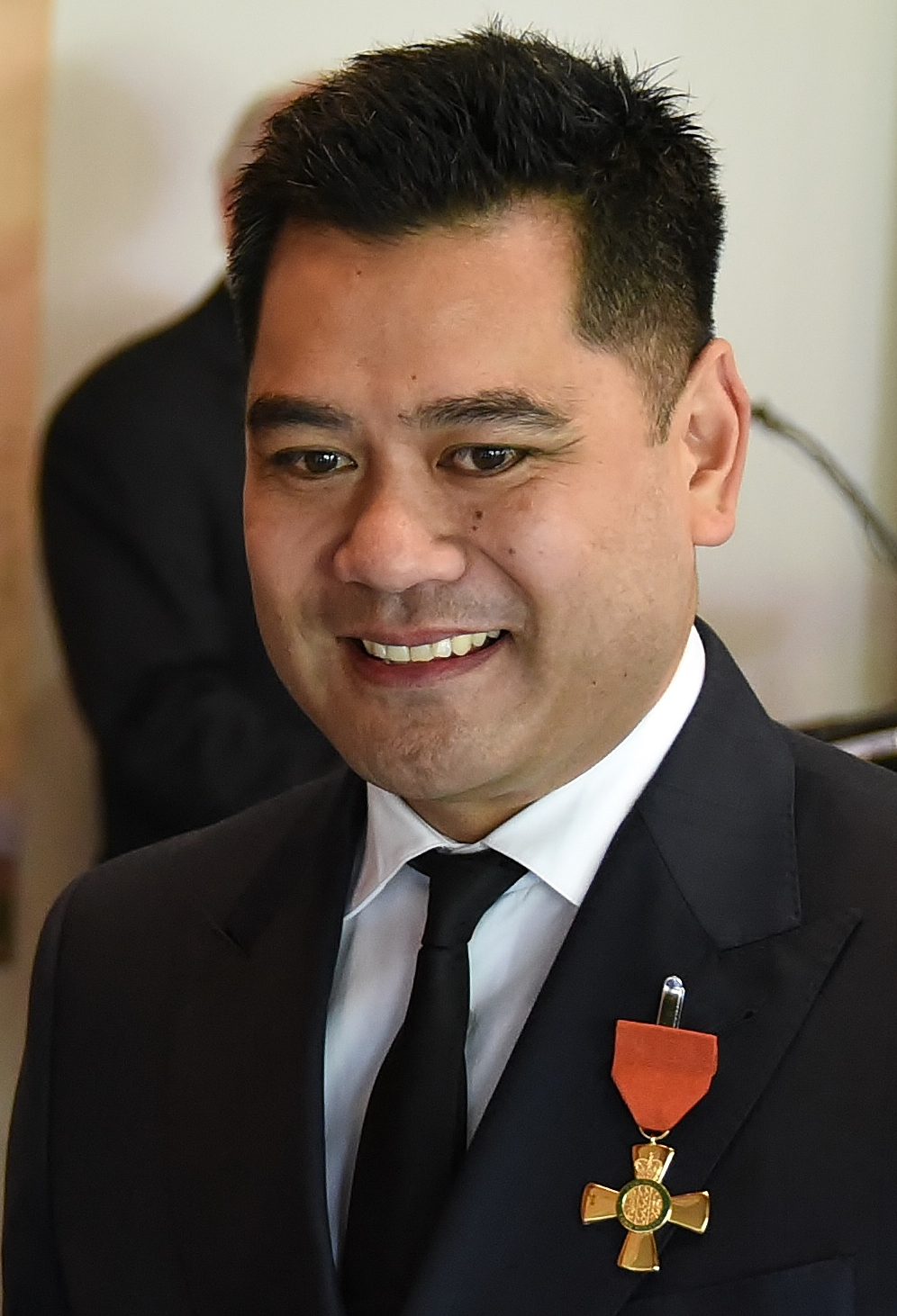
Neil Ieremia ONZM

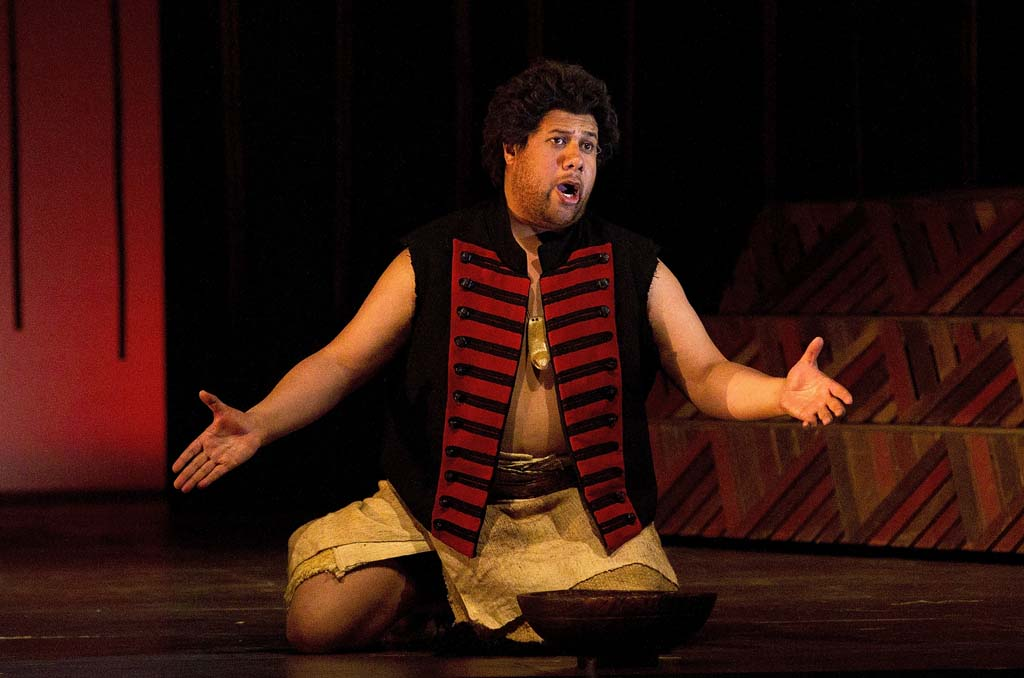
Jonathan Lemalu

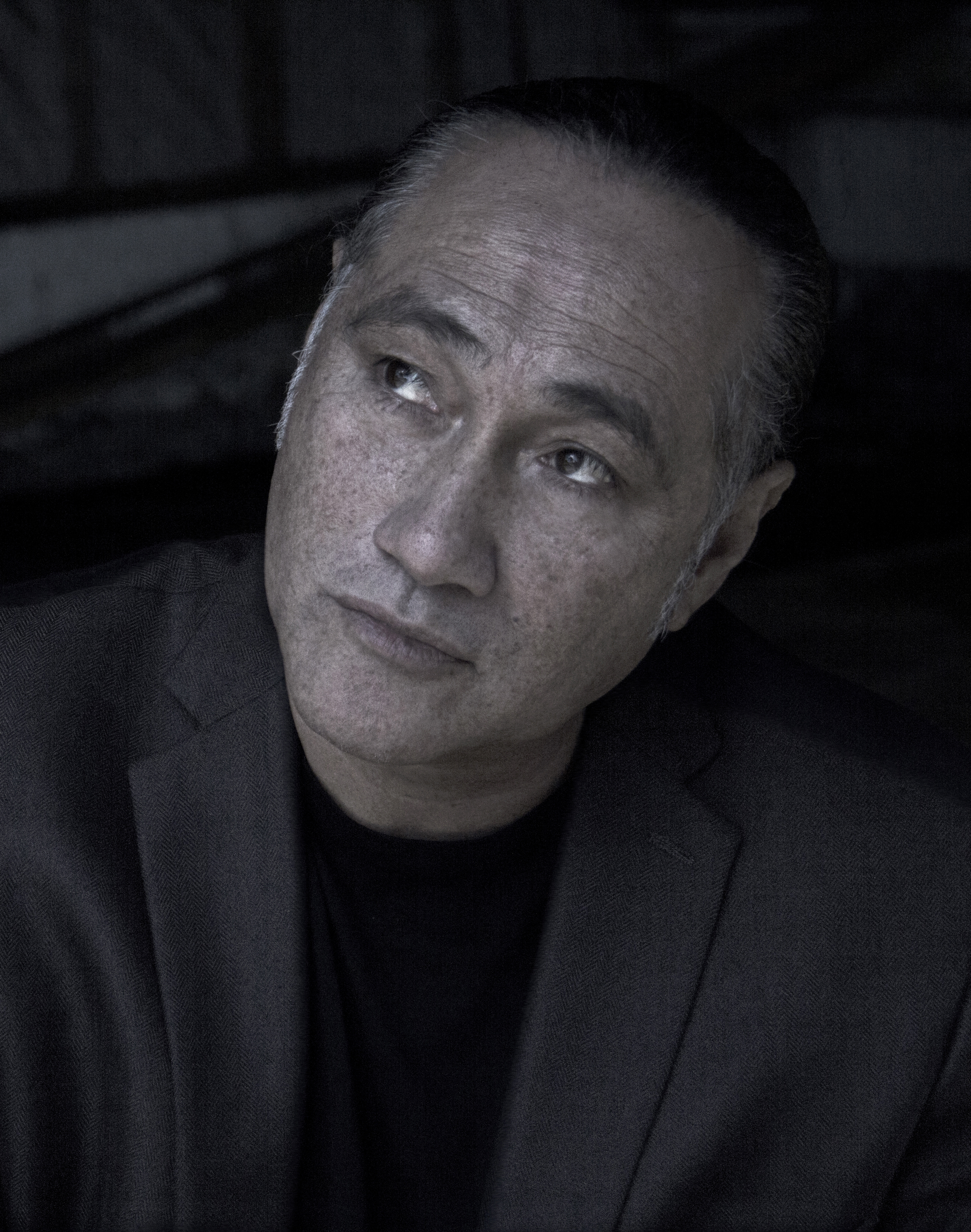
Lemi Ponifasio

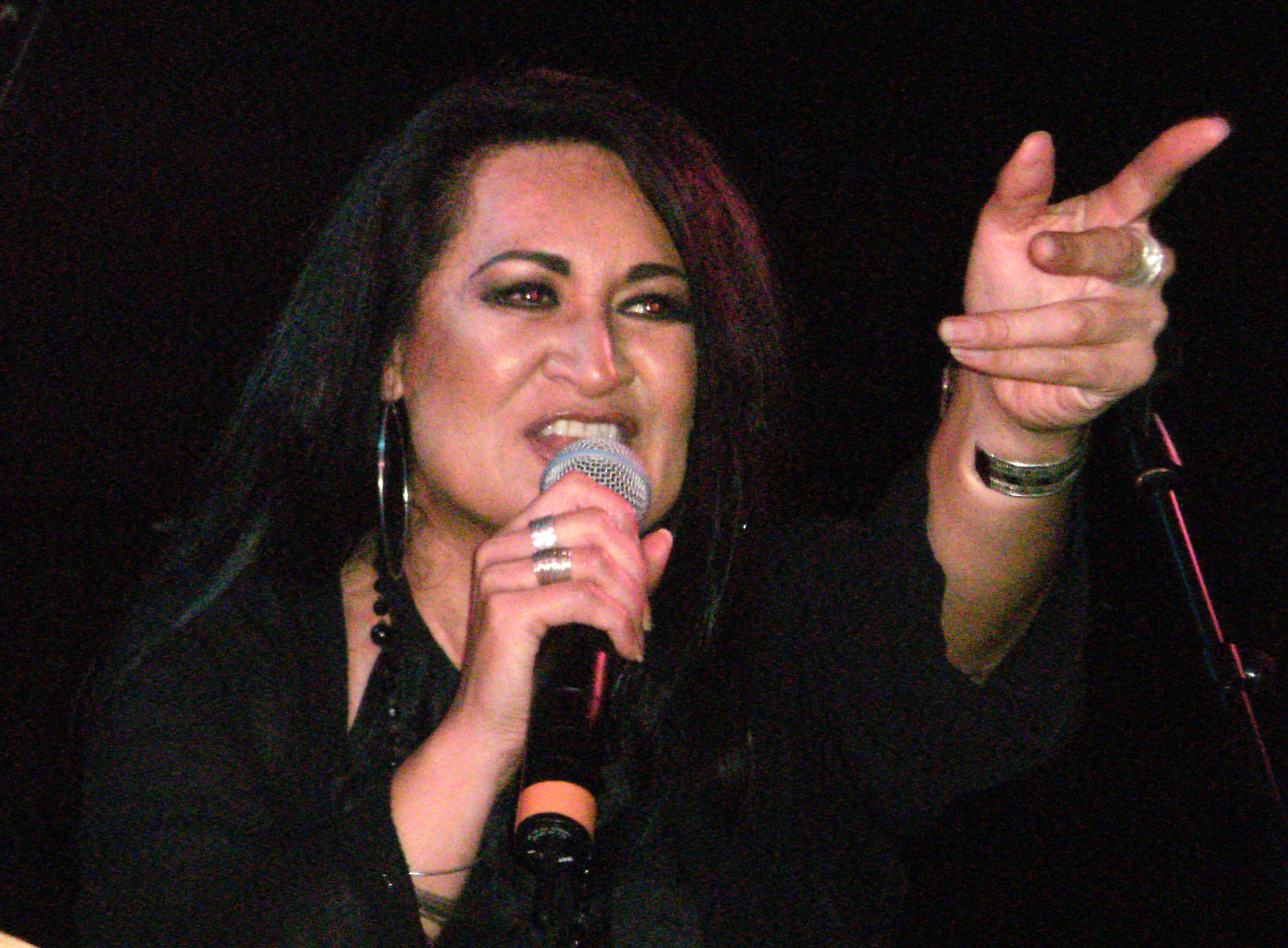
Annie Crummer

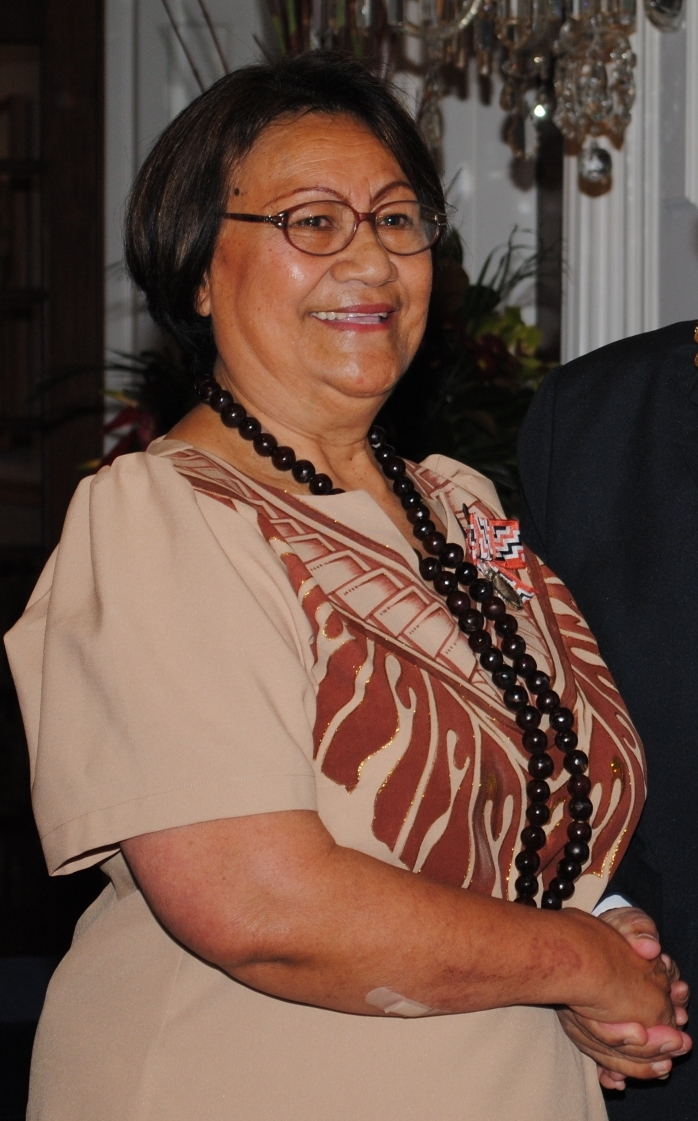
Misa Emma Kesha

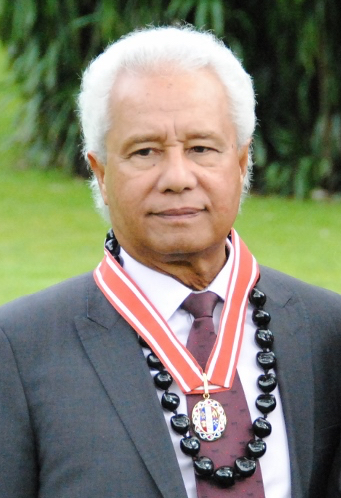
Albert Wendt ONZ

=== Special Recognition Award ===
This award began in 2013 to "recognise special contribution to the standing, and standard, of Pacific arts in Aotearoa and/or internationally".

- 2013 Parris Goebel
- 2013 Sean Mallon
- 2014 Ela To'omaga-Kaikilekofe
- 2015 Lisa Taouma
- 2016 Kolokesa U. Māhina-Tuai
- 2017 Noma Sio-Faiumu
- 2018 Iosefa Enari
- 2019 Glenda Tuaine
- 2020 Tanya Muagututi'a
- 2021 Lindah Lepou
- 2022 Fa'amoana Luafutu
- 2022 Troy Tu’ua
- 2023 Falepipi he Mafola Niuean Handcraft Inc
- 2024 Leafa Wilson
- 2025 Seiuli Terri Leo-Mauu
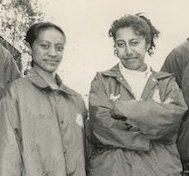
Tanya Muagututi'a (right) with long time collaborator Erolia Ifopo in 1994

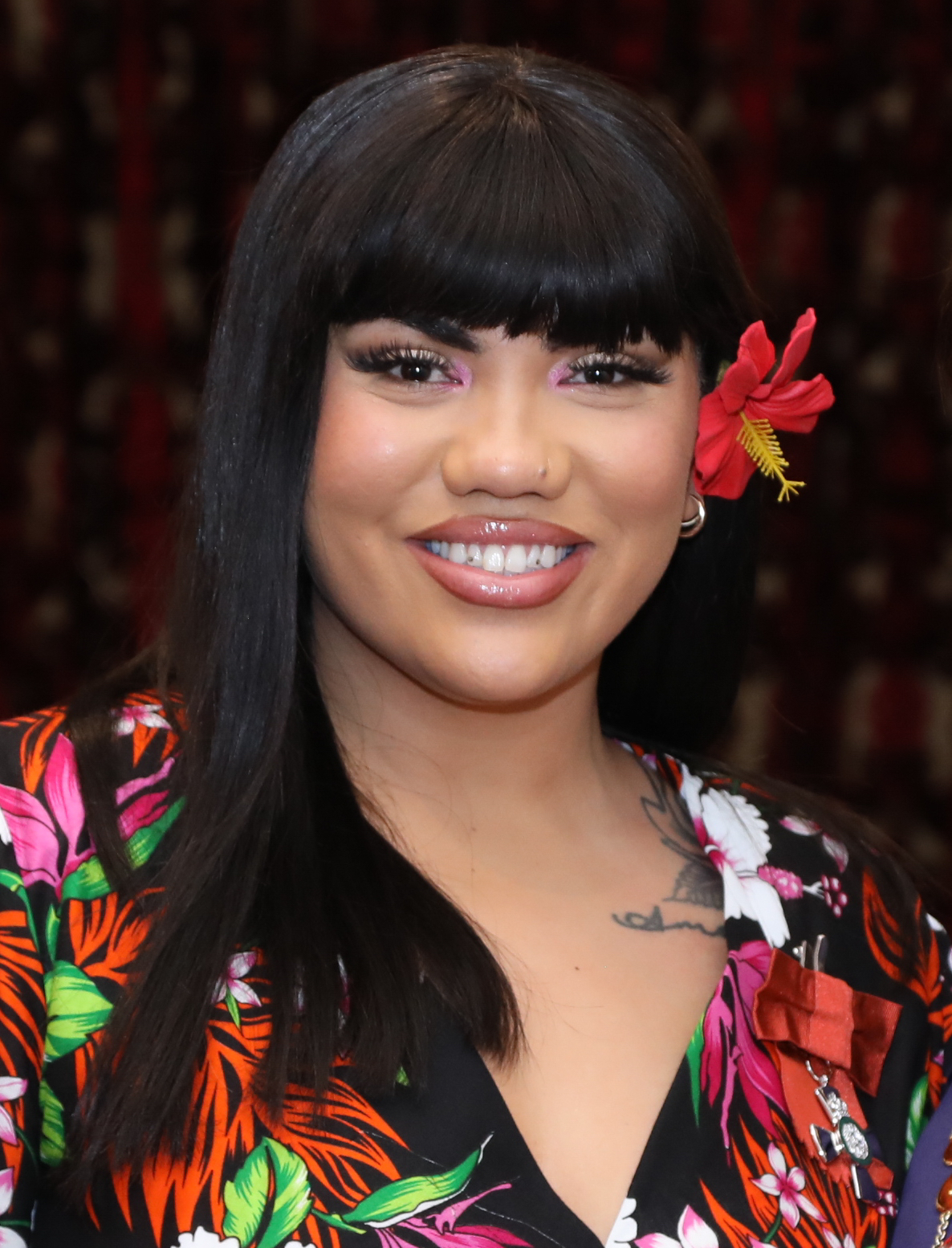
Parris Goebel MNZM

=== Pacific Toa Artist Award ===
This award commenced in 2019. It acknowledges the "contribution of a Pasifika artist with the lived experience of disability to the standing, and standard, of Pacific arts nationally or globally".

- 2019 Pati Umaga
- 2020 Pelenakeke Brown and Lusi Faiva
- 2021 Ronnie Tua
- 2022 Ululau Ama
- 2023 Lavinia Lovo
- 2024 Max Stowers and Falefatu Carreras Enari
- 2025 Tejit Records
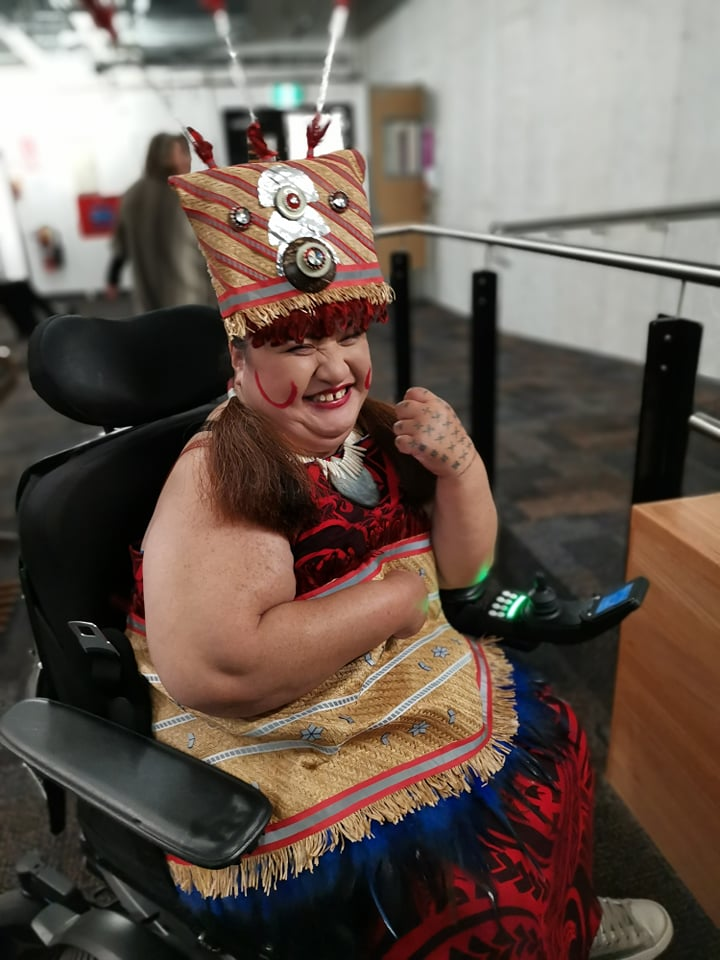
Lusi Faiva

== Pacific Arts Business Award ==
* 2025 The Coconet / tikilounge Productions Ltd
