= Lindah Lepou =

New Zealand-Samoan fashion designer

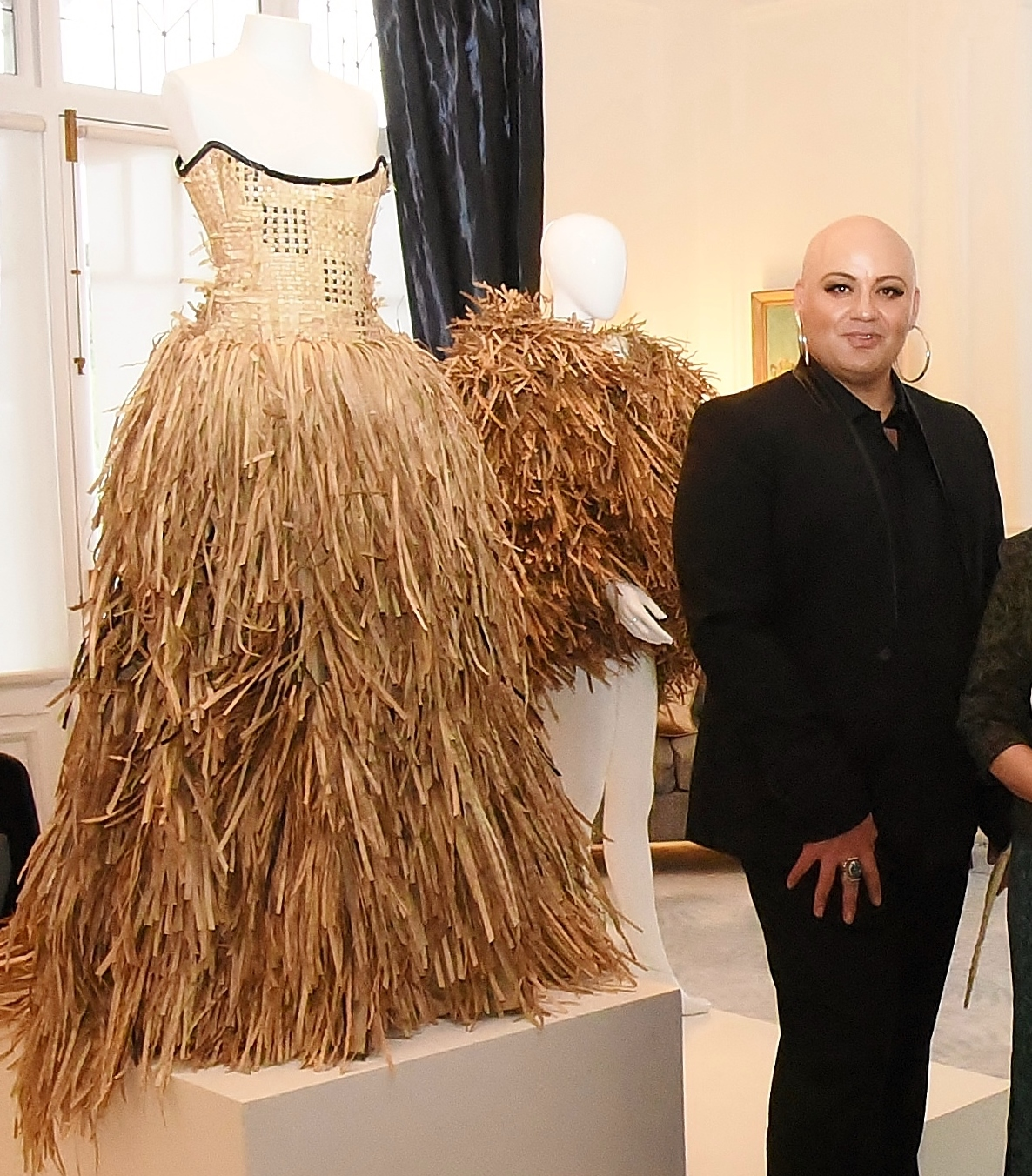
Lepou next to an early work in 2017

Lindah Aaron Lepou is a New Zealand-Samoan fashion designer. Her work is included in the permanent collection of Museum of New Zealand Te Papa Tongarewa.

== Early life ==
Lepou was born in Wellington and lived in Cannons Creek, Porirua until she was nine. She then moved to Samoa. When she was 15, she won a scholarship to Brigham Young University–Hawaii, however she only studied there for three months before returning to Samoa.

Lepou won a beauty pageant, with the prize of a trip to New Zealand, and moved to Auckland. In 1994 she entered her first fashion competition, the Benson & Hedges Awards; she entered a flax tutu, which the organisers placed in the Avant Garde category, however the following year the competition opened a Pacific Influences category for entries such as hers.

== Career ==
In 2005, Lepou was the supreme winner of the Style Pasifika Fashion Awards.

In 2015, Lepou worked with choreographer Neil Ieremia to design costumes for SIVA, a show marking the 20th anniversary of Black Grace Dance Company. In 2017, Lepou was the Matairangi Mahi Toi Pasifika artist in residence at Government House, Wellington.

Lepou's work features traditional Samoan materials and skills such as tapa cloth and pandanus leaves.

Lepou won the Special Recognition Award at the 2021 Arts Pasifika Awards.
