= Natalia Mann =

New Zealand harpist

- Born: Wellington
- Genres: classical, jazz, conceptual music
- Occupation(s): musician, composer
- Instrument: Harp

Natalia Lagi'itaua Mann is an international harpist and musician, born in Wellington, New Zealand. In 2013 she received the Iosefa Enari Memorial Award at the Arts Pasifika Awards. She has performed with the New Zealand Symphony Orchestra and collaborated with Richard Nunns. Her album Pasif.ist (2011) reached number 4 New Zealand album charts in its second week.

== Early life and education ==
Mann was born in Wellington and is of Samoan, Chinese, English and Scottish heritage. She started learning music as a child, learning piano and harp, starting with harp at age four.

Mann earned her Bachelor of Music from the Victorian College of the Arts in Melbourne in 2002. Her degree is in classical music performance, with Xanya Mamunya as her main teacher and influence from Alice Chalifoux. She has been mentored by Richard Nunns and Ros Bandt. Mann has also studied Jazz at Skopje University.

== Career ==
Mann started her professional music career in her late teens as a harpist including with the New Zealand Symphony Orchestra. Mann creates soundscapes and improvisations, and also plays jazz and classical music.

For ten years Mann lived in Melbourne, Australia. She co-founded the group Samoan trio Sunga, the Brown Roots Pacific Arts Collective, and the avant-garde group Shima. She lived in Istanbul for six years and in 2017 was based in Cairns, Australia. She has played jazz in Macedonia.

Mann has played harp with the New Zealand Symphony Orchestra and the Macedonian Philharmonic Orchestra.

She recorded on Unified Gecko – Gecko Kebab a collaboration between Australian musicians and the Turkish group Gece.

Her abstract and conceptual music collaborators include Richard Nunns, Ros Bandt, David Long, Erdem Helvacioglu and ethnomusicologist Robert Reigle.

She has made a documentary Illuminations on Consciousness about 'synaesthesia and collective consciousness in relation to art and nature'. In 2014 she exhibited lightscores for resonance music called Musique Concrète in Wellington.

In 2011 Mann and percussionist Izzet Kizil released an album Pasif.ist with Rattle Records. Other artists on the album are: Sercan Halili, Abdullah Shakar, Dine Doneff, Richard Nunns, Lucien Johnson, Riki Gooch, Serdar Pazarcıoglu, Deniz Gungur, and Naomi Jean O’Sullivan who was co-writer on the track "Time"). It reached number four on the New Zealand album charts in its second week.

Mann often plays harp for Bic Runga. In 2011 Mann was the opening act for Bic Runga's Acoustic Church Tour of New Zealand.

Mann collaborated with Neil Ieremia and Black Grace in 2011.

In 2017 the album Utterance was released with compositions created by Mann, David Long and Richard Nunns. The music is described as "improvised soundscapes" and was recorded in 2013. It was the last recording made by Richard Nunns before retirement due to his struggle with Parkinson's disease.

== Awards ==
- 2013 – Iosefa Enari Memorial Award, Arts Pasfika Awards, Creative New Zealand
