= Stone Maka =

Tongan artist

- Born: Kulimoe'anga Stone Maka; 1970 (age 55–56); Pātangata, Tonga
- Education: Whitecliffe College of Arts and Design
- Alma mater: Manukau Institute of Technology
- Known for: Painting Ngatu Tā 'Uli

Kulimoe'anga Stone Maka, is an interdisciplinary artist of Tongan heritage who lives in Christchurch, New Zealand. In 2011, he was awarded the Emerging Pasifika Artist Award from Creative New Zealand. Maka's work has been exhibited in museums and art galleries in New Zealand, Hawai'i Australia and Tonga. In 2020 he was selected to represent New Zealand at the 22nd Biennale in Sydney.

== Early life ==
Maka was born in Tonga, in the village of Pātangata and is the second youngest of 12 children. His father was a carpenter and his mother was a fisher and a Tapa maker. Maka and his family grew up with little financial resource, but was inspired from a young age to become a professional artist by his teacher, Professor Viliami Toluta'u and Ve'etūtū Pahulu (Composer, Tongan Poet and choreographer). Growing up in Tonga, Maka spent most of his time by the ocean, drawing and sketching. After completing his studies at Liahona High School in Tonga, Maka and his family migrated to Auckland, New Zealand, then later settled in Christchurch where his studio is based.

== Biography ==
From 1990 – 1996 Maka had exhibited murals in Tonga, Ha'apai prior to his arrival in New Zealand.

In 2001, Maka gained a certificate of Art and Design at the art school in Auckland, Whitecliffe College of Arts and Design. He continued his tertiary studies from 2002 – 2004, where he graduated with BA in Visual Art, at Manukau Institute of Technology, Auckland, with both qualifications majoring in painting. As part of Maka's research during his studies, he traveled back to Tonga to attain more knowledge surrounding the fundamental practice of Ngatu Tā 'Uli (Blackened Tapa Cloth), a cornerstone of his art practice.

In 2008, Maka received the Margaret Stoddart award for his work in the Festival of Flowers, along with a cash prize of $2000. This further propelled his success in the following year, where he was selected as the Pacific artist in Residence at the University of Canterbury, where he received studio space, financial stipends and resources. Alumni of this award include Tusiata Avia, David Fane, John Pule and Michel Tuffery.

Maka's art practice is heavily influenced and inspired from his Tongan heritage, where he incorporates a multitude of styles, including traditional Tongan art forms, from creating Ngatu (Tapa) made from the bark of the Mulberry tree, combining contemporary and experimental methods and techniques, which in turn assist with his general process of creating most of his works. Maka's specific style was showcased with his work Toga mo Bolata'ane, where he was selected alongside other Māori and Pasifika artists, including Lisa Reihana, FAFSWAG, Elisapeta Heta, and John Miller to exhibit this work at the 22nd Biennale in Sydney. Maka uses the traditional Tongan art form of Ngatu Tā 'Uli and painting to illustrate the relationship between the monarchs Queen Sālote Tupou III and Queen Elizabeth II and the wider implications of interconnectivity between Tonga and Britain.

In 2014 Maka was exhibited in the Tonga 'i Onopooni at Pataka Art and Museum in Lower Hutt, this was the first exhibition of contemporary Tongan artists living in New Zealand. His work from this exhibition Ngatu ta'uli (blackened tapa cloth) (2010) is now in the permanent collection of Te Papa, the national museum of New Zealand.

In 2020 Maka's art practice was welding contemporary and Tongan heritage art forms using spiderwebs to create intricate patterns on Ngatu.

== Solo exhibitions ==
2024, TUKUTONGA, Jonathan Smart Gallery, Christchurch

2022, Kumi Ē Manatu (Finding Black Tapa Memories), Johnathan Smart Gallery, Christchurch

2021, Toga mo Bolata'ane, Christchurch Art Gallery

2010, Tohinoa 'o 'eku Manatu – Journal of my Memories, Centre of Contemporary Art (CoAC), Christchurch

2009, Faka'ahu – Contemporary Fumage, toured to McCarthy Gallery, Auckland, Central Library, University of Canterbury, Christchurch, Centre of Contemporary Art (CoAC), Christchurch

2008, Ngatu tu 'uli (The Past is now), Centre of Contemporary Art (CoAC), Christchurch

2007, Papata pe ka na'e Lalanga (It may be course in texture, but it was woven), Vitu Pacific Festival, Christchurch

2004, Talamahu Market, Nuku'alofa, Tonga

2003, Uxbridge Art Gallery, Howick, Auckland

2002, Te Taumata Art Gallery, Grafton, Central Auckland

2002, Art by the Sea Gallery, Grafton, Central Auckland

2001, Carlton Hotel Ballroom, Newton, Central Auckland.

1998 – 2003, Auckland Pasifika Festival, Western Springs, Auckland

1997, Art of this World Gallery, Devonport, Auckland

1997, Manukau City Art Gallery, Manukau, Auckland

== Group exhibitions ==
2022, Te Atuitanga - Between Our Cloak of Stars, Bergman Gallery, Auckland

2020, Biennale of Sydney 2020 – NIRIN, Museum of Contemporary Art, Sydney, Australia

2019, Va Oceans Between, Turanga Library, Christchurch

2017, Kaitani, Physics Room, Christchurch

2017, First Thursdays Chch, The Colombo and Dilana Rugs Ltd Gallery, Christchurch

2014 - 2016, Tonga 'i Onopooni (Tonga Contemporary), tour - City Gallery, Invercargill, Ashburton, Timaru, Oamaru, Pataka Art + Museum, Porirua

2010, Visions of Utopia, Centre of Contemporary Art (CoAC), Christchurch

2008, Preview exhibition, Centre of Contemporary Art (CoAC), Christchurch

2008, Preview exhibition, Temple Gallery, Dunedin

2008, O'kaioceanikart Gallery, Auckland

2008, Margaret Stoddart Award Exhibition, Centre of Contemporary Art (CoAC), Christchurch

2007, Martin Hughes Contemporary Pacific Art Exhibition, Auckland

2007, Maka Tu'u Taha, Fresh Gallery, Otara, Auckland

2007, Our City O-Tautahi, Vitu Pacific Festival, Christchurch

2007, O'kaioceanikart Gallery, Auckland

2007, Williams Gallery, Petone, Wellington

== Awards and honours ==
- 2006 – To'utupu Tonga Trust Annual Art Excellence Award.
- 2007 – Martin Hughes Art Award: Finalist.
- 2008 – Margaret Stoddart Award for his work in the Festival of flowers.
- 2009 – Macmillan Brown Pacific Artist in residence for Creative New Zealand & University of Canterbury.
- 2011 – Emerging Pasifika Artist for Creative New Zealand Arts Pasifika Awards.
- 2022 - Pacific Contemporary Artist Award for Creative New Zealand Arts Pasifika Awards.
