= Janet Lilo =

New Zealand artist

Janet Lilo MNZM
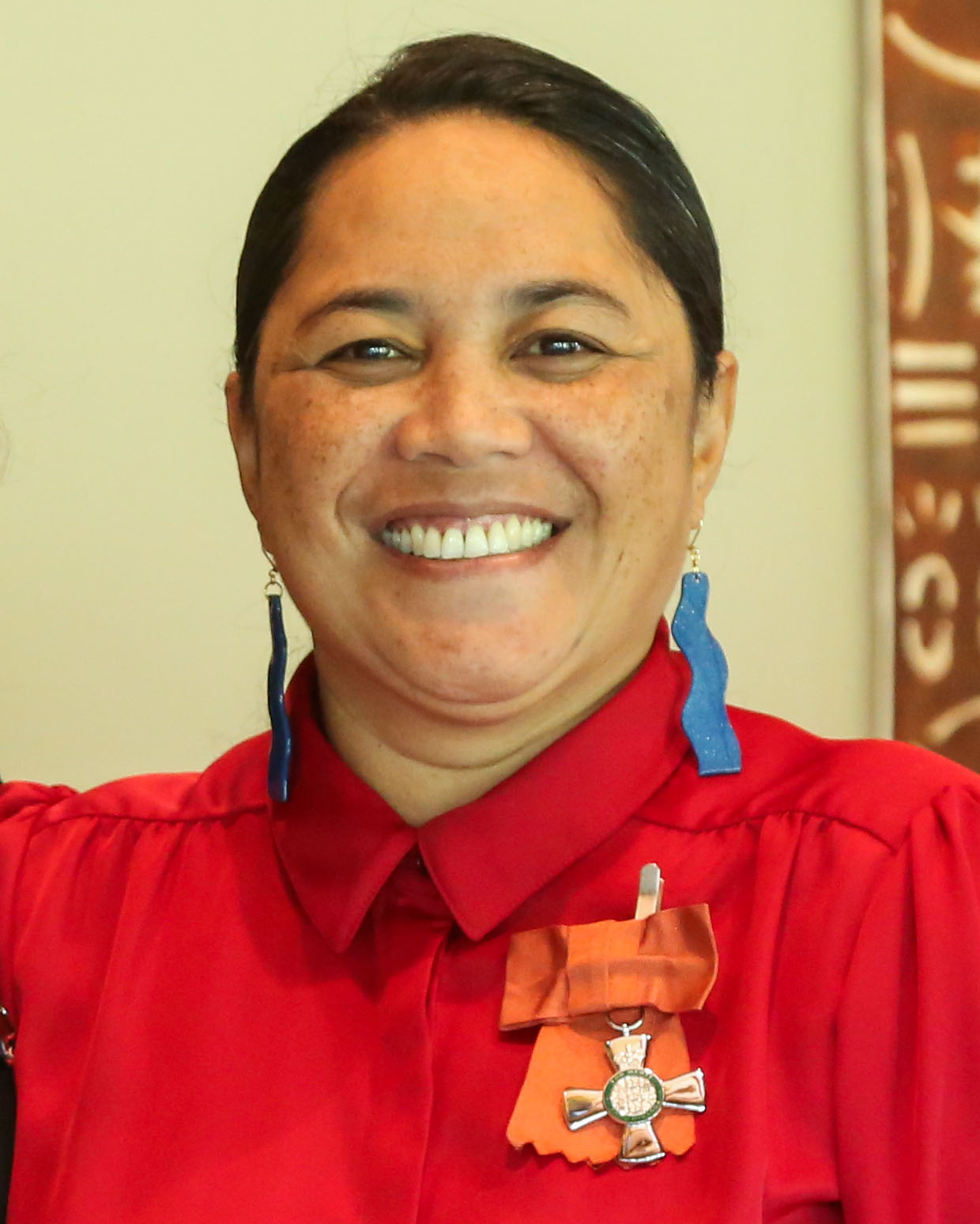
- Lilo in 2026
- Born: 1982 (age 43–44); Auckland, New Zealand
- Education: Auckland University of Technology
- Awards: Contemporary Pacific Art Award

Janet Crystal-Lee Lilo MNZM (born 1982) is a New Zealand visual artist.

== Biography ==
Lilo was born in 1982 in the Auckland region of New Zealand and is of Tainui, Ngāpuhi, Samoan, and Niuean descent. She received a Master of Arts degree in art and design from the Auckland University of Technology in 2007. The title of her master's thesis was Editing identity: Lost and found in translation.

A social commentator, Lilo uses digital photography, video, and multimedia installations to explore issues of popular culture. She utilises monitors and projections, displaying her work in gallery spaces, buildings, shop windows, and online.

Lilo has exhibited in solo shows in New Zealand, the Cook Islands, and Japan. She has exhibited internationally in group shows in Australia, Taiwan, Japan, Indonesia, France, Germany, and the United States of America. Lilo's video installation 'ParkLife' was part of the City Gallery Wellington's exhibition Telecom Prospect 2007: New Art New Zealand.

In 2009, Lilo received the JENESYS (Japan East Asia Network of Exchange of Students and Youths) residency in Sapporo.

In 2011, she received the Contemporary Pacific Art Award in the Creative New Zealand Arts Pasifika Awards.

In 2013, her installation Right of Way was presented at Artspace Aotearoa as part of the fifth Auckland Triennial, curated by Hou Hanru.

In 2016, she had a significant solo exhibition titled Janet Lilo: Status Update at Te Uru Waitākere Contemporary Gallery in Auckland. It was a survey of the last 10 years of her work, which included a collage of 10,000 photographs and a book.

Lilo's public artworks include a series of large-scale 'banana lightboxes' on Auckland's Karangahape Road, which are collectively titled Don't Dream it's Over.

Lilo received the 2017 annual commission from the Auckland Festival of Photography.

In the 2025 King’s Birthday Honours, Lilo was appointed a Member of the New Zealand Order of Merit, for services to the arts.

Lilo's works are held in important public collections, including the Auckland Art Gallery and Te Papa Tongarewa.
