= Cora-Allan Wickliffe =

Pasifika Hiapo Artist

Cora-Allan Lafaiki Twiss (née Wickliffe; born 1986) is a multidisciplinary Aotearoa (New Zealand)-based artist and hiapo (Niuean barkcloth) practitioner, Wickliffe was awarded the Arts Pasifika Award for Pacific Heritage Artist in 2020 through Creative New Zealand.

== Biography ==
Wickliffe is Niuean and Māori, with roots in Alofi and Liku, as well as Ngāpuhi and Tainui in Aotearoa. Originally from West Auckland, she was born in 1986. She completed a Bachelor of Visual Art and Design (in photography) in 2007 and completed her master's degree in visual art and design (in performance) from Auckland University of Technology in 2013.

Wickliffe is a founding member of the BC Collective (Before Cook), along with her husband Daniel Twiss.

Wickliffe is the only living traditional hiapo (Niuean barkcloth) maker, and is recognised for resurrecting this art genre. She distinguishes hiapo by imagery/motifs of 'botanical forms alone', differentiating it from tapa and other barkcloth forms in the Pacific. In 2020 Wickliffe published a book on hiapo, recognising hiapo as 'an art form that can be passed on to new generations.'

Wickliffe was represented by Bartley and Company who was a dealer gallery in Wellington. Her works are held in major collections such as Te Papa, Auckland War Memorial Museum, Lincoln University, The Arts House Trust, and Royal Academy of Arts.

In 2018, Wickliffe was awarded an artist's residency in Banff, Canada. In 2021, she received a Te Whare Hera Residency at Massey University. In the same year, she held the McCahon House Residency in Auckland.

She has exhibited in Canada, Australia, England, Niue and New Zealand.

== Publications ==
- Wickliffe, C.-A., & Lafaiki, F. (2020). Hiapo : a collection of patterns and motifs. Little Island Press.

== Selected curations ==
- 2020: Moana Legacy. Tautai Contemporary Pacific Arts Trust. Auckland.

== Selected exhibitions ==
Selected exhibitions
| Year | Title | Gallery | location |
|---|---|---|---|
| 2012 | Men of Matariki | Corban Estate Arts Centre | Auckland, New Zealand |
| 2013 | Same STORY, different COLOUR | ST PAUL ST GALLERY | Auckland, New Zealand |
| 2013 | Return to sender | Papakura Arts Gallery | Auckland, New Zealand |
| 2016 | Greetings from Canada | RM Gallery | Auckland, New Zealand |
| 2018 | Reliving Hiapo | Nathan Homestead Gallery | Auckland, New Zealand |
| 2018 | Everything is Kapai | Dunedin Art Gallery | Dunedin, New Zealand |
| 2019 | Documenting the land | Fatahega Lodge and Backpackers | Niue Arts and Cultural Festival |
| 2019 | From the Archives | Tim Melville Gallery, Auckland | Auckland, New Zealand |
| 2020 | Remember with me | The Grey Place | Auckland, New Zealand |
| 2020 | Our Last supper with you revised (Cora- Allan Wickliffe and Kelly Lafaiki.) | Tautai Gallery | Auckland, New Zealand |
| 2020 | Pacific Samplers (ft. Lonnie Hutchinson) | Bartley and Company | Wellington, New Zealand |
| 2021 | Roll with me | Fresh Gallery | Auckland, New Zealand |
| 2021 | Flowers from Niue | Bartley and Company | Wellington, New Zealand |
| 2022 | From Otītori Bay Rd | Te Uru | Auckland, New Zealand |
| 2022 | Histories on Hiapo | Bartley & Company Art | Wellington, New Zealand |

International exhibitions
| Year | Title | Gallery | Location |
|---|---|---|---|
| 2013 | Exotic weeds (ft. Shannon Brett.) | Kick Arts Gallery | Cairns, Australia |
| 2015 | #HUI Untitled | Art Society | Calgary, Canada |
| 2015 | Dusky Maiden | Elephant Artist Relief, Art Conference | Calgary, Canada |
| 2016 | Spring runoff | MST Festival | Calgary, Canada |
| 2016 | Found Footing | Whipper Snapper Gallery | Toronto, Canada |
| 2019 | The space between us | Black Dot Gallery | Melbourne, Australia |
| 2019 | Fifty Shade of Blak | Blak Dot Gallery | Melbourne, Australia |
| 2019 | Returns and Transits | Vancouver Art Gallery | Canada |

== Awards ==
- (2004) RSA Community Award.
- (2004–2008) Keir Trust Scholarship Award.
- (2017) Selected finalist for the Estuary Art Awards.
- (2019) Selected finalist Molly Morpeth Canaday Award.
- (2020) Creative New Zealand Pacific Heritage Artist award – Arts Pasifika Awards
- (2021) Selected finalist National Contemporary Art Award Waikato Museum
- (2021) Selected finalist Parkin Prize Award, Wellington
- (2021) Springboard Award, Arts Foundation of New Zealand (award includes mentorship from 2008 Arts Foundation Laureate Shane Cotton)
- (2022) Selected finalist Molly Morpeth Canaday Award.
