= Lakiloko Keakea =

Lakiloko Keakea MNZM
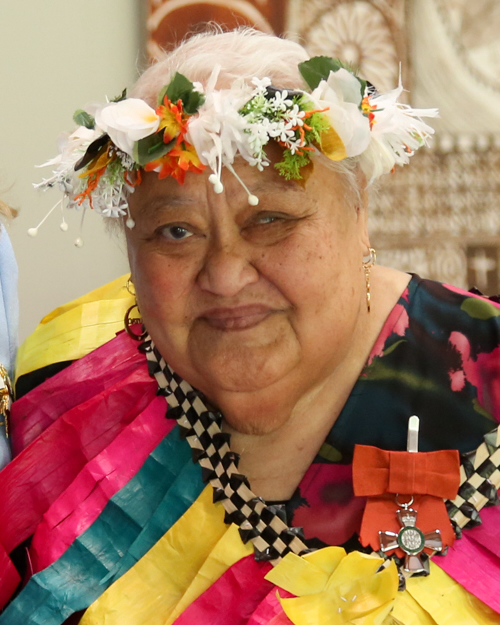
- Keakea in 2024
- Born: 1948 (age 76–77); Nui, Tuvalu
- Known for: Handicraft
- Notable work: Fafetu (2012)
- Awards: Creative New Zealand Pacific Heritage Art Award (2017)

Lakiloko Tepae Keakea MNZM (born 1948) is an artist from Tuvalu, living in New Zealand. She is a member of Fakapotopotoga Fafine Tuvalu – the Tuvalu Women’s arts collective.

== Background ==
Keakea was born in 1948, in Nui, Tuvalu. In 1957, Keakea moved to Niutao and in 1971 moved to Kiribati with her first husband. In 1996, she moved to New Zealand and currently lives in Ranui, Auckland.

== Career ==
Keakea is considered a mea taulima artist, meaning that she creates her artwork with her hands, and is a promoter of Pasifika handcrafts.

Keakea learned the practise of kolose (crochet) from her mother, at the age of 12, and began making dresses and tiputa (crochet tops). Keakea began making art in the 1950s, after moving to Niutao. Her first works included a belt, baskets, fans and trays. In the 1970s Keakea became active in Fakapotopotoga Fafine Tuvalu, an art group that taught and promoted the art practices of women from the various islands of Tuvalu. She travelled with the group to the Marshall Islands and learned the techniques of making fafetu, a star-shaped woven design. Keakea became well known for the practise, including teaching it to other artists.

In 2012 Keakea exhibited alongside several Pacific master artists in 'Home AKL: Artists of Pacific Heritage' at the Auckland Art Gallery Toi o Tāmaki.

Keakea's largest fafetu is held in the collection of the Auckland Art Gallery Toi o Tāmaki. She also has pieces in the collection of the Auckland War Memorial Museum.

In 2018, Keakea held a major solo exhibition Fafetu at Objectspace art gallery in Auckland. Fafetu was curated by Malama T-Pole, who promotes Tuvaluan art forms and is a member of the Niutao Community Trust. The Dowse Art Museum in Wellington held a solo exhibit of Keakea's work in 2019 in its first solo exhibit of Tuvaluan art.

== Honours and awards ==
In 2017, Keakea won the Pacific Heritage Art Award from the annual Creative New Zealand Arts Pasifika Awards. She was appointed a Member of the New Zealand Order of Merit in the 2023 New Year Honours, for services to Tuvaluan art.
