= Grace Taylor (poet) =

New Zealand poet (born c.1984)

Grace Teuila Evelyn Taylor
- Born: c. 1984; South Auckland
- Education: Auckland University of Technology
- Writing career
- Language: English

Grace Teuila Taylor is a New Zealand poet, writer, theatre maker, performer and director of Samoan and Palagi heritage. In 2008, Taylor was the recipient of the Auckland Writers Festival Poetry Idol Award. In 2012, she was given the World of Difference award from The Vodafone New Zealand Foundation. In 2014, she was awarded the Emerging Pacific Artist award at the Creative New Zealand Arts Pasifika Awards.

== Biography ==
Taylor is of English and Samoan heritage. She was born in about 1984 in South Auckland and refers to herself as "Afakasi" which is a Samoan transliteration of halfcaste. She has an MA in Youth Development from Auckland University of Technology.

In 2013, Taylor published her first collection of poetry, Afakasi Speaks. She has been published in literary journals including Hawai'i Review. Taylor wrote and performed the play My Own Darling, which has been performed in South Auckland and broadcast on Radio New Zealand.

Taylor has worked producing, mentoring and facilitating workshops and spoken word poetry programmes since 2007. She co-founded the South Auckland Poets Collective in 2008 and Niu Navigations in 2013 with Daren Kamali. In 2011 she co-founded the Rising Voices Youth Poetry Slam which is now an annual event in Auckland.

Taylor currently teaches creative writing and poetry at the University of Hawaiʻi at Mānoa.

== Awards ==
- In 2014 Taylor received the Emerging Artist award at the Creative New Zealand Arts Pasifika Awards.
- Taylor received the 2016 Auckland Mayoral Writers Grant to develop her new collection of poetry, City of Undone Darlings.
- In 2008, Taylor won the Auckland Writers Festival Poetry Idol award and received the 2012 Vodafone New Zealand Foundation World of Difference award.
