= Justine Simei-Barton =

Samoan film director in New Zealand

- Born: Porirua
- Citizenship: New Zealand
- Education: BA in English and political studies Postgraduate Diploma in Broadcasting
- Known for: theatre and film directing and producing

Justine Simei-Barton is a Samoan theatre and film director and producer in New Zealand.

== Early life and education ==
Simei-Barton was born in Porirua to Samoan parents. She says she saw few brown faces in theatre, but she was inspired by seeing Jim Moriarty play Hamlet, and Don Selwyn. Simei-Barton moved to Auckland to attend university in 1987.

Simei-Barton initially studied law, but graduated with a Bachelor of Arts in English and Political Studies from the University of Auckland, and then earned a post-graduate diploma in broadcasting.

== Work ==
Simei-Barton formed the Pacific Theatre company in 1987 based in Auckland.

Finding a script for a Papua New Guinea musical in the university library as a student led to Simei-Barton staging Feiva/Favour! (1988) at the Maidment Theatre's Little Theatre in Auckland. The show was a sell-out. It was also a springboard for other Pasifika performing artists, notably choreographers Iosefa (Sefa) Enari, founder of Pacific Dance New Zealand, choreographer Lemi Ponifasio, and film director Vela Manusaute, who turned up on Simei-Barton's doorstep begging to be involved. Actors included David Fane and Shimpal Lelisi.

In 1993 Simei-Barton directed The Contest written by her husband Paul Simei-Barton inspired by poem The Contest by Albert Wendt. Collaborators included choreographer Mary Jane O'Reilly, designer John Parker, costumier Suzanne Tamaki and a cast also including Fane and Lelisi and also Erolia Ifopo, Sefa Enari and Vela Manusaute. This production was presented at the Watershed Theatre in Auckland and at Taki Rua Theatre in Wellington.

Simei-Barton co-directed with Alan Brunton a performance of Romeo and Juliet for Auckland University's Summer Shakespeare in 1992, with an exclusively Pacific Island cast. The university did not welcome the production:

"That was so controversial I could not believe it," she says. "The university was 'not ready to see people running around in tapa cloths trying to speak English'. That was quoted to us in a memo from the committee, they found it quite offensive."

Tusitala and the House of Spirits by Paul Simei-Barton, (Maidment Theatre 1994, Taki Rua 1996) was a notable production initially Simei-Barton co-directed with Colin McColl. It is the story of English writer Robert Louis Stevenson's involvement in Samoan politics. Actors included Sylvia Rands and Martyn Sanderson.

These plays were part of the beginning of a movement for Pacific people presenting professional contemporary performing arts. Many of people worked on each others productions, with interchange for example between Pacific Underground in Christchurch and Simei-Bartons company in Auckland.

Simei-Barton moved into film and television work. This includes short films Brown Sugar (1995) and The Trophy (2008), The Overstayer, and Coming Home for the series "Tala Pasifika". Simei-Barton was producer, creator, writer, and director of the 2003 television series Good Hands–Lima Lelei, which took seven years to bring about. The series is about a South Auckland-based netball team, and was nominated for Best Drama Series and Best Supporting Actress at the 2005 NZ Screen Awards. Simei-Barton has worked with producers Don Selwyn and Ross Jennings, cinematographer Allen Guilford.

In 2007, Simei-Barton directed a play by Jason Greenwood, Lena, at the Herald Theatre in Auckland.

Simei-Barton directed the production of Wanjiku Kiarie Sanderson's New Zealand African play In Transit in May 2017 at Mangere Arts Centre.

== Awards and honours ==
Simei-Barton was awarded a Senior Pacific Artist Award in 2007 as part of Creative New Zealand's Arts Pasifika Awards.

She has won a QEII Arts Council Travel Grant and the Rockefeller Foundation Travel Award.

== Personal life ==
Simei-Barton is married to writer and teacher Paul Simei-Barton.
