= Pacific Sisters =

Pacific and Māori artist collective

Pacific Sisters is a collective of Pacific and Māori artists, performers, fashion designers, jewellers and musicians.

== Establishment and early years ==
The collective was formed in 1992 by Selina Forsyth (Samoan) Niwhai Tupaea (Ngāti Katoa) and Suzanne Tamaki (Tūhoe, Te Arawa, Ngāti Maniapoto). The sisterhood also includes Rosanna Raymond (Samoan), Feeonaa Wall (Samoan), Ani O'Neill (Cook Islands), Lisa Reihana (Ngā Puhi), Jaunnie Ilolahia (Tongan) and is inclusive of Pacific Soles: Henry Taripo (Cook Islands) and Karlos Quartez (Cook Islands) and Greg Semu (Samoan).

Throughout the 1990s Pacific Sisters collaborated in the production of fashion shows, art performances and musical events. Karen Stevenson, author of The Frangipani is Dead: Contemporary Pacific Art in New Zealand writes, “Challenging the established art canon, The Pacific Sisters combined costume, tradition, dance and the catwalk with the energetic rhythms of hip hop”. The Sisters created a stage for expression of urban Māori and Pacific identity within New Zealand, as Jacqueline Charles Rault wrote ‘The Pacific Sisters were and remain provocative, sexy and rebellious’

In 1994 Pacific Sisters performed at the Auckland Art Gallery for the opening of Bottled Ocean, curated by Jim Vivieaere. In 1996 the Sisters were invited and also received funding from Creative New Zealand to perform in Samoa for the seventh Festival of Pacific Arts: Tala Measina. They developed Motu Tangata, a contemporary realisation of the narrative of Ina/Hina and Tuna. The festival abstained from officially hosting Motu Tangata, aware of the implications a contemporary style of performance such as Motu Tangata could have at an event that celebrated customary practices from the Pacific. For two consecutive nights however, the Sisters performed Motu Tangata at the Hotel Kitano Tusitala.

In 1998 their performance Tribe Vibe and the Extended Family Mix was selected as part of Sydney's Pacific Wave Festival. 1998 also saw their work exhibited in Tūrangawaewae, the 3rd New Zealand Jewellery Biennale at The Dowse and in Raw Fish, at The Physics Room in Christchurch. In 2000 Pacific Sisters performed at the opening of the Biennale of Sydney in collaboration with Lisa Reihana.

== Recent years ==
In 2011 Pacific Sisters reunited to present Pacific Sisters SOUTHSIDE: EyeKonik at the Mangere Arts Centre – Ngā Tohu o Uenuku as part of the 2011 Pacific Arts Summit.

Their work 21st Century Cyber Sister is held in the collection of the Museum of New Zealand Te Papa Tongarewa.

In March 2018 Te Papa opened its new art spaces, Toi Art. The opening exhibition included Pacific Sisters: Fashion Activists, "a celebration of mana wāhine, indigenous identities, and the role this collective has played over the past 26 years – through their collaborative works across fashion, performance, music, and film – in giving voice and visibility to Māori and Pacific peoples in Aotearoa New Zealand," curated by Nina Tonga. This exhibition toured to the Auckland Art Gallery Toi o Tāmiki between Sat 23 Feb 2019 — Sun 14 Jul 2019 and provoked the following thought in an essay on the Auckland University digital platform Perspective in response to the question: In what ways does the Pacific Sisters’ ‘fashion activism’ challenge pre-existing ideas of identity and gender?:

"The Pacific Sisters’ “fashion activism” embraces hybridity to challenge the ways in which pākehā hegemony has determined their identity, by creating new dress forms and rituals that reflect urban diasporic reality, and reinforcing agency over their own gender representation." Kate Harris
