= Tusiata Avia =

New Zealand poet and children's author

Tusiata Avia MNZM
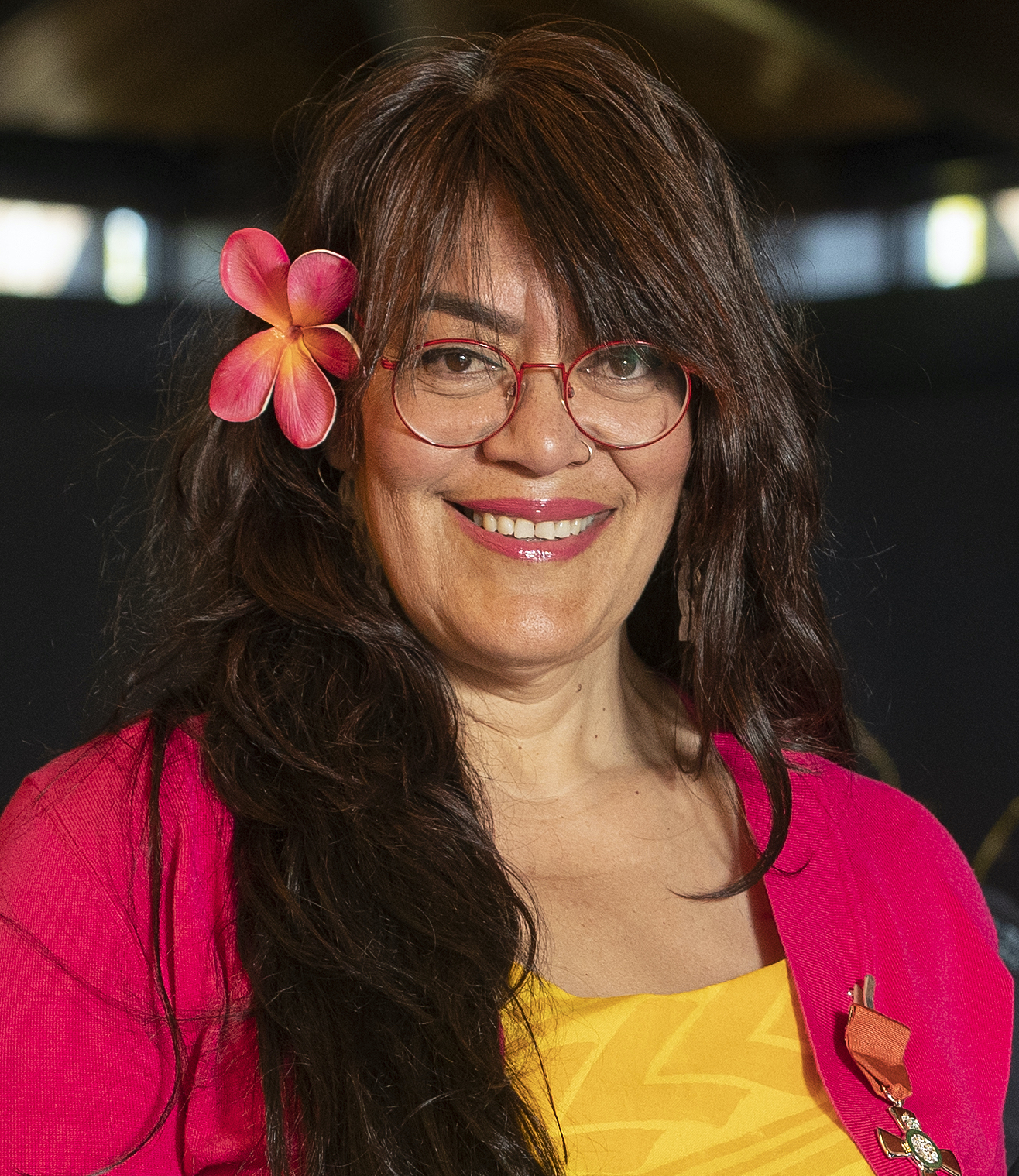
- Avia in 2020
- Born: 1966 (age 59–60); Christchurch, New Zealand
- Education: University of Canterbury, International Institute of Modern Letters
- Occupations: Poet, performance artist, children's author
- Writing career
- Notable awards: Emerging Pacific Artist, Arts Pasifka Awards (2006)

Donna Tusiata Avia MNZM (born 1966) is a New Zealand poet and children's author. She has been recognised for her work through receiving a 2020 Queen's Birthday Honour and in 2021 her collection The Savage Coloniser won the Mary and Peter Biggs Award for Poetry at the Ockham New Zealand Book Awards. The Savage Coloniser and her previous work Wild Dogs Under My Skirt have been turned into live stage plays presented in a number of locations.

== Background ==
Avia was born and raised in Christchurch, New Zealand. Her father is Samoan and her mother is New Zealand European. Avia graduated from the University of Canterbury and in 2002 received an MA in creative writing from the International Institute of Modern Letters. Avia currently resides in the Christchurch suburb of Aranui.

== Career ==
Avia's poetry explores Pasifika and cross-cultural themes, as well as the borders between traditional and contemporary life, and between place and the self.

Avia has toured both nationally and internationally performing her solo show Wild Dogs Under My Skirt which premiered at the 2002 Dunedin Fringe Festival. She is a creative writing lecturer at the Manukau Institute of Technology.

Wild Dogs Under My Skirt was presented by Auckland Arts Festival and Silo Theatre for Auckland Arts Festival in 2019 with an ensemble cast rather than as a solo. It went on to tour New Zealand receiving critical acclaim including winning Best Director, Best Production and Best Lighting Design at the Wellington Theatre Awards. A presentation at the Soho Playhouse in New York, USA followed in 2020 with the following credits: Directed by Anapela Polata'ivao, Cast – Joanna Mika-Toloa, Petmal Petelo, Ilasiaane Green, Stacey Leilua, Vaimaila Carolyn Baker, Anapela Polata'ivao, Musician – Leki Jackson Bourke, Choreography and Stage Manager: Mario Faumui, Set Design: Jane Hakaraia with artwork motifs by Tyler Vaeau. Cast member Stacey Leilua said in an interview,

"I love the fact that we are bringing Tusiata's very unique voice to the New York stage. Being able to connect with our ensemble, and with new audiences in a feminist sense is incredibly empowering. I love hearing from women after the show who are so moved by the work, and really understand the deep value of it."

Selected poetry by Avia was included in UPU, a compilation of Pacific Island writers’ work which was first presented at the Silo Theatre as part of the Auckland Arts Festival in March 2020. UPU was remounted as part of the Kia Mau Festival in Wellington in June 2021.

Poetry by Avia has appeared in numerous literary journals such as Takahe, Sport, Turbine, and Trout. She has been published in the Best New Zealand Poems series, including the 2004, 2009, 2011, and 2017.

In March 2023, Avia attracted media attention about her confronting poem The Savage Coloniser about British explorer Captain James Cook and his association with the legacy of British colonialism in New Zealand. The poetry was in the media in the leadup to the premiere of the theatre performance The Savage Coloniser programmed in the Auckland Arts Festival in February 2023. Avia was criticised for allegedly promoting reverse racism and violence by right-wing YouTuber Lee Williams, The Platform host Sean Plunket, ACT Party leader David Seymour, New Zealand First party leader Winston Peters, and Kiwiblog founder David Farrar. Plunket and Seymour also criticised Creative New Zealand for using taxpayer funding to sponsor Avia's book and stage show. The attention meant that 2023 Avia became a target for harassment and death threats. Avia defended her poem and accused the ACT Party of misrepresenting her work. Avia was also supported by The Spinoff book editor Claire Mabey, New Zealand Poets Laureate Selina Tusitala Marsh and Chris Tse, University of Waikato indigenous studies Associate Professor Waikaremoana Waitoki, and Creative New Zealand, who defended the poem on artistic, free speech, and historical grounds. Human Rights Commissioner Meng Foon confirmed that the watchdog had received complaints about the poem. Further performances of The Savage Coloniser were held in Auckland between 9 and 12 March and at the Wānaka Festival of Colour in Wānaka on 28 March 2023.

== Honours, awards and residencies ==
In 2005, Avia was awarded the Fulbright-Creative New Zealand Pacific Writer's Residency at the University of Hawai‘i and was the artist-in-residence at the Macmillan Brown Centre for Pacific Studies at the University of Canterbury. In 2006, she won the Emerging Pacific Artist award at the Creative New Zealand Arts Pasifika Awards. and was shortlisted for the Prize in Modern Letters in 2006.

Avia was the 2010 Ursula Bethell writer in residence at the University of Canterbury. In 2013, she received the Janet Frame Literary Trust Award. In 2017, her poetry collection, Fale Aitu – Spirit House, was shortlisted for the Poetry Award at the Ockham New Zealand Book Awards. It was described by the judges as an "urgent, politicised collection, which finds eloquent ways to dramatise and speak out against horrors, injustices and abuses, both domestic and public".

In the 2020 Queen's Birthday Honours, Avia was appointed a Member of the New Zealand Order of Merit, for services to poetry and the arts. She was also made an Arts Foundation Laureate, receiving a NZ$25,000 award and recognition as one of New Zealand's most outstanding artists. The Arts Foundation described her poetry as "revolutionary" and said it "redefines the face of Pacific and New Zealand literature".

In 2021, The Savage Coloniser Book won the Poetry Award at the Ockham New Zealand Book Awards. She was the first Pasifika woman to win this award, and the collection was described by the judges as "a book bursting with alofa, profound pantoums, profanity and FafSwaggering stances, garrulously funny, bleakly satirical, magnificent".

In December 2023, Avia received the Prime Minister's Award for Poetry, a once-in-a-lifetime award with a $60,000 prize attached.

In October 2024, at the Creative New Zealand Arts Pasifika Awards, Avia received the Senior Pacific Artist award, with a $25,000 prize attached.

In 2025, Avia was named the 2026 International Institute of Modern Letters Writer in Residence. She will be based at Te Herenga Waka University of Wellington.

== Published works ==
- Giving Birth to My Father (Te Herenga Waka University Press, 2025), poetry
- Big Fat Brown Bitch (Te Herenga Waka University Press, 2023), poetry
- The Savage Coloniser Book (Victoria University Press, 2020), poetry
- Fale Aitu – Spirit House (Victoria University Press, 2016), poetry
- Bloodclot (Victoria University Press, 2009), poetry
- Wild Dogs Under My Skirt (Victoria University Press, 2004), poetry
- Mele and the Fofo (Victoria University Press, 2004), children's book
- The Song (Victoria University Press, 2002), children's book
