= Black Grace =

Internationally touring New Zealand dance company

General information
- Name: Black Grace
- Year founded: 1995
- Founder: Neil Ieremia
- Website: https://blackgrace.co.nz/

Black Grace is one of New Zealand's leading contemporary dance companies. Founded by Neil Ieremia in 1995, Ieremia draws from his Samoan and New Zealand roots to create innovative dance works that reach across social, cultural and generational barriers. Black Grace is known for being highly physical, rich in the storytelling traditions of the South Pacific.

== History ==
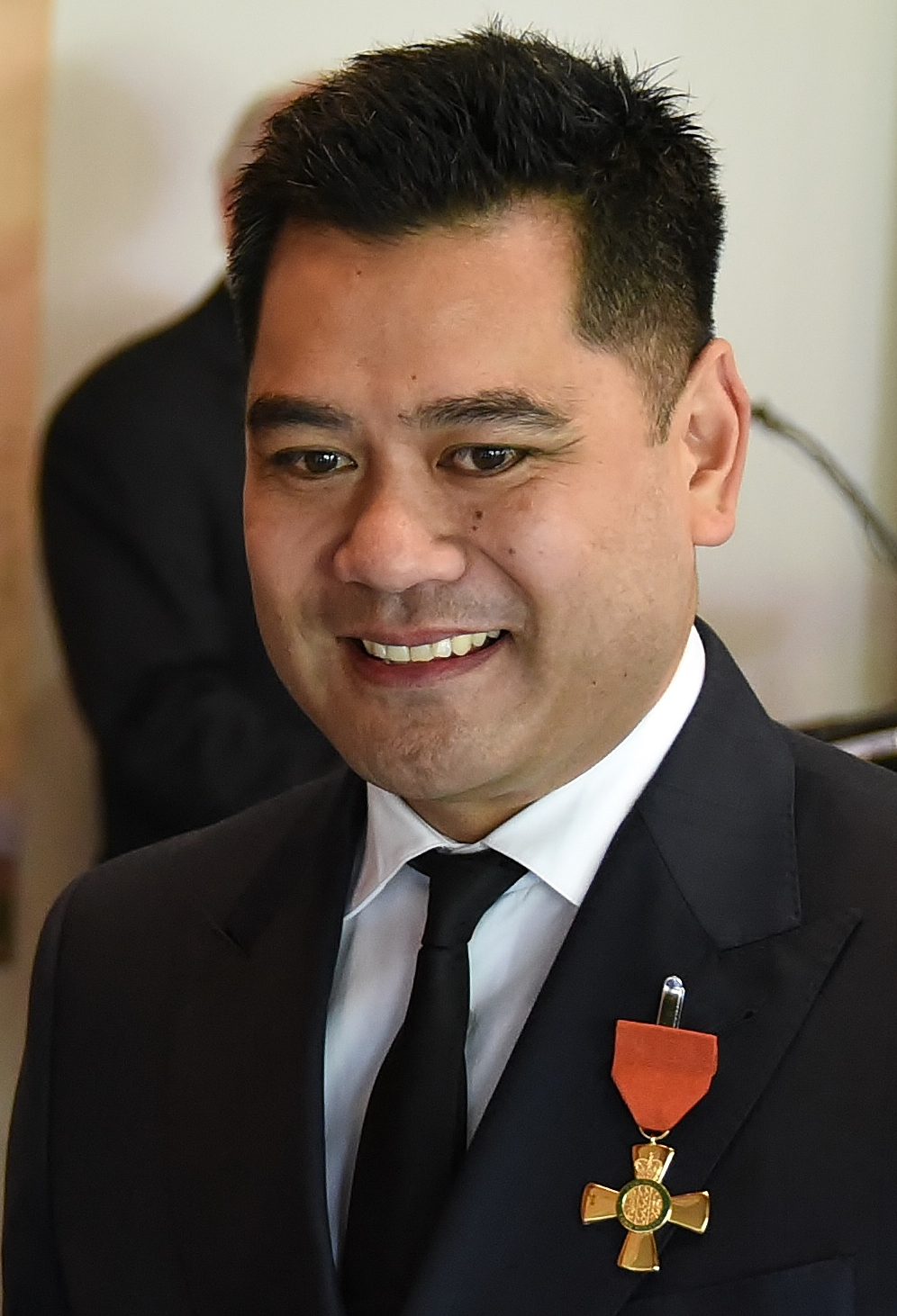
Founder Neil Ieremia in 2017

In 1995, Neil Ieremia formed Black Grace Dance Company at Auckland's Maidment Theatre. Black Grace was initially made up of ten male dancers of Pacific, Māori and New Zealand Pākehā heritage and stayed a strictly all-male company until 2001.

In 2002, Ieremia debuted a production brand called Black Grace & Friends, where guest choreographers or senior company members were invited to create short works on the company. It was when a guest choreographer pulled out of the project at the last minute, that Ieremia had to step in to complete the programme, when he had the idea for a work titled Human Language. This was the first work that Black Grace included women in the cast. Up until this point, Black Grace had only allowed females to participate in youth projects that Black Grace facilitated. “Having some very good young women in the company changed the possibilities and creativity, they offered so much more. Men come to training late and the women often had early ballet training and having that to work with as a choreographer really opened things up.” (Ieremia, 2015)

In 2004 Black Grace was invited to perform at Jacob's Pillow dance centre in the US; the first New Zealand company to ever receive an invitation. The invitation to perform at Jacob’s Pillow catapulted Ieremia as a choreographer and Black Grace into the highly competitive American market and the international stage. Since then, Black Grace performed in Australia, Canada, Germany, Holland, France, Japan, Luxembourg, Mexico, New Caledonia, South Korea, Switzerland and the United States of America. Among the company’s international highlights are sell-out performances at Jacob’s Pillow Dance Festival in Massachusetts and a four-week season on New York City’s 42nd Street, as well as performances at Cervantino Festival in Mexico, John F. Kennedy Center for the Performing Arts in Washington D.C, and the 2010 Cultural Olympiad in Vancouver.

In September 2022, Black Grace performed a piece in United States, and New Zealand named Fatu (Heart), inspired by New Zealand Samoan artist Fatu Feu’u.

In 2025, Black Grace turned 30.

== Name ==
The name Black Grace combines a word that in New Zealand is slang for daring and bravery with a quality not attributed to men. Neil Ieremia explains that “the word ‘black’ is a word we used to describe each other at high school. But it was a positive term. So, if you’d been impressed by something your mate had done, like, ask the prettiest girl out on a date, you might say, “gee, bro, you’re black”, and that was a compliment. We were taking a word that had been used in a negative way, and we were giving it a different meaning. Brave, bold, it’s not really a reference to colour at all. And, as for ‘grace’, that’s something my ballet teacher used to tell me that I lacked. She kept saying, “you need more grace, you need more grace!”. When I first coined the name, “Black Grace”, everyone hated it, so that’s why I chose it. That’s what we are as a company, as an entity, we go against the grain. It’s doing something that other people think is stupid or foolhardy. That’s what Black Grace means. It’s a mission statement.” (Ieremia, 2018)

== Works ==
Year	Title
1995	Black Grace
1995	Relentless
1996	Compression
1996	New Works
1998	Deep Far
1998	Fia Ola
1999	Minoi
1999	Enter the Fu
1999	Fresh
2000	In Moving Memory
2000	Method
2000	Creek Boys
2000	New Religion
2000	UrbanYOUTHMovement (UYM)
2002	Human Language
2002	Malaga
2002	Escape - UYM
2003	Escape... Again - UYM
2003	Surface
2004	Objects
2004	This Life - UYM
2005	Ten
2005	Open Letter
2007	Amata
2008	Minoi 2
2008	War Brides
2009	Gathering Clouds
2009	Pati Pati
2009	You Better Run Boy - UYM
2010	Who Are You - UYM
2010	Verses
2011	Migration
2012	Vaka
2013	Mother Mother
2013	Xmas Versees
2014	Totem
2015	Siva
2016	Another Letter From Earth
2016	As Night Falls
2018	Black Grace + Friends
2018	Lucky Dip
2018	Elephantic
2018	Crying Men
2019	Kiona and the Little Bird Suite
2020	3 Dances
2020	Verses
2020	Virtual Verses
2021	The Outsiders' Ball
2022	O Le Olaga - Life
2022	Fatu

== Filmography ==
- 2005 From Cannon’s Creek to Jacob’s Pillow. Documentary – Aileen O'Sullivan and Toby Mills
- 2013 Mother Mother. Music Video – Fat Freddy’s Drop
- 2021 Elephantic. Short dance film based on the book Elephantic authored by Neil Ieremia and illustrated by Pati Fuiava.
