= Daren Kamali =

Personal details
- Born: 1975 (age 50–51) Fiji
- Party: Labour
- Spouse: Carmel Sepuloni (m. 2018)
- Education: Manukau Institute of Technology; University of Auckland

Daren (DK) Kamali (born 1975) is a Fijian-born New Zealand poet, writer, musician, and teacher and museum curator.

== Education ==
Kamali completed his Bachelor's degree in Creative Writing at Manukau Institute of Technology in New Zealand in 2014 Kamali graduated with a Masters in Creative Writing from the University of Auckland in New Zealand in 2016.

== Career ==
In 2004, he served as the New Zealand delegate for the Festival of Pacific Arts in Palau, and again in Solomon Islands in 2012. In 2008, together with Grace Taylor and Ramon Narayan he co-founded the South Auckland Poets Collective.

The South Auckland Poets Collective was co-founded by Kamai in 2008.

Kamali was the recipient of the 2012 Fulbright-Creative New Zealand Pacific Writers' Residency, which he completed at the University of Hawaiʻi at Mānoa in Honolulu, Hawaiʻi. He used the time to continue work on his second book, Squid Out of Water (Ala Press 2014). In 2014, he participated in the International Writing Program's Fall Residency at the University of Iowa in Iowa City, Iowa.

In 2015 he was invited to present his poetry at the Singapore Writer's Festival. From 2013 to 2017 Daren was a Pacific Educator at the Auckland War Memorial Museum. He has been employed as the Senior Pacific Curator for Auckland Libraries in 2022 was in the role of Heritage Pacific Advisor.

Projects include a collection of memoir poems called Vunimaqo: The Mango Bar Collections and a collection of Pan-Pacific myth poetry What Becomes of the Flying Squid? In August 2022 he published a poetry anthology book titled, Rough Lives Speak after in 2021 founding the Street Poets & Artists Collective Enterprise (SPACE) in 2021 and working with former rough sleepers.

Poetry by Kamali was included in UPU, a curation of Pacific Island writers’ work which was first presented at the Silo Theatre as part of the Auckland Arts Festival in March 2020. UPU was remounted as part of the Kia Mau Festival in Wellington in June 2021.

In 2021 Kamali, Ole Maiava and artist Joana Monolagi presented research work called The Ulumate Project: Sacredness of Human Hair about the Fijian custom of wig ceremonies in times of mourning. Monolagi wove a contemporary 'ulu cavu' wig from Kamali's hair.

Kamali was awarded the Pacific Heritage Arts Award at the Arts Pasifika Awards 2022. They said his work is,'inspired by his upbringing in Fiji and Aotearoa, incorporating poetry, visual arts, performance arts, and sound/musicality with a Pan Pacific approach.'

== Personal life ==
Kamali is of Fijian, Uvean, Futunan, Samoan and Scottish descent. He was born in 1975 in Suva, Fiji, and has lived in New Zealand since 1992. He is married to Carmel Sepuloni, Deputy Prime Minister of New Zealand, and Labour Party MP for Kelston.

== Music ==
Kamali’s debut album, Immigrant Story (2000), and EP album, Keep it Real (2005), share his personal experiences migrating to Aotearoa New Zealand from Fiji in 1992. Daren infuses his Fijian and Wallis and Futunan heritage with poetry and creative writing by including chants, songs, and oral traditions. Much of his work is inspired and influenced by his experiences and upbringing in Fiji and in Aotearoa New Zealand. He has a tendency to work across genres and languages, creating a unique blend of beats and lyrics. As a native speaker of Fijian, Kamali works with metaphors, imagery, and rhythm of the Fijian, English, and Māori languages.

== Six Pack Sound ==
Daren Kamali features in Six Pack Sound #05, a collection of recordings by poets working in Aotearoa New Zealand and the Pacific region, released on 22 May 2017

== Selected works ==
- Tales, Poems, and Songs from the Underwater World (2011)
- Squid Out of Water; the evolution, Ala Press (2014)
- Vunimaqo and Me: Mango Tree Collections (2021)

Honorary titles
Preceded by Alf Kaiwai	Spouse of the Deputy Prime Minister of New Zealand; 2023	Succeeded by Jan Trotman as Partner of the Deputy Prime Minister of New Zealand
