= Yuki Kihara =

New Zealand artist

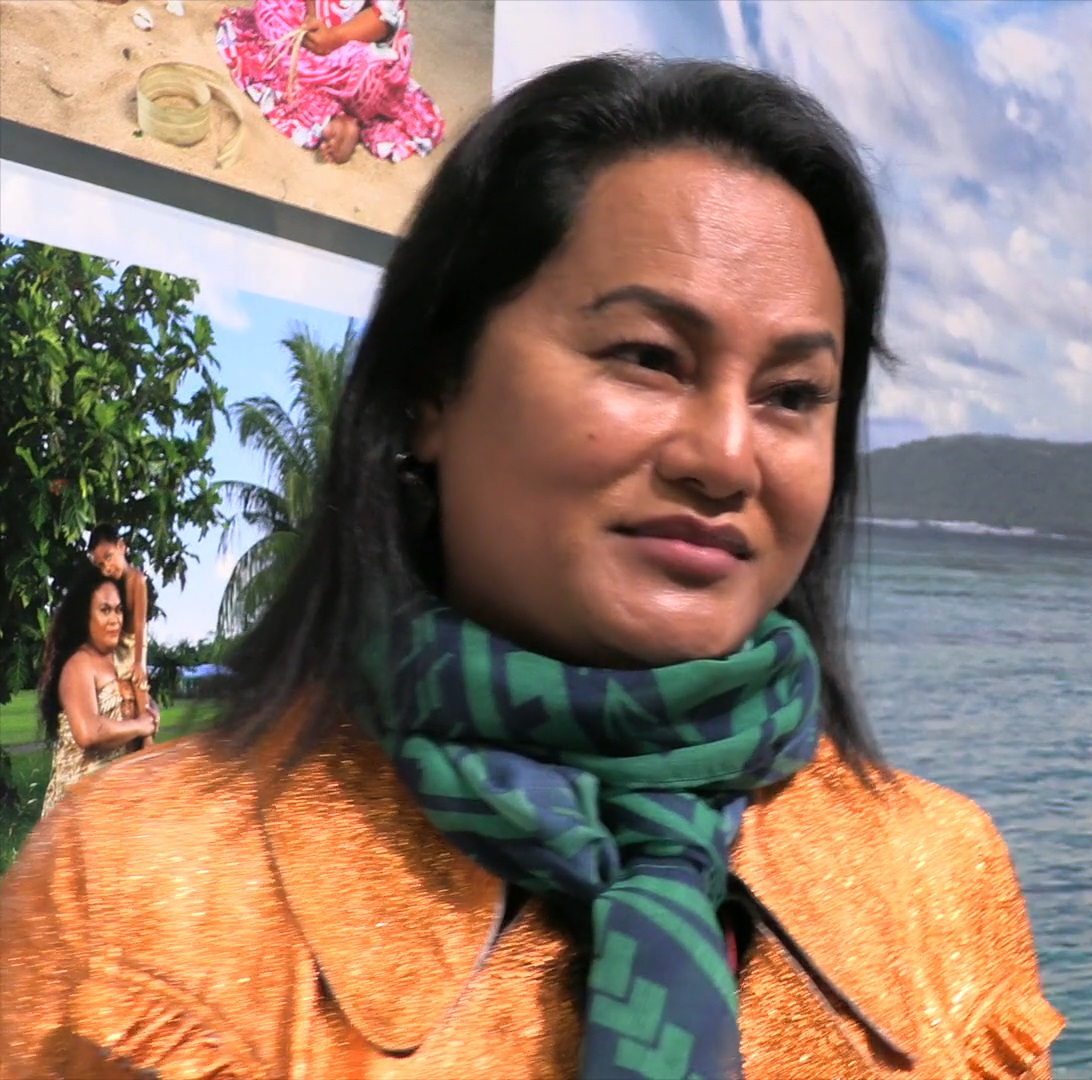
- Yuki Kihara 2022
- Born: 1975 (age 50–51); Samoa
- Education: Wellington Polytech
- Known for: Multidisciplinary artwork focusing on subverting stereotypes and norms
- Notable work: Shigeyuki Kihara: Living Photographs
- Website: yukikihara.ws

Shigeyuki "Yuki" Kihara (born 1975) is an interdisciplinary artist of Japanese and Samoan descent. In 2008, her work was the subject of a solo exhibition at the Metropolitan Museum of Art in New York; it was the first time a New Zealander and the first time a Pacific Islander had a solo show at the institution. Titled Shigeyuki Kihara: Living Photographs, the exhibition opened from 7 October 2008 to 1 February 2009. Kihara's self-portrait photographs in the exhibitions included nudes in poses that portrayed colonial images of Polynesian people as sexual objects. Her exhibition was followed by an acquisition of Kihara's work for the museum's collection.

Much of Kihara's work challenges cultural stereotypes and dominant norms of sexuality and gender found across the globe. Kihara is also a fa'afafine, the third gender of Samoa. Born in Samoa, Kihara's mother is Samoan and her father is Japanese. Kihara immigrated to Wellington, New Zealand, at the age of fifteen to further her studies. She trained in fashion design at Wellington Polytech (now Massey University). In 1995, while still a student, Kihara's Graffiti Dress – Bombacific was purchased by the Museum of New Zealand Te Papa Tongarewa (Te Papa). Kihara's exhibition Teuanoa'i: Adorn to Excess was composed of twenty six t-shirts that took large corporations' logos and re-appropriated them. Kihara described the concept "to subvert the system of power which governs the lives of Indigenous peoples today."

Kihara lives and works in Samoa, where she has been based over the last 10 years.

== Exhibitions ==
Kihara has exhibited their work extensively in New Zealand and internationally with solo exhibitions including: Fa'a fafine: In a manner of a woman, Sherman Galleries, Sydney, 2005; Vavau: Tales of Ancient Samoa, The Gus Fisher Gallery, University of Auckland, 2006; Undressing the Pacific, Hocken Collections' art gallery, University of Otago, 2013; and A Study of a Samoan Savage at Te Uru Waitakere Contemporary Gallery, 2016. Kihara's works have been presented at The Asia Pacific Triennale (2002 & 2015); Auckland Triennale (2009); Sakahàn Quinquennial (2013); Daegu Photo Biennale (2014); Honolulu Biennale (2017) and The Bangkok Art Biennale (2018).

== Collections ==
Kihara's work can be found in the public collections of; Te Papa Tongarewa Museum of New Zealand; Auckland Art Gallery, New Zealand; The University of Auckland Art Collection, New Zealand; Massey University, New Zealand; Hocken Collections, Dunedin, New Zealand; Waikato Museum, New Zealand; Sherman Contemporary Art Foundation, Sydney Australia; Museum of Contemporary Art, Sydney Australia; Tjibaou Cultural Centre, New Caledonia; University of Cambridge Museum of Archeology and Anthropology, UK; The Metropolitan Museum of Art, New York and the Museum of Modern Art, New York.

== Performance art ==
Kihara's solo performance entitled Taualuga; the last dance was first performed at the 4th Asia-Pacific Triennial of Contemporary Art, held in Brisbane, in 2004 and has subsequently been performed at Haus der Kulturen der Welt (Berlin), Musée du Quai Branly (Paris) and the Govett-Brewster Art Gallery (New Plymouth, New Zealand).

In this piece she performs as Salome, a persona inspired by a photograph taken by Thomas Andrew which, uncharacteristically of a photograph of its time, showed a Sāmoan woman dancing in full Victorian dress. In doing so Kihara sought to show her lament for Sāmoa and the grief of colonialism combine with the resilience shown by so many people. Later the piece was expanded and created as a video work in 2006.

== Curating and writing ==
As a curator, Kihara curated a number of exhibitions, among others, including ‘Hand in Hand’ (1999) co-curated with Jenny Fraser featuring over 30 queer Indigenous artists across Oceania presented between Boomalli Aboriginal Arts Collective and Performance Space as part of The Sydney Gay Mardi Gras. She also collaborated with Banaban scholar and artist Katerina Teaiwa on Project Banaba, at Carriageworks, NSW, Australia, November–December 2017. The project continues to tour; ‘Project Banaba’ was recently presented at MTG Hawke's Bay Tai Ahuriri; and will be touring The Oceania Arts Centre, The University of the South Pacific in Suva, Fiji opening in November 2020.

In 2015, Kihara collaborated as artistic co-director alongside Berlin-based choreographer Jochen Roller on a dance production entitled ‘Them and Us’ which premiered at Sophiensaele, Berlin and toured across Germany and Switzerland. Roller and Kihara are currently working on a major dance production entitled ‘Crosscurrents’ which premiers in Germany in 2020. The research and development of ‘Crosscurrents’ is supported by Fonds Darstellende Künste.

A publication entitled Samoan Queer Lives featuring 14 autobiographical chapters from Fa’afafine & LGBTIQ+ Samoans based in Samoa, American Samoa, Australia, Aotearoa New Zealand, Hawai’i & Turtle Island USA co-edited by Kihara and Dan Taulapapa McMullin published by Little Island Press was launched in October 2018 in Apia, Upolu Island, Samoa with the support of The New Zealand High Commission. As a writer, Kihara's essays have been published in Prestel, Cambridge Scholars Publishing and University of Hawaii Press.

== Awards ==
Yuki Kihara was the recipient of the Creative New Zealand Emerging Pacific Artist Award at the 2003 Arts Pasifika Awards. In 2007, she was also the first artist-in-residence at The Physics Rooms Art Residency in Christchurch. In 2012, she was awarded the Wallace Art Awards Paramount Award.

== Venice Biennale ==
Yuki Kihara represented New Zealand at the 2021 Venice Biennale, making her the second artist of Pacific descent to represent the country at the world's oldest art biennales. Lemi Ponifasio was the first in 2003, 2010 and 2015
