= Suzanne Tamaki =

New Zealand artist

Suzanne Tamaki is a New Zealand fibre-based artist of Te Arawa, Ngāti Maniapoto and Tūhoe descent. She operates under the label Native Sista and was one of the founding members of the Pacific Sisters. Informed by indigenous concerns of New Zealand, Tamaki's jewellery, fashion and photography portrays a reclamation of colonised spaces. As Megan Tamati-Quenell writes, her works 'are created conceptually, provocatively and with political intent'.

== Collaboration ==
A founding member of Pacific Sisters, Suzanne continues to collaborate with artists. Her photographs that featured in the City Gallery Wellington exhibition Maiden Aotearoa saw her produce work with photographers Greg Semu and Norman Heke. Suzanne's work is a regular feature at the Toi Māori Art Market which she says is 'a unique opportunity for her to meet like-minded Māori' and states that 'many collaborations are formed between Māori'.

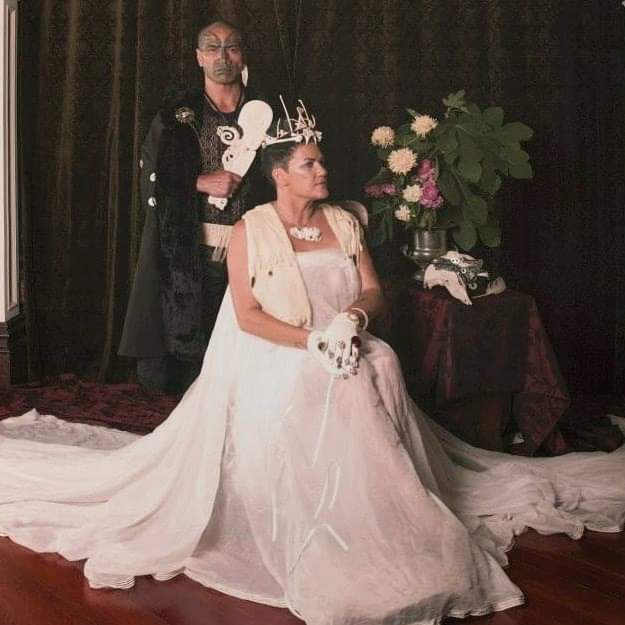
Suzanne Tamaki as the Queen

== Selected exhibitions ==
- 2014 Ebbing Tagaloa Enjoy Public Art Gallery
- 2011 Maiden Aotearoa City Gallery Wellington
- 2008 Manu Wāhine The British Museum
- 2006 Native Eye City Art Gallery
- 2005 Blanket Stitch Objectspace
- 2005 Pasifika Styles University of Cambridge Museum of Archaeology and Anthropology, UK.
- 2004 Burning Desire Breast Plate The Dowse Art Museum

== Collections ==
Tamaki's work is held in the collection of The Museum of New Zealand Te Papa Tongarewa, The Dowse Art Museum, and the Museum of Archaeology and Anthropology, University of Cambridge.
