= Neil Ieremia =

New Zealand choreographer

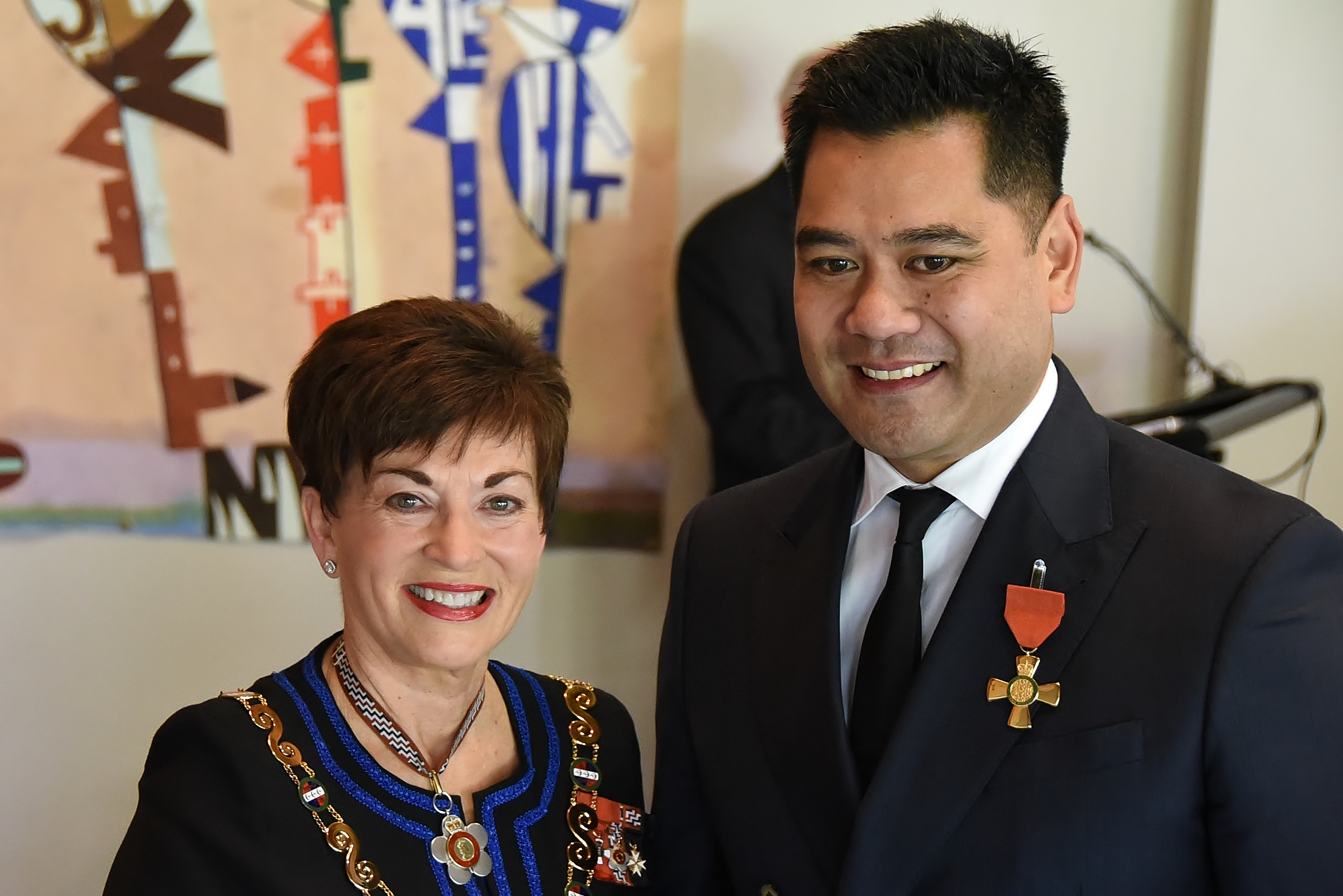
Ieremia with Dame Patsy Reddy, 2017

Neil Ieremia ONZM is a New Zealand choreographer. He is the founder of contemporary dance company, Black Grace. In 2016, he was appointed an Officer of the New Zealand Order of Merit for services to dance.

== Early years ==
Neil Ieremia was born and raised in Cannons Creek, Porirua, a working-class suburb north east of Wellington. He is of Samoan descent. At the age of six, Ieremia was struck with rheumatic fever which damaged his heart, and meant he could not play sports. Instead, he turned to dance. He choreographed his first group dance for a church youth concert aged 13.

Ieremia worked with a choreographic team that took part in the Commonwealth Games in Auckland in 1990. He was then invited to attend the Auckland Performing Arts School. At 19, with no formal dance training, Ieremia left his job working in a bank and moved to Auckland, where he experienced his first ballet and contemporary dance classes. In his final year at the Auckland Performing Arts School, Ieremia joined the acclaimed Douglas Wright Dance Company and performed in the major works Gloria, A Far Cry, Forever, How on Earth and Buried Venus. He subsequently worked with many of New Zealand's leading choreographers.

== Career ==
Ieremia founded his own company, Black Grace, in 1995, with ten male dancers of Pacific, Maori and New Zealand heritage. He draws from his Samoan and New Zealand roots to create dance works that reach across social, cultural and generational barriers. The work itself is highly physical, rich in the storytelling traditions of the South Pacific and expressed with raw finesse, unique beauty and power.

Ieremia's achievements as a New Zealand choreographer include sell-out performances at Jacob’s Pillow Dance Festival (USA debut 2004 and 2005), a four-week season on New York City’s 42nd Street, performances at the Cervantino Festival in Mexico, the John F. Kennedy Center for the Performing Arts, and the 2010 Cultural Olympiad in Vancouver.

Ieremia has choreographed work for the Royal New Zealand Ballet, the New Zealand Symphony Orchestra, Opera New Zealand, New Zealand Wearable Arts and the Holland Dance Festival.

In 2018 he authored a children's book, Elephantic, and founded and directed a free festival for Pacific artists, The Guerrilla Collection.

== Filmography ==
- 2005 From Cannon’s Creek to Jacob’s Pillow. Documentary - Aileen O'Sullivan and Toby Mills
- 2013 Mother Mother. Music Video - Fat Freddy’s Drop
- 2021 Elephantic. Dance film based on the book Elephantic written by Ieremia and illustrated by Pati Fuiava.
