= List of American art awards =

This list of American art awards covers some of the main art awards given by organizations in the United States. Some are restricted to Visual artists of the United States in a particular genre or from a given region, while others are broader in scope.

== Awards ==
Award	Sponsor	Notes
Herb Alpert Award in the Arts	California Institute of the Arts	Given annually in Art, Dance, Film/Video, Music, and Theater
American Academy of Arts and Letters Gold Medals	American Academy of Arts and Letters	Various categories
Anne Gould Hauberg Artist Images Award	University of Washington Libraries	A public lecture is given by the artist
Art Interview – International Online Artist Competition	Art Interview Online Magazine	
Art of the Can	Red Bull	
ArtPrize	ArtPrize non-profit organization	
Beck Gold Medal	Pennsylvania Academy of the Fine Arts	Best oil portrait by an American artist. Defunct 1969
Bennett Prize for Women Figurative Realists	The Pittsburgh Foundation	
Biennial of Hawaii Artists	Honolulu Museum of Art Spalding House	Hawaii artists
Blumenthal Prize	Franco-American Florence Blumenthal Foundation	
Bonnie Bronson Fellowship	Bonnie Bronson Fund	Named after American painter and sculptor Bonnie Bronson
Carnegie Art Award	Carnegie Investment Bank	
Carnegie Prize	Carnegie Museum of Art	
Catharine E. B. Cox Award for Excellence in the Visual Arts	Cox Family	For Hawaii artists. Named for Catharine Elizabeth Bean Cox
Charles Lang Freer Medal	Smithsonian Institution	
Chesley Awards	Association of Science Fiction and Fantasy Artists	Named after astronomical artist Chesley Bonestell
Clio Awards	Evolution Media	Advertising, design and communication
Cresson Traveling Scholarship	Pennsylvania Academy of the Fine Arts	
Cresta International Advertising Awards	Creative Standards International	Advertising
Factor Prize for Southern Art	Society 1858	now renamed the 1858 Prize for Contemporary Southern Art) (Society 1858)
Guggenheim International Award	Solomon R. Guggenheim Foundation	
The Homiens Art Prize	Homiens	
Hugo Award for Best Fan Artist	World Science Fiction Society	
Hugo Award for Best Professional Artist	World Science Fiction Society	
Hugo Boss Prize	Guggenheim Museum	
Hunting Art Prize	Hunting plc	
The Irish American Arts Awards	Irish Consulate General in New York	Defunct
Logan Medal of the Arts	Art Institute of Chicago; Society for Sanity in Art	Defunct
National Arts Awards	Americans for the Arts	
PBS Kids Writers Contest	PBS	
Ordway Prize	New Museum	
SECA Art Award	San Francisco Museum of Modern Art	
Mary Smith Prize	Pennsylvania Academy of the Fine Arts	
The Sheridan Prize for Art	The Sheridan Prize for Art	Given annually for the Visual Arts in the San Francisco Bay Area
Spectrum Award for Grand Master	Spectrum Fantastic Art	
Temple Gold Medal	Pennsylvania Academy of the Fine Arts	Defunct 1968
William E. Harmon Foundation Award	William E. Harmon Foundation	Defunct
Women's Caucus for Art Lifetime Achievement Award	Women's Caucus for Art	
World Fantasy Award—Artist	World Fantasy Convention	
Wynn Newhouse Award	Samuel J Newhouse Foundation	

== See also ==
- Lists of art awards
