= Biennial of Hawaii Artists =

Hawaiian artistic exhibition

- Genre: biennale, focus on visual art
- Begins: 1993
- Frequency: biennial, every two years.
- Locations: Honolulu, Hawaii
- Inaugurated: 1993

The Biennial of Hawaii Artists is an invitational exhibition of six or seven Hawaii artists that has been held at Spalding House since 1993. It was originally organized by The Contemporary Museum, Honolulu and known as “The Contemporary Museum Biennial of Hawaii Artists”. In 2011, The Contemporary Museum, Honolulu became part of the Honolulu Museum of Art, with the latter institution continuing the biennial.

== Participating ==
The following is a list of participating artists:

Biennial I (1993)

- Dorothy Faison
- David Graves
- Randy Hokushin
- Wayne Levin
- Dean Oshiro
- Esther Shimazu
- Masami Teraoka

Biennial II (1995)

- Arabella Ark
- Gaye Chan
- Sally French
- Don Ed Hardy
- Garnett Puett
- Frank Sheriff
- David Ulrich

Biennial III (1997)

- Donald Bernshouse
- Robert Hamada
- Renee Iijima
- Martin H. Peavy
- Franco Salmoiraghi
- Romolo Valencia

Biennial IV (1999)

- Margaret Ezekiel
- Nelson Flack
- Kapulani Landgraf
- R. Chiu Leong
- Mary Mitsuda
- Michael Tom

Biennial V (2001)

- Ben Kikuyama
- Hugh Russell
- Suzanne Saylor
- Masami Teraoka
- Kaori Ukaji
- Fae Yamaguchi

Biennial VI (2003)

- Ka’ili Chun
- Tom Lieber
- Wayne Morioka
- Deborah G. Nehmad
- Walter G. Nottingham
- Michael Takemoto

Biennial VII (2005)

- Charles Cohan
- Sergio Goes
- Claudia Johnson
- Michael Lee
- Jacqueline Rush Lee
- Michael Marshall
- Christopher Reiner

Biennial VIII (2008)

- Eli Baxter
- Vincent Goudreau
- Meidor Hu
- Javier Martinez
- Cade Roster
- Yida Wang
- Wayne Zebzda

Biennial IX (2010)

- Kloe Kang
- Scott Yoell
- Maika'i Tubbs
- Marc Thomas
- Abigail Romanchak
- Jason Teraoka
- Rosa Silver

Biennial X (2012)

- Mary Babcock
- Solomon Enos
- Jaisy Hanlon
- Jianjie Ji
- Sally Lundburg
- Bruna Stude
