= Mami (given name) =

- Pronunciation: Má-mí
- Gender: Female

Origin
- Origin: Japanese
- Meaning: It can have many different meanings depending on the kanji used.
- Region of origin: Japan

Other names
- Related names: Mamiko

Mami (まみ, マミ) is a feminine Japanese given name.

== Written forms ==
Mami can be written using different kanji characters and can mean:

- 真美, "true, beauty"
- 真実, "truth"
- 茉美, "jasmine, beauty"
- 麻実, "hemp, truth"
- 麻美, "hemp, beauty"
- 茉海, "jasmine, sea"
- 舞美, "dance, beauty"
- 麻弥, "hemp, complete"

The name can also be written in hiragana, まみ or katakana, マミ.

== People ==
- Mami Ayukawa (鮎川 麻弥; born 1961), Japanese singer
- Mami Deguchi (出口 茉美; born 1985), Japanese voice actress
- Mami Donoshiro (道城 まみ; born 1975), Japanese former professional tennis player
- Mami Higashiyama (東山 麻美; born 1977), Japanese actress and singer
- Mami Horikoshi (堀越 真己; born 1960), Japanese voice actress
- Mami Ishino (石野 真美; born 1983), Japanese track and field athlete
- Mami Kaneda (金田 真美; born 1968), Japanese former football player
- Mami Karino (狩野 真美; born 1996), Japanese field hockey player
- Mami Kataoka (片岡 真実; born 1965), Japanese art curator and writer
- Mami Kataoka (川田 まみ; born 1980), Japanese former pop singer and lyricist
- Mami Kingetsu (金月 真美; born 1965), Japanese voice actress and singer
- Mami Koyama (小山 茉美; born 1955), Japanese actress, voice actress and narrator
- Mami Koyama (basketball) (小山 真実; born 1995), Japanese professional basketball player
- Mami Kudo (工藤 真実; born 1964), Japanese ultramarathon runner
- Mami Matsuyama (松山 まみ; born 1988), Japanese idol, singer, and actress
- Mami Mizutori (水鳥 真美; born 1960), Japanese diplomat
- Mami Naito (内藤 真実; born 1986), Japanese badminton player
- Mami Nakamura (中村 麻美; born 1979), Japanese therapist and former actress
- Mami Nomura (野村 真美; born 1964), Japanese actress
- Mami Sasazaki (笹崎 まみ; born 1990), Japanese lead guitarist of SCANDAL
- Mami Ozaki (尾崎 真実; born 1982), Japanese voice actress and singer
- Mami Sekizuka (関塚 真美; born 1985), Japanese alpine skier
- Mami Shimamoto (嶋本 麻美; born 1987), Japanese weightlifter
- Mami Shindo-Honma (進藤-本間 真美; born 1975), Japanese biathlete
- Mami Tamura (たむら まみ; born 1976), Japanese politician
- Mami Tani (谷 真海; born 1982), Japanese paratriathlete and former long jumper
- Mami Uchiseto (内瀬戸 真実; born 1992), Japanese volleyball player
- Mami Ueno (上野 真実; born 1996), Japanese footballer
- Mami Umeki (梅木 真美; born 1994), Japanese judoka
- Mami Varte (born 1988), Mizo singer most notable in Northeast India
- Mami Watta (born 1998) Ivorian drag performer based in France
- Mami Yamaguchi (山口 麻美; born 1986), Japanese football coach and former player
- Mami Yamasaki (山崎 真実; born 1985), Japanese actress and former gravure idol
- Mami Yoshida (吉田 真未; born 1986), Japanese volleyball player

== Fictional characters ==
- Mami Inagaki, a character from Strike Witches
- Mami Kuroi, a character in the manga and anime series Hell Teacher Nūbē
- Mami Teramoto, a character from the English-language webcomic series Megatokyo
- Mami Hiyama, a character from the game and anime Little Battlers Experience W
- Mami Tomoe (巴 マミ), a character from Puella Magi Madoka Magica
- Mami Honda (本多マミ), a character from the manga Gals! and its anime adaption, Super GALS! Kotobuki Ran
- Mami Nanami (七海 麻美), a character from the manga and anime Rent-A-Girlfriend

== See also ==
- Esper Mami, a manga created by Fujiko F. Fujio in 1977
- Creamy Mami, the Magic Angel, a magical girl anime series
- Mami Wata, type of African spirit
