= Spalding House =

Former location for Honolulu Museum of Art that held exhibits for contemporary art

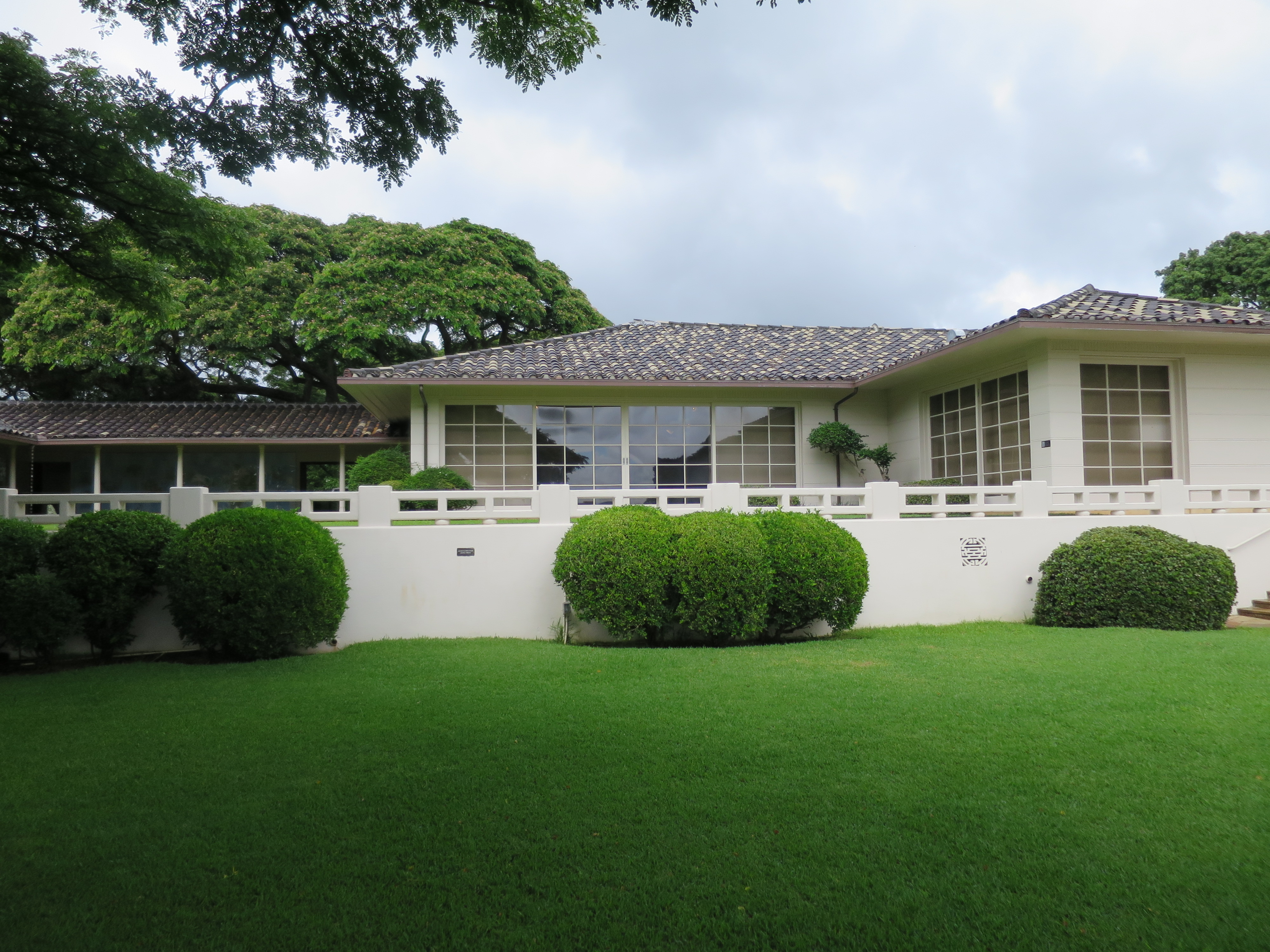
Spalding House, Honolulu, Hawaii

Spalding House, also known as the Cooke-Spalding House, was an art museum and sculpture garden in Honolulu, Hawaii (now closed). It was called Nuumealani (heavenly terrace) by Anna Rice Cooke, who commissioned it. The house and gardens constituted a 3 1/2-acre former art museum in the Makiki Heights district of Honolulu.

Spalding House was built as a residence in 1925 by Mrs. Cooke, the widow of Charles Montague Cooke, a local businessman and missionary descendant. At the same time, the Honolulu Academy of Art (later renamed Honolulu Museum of Art), which Mrs. Cooke endowed, was being built on the site of her former home on Beretania Street in Honolulu. The Makiki Heights home was designed by Hart Wood and later enlarged by the firm of Bertram Goodhue and Associates. In 1950, Cooke's daughter, Alice Spalding (Mrs. Phillip Spalding), engaged Vladimir Ossipoff to remodel the ground floor. The Honolulu Museum of Art acquired the estate as a bequest from Alice Spalding in 1968 and operated it as an annex for the display of Japanese prints from 1970 to 1978. In the late 1970s, it was sold to a subsidiary of The Honolulu Advertiser. In 1986, the Thurston Twigg-Smith family converted it to The Contemporary Museum. Following interior renovation, the museum, with its doors by artists Robert Graham and Tony Berlant, opened to the public in October 1988.

On May 2, 2011, The Contemporary Museum, Honolulu ceased to exist as an independent entity, and is now known as the Honolulu Museum of Art Spalding House. The Honolulu Academy of Art acquired Spalding House along with its collections of more than 3,000 works of art. The Makiki Heights building, which has about 5,000 square feet of gallery space, reassumed its former name, “Spalding House." Around that time the Honolulu Academy of Art rebranded itself Honolulu Museum of Art.

== The Milton Cades Pavilion ==
David Hockney designed stage sets for three one-act French operas presented at the Metropolitan Opera in 1981. He reconstructed these stage sets for a 1983 exhibition at the Walker Art Center, Hockney Paints the Stage. The three-dimensional set for Maurice Ravel's opera, L'enfant et les sortilèges (The Child and the Spells), was acquired for the 1988 opening of The Contemporary Museum, Honolulu, and was installed in the Milton Cades Pavilion on the grounds of Spalding House.

== Gardens ==
The surrounding gardens were originally landscaped between 1928 and 1941 as a Japanese stroll garden by Reverend K. H. Inagaki, a Christian minister of Japanese ancestry. In 1941, he traveled to Japan to visit relatives, and was never heard from again. From 1979 to 1980, the gardens were resuscitated by Honolulu landscape architect James C. Hubbard. During the 1990s, Kahaluʻu-based landscape architect Leland Miyano brought the gardens to their current state. While open as a museum, the grounds displayed sculpture by Satoru Abe, Charles Arnoldi, John Buck, Mark Bulwinkle, Deborah Butterfield, Gordon Chandler, Jedd Garet, Jun Kaneko, George Rickey, James Seawright, Toshiko Takaezu, Tom Wesselmann, and Arnold Zimmerman.

== Closure ==
The Honolulu Museum of Art announced in July 2019 that it would close its Spalding House location and put the property on the market. The site closed to the public in December 2019.
