= Hawaiʻi Contemporary =

Hawaiʻi arts organization

Hawaiʻi Contemporary (formerly Honolulu Biennial Foundation) is a non-profit organization dedicated to presenting contemporary art and ideas in Hawaiʻi.

== History ==
Hawaiʻi Contemporary was established as a 501(c)(3) non-profit arts organization in 2015 under the name Honolulu Biennial Foundation. It was founded by curators KJ Baysa and Isabella Ellaheh Hughes. In 2020, the organization moved to a triennial format and took its current name, Hawai‘i Contemporary. With this change, they initiated education programs throughout the year.

In Spring 2021, Hawaiʻi Contemporary was awarded an Andy Warhol Foundation Grant to support the Hawaiʻi Triennial 2022. Hawaiʻi Contemporary was the only organization in Hawaiʻi to be awarded in that year for the prestigious grant.

== Location ==
Hawaiʻi Contemporary is based in Honolulu, Hawa'i, and it frequently partners with local arts organizations to present contemporary art within a local cultural context. Recurring presenting partner institutions include: ʻIolani Palace, Hawaii State Art Museum, Honolulu Museum of Art, Bishop Museum, ʻAliʻiolani Hale, Foster Botanical Gardens, and Shangri La Museum of Islamic Art, Culture & Design.

== Events ==
=== Honolulu Biennial 2017 ===
The 2017 Biennial, titled Middle of Now | Here, was curated by Fumio Nanjo and Ngahiraka Mason and took place from March 8–May 8 of that year. Each of the previous biennial events welcomed over 100,000 guests from Hawai‘i, the Pacific region, and around the world. Artists included: Vernon Ah Kee, Sama Alshaibi, Alfredo and Isabel Aquilizan, Andrew Binkley, Drew Broderick, Jane Chang Mi, Kaili Chun, Sean Connelly, Beatrice Glow, Brett Graham, Marques Hanalei Marzan, Choi Jeong Hwa, Kathy Jetnil Kijiner, Mohammad Kazem, Yuki Kihara, Charlton Kūpa’a Hee, Yayoi Kusama, Al Lagunero, Alexander Lee, Les Filter Feeders, Mariquita Micki Davis, Lee Mingwei, Eko Nugroho, Fiona Pardington, Lisa Reihana, Chris Ritson, Michelle L. Schwengel-Regala, Greg Semu, teamLab, John Vea, Zhan Wang, Lynne Yamamoto, and Ken & Julia Yonetani.

=== Honolulu Biennial 2019 ===
The title of the 2019 Biennial, To Make Wrong / Right / Now, was taken from the poem Manifesto by participating Kanaka Maoli artist 'Imaikalani Kalahele. The 2019 Honolulu Biennial featured 47 artists based in and around the Pacific, and was curated by Nina Tonga, Josh Tengan (assistant curator), and Devon Bella (curatorial consultant). The Biennial focused on indigenous artists and local issues. Artists included: Pio Abad and Frances Wadsworth Jones, Bernice Akamine, DB Amorin, Brook Andrew, Ei Arakawa, James Bamba, Raymond Boisjoly, Bradley Capello, Central Pacific Time, Abraham Cruzvillegas, DAKOgamay, Demian DinéYazhi´, Solomon Enos, Nicholas Galanin, Andy Graydon, Taloi Havini, Hoʻoulu ʻĀina Artist Collective, ʻImaikalani Kalāhele, Florence Jaukae Kamel, Misaki Kawai, Lee Kit, Mat Kubo, Kapulani Landgraf, Chenta Laury, Ara Laylo, Jeremy Leatinu’u, Mario Lemafa, Ellen Lesperance, Janet Lilo, Mata Aho Collective, Leland Miyano, Marianne Nicolson, Paul Pfeiffer, Postcommodity, Rosanna Raymond, SaVAge K'lub, Natalie Robertson, Chiharu Shiota, Bruna Stude, Taupōuri Tangarō, Cory Taum, Maika’i Tubbs, Kalisolaite ‘Uhila, Marie Watt, Guan Xiao, Amy Yao, and Young-Had Chang Heavy Industries.

=== Virtual Art Summit 2021 ===
In February 2021, Hawaiʻi Contemporary hosted their first digital Art Summit, Pacific Century — E Ho‘omau no Moananuiākea. The Art Summit explored the same theme as the 2022 Triennial, and also highlighted some of the featured artists. Notable international speakers include Ai Weiwei, Theaster Gates, and Homi K. Bhabha.

=== Hawaiʻi Triennial 2022 ===
February 18–May 8, 2022 Hawaiʻi Contemporary will host the next Triennial, titled Pacific Century — E Hoʻomau no Moananuiākea. The Triennial is curated by Dr. Melissa Chiu, Dr. Miwako Tezuka, and Drew Kahuʻāina Broderick. Featured artists include Ai Weiwei (whose mask collection, The Way Follows Nature, was made specifically to benefit Hawai’i Triennial 2022), Theaster Gates, Sun Xun, and Liu Xiaodong, as well as Hawaiʻi-based artists Herman Piʻikea Clark and Jamaica Heolimeleikalani Osorio. "The show will focus on climate change, history, social activism, and indigenous knowledge about Hawaii in the context of Asia and Oceania."
