= Renaissance Society =

The Renaissance Society at the University of Chicago
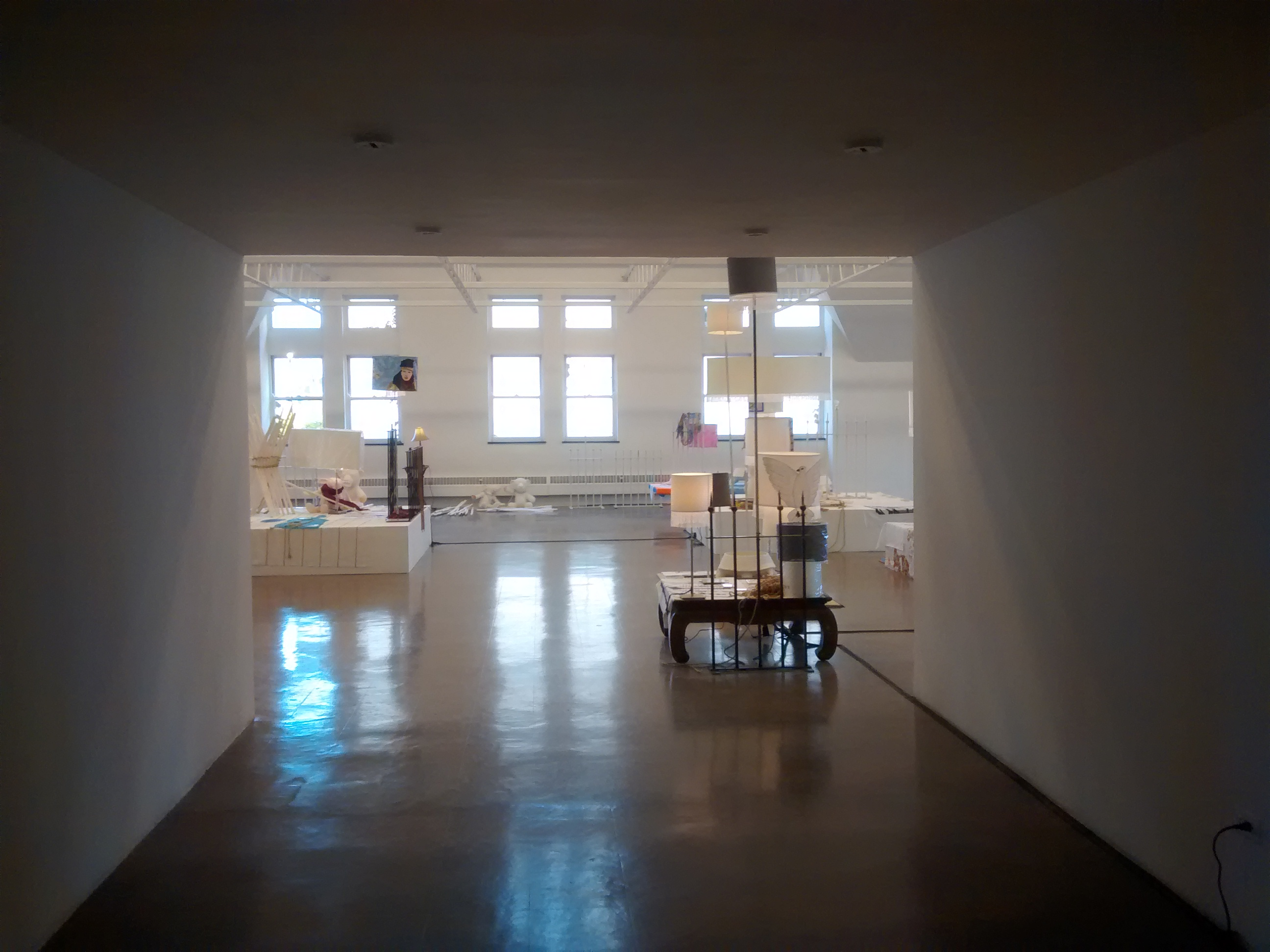
- Established: 1915
- Location: 5811 S. Ellis Ave. Chicago, IL 60637
- Coordinates: 41.7892°N 87.6010°W
- Type: Art museum
- Director: Myriam Ben Salah
- Website: http://www.renaissancesociety.org

The Renaissance Society, founded in 1915, is an independent contemporary art museum located on the campus of the University of Chicago, with a focus on the commissioning and production of new works by international artists. The kunsthalle-style institution typically presents four exhibitions each year, along with concerts, performances, screenings, readings, and lectures—all of which are free and open to the public. "The Ren" also produces publications in conjunction with many of its exhibitions.

== History ==
=== Early years ===
The Renaissance Society was founded in the wake of the Armory Show of 1913's contentious time in New York. Then called the International Exhibition of Modern Art, the show was met with outrage and incomprehension in New York, leading to a similarly fervent uproar when it traveled to Chicago. In the aftermath, it was clear that the city, and the American populace as a whole, were generally opposed to the post-impressionist, cubist, and futurist art that was presented.

The Society was founded shortly after in 1915. Member and secretary of the University of Chicago Board of Trustees, James Spencer Dickerson, felt it would be a nice to have particular portrait of poet Robert Browning in Harper Library, but there was no fund for such an acquisition. Consequently, he proposed an organization called “Friends of Art of the University of Chicago” which could provide said funding. On April 20, 1915, ten professors of the university convened at the Quadrangle Club in an exploratory meeting; and subsequently, a larger meeting was held on June 3 in Harper Assembly Hall of Cobb Hall to garner broader support for this organization. There, “a committee of five […] chaired by J. Laurence Laughlin, professor and head of the Department of Political Economy, was appointed to consider the organization of the art society and draft a constitution.” The president of the University approved and worked to assist in the establishment of the society. However, it was not until April 24, 1916, that the next formal meeting was held in the Classics Building. Twelve women and fourteen men voted to accept the constitution that was drafted by the committee. They then elected a president and an all-male executive committee. A further three women were added as vice presidents to rectify the gender imbalance.

The constitution ensured that the society would not become a collecting museum by stipulating that "all acquisitions of The Society, except money, shall become the property of the University of Chicago." The document stated the mission:

It shall be the aim of The Society to provide at the University such material means and personal influences as will contribute to the cultivation of the arts, and the enrichment of the life of the community.

The society would organize exhibitions, encourage gifts of art to the university, sponsor lectures on the arts, issue publications, and use other such means to accomplish its mission. Programming elements were open to the public (as is still the case now) in order to enrich the life of the community and the university.

=== Art in the first decade ===
The impetus behind the cultural renaissance in Chicago was the desire to improve society. For wealthy patrons, this aspiration drove philanthropy and the establishment of Chicago’s most preeminent cultural and educational institutions. Similarly, Renaissance Society academics wished to use their scholarly status to lead their community. Rather than take upon the duty of art education as non-professionals, they turned outward in the name of public service. The pervasive sense of idealism that underlies the Society undoubtedly excluded educating its community about modernism in its first decade of programming. The original tenets included a sense of morality to "uplift humanity, a prescription that honored the art of the past, particularly that of the Renaissance, as well as the rigid aesthetic dictates of academic realism." To the academics, the modernists were radical in promoting self-expression in art-making rather. Thus, the Society attacked the artists of the early twentieth-century avant-garde, "bringing to the University some of the most beautiful things in the world."

=== Transition ===
In 1927, Agnes C. Gale was elected president—the first woman and non-academic to hold this post. In the first of a five annual exhibitions of modern French paintings, Gale included pieces by Henri Matisse, Pablo Picasso, and Paul Gauguin, who were originally maligned by the Armory Show. The shows proved popular, marked by a jump in membership during Gale’s brief tenure. The Renaissance Society recruited the important photographer Eva Watson-Schütze in the late 1920s to be president of the organization. She was elected in 1929 to become the Society’s first full-time staff person as exhibition director. Schütze made clear her progressive intent: "Part of the program of The Renaissance Society is to stimulate study of the art of the present time, the new renaissance."

=== The 1930s ===
Throughout the 1920s, modernism was scarce in the city. Only a handful of exhibitions and few commercial galleries displayed avant-garde works. In the dearth of progressive leadership, The Arts Club, under the direction of Rue Winterbotham Carpenter, became the Midwest center for the examination of twentieth-century art. Schütze knew Carpenter and The Renaissance Society began to exchange programs with The Arts Club. In the 1930–31 season, the Club brought Fernand Léger to Chicago to screen his film Le Ballet Mecanique and subsequently lent it to the Society.

Under Schütze, The Renaissance Society expanded its curatorial programming into other art forms. The 1930 exhibition of modern American architecture was a pioneering example of a visual art institution investigating this art form. And In 1933, two film series were presented on campus: "Movies of Today and Yesterday" included D.W. Griffith’s The Birth of a Nation and The Brahms Symphony, and "foreign talking motion pictures" included four works by French director René Clair. The Society’s events also explored dance and music.

In the last years of Schütze’s leadership, curtailed by her failing health, the Society introduced Chicago’s audience to avant-garde art that was seldom or never before seen before in the United States. Among the most groundbreaking exhibitions at The Renaissance Society, a solo show presenting Alexander Calder’s early mobiles was his first in the country. However, it was James Johnson Sweeney who presented the Society’s boldest curatorial statements in his exhibition A Selection of Works by Twentieth-Century Artists. Non-representational works by seminal abstractionists—Jean Arp, Constantin Brâncuși, Alexander Calder, Juan Gris, Jean Hélion, Fernand Léger, Joan Miró, Piet Mondrian, and Pablo Picasso—were included in the comprehensive catalog of which much material had never before been exhibited in the country. Building on the founding principles of the Society, Schütze initiated a publishing program to expand the Society’s role as "an independent, experimental laboratory for search of legitimate meaning in art."

In her ultimate act as president of the Society, Schütze organized the 1936 exhibition of Léger, which she believed to be the institution's crowning achievement. The massive undertaking almost did not happen. In a feat of miscommunication, Léger had sent a costly, unauthorized, and uninsured shipment of works with collect on delivery to the Society in March 1935. Though Sweeney had met with Léger in Paris the summer prior and explained that Schütze had decided to hold a show for him, the exhibition date had not been set. Eva Watson Schütze died before the plans were complete. Eventually, the show would open at The Renaissance Society and then travel to the Museum of Modern Art, the Art Institute of Chicago, and the Milwaukee Art Institute, before Léger was regarded as one of the most important abstractionists of his generation. Included in the exhibition was The City—widely regarded as a revolutionary work from his mature period.

After Schütze’s tenure, the Renaissance Society continued to pioneer groundbreaking exhibitions in her footsteps. In the 1936-37 season, Paintings and Sculpture by American Negro Artists became the Society’s first show to prominently feature African-American artists. The next season, they showcased works by refugees from Europe in Paintings by Josef Albers and E. Misztrik de Monda. In 1939, László Moholy-Nagy, who had just moved to Chicago to direct The New Bauhaus (renamed the School of Design in Chicago, and then eventually the IIT Institute of Design), exhibited for the first time in America in the month-long show Paintings by László Moholy-Nagy. A decade later, another great Bauhaus figure, Ludwig Mies van der Rohe, who was then teaching at the Illinois Institute of Technology, was shown in an architecture exhibition at the Society. The following year, he personally installed an exhibition of Theo van Doesburg: Paintings, Drawings, Photographs, and Architectural Drawings.

=== War years through the 1960s ===
The war years proved to be a prolific period for the Society. From 1941 to 1962, artist Francis Strain Beisel was director of the Renaissance Society, which became the "preeminent site for exhibitions in the Chicago area in the 1940s and 1950s." In 1939, the Society held the Exhibition of Hand-Woven Textiles produced by the Federal Art Project of Milwaukee; in 1940, Book Illustrations by Modern American Artists; and three exhibitions in 1941: Fifteen American Sculptors and Contemporary American Lithographers, the conceptually pioneering show of American Humor: Cartoons from the Late Nineteenth Century to the Present, and Works by Chicago Artists Loaned by Chicago Collectors. In October 1944, a second exhibition of African-American artists was held, organized out of the Hampton Institute and featured several artists then serving in the military. A significant show during this period was War Art, which opened April 12, 1942. Locally organized, the exhibition particularly drew upon the School of Design’s interest in practical art that responded to the present emergency.

After the war, the Society did not exhibit New York artists who emerged in the late 1940s; instead, it showed Ben Shahn and I. Rice Pereira. The Society even ignored Pollock and de Kooning (who were already recognized as innovators) in its 1955 Eleven Pioneers of the Twentieth Century, opting instead to include William Glackens, Marsden Hartley, Robert Henri, John Sloan, and Maurice Prendergast. It was not until 1964 that Richard Lippold finally became the first New York artist to have a post-war solo exhibition at the Renaissance Society.

Lectures often accompanied exhibitions. Most notably in 1957, Marc Chagall gave his only American lecture. That same year, Leonard Bernstein, in his newly minted stardom, did not appear at his talk until the very last moment to a large crowd. The Society invited Frank Lloyd Wright—who was incredibly expensive—and Arnold Schoenberg among many others.

=== Conceptual art ===
Susanne Ghez assumed role of Director in 1974. During her tenure, the Renaissance Society shifted its focus to conceptual art. Beginning with its exhibition "Joseph Kosuth" in early 1976, the Society engaged in a discussion with contemporary art that rejected "traditional pictorial and sculptural definitions." In 1978, Lawrence Weiner’s eponymous show contrasted Kosuth’s approach by using language itself as material. Other artists exhibited during this period include Daniel Buren and John Knight. Exhibitions at the Renaissance Society in the 90s shifted from the larger institutional critique that dominated the 70s and 80s to more inward contemplation through site-specificity. In 1990, both Michael Asher and Niele Toroni exhibited in solo shows. The following year, Jessica Stockholder opened the season with Skin Toned Garden Mapping. Some significant artists who showed at the Renaissance Society in the 1990s include Felix Gonzalez-Torres (1994), Kara Walker (1997), Kerry James Marshall (1998), and Raymond Pettibon (1998).

The Renaissance Society inaugurated the 21st century with Thomas Hirschhorn: World Airport. In 2004, Laura Letinsky: Hardly More Than Ever, Photographs 1997–2004 reinterpreted the traditional male gaze of still life paintings, using the ideas of domesticity and the camera lens to explore intimate, often overlooked moments. In 2008, Black Is, Black Ain’t explored a shift in the rhetoric of race and identity, exhibiting 26 black and non-black artists. After 40 years as Executive Director and Chief Curator of the Renaissance Society, Ghez ended her tenure in 2013 her final show William Pope.L: Forlesen. Pope.L’s new installation explored the demarcation of differences politically, economically, socially, and culturally. This show underscored Ghez’s commitment to refocusing the Society around Schütze’s mission in becoming a laboratory for new art and ideas. Under her leadership the Renaissance Society developed an international distinction for its ground-breaking curatorial programming.

=== Today at the Ren ===
Solveig Øvstebø assumed Ghez’s position as Director of the Society in 2013. Previously at Bergen Kunsthall Norway, Øvstebø has since overseen the curatorial efforts at the Society. With a renewed focus on commissioning new works, allowing artists to a have a space where they are able to create works not possible in more traditional art spaces, the Renaissance Society has been programming exhibitions, lectures, performances, and other formats.

In 2015, the Society celebrated its centennial. Matthias Poledna removed the overhead truss grid that had defined the gallery space, giving future artists more spatial freedom than in previous decades.

Hamza Walker was Associate Curator and Director of Education from 1994 to 2016. He has been called by The New York Times one of the "seven most influential curators in the country", as well as "one of the museum world's most talented essayists." Walker won the Ordway Prize in 2010, in recognition of his innovative curatorial work and his wide-ranging thinking and writing about contemporary art.

In February 2019, the Renaissance Society announced a $1 million gift from the Mansueto Foundation in support of its publications program. This gift secures the institution's publishing activities for 10 years and marks the largest single commitment in its history.

In April 2020 it was announced that Myriam Ben Salah would become the next executive director and chief curator of the Renaissance Society.

== Separation from the University ==
Having been established by professors as a part of the University of Chicago community, the Renaissance Society has always had its roots in the academic community. Formally, the institution is The Renaissance Society ‘at’ the University of Chicago, highlighting its unique autonomy as a separate entity. In 1974, after operating under deficit debts financed by the University, the Renaissance Society was cut off financially. The University erased its debt and let the Society remain in the space rent-free; however, all financial help and benefits were rescinded. As a result, the Society became an independent non-collecting museum located on the campus.
