= Lee Mingwei =

American contemporary visual artist (born 1964)

- 李明維
- Born: 1964 (age 60–61); Taipei, Taiwan
- Other names: Mingwei Lee
- Education: California College of the Arts (BFA), Yale University (MFA)
- Occupation: Visual artist
- Known for: Participatory installations
- Movement: Contemporary art, conceptual art

Lee Mingwei (Chinese: 李明維; born 1964) is a Taiwanese-born American contemporary visual artist. He creates participatory installations, where strangers can explore issues of trust, intimacy, and self-awareness, and one-on-one events, in which visitors contemplate these issues with the artist through eating, sleeping, walking and conversation. Lee's projects are often open-ended scenarios for everyday interaction, and take on different forms with the involvement of participants and change during the course of an exhibition. He has had solo exhibitions in museums worldwide including The Metropolitan Museum of Art in New York City, Mori Art Museum in Tokyo, and Centre Pompidou in Paris.

Mingwei's mid-career survey exhibition "Lee Mingwei and His Relations" (2014–2016) was conceived by the Mori Art Museum in 2014, and traveled to Taipei Fine Arts Museum (2015) and Auckland Art Gallery Toi o Tāmaki (2016), with a European survey exhibition "Lee Mingwei: Li, Gifts and Rituals" at Gropius Bau (2020), which then traveled to Museum Villa Stuck (2021). He has participated at "Viva Arte Viva," The 57th International Art Exhibition - La Biennale di Venezia, curated by Christine Macel, and has been featured in biennials in Venice, Lyon, Liverpool, Taipei, Sydney, Whitney, Shanghai, and Sharjah and Asia Pacific Triennials.

== Early life and education ==
Lee Mingwei was born in 1964, in Taipei, Taiwan. He was raised as a Chan Buddhist, and spent his summers in a monastery.

In 1993, Lee received a Bachelor of Fine Arts (B.F.A.) degree in textiles from the California College of the Arts, where two professors in particular, Mark Thompson and Suzanne Lucy, expanded his understanding of art. In 1997, Lee earned a Master of Fine Arts (M.F.A.) in sculpture from Yale University.

== Work ==
Lee's work focuses on the formation and contemplation of human relationships. His pieces typically involve situations that invite participants to reflect upon on their connections with others, or prompt them to create new connections with strangers. His work is often linked to Relational Aesthetics, a term coined by French art critic Nicolas Bourriaud to denote art that creates situations or environments that invite viewer engagement. Curators and writers have also contextualized such themes within Lee's work by referencing American artists Allan Kaprow and John Cage, who created work dealing with an audience's relationship to its environment. For his survey exhibitions, Mami Kataoka further proposes an Eastern context of connection and interconnectivity in association with Lee's work, while Stephanie Rosenthal and Clare Molloy would elaborate on the idea of "Li" (禮) and gift aspect of his work.

=== Everyday activities ===
Lee's work also focuses on daily life, and involves staging everyday activities such as sleeping and eating within the museum space. For The Sleeping Project (2000–present) Lee or a host from the museum stages the act of "sleeping with" by placing two beds and several nightstands within the museum. For each of the days, museum visitors are selected through lottery to spend a night in the museum sleeping in one of two beds alongside their host. Participants are asked to bring objects from the space where they usually sleep, and the following morning they are to leave the objects on one of the surrounding nightstands. The objects remain on the nightstands for the duration of the exhibition. Later iterations of the piece have involved two strangers sleeping in the beds, rather than Lee. In a similar work, The Dining Project (1997–present), Lee or a host from the museum cooks and serves a visitor a meal that they then share together within the museum.

=== Family stories ===
Many of his works draw from childhood experiences and memories of his family. For 100 Days with Lily (1995) Lee draws from his time mourning the loss of his grandmother by chronicling his experience spending 100 days with a narcissus from planting, to its growth, and eventually to its death and his mourning of the flower. He documents this experience in a series of photographs, onto which he superimposes lines of text marking one moment from each of the hundred days with the flower. The passing of his grandmother also inspired The Letter Writing Project (1998–present) in which participants write letters to someone expressing something they wish they had expressed before. Participants leave their letters within wooden booths Lee created for participants to write inside. If the participants mark the recipient's address, the museum mails out the letters, and retains the ones without addresses.

=== The concept of gift ===
Lee also explores the concept of the gift in his work, drawing particular inspiration from Lewis Hyde’s book The Gift: Creativity and the Artist in the Modern World. In 2009, for La Biennale de Lyon, Lee created The Moving Garden (2009 - present), a piece consisting of a granite slab from which visitors may take flowers. The visitors are then meant to bring the flower out of the museum, diverge from the path they would normally take, and along the way give the flower to a stranger.

In The Mending Project (2009 - present), a mender is seated at a long table with two chairs against a wall of colorful spools of thread. Participants are invited to bring in something they would like to have mended or embellished, while they sit across from the mender and talk. After the mending, the visitors can then choose to take away their garment, or leave it at the gallery so that it may be attached to the spools on the wall, and return to collect it at the conclusion of the exhibition.

In Sonic Blossom (2013 - present), participants are gifted a song. Classical singers approach a single museum-goer and ask if they would like to receive a gift. If the participant agrees, the singer leads them to a seat and begins to perform one of Franz Schubert’s Lieder. Lee was inspired to create the piece while helping his mother to recover from surgery, during which time the two would listen to Schubert’s Lieder. The presentation of Sonic Blossom at The Metropolitan Museum of Art was selected as “The Best Classical Music of 2015” and “The Best in Art of 2015” in the New York Times.

== Survey exhibitions ==
=== Lee Mingwei and His Relations: The Art of Participation (2014) ===
In 2014, the Mori Art Museum held a mid-career survey exhibition of Lee's work titled "Lee Mingwei and His Relations: The Art of Participation." The show was curated by Mami Kataoka, Mori's Chief Curator, and included a survey of Lee's work spanning 20 years, as well as work by other artists such as Yves Klein, John Cage, Allan Kaprow, and Rirkrit Tiravanija to contextualize Lee's practice.

Kataoka highlighted the relevance of Lee's work in light of the 2011 Tōhoku earthquake and tsunami as well as the importance of holding such an exhibition in Japan:

“In Japan today, with all of its loss, Lee Mingwei’s efforts have released similarly positive energy towards rebuilding relationally and bringing connectedness into our awareness. While they also mean embracing an awareness of loss, the special experiences Lee creates call strongly on our senses and emotions and help us take our first steps toward becoming conscious of new relationality.”

Following its run in the Mori Art Museum, in 2015 Lee's survey show traveled to the Taipei Fine Arts Museum, and subsequently to the Auckland Art Gallery Toi o Tāmaki in 2016.

=== Li (禮), Gifts and Rituals (2020) ===
In 2020, Gropius Bau organized a survey show titled "Lee Mingwei: 禮 Li, Gifts and Rituals," curated by Director Stephanie Rosenthal and Assistant Curator Clare Molloy. The survey would propose that the artist's practice is concerned with rituals of giving, receiving and care, and an exploration of art's potential to be a transformative gift:

"I see my works also in this way: sharing the gift of a song, the gift of contemplation or the gift of exchange with a stranger" -- Lee Mingwei

The opening was delayed due to the global COVID-19 pandemic, but Lee would develop new works Invitation for Dawn (2020) and Letter to Oneself (2020), inspired by Sonic Blossom and The Letter Writing Project respectively. Drawing on the participatory work Sonic Blossom, and giving and receiving something as ephemeral and intimate as a song, Invitation for Dawn virtually brought together a classically trained opera singer and participant on Zoom, with the singer performing a capella and gifting a song to their guest. Each singer had chosen a repertoire of three songs, which signal for them an "invitation for dawn," forming a sign of hope in the ongoing moment of global crisis. Following the opening, Invitation for Dawn continued to take place online as part of the exhibition until its conclusion.

Letter to Oneself invited the public to write letters to themselves, dealing with the questions: What is the current situation like for you? What worries you the most? What gives you hope? And asked participants to send their letters to Gropius Bau until 22 May 2020, selected letters were then read by actors Sithembile Mench and Marie Schuppan and included on the museum website.

Following its run at the Gropius Bau, in 2021 Lee's survey exhibition traveled to the Museum Villa Stuck, Director Michael Buhrs and curator Anne Marr speaking about the exhibition noted:

"[...] it is worth seeing the exhibition from the viewer's point of view, because at the center of Lee Mingwei's works are, in fact, the viewers themselves. It is very personal experiences of the artist that inspire the works in the exhibition, and it is new, very personal experiences of their own which visitors leave the museum. [...] Lee's works are a challenge for visitors as well as for the institutions that present his works. Into this challenge, however, the artist injects such a great deal of empathy, respect and open-mindedness that participation and engagement are activated in a very natural way. "Lee Mingwei: 禮 Li, Gifts and Rituals is indeed a gift, to all of us, which we at the Museum Villa Stuck accept with joy, in order to pass it on to our visitors."

== Personal life ==
Mingwei lives between Paris, Taipei, and New York City.

== Solo exhibitions ==
- Lee Mingwei: Rituals of Care, de Young Museum, San Francisco, 2024
- Lee Mingwei: Our Labyrinth, Tate Modern, London, 2022
- Lee Mingwei: Li, Gifts and Rituals, Museum Villa Stuck, Munich, 2021
- MO-Kunstpreis 2021: Lee Mingwei, Museum Ostwall im Dortmunder U, Dortmund, 2021
- Lee Mingwei: Sonic Blossom, Ateneum Art Museum, Helsinki, 2021
- Lee Mingwei and Bill T. Jones: Our Labyrinth, The Metropolitan Museum of Art, New York, 2020
- Lee Mingwei: Li, Gifts and Rituals, Gropius Bau, Berlin, 2020
- Sonic Blossom, Art Gallery of South Australia, Adelaide, 2019
- Lee Mingwei: The Tourist, Perrotin Tokyo, Japan, 2019
- Lee Mingwei: Sonic Blossom, Cleveland Museum of Art, Ohio, 2019
- Lee Mingwei: You Are Not a Stranger, Museum of Contemporary Art Cleveland, Ohio, 2019
- Lee Mingwei: Seven Stories, Museum MACAN, Jakarta, 2018
- Sonic Blossom, Centre Pompidou, Paris, 2018
- Lee Mingwei: Stone Journey, Worcester Art Museum, Massachusetts, 2018
- Sonic Blossom, National Portrait Gallery, Washington D.C., 2018
- Lee Mingwei and His Relations: The Art of Participation, Auckland Art Gallery Toi o Tāmaki, Auckland, New Zealand, 2016
- The Moving Garden, National Gallery of Victoria, Melbourne, Australia, 2016
- Between Going and Staying, Centre for Chinese Contemporary Art, Manchester, UK, 2016
- Sonic Blossom, The Metropolitan Museum of Art, New York, 2015
- Lee Mingwei and His Relations: The Art of Participation, Taipei Fine Arts Museum, Taipei, Taiwan, 2015
- Lee Mingwei: Sonic Blossom, Museum of Fine Arts, Boston, Massachusetts, 2015
- Lee Mingwei and His Relations: The Art of Participation, Mori Art Museum, Tokyo, Japan, 2014
- Lee Mingwei: Sonic Blossom, Ullens Center for Contemporary Art, Beijing, China, 2014
- A Quartet and A Living Room, Chinese Arts Centre, Manchester, UK, 2013
- Luminous Depths, Peranakan Museum, Singapore, 2013
- The Living Room, Isabella Stewart Gardner Museum, Boston, Massachusetts, 2012
- Visible, Elusive, Shiseido Gallery, Tokyo, Japan, 2012
- Tales of Flower and Stones, Espace Louis Vuitton, Taipei, Taiwan, 2012
- The Moving Garden, Brooklyn Museum, New York, 2011
- The Travelers, Museum of Chinese in America, New York, 2011
- Trilogy of Sounds, Mount Stuart, Scotland, UK, 2010
- Pantheon Project, Museum Contemporary Baltimore, Maryland, 2010
- Guernica in Sand, Queensland Gallery of Modern Art, Brisbane, Australia, 2008
- Bodhi Tree Project, Queensland Gallery of Modern Art, Brisbane, Australia, 2008
- Uncommon Senses, Govett Brewster Art Gallery, New Plymouth, New Zealand, 2008
- Lee Mingwei: Impermanence, Chicago Cultural Center, Illinois, 2007
- Duologue, Museum of Contemporary Art Taipei, Taiwan, 2007
- Pantheon Project, Neuberger Museum of Art, New York, 2006
- Through Masters’ Eyes, Museum für Ostaslatische Kunst, Cologne, Germany, 2005
- Through Masters’ Eyes, Los Angeles County Museum of Art, Los Angeles, California, 2004
- The Tourist, Museum of Modern Art, New York, 2003
- Harvard Seers Project, Harvard University OFA, Cambridge, Massachusetts, 2003
- The Living Room Project, Isabelle Stewart Gardner Museum, Boston, Massachusetts, 2000
- Empathic Economies, Ft. Lauderdale Museum of Art, Florida, 2000
- Lee Mingwei 1994 to 1999, Cleveland Center for Contemporary Art, Cleveland, Ohio, 1999
- Way Stations, Whitney Museum of American Art, New York, 1998
- The Letter Writing Project, The Fabric Workshop and Museum, Philadelphia, Pennsylvania, 1998

== Biennials ==
- Leaving the Echo Chamber, Sharjah Biennial 14, Sharjah, UAE, 2019
- Lee Mingwei: Seven Stories, 14th Edition of Biennale de Lyon, Bullukian Foundation, Lyon, France, 2017
- Viva Arte Viva, 57th International Art Exhibition – La Biennale di Venezia, Venice, Italy, 2017
- Middle of Now | Where, Honolulu Biennial 2017, Honolulu, Hawaii, 2017
- Why Not Ask Again?, 11th Shanghai Biennale, Power Station of Art, Shanghai, China, 2016
- The Future is Already Here, It’s Just Not Evenly Distributed, 20th Biennale of Sydney, Australia, 2016
- Little Water, Dojima River Biennale, Dojima River Forum, Osaka, Japan, 2013
- All Our Relations, 18th Biennial of Sydney, Sydney, Australia, 2012
- Accidental Message: Art is Not a System, Not a World, Shenzhen Sculpture Biennial, Shenzhen, China, 2012
- Re:Thinking Trade, Liverpool Biennial 2010, UK, 2010
- The Spectacle of the Everyday, Lyon Biennial 2009, Lyon, France, 2009
- Asian Art Biennial, National Taiwan Museum of Fine Arts, Taiwan, 2007
- Echigo-Tsumari Art Triennial 2006, Niigata, Japan, 2006
- International 06, Liverpool Biennial 2006, Tate Liverpool, UK, 2006
- Whitney Biennial 2004, Whitney Museum of American Art, New York, 2004
- Limbo Zone, Venice Biennale, Taiwan Pavilion, Italy, 2003
- The Sky is the Limit, 2000 Taipei Biennial, Taipei Fine Arts Museum, Taiwan
- The Third Asia Pacific Triennial of Contemporary Art, Queensland Art Gallery, Brisbane, Australia, 1999
