= Seawright =

Seawright is a surname. Notable people with the surname include:

- George Seawright (c. 1951–1987), Unionist politician in Northern Ireland
- James Seawright (born 1936), modernist American sculptor
- Jonas Seawright (born 1982), American football player
- Paul Seawright (born 1965), Irish artist
- Roy Seawright (1905−1991), American special effects artist
- Toni Seawright (born 1964), American actress and singer-songwriter
