= Liza Ryan =

American photographer (born 1965)

- Education: Dartmouth College, California State University, Fullerton
- Known for: Photography, Video, and Mixed Media

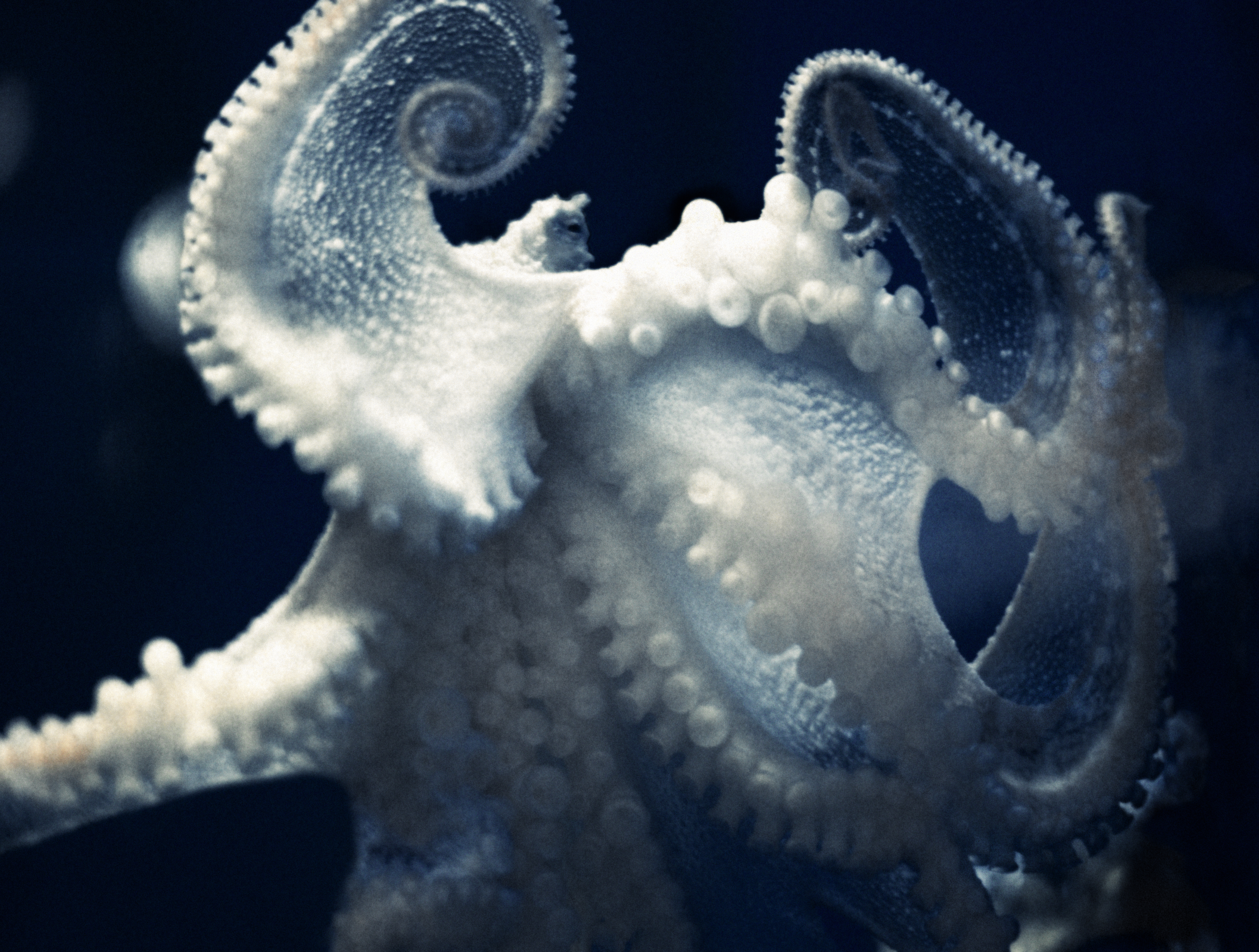
Celestial Darwin, Liza Ryan, 2022

Liza Ryan (born 1965) is an American contemporary artist living in Los Angeles, CA. Her work is held in the collections of the J. Paul Getty Museum, Los Angeles County Museum of Art among others.

== Background and Education ==
Ryan earned a BA in English Literature at Dartmouth College (New Hampshire), attended the San Francisco Art Institute and received an MFA in photography from California State University, Fullerton.

== Work ==
Liza Ryan’s decades-long artistic practice utilizes photography, painting, video and mixed media to examine hierarchical power structures inherent to western culture. Her work often presents a symbiotic relationship between the human and natural worlds, supporting her convictions about interspecies solidarity.

Ryan integrates readings in ecology, biology, feminism and fantasy into her practice. The merging of these interests fuels Ryan’s process of combining disparate elements. The introduction of the artist’s hand to the photograph highlights the distinctive properties of her subjects. The mark-making is also symbolic of the care the artist has for her subjects and may be found in the form of a line highlighting the winding curve of an animal or the faintness of a horizon line.

== Exhibitions ==
=== Selected Solo Exhibitions ===
- Antarctica, Kayne Griffin Corcoran, Los Angeles, CA (2018).
- Wind(shield), Kayne Griffin Corcoran, Los Angeles, CA (2015).
- Rare Bloom, Kayne Griffin Corcoran, Santa Monica, CA (2012).
- Liza Ryan: Fragment, Eleanor D. Wilson Museum at Hollins University, Roanoke, VA (March 8 – April 21, 2012) (cat.)
- Exploded Moment, William Griffin Gallery, Santa Monica, CA (2010).
- Spill, Cooley Memorial Art Gallery, Reed College, Portland, OR (January 30 – March 8, 2009) (cat.)
- New Work: Video and Photographs, William Griffin Gallery, Santa Monica, CA (2008).
- Motion Pictures, William Griffin Gallery, Santa Monica, CA (2007).
- Fluid, William Griffin Gallery, Santa Monica, CA (2006).
- G-C Arts, Las Vegas, NV (2006).
- Liza Ryan, William Griffin Gallery, Santa Monica, CA (2004).
- Surface, William Griffin Gallery, Santa Monica, CA (2003).
- Weight of Light, Herter Gallery, University of Massachusetts Fine Arts Center, Amherst, MA (2001).
- Rena Bransten Gallery, San Francisco, CA (2001).

=== Selected Group Exhibitions ===
- The Creator Has A Master Plan, Diane Rosenstein Gallery, Los Angeles, CA (2020)
- Yola Día Music Festival ACLU Flag Project, Los Angeles, CA (2019)
- Book Club: Going Native, Durden and Ray, Los Angeles, CA (2017)
- Recent Acquisitions in Focus: Latent Narratives, Getty Museum, Los Angeles, CA (2016)
- Beauty and the Beast: The Animal in Photography, Museum of Photographic Arts, San Diego, CA (2016)
- This Side of the 405, Ben Maltz Gallery, OTIS, Los Angeles, CA (2013)
- Tapping the Third Realm, Ben Maltz Gallery, OTIS, Los Angeles, CA (2013)
- State of Mind: A California Invitational, Museum of Photographic Arts, San Diego, California (2010)
- Zones of Contact, Biennale of Sydney, Australia (2006)
- Weather, William Griffin Gallery, Santa Monica, CA (2005)
- Contemporary Photography from The Manfred Heiting Collection, The Museum of Fine Arts, Houston, TX (2003)
- New Acquisitions/New Work/New Directions 3: Contemporary Selections, Los Angeles County Museum of Art, Los Angeles, CA (2002)
- The NSM Vie Foundation and the MEP: Supporting Young Photography, Soobin Art Gallery, Singapore (2001)
- Amerika-Europa, Ein Kunslerischer Dialog, Von der Heydt-Museum, Wuppertal, Germany
- Portretten & Stillevens: Rijksmuseum, Amsterdam, Netherlands (2001)
- Double Visions: Photographs from the Strauss Collection, University Art Museum, California State University, Long Beach, CA (2001)
- Inhabiting, Galerie Lelong, New York, NY (2000)
- California Invitational, Ansel Adams Center for Photography, San Francisco, CA (2000)
- California Invitational, University Art Museum, California State University, Long Beach, CA (2000)
- TCM at 12: Recent Acquisitions, The Contemporary Museum, Honolulu, HI (2000)
- Summer Group Exhibition, Galerie Lelong, New York, NY (2000)
- Self/Developed, Eyre/Moore Gallery, Seattle, WA (2000)
- Domestic Pleasures, Galerie Lelong, New York, NY (1999)
- Threshold and Domestic Space, Kohler Arts Center, Sheboygan, WI (1999)
- Threshold and Domestic Space, Contemporary Art Center of Virginia, Virginia Beach, VA (1999)
- Body/Language, SF Camerawork, San Francisco, CA (1999)
- Sig-alert, Arizona State University Art Museum, Tempe, AZ (1999)

== Selected works ==
=== THE UNREAL REAL, 2018 ===
A recent series, The Unreal Real, emerged from the artist’s 2016 trip to Antarctica where she had the opportunity to explore the South Pole alongside a group of esteemed scientists and ecologists. Their interactions combined with her physical immersion into the environment activated a profound inner recalibration, as she witnessed Antarctica come alive. As a result of this experience, Ryan became committed to protecting vulnerable places and life forms, ultimately shifting the primary focus of her practice from exploring the nuances of the human condition to a deep examination of current issues through subjects that have resonance beyond their literal representation.

Using pencil, charcoal, gouache and paint, she made subtle interventions on the pictures, sometimes drawing mirror images of the ice formations, other times intensifying shading or deepening the colour of the sky. “Tracing became a form of going back there,” Ryan says. “Something about the tactile nature of following the line, the connection of the pencil to the paper, you lose yourself. It’s easier to remember.

=== OCTOPUS WORK, Current ===
Ryan carried her findings from Antarctica over to her current body of work which focuses on the octopus, as subject and the vehicle through which to examine prejudice and privilege. She was drawn to this particular cephalopod because octopuses possess extremely advanced cognitive abilities yet share little in common physically with humans and other mammals, making them the ultimate intelligent “other”. Although it has been proven that octopuses feel pain, have distinct personalities, retain memory, problem solve, and use tools, their classification as an invertebrate deems them unworthy of ethical treatment or any sort of legal protection when being studied in laboratories or being prepared for human consumption.

Ryan’s fieldwork began by interacting with octopuses and scientists in aquariums and labs around the country. While working with octopuses the artist observed: “Octopuses change color, shape and texture, they stare at you and study your movements with curiosity and intelligence, they move with fluid, hypnotic grace. Eight arms, all containing neurons, and possibly independent thinking, snake around seemingly of their own volition. They are silent.”

== Publications ==
- Robb Report: Escape Plans, 2022.
- Ice Culture. Black Coffee & Vinyl Presents, 2019. Writing with Willona M. Sloan.
- The Unreal Real: Liza Ryan. Monograph published by Steidl and The Institute of Art Research, 2018. Writings by Sarah Lehrer-Graiwer, Holly Meyers, Hanna Heiting
- Liza Ryan: Fragment. Curated by Amy G.Moorfield, Director. Eleanor D. Wilson Museum at Hollins University, 2012.
- Liza Ryan, Spill. Portland, OR: Reed Institute, 2009. Stephanie Snyder.
- Liza Ryan, Zones of Contact: 2006 Biennale of Sydney. Exhibition Catalogue, 2006. Andrew Schulz.
- Liza Ryan, Griffin, 2005. Interview with Genevieve Day.
- Double Vision: Photographs from the Strauss Collection. Exhibition Catalogue. Essays by Constance W. Glenn, Mary-Kay Lombino, and Arthur Ollman. Long Beach: University Art Museum, California State University, College of the Arts, 2001.
- Portretten & Stillevens: Photographs from the Manfred Heiting Collection. Amsterdam: Waanders Uitgevers/Rijksmuseum, 2001
- Liza Ryan: Works 1993–2000. Cinubia, 2000. With an essay by Charles Merewether.
- Degrees of Stillness: Photographs from the Manfred Heiting Collection. Exhibition catalogue. Essay by Susanne Lange. Koln: Stiftung Kulture, 1999
- Liza Ryan: The Effect of Surface Wind Speed on Familiar Objects. Venice, CA: Griffin, 1997. Mina Ryan.

== Collections ==
The J. Paul Getty Museum, Los Angeles, CA

The Los Angeles County Museum of Art, Los Angeles, CA

San Francisco Museum of Modern Art, San Francisco, CA

The Museum of Fine Arts, Houston, TX

Maison Européenne de la Photographie, Paris, France

Museum of Photographic Arts, San Diego, CA

The Rosenkrantz Foundation, Berlin, Germany

The Contemporary Museum, Honolulu, HI

Hood Museum of Art, Dartmouth College, Hanover, NH

== Sources ==
- Liza Ryan: Spill. Interview with the artist and essay by Stephanie Snyder, Douglas F. Cooley Memorial Art Gallery, Reed College, Portland, Oregon, 2010
- John Motley, “Imagining Transcendence: Liza Ryan’s installation SPILL explores symbols of possibility and Limitation,” The Portland Mercury, February 19, 2009
- Sebastian Smee, “Uncomfortably Close,” The Weekend Australian, June 24, 2006
