= Wright Elemakule Bowman Sr. =

American Hawaiian woodworker, traditional canoe builder (1907–2003)

- Born: Wright Elemakule Bowman; November 5, 1907; Hilo, Hawaii, Territory of Hawaii
- Died: December 30, 2003 (aged 96); Honolulu, Hawaii, U.S.
- Spouse: Elizabeth Whittington (m. 1938)
- Children: 3

Wright Elemakule Bowman Sr. (November 5, 1907 – December 30, 2003) was an American Hawaiian master woodworker, traditional Hawaiian canoe builder, and educator.

== Early life and family ==
Wright Elemakule Bowman was born on November 5, 1907, in Hilo, Territory of Hawaii (now United States). His parents were Mary Mele Elemakule Pa (1879–1911), and Donald Scott Bowman (1878–1957), the chief sanitation inspector. He was part Native Hawaiian, and his mother's family were from Hilo.

== Career ==
Bowman graduated from Kamehameha School for Boys in 1928, and attended the General Electric Apprenticeship Program for machine pattern makers.

He taught woodworking at the Kamehameha Schools for 23 years, and trained multiple generations of woodworkers on the islands. His former students include woodcarver Keola Sequeira, and fine artist Kaili Chun, who was also his apprentice.

Bowman focused on revitalizing Hawaiian culture. He built reproductions of historical Hawaiian furniture, paddles, canoes, digging sticks and bowls. Bowman was a member of the Polynesian Voyaging Society, and in the early 1970s he built the ash wood hull crossbars for the Hōkūleʻa (1975), a double-hulled voyaging canoe.

Bowman was named as one of the Living Treasures of Hawaii in 1977 by the Buddhist temple Honpa Hongwanji Mission of Hawaii. In 2002, he was honored by Duke's Canoe Club at the Ala Wai Challenge canoe race.

His son Wright "Wrighto" Bowman Jr. (1943–1997), studied under him and was also a master woodcarver and canoe builder.
