= Julian Hooper =

New Zealand artist (born 1966)

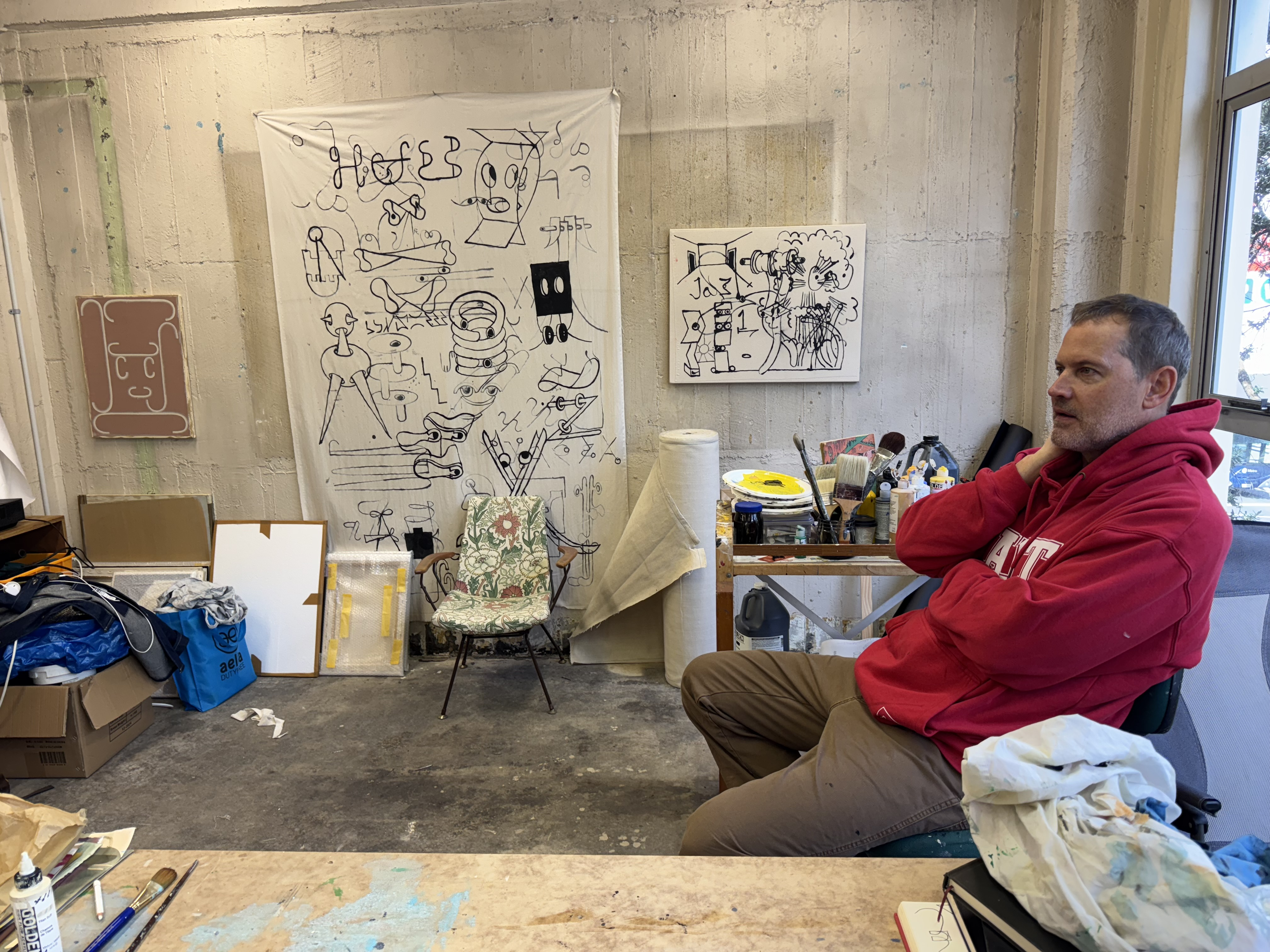
- Julian Hooper in his Auckland studio September 2025
- Born: 1966 (age 59–60); Auckland
- Education: University of Auckland Elam School of Fine Arts, RMIT Melbourne, Australia
- Known for: Examining cultural issues involving the Pacific Islands, New Zealand and Europe
- Website: https://www.julianhooper.com/

Julian Hooper (born 1966) is an Auckland-based artist and educator who has used his mixed family heritage as a way to examine cultural issues involving the Pacific Islands, New Zealand and Europe.

== Early life and education ==
Julian Hooper was born in Auckland to Anthony and Robin Hooper. He has English, Tongan and Hungarian heritage. He spent some of his childhood in Tokelau where his father worked as an anthropologist and his mother as a linguist. Hooper graduated from University of Auckland Elam School of Fine Arts in 1988 and in 1992 he had the opportunity to go to Tahiti for four months to work on an archaeological site that was about to be flooded to create a dam. He learnt a lot as he made a photographic record of the dig and undertook other tasks in a challenging and isolated region. Ten years later he completed a Masters degree from RMIT in Melbourne, Australia.

== Art career ==
Hooper’s first dealer gallery exhibition was in 1989 at the Jeanne D' Estienne Gallery in Vulcan Lane’s Plaza Building: it sold out. The paintings came out of Hooper’s archaeological experiences in Tahiti. New Zealand Herald art critic T. J. McNamara described them as having, ‘considerable charm.’ Hooper continued to show regularly in dealer galleries although in 1996 his career took another turn. He served as a "ghost-artist" for actor Cliff Curtis’s character Daniel Freeman in the TV3 television programme City Life. Hooper noted at the time that the exercise gave him the opportunity to use landscapes as cultural commentary, ‘because land is one of the issues at the heart of cultural identity in New Zealand.’

In 1998 Hooper was awarded the Sarjeant Gallery’s Tylee Cottage Residency in Whanganui. During this residency Hooper researched the life of the Reverend Richard Taylor, a missionary in the nineteenth century. Taylor built close relationships with Māori and was said to have baptised up to two-thirds of the Wanganui district population. He was also a prolific writer and record keeper. Hooper studied Taylor’s journals in preparation for his Residency exhibition May that was held in the Sarjeant Gallery in 1999. Art curator and critic Justin Paton noted that ‘reading and interpreting Reverend Taylor's journals had taught Hooper that private records can seem as strange and hermetic as hieroglyphs on a cave wall when turned out to face the public … a means to put private memories into public space’

Throughout his extensive painting career, Hooper has taken a number of notable changes in style. On leaving art school his early work was focussed on landscape painting. By 1998 art historian Peter Simpson noted a dramatic shift in Hooper’s approach, ‘This daring strategy makes for paintings of austere beauty, elegant simplicity, and challenging significance. Hooper's competent post-impressionist palette has given way to something much more stripped back and contemporary...’ Following the Tylee Cottage Residency, Hooper moved to New York City in 2000 to take up a six-month residency at the International Studio and Curatorial Program. He stayed in New York for three years before returning to New Zealand in 2003.

In 2006 Hooper had his second public art museum exhibition, this time at the Dunedin Public Art Gallery. Taking the collection of historical portraits at Toitū Otago Settlers Museum as his subject, he created an exhibition of 22 works he titled The Future’s Counsel. It brought together visual references from Pacific history with connections to his own Tongan and Hungarian forebears. His work developing these themes was included in exhibitions focused on the Pacific Islands and their cultures (see exhibition list for catalogue links). In an interview in Tautai with Curator of Pacific Cultures at Te Papa Tongarewa Nina Tonga, Hooper described the overarching inspiration of his work as, ‘Old Europe transformed through the experience of the Pacific. Arrivals and departures, ancestors and cultural icons, miscegenation, mythical homelands, Auckland, new beginnings.’ In 2010, in the major exhibition Unnerved: The New Zealand Project shown at the Queensland Art Gallery, 38 works from his Liliu series were included. As art writer Robert Leonard pointed out Hooper’s work prioritising issues around Pacific culture fitted into an exhibition focussed on New Zealand art perfectly and his inclusions of the Hungarian Vlad the Impaler only adding to the dark theme expressed by the exhibitions title. Hooper’s works in the exhibition were purchased by the Gallery in 2008. Hooper’s association with Tonga was further highlighted when in 2014 he was selected for the exhibition Tonga ‘I Onopooni at Pātaka in Porirua that featured artists with Tongan heritage along with New Zealand experience. A number of the artists like Sopolemalama Filipe Tohi, Kulimoe‘anga Stone Maka and Dagmar Dyck reached for traditional Tongan forms while others, like Hooper, applied a more contemporary approach in their work. The exhibition was promoted as, ‘a celebration of contemporary artists of Tongan heritage on the New Zealand visual arts scene.’ Hooper’s work continues to shift in style and focus as can be seen from a 2024 exhibition at City Gallery Wellington, The Letter. He first started to develop work around the formation of alphabets in 2018 and has said of the works, ‘I’m much more interested when the form [of the alphabet] challenges the letters. When it seems wrong, when it makes us look at the letter anew.’

== Selected exhibitions ==
Hooper has been represented by the Gregory Flint Gallery, the Janne Land Gallery and since 2006 by Ivan Anthony in Auckland and in Sydney by Gallery 9 from 2008 to 2025.

1995 Visa Gold Awards. (toured)

1999 May, (solo) Te Whare o Rehua Sarjeant Gallery, Wanganui, New Zealand

2006 Just Painting (group)Auckland Art Gallery Toi o Tāmaki.

2007 Liliu (solo) Gus Fisher Gallery, Auckland

2007 Turbulence (group) Third Auckland Triennial Auckland Art Gallery Toi o Tāmaki.

2008 Julian Hooper: The Future’s Counsel (solo) Dunedin Public Art Gallery.

2010 Liquid Dreams (group) Dowse Art Museum.

2010 Apart, We are Together: Adelaide International 2010 (group) Flinders University Museum of Art and City Gallery.

2011 Unnerved: The New Zealand Project (group) Queensland Art Gallery (toured).

2014 Tonga ‘I Onopooni (group) Pātaka, Porirua (toured).

2015 GOMA10, (group) Queensland, a survey of the gallery’s first decade in 2016.

2016 Necessary Distraction: A Painting Show Auckland Art Gallery Toi o Tāmaki.

2022 Julian Hooper Empties (solo) Reading Room, Sydney Australia.

2022 Walls to Live Beside; Rooms to Own (group) Chartwell Collection, Auckland Art Gallery Toi o Tāmaki .

2024 Julian Hooper The Letter (solo) City Gallery, Wellington.

== Awards ==
1998 Visa Gold Art Awards, Merit Award

1988 Creative New Zealand, assistance toward Sarjeant Gallery project (production of new work, exhibition 1999, publication)

1989 Sarjeant Gallery Tylee Cottage Artist in Residence, April - September

1989 Creative New Zealand, Emerging Artists Grant

== Collections ==
Museum of New Zealand Te Papa Tongarewa,

Auckland Art Gallery Toi o Tāmaki

Queensland Art Gallery

Te Whare o Rehua Sarjeant Gallery, Whanganui

Chartwell Collection, Auckland
