= Leland Miyano =

American sculptor

Leland Miyano is an artist, landscape designer and author born and raised in Hawaiʻi. He received his Fine Arts degree from the University of Hawaiʻi at Mānoa.

His books include A Pocket Guide to Hawaiʻi's Flowers (Mutual, 1997), Hawaiʻi's Beautiful Trees, (Mutual, 1997) and with Douglas Peebles, Hawaii: A Floral Paradise (Mutual 1995).

In the field of landscape design, Miyano designed his own 1-acre (4,000 m^{2}) Kahalu’u garden, featured in Martha Stewart Living, and some of the gardens at The Contemporary Museum, Honolulu. He was a protégé of internationally known Brazilian landscape designer Roberto Burle Marx.

Miyano's work explores man's relationship to nature. Renowned artist Isamu Noguchi encouraged his stone sculpture work and led him from ceramics to the use of volcanic basalt from the local area. His series of large basalt sculptures grace the entrance of the Judiciary Building at Kapolei.

Miyano received the 2008 Catharine E. B. Cox Award for Excellence in the Visual Arts from the Honolulu Museum of Art, resulting in his one-person exhibition, Historia: Naturalia et Artificialia. His work reflects cycles of regeneration in nature and environmental issues.

In 2019, the Honolulu Biennial Foundation named Miyano the first recipient of its Golden Hibiscus Award, a $10,000 unrestricted cash prize given to an artist or collective participating in the biennial. Miyano was selected by a jury composed of Fumio Nanjo, the director of the Mori Art Museum in Tokyo; Christine Y. Kim, associate curator of contemporary art at the Los Angeles County Museum of Art; Konrad Ng, executive director of Shangri La Museum of Islamic Art, Culture & Design in Honolulu; and Isabella Ellaheh “Bella” Hughes, an independent curator and critic. Miyano received the award for his commissioned piece, Huaka’i / A Wake, (2019), which takes the form of a double-hull canoe constructed with invasive plants found in Hawaii and other materials.

The poet W.S. Merwin wrote of him, "Those of us who know him have been aware for years that Leland is a true original, a living treasure among us, and it is fortunate for all of us that his sculpture, with its representations of the irreplaceable life of these islands, is receiving some of the attention and honor it deserves."
