= Hellboy Junior =

- Trade Paperback Cover

Publication information
- Publisher: Dark Horse Comics
- Format: One-shot; Mini-series
- Genre: Horror
- Publication date: October, 1997; October–November, 1999
- No. of issues: 1; 2
- Main character(s): Hellboy

Creative team
- Created by: Mike Mignola
- Written by: Bill Wray; Mike Mignola
- Artist(s): Bill Wray; Stephen DeStefano; Hilary Barta; Dave Cooper; Kevin Nowlan
- Letterer(s): John Costanza
- Colorist(s): Bill Wray; Dave Stewart; Dan Jackson
- Editor(s): Scott Allie

Collected editions
- Hellboy Junior: ISBN 978-1-56971-862-9

Hellboy Junior is a one-shot and two-issue comic book mini-series published by American company Dark Horse Comics. Written and drawn by Bill Wray, Mike Mignola and others, it features a younger version of the fictional character Hellboy.

== Publication history ==
=== Comics ===
==== Halloween Special ====
Hellboy Junior Halloween Special (October 15, 1997) featured a wrap-around cover by Bill Wray.

Mignola won the 1998 "Best Writer/Artist: Drama" Eisner Award in part for his work on this one-shot.

Title	Creators
Maggots, Maggots, Everywhere	Story & Art: Bill Wray
A hell ridden Hellboy Jr. becomes bored of his all maggot diet and is encouraged by Adolf Hitler to go to the surface to hunt.
Wheezy The Sick Little Witch	Story: Bill Wray; Art: Stephan DeStefano
After a sick Wheezy Witch spread her plague germs to all her forest friends she turns to Jasper the friendly ghost for a cure.
The Ginger-Beef Boy	Story: Bill Wray; Art: Hilary Barta
A barren Chinese couple name Jackie and Bruce Lee fashion a child from beef who comes alive and runs away from home.
The Creation of Hellboy Jr.	Story & Art: Bill Wray & Mike Mignola
Bill and Mike battle it out dressed as their book creations in this behind the scenes look at the creative process.
Somnambo The Sleeping Giant	Story & Art: Bill Wray
Eric the Unclean advises the people of Poobie Caca how to wake the sleeping guardian to protect them from rampaging trolls.
Hellboy Jr. Pinup	Art: Kevin Nowlan
Full page pinup.
The Devil Don’t Smoke	Story & Art: Mike Mignola & Bill Wray
Hellboy Jr. ascend to the mortal world to further his studies with an examination of man in this story based on German folklore.

==== Issue 1 ====
Hellboy Junior issue 1 (October 20, 1999) with a wrap-around cover Bill Wray.

Title	Creators
Magical Mushroom Trip	Story: Bill Wray; Art: Dave Cooper
Hellboy Jr. trades Idi Amin’s gold teeth a grow your own mushrooms kit that sends him on a psychedelic trip through hell with a beetle called Brad.
The Wolvertons	Story: Bill Wray; Art: Pat McEown
Alaskan lumberjack Sven Wolverton and Harriet his crash-landed alien wife watch over the twisted love lives of their deformed half-breed children Brad and Tiffany.
Hellboy Jr. Pinup	Art: Glenn Barr
Full page pinup.
Huge Retarded Duck Pinup	Art: Stephan DeStefano
Full page pinup.
Squid of Man	Story: Bill Wray; Art: Mike Mignola
Rogue ichthyologist Pr. Plankton Tidepool attempts to outwit Death when he breathes life into his creations squidman and lobster lady.

==== Issue 2 ====
Hellboy Junior issue 2 (November 17, 1999) with cover by Hilary Barta.

Title	Creators
The House of Candy Pain	Story: Bill Wray; Art: Hilary Barta
Hellboy Jr. travel to the Forbidden Forest of Festible Dwellings with his demonic pal Donnie where he falls under a witch's spell.
Sparky Bear	Story & Art: Bill Wray
Fire prevention mascot Sparky goes rogue after his marriage to a humane female breaks down and he loses his job.
Huge Retarded Duck	Story: Bill Wray; Art: Stephan DeStefano
When Huge Retarded Duck runs away from home after a family argument he has a series of encounters that mean the tables are turned when he finally returns.
Hellboy Jr. Gets a Car	Story & Art: Mike Mignola
When Hellboy Jr. test drives Duke Barbator's new car for Gorgalac he finds himself getting into some serious trouble that could spell the end.

=== Collected editions ===
Hellboy Junior trade paperback (January 21, 2004) collects all the material from Hellboy Junior Halloween Special, Hellboy Junior #1 and Hellboy Junior #2 plus original material.

- Hellboy Jr. vs Hitler
