= William Wray (artist) =

American cartoonist (born 1956)

Bill Wray
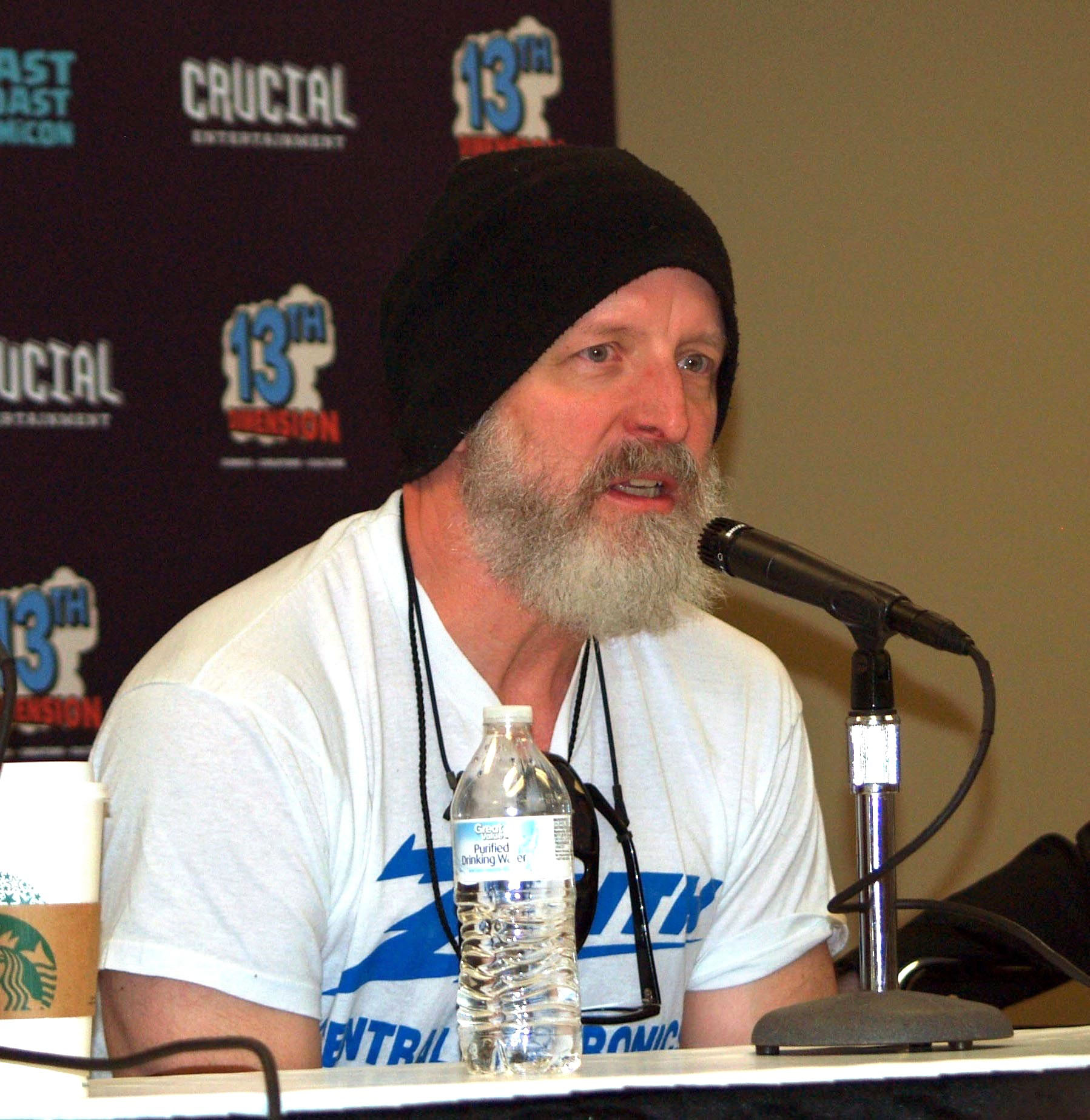
- Wray speaking on a Ren & Stimpy panel in April 2016
- Born: William York Wray; March 24, 1956 (age 70) Fort Meade, Maryland, U.S.
- Areas: Animator; cartoonist; landscape painter
- Notable works: The Ren & Stimpy Show; Urban Landscape series

William York Wray (born March 24, 1956), known professionally in animation as Bill Wray, is an American cartoonist, animator and landscape painter. He is best known for his contributions to Mad and The Ren & Stimpy Show, as well as his current focus on regional landscape painting.

With urban landscapes, cartoon elements, and superheroes as frequent subjects, Wray is noted for a tightly cropped and abstract painting style. The Huffington Post said he "has a brisk, bold style that gives his city scenes a jolt of painterly drama." Southwest Art Magazine called him "a chronicler of the fading urban remains of a bygone era."

== Early life ==
Wray was the son of a lieutenant colonel in Army intelligence, and his family moved frequently, living in Germany, Vietnam and Hong Kong. He often read comic books and watched animated cartoons. In 2009, he said, "I was always drawing because I was lonely."

When he was 10, his family settled in Costa Mesa, California. After high school, he attended Orange Coast College, but dropped out to animate professionally during the day and study art privately weekends and nights with a retired Disney animator. He subsequently animated for Disney, Hanna-Barbera and Filmation. While studying at Sheridan College, he met John Kricfalusi some time before 1981, becoming friends with him and worked with him and fellow dropouts Lynne Naylor and Jim Gomez on miscellaneous projects, producing a bumper for Channel Zero as well as Kricfalusi's first directorial role in a rejected pilot named Ted Bakes One.

== Career ==
In 1985, Wray moved to New York City after leaving the animation industry, doing comic-book work for Marvel and DC Comics while studying at New York's Art Students League. A phone call from John Kricfalusi recruiting him to Spümcø brought him back West in 1991 to work on Nickelodeon's The Ren & Stimpy Show. For the company, he worked on the first two seasons of the series as a background painter until Kricfalusi was fired from the series, where he migrated with future showrunner Bob Camp and other alumni to Games Animation due to his deteriorating relationship with Kricfalusi. He worked as a director at the studio, with his improvement in background painting and emphasis on artistic brilliance often cited as detrimental to his episodes due to his poor writing skills.

After production on Ren & Stimpy wrapped in 1995, Wray had also worked on Samurai Jack, The Mighty B! and other shows. Since 2010, Wray has worked with Rauch Brothers Animation on animated shorts for StoryCorps.

His long-run satirical Monroe series appeared in more than 100 issues of Mad, and he has also co-created Dark Horse Comics Hellboy Junior with Mike Mignola based on the Hellboy character. Wray admires animators such as Bob Clampett, Chuck Jones, Tex Avery and Hanna-Barbera and comic artists like Frank Frazetta, Jack Kirby, Hank Ketcham, Harvey Kurtzman, Erich Sokol and Wally Wood.

Wray now concentrates on landscape oil paintings of landscapes, figures, and urban settings. Wray has said his attitude and approach to his paintings is an attempt to document aspects of urban California that continue to vanish:

The highest compliment I ever received was when a great painter told me my paintings look old. I love the early 20th Century's art and architecture and work hard to invoke comparisons to that period in my work. I love the idea of capturing what's left of a bygone era; recording it before it's gone, replaced by a new strip mall. I've spent my life studying the artists of that era, reaching for a level of skill and feeling that the modern art world has long dismissed as dull-witted craft. I hope my paintings of these old structures has become less an invocation of nostalgia than an important race to record what is fast disappearing. Every time you find an old factory, a rundown dock or an old shack, a developer is sure to be there trying to convince the city it's time to renovate. Good for the economy, they say, but bad for the painter looking for interesting subjects to paint. California's urban pockets of age are disappearing at a record pace, so I have to paint as fast as I can.

Wray's approach to painting was influenced by Frank Brangwyn, Dean Cornwell, Nicolai Fechin, Emile Gruppe, J. C. Leyendecker, Edgar Alwin Payne, Edward Seago, Raimonds Staprans and N. C. Wyeth. He is a member of Laguna Plein Air Painters Association, Oil Painters of America and the California Art Club.

== Awards ==
- 2005: First prize winner in Art Interview - International Online Artist Competition.
- 2005: Second place: 1st Annual 2005 Riverside Plein Air Paint-out
- 2006: Artist Choice Award at the SLO Painting Festival
