= Charles Shipley Cox =

American oceanographer

- Born: September 11, 1922; Maui, Hawaii, U.S.
- Died: November 30, 2015 (aged 93); Del Mar, California, U.S.
- Other names: Chip
- Education: BS in physics from California Institute of Technology in 1944, PhD in oceanography from Scripps Institution of Oceanography in 1954
- Known for: electromagnetic phenomena in the ocean, sea floor pressure measurements
- Spouse: Maryruth Cox
- Awards: National Science Foundation Postdoctoral Fellowship (1957), Fulbright Postdoctoral Grant (1958), two fellowships from the American Geophysical Union (1980, 1982), Maurice Ewing Medal (1992), and the Alexander Agassiz Medal (2001), elected member of the National Academy of Sciences (1996)
- Scientific career
- Fields: Oceanography, geophysics
- Institutions: Scripps Institution of Oceanography, University of California, San Diego
- Academic advisors: Walter Munk

Charles "Chip" Shipley Cox (September 11, 1922 – November 30, 2015) was an oceanographic physicist. He was particularly well known for his work on electromagnetic phenomenon, fine grained pressure and salinity measurements in the ocean depths and surface.

== Early life and education ==
Cox was born to a Quaker family on the Hawaiian island Maui, he was the grandson of Catharine Elizabeth Bean Cox and a relative of Howard Brinton. Cox was raised on the island of Kauai in ʻEleʻele, where his father, Joel Cox, worked as a civil engineer in the McBride sugarcane plantation. He received a bachelor's degree in physics from the California Institute of Technology in 1944, where he learned quantum mechanics from Linus Pauling and worked as a draftsman for William Alfred Fowler at the Kellogg Radiation Lab at Caltech on rocket development for the Navy. Cox started as a graduate student in physics at Caltech, but he became disenchanted by the development and deployment of the atomic bomb and the future of nuclear physics. In 1947 he heard a talk by a researcher from the Scripps Institution of Oceanography, an institution he had previously not known about. Following his love of the ocean he had developed growing up in Hawaii, Cox switched to study at Scripps. He received a PhD in oceanography from the Scripps Institution of Oceanography in 1954, studying under renowned physicist and oceanographer, Walter Munk.

As a graduate student, he purchased a 110 ft Navy reconnaissance vessel, made surplus after World War II, and he worked as a commercial fisherman for albacore, operating this boat designed for a crew of five typically with just a single associate. His graduate adviser, Walter Munk described the experience of going to sea with him thus, "Skipper Cox would signal from the bridge to the engine room, then run down below to get engines going, then run on deck to release the mooring lines, etc. A few hours later, ship cook Cox would dish up a delicious luncheon."

== Career ==
After graduating with his PhD, Cox pursued a brief postdoctoral fellowship in Japan, before returning to Scripps to join the research staff, obtaining a joint position of assistant professor at Scripps, then was promoted to associate professor in 1960 (and received a joint appointment to UCSD which was founded that year), and then full professor in 1966. He retired from actively teaching and advising students in September 1991 and became emeritus, but retained an office at Scripps and continued to do research, including ship based research expeditions to collect data. In his later years he was very interested in the history of science, especially where it interacted with his interests in oceanography. He continued to actively research and write, including a paper on the history of oil being used to calm dangerously breaking waves, published just a few months before his death.

== Research ==
Cox did early work on using light scattering to study properties of the sea surface with Walter Munk. Cox was a pioneer in the development of instrumentation of measure electro-magnetic activity on the seafloor. Developing unique measurement instruments, modeling techniques, and basic theory to both measure and understand the EM properties of the deep oceans. He then did similar work in fine scale measurements of salinity and pressure. Cox developed the differential pressure gauges used for accurately measuring pressure fluctuations on the seafloor, enabling a detailed understanding of seafloor acoustics.
