= Kaili Chun =

Native Hawaiian sculptor and installation artist

- Born: 1962 (age 63–64); Oʻahu, Hawaiʻi, U.S.
- Education: University of Hawai'i at Mānoa
- Awards: Catharine E. B. Cox Award – Honolulu Academy of Arts Individual Artist Award – Hawaiʻi State Foundation on Culture and the Arts Grant – Native Arts and Cultures Foundation
- Website: kailichun.org

Kaili Chun (born 1962) is a Native Hawaiian and American sculptor and installation artist. She also is a lecturer at Kapiʻolani Community College. Her works frequently address Hawaiian culture and history as well as the effects of Westernization. Natural and industrial materials are also common in her artworks.

== Early life and education ==
Chun was born on O'ahu and attended Kamehameha Schools. Her parents are of mixed ancestry and both are part Native Hawaiian. As an undergraduate earning her B.A. in Architecture at Princeton University, Chun studied under ceramic artist Toshiko Takaezu. Chun went on to earn her MFA from the University of Hawaiʻi at Mānoa in 1999. She also apprenticed under Wright Elemakule Bowman Sr., a Native Hawaiian master craftsman and canoe builder from 1996–2003.

== Career ==
Chun was the first Native Hawaiian recipient of the Catharine E. B. Cox Award from the Honolulu Academy of Arts. She has also received the Individual Artist Award from the Hawaii State Foundation on Culture and the Arts and a Native Arts and Cultures Foundation grant. Chun is one of the first Native Hawaiian artists to exhibit in the Venice Biennale in 2015.

Among the locations that have displayed Chun's work are the Museum of Arts and Design, the Venice Biennale, the Biennial of Hawaii Artists at the Contemporary Museum in Honolulu, the Honolulu Academy of Arts, and the Wing Luke Museum.
