= Nina Tonga =

New Zealand Tongan museum curator

Nina Tonga (born 1983) is an Art Historian and Curator of Contemporary Art. She specialises in contemporary Pacific art and visual culture, with a particular focus on gender, representation, and the connections and intercultural relationships between Pacific Island nations and diaspora communities within a local and global context.

== Biography ==
Tonga was born and grew up in Auckland, New Zealand. Her heritage is from the villages of Vaini and Kolofo’ou in Tonga.

Tonga has worked at the University of Auckland in several roles including at the equity office, teaching in the Art History Department and as a Professional Teaching Fellow. She has taught at their Centre of Pacific Studies where she coordinated undergraduate courses in Pacific art, music and dance. Tonga has held the following roles at the National Museum of New Zealand Te Papa Tongarewa (Te Papa), the Curator Contemporary Art (2019-2023), the inaugural Curator Contemporary Pacific Art (2017–2019) and Curator Pacific Cultures (2014–2017). Tonga is the first Pasifika person to hold the Curator of Contemporary Art role at Te Papa.

Part of what drives me as a curator and art historian is the need to write ourselves into the art history of Aotearoa. We haven't always been seen or recognised outside of our own communities. (Nina Tonga)

In 2014 Tonga curated an exhibition of work by thirteen Tongan New Zealand artists called Tonga 'i Onopooni Tonga Contemporary at Pataka Art + Museum in Porirua, Wellington. This was the first exhibition to focus exclusively on the work of artists of Tongan heritage living in New Zealand. Artists included Dagmar Dyck, Sopolemalama Filipe Tohi, Glen Wolfgramm, Julian Hooper, Kulimoe‘anga Stone Maka, ‘Ilo Me‘a Fo‘ou (a Wellington-based women's barkcloth-making collective with 18 members), Ahota‘e‘iloa Toetu‘u, John Vea, Lucy Aukafolau, Emily Mafile‘o, Vea Mafile‘o, Ane Tonga and Terje Koloamatangi Klavenes.

Tonga is a guest writer for The Spinoff, a New Zealand news site. In 2022, Tonga completed her degree at the University of Auckland where her research focuses on 'the ways that Internet platforms have shaped and influenced contemporary art practices'.

In 2023 Tonga was part of the programme at the Auckland Writers Festival.

== Curated exhibitions ==
- Home AKL (2012) – Auckland Art Gallery Toi o Tāmaki (Curated by Ron Brownson. Tonga appeared as Associate Curator along with other Associate Curators Kolokesa Māhina-Tuai, and Ema Tavola)
- Tonga i Onopooni (2014) – Pataka Art + Museum
- Tīvaevae: Out of the Glory Box (2015) – Museum of New Zealand Te Papa Tongarewa
- Pacific Sisters: Fashion Activists (2018–2019) – Museum of New Zealand Te Papa Tongarewa
- To Make Wrong/ Right/ Now (2019) – Honolulu Biennial

== Books ==
- Robin White: Something is Happening Here (2022), co-editor
- Māori Moving Image, ISBN 978-1-877375-73-6, Christchurch Art Gallery Te Puna o Waiwhetū with authors Maree Mills, Melanie Oliver, Bridget Reweti, Ariana Tikao, Nina Tonga, Matariki Williams

== Awards ==
- 2023 Ockhams New Zealand Book Awards shortlist – Robin White: Something is Happening Here (2022), co-editor
