= Sanit Khewhok =

American painter

Sanit Khewhok (Thai: สนิท คิ้วฮก;born 1944) is a painter, sculptor, curator, and conservator.

== Early life and education ==
He was born in Trang, Thailand, in 1944, and, in 1969, graduated from Silpakorn University in Bangkok with a diploma in fine art. He then studied at the Academy of Fine Arts in Rome, where he earned a master's degree in mural painting and Conservation-restoration in 1975.

== Career ==
Edouard Manet by Khewhok

Khewhok was the curator of modern art at the National Gallery of Thailand in Bangkok from 1985 to 1986. In 1985, he spent 100 days in a Thai monastery, and was ordained as a Buddhist monk. After moving to Hawai'i in 1986, he worked at The Contemporary Museum, Honolulu (now the Honolulu Museum of Art Spalding House) as chief conservator and collections manager from 1988 to 2008.

He has had solo exhibitions at both The Contemporary Museum, Honolulu in 1989 and the Honolulu Museum of Art in 2010. In 2010, he became the eleventh recipient of the Catharine E. B. Cox Award for Excellence in the Visual Arts.

Khewhok is best known for his miniature portraits, some painted on pills and wooden ice cream spoons. His Edouard Manet from 1999 is a subtractive drawing in graphite on a used envelope. One of the three stamps is also drawn in graphite. He has exhibited miniature sculptures, including mixed media life-sized sculptures of insects. The Hawaii State Art Museum and the Honolulu Museum of Art are among the public collections holding works by Khewhok.
