= Ferne Jacobs =

American fiber artist

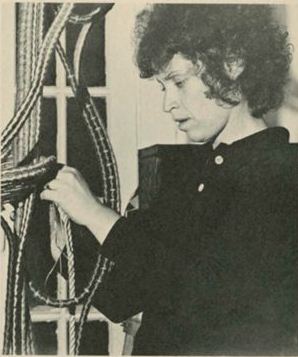
- Ferne Jacobs in 1972
- Born: 1942 (age 83–84); Chicago, Illinois
- Education: Art Center College of Design, Pratt Institute, San Diego State University, Claremont Graduate University
- Known for: Fiber arts

'Snow Circles', coiled and twined waxed linen thread by Ferne Jacobs, 1999, Smithsonian American Art Museum

Ferne Jacobs, who is also known as Ferne K. Jacobs and Ferne Kent Jacobs is an American fiber artist and basket maker.

== Life ==
She was born in Chicago, Illinois in 1942 to Jewish parents who emigrated from Eastern Europe. Her family moved to Los Angeles when Ferne was young. She took art and craft classes at the Art Center College of Design (Pasadena, California, 1960-1963), the Pratt Institute (New York City, 1964-1965), San Diego State University (San Diego, California, 1965), California State University, Long Beach (Long Beach, California, 1966-1967), Haystack Mountain School of Crafts (Deer Isle, Maine, 1967-1971). She earned an MFA from Claremont Graduate University (Claremont, California) in 1976. She credits Dominic di Mare, Lenore Tawney and Arline M. Fisch as her inspirations. Jacobs lives in Los Angeles, California.

Jacobs is best known for her contemporary baskets that combine contemporary colors and non-traditional forms with ancient basket weaving techniques of knotting and twisting. The Honolulu Museum of Art Spalding House (formerly The Contemporary Museum, Honolulu), the Mint Museum of Art (Charlotte, North Carolina) and the Smithsonian American Art Museum are among the public collections holding works by Ferne Jacobs.
