= Chenta Laury =

Visual Artist

Chenta Laury is a visual artist and educator based on Maui, Hawai'i.

== Early life and education ==
Laury is originally from Oahu. She received an undergraduate degree in studio art and art history from Oberlin College, a Masters from Harvard University, and a Certificate in Applied Arts from the Fiber Crafts Studio in Chestnut Ridge, New York.

== Career ==
She has exhibited in shows throughout the country, including a large-scale installation at the Honolulu Biennial, in a group show entitled “Paper is People: Decolonizing Global Paper Cultures” at the Minnesota Center for Book Arts, and a 2023 solo show entitled "Adaptive Frameworks" at the Maui Arts and Cultural Center's Schaefer International Gallery. Her work is held in numerous public and private collections, including the Four Seasons Hotels & Resorts and the Hawaii State Art Museum, and has been awarded prizes from numerous art institutions, including the Hawai'i Craftsmen's Statewide Exhibition.

Prior to moving home to Hawai'i in 2009, she worked at the Guggenheim Museum, and as head of education at the Noguchi Museum in New York City.
