= Abigail Romanchak =

Hawaiian printmaker

- Occupation: Printmaker

Abigail Romanchak is a Maui-based Native Hawaiian printmaker, whose work is collected internationally. Romanchak earned a bachelor's and master's of fine arts in printmaking from University of Hawaii at Manoa. She has held teaching positions at The Contemporary Museum, the Honolulu Museum of Art and Punahou School on Oahu, as well as at Maui Arts & Cultural Center and Hui No’eau Visual Arts Center on Maui. Romanchak's work has been exhibited in the National Gallery of Australia, the University of New South Wales, the State Foundation on Culture and the Arts Hawaii, the White House, the Smithsonian Institution, the National Museum of Australia, Hawaii State Art Museum, and the Nature Conservancy of Hawaii.

== Honors and awards ==
- Romanchak was one of 12 Native Hawaiian artists featured in a $35 million renovation of the Waikiki Beachcomber resort
- 2012 she was recognized as a rising artist in Honolulu Magazine
- Romanchak's work has been recognized multiple times by the Hawaii State Foundation on Culture and the Arts
- 2001 Most Outstanding Printmaker, University of Hawaii Manoa, HI
- 2002 John Young Award for the Arts, Honolulu, HI
- 2003 Kamehameha Schools Scholarships for the Arts, Honolulu, HI
- 2010 Ellen Choy Craig Award, Biennial IX, the Contemporary Museum, HI
- 2011, 2009, 2006 State Foundation on Culture & the Arts, Recognition Award, HI
- 2015 Native Hawaiian Artist Fellowship
