= Ken Little =

American sculptor

Fury, found leather on wood sculpture by Ken Little, 1983, Honolulu Museum of Art

Ken Dawson Little is a modernist San Antonio-based sculptor who was born in Canyon, Texas in 1947. After graduating from Texas Tech University in 1970 with a BFA in painting, he received an MFA from the University of Utah in 1972. There, his interest in painting waned in favor of ceramics. In 1988, he settled in San Antonio, Texas, and his interests shifted to bronze animal masks. Little later shifted to steel sculpture, animal forms constructed from discarded shoes and human forms decoupaged with American paper money. Fury, in the collection of the Honolulu Museum of Art is an example of this stage in the artist's work. He has been a professor of art at the University of Texas at San Antonio since 1988.

Since 1993, he has maintained a studio in a warehouse building that he owns in downtown San Antonio, Texas. He is an advocate for contemporary art in south Texas, renting studio space to 8 other artists. From 1994 to 1999, he directed Rose Amarillo, a 1,500-square-foot (140 m^{2}) alternative exhibition space showing the work of local and national artists.

The Blanton Museum of Art (Austin, Texas), the Crocker Art Museum (Sacramento, California), the Hawaii State Art Museum (Honolulu), the Honolulu Museum of Art, the John Michael Kohler Arts Center (Sheboygan, Wisconsin), the McNay Art Museum (San Antonio, Texas), the Missoula Art Museum (Missoula, Montana), the Museum of Arts and Design (New York), the Richard Nelson Gallery (University of California, Davis), the San Antonio Museum of Art, the Roswell Museum and Art Center (Roswell, New Mexico), the Utah Museum of Fine Arts (Salt Lake City), and the Yellowstone Art Museum (Billings, Montana) are among the public collections holding works by Ken Little.
