= Mamiko (given name) =

- Gender: Female

Origin
- Origin: Japanese
- Meaning: Different meanings depending on the kanji used

Mamiko (written: 麻美子, 眞美子, 真美子, 真宮子 or 麻巳子) is a feminine Japanese given name. Notable people with the name include:

- Mamiko Asō (麻生 真宫子; born 1964), Japanese singer and actress
- Mamiko Higa (比嘉 真美子; born 1993), Japanese professional golfer
- Mamiko Ikeda (池田 眞美子), Japanese screenwriter
- Mamiko Matsumoto (松本 真未子; born 1997), Japanese professional footballer
- Mamiko Noto (能登 麻美子; born 1980), Japanese voice actress
- Mamiko Oshima-Berger (born 1989), marathon runner from the Northern Mariana Islands
- Mamiko Takai (高井 麻巳子; born 1966), Japanese and singer
- Mamiko Tanaka (田中 真美子; born 1996), Japanese basketball player
- Mamiko Toyoda (豊田 まみ子; born 1992), Japanese para-badminton player

== Fictional characters ==
- Mamiko Kuri (涅 見子), a character in the manga series Shadow Star
