= Art Interview – International Online Artist Competition =

The Art Interview - International Online Artists' Competition is a quarterly international art award.

Since its inception in 2004, the award has been given to many emerging artists who have become known to the general public for the first time. It has also been awarded to artists who are considered to be more established, such as Bill Wray, Marcus Antonius Jansen, and Erika Blumenfeld, whose works can be found in museums and other collections. The prize winners receive long-term publication of their winning artwork with the sponsoring online magazine (art-interview.com). The first-place winner of the award receives a published interview in Art Interview Online Magazine alongside the interviews of well-established artists such as: El Anatsui, Artists Anonymous, Jim Avignon, David Černý, Richard Estes, Janet Fish, Eric Fischl, Alex Katz, Oleg Kulik, Jesus Moroles, Sylvia Sleigh, Richard Stipl and Kehinde Wiley.
