= Florence Jaukae Kamel =

Papua New Guinea artist and designer

- Known for: Bilum art
- Movement: Contemporary art

Florence Jaukae Kamel is a Papua New Guinea artist and designer, particularly known for her work in the traditional medium of bilum, plant fibres woven into yarn, and then looped or crocheted to make bags or dresses and other garments. Kamel is known locally as the "Bilum Meri". Kamel is also "an outspoken advocate for women's rights".

== Early life ==
Kamel was taught how to make bilum by her grandmother.

== Career ==
Kamel was elected to be a local government councillor in 2002. Kamel is one of the founders of Jaukae Bilum Products. She is the managing director of the Goroka Bilum Weavers Cooperative.

In 2011, Kamel's bilum work was "recognised as an important statement of gender empowerment" by the Australian Museum, who acquired examples of it for their Pacific Collections. Her work has also appeared in the Queensland Gallery of Modern Art exhibition Threads Contemporary Textiles and the Social Fabric.

In 2016, Kamel exhibited her work in New York and London as both art and fashion in runway shows, with the support of Women Empowerment, a United Nations program which helped her and women from six countries with a two-week workshop before the New York and London events. Kamel said, "After the training, the organisers of the event asked me if I could sew two bilum dresses in five weeks for the runway show and I did it right away using vines from Okapa (Eastern Highlands) and fibre from Kavieng (New Ireland)."

== Personal life ==
Kamel lives in Eastern Highlands Province, and has five children.
