= Michael Tom =

American sculptor

Man: b. 1910-d. 1969/Woman: b. 1914-d. 1974 by Michael Tom, copper, 1989, Hawaii State Art Museum

Michael Tom (1946–1999) was an American sculptor.

== Early life ==
Tom was born and raised in Honolulu, Hawaii. Tom was adopted and named as Michael Goon Bing Tom. Tom's sister is Crystella.

== Education ==
In 1971, Tom received a Bachelor of Fine Arts degree in painting and metalsmithing from Sonoma State University in Rohnert Park, California, and pursued graduate studies at San Diego State University.

== Career ==
Tom started his career as a teacher for students with special needs.

Tom started his artistic career as a painter, but was then drawn to making art jewelry. Art jewelry led to metalsmithing, which in turn led to metal and mixed media sculpture.

In 1992, Tom was the recipient of the second Catharine E. B. Cox Award for Excellence in the Visual Arts and has a solo exhibition at the Honolulu Academy of Arts Tom is best known for his small sculptures of hammered copper. Death is a pervasive theme in his work (Clark, 1996).

Some of his sculptures are anthropomorphic, referencing birth, war, and death. Man: b. 1910-d. 1969/Woman: b. 1914-d. 1974, in the collection of the Hawaii State Art Museum, demonstrates the artist's anthropomorphic work. The East-West Center, the Hawaii State Art Museum, and the Honolulu Museum of Art and they are among the public collections holding sculptures by Michael Tom.

== Personal life ==
Tom's second wife was Pamela Simon. On April 12, 1999, Tom died of liver cancer in Honolulu, Hawaii. He was 52 years old.

== Additional sources ==
- Clarke, Joan and Diane Dods, Artists/Hawaii, Honolulu, University of Hawaii Press, 1996, 110-115.
- Contemporary Museum, Honolulu, The Contemporary Museum Biennial of Hawaii Artists IV, Contemporary Museum, Honolulu, 1999, pp. 19–21.
- East-West Center, East-West Treasures, Selected Works from the Permanent Collection, East-West Center, Honolulu, 2010, p. 8.
- Hartwell, Patricia L. (editor), Retrospective 1967-1987, Hawaii State Foundation on Culture and the Arts, Honolulu, Hawaii, 1987, p. 110
- Yoshihara, Lisa A., Collective Visions, 1967-1997, An Exhibition Celebrating the 30th Anniversary of the State Foundation on Culture and the Arts, Art in Public Places Program, Presented at the Honolulu Museum of Art, September 3-October 12, 1997, Honolulu, State Foundation on Culture and the Arts, 1997, p. 59.
