= Mami Kataoka =

Japanese art curator and writer

Mami Kataoka (Japanese: 片岡 真実) is a Japanese art curator and writer. She is presently the director of the Mori Art Museum in Tokyo.

== Early life and education ==
Kataoka was born in 1965 in Nagoya. She received a BA from Aichi University of Education in 1988.

== Career ==
=== Tokyo Opera City Art Gallery, 1992–2002 ===
Kataoka was chief curator of the Tokyo Opera City Art Gallery, where she worked from the start of the project to create the gallery, from 1992 until 2002, three years after its opening in 1999. There she curated "Releasing Senses" (inaugural exhibition in 1999), "Tatsuo Miyajima: Mega Death" (2000), "Encounter" (2001), "Rirkrit Tiravanija" (2002) and collaborated on projects including "Territory: Contemporary art from the Netherlands" (2000), "My home is yours, your home is mine" (2001), "JAM: Tokyo-London" (2001), "Under Construction: New Dimensions in Asian Contemporary Art" (2002), among others.

=== Mori Art Museum, 2003–present ===
Between 2003 and 2019, Kataoka was the Chief Curator of the Mori Art Museum, Tokyo, Japan. In 2019 she was appointed director, succeeding Fumio Nanjo. The Mori Art Museum is a contemporary art museum in Roppongi Hills in Tokyo. During her tenure at the Mori Art Museum, Kataoka has curated a number of exhibitions, including: “Ai Weiwei: According to What?” (2009), which is touring in the United States from 2012 onwards, and “Lee Bul: From Me, Belongs to You Only” (2012), the first large-scale solo exhibition of Asia's leading female artist. In addition to overseeing the activities of the curatorial department at the Mori, she has curated diverse exhibitions such as "Roppongi Crossing: New Visions in Contemporary Japanese Art 2004", which provided an overview of the recent art scene in Japan; "Ozawa Tsuyoshi: Answer with Yes and No!" (2004), which was the first in a series to introduce mid-career Asian artists with solo exhibitions; co-curated "Follow Me!: Chinese Art at the Threshold of the New Millennium" (2005), which showed the museum's strong focus on Asian contemporary art; and "MAM Projects", which sought to encourage young and upcoming artists internationally. She curated the first three MAM Projects: 001: Santiago Cucullu (2004), 002: Jun Nguyen-Hatsushiba (2004) and 003: R.O.R (Revolutions on Request), a group from Finland. She has also worked on "Hiroshi Sugimoto: End of Time" (2005) in collaboration with the Hirshhorn Museum and Sculpture Garden in Washington D.C. and "Tokyo-Berlin / Berlin-Tokyo" (2006) in collaboration with the Neue Nationalgalerie in Berlin.

From 2007-2009, Kataoka joined the curatorial team at the Hayward Gallery, London as the esteemed gallery's first international curator. Here she curated “Laughing in a Foreign Language” (2008) an exhibition exploring a role of humour in diverse cultures.

Kataoka is a key figure in documenting and analyzing trends within contemporary Japanese art since 2000, considering relevant social historical and generational themes evident in contemporary Japanese art. She most recently guest curated “Phantoms of Asia: Contemporary Awakens the Past” (2012) at the Asian Art Museum of San Francisco.

Kataoka was a Co-Artistic Director of ROUNDTABLE: The 9th Gwangju Biennale (Korea, 2012). Recognizing the temporary and circulatory nature of biennales, which by definition reflect shifting curatorial themes and structures in rotation, Kataoka's work as part of the ROUNDTABLE curatorial team confronted the diverse inter-connectivities of different contexts within which we can find our own temporal positioning.

== Other activities ==
In 2019, Kataoka was a member of the juries that selected Apichatpong Weerasethakul as recipient of the Artes Mundi prize and Lawrence Abu Hamdan for the Edvard Munch Art Award. In 2024, she was part of the selection committee that chose Naomi Beckwith as the artistic director of Documenta Sixteen. In 2026, she was a member of the five-person jury that selected [[[Trevor Paglen]] for that year's LG Guggenheim Award.
