= Deborah Nehmad =

American artist

WASTED (II) by Deborah Nehmad

Detail of WASTED (II) by Deborah Nehmad

Deborah Gottheil Nehmad (born 1952) is an American artist and attorney.

== Life ==
Nehmad was born in Brooklyn.

Deborah Nehmad received a Bachelor of Arts from Smith College in 1974 and a Juris Doctor degree (J.D.) from Georgetown University Law Center in 1982. After graduating, she practiced law and worked in politics (including the Carter White House). In 1984, her legal work brought her to Hawaii. Due to a back injury, she phased out her legal practice and began taking art courses at the Honolulu Academy of Arts and the University of Hawaii at Manoa. She eventually matriculated at the latter, receiving an MFA in printmaking in 1998.

Nehmad produced primarily abstract prints employing various techniques, often including pyrography. Since the mid 2010s, she has been creating works that deal with the issue of gun violence in the United States.

== Collections ==
The Davis Museum and Cultural Center (Wellesley College), the Fine Arts Museums of San Francisco, the Hammer Museum (Los Angeles), the Hawaii State Art Museum, the Honolulu Museum of Art, the Hood Museum of Art (Hanover, New Hampshire), the Museum of Modern Art, New York, the Smith College Museum of Art, and the Yale University Art Gallery are among the public collections holding work by Deborah Nehmad.
