= Honolulu Museum of Art Spalding House =

The Honolulu Museum of Art Spalding House, formerly The Contemporary Museum, Honolulu, was integrated into the Honolulu Museum of Art under this name. It was the only museum in the state of Hawaii devoted exclusively to contemporary art. The Contemporary Museum had two venues: in residential Honolulu at the historic Spalding House, and downtown Honolulu at First Hawaiian Center. All venues continue to be open to the public.

== Collection ==
Artists represented in the permanent collection included Vito Acconci, Josef Albers, Robert Arneson, Jennifer Bartlett, Robert Brady, John Buck, Christopher Bucklow, Deborah Butterfield, Enrique Martinez Celaya, Enrique Chagoya, Dale Chihuly, John Coplans, Joseph Cornell, Gregory Crewdson, Robert Cumming, Stephen De Staebler, Richard DeVore, Jim Dine, Herbert Ferber, Llyn Foulkes, Judy Fox, Sam Francis, David Gilhooly, David Hockney, Diane Itter, Ferne Jacobs, Bill Jacobson, Jasper Johns, Donald Judd, Ron Kent, William Kentridge, Sanit Khewhok, Edward Kienholz and Nancy Reddin Kienholz, Sol LeWitt, Ken Little, Tony Marsh, Junko Mori, Yasumasa Morimura, Robert Motherwell, Vik Muniz, Jay Musler, Ron Nagle, Otto and Gertrud Natzler, Louise Nevelson, Catherine Opie, Dennis Oppenheim, Otto Piene, Kenneth Price, Lucie Rie, Liza Ryan, Alison Saar, Lucas Samaras, Adrian Saxe, James Seawright, Joseph Seigenthaler, Andres Serrano, David Smith, Kiki Smith, Rudolf Staffel, Pat Steir, Frank Stella, Jason Teraoka, Masami Teraoka, Mark Tobey, Richard Tuttle, Peter Voulkos, Kara Walker, Andy Warhol, William Wegman, Tom Wesselmann, Beatrice Wood, Cindy Wright and Daisy Youngblood. With the merger of The Contemporary Museum, Honolulu and the Honolulu Museum of Art, this collection became the property of the Honolulu Museum of Art and is often on view at both Spalding House and at the main museum building on Thomas Square.

== History ==
In addition to preserving art since 1940, the museum maintained the historic Spalding House and gardens. The Spalding House in Makiki Heights was built as a residence in 1925 by Anna Rice Cooke, widow of Charles Montague Cooke. At the same time, the Honolulu Museum of Art was being built on the site of her former home on Beretania Street in Honolulu. The Makiki Heights home was designed by Hart Wood and later enlarged by the firm of Bertram Goodhue and Associates. The Honolulu Academy of Arts acquired the estate as a bequest from Cooke's daughter, Alice Spalding, in 1968 and operated it as an annex for the display of Japanese prints from 1970 to 1978. A private developer in the late 1970s sold it to a subsidiary of The Honolulu Advertiser. In 1986, the Thurston Twigg-Smith family converted it to The Contemporary Museum. Following interior renovation and the construction of the Milton Cades Pavilion, the museum opened to the public in October 1988. In addition to galleries, the museum consisted of a shop, cafe, administrative offices, storage and work areas, and a director residence.

The gardens were originally landscaped between 1928 and 1941 by Reverend K. H. Inagaki, a Christian minister of Japanese ancestry. From 1979 to 1980, the gardens were resuscitated by Honolulu landscape architect James C. Hubbard. During the 1990s, Kahaluʻu-based landscape architect Leland Miyano brought the gardens to their current state. The grounds display sculpture by Satoru Abe, Charles Arnoldi, Deborah Butterfield, Jedd Garet, George Rickey, Toshiko Takaezu, DeWain Valentine and Arnold Zimmerman, and a wall painting by Paul Morrison.

Spalding House is located at 2411 Makiki Heights Drive, Honolulu, Hawaii, and is open to the public. coordinates 21°18′43″N 157°49′58″W.

== Honolulu Museum of Art at First Hawaiian Center ==
A satellite facility of the former Contemporary Museum located in downtown Honolulu in the First Hawaiian Center, the corporate headquarters of First Hawaiian Bank, opened in 1996. The exhibits focus on Hawaiian art and are underwritten by First Hawaiian Bank. The gallery is now curated by the Honolulu Museum of Art staff as the result of the merger of the Honolulu Academy of Arts and the Contemporary Museum of Honolulu.

== Merger with the Honolulu Museum of Art ==
On May 2, 2011, The Contemporary Museum, Honolulu ceased to exist as an independent entity. The galleries and grounds continue to be open to the public with the staff of the former Contemporary Museum joining the staff of the Honolulu Museum of Art. The director of the Contemporary Museum became deputy director of the Honolulu Museum of Art, and the curatorial staff became a new Department of Contemporary Art at the larger museum. The Contemporary Museum's collection of more than 3,000 works of art, endowments, and other assets were transferred to the Honolulu Museum of Art. The transferred artworks now have accession numbers beginning with "TCM". The Makiki Heights building, which has about 5,000 square feet of gallery space, reassumed its former name, "Spalding House".
