= Dorothy Faison =

American painter

Guardian of the Break by Dorothy Faison, 1995, Hawaii State Art Museum

Dorothy A. Faison also Dorothy Ries Faison (born 1955) is an American artist who was born in Schenectady, New York. She lived in Central and South America from age six to age twelve, because her stepfather worked for the United States Agency for International Development. Her family returned to the United States in 1968, and settled in Hawaii. She received a bachelor of fine arts degree from the University of Hawaii at Manoa in 1977 and earned a master of fine arts degree from the Otis Art Institute in 1979. In 1990, Dorothy Faison was the recipient of the first Catharine E. B. Cox Award for Excellence in the Visual Arts and has a solo exhibition at the Honolulu Academy of Arts. As of 2017 she lives and works in Dordogne, France, with her filmmaker husband, Simon Holland.

Most of Faison's art is multimedia. She was greatly influenced by her exposure to the native American cultures of Latin America, especially the Aymara and Quechua, whose rituals combined Christianity, mysticism and magic. Her painting Guardian of the Break, in the Hawaii State Art Museum is an example of the artists use of a varied mix of media to create a complex surface. It was created with oil paint, alkyd, pigments, charcoal, watercolor and dog hair on canvas. This large (60 in × 110.75 in [1,524 mm × 2,813 mm]) painting also demonstrates her use of symbols laden with allusions and personal meanings. The large central object could be either a bathtub or a sarcophagus. The Hawaii State Art Museum and the Honolulu Museum of Art are among the public collections holding work by Dorothy Faison.
