= Catharine E. B. Cox Award for Excellence in the Visual Arts =

Biennial award given to visual artist

- Description: Biennial award honoring Hawaii-based visual artists
- Country: United States
- Presented by: Honolulu Museum of Art (HoMA)

The Catharine E. B. Cox Award for Excellence in the Visual Arts is a biennial award given to a visual artist who is a former or current resident of Hawaii. The recipient may work in any medium, and is honored with a solo exhibition at the Honolulu Museum of Art. The award was established in 1985 by Charles S. Cox of La Jolla, California, Doak C. Cox of Honolulu and Richard H. Cox of Honolulu to honor their grandmother, Catharine Elizabeth Bean Cox.

== Recipients ==
Recipients of the award have been:

- 1990 Dorothy Faison
- 1992 Michael Tom
- 1994 Laura Smith
- 1996 Shigeru Miyamoto
- 1998 Hanae Uechi Mills
- 2000 Renee Iijima
- 2002 Yida Wang
- 2004 Lonny Tomono
- 2006 Ka'ili Chun
- 2008 Leland Miyano
- 2010 Sanit Khewhok
- 2012 John Tanji Koga
- 2015 Maya Lea Portner
- 2017 Charles Cohan

== See also ==
- Catharine Elizabeth Bean Cox
