= Catharine Elizabeth Bean Cox =

American art historian

Catharine Elizabeth Bean Cox (1865–1964) was born in Iowa into a Quaker family on August 11, 1865.

== Biography ==
She received a BA from Bryn Mawr College in 1889. In 1891, she married Isaac Milton Cox. In 1898, she and her family moved to Hawaii, spurred by Isaac's poor health. Cox taught at Punahou School and helped Anna Rice Cooke catalog her art collection, which formed the basis of the Honolulu Museum of Art. She subsequently served as the museum's director from 1927 to 1928. Cox died on December 7, 1964, aged 99.

The Catharine E. B. Cox Award for Excellence in the Visual Arts was established in her honor in 1985 by her grandchildren Charles Shipley Cox of La Jolla, California, Doak C. Cox of Honolulu and Richard H. Cox of Honolulu.
