= Deborah Butterfield =

American sculptor (born 1949)

- Sculpture by Deborah Butterfield, 1986, Honolulu Museum of Art Spalding House
- Born: May 7, 1949 (age 77); San Diego, California, U.S.
- Education: University of California, Davis
- Known for: Sculpture

Deborah Kay Butterfield (born May 7, 1949) is an American sculptor. Along with her artist-husband John Buck, she divides her time between a farm in Bozeman, Montana, and studio space in Hawaii. She is known for her sculptures of horses made from found objects, like metal, and especially pieces of wood.

== Background ==
Born the same day as the 75th running of the Kentucky Derby (May 7, 1949), Butterfield partly credits that birthdate as an inspiration for her subject matter; she has also said that she would have preferred to work in the female form, but that her mentor Manuel Neri dominated that form. Instead, she chose to create metaphorical self-portraits using images of horses. Gradually, the horses themselves became her primary theme. Butterfield earned her bachelor's degree (1972) at the University of California, Davis with Honors and a Master of Fine Arts (1973) at the University of California, Davis, where she met her husband, artist John Buck, whom she married in 1974.

Butterfield taught sculpture at the University of Wisconsin–Madison and at Montana State University – Bozeman from the mid-1970s to the mid-1980s. Since 1986, Butterfield has spent her summers in Montana, and winters in Hawaii.

== Career ==
Riot (1990), steel sculpture by Deborah Butterfield, at the Delaware Art Museum in February 2017

Butterfield's work has been exhibited widely and there is demand among art collectors for her sculptures. Her earliest works from the mid-1970s were made from sticks and natural detritus gathered on her property in Bozeman, Montana. "The materials and images were meant to suggest that the horses were both figures and ground, merging external world with the subject." She began crafting horses out of scrap metal and cast bronze in the early 1980s. She would sculpt a piece using wood and other materials fastened together with wire, then photograph the piece from all angles so as to be able to reassemble the piece in metal.

=== Horses as a metaphor ===
Butterfield has said, "I first used the horse images as a metaphorical substitute for myself – it was a way of doing a self-portrait one step removed from the specificity of Deborah Butterfield." She also said, "These first horses were huge plaster mares whose presence was extremely gentle calm. They were at rest, and in complete opposition to the raging warhorse (stallion) that represents most equine sculpture. The next series of horses was made of mud and sticks and suggested that its forms were left clotted together after the river flooded and subsided. the pieces were dark and almost sinister, reflecting the realization that I was perhaps more like the warhorse than the quiet mares. For me they represented the process of attitudes and feelings taking shape after a flood of experiences. The materials and images were to suggest that the horses were both figure and ground, merging external world with the subject."

As critic Grace Glueck wrote in The New York Times in 2004, "By now Deborah Butterfield's skeletal horses, fashioned of found wood, metal and other detritus, are familiar to almost a generation of gallerygoers. Yet they still have a freshness, which comes from the artist's regard for them as individuals. In fact, training, riding and bonding with horses, as she does at her Montana farm, she thinks of them as personifications of herself ... They seem to express the very spirit of equine existence."

Butterfield has said that her horses are intended to make a feminist statement. "I wanted to do these big, beautiful mares that were as strong and imposing as stallions but capable of creation and nourishing life. It was a very personal feminist statement."

=== Representation and exhibitions ===
Deborah Butterfield is represented by Marlborough Gallery, New York; Anglim Gilbert Gallery, San Francisco; Greg Kucera Gallery, Seattle, Washington; LA Louver, Los Angeles, California; and Zolla/Lieberman Gallery, Chicago, Illinois. The Honolulu Museum of Art, the Rockwell Museum (Corning, N.Y), the Whitney Museum of American Art (New York City), Madison Museum of Contemporary Art (Madison, WI), the Metropolitan Museum of Art (New York City), the Delaware Art Museum, the Boise Art Museum, the Albrecht-Kemper Museum of Art (St. Joseph, Missouri), the Neuberger Museum of Art (Purchase, New York), and the Frederik Meijer Gardens & Sculpture Park (Grand Rapids, MI) are among the public collections holding work by Deborah Butterfield. Also, the Rockford Art Museum, Rockford, Illinois. Butterfield was featured in the 1989 Women's Art show, Women's Work: the Montana Women's Centennial Art Survey Exhibition 1889–1989. In the Pappajohn Sculpture Park at Des Moines, Iowa, Deborah Butterfield has 2 sculptures installed there, which are Juno (1989) and Ancient Forest (2009).

== Materials and construction ==
Initially constructing her sculptures using natural materials such as mud, clay and sticks in the 1970s, Butterfield has since moved to using metal in her work. In 1979, she began using reclaimed materials such as found steel and scrap metal. For the past 20 plus years, Butterfield has been using bronze casts of "stray, downed pieces of wood." Butterfield carefully selects pieces of wood that outline the form and gesture of the horse. The wood pieces are then cast in bronze, burning the wood away.

Referencing her materials, Butterfield has said, "When I walk past my pile of junk, I am inspired by the things I see. It has to do with finding and identifying objects of interest that I can work with. Working with junk is a way of recognizing a quality of line and appropriating it to my sculpture."

== See also ==
- Horses in art
