= John E. Buck =

American sculptor (born 1946)

The Archer, patinated bronze sculpture by John E. Buck, 1991. As of 2019, this sculpture is on display at the Spalding House campus of the Honolulu Museum of Art

Father and Son, color woodblock print on paper by John E. Buck, 1981, Smithsonian American Art Museum

John Buck (born 1946) is an American sculptor and printmaker who was born in Ames, Iowa.

== Background and education ==
He received a Bachelor of Fine Arts degree from Kansas City Art Institute in 1968, and in 1971, he studied at Skowhegan School of Painting and Sculpture in Skowhegan, Maine. In 1972, he received a Master of Fine Arts degree from the University of California, Davis.

== Works ==
Buck is best known for his woodblock prints (such as Father and Son) and bronze sculptures (such as The Archer) that are typically cast from molds taken from wooden maquettes. The DeCordova Museum (Lincoln, Massachusetts), the Fine Arts Museums of San Francisco, the Hawaii State Art Museum, the Honolulu Museum of Art, the Smithsonian American Art Museum (Washington D.C.) and the Yellowstone Art Museum (Montana) are among the public collections holding works by John Buck.

== Personal ==
While studying at Davis, Buck met his wife, artist Deborah Butterfield. They married in 1974. Buck and Butterfield divide their time between a farm in Bozeman, Montana and studios on the island of Hawaii.
