= Ordway Prize =

- Description: Awarded to an artist and a curator/writer for significant impact on contemporary art
- Country: United States
- Presented by: New Museum & Creative Link for the Arts

The Ordway Prize, created in 2005, is awarded every other year to two recipients, one artist and one curator/arts writer who have had significant impact on the field of contemporary art. Since 2008, the prize has been administered by the New Museum in New York in conjunction with Creative Link for the Arts. It carries with it an unrestricted cash award of $100,000. The nominees are between the ages of forty and sixty-five and must have a developed body of work extending over a minimum of fifteen years. The winners are chosen by a jury composed of arts professionals.

About Creative Link

"Creative Link for the Arts is a privately funded nonprofit organization dedicated to facilitating partnership in philanthropy and forging innovative relationships between art institutions, nonprofits, corporations, and philanthropists interested in supporting the arts and creating a cultural legacy."

== History of the Prize ==
2005 Winners

- Doris Salcedo, Artist
- Ralph Rugoff, Curator

2008 Winners

- James Elaine, Curator/Arts Writer
- Cildo Meireles, Artist

2010 Nominees

- Tania Bruguera, Artist
- William Pope.L, Artist
- Artur Żmijewski, Artist
- Sabine Breitwieser, Curator/Arts Writer
- Hou Hanru, Curator/Arts Writer
- Hamza Walker, Curator/Arts Writer

2010 Winners

- Hamza Walker, Curator/Arts Writer
- Artur Zmijewski, Artist
