= Fumio Nanjo =

Japanese curator and art historian

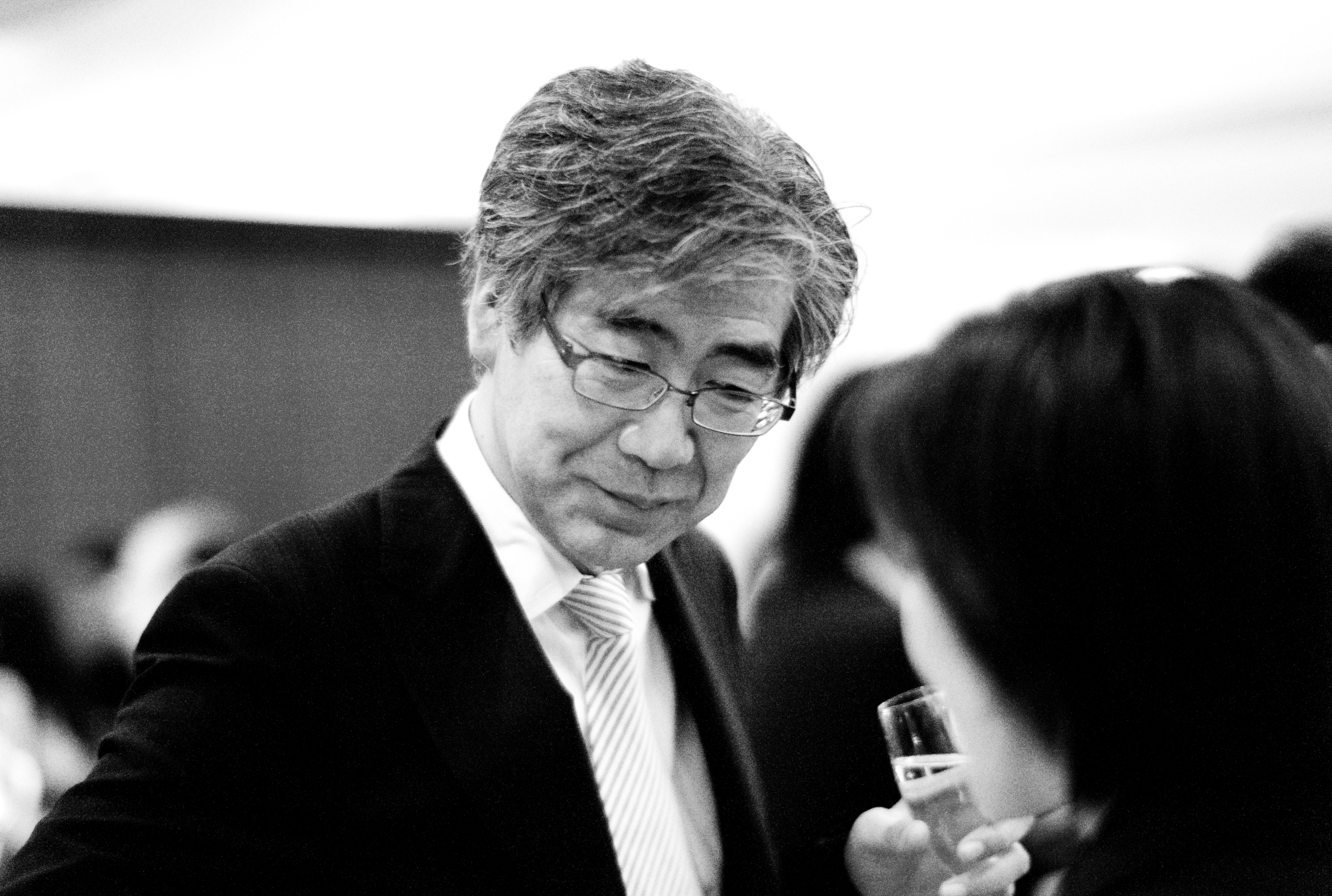
Fumio Nanjo at a party in his honor, November 2007.

Fumio Nanjo (南條 史生, Nanjō Fumio; born 1949 in Tokyo) is a curator and art historian. Between 2006 and 2019 he was the director of the Mori Art Museum in Tokyo. A graduate of Keio University, Nanjo was previously Director of the Institute of Contemporary Arts in Nagoya (1986–1990) and served as commissioner of the Japan Pavilion at the Venice Biennale (1997).

He has curated many art exhibitions and directed many art program, including the Taipei Biennale (1998); the Asia-Pacific Triennial of Contemporary Art (1999); the Yokohama Triennale (2001), the Singapore Biennale (2006, 2008) and the inaugural Honolulu Biennial (2017). In 2018 he curated the exhibition Japan in Architecture: Genealogies of Its Transformations at the Mori Art Museum.

Fumio Nanjo was one of the co-organizers of 1994 exhibition “Open Air ’94 Out of Bounds̶ Contemporary Art in the Seascape” held in Naoshima.

Nanjo also contributed to exhibitions catalogues, art journals and magazines, and is the author of From Art to the City (1997) and Asian Contemporary Art Report: China, India, Middle East and Japan (2010).
