= James Seawright =

American sculptor (1936-2022)

Mirror XV, Mirrors and fiberglass construction by James Seawright, 1987, Honolulu Museum of Art

James Seawright (1936 – February 12, 2022) was an American modernist sculptor.

Seawright was born in Jackson, Mississippi, and grew up in Greenwood, Mississippi. As a boy, he discovered machine tools at a friend’s house, which launched his lifelong love of making objects by hand. Later, when serving in the United States Navy, he pursued every available opportunity to work with new tools and materials, gravitating toward the machine shop on his ship and the hobby shops on the base, where he made furniture.

== Life and career ==
When he moved to New York in 1961, Seawright prowled Canal Street for the electronic parts that proliferated after World War II. Inspired by the Bauhaus movement, which he said, “was doing revolutionary things with light even before the war,” he realized that he could “use modern electronics and controlled technology to apply to sculpture.” Seawright became a pioneer of interactive sculptures, using mirrors and electronic components in his work. Mirror XV, in the collection of the Honolulu Museum of Art, is an example of this phase of his work.

He started teaching at Princeton University in 1969 and served as acting director and then director of the Program in Visual Arts from 1975 to 2001. He is recognized as a pioneer of kinetic, electronic sculpture.

The Butler Institute of American Art (Youngstown, Ohio), the Honolulu Museum of Art, the Museum of Modern Art (New York City), the Nelson-Atkins Museum of Art (Kansas City, Missouri), the Neuberger Museum of Art, (Purchase College, Purchase, New York), the New Jersey State Museum (Trenton, New Jersey), the Rose Art Museum (Brandeis University), the Solomon R. Guggenheim Museum (New York City), the University of Michigan Museum of Art (Ann Arbor, Michigan), the Smithsonian American Art Museum, the Weatherspoon Art Museum, the Hunter Museum, and the Whitney Museum (New York City) are among the public collections holding works by James Seawright.

Seawright died on February 12, 2022.

== Sources ==
- Cynthia: Digital Visions. Computer and Art. New York 1987, p. 135,141ss.
- Douglas: Art and the Future: A History. Prophecy of the Collaboration Between Science, Technology and Art. New York 1973, p. 75s.,153-156.
- Honolulu Museum of Art, Spalding House Self-guided Tour, Sculpture Garden, 2014, p. 7
- New Jersey State Museum, Sculptures by George Rickey and James Seawright, New Jersey State Museum, Trenton, 1970.
- Thomas Dreher: History of Computer Art, chap. II.3.3: Light and Sound Installations of James Seawright and Vladimir Bonacic.
