= Physically integrated dance =

Dance form

The physically integrated dance movement is part of the disability culture movement, which recognizes and celebrates the first-person experience of disability, not as a medical model construct but as a social phenomenon, through artistic, literary, and other creative means.

== History ==
Modern integrated or inclusive dance was first explored during the late 1960s. Dance instructor Hilde Holger taught dance to her son, who had Down syndrome, and went on to stage a performance that included intellectually disabled dancers at Sadler's Wells in 1968. Among Holger's students was Wolfgang Stange, who was inspired to found a company to perform integrated dance works, the Amici Dance Theatre Company. Yvonne Rainer, a prominent post-modern dancer and choreographer, was recovering from a surgery in 1967 when she restaged a version of her famous work Trio A on herself, called it Convalescent Dance and performed it at the Playhouse at Hunter College in New York. In 2010, in her 70s, Rainer restaged the piece again and called it Trio A: Geriatric with Talking to showcase how with her older body "getting up and down off the floor requires a lot more maneuvering than it used to".

Integrated dance gained a higher profile with the mainstream public during the 1980s. In 1986, DV8 Physical Theatre was founded in London, England, and in 1987, the AXIS Dance Company was founded in California. A number of other dance companies around the world now perform with physically or mentally disabled dancers.

Some physically integrated dance companies are founded or led by people who identify as disabled and/or work with disabled choreographers. Many dance works performed by such companies challenge conceptions of dance, stage, and artistry in their work, such as Kim Manri (Taihen), Gerda Koenig (DIN A 13), Petra Kuppers (The Olimpias), Raimund Hoghe, Claire Cunningham, Neil Marcus, Bill Shannon and Marc Brew.

In 2017, Judith Smith was interviewed by Dance Magazine in light of her stepping down as Artistic Director of AXIS Dance Company. In the interview she stated that the biggest challenge to physically integrated dance is the lack of accessibility to dance training for disabled dancers. She said the barrier that has slowed improvement to training access is that dance teachers are not trained in how to teach dance to students with disabilities; some of these teachers, Smith said, are not aware that there is a demand of disabled students who would take their classes if it was offered.

As a new generation entered in the movement in the late 2010s and early 2020s, new perspectives of how to better support, train, and accommodate disabled dancers emerged. Dancer, engineer, and wheelchair user Laurel Lawson was writing a book on dance technique for manual wheelchair dancers as of March 2021. Lawson is concerned that disabled dancers might not receive proper training customized to their bodies and has developed her own pedagogical approach. In her approach she encourages what she call "biomechanical alignment", and she has also designed specialized wheelchairs for dancers from the US and Europe. In 2019, Lawson was one of 31 dance artists to receive a fellowship from Dance/USA for integrating social justice and dance. This was the first time Dance/USA gave awarded fellowship to anyone working in physically integrated dance.

In 2019, The Radio City Rockettes hired the first dancer with a visible disability in the organization's 94-year history. Sydney Mesher, 22 years old at the time she was hired, has symbrachydactyly and so does not have a left hand. She told Good Morning America "...even though I don't consider my disability to be that challenging, I need to be in this position to let others have this [sic] opportunity." Mesher's hiring was novel in the physically integrated dance movement both in that The Rockettes are a commercial dance organization, rather than concert dance, and because they have very strict physical requirements to audition for them. For example, The Rockettes do not consider dancers who do not meet a specific height range and only have a certain number of slots available to women of an exact height within the range. Mesher is able to meet the bar of uniformity because her particular disability does not impact the majority of the choreography and she has found ways to modify movements of her left arm to match closely enough to the other dancers.

== Philosophy ==
The goal of physically integrated dance is to bring disabled people into the norms of concert dance by expanding the movement vocabulary to include the skillsets of people with various disabilities that may effect their mobility or balance or who are missing limbs. Directors and choreographers of physically integrated dance tend to approach the work by looking at the abilities of disabled dancers as additive rather than focusing on what they cannot do. Due to the nature of being integrated, those who choreograph for physical integrated companies may themselves be disabled or not, or works may be created collaboratively with the dancers through improvisation. Judith Smith, former Artistic Director of AXIS Dance Company, has said that outside choreography who set work on the company approach creating the work the same way they would for a company that is not physically integrated.

Adam Benjamin, author of Making an Entrance: Theory and Practice for Disabled and Non-Disabled Dancers (2002), has written about the perhaps unnecessary labelling of a dance performance as "integrated" or "inclusive" dance when advertising it to the public, calling it, "a bit like a roadsign warning the unwary theatre-goer of possible encounters with wheelchairs—it tells us that we can expect to see a disabled person on stage, which can only leave us asking, 'Is that really necessary? Who is it that needs to be warned?'" Part of the reason for this practice may be the breaking of a taboo for some audience members to see bodies in many conditions performing on stage, an event that may create astonishment, among other reactions. Audiences in Western cultures are accustomed to seeing only dancers in peak physical condition when they attend performances at top theatres.

Some disabled dancers say that a flaw of physically integrated dance is that the disabled dancers can be treated "as a prop onstage". Others say that disabled dancers can be turned away from such companies at auditions if their disability is not visible. Not all physically integrated choreography is made by non-disabled people, though some disabled dancers have said that non-disabled choreographers are ill-equipped to make full use of the talents of someone who uses a wheelchair, crutch or cane. Laurel Lawson has said that the overuse injuries normalized in sports and concert dance can take a greater toll on a dancer who is disabled.

Alice Sheppard of Kinetic Light said in March 2021 that she as a disabled dancer she is not out to evangelize to non-disabled people; she sees other disabled people as her primary audience.

"[Disability culture] is more than the constant arguing for justice and the constant explaining of disabled life. ...[It's about] who [we] are ... when we're not justifying our humanity to others."

— Alice Sheppard, Contra* podcast

== Physically Integrated Dance Companies ==
=== AXIS Dance Company ===
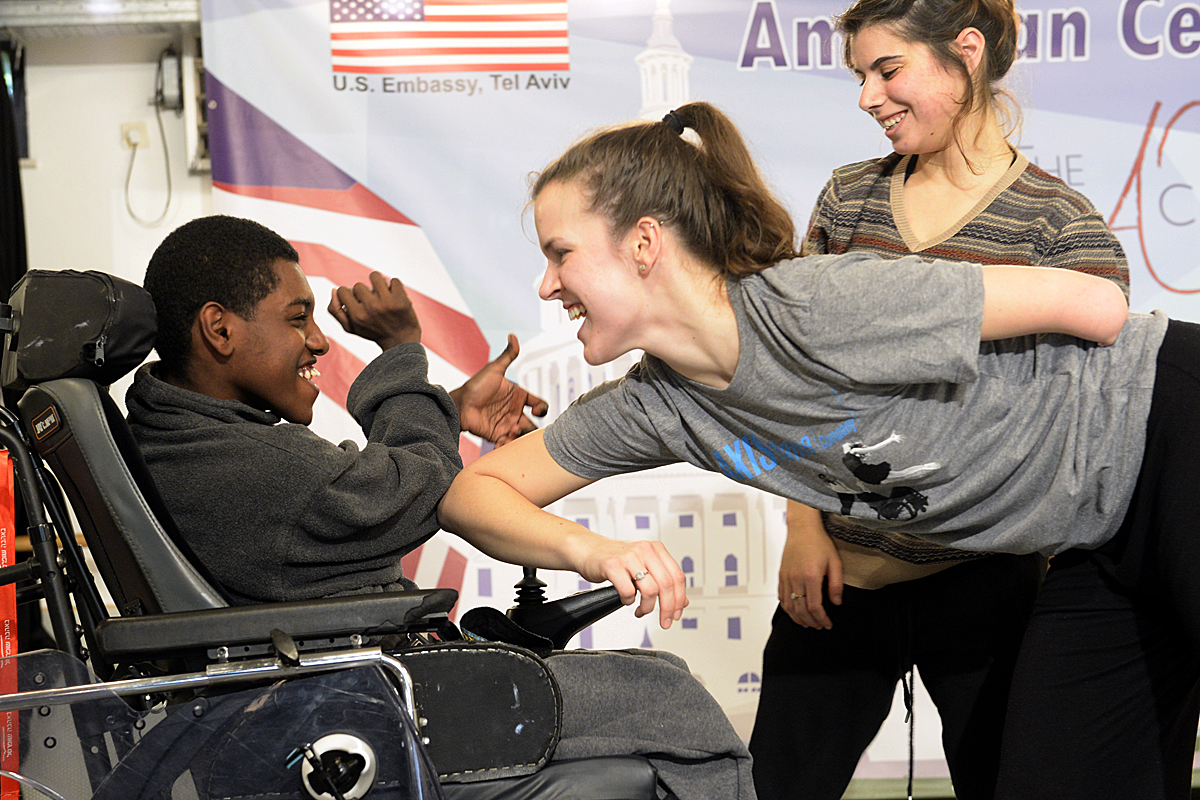
AXIS Dance Company

AXIS Dance Company is a professional contemporary dance company and dance education organization based in Oakland, California. It was founded in 1987 and was one of the first contemporary dance companies in the world to consciously develop choreography that integrates dancers with and without physical disabilities. Their work has received seven Isadora Duncan Dance Awards and nine additional nominations for both their artistry and production values.

=== Candoco Dance Company ===
Candoco Dance Company is a British contemporary dance company of disabled and non-disabled dancers, founded in 1991 by Celeste Dandeker and Adam Benjamin. Dandeker, who had previously trained with the London Contemporary Dance Theatre, fell while dancing on stage. The resulting spinal injury prevented her from dancing until choreographer Darshan Singh Buller persuaded her to dance again, albeit from her wheelchair, for the subsequently award-winning dance film The Fall. From this, Dandeker took inspiration to create Candoco Dance Company, which, since its inception, has been creating an inclusive dance practice.

=== Dancing Wheels ===
The Dancing Wheels Company is a professional dance company based in Cleveland, Ohio. Founded in 1980, it was the first in America to stage performances involving dancers with and without disabilities. The company uses its performances to enhance public awareness of disability issues and promote social change.

=== DV8 Physical Theatre ===
DV8 Physical Theatre was formed in 1986 by an independent collective of British dancers who, they claim, had become frustrated and disillusioned with the preoccupation and direction of most dance. The company has produced 16 dance pieces, which have toured internationally, and 4 award-winning films for television. They are performing works that break down the barriers between dance, theatre, and personal politics and, above all, communicate ideas and feelings clearly and unpretentiously. Dancers and production staff include people with disabilities, for example in the company's film The Cost of Living.

=== Full Radius Dance ===
Full Radius Dance is an American company based in Atlanta, Georgia composed of professional dancers with and without physical disabilities.

=== The GIMP Project ===
The GIMP Project is a New York–based modern dance project by the Heidi Latsky Dance company. The founder of this project is not disabled.

=== Remix Dance Project ===
Remix Dance Project is a South African contemporary dance company that "brings together performers with physical disabilities and performers without." It concentrates on the contemporary dance genre, with its activities focused on education and the creation of "performances that are intriguing and intelligent".

=== Restless Dance Theatre ===
Restless Dance Theatre is a physically integrated dance company based in Adelaide, Australia. The company has three core areas of activity: a community workshop program for small children with intellectual disability, a core performance group of 15- to 26-year-olds with and without disabilities who work in collaboration with professional artists and a touring company of professional dancers.

=== Amici Dance Theatre Company ===
The Amici Dance Theatre Company, founded by Wolfgang Stange in 1980 and based in London, UK, includes dancers with physical and also mental disabilities. The approach of Stange has been described as one that directly incorporates each dancer's unique qualities into the dance:

Where others saw limitation, Stange saw potential. Where others saw a medical condition, Stange saw the possibility of a new form of expression. Like Holger, he believed that the key to performance was honesty: the presentation of the authentic self. Everyone could be honest, so everyone had something to offer.

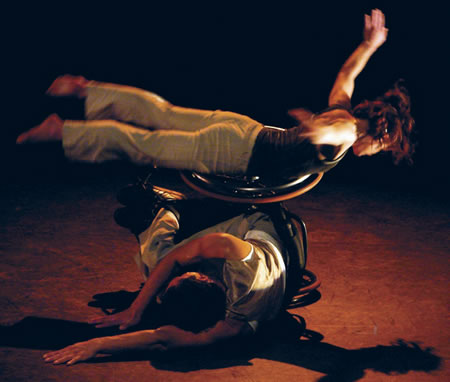
Rodney Bell during performance

=== Touch Compass ===
Touch Compass is a physically integrated dance company based in Auckland established in 1997. As of March 2021, the Interim Artistic Director was Pelenakeke Brown; she is the first disabled person to hold the title in the company's 24-year history. A new leadership group was established at the end of 2021 called the Artistic Direction Panel and Lusi Faiva, Suzanne Cowen and Rodney Bell were appointed.

== See also ==
- Disability in the arts
- Disability Art
