= Alice Sheppard =

British dancer and choreographer

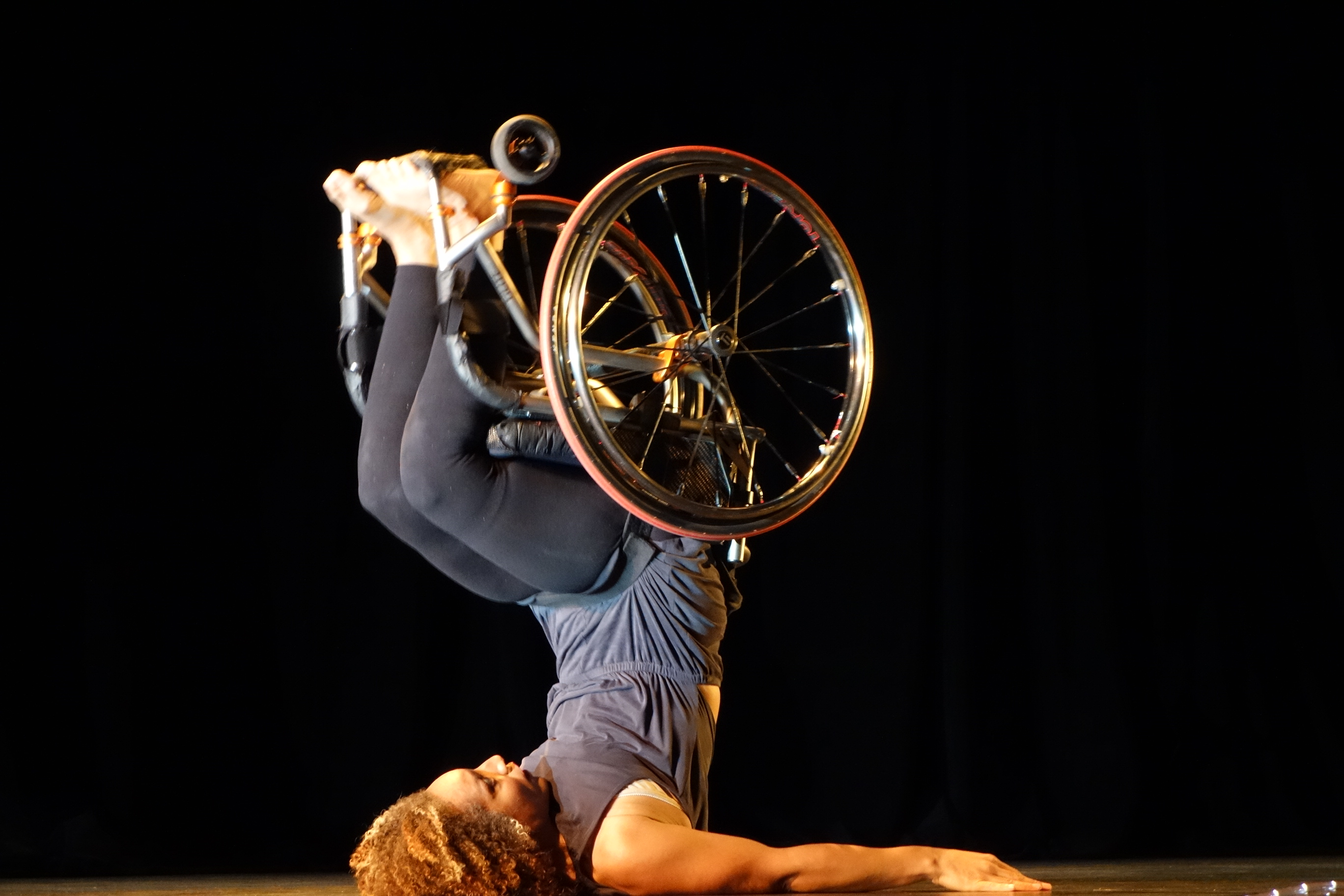
Alice Sheppard performs "So, I Will Wait."

Alice Sheppard is a disabled choreographer and dancer from Britain. Sheppard started her career first as a professor, teaching English and Comparative Literature. After attending a conference on disability studies, she saw Homer Avila performed and was inspired. She became a member of the AXIS Dance Company and toured with them. She also founded her own dance company, Kinetic Light, which is an artistic coalition created in collaboration with other disabled dancers Laurel Lawson, Jerron Herman and Michael Maag, who also does lighting and is a video artist. A lot of Alice's work revolves intersectionality (her being a disabled, queer person of color).

== Biography ==
Sheppard earned a doctorate in medieval studies at Cornell University. She worked as an associate professor of English and Comparative Literature at Pennsylvania State University (PSU). In 2004, she attended a conference on disability studies, where she saw Homer Avila perform. After talking with him at a bar, she took on a dare to take a dance class. At the conference, she also met Simi Linton, who is the creator and co-director of Invitation to Dance, where Linton's own account of disability is intertwined with the stories of others, including Sheppard, whose image graces the cover of the film. According to the other director of the film, Christian von Tippelskirch, "Alice Sheppard...is a central figure [in the film]. She is an amazingly talented, forceful dancer, whether on stage or at a party". The first dance lesson Sheppard took was taught by Kitty Lunn. 2 years later she resigned from her academic professorship, and began her dance career. She continued her dance lessons with AXIS Dance Company, became an apprentice dancer in 2006 and then became a company member in 2007. Alice had studied ballet and modern dance

During her apprenticeship, Alice explored techniques of dancing in a wheelchair and learning how disability can generate its own movement. She learned to listen to her body. Post-apprenticeship, Sheppard toured nationally and taught for the Axis Dance Company in their education and outreach programs. In 2012, she became an independent dancer and has since worked with companies in the United Kingdom and the United States.

Sheppard is a multiracial, queer, Black Briton. She has preferred not to detail the specifics of her disability.

== Career ==
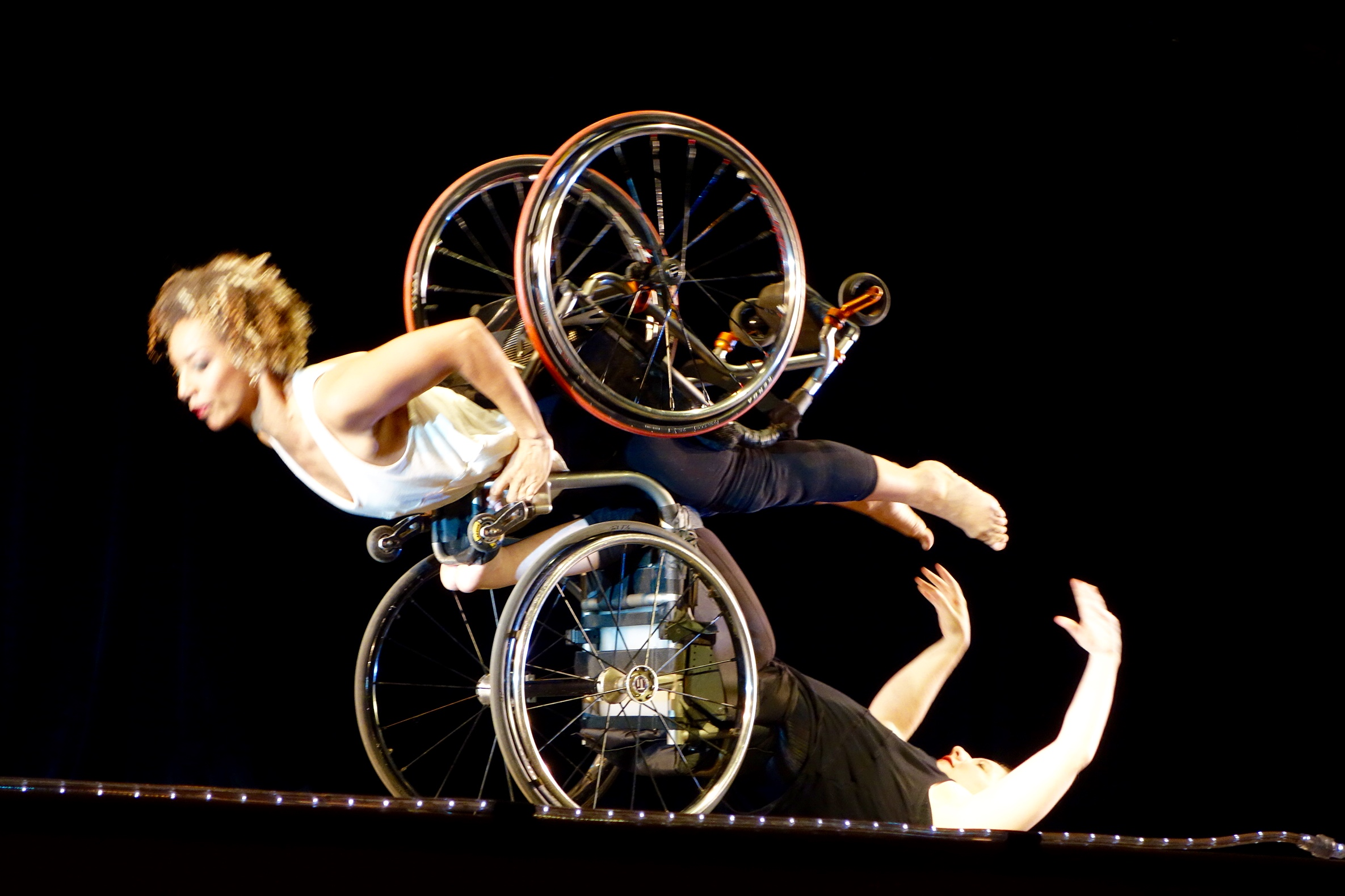
Alice Sheppard and Laurel Lawson perform "Excerpt from Snapshot (Minsky's Burlesque, New Jersey, ca. 1954)," 2015.

In 2014, Sheppard collaborated with GDance and Ballet Cymru to create the performance Stuck in the Mud. The performance was presented as a promenade – an interactive performance where performers guided the audience through a tour of the site. She has also performed with Full Radius Dance in both 2014 and 2015.

In 2017, she collaborated with the Marc Brew Company to create BREWBAND, a performance that combined live rock music with live dance. The show "blurs boundaries between musicians and dancers and challenges audience's perceptions of what live performance is".

In 2017 Sheppard's dance company, Kinetic Light, created a piece entitled Descent (styled in all caps). Performed on an architectural ramp installation, The performance acts out the story of Andromeda and Venus, re-imagined as interracial lovers. Sheppard performed Descent with Laurel Lawson in wheelchairs.

In 2017, Alice Sheppard became one of two 2017-2018 recipients of a fully supported production residencies from Gibney Dance. The award provided resources to develop and stage new works.

In February 2018, Sheppard performed at the ribbon cutting of an additional 10,000 square feet (930 m^{2}) of space at the Gibney Dance Center. She also spoke at the 2018 Dance/NYC Symposium on a panel about growing the field of disability dance in NYC.

In July 2018, she graced the cover of Dance Magazine, credited with "moving the conversation beyond loss and adversity." Sheppard was featured as recently as February 2019 in the New York Times article, "I Dance Because I Can." This article features the work of both Sheppard and fellow artist and member of Kinetic Light, Laurel Lawson. "I Dance Because I Can" emphasizes the connection between "art and social justice", detailing the ways in which Sheppard's work responds to and evolves out of disability culture and aesthetics.

In January 2019, Sheppard was one of 58 artists who were awarded the Creative Capital award.

== Movement style and choreography ==
Alice creates choreography that challenges conventional understandings of disabled and dancing bodies. She engages disability arts, culture, and history. She is intrigued by the intersections of disability, gender, and race. Intersectionality is what leads Alice to collaborating with other artists. Sheppard's dances use her wheelchair as an extension of her body. She also uses crutches in her routines. In 2016, she incorporated the use of ramps, built by engineering students at Olin College. Sheppard also creates choreography that involves sex and sexuality.

Her work doesn't confirm familiar stereotypes of disability. Her work explores the multiple identities she inhabits. Being honest, telling the complicated history and cultures of disability, race, gender, and sexuality. She believes disability is more than the deficit of diagnosis. It is an aesthetic, a series of intersecting cultures, and a creative force. She also believes that movements don't represent triumph over disability

Below is a list of works choreographed by Sheppard.

List of Works	Date
Doors	2013
I Belong to You	2014
So, I Will Wait	2015
Succumb	2016
Re-Membering a World to Come	2016
Trusting If/Believing When	2017
Where Good Souls Fear	2017
Descent	2017
REVEL IN YOUR BODY: a dance film story	2019
INCLINATIONS: a dance film	2019

== Awards and grants ==
- Wynn Newhouse Award (2015)
- Dance/NYC Disability Dance Fund (2017)
- Creative Capital Foundation's MAP FUND (2017)
- New England Foundation for the Arts [NEFA]: The NDP Production grant (2017)
- Dance Magazine's Reader's Choice Award: Most Moving Performance (2018)
- United States Artists Fellowship (2019)
- Creative Capital Award (2019)

== Publications ==
- "Orosius, Old English translation of," in Michael Lapidge, ed., The Blackwell Encyclopaedia of Anglo-Saxon England. Oxford: Basil Blackwell, (1998), pp. 346–347.
- Of This Is a King's Body Made: Lordship and Succession in Lawman's Arthur and Leir (2000)
- "The King's Family: Securing the Kingdom in Asser's Vita Alfredi," Philological Quarterly 80 (2001): pp. 409–439.
- "Noble Counsel No-Counsel: Advising Ethelred the Unready," in Via Crucis: Essays on Sources and Ideas in Memory of J. E. Cross, edited by Thomas N. Hall, Thomas D. Hill, and C. D. Wright. Morgantown: West Virginia University Press, (2002), pp. 393–422.
- "Love Rewritten: Patronizing Meaning and Authorizing History in the Prologue to La3amon's [Layamon's] Brut," Mediaevalia 23 (2002): pp. 99–121.
- Families of the King: Writing Identity in the Anglo-Saxon Chronicle (2004)
- "After Words," PMLA, 120 (2005): pp. 647–641.
- "A Word to the Wise: Thinking and Wisdom in the Old English Wanderer," in Source of Wisdom: Studies in Old English and Insular Latin in Honour of Thomas D. Hill. Charles D. Wright, Frederick M. Biggs, and Thomas N. Hall, eds. University of Toronto Press, (2007). pp. 647–641.

== Academic presentations ==
- "Black Booty" at Spelman College (2010)
- "Showing Spine" at Barnard College (2012)
- "Embodied Virtuosity: Dances from Disability Culture" at Emory University (2014).
- "Practicing Dance: Backstage with a Disabled Dancer" at Arkansas State University and SUNY Geneseo (2014)
- "The Second Annual Longmore Lecture" at San Francisco State University (2015)
- "Trained to Kill: Disability, Race and Dance" at University of Alberta and Georgetown University (2016)
- "Adaptive Gear, Art, Aesthetics" at Olin College (2016)
- "Disability Across Disciplines Symposium" at University of Virginia (2016)
- "Overturning Expectations: Dance and Disability" at 92Y (2017)

== Public speaking ==
- "Does Disability Need Fixing?" at HUBweek (2018)
