= Gimp =

Gimp or GIMP may refer to:

== Science and technology ==
- GIMP (GNU Image Manipulation Program), an open-source image editor
- Great Internet Mersenne Prime Search (GIMPS)

== Clothing ==
- Bondage suit, also called a gimp suit, a type of suit used in BDSM
- Bondage mask, also called a gimp mask, often worn in conjunction with a gimp suit

== Embroidery and crafts ==
- Gimp (thread), an ornamental trim used in sewing and embroidery
- Gimp thread (scoubidou), plastic thread used in crafts such as lanyards

== Arts and entertainment ==
- Gimp (album), by Psylons
- The GIMP Project, a New York dance company
- "The Gimp", a character wearing a bondage suit in the film Pulp Fiction
- "The Gimp (Sometimes)", a song by British experimental band Coil off their 2004 album Black Antlers
- Gimp (gaming), a weak game character

== Other uses ==
- Disabled person (offensive)

== See also ==
- Gimp-Print, a collection of printer drivers
- Martin Snyder (1893–1981), Jewish-American gangster commonly known as Moe the Gimp
