= Hilde Holger =

Austrian-British dancer and choreographer

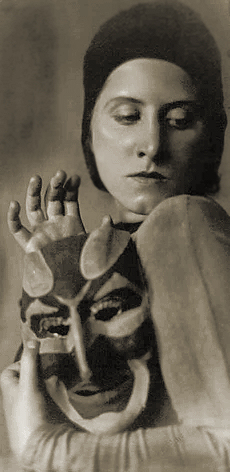
- Holger in 1925
- Born: Hilde Sofer; 18 October 1905; Vienna, Austria-Hungary
- Died: 22 September 2001 (aged 95); Camden, London
- Resting place: Goldner's Green Crematorium
- Known for: Dance, choreography and teaching
- Movement: Expressionism and Integrated dance
- Spouse: Adershir Kavershir Boman-Behram (1940–1975, 1989–2000)
- Website: Official website

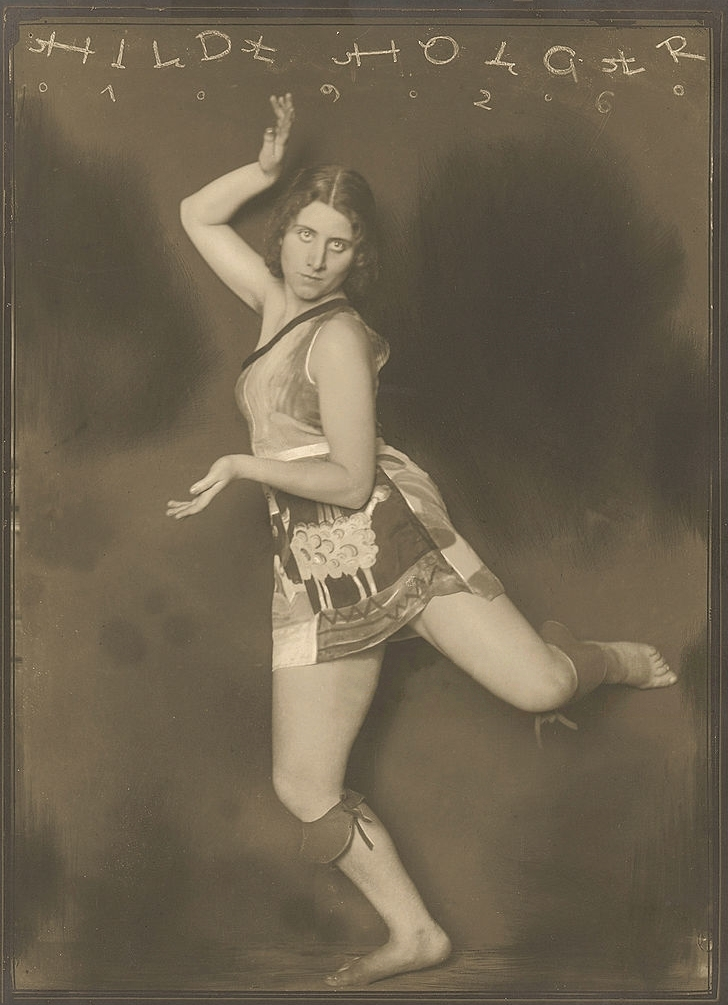
Holger in 1926

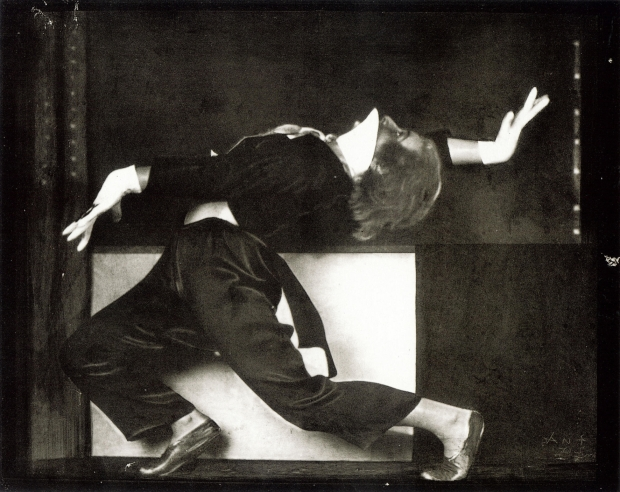
Holger in 1926

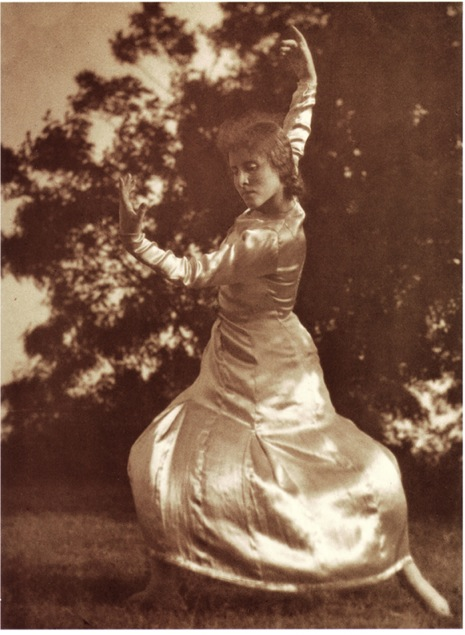
Holger in 1926

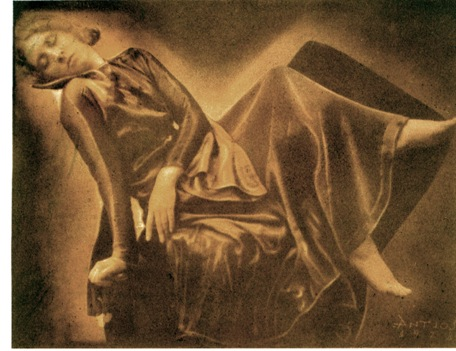
Holger in 1925

Hilde Boman-Behram (née Hilde Sofer, stage name Hilde Holger; 18 October 1905 – 22 September 2001) was an expressionist dancer, choreographer and dance teacher whose pioneering work in integrated dance transformed modern dance.

== Family ==
Holger came from a liberal Jewish family. She was born in 1905, the daughter of Alfred and Elise Sofer Schreiber. Her father wrote poetry, and had died by 1908. Her grandfather made shoes for the Austrian court.

After Nazi Germany invaded Austria, Holger fled Vienna in 1939 to India. In Mumbai, she met the Parsi homeopath and art loving Dr. Ardershir Kavasji Boman-Behram, they married in 1940. Her mother, step-father Heinrich Wohl, and fourteen other relatives all perished in the Holocaust.

Hilde Holger had two children. The first was born 1946 in India, her daughter Primavera Boman-Behram. In 1948, Holger's family emigrated to Britain. Her second child, a son named Darius Boman-Behram, was born in 1949. He had Down syndrome, which inspired Holger to work with disabled people.

== Work ==
Hilde Holger started to dance at age six. At that time she was too young to join the Vienna State Academy of Music and Dramatic Art, so she settled for ballroom dancing lessons taken with her sister (Hedi Sofer), until she was accepted to study with radical dancer Gertrud Bodenwieser, then a professor at the Vienna State Academy. They were admirers of the work of Isadora Duncan and Ruth St. Denis, as well as the artists of the Secession. Holger soon rose to be Bodenwieser's principal dancer and friend, and toured with Bodenwieser's company all over Western and Eastern Europe. She toured with her own Hilde Holger Dance Group as well. At age eighteen she had her first solo performance in the Viennese Secession. Later in the Viennese Hagenbund and theaters in Vienna, Paris and Berlin, her much-lauded expressionist dance caused quite a stir. Because of her passion for dance, in 1926 she formed the New School for Movement Arts in Palais Ratibor, right in the heart of Vienna. Her children's performances were danced in parks and in front of monuments there.

On 12 March 1938, Adolf Hitler's Nazi Germany sent troops into Austria, and adopted a law to unify Germany with Austria. Holger was considered a degenerate artist because she was a Jew, so she continued her work underground. But when she received last minute help from her friend Charles Petrach in India to flee Austria, she left, as she always had a huge interest in Eastern Art. She received help to flee Austria from her friend Charles Petrach.

In India, she had the opportunity to incorporate new experiences into her work, especially the hand movements of Indian dance. Classical Indian dance has over three hundred of them, used to express life and nature. In 1941, Holger founded a new school of dance in Bombay, she took students of all race, religion and nationality without prejudice. Like when she was in Vienna, Holger again took part in the artistic community. Amongst her friends with whom she collaborated were the Indian dancers Rukmini Devi Arundale, Ram Gopal, Madame Menaka and Uday Shankar. Gopal also danced in Holger's school in Bombay. In 1948 because of the partition of India and the growing violence between Muslims and Hindus she emigrated again, this time to Britain.

Once in England, her Holger Modern Ballet Group performed in parks, churches and theaters. She again opened a new dance school, The Hilde Holger School of Contemporary Dance and remained faithful to the adage that a dancer must unite the mind with the body to achieve meaningful art. Her breakthrough in London, 1951, celebrated Holger with the premiere of "Under the Sea", inspired by the composition by Camille Saint-Saens.

In 1972, she performed a piece titled "Man against flood", it was based on the book of the same name written by Chinese Communist Party member Rewi Alley. It was performed at the Commonwealth Institute with music by Chinese composer Yin Chengzong, and included dancers forming a human wall against a flood of water.

Her performance "Apsaras" (1983) explored her experiences in India. In the summer of 1983 she went back to India, where she had been last in the year 1948. There she worked as a choreographer for a large dance group directed by Sachin Shankar.

Holger was particularly proud of her work with the mentally handicapped. She created a form of dance therapy for children who, like her son Darius, have Down syndrome. Holger was the first choreographer who mixed professional dancers with young adults with severe learning disabilities. In 1968 at the Sadler's Wells, Holger orchestrated "Towards the Light", with music by Edvard Grieg. It was pioneering, innovative, and one of the first integrated dance pieces to be seen on a professional stage.

In October 1979 a film of “Inspirations” was shown at the Viennese Theatre Museum as part of “Dance of the Twentieth Century". In 1992, Holger revived four dances from her early repertoire for her student Liz Aggiss, who first performed them, as Vier Tanze, at the Manchester Festival of Expressionism. The pieces were Die Forelle (1923), Le Martyre de San Sebastien (1923), Mechaniches Ballett (1926), and Golem (1937). In the Guardian review, Sophie Constanti wrote that 'Hilde Holger's choreography reaches the British stage at last and triumphs....Together all four pieces danced with great sensitivity and aplomb by Aggiss accompanied by (Billy) Cowie on piano provided a fascinating insight into the lost Ausdruckstanz of central Europe.' In June 1993 the same four solo reconstructions (Golem, Le Martyr de Saint Sebastian, Mechanical Ballet, Die Forelle) were performed at London's Institute of Contemporary Arts (ICA) by Liz Aggiss accompanied by Cowie with Holger in the audience.

== Legacy ==
Hilde Holger left a lasting impression on three generations of dancers and choreographers. While teaching her standards were high and she was not afraid of risk. Atypical for the era, she accepted a wide variety of students including those with disabilities, forgoeing potential prejudice to prioritise the sincerity of her students. One of her students, Wolfgang Stange, continued her work with people with learning difficulties, like Down syndrome and autism, as well as people with physical disabilities. Stange's Amici Dance Theatre Company which was the first physically integrated dance company in Great Britain, which created a performance titled "Hilde" that was performed at the Riverside Theatre in London in 1996, and at the Odeon in Vienna in 1998. This HILDE Performance in Vienna was noticed by the Ballet Master of the Vienna State Opera Ballet, who in turn put a performance on the stage of the Opera House with people with learning disabilities which quickly became a popular and applauded performance.

In her last few weeks Holger still held dance lessons in her basement studio in Camden, London, where she lived for more than fifty years. Her students included Liz Aggiss, Jane Asher, Primavera Boman, Carol Brown, Carl Campbell, Sophie Constanti, Jeff Henry, Ivan Illich, Luke Jennings, Thomas Kampe, Claudia Kappenberg, Cecilia Keen Abdeen, Lindsay Kemp, Anneliese Monika Koch, Royston Maldoom OBE, Juliet Miangay-Cooper, Anna Niman, David Niman, Litz Pisk, Kristina Rihanoff, Kelvin Rotardier, Feroza Seervai, Rebecca Skelton, Marion Stein, Sheila Styles, Jacqueline Waltz and Vally Wieselthier.

== Archive ==
After Holger's death in 2001, her daughter Primavera began a journey of discovering the truth about her own mother's life as a famous dance artist and innovator. She started to collate an archive, with the initial help of Christine Stratford. Sadly, to date, the archive is not on permanent display, although there have been numerous shows that included many of Holger's artifacts.

=== MoveABOUT ===
In 2010, six of Holger's students, Boman, Campbell, Kampe, Maldoom, Stange, and Waltz, reunited together to put on a series of talks and dance workshops at The InterChange Studios in Hampstead Town Hall Centre in north London to commemorate Holger's pioneering work in Inclusive Dance, entitled MoveABOUT: Transformation through movement. Each former student led an inclusive dance workshop to celebrate their own unique style of dance therapy, which Holger helped foster in them. These workshops introduced her work to yet another generation of dancers and interested individuals to her pioneering methods and beliefs in the power of dance, which in her own life crossed many boundaries, cultures, and religions.

== Literature ==
At the age of twenty-nine in 1934, Holger was mentioned in the prestigious Art in Austria almanac Kunst in Österreich: Österreichischer Almanach und Künstleradressbuch which listed all the established names in the Austrian arts scene of that year. Afterwards, she became exiled to India in 1939 but it was not until she had relocated again to settle in London a decade later that she started to be mentioned in many books which included her work and photos of herself as a young dancer.

In 1990 a documentation of her entire life and work, across the borders of Austria, India and Britain entitled Die Kraft des Tanzes, Hilde Holger: Wien – Bombay – London: über das Leben und Werk der Tänzeerin, Choreographin und Tanzpädagogin was published by Zeichen und Spuren Verlag publishers in Bremen.

The three photographers, Anton Josef Trčka, Edward Weston and Helmut Newton explored nature, the body and the artificial, in SCALO's first edition of The Artificial and the Real. She was a frequent model and close personal friend of Trčka.

The Century of Dance, published by the Akademie der Künste in 2019, is a collection of influential pioneers of dance from the twentieth century, like Holger. This volume's scope ranges from Vienna to Berlin between the world wars, from Japanese to American Modern Dance, to New York's Judson minimalist group. It explores the dance art form from various points of view. Dance being ephemeral has no monuments, therefore leading it to be historically weakened in its social recognition in the world.

Alys X. George gives a supplemental and alternative genealogy of Viennese Modernism in The Naked Truth – Viennese Modernism and the Body as demonstrated by Egon Schiele, Arthur Schnitzler, Joseph Roth, Hugo Von Hofmannsthal, and to long overlooked ones like dancers, Grete Wiesenthal, Gertrude Bodenwieser, and Holger herself. It was published in 2019 by the University of Chicago Press.

The Hilde Holger Archive, which is run by founding member Primavera (Holger's daughter), has collated an ever growing list of collected works by Holger or on Holger, as well as visual images of her by photographers.

== Choreography ==
Year	Performance	Music	Venue	Notes
1923	Bouree	Johann Sebastian Bach	Vienna Secession	
1923	Eine Seifenblase	Claude Debussy	Vienna Secession	
1923	Forelle	Franz Schubert	Vienna Secession	
1923	Humoreske	Max Reger	Vienna Secession	
1923	Le Martyre de Saint Sebastien	Claude Debussy	Vienna Secession	
1923	Reiter im Sturm	Siegfried Frederick Nadel	Vienna Secession	
1923	Sarabande	Johann Sebastian Bach	Vienna Secession	
1923	Trout			
1923	Vogel als Prophet	Franz Schubert	Vienna Secession	
1926	Funeral March for a Canary	Lord Berners		
1926	Mechanical Ballet			
1929	Chaconne & Variations	George Frideric Handel		
1929	Englischer Schafertanz	Percy Aldridge Grainger		
1929	Hebraischer Tanz solo	Alexander Veprik		
1929	Lebenswende	Karel Boleslav Jirák		
1929	Marsch	Sergei Sergeyevich Prokofiev		
1929	The Martyrdom of Saint Sebastien	Claude-Achille Debussy		
1929	Mutter Erde	Heinz Graupner		
1929	Sarabande und Bourree	Johann Sebastian Bach		
1929	Tanz nach Rumaischene Motive	Béla Viktor János Bartók		
1931	Javanische Impression	Heinz Graupner		
1933	Kabbalistischer Tanz	Vittorio Rieti		
1936	Ahasver	Marcel Rubin	Volkshochschule, Vienna	
1936	Barbarasong	Weill	Volkshochschule, Vienna	
1936	Engel der Verkündigung	Händel	Volkshochschule, Vienna	
1937	Flämischer Bilderboden	nach Breughel	Volksbildungshaus, Stöbergasse, Vienna	
1937	Golem	Wilckens	Volksbildungshaus, Stöbergasse, Vienna	
1937	Mystischer Kreis	Reti	Volksbildungshaus, Stöbergasse, Vienna	
1937	Orientalischer Tanz	Graupner	Volksbildungshaus, Stöbergasse, Vienna	
1937	Passacaglia	Händel	Volksbildungshaus, Stöbergasse, Vienna	
1937	Tango	Benatzky	Volksbildungshaus, Stöbergasse, Vienna	
1948	Annunciation			
1948	Emperors new Clothes	Wolfgang Amadeus Mozart		
1948	Pavane	Maurice Ravel		
1948	Russian Fairy Tales	Alexander Borodine, Modest Petrovich Mussorgsky		
1948	Selfish Giant			
1948	Tales and Legends in Modern Ballet			
1948	Viennese Waltz	Johann Strauss II		
1952	Dance with Cymbals on the Indian Ocean			
1952	Dance with Tambourines	Fritz Dietrich		
1952	Nocturne	Heinz Graupner		
1952	Slavic Dance	Antonín Dvořák		
1954	Aztec Cult (Sacrifice)			
1954	Barbar the Elephant			
1954	Old Vienna			
1954	Orchid			
1954	Rhythm of the East			
1954	Selfish Giant			
1954	Tibetan Prayer Songs			
1955	Angels			
1955	Dance Etudes			
1955	Galliarde-Siciliano	Ottorino Respighi		
1955	Hoops	Georges Bizet		
1955	Jazz	Heinz Graupner		
1955	Men & Horses	John S. Beckett		
1955	Toccata	Paradies		
1955	Under the Sea	Camille Saint-Saëns	Sadler's Wells Theatre	
1955	Valse Caprice	Aram Khachaturian		
1956	Etude			
1956	Prelude	Johann Sebastian Bach		
1956	Theme and Variations	George Frideric Handel		
1957	Allegro Vivaci	Johann Sebastian Bach		
1957	Bird			
1957	Café Dansant	George Gershwin		
1957	Egypt			
1957	The Hunter and the Geese			
1957	Madonna			
1957	March	Lev Knipper		
1957	Nativity	George Frideric Handel, Franz Schubert, Johann Sebastian Bach		
1957	Sale	Johann Strauss II		
1957	The Toyshop	Aram Khachaturian		
1957	Stranger	Aaron Copland		
1957	Witches Kitchen and Walpurgisnight	Paul Dukas		
1958	Dance Divertissement			
1958	Dance for four Women	Joaquín Turina		
1958	Dance with Bells	John S. Beckett		
1958	Ritual Fire Dance	Manuel de Falla		
1958	Song of the Earth	Antonín Dvořák		
1960	Allegro	Arcangelo Corelli		
1960	Dawn of Life			
1960	The Farmer's Curst Wife	Peter Warlock		
1960	Frankie and Johannie	Peter Warlock		
1960	Imaginary Invalid	Gioachino Antonio Rossini		
1960	Secret Annexe			
1960	West Indian Spiritual			
1961	Dance for Two	Germaine Tailleferre		
1961	Egypt			
1961	The House of Bernarda Alba (The Sisters)	Joaquín Turina		written by Federico Lorca
1961	Metamorphoses	Ovid		
1961	Pierrot	Johann Sebastian Bach		
1963	Dance for Men			
1963	Dream	Wilckens		
1963	Lady Isobel and the Elf Knight	Peter Warlock		
1963	Narcissus (The Image)	Heinz Graupner		
1965	Ballad of the Hanged (Villons Epitaph)			
1965	Cain's Morning			
1965	Canticle of the Sun	Johann Pachebel		
1965	Creation of Adam & Eve	Olivier Messiaen		
1965	Nightwalkers	Olivier Messiaen		
1965	Saint Francis and his Sermon to the Birds			
1968	Angelic Prelude – Inspirations	Giuseppe Torelli		
1968	Salome	Philip Croot		
1968	Towards the Light	Edvard Greig	Sadlers Wells Theatre	
1968	The Wise & Foolish Virgins	Philip Croot		
1970	The Scarecrow			
1971	Snowchild			
1972	Bamboo	Khatshaturian	Commonwealth Institute	
1972	Bauhaus	Erik Satie	Commonwealth Institute	
1972	Embrace	Erik Satie	Commonwealth Institute	
1972	Flight		Commonwealth Institute	
1972	Hieronymus Bosch	Roger Cutts	Commonwealth Institute	
1972	Honoré Daumier		Commonwealth Institute	
1972	The Hypopatic Doctor	Gioachino Antonio Rossini, Franz Schubert	Commonwealth Institute	
1972	Inspirations	Sergei Rachmaninoff, Claude Debussy	Commonwealth Institute	
1972	Man against Flood	Yin Chengzong	Commonwealth Institute	based on book by Rewi Alley
1972	Prelude			
1972	Renaissance, Scene on Earth, Scene on Heaven	Mompou, Gordon Langford, Banchieri	Commonwealth Institute	
1972	Shiva and the Grasshopper	Gordon Langford	Commonwealth Institute	based on the poem by Kipling
1972	Suspension	Maurice Ravel	Commonwealth Institute	
1972	Tranquillity	Alan Hovhaness	Commonwealth Institute	
1972	Tribal Nocturne	Béla Viktor János Bartók	Commonwealth Institute	
1974	Archaic			
1974	Bamboo	Aram Khachaturian		
1974	Egypt	Giuseppe Verdi		
1974	Hieronymus Bosch	Roger Cutts		
1974	The Hunter and the Hunted			
1974	Paul Klee Spring Awakening	Béla Viktor János Bartók		
1974	Renaissance	Federico Mompou		
1974	Spring Awakening			
1975	Inspirations	Sergei Rachmaninoff, Claude Debussy	The Hampstead Theatre	
1975	Mobiles	Alfredo Casella	The Hampstead Theatre	
1975	Paul Klee Spring Awakening	Belá Bartók	The Hampstead Theatre	
1975	Rockpaintings	Roger Cutts	The Hampstead Theatre	
1975	Toulouse Lautrec	Erik Satie	The Hampstead Theatre	
1976	The Park			
1977	Prelude and Chorale	César Franck		
1977	Sacred and Profane Dance			
1979	African Poetry			
1979	Apsaras			
1979	Homage to Barbara Hepworth	Heitor Villa-Lobos		
1979	Prelude	Giuseppe Torelli		
1979	Tower of Mothers	Carl Orff		
1979	Tradisches Ballet			choreographed by Oskar Schlemmer
1979	We are Dancing	Johann Sebastian Bach		
1983	The Bow and Arrow	David Sutton-Anderson	The Hampstead Theatre	
1983	Fishes	David Sutton-Anderson	The Hampstead Theatre	
1983	The Letter	Coleridge	The Hampstead Theatre	
1983	The Manikin	Coleridge	The Hampstead Theatre	
1983	The Penguin Story	David Sutton-Anderson	The Hampstead Theatre	
1983	Pick a Back	Coleridge	The Hampstead Theatre	
1983	Poems on a Boy's Painting	David Sutton-Anderson	The Hampstead Theatre	poems by Ke Yan, pictures by Bu Di
1983	Sea and Sand		The Hampstead Theatre	poems by Rewi Alley
1983	Sea, Clouds, Sparkling Lighthouse, Flames		The Hampstead Theatre	
1983	Umbrellas		The Hampstead Theatre	poems by Bu Di and Ke Yan
1983	What is a Poem	David Sutton-Anderson	The Hampstead Theatre	
1984	The City	Marcel Rubin	The Hampstead Theatre	
1984	Don Quixote	David Sutton-Anderson	The Hampstead Theatre	
1984	Ritual	David Sutton-Anderson	The Hampstead Theatre	
1984	Scherzo	Frédéric Chopin		
1988	Children of the Vorstadt	Franz Lehár	The Hampstead Theatre	
1988	Children's Games			
1988	Death and the Maiden	Franz Schubert	The Hampstead Theatre	
1988	Egon Schiele in Memoriam, The Dying Empire	Strauss	The Hampstead Theatre	
1988	The Family	Hugo Wolf	The Hampstead Theatre	
1988	Flemish Picture Sheet			
1988	Fluteplayers			
1988	Four Seasons	Antonio Vivaldi	The Hampstead Theatre	
1988	Golem	Wilckens		
1988	Hands	David Sutton-Anderson	The Hampstead Theatre	
1988	The Least is the Most	Percussion: David Sutton-Anderson	The Hampstead Theatre	
1988	Mechanical Ballet	Ludwig Hirschfeld Mack		
1988	Models	Schubert, Schönberg	The Hampstead Theatre	
1995	Whales			
2000	Rhythms of the Unconscious Mind			

== Filmography ==
=== Film ===
Year	Title	Role	Notes
1933	Die Stadt		composer Marcel Rubin
1979	Inspirations	choreographer	commissioned by British Council, Marylin Halford & Viennese Theatre Museum
1990	A Life of Dance	herself	15 minutes, Simon Eldon
1996	Spirit Levels	herself	5.36, Short film, Emma Grace
1999	One Day at Hilde's Class	herself	60 minutes, Go Nonaka
2002	Hilde Holger: School of Contemporary Dance	herself, posthumous production	Short documentary film. Footage from 1999.
2010	HILDE her legacy		Inclusive Dance, 60 minutes, Alan Bowyer workshops
2023	HILDE		her life story, 5 minutes, Primavera Boman
2024	HILDE HOLGER		her life and work, 30 minutes, Primavera Boman
