= Laurel Lawson =

Modern dancer

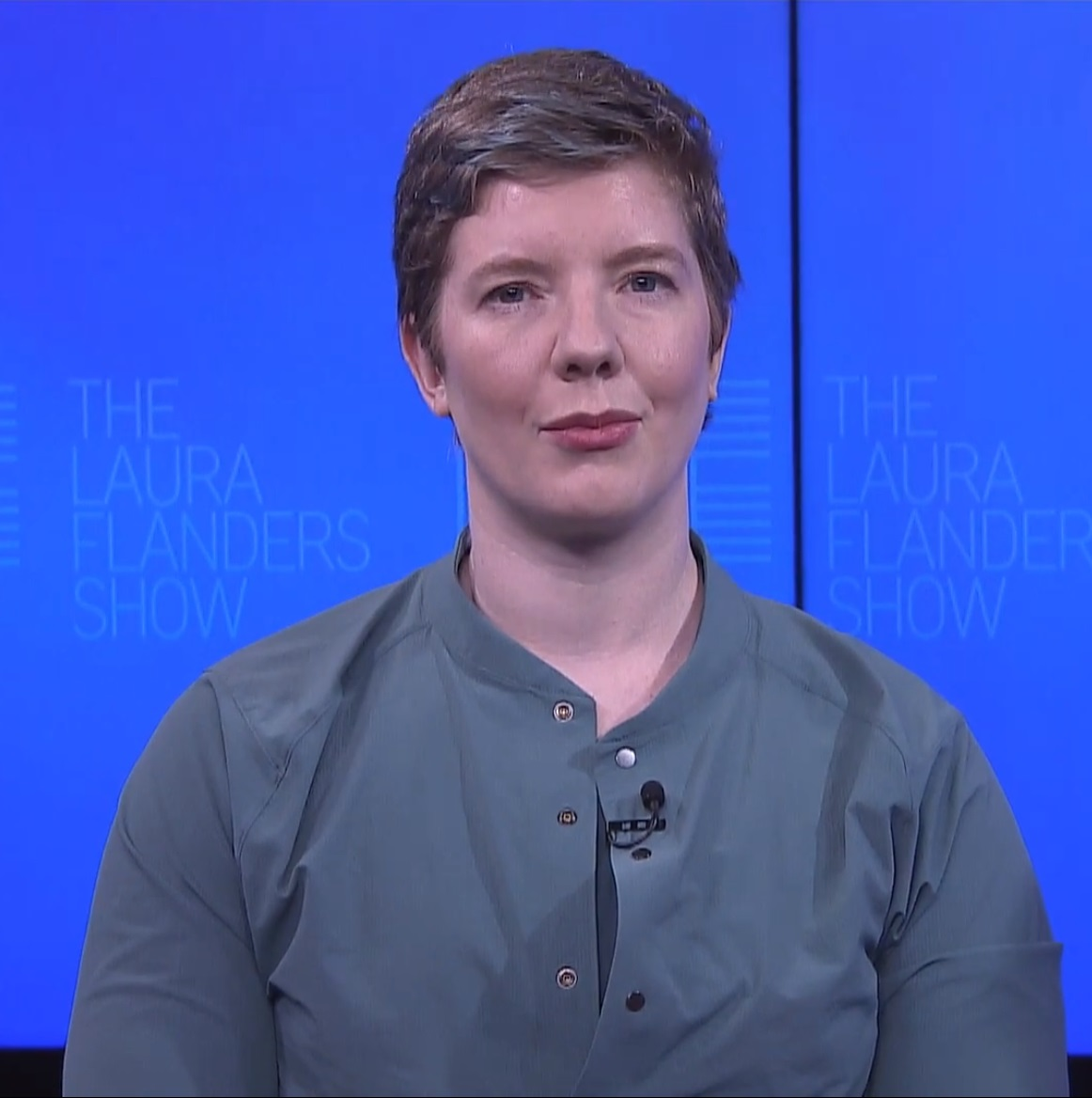
- Lawson on The Laura Flanders Show in 2019
- Born: February 8, 1980 (age 45)
- Occupation: Dancer

Laurel Lawson (born February 8, 1980) is a modern dancer who performs, choreographs, and teaches dance for dancers in wheelchairs.

Lawson became a member of the Full Radius Dance company in 2004 and is currently a member of the Kinetic Light dance collective.

Lawson is best known for her role in Descent, a dance performance by Kinetic Light. This queer and interracial love story was inspired by the stories of Venus and Andromeda. The duet takes place on a stage-scale ramp, on which Lawson and Alice Sheppard dance, often with one of them lying on their back and the other perched on top of the other, while their wheels spin. The ramp references accessibility ramps but uses this symbol as a point of departure for exploring movement. The large ramp is 6 feet (1.8 m) high and covers a 15 x 24-foot (4.6 x 7.3 m) area of the stage.

Descent premiered at the Britt Music & Arts Festival in Oregon in 2017. It was performed at New York Live Arts in 2018 and EMPAC in 2019, where the artists were in residence. Lawson and Sheppard have performed at the Whitney Museum of American Art and been commissioned by The Shed to create a new performance for their 2019 season. Lawson and Sheppard have held residencies at the Maggie Allesee National Center for Choreography and Gibney Dance. The collective was also invited to perform at Jacob's Pillow's Inside/Out. Lawson was a 2019 Dance/USA Artist Fellow.

Lawson attended the Georgia Institute of Technology for undergraduate studies from 1996 to 2001. She is a member of the USA Women's Developmental Sled Hockey team and the product designer and co-founder of an engineering consultancy based in Decatur, Georgia. Lawson lives in Tucker, near Atlanta.

Lawson was among the plaintiffs who sued Atlanta on June 11, 2018, for noncompliance with the Americans with Disabilities Act (ADA) over inaccessible public sidewalks, saying "The damage to our sidewalks makes it impossible to pass certain locations without going off the sidewalk and going in the streets. I have fallen, I have risked injury and I've come to places where I've been stranded and simply unable to pass." The lawsuit has yet to be settled.

Her disability is congenital but unspecified, yet she was described as paraplegic in the complaint.
