= Douglas Scott (choreographer) =

American choreographer

Douglas Scott is an American artistic director, choreographer and dancer. Scott has received numerous awards for his work and is the founder and Artistic Director of Full Radius Dance.

Scott founded Dance Force, a traditional modern dance company, in 1990. He began working with dancers with disabilities in 1993, leading to the founding of Full Radius Dance as a physically integrated modern dance company. He is also the founder of the Modern Atlanta Dance Festival, which has been produced annually since 1995 to critical and popular acclaim.

== Work ==
As the primary choreographic voice for Full Radius Dance, Scott has created numerous dance works that have been premiered by the company. In 2001, he received from the City of Atlanta the Mayor's Fellowship in the Arts for Dance and was named Creative Loafing Critic's Choice: Best Dance Choreographer. In 2004, he again received a Critic’s Choice award for his work As the Horizon Fades. Scott’s work Crawl/Climb was picked by Creative Loafing as one of 2005’s “Top 6 Dance Performances”. Walking On My Grave (2012) was cited by dance critic Cynthia Bond Perry as casting "an eerie glow of macabre beauty."

In 2005, Scott choreographed "I Won't Dance" for the HBO film "Warm Springs", starring Kenneth Branagh, Cynthia Nixon, and Kathy Bates. In the film, three current or former Full Radius Dance company members (Margo Gathright-Dietrich, Teal Sherer and Laurel Lawson) are featured in a song & dance with Felecia Day.

In 2014, Scott was honored with a Governor’s Award for the Arts & Humanities. Presented by the Office of the Governor in partnership with Georgia Council for the Arts and the Georgia Humanities Council, the Governor’s Awards pay tribute to the most distinguished citizens and organizations that have demonstrated a lifetime commitment to work in the arts and humanities in Georgia. Scott was cited as “a respected leader” and for expanding “the definition and reach of modern dance."
