= Rodney Bell =

New Zealand dancer

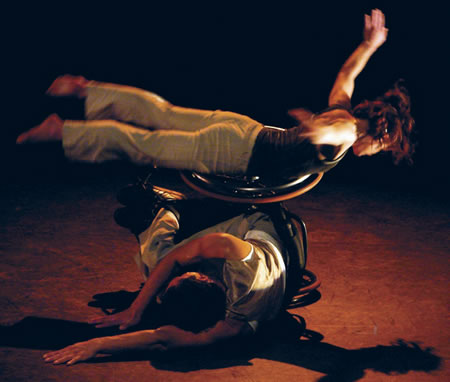
AXIS Dance Company members Sonsherée Giles and Rodney Bell perform an award-winning dance piece by Joe Goode in 2008.

Rodney Bell (born February 6, 1971) is a male dancer born in Te Kūiti, North Island, New Zealand.

Rodney is internationally famous for physically integrated dance, which is a contemporary modern dance style that combines people with and without physical disabilities. He is of Maori descent, from the Ngāti Maniapoto tribe.

Rodney acquired a disability as a result of a motorcycle accident as a young adult. Specifically, the accident left him paralyzed from below the chest, and he depends upon a wheelchair for mobility. His artistic expression demonstrates elements of traditional Maori culture, yet at the same time he's continually seeking new ways to enhance his creative process.

Rodney has been dancing professionally since 1994. He began as a founding member of Touch Compass Dance Trust, which is an internationally renowned physically integrated dance company based in Auckland, New Zealand. In 2007, he relocated to California, U.S., to join AXIS Dance Company, based in Oakland, where he remained principal dancer until 2012.

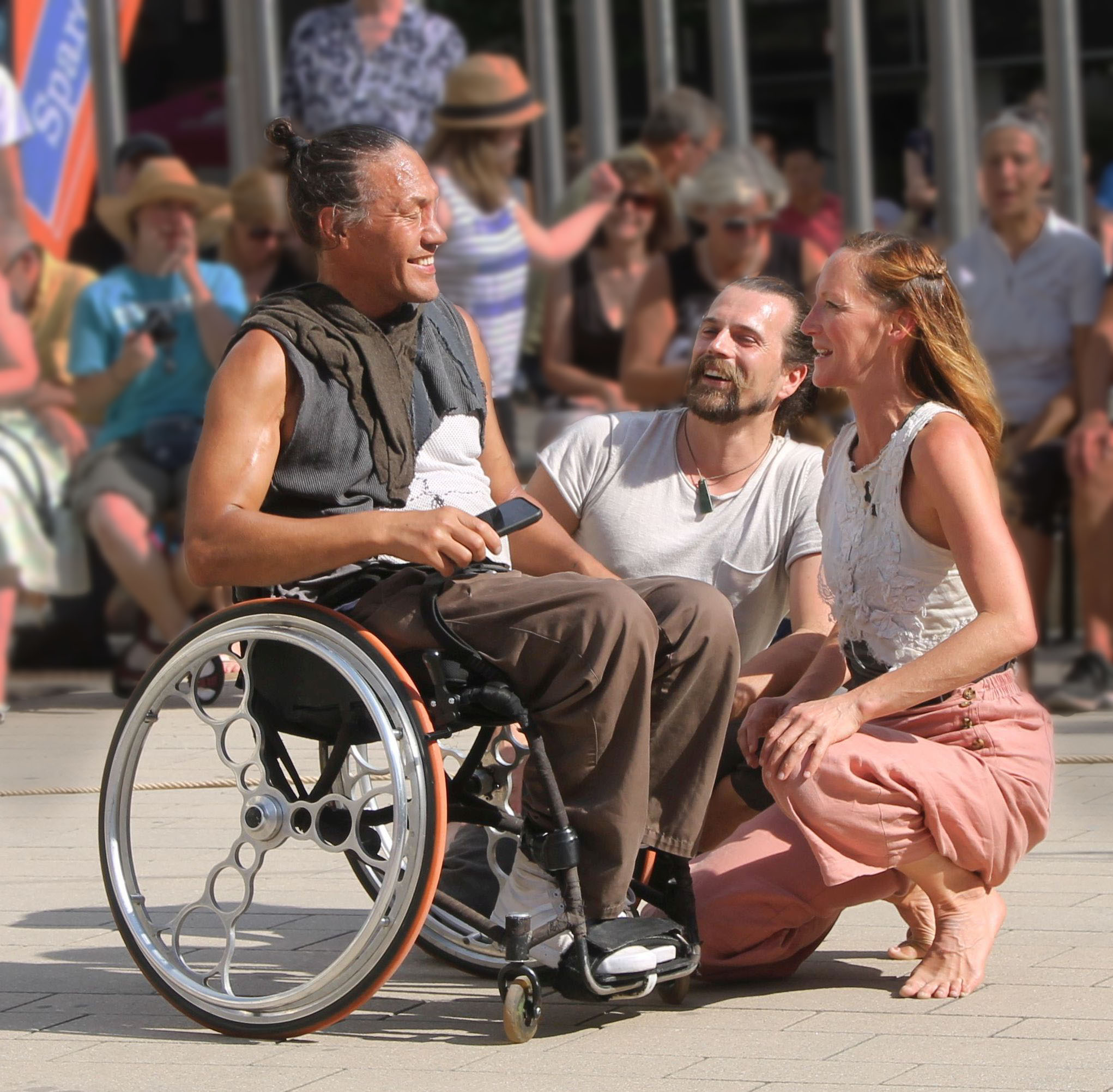
Dancers Rodney Bell (l.) and Chloe Loftus (r.) with rigger Gregor Kolbe (m.) after The Air Between Us performance at the street festival in Kaiserslautern in 2024

Rodney has been nominated for numerous awards. He won an Isadora Duncan Dance Award in 2008 for an ensemble performance with Sonsherée Giles titled "To Color Me Different," performed under AXIS Dance Company, choreographed by Alex Ketley (artistic director of The Foundry). In 2011, he appeared with Sonsherée Giles on So You Think You Can Dance where he performed the duet "To Color Me Different."

Rodney has increasingly worked across all forms of media, including film, commercials, modeling, and fashion catwalks. He teaches dance to disabled and non-disabled dancers through workshops and dance intensives. In 2008, he was in the documentary The Art of Movement which was directed by David Levitt Waxman. In 2009, he modeled for Vale (a mining company in Brazil); and in 2010, he did a commercial for Liberty Mutual, San Francisco, California. In March 2013, he was nominated for an Isadora Duncan Dance Award for an ensemble performance with Sonsherée Giles titled "Full of Words", performed under AXIS Dance Company, choreographed by Marc Brew.

Rodney is currently one of three members of Touch Compass's Artistic Direction Panel.

In 2024 Bell co-choreographed a work called Imprint in the New Zealand Dance Company programme Whenua. Collaborators include choreographer Malia Johnston, sound designer Eden Mulholland and designer Rowan Pierce.

== Awards ==
- 2008 - Isadora Duncan Dance Award
- 2022 - FAME Mid-Career Award (FAME Trust)

== See also ==
- List of dancers
