= Amara Tabor-Smith =

American choreographer and performer

Amara Tabor-Smith (born 1965) is a San Francisco Bay Area-based choreographer and performer noted for significant contributions to dance that draw on, celebrate, and reconfigure African-American and women's history.

== Career ==
Tabor-Smith spent a decade as a dancer, then Associate Artistic Director with the internationally acclaimed Urban Bush Women dance company of New York City, where she was a part of developing the company's early community engagement methodologies. As founder of Deep Waters Dance Theater, she creates choreographic work rooted in ritual and exploring issues facing people of color and the environment. Her 2011 work Our Daily Bread - which explored what and how we eat - included live cooking and eating and was described as "a theatrically cogent, emotionally rich piece of dance theater that made us laugh at ourselves and want to scream at the end."

Tabor-Smith won a San Francisco Guardian 2013 Best of the Bay award for He Moved Swiftly But Gently Down the Not Too Crowded Street: Ed Mock and Other True Tales in a City That Once Was, which consisted of 11 site-specific performances that journeyed through the life of Bay Area dance pioneer Ed Mock. "Everybody's saying the feisty, freaky soul of San Francisco is dying," the SF Guardian wrote. "Finally someone did something about it, in the form of resurrecting one of the city's most treasured cult arts figures. ...You could feel Mock smiling fearlessly, glorious in a giant pink tutu, back on the streets."

Tabor-Smith has performed in the works of a number of noted choreographers, many of whom inform her own work. These include Ed Mock, Joanna Haigood of Zaccho Dance Theatre, Pearl Ubungen, Ronald K. Brown, Liz Lerman, Faustin Linyekula, Anne Bluethenthal, Adia Tamar Whitaker and Sara Shelton Mann. She has also performed in the works of theater artists Anna Deavere Smith, Aya de Leon, Herbert Siquenza, The SF Mime Troupe, and Marc Bamuthi Joseph. Tabor-Smith choreographed and appeared as a dancer in Shakti Butler's documentary film Making Whiteness Visible. Her work with DWDT and Headmistress has been performed at Espaço Xisto in Salvador, Bahia; Rue Danse Festival in Brazzaville, Congo; Judson Memorial Church and Movement Research in New York City as well as many venues throughout the San Francisco/Bay Area.

== Awards and recognition ==
Tabor-Smith has received numerous grants and residencies, including Creative Work Fund's Performing Arts Grant, The Headlands Center for the Arts artist in residence, CHIME Mentorship Exchange grant, Green Choreographers Residency at Dance Exchange. She is currently Artist in Residence at ODC/Dance in San Francisco. She received a Creative Capital award in 2016 with artist Ellen Sebastian Chang. Tabor-Smith received the Rainin Arts Fellowship (formerly The Rainin Fellowship) in 2021.
