= Touch Compass =

Disability-led professional performing arts organisation in Aotearoa New Zealand

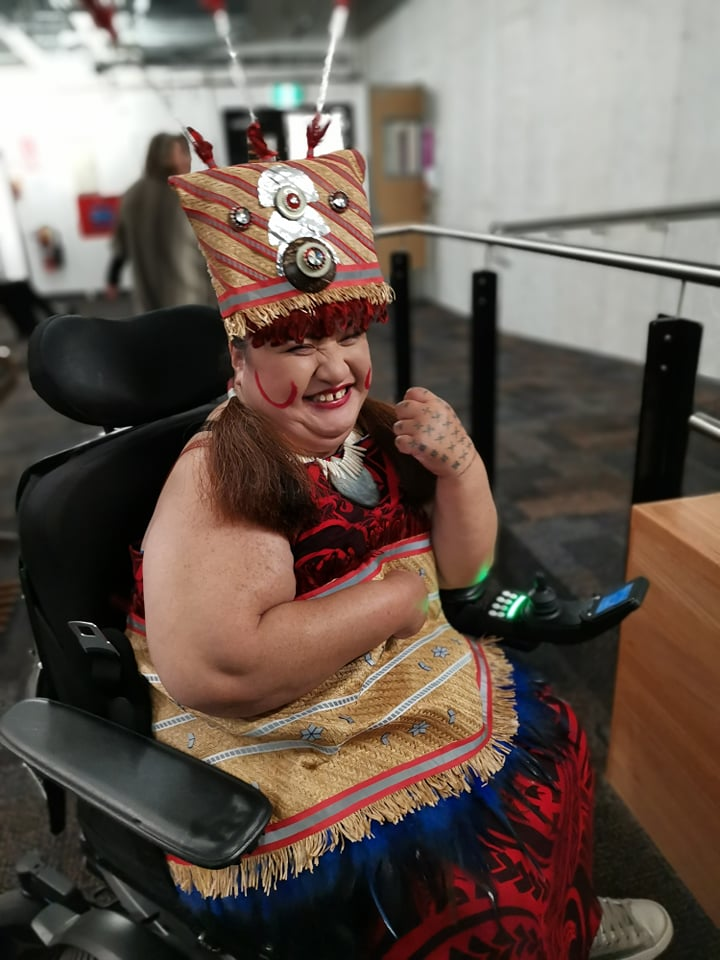
- Lusi Faiva - founding member and current Artistic Direction Panel member of Touch Compass
- Formation: 1997
- Founder: Catherine Chappell MNZM
- Purpose: Professional arts and accessible education organisation whose work is disability-led.
- Headquarters: Auckland, New Zealand
- Leader: Executive Director/Kaiwhakahaere Matua: Jon Tamihere-Kemeys, Artistic Directors: Rodney Bell, Dr Suzanne Cowan and Lusi Faiva (appointed 2021), Alisha McLennan Marler (appointed 2025)
- Website: https://www.touchcompass.org.nz/

Touch Compass is a professional disability-led arts and accessible education organisation in New Zealand established in 1997 as a disability-integrated dance company. They have been at the forefront of access arts, dance and theatre in New Zealand and have 'paved the way for many dancers and performers and companies across the country.' They create contemporary dance, theatre and digital performances, accessible arts education programmes and have run workshops, weekly community classes and education for schools.

== Organisation ==
Touch Compass was established in 1997 and has been a registered charity under the name The Touch Compass Dance Trust Board since 2008. They are based in Auckland.

Their mission statement includes:

Our mission is to explore the intersection of disability, Māori and Pasifika culture as our unique contribution to the arts. Our performances reflect disability aesthetics and practices that are culturally informed. They are interdisciplinary but rooted in movement practice and choreographic forms. We explore cultural diversity through authentic and multi-dimensional performance.

Touch Compass recognise principles of Te Tiriti O Waitangi and in 2019 the organisation after a review made an agreement to 'move to a disability-led business model, in which artists with disabilities hold leadership positions'.

== People ==
Founder of Touch Compass and director for over 20 years is Catherine Chappell MNZM. Chappell brought with her a background in contact improvisation and from the first performance the company created work that involved aerial techniques, with performers suspended above the stage. During her directorship many new works were brought to New Zealand and international stages.

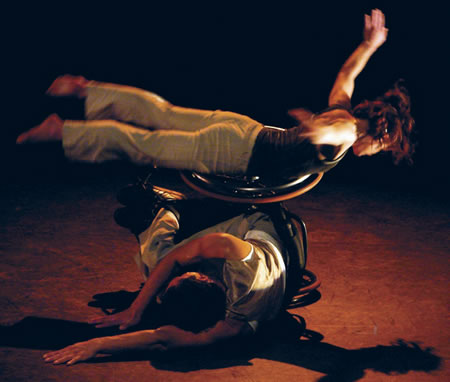
Rodney Bell & Sonsherée Giles performing with AXIS Dance Company

Chappell left at the end of 2019 and Pelenakeke Brown was appointed as interim director. Brown had been in the company when she was young from 1997 to 2000. Brown is an interdisciplinary artist with a disability who had been based in New York for six years. Brown is of Samoan and Pākehā heritage. Following Brown, in 2021 Rodney Bell, Suzanne Cowan and Lusi Faiva were appointed to the Artistic Direction Panel. Rodney Bell was introduced to dance by Chappell. He was another dancer that left and came back as he was also a founding dancer. After several years with Touch Compass in 2007 he went to California and joined AXIS Dance Company where he created acclaimed work. Lusi Faiva was also a founding dancer of Touch Compass, and has featured in and developed lots of work with the company included her solo Lusi's Eden.

The first work programmed by Bell, Cowan and Faiva on the new Artistic Development Panel was the 25th Anniversary performing arts festival hybrid-event that took place on 15 February 2022 called /rītaha/. People the company has collaborated with include BodyCartography Project's Olive Bieringa and Otto Ramstad, composer Claire Cowen, choreographers Carol Brown and Sarah Foster Sproull.

Touch Compass dancers over time have included Alex Smithson, Duncan Armstrong, Tess Connell, Rodney Bell, Suzanne Cowan, Lusi Faiva, Daniel King, Eden Mulholland and Julia Milsom. The dancer Jesse Johnstone-Steele won the Arts Access PAK’nSAVE Artistic Achievement Award at the Te Putanga Toi Arts Access Awards in 2018. He has been 17 Touch Compass seasons.

== Works include ==
Lusi’s Eden first performed 2001, remount 2002 and for Touch Compass’ tenth birthday celebrations 2007

Lighthouse

DanceBox - short film series

Triple Bill

Acquisitions (2015) - multi-media contemporary dance

Somatechnics (2017) - with dancers Lusi Faiva, Rodney Bell, Alisha McLennan Marler, Julie Van Renen and Duncan Armstrong.

I’mPaired (2019) - with a programme of work including Clasp!, (co-creators Alisha McLennan Marler & Georgie Goater, performers, Alisha McLennan Marler, Julie Van Renen), Drift (film), (choreographer Sarah Foster Sproull, performers Julie van Renen, Rodney Bell), The Language of Colour, (by dancer Julie van Renen and artist Yung Chen), Rhythms of Sameness, (performers Duncan Armstrong and Mabingo Alfdaniels), and duets by Touch Compass's hip hop crew Integr8.

AIGA (2024)
