= Amici Dance Theatre Company =

The Amici Dance Theatre Company, founded by Wolfgang Stange in 1980 and based in London, UK, is a physically integrated dance company which includes dancers with physical and also mental disabilities. The company are the community artists in residence at the Lyric Hammersmith theatre.

The approach of Stange has been described as one that directly incorporates each dancer's unique qualities into the dance:

Where others saw limitation, Stange saw potential. Where others saw a medical condition, Stange saw the possibility of a new form of expression. Like Holger, he believed that the key to performance was honesty: the presentation of the authentic self. Everyone could be honest, so everyone had something to offer.

Stange was inspired by his dance teacher, Hilde Holger. Holger, a Viennese-trained dancer, taught dance to her son, who had Down syndrome. In 1968, she used her experience teaching her son to mount a production with both physically and mentally disabled dancers. The dance piece, titled Towards the Light, was performed at the prestigious Sadler's Wells Theatre.

== Repertoire ==
Some of the notable works by the company include:

Title	Choreographer
Tightrope 2010	Wolfgang Stange
Elegy 2007	Wolfgang Stange
Stars are out Tonight 2005	Wolfgang Stange
Timestep 2005	Wolfgang Stange
Breaking Out 2005	Bill Robins
The Chosen 2005	Wolfgang Stange
Untitled 2005	Carol Britten
Odd One Out 2005	Wolfgang Stange
