= Ed Mock =

Ed Mock (c.1938–April 25, 1986) was a San Francisco-based dancer, teacher, and choreographer, whose style and teaching influenced future generations of dancers and artists. Most active through the 70s and 80s, Mock founded and ran the West Coast Dance Company (1974–1979) and Ed Mock Dancers (1980–1985), as well as the Ed Mock Dance Studio.

Born in Chicago, Mock trained with dancers Jimmy Payne and Anna Nassif, and was later influenced by Lester Horton, Katherine Dunham, and a mix of jazz traditions. He became known both as a solo performer and as a choreographer. As a soloist, Mock specialized in improvisation, mixing modern dance with mime, storytelling, and voice.

In 1986, Mock was elected to the Bay Area Dance Coalition Hall of Fame, and received the "Dance Teacher of the Year Award."

On April 25, 1986, Mock died of an AIDS-related illness.

In 2013, Amara Tabor-Smith, a Bay-Area choreographer who studied and danced with Mock from the age of 14, created the multi-venue He Moved Swiftly But Gently Down the Not Too Crowded Street: Ed Mock and Other True Tales in a City That Once Was. The piece wandered through the city June 15 and June 21–23.

In 2016, Lynne Redding published a book of black and white photographs taken during 1980-1984 of Mock and his dance company in the studio, in rehearsal and in performance. Included in the book is an essay by Burr Snider.

In 2018, Brontez Purnell, who was introduced to Mock while dancing with Tabor-Smith, directed Unstoppable Feat, The Dances of Ed Mock, a documentary film. In the trailer, Purnell states, "As a gay man, as a black man, it was really comforting to know that I had an ancestor." View the film at Vimeo.

== List of Works ==
- The Blacks 1973, University of California, Berkeley
- Festival of Fools 1980, Florence, Italy
- Black Mischief 1981, Venice, Italy
- Holiday Spice 1981, Victoria Theatre, San Francisco
- The Day Aunt Ada Came to Town 198?
- While Sheila Waits 198?
- Tight Like That 1985, Footwork Studio, San Francisco

== Bibliography ==
- Rosenberg, Ruth, "Eulogy to Ed Mock." San Francisco's Bay Dance Coalition publication In Dance (June 1986)
- Ross, Janice, Dance Magazine obituary (August 1986)
- Snider, Burr, "Top Dancer, Instructor Dies of AIDS", San Francisco Examiner (27 April 1986)
- Tircuit, Heuwell, "The Delightful Footwork of Ed Mock and Company", San Francisco Chronicle (7 October 1985)
- Tircuit, Heuwell, "An Evening of Mock Dance", San Francisco Chronicle (5 December 1981)
- Snider, Burr, Essay appearing in "ED MOCK and Company DANCE-Photographs 1980-1984 by Lynne Redding" (October 2016)
