= Pelenakeke Brown =

New Zealand artist

Pelenakeke Brown is a multi-disciplinary New Zealand artist. In 2019 she was awarded the Disability Dance Artistry Award by Dance/NYC, and was recognised for her work through Creative NZ's Arts Pasifika Awards with the Pacific Toa award in 2020.

== Career ==
Brown was 9 years old when she became a founding member and company dancer for Touch Compass. Her involvement lasted from 1997 to 2000, when she left to focus on her schooling. After secondary school, Brown studied at the University of Auckland (2007–2010), completing a bachelor of arts in Pacific studies and English literature. In 2011, she undertook the Be Leadership programme with Be Lab, a New Zealand accessibility organisation. About the programme, Brown stated “Everyone has the potential to be a great leader and the Be.Leadership programme has helped me realize that I could be one too.”

After completing her undergraduate study and spending some time in the work force, Brown left New Zealand to continue studies in New York, moving in 2013 and studying at the National Academy School of Fine Arts completing the Studio Intensive Programme in 2016.

Brown's work is embedded in the Samoan concept Vā'.

Vā centers spatial relationships as a way to understand and move in the world. In my art practice, this translates to interrogating relationships, how we relate to ourselves, each other. I am fascinated with the in-between spaces and how our in-between spaces inform the way we navigate the world. (Brown)

Brown has exhibited work across the United States of America, in California, New York and San Francisco and in Germany, London, and New Zealand. She has been published in the James Franco Review, Apogee Journal, Movement Research Performance Journal and the Hawai'i Review.

Brown spent six and a half years based in New York, where she engaged in choreography, movement, dance, curation, visual arts, writing, and storytelling. She has collaborated with The Metropolitan Museum of Art, New York Public Library, Goethe Institute and Gibney Dance Centre for projects. She has held art residencies in New York, Vermont and New Zealand. She returned to Auckland, New Zealand in mid-2019 and took up the role of artistic director at Touch Compass the following year, becoming the first disabled artist to lead the company in its twenty four years of operation.

In 2020, Brown collaborated with artist Yo Yo Lin and co-founded Rotations, "a dance collaborative movement working towards deepening and challenging our understanding of artistry, disability, and access".

Brown was the keynote speaker for the Christchurch Tiny Fest in 2021; writer Kosta Bogoievski described Brown's talk as 'an emotional opening, as festivals can be but Tiny Fest happens to be, in 2021, one of the last live performance festivals standing in the country'.

In March 2022, Brown was part of an online panel discussion for Te Tairāwhiti Arts Festival wānanga series Te Ara i te Matihiko Toi, to discuss access, inclusion and participation within the performing arts.

In 2022 Brown is one of the panel members evaluating proposals to the Innovation Fund at the New Zealand Ministry of Culture and Heritage. Other panel members are W. Gary Nicholas and Ian Barrs.

== Performances ==
Year	Show/Company	Role	Location	Ref.
1997- 2000	Touch Compass Dance Trust	Company Dancer	NZ	
2017	A Remedy for a Constitutional Crisis (Abrons Art Center)	Performer	NYC. NY	
2017	Boogie on the Boulevard (Bronx Museum of the Arts)	Performer	Bronx, NY	
2018	Excavātion (Denniston Hill Open House)	Performer	Woodridge, NY	
2018	Sunshower (Yuko Uchida, Ideal Glass Studio)	Performer	NYC, NY	
2019	Down In The River Judson Memorial Church	Performer	NY	
2019	Excavātion: An Archival Process (Gibney Dance Center)	Performer	NY	
2020	WITH (Tanzplattform supported by the Goethe Institute)	Performer	Munich, Germany	
2022	Vā Moana Conference (Auckland University of Technology, online)	Artist actiVAtor	Auckland, NZ	

== Solo exhibitions ==
Year	Title	Organisation	Location	Ref.
2017	Reasoning on Paper: The Myth Of Herself	ORA Gallery	NYC, NY	
2017	In Conversation with Line	Sonia Gechtoff Gallery	NYC, NY	

== Group exhibitions ==
Year	Title	Organisation	Location	Ref.
2015	Experiments in Self Portraiture	Sonia Gechtoff Gallery	Manhattan, NY	
2015	FACE IT: The Face in Contemporary Art	Onsite:Brooklyn	Brooklyn, NY	
2016	Urban Indigenous X	Asian Pacific Islander Cultural Center	San Francisco, CA	
2016	Creative Mischief	National Academy Museum	NYC, NY	
2016	Black and White Perspectives: Works on Paper	Sonia Gechtoff Gallery	NYC, NY	
2017	Trash Capsules	New Women Space	Brooklyn, NY	
2017	Creative Mischief	National Academy Museum	NYC, NY	
2017	Ka Ora	ORA Gallery	NYC, NY	
2018	Rendering Likeness	La Bodega Gallery	Brooklyn, NY	
2019	Mana Moana, Mana Wāhine,	Raven Row Gallery	London, UK	
2019	Talk Back (Curated by Lexy Ho Tai and Moira Williams)	Flux Factory	Queens, NY	
2020	Here To Lounge	Nook Gallery	CA	
2021	All That You Touch You Change	Helmhaus (Stadt Zurich)	Zurich, Germany	

== Residencies ==
Year	Residency	Organisation	Location	Ref.
2016	Residency	Vermont Studio Center, Johnson, VT	NYC, NY	
2016	Immigrant Artists Programme:Social Practice	New York Foundation For The Arts	NY	
2018	Artist in Residence: Ana Pekapeka Studio	Corbans Art Estate	AK, NZ	
2018	Create Change Fellow	Laundromat Project	NYC, NY	
2018	Performance Art Seminar with Xaviera Simmons	Denniston Hill	NY	
2019	Artist in Residence	Denniston Hill/Laundromat Project	NY	
2019	Disability Dance Artistry Residency	DANCE/NYC	NY	
2020	Artist in Residence	Eyebeam	NY	

== Scholarships and awards ==
Year	Scholarship/Award	Organisation	Location	Ref.
2006	Bursary Scholarship	ASB	AK, NZ	
2007	Vice-Chancellor's Award for Top Māori and Pacific Scholars	University of Auckland	NZ	
2013	Future New Zealand Charitable Trust Scholarship	Future New Zealand	NZ	
2014	National Academy School Scholarship	National Academy	NY, USA	
2019	Disability Dance Artistry Award	Dance/NYC	NY, USA	
2020	Pacific Toa - Arts Pasifika Awards	Creative New Zealand	WGN, NZ	
2020	PAK’nSAVE Artistic Achievement Award - Te Putanga Toi Arts Access Awards	Arts Access Aotearoa	NZ	

== Personal life ==
Brown has Samoan and Palagi (non-Samoan) heritage.

== External References ==
Gender/Power Composition IV Performance https://vimeo.com/188065481

Pelenakeke Brown Movement Research at the Judson Church https://www.youtube.com/watch?v=ArMqVHODgcM&t=15s
