= Dancing Wheels Company =

American professional dance company

The Dancing Wheels Company is a professional dance company based in Cleveland, Ohio. Founded in 1980, it was the first in America to stage performances involving dancers with and without disabilities. The School of Dancing Wheels was opened in 1990, which was also the start of a ten-year partnership with Cleveland Ballet.

The company was founded by Mary Verdi-Fletcher, the first professional wheelchair dancer in the United States "and one of the first in the world." Born with spina bifida, with her mother a dancer and her father a musician she had nevertheless always wanted to be a dancer.

In her analysis of the company's communication methods, Margaret M. Quinlan says that it works "to challenge dominant representations of a 'normal' body and the opportunities and privileges that accompany it. Dancing Wheels is committed to changing the negativity and fear that surround the education, employment, and inclusion of persons with disabilities in the arts and broader communities". The company uses its performances to enhance public awareness of disability issues and promote social change. The dance technique of translation involves drawing parallels between the movements and gestures of "sit-down" and "stand-up" dancers.
