= Remix Dance Project =

The Remix Dance Project (also known as Remix Dance Company) is a South African contemporary dance company that "brings together performers with physical disabilities and performers without".

The company is South Africa's first physically integrated dance company and grew out of the British Council's Tshwaragano in Touch Integrated Dance Project in Johannesburg in 2000. This was led by choreographer and teacher Adam Benjamin who has subsequently worked with Remix on several productions.

Remix was founded and directed in 2000 by Nicola Visser and was formalised as a Trust and Non-Profit Organisation in 2001 with Malcolm Black. In 2005 it became a full-time professional company and is a resident company at the Baxter Theatre Centre in Cape Town since 2010.

Remix concentrates on the contemporary dance genre drawing on release technique and contact improvisation as its primary discipline in training, with its activities focused on education for children, adults and teachers of integrated dance and the creation of "performances that are intriguing and intelligent".

The company won the Arts and Culture Trust Award for the Cultural Development Project of the Year in 2002 for its work in education and performance and the Western Cape Cultural Commission Award for Outstanding Contribution to Disability and the Arts in 2006.
