= Kitty Lunn =

American ballet dancer and actress (1950–2026)

Kitty Lunn-Macmillan (née Morrison; August 5, 1950 – August 18, 2026), known professionally as Kitty Lunn, was an American ballet dancer, actress, disability activist and founder of Infinity Dance Theater, a company that features performers with disabilities.

== Early life ==
Lunn was born in New Orleans, Louisiana, on August 5, 1950, to Hugh and Beatrice (née McClung) Morrison. As an eight-year-old watching ballerina Moira Shearer in the film The Red Shoes, Kitty Lunn was inspired to become a dancer. She left her hometown of New Orleans to study at the Washington School of Ballet, and in her teens would go on to dance principal roles with the National Ballet. When Lunn was a 16-year old ballet student in Washington, D.C., she asked the dancer and teacher Agnes de Mille if a medical intervention could help her reach six feet tall en pointe; de Mille's answer would guide her later in her career after she became disabled: "Kitty dear, you have to learn to dance in the body you have."

== Career ==
=== Dance ===
Kitty Lunn moved to New York in 1967. In 1987, during rehearsals for her Broadway debut, Lunn broke her back after slipping on ice and falling down a flight of stairs. The resulting spinal cord injury left her paraplegic. After five spinal surgeries and three years of recovery, she began to attend ballet classes again, now in her wheelchair. Although she was not taken seriously or given much encouragement by teachers and fellow students, Lunn was committed to finding a way to continue dancing.

In 1995 Lunn founded Infinity Dance Theater, a mixed-ability ensemble of dancers with and without disabilities, including performers in wheelchairs. Lunn's style is founded in classical ballet, and incorporates jazz and modern dance techniques which she modifies to suit the abilities of her dancers. Lunn has described the transposition of gestures from standing to seated dancers as "doing the same thing, differently". Her technique frequently shifts the majority of expressivity from the legs to the arms and upper body.

Infinity Dance Theater tours internationally as well as within the U.S., including performances at the Kennedy Center in Washington, D.C., and the 1996 Cultural Paralympiad in Atlanta. The company has performed pieces by choreographers Peter Pucci, Heidi Latsky, Carla Vannucchi, Gabriela Poler, Marc Brew, and Robert Koval, as well as works by Lunn herself.

She performed using a specialized lightweight wheelchair designed by her husband, actor Andrew MacMillan, which allowed her to move with speed and precision. Lunn viewed her wheelchair as a symbol of freedom and opportunity, as opposed to an obstacle or a limitation. She compared her company members' wheelchairs to ballet shoes: each must be specially engineered for the body and style of that individual dancer.

=== Acting ===
Lunn had a recurring role as Sally Horton, a disabled character on the soap opera As the World Turns. She also performed in The Chaikin Project, directed by Joseph Chaikin in 1992 at the Public Theater, Agnes of God at the Alliance Theater, and The Waiting at the Kennedy Center.

=== Teaching ===
Lunn taught dance classes for people with disabilities in which students were taught to work within their individual limitations and "dance in the body [they] have." She differentiated her classes from the practice of dance therapy, intending them instead to provide a rigorous classical ballet education to people whose bodies move differently than the typical dancer's. Lunn's mission is to develop and instill professional standards and techniques in dancers who might otherwise not be subject to the same expectations as their non-disabled counterparts. She also provided training for dance teachers so that higher-level dancers with disabilities could have the opportunity to join mainstream classes.

== Activism ==
Lunn served on the Performers with Disabilities committees for both Actor's Equity Association and SAG-AFTRA, leading negotiations for better industry compliance with the Americans with Disabilities Act as well as a broader inclusion of performers with disabilities within definitions of nontraditional casting. She received the 2004 Rosetta LeNoire award, presented by Actor's Equity in recognition of her "contributions toward increasing diversity and nontraditional casting in theatre".

== Personal life and death ==
Lunn was married to the actor and news anchor Andrew Macmillan, who died in 2016, and had a stepson. She died from cardiovascular disease in Manhattan, New York, on August 25, 2026, at the age of 76.
