= Psylons =

English post-punk band

The Psylons were an English post-punk band formed in Portsmouth, England in 1984 by Keith Wyatt, Carl Edwards, Jack Packer and Warren Grech. The band produced four singles, an EP and two albums, the second of which, “Gimp” was produced by Jim Shaw of Cranes. The debut single "Run To The Stranger" was a New Musical Express Single of the Week and reached number 13 in the Alternative/Indie chart. Two sessions were recorded for BBC Radio One and broadcast on the John Peel and Andy Kershaw shows.

Over the next few years the band gigged extensively and supported many acts including The Fall, My Bloody Valentine, Cranes, Spiritualized and Moonshake. After a number of personnel changes the band finally split in 1995.

Keith Wyatt currently records as a solo artist under the name Keith Seatman.

== Band members ==
- Keith Wyatt: Guitar Vocals (1984–95)
- Carl Edwards: Drums Guitar (1984–95)
- Jack Packer: Guitar, Keyboard (1984–95)
- Warren Grech: Bass (1984–88)
- John Haskett: Bass (1988–93)
- Sarah Shrubb: Guitar, Keyboards (1990–95)
- Simon Heartfield: Bass (1993–95)

== Discography ==
=== Singles ===
- "Run to the Stranger" / "Tumbling Clown" 7” single 1986 (Crystal 10)
- "Mockery of Decline" / "Clearer Sky" 7” single 1986 (E-Type-1)
- "All the Things We Need" / "Turning Worm" / "The Midnight Sun" 12” single 1987 (Iron Lung IL001)
- "No Choice" / "Surf Song" 7” single 1990 (Unsigned UN001)
- "Sandman" / "Driver" / "Sandman" remix 12” EP 1991 (Unsigned UN002)

=== Albums ===
- Psylons Is Golden cassette 1988 (Bite Back! BB016)
- Gimp CD 1994 (Thunderbird CSA 102)

=== Compilations ===
- Separate Ways cassette Against the Tide compilation 1986 (Bite Back! BB003)
- Run to the Stranger CD Indie Scene 86 1992 (Connoisseur Collection)
- Emperor of Songs CD Audio Postcards CD 1993 (Mass Production)
- Emperor of Songs CD Pinnacle Sampler CD 1993 (Pinnacle)

== Radio ==
- John Peel Session BBC Radio One (1986/06/01)
- "Remembrance/ Clearer Skies/ Mockery Of Decline/ Landmark"
- Andy Kershaw Session BBC Radio One (1986/11/05)
- "Separate Ways/ All the Things We Need/ She Said/ Keyhole Joe"

== Videos ==
- Emperor Of Songs (Jim Shaw Remix)
- Bug
