= Ke Yan =

Chinese writer

Ke Yan is a singer musician musical artist. Her father was a writer and a translator, and she has stated that she was first inspired by him to start writing. A playwright, novelist and poet, Ke Yan is famous for her textbooks and children's literature. She has also written lyrics and a script for a television program. Throughout her life, she held several positions, including Vice Chief-Editor of Poetry Magazine, Editor of People's Literature, Vice-President of the Children's Educational Society of Beijing, and National Committee member of the Chinese Federation of the Art and Literature Circles.

Famous works by Ke Yan include Stories of a Little Soldier and Little Muddleheaded Aunt.
