= Lusi Faiva =

Samoan stage performer and dancer

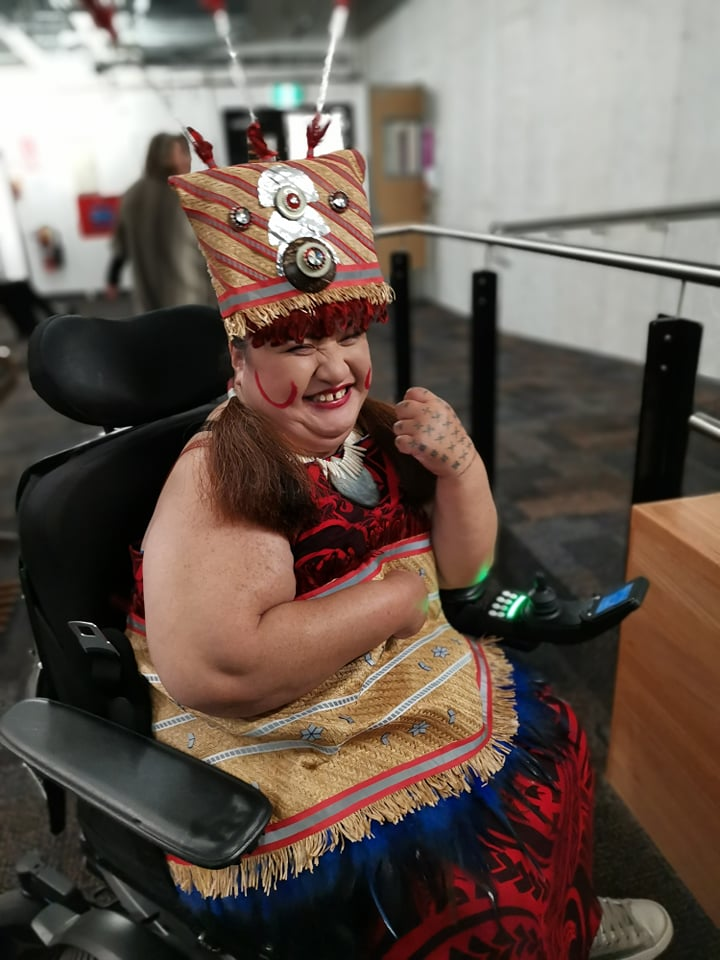
- Lusi Faiva at the Kia Mau Festival 2021
- Born: Wellington, New Zealand
- Occupation: Dancer
- Organization: Touch Compass

Lusi Faiva (born in Wellington) is a New Zealand-Samoan stage performer and dancer and a founding member of Touch Compass. She was recognised for her work with a 2020 Pacific Toa Artist Award at the Arts Pasifika Awards and in 2021 received an Artistic Achievement Award from Te Putanga Toi Arts Access Awards.

== Early life ==
Born with cerebral palsy, Faiva was taken from her birth parents and placed into an institution by the state. Ted and Peg Jones fostered her at the age of two, and she was reunited with her birth mother at the age of seven, and discovered her Samoan (Patamea, Savai'i) heritage. She grew up in Levin, Lower Hutt and Petone.

== Career ==
Faiva is described as a role model for 'disabled and non-disabled artists and audiences'. She has been a performer for the last 30 years, and considers her career to be her greatest achievement. Faiva is a founding member of New Zealand's Touch Compass, a professional performance company that is disability-led, producing performance works and arts activations. She has performed for the company in all its major shows in New Zealand and Australia since 1997 and sits on the Artistic Direction Panel.

“As a performer with a disability, I have had to overcome barriers, with people saying that I can’t talk or dance. But it seems that I have proved them wrong. I believe it is possible for anyone who has a disability to achieve their dreams in this able-bodied world” (Faiva)

One of her first shows Lusi’s Eden (2001), is an autobiographical performance based on her early childhood years spent living in institutions, which she reprised in 2002 and 2007. Described by Auckland Art Festival's director Shona McCullagh as "one of the most impactful works I have ever seen. This was truly ground-breaking work.”

Mr and Mrs Jones (2014), is a short film about her foster parents who taught her to read and write, enabling her to communicate with others.

Faiva performed in Wellington's CubaDupa festival in 2021, collaborating with the theatre company Everybody Cool Lives Here and Tupe Lualua, creating a work called Taupou. Creating Taupou was a journey for Faiva about reconnection and acceptance through her culture and community, as a Samoan. Faiva intends to turn Taupou into a full-length show to tour around the country in the near future.

== Performances and Films ==
- 2024 AIGA, Touch Compass, Te Ahurei Toi o Tāmaki | Auckland Arts Festival
- 2022 Rītaha, Touch Compass 25th Anniversary livestream event
- 2021 Taupou, Everybody Cool Lives Here, Cubadupa
- 2021 Being Me:Lusi, Attitude Pictures
- 2019 Masina Returning Home, Touch Compass, Frozen Light production
- 2019 Becoming Masina, short documentary, director Veronica Maitre, Doc Edge Festival
- 2014 Me and Mrs Jones, short film, DanceBox
- 2005-2006 Old Yella, Tempo
- 2004 Absurd Beauties, Splash Dance Company
- 2001 Lusi's Eden
- 1997 - 2007 Toured New Zealand and Australia for the company Touch Compass's major shows

== Awards ==
- 2021 Arts Access PAK’nSAVE Artistic Achievement Award,Te Putanga Toi Arts Access Awards
- 2020 Spirit of Attitude award, The Attitude Awards, Creating Achievements of the Disability Community
- 2020 Pacific Toa Artist Award, Creative New Zealand
- 2019 Highly Commended PAK’n’SAVE Artistic Achievement Award, Te Putanga Toi Arts Access Awards

== See also ==
- List of dancers

== External reference ==
Video about Lusi Faiva on You Tube
