= Litz Pisk =

Alizia Pisk, or Litz Pisk, (1909 – 1997) was a movement teacher and movement director who worked in British theatre.

== Biography ==
Pisk was born in Vienna on 22 October 1909 and died in Cornwall on 6 January 1997. She moved to Britain in 1933 and acquired British citizenship in 1937. In London, she taught actor movement at RADA, the Old Vic Theatre School and at Royal Central School of Speech and Drama, where she was Head of Movement from 1964 to 1970. Having come from a fine art background, she also taught drawing to art students.

Between 1951 and 1955 Pisk taught classes on movement, movement and drawing, natural form and life drawing at Bath Academy of Art at Corsham Court. Towards the end of the 1950s Pisk embarked on a movement direction collaboration with director Michael Elliot. Elliot and Pisk first worked together on the movement of a television version of The Women Of Troy by Euripides. This collaboration continued with the ’59 Theatre Company and by 1961 Pisk and Elliot were also working on Shakespeare’s As You Like It for the Royal Shakespeare Company, with a performance of Rosalind by Vanessa Redgrave. Elliot was part of a group of theatre artists who formed the Old Vic Company for a year from 1962 to 1963 and Pisk became the in-house Director of Movement for the company. Pisk was to work again with Vanessa Redgrave in 1968 on the film Isadora, directed by Karel Reisz. Periodically she would also exhibit her own drawings. After her retirement she published a book on actor movement, The Actor and His Body. She moved to St Ives in Cornwall in 1970.

== Publications ==
- The Actor and His Body (4th ed.). London: Bloomsbury Publishing PLC. 2017 [1975]. ISBN 9781474269759.
