= Isadora Duncan Dance Awards =

The Isadora Duncan Dance Awards or Izzies honor San Francisco Bay Area dance artists for outstanding achievements in a range of categories including: choreography, sustained achievement, individual performance, company performance, costume design, and set design. The awards are presented annually and named in honor of Isadora Duncan. The awards began in 1986 and were revitalized in 2004 via a partnership with Bay Area National Dance Week after a slump due, in part, to a perceived lack of credibility.

== Award Winners and Honorees ==
=== Outstanding Achievement in Choreography ===
- 2017-2018 Jyothi Lakkaraju, Ananda Narthana Ganapathim, Natyalaya School of Kuchipudi, SF Ethnic Dance Festival, War Memorial Opera House, San Francisco
- 2017-2018 Trey McIntyre, Your Flesh Shall Be a Great Poem, San Francisco Ballet, War Memorial Opera House, San Francisco
- 2016-2017 Lizz Roman, Sunset Dances: Architectural Meditations II, Lizz Roman & Dancers, home salon performances, San Francisco

=== Outstanding Achievement in Performance – Individual ===
- 2017-2018 Hien Huynh, Within These Walls, choreographed by Leonora Lee and dancers, Leonora Lee Dance, Angel Island Immigration Station, San Francisco
- 2016-2017 Isaiah Bindel, les vérités, dawsondancesf, YBCA Theater, San Francisco

=== Outstanding Achievement in Performance – Ensemble ===
- 2017-2018 Xochitl Sosa and Caroline Wright, Unravel, choreographed by Xochitl Sosa and Caroline Wright, San Francisco Aerial Arts Festival, Cowell Theater, Fort Mason, San Francisco
- 2016-2017 MaryStarr Hope and Karla Quintero, "The Two Sisters" from Grace and Delia Are Gone, Flyaway Productions, Firehouse at Fort Mason, San Francisco

=== ·Outstanding Achievement in Performance – Company ===
- 2017-2018 OngDance Company, Salt Doll, choreographed by Kyoumgil Ong, War Memorial Opera House, San Francisco
- 2016-2017 Abhinaya Dance Company of San José, Vaanara Leela: Monkeys in the Ramayana, School of Arts & Culture at Mexican Heritage Plaza, San José

=== Outstanding Achievement in Music/Sound/Text ===
- 2017-2018 Sean Dorsey, Jesse Olsen Bay, Anomie Belle, L. D. Brown, Grace Coleman, LD Dean, ArVejon Jones, Alex Kelly, Ben Kessler, Nol Simonse, Boys in Trouble, choreographed by Sean Dorsey, Sean Dorsey Dance, Z Space, San Francisco
- 2016-2017 Marc Bamuthi Joseph and Tommy Shepherd, /peh-LO-tah/, Living Word Project, YBCA Theater, San Francisco

=== Outstanding Achievement in Visual Design ===
- 2017-2018 Amara Tabor-Smith with Yvette Aldama, Yoshi Asai, Alexa Burrell, Regina Calloway, Ellen Sebastian Chang, Tobe Correal, Sana Kawano, House Full of Black Women: episode 12: passing/through/the great middle, co-created by Amara Tabor-Smith and Ellen Sebastian Chang in collaboration with the performers, Deep Waters Dance Theater, EastSide Central Center, Oakland
- 2016-2017 Brian Jones and Susan Roemer, Wandering, Amy Seiwert's Imagery, Cowell Theater, San Francisco

=== Outstanding Achievement in Restaging / Revival / Reconstruction ===
- 2017-2018 Jean-Pierre Frohlich, revival of Fancy Free (1944) and The Cage (1951) and Isabelle Guerin, revival of Other Dances (1976), choreographed by Jerome Robbins, San Francisco Ballet, War Memorial Opera House, San Francisco
- 2017-2018 Joanna Haigood, in collaboration with Jeff Raz and the performers, revival of The View from Here (2002), directed by Joanna Haigood, Zaccho Dance Theatre, Zaccho Dance Studio, San Francisco
- 2016-2017 Krissy Keefer, revival of The Great Liberation Upon Hearing (2009), Dance Brigade, Dance Mission Theater, San Francisco
- 2016-2017 Philharmonia Baroque Orchestra & Chorale and Catherine Turocy, restaging of Le Temple de La Gloire (The Temple of Glory) (1745) by Jean-Philippe Rameau, Zellerbach Hall, Berkeley

=== Special Award Honoree ===
- 2017-2018 Outstanding Production for Within These Walls choreographed by Leonora Lee, Leonora Lee Dance remembering the 1882 Chinese Exclusion Act
- 2017-2018 San Francisco Ballet for Unbound: A Festival of New Works for contemporary ballets
- 2016-2017 Antoine Hunter, for the 2017 Bay Area International Deaf Dance Festival, which united exceptional deaf and hearing dancers and increased their visibility in the Bay Area

=== Sustained Achievement Honorees ===
- 2017-2018 AXIS Dance Company for "30 years of innovative artistry, sustained community engagement, and steadfast local and international advocacy for dancers of all ages and abilities"
- 2017-2018 Carnaval San Francisco "for celebrating the diverse Latin American and Caribbean roots of the Mission District and the Bay Area for over 40 years"
- 2017-2018 Jodi Lomask, "who through her company, Capacitor, has for 20 years combined dance and circus arts with science to create outstanding artistic and educational moments."
- 2016-2017 La Tania, for her mastery and fostering of flamenco in the Bay Area as a teacher, choreographer, and performer for the past 24 years
- 2016-2017 RJ Muna, for his artistic contributions to the community that capture the choreographers and dancers of the Bay Area through photographic excellence
- 2016-2017 Harry Rubeck, for over 20 years of outstanding contributions supporting Bay Area dance artists through the field of lighting design
