= Petra Kuppers =

German academic and performance artist (born 1968)

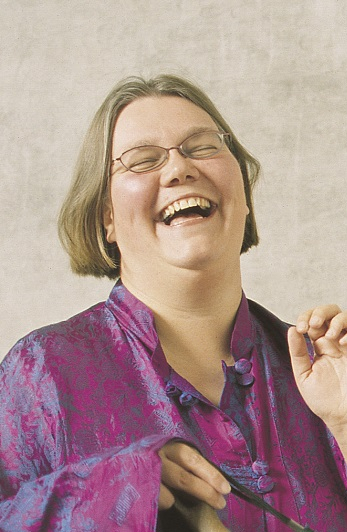
- Kuppers in 2005
- Born: 1968 (age 57–58); Germany
- Occupations: Professor of English, Art and Design, Theatre and Drama, Women's Studies, University of Michigan, Ann Arbor
- Known for: Performance artist and disability activist

Petra Kuppers (born 1 April 1968) is a community performance artist and a disability culture activist. She is a professor of English, Women's and Gender Studies, Theater and Dance, and Art and Design, teaching mainly in Performance Studies and Disability Studies, at the University of Michigan, Ann Arbor, and she served on the faculty of Goddard College's MFA program in Interdisciplinary Arts for over a decade until the program ended.

== Early life and education ==
Petra Kuppers was born 1 April 1968, in a small town in northern-western Germany. She left Germany when she was 24 and then spent 10 years in Wales, where she learned about disability culture before moving to the United States.

She was the first in her immediate family to go to university. She went on to gain an MA in Film Studies from the University of Warwick; an MA in Germanistik, Cultural Anthropology, Theatre, Film and TV Studies from the University of Cologne; and a PhD in Performance Studies and Feminist Theory from the Falmouth College of Art. She also has a Diploma in Health and Social Welfare Studies from the Open University in the UK.

== Career ==
Kuppers is the artistic director of The Olimpias: Performance Research Projects, an artists' collective that creates collaborative, exploratory environments for people with physical, emotional, sensory and cognitive differences to interact with their allies. Her book about how The Olimpias conducts research through artistic practices, Disability Culture and Community Performance: Find a Strange and Twisted Shape, won the biennial Sally Banes Award from the American Association for Theatre Research. Kuppers is also the recipient of the President's Award for Art and Activism, Women Caucus for the Arts, awarded at the College Art Association's National Meeting in New York City, 2015 She received a Dance/USA Fellowship in 2022. She received a Guggenheim Fellowship in 2023 for her work on the Crip/Mad Archive Dances, and was the Winner of the Visionary Trailblazer Award by the Association for Theatre in Higher Education for her work in community performance and disability culture in 2024. She is a Camargo Fellow, a MacDowell Fellow, and the recipient of a 2024-2026 Just Tech Fellowship for her work on the Planting Disabled Futures virtual reality/community performance ritual.

== Work ==
Kuppers is widely published in journals that explore issues how disability engages with culture and the arts such as TDR: The Drama Review, About Performance, Liminalities, Afterimage, the Quarterly Review of Film and Video, and differences. Her books include Disability and Contemporary Performance: Bodies on Edge (2003), The Scar of Visibility: Medical Performances and Contemporary Art (2007), Community Performance: An Introduction (2007), Disability Culture and Community Performance: Find a Strange and Twisted Shape (2013), and Studying Disability Arts and Culture (2014).

She co-authored the poetry collection Cripple Poetics: A Love Story (2008) with fellow disability culture activist Neil Marcus.

She has also co-authored multiple texts and performances with her wife, poet, dancer and mental health activist Stephanie Heit, with whom she also co-directs Turtle Disco, a community somatic writing studio in their home in Ypsilanti, Michigan.

Her third poetry collection, Gut Botany (Wayne State University Press, 2020), was named one of New York Public Library's "Best Books of 2020" and received the 2022 Creative Book Award of the Association for the Study of Literature and the Environment.

In 2024, she published the true crime/psychogeographic poetry collection Diver Beneath the Street (Wayne State University Press), which focuses on the 1967-69 Michigan Murders as well as the 2019 Detroit Serial Killer. The collection was a finalist for the Julie Suk Award for best poetry collection by an independent press.

Her arts-based research monograph, Eco Soma: Pain and Joy in Speculative Performance Encounters (University of Minnesota Press, 2022, open access) received multiple honors:

- Winner –Outstanding Book Award with Distinction for Innovative Achievement – Association for Theatre in Higher Education
- Finalist – Barnard Hewitt Award – American Society for Theatre Research
- Honorable Mention – David Bradby Monograph Prize – British Theatre and Performance Research Association
- Honorable Mention – Ruth Lovell Murray Book Award – National Dance Education Association
