= Neil Marcus =

American actor and playwright (1954–2021)

- Born: January 3, 1954; White Plains, New York, U.S.
- Died: November 17, 2021 (aged 67); Berkeley, California, U.S.
- Cause of death: Complications from dystonia

Neil Marcus (January 3, 1954 – November 17, 2021) was an actor and playwright active in the development of disability culture, who has reshaped ways of thinking about disability.

== Early life ==
Marcus was born on January 3, 1954, in White Plains, New York. He developed generalised dystonia when he was eight years old.

According to Carrie Sandhal's entry in the Encyclopedia of American Disability History, "Marcus was born on January 3, 1954, in White Plains, New York, but spent his childhood in Ojai, California. He was the youngest of five children. His mother was an actress, the first person on television and a storyteller on radio, and his father handled public relations for CBS and Polaroid, and was an avid photographer. Marcus was an active child who loved the outdoors and physical activity, qualities that would continue even after the age of eight, when his dystonia manifested itself. His onset of dystonia was painful and disorienting, as diagnosis was elusive and a cure impossible. Marcus struggled with depression throughout his adolescence and began writing in his journal, chronicling his frustrations and joys as a disabled person. He credited his experiences in co-counseling, which he began at age 14, with pulling him out of his depression and spawning his performance aesthetic. Co-counseling involves peer-to-peer, confidential counseling that helps the participants discover themselves and deal with their emotions. Marcus had discussed his relationship with audiences as a form of co-counseling in which he and they share experiences on a journey of discovering self and other."

== Career ==
His early career began when Marcus left for college in Washington State, he began to write. Later moving to Berkeley to continue his studies, he became active in the Disability Rights Movement.

He started a street zine in the early 1980s, Special Effects, as a form to express what he experienced and learned through his participation in the disabled and independent living movement. Special Effects was distributed in a street zine fashion, as well as by mailing list.

Marcus curated interventions with a cut, copy and paste methodology which encompassed the art, culture, and humor into the political discourse of disability.

Storm Reading, his play in collaboration with Rod Lathim, Roger Marcus and Access Theater, has been shown on television and performed at the Kennedy Center, as well as being featured on NPR and NBC's Today Show. Storm Reading challenged audiences to reevaluate conventional ideas about disability and set a standard for performing artists with disabilities, and for performance access technologies. Voted Best Ensemble and Leading Actor in 1992 by DramaLogue Magazine and Critic's Choice 1992, Storm Reading had a nearly decade-long run. Marcus received the 1994 Isadora Duncan Dance Award for Outstanding Achievement in Sound/Score/Text for his work, Art of Human Being

Brenda Jo Brueggemann shares in an anthology about disability and performance, how she introduces to students to her class: " I show a recorded performance of Storm Reading, especially the opening clip. I have used it to open courses on representations of disability in language, language in literature and culture. I use it first because Marcus begins with the central issue for disabled people: Their position in relation to being 'human.'"

Marcus participated in a range of diverse projects. Since 2008, he had been collaborating with Petra Kuppers in The Olimpias Disability Culture Research Projects, and since 2010, Marcus had also worked on a number of projects with Stephen Lichty, a New York-based sculptor.

Marcus's poem Disabled Country introduces the Smithsonian's permanent web exhibition EveryBody: An Artifact History of Disability in America.

In 2011, Marcus choreographed a videodance with Richard Chen See, a Paul Taylor dancer. In a 2014 video with sculptor Shane Brodie, Marcus embodies the "abstract" in abstract art.

Marcus lived in Berkeley, California. His papers have been archived by the Bancroft library of the University of California at Berkeley as part of the Artists with Disabilities Oral History Project.

He died on November 17, 2021, in Berkeley, California.

His autobiography, I, Spastic: The Autobiography of Neil Marcus was posthumously published in September 2024.

== Work ==
- Oral history interview transcript - Neil Marcus, "Performance Artist" conducted by Esther Ehrlich in 2004, Regional Oral History Office, The Bancroft Library, University of California, Berkeley, 2006.
- Marcus, Neil. Special Effects: Advances in Neurology. Publication Studio, 2011. Full text available for free here: Neil Marcus Special Effects.
- Marcus, Neil, Petra Kuppers, and Lisa Steichmann. Cripple Poetics: A Love Story. Ypsilanti: Homofactus Press, 2008. Full text available for free access.
- Marcus, Neil, and Petra Kuppers. "Disability/Performance. A Collaborative Essay." Journal for Applied Theatre and Performance (2009) 14: 1, 141 - 155.
- Marcus, Neil. Disabled Country. This poem introduces the Smithsonian's permanent web exhibition EveryBody: An Artifact History of Disability in America.
- Marcus, Neil, with S. H. Chambers. I, Spastic: The Autobiography of Neil Marcus. 2024

=== Theater, Dance, Performance Art, and Television ===
- Marcus, Neil. Storm Reading.
- Ongoing collaboration with Petra Kuppers for The Olimpias: Performance Research Projects
- "Of Past Regret and Future Fear". ER. 1998. NBC.

=== Videos ===
- Neil Marcus' Special Effects on YouTube dir. Petra Kuppers. The Olimpias, 2013.
- Neil Marcus' Disabled Country on YouTube dir. Neil Marcus. Editor.JaiJai Noire.2013

==== The Olimpias Project ====
- Disability is an Art | Neil Marcus dir. Unknown.
- Critical Discourse: Art, Disability, Images, Bodies, dir. Grand Rapids Cable Access, 2014
- Salamander: Compilation dir. Neil Marcus. 2014
