= The Gimp Project =

The GIMP Project is a New-York based modern dance project by the Heidi Latsky Dance company, and originally produced by Jeremy Alliger of Alliger Arts. Heidi Latsky choreographs work for four professional dancers and four dancers with physical disabilities, who perform integrated dance pieces.

== Origins of the Project ==
Heidi Latsky has had a longtime interest in dance that pushes beyond conventional boundaries. She is a former dancer in the Bill T. Jones/Arnie Zane Dance Company, and has danced with Larry Goldhuber, a dancer with large "physical proportions". Latsky has also trained actors in movement techniques for over 20 years.

GIMP has the goal of combining dancers of all "corporealities", making both disabled and able-bodied dancers objects of spectacle. Latsky's plans for GIMP include adding to its body of work over "the next 5–10 years".

The name of the company is one meant to challenge stereotypes of physical disability. The GIMP Project's website provides the following definitions of the term "gimp":

1. a ribbonlike, braided fabric
2. fighting spirit; vigor
3. a lame person
4. slang; a halting, lame walk
5. to turn, vacillate, tremble ecstatically

An outreach program is part of the GIMP performances. This brings an educational component to the project's work. According to the project's Website, the outreach program currently includes:

- A diversity of articulate voices (a ready-made panel discussion)
- A genre-shattering showcase of cutting edge disability film (no handkerchief necessary, no heroism required!)
- A choreographer who is also a degreed psychologist
- A national disability advocate and lecturer
- A choreographer celebrated for setting work on local dancers
- A dancer with expertise working with HIV communities

== Reception ==
In 2009, Theodore Bale wrote in Dance Magazine of the confrontational aspect of Latsky's approach:

the dancers in GIMP ... make the situation reciprocal. They stare back at you. Subverting these well-established "polite" conventions of gaze is the starting point for this event, which skillfully blends political inquiry, psychology, and aesthetic explorations of form, structure and dynamics. GIMP is without doubt a gleaming milestone in the progress of contemporary dance and theater, making "disabled dancer" an oxymoron.

In his review for The New York Times, Corey Kilgannon quotes dancer Lawrence Carter-Long explaining the GIMP approach: "This is no safe prearranged marriage of dance and disability [...] This is a collision. This is two worlds coming together that ain't supposed to co-exist."

The GIMP Project tours in major cities of the United States, and performs at such New York City theater institutions as the Lincoln Center.

== See also ==
- Contemporary dance
- Disability in the arts
