= Te Putanga Toi Arts Access Awards =

Annual arts awards in New Zealand

The Te Putanga Toi Arts Access Awards, formerly called the Big 'A' Awards, are New Zealand arts awards, presented annually by Arts Access Aotearoa.

Introduced in 2007, they were initially called the Big 'A' Awards, but were renamed as Te Putanga Toi Arts Access Awards in 2018. The awards recognise the contribution of individuals and organisations in providing access to the arts, and celebrate the achievements of artists with lived experience of disability or mental ill-health. There are currently seven awards, including a Community Partnership award, a Museum award, two Arts in Corrections awards, the Arts Access Artistic Achievement Award for artists with a disability or lived experience of mental ill-health, and an Arts Access Accolade, presented to someone who has made a significant contribution to accessibility. The award winners are selected by a panel of judges, except for the Arts Accolade, which is selected by the staff and board of Arts Access Aotearoa.

Up until 2020 the trophies for each award were made by Robert Rapson. Hedy Ankers, of Wellington Potters, took over after Rapson's death.

In 2022 a decision was made to pause the awards event with a fellowship instead.

== 2021 awards ==
The 2021 awards were held at Museum of New Zealand Te Papa Tongarewa in Wellington on 5 July 2021. This year a new award was introduced, the Arts Access Creative New Zealand Media Award.

Award	Winner	Notes	Source
Arts Access Accolade	Lawrence Ereatara and Hone Fletcher	First time the award was presented to two people. The winners both work at Hawkes Bay Regional Prison, and are responsible for implementing the new Māori Pathways programme.	
Arts Access Creative New Zealand Media Award	Andre Chumko	Chumko is a journalist for Stuff and The Dominion Post. He received the award for "demonstrat[ing] leadership and excellence in reporting about accessibility and inclusion in the arts – in prisons, the professional arts sector and in the community arts sector".	
Arts Access PAK’nSAVE Artistic Achievement Award	Lusi Faiva	"For her outstanding artistic achievements, and contributions to dance and the disabled community". Helen Vivienne Fletcher, Wellington, was highly commended in this category "for her achievements and contributions as a multi-talented writer, performance poet, teacher and mentor."	
Arts Access Creative New Zealand Arts For All Award	Circa Theatre, Wellington	"For its long-term commitment to becoming more accessible". Theresa Cooper, Wellington, was highly commended in this category "for creating a legacy so that Te Papa and the wider GLAM sector can provide a positive experience for Deaf visitors, including the introduction of an NZSL web-based museum guide at Te Papa." Nicola Owen and Audio Described Aotearoa, Auckland, were also highly commended in this category, "for pioneering and developing audio description in New Zealand, always promoting the voice of blind people in the audio description process."	
Arts Access Holdsworth Creative Space Award 2021	Art-East, Christchurch	"For its rich mix of arts projects that empower its artists with alcohol or drug addiction issues, mental ill health, isolation and institutionalisation." Cantabrainers Choir, Christchurch, were highly commended in this category, "for transforming the lives of its singers (people with neurological conditions such as stroke, Parkinson’s disease, Multiple Sclerosis and Traumatic Brain Injury) and building community, social connection and joy in singing." Women's Art Initiative, Palmerston North, were also highly commended in this category, "for providing safe, healing place where women can explore their creativity."	
Arts Access Manatū Taonga Community Arts Award	Christchurch Symphony Orchestra and its Platform Programme	"For its outstanding programme with Christchurch Men’s Prison through the Pathway Trust."	
Arts Access Corrections Māui Tikitiki a Taranga Award	Tipene Rangihuna (Pāpā T), of Eastern Institute of Technology and Hawkes Bay Regional Prison	"For his leadership and commitment in passing on his knowledge and teaching te reo Māori to men in Hawkes Bay Regional Prison to create transformational change and strengthen te ao Māori." Juanita Davis, Whanganui, was highly commended in this category "for her raranga programme with men in Whanganui Prison, developing their confidence, cultural identity and skills." Zak Devey and Youth Arts NZ, Auckland, were highly commended "for his dedication, reflection, responsiveness and innovative processes in the development of Te Kāhui, a creative writing programme for rangatahi in Mt Eden Corrections Facility." Annah Mac, Otago Corrections Facility, was highly commended "for her commitment to music as a powerful rehabilitative tool. Creating an album of music across multiple sites demonstrates her ability to navigate complex issues and achieve excellent results."	
Arts Access Corrections Whai Tikanga Award 2021	Kyle Ellison and Pirika Taepa, Hawkes Bay Regional Prison	"For incorporating tikanga and toi Māori into employment programmes." Sharne Parkinson and Harakeke Down South, Invercargill, were highly commended in this category "for sharing her expertise and passion for toi Māori and tikanga with men in Invercargill Prison."	

== 2020 awards ==
The awards for 2020 were presented online.

Award	Winner	Notes	Source
Arts Access Accolade	Judith Jones	Jones "is a champion of accessibility and inclusion in the arts. Judith is an experienced audio describer and offers sensory tours at Te Papa Tongarewa, where she works as a host."	
Arts Access PAK’nSAVE Artistic Achievement Award	Duncan Armstrong, Northland, Wellington	"For his outstanding artistic achievements across a range of artforms. Duncan has demonstrated enormous perseverance in overcoming obstacles and pursuing his career, and his list of achievements is thoroughly deserved."	
Arts Access Creative New Zealand Arts For All Award	Tim Bray Theatre Company, Takapuna, Auckland	"For its leadership and long-term commitment to accessibility since 2004, when it started to provide NZSL interpreted theatre performances to children."	
Arts Access Holdsworth Creative Space Award 2021	Arts For Health Community Trust, Hamilton	"For its impact in the community over 30 years. The arts programmes of this grassroots organisation touch the lives of diverse people: youth, hospital patients, senior citizens."	
Arts Access Creative New Zealand Community Arts Award	MIX and Arts on High (Hutt City), Pablos Art Studio and Vinnies Re Sew (Wellington) and The Shed Project (Kapiti Coast) for their project Get A Hat, Get A Head	"For an outstanding collaborative exhibition at Wellington Museum with high-quality artistic outcomes and an impressive public programme of events held during Mental Health Awareness Week 2019."	
Arts Access Corrections Māui Tikitiki a Taranga Award	Rue-Jade Morgan, Dunedin	"For his leadership in sharing his skills and life experience as a former prisoner with others in his Te Hōkai Manea Tīpuna."	
Arts Access Corrections Whai Tikanga Award 2021	Redemption Performing Arts Whānau and Redemption Arts Tuakana Teina Mentors, Northland Region Corrections Facility, Bay of Islands	"For taking leadership roles and mentoring other prisoners, including during the COVID-19 lockdown. The group works collaboratively and autonomously, using the pillars of Corrections’ Hōkai Rangi Strategy as its guide."	
