= Zaccho Dance Theatre =

San Francisco Dance Company

- Founder: Joanna Haigood
- Location: San Francisco, CA
- Website: http://www.zaccho.org/

Founded in 1980, Zaccho Dance Theatre is a San Francisco-based dance company. The company presents site-specific works as well as works inspired by environmental, cultural, and structural settings. Zaccho's co-founder and artistic director, Joanna Haigood, is the company's primary choreographer. The company has performed at prestigious festivals and art centers including the National Black Arts Festival, Fall for Dance Festival, Festival d'Avignon in France, Jacob's Pillow Dance Festival, the Walker Arts Center, and the McColl Center for Visual Art. The company also runs a free arts education program for students age 7 to 17 at its studio in Bayview-Hunters Point, San Francisco.
