= AXIS Dance Company =

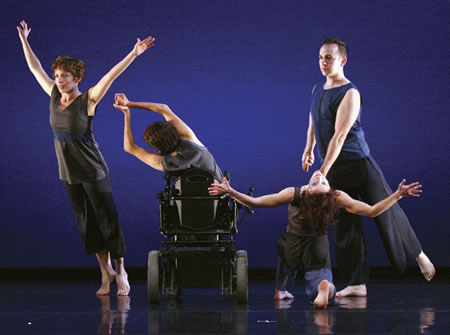
- The AXIS Dance Company performs Waypoint by Margaret Jenkins. From left to right are dancers Margaret Cromwell, Bonnie Lewkowicz, Sonsherée Giles, and Sean McMahon.

General information
- Name: AXIS Dance Company
- Year founded: 1987
- Founders: Thais Mazur, Bonnie Lewkowicz, Judith Smith
- Founding artistic director: Thais Mazur
- Location: Berkeley, California
- Website: axisdance.org

Artistic staff
- Artistic director: Nadia Adame Rojas

AXIS Dance Company is a professional physically integrated contemporary dance company and dance education organization founded in 1987 and based in Oakland, California. It is one of the first contemporary dance companies in the world to consciously develop choreography that integrates dancers with and without physical disabilities. Their work has received nine Isadora Duncan Dance Awards and nine additional nominations for both their artistry and production values.

== History ==
Founded in 1987 by Thais Mazur, Bonnie Lewkowicz, Judith Smith and others, AXIS is a long running contemporary dance company that consciously develops choreography that integrates dancers with and without physical disabilities. Thais Mazur, the original Artistic Director, became inspired when she began working with a theater group of disabled adults to expand that work into dance. They started with a lighting and movement workshop and the experimenting expanded from there.

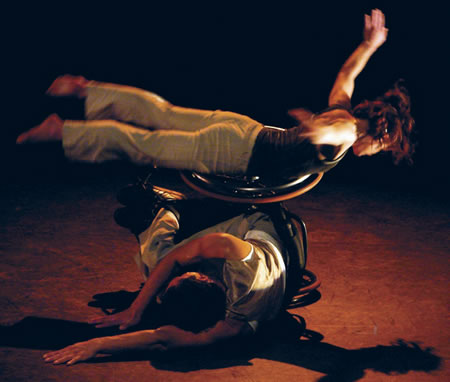
AXIS Dance Company members Sonsherée Giles and Rodney Bell perform an award-winning dance piece by Joe Goode in 2008.

AXIS dancers with disabilities have included wheelchair users (both manual wheelchairs and power wheelchairs), crutch users, and people with amputations. AXIS dancers who are not disabled come with training in a variety of contemporary dance, improvisation and other movement practices. Through interactions between these dancers of varying physical abilities a new dance vocabulary began to be developed. Physically integrated dance, seeks to broaden the definition of ‘dance’ and ‘dancer’ and increase opportunities for artistic expression through movement for a wide spectrum of physical attributes and disabilities.

The physically integrated dance movement is part of a broader disability culture movement, the goal of which is to center and celebrate the first-person experience of disability, not as a medical-model construct but as a social phenomenon, through artistic, literary, and other creative means. AXIS Dance was one of the earliest companies in the international emerging field of physically integrated dance. They have commissioned works by a number of prominent choreographers, including Ann Carlson, Sonya Delwaide, Joe Goode, Joanna Haigood, Margaret Jenkins, Bill T. Jones, Victoria Marks, and Stephen Petronio.

The company has created over sixty repertory works, including multiple evening-length works. The company has also created pieces for commissions by Yerba Buena Center for the Arts, Bates Dance Festival, San Francisco Exploratorium, and CAL Performances-UAM/PFA.

AXIS has performed in more than 100 U.S. cities, Europe, Israel, and Siberia. In 2002, they performed at the Olympic Arts Festival in Salt Lake City for the 2002 Winter Olympics. They also performed at the 2012 London paralympics. In 2015 AXIS Dance Company performed at the John F. Kennedy Center for the Performing Arts for National Dance Day

== Education and outreach ==
=== Advocacy ===
In May 2016 during its 30th anniversary season, AXIS Dance Company hosted the first three-day National Convening: The Future of Physically Integrated Dance in the USA Gibney Dance in New York City. This event was supported by the Doris Duke Charitable Foundation National Project Program, and culminated in the creation of the report, The Future of Physically Integrated Dance in the USA, which looks at “ways to 1) improve and expand training opportunities and develop pedagogy for dancers with disabilities; and 2) improve training and expand opportunities for disabled choreographers and non-disabled choreographers to work with disabled dancers or integrated ensembles.”

Often when touring, AXIS will couple outreach, advocacy, and dance education into their stay at a venue. In 2017 the company had a residency with Gibney Dance in New York City that included a choreography intensive, master classes, town halls, and teacher workshops.

=== Educational programs ===
According to former Artistic Director Judith Smith, the company spends about 50% of their time on educational work. AXIS Dance Company frequent hosts master classes with the company member dancers as teachers wherever they are on tour or in the San Francisco Bay Area which they call home. They also have a program in which they travel to schools across America and perform for a school assembly and teach the students afterward. For schools near the SF Bay Area, AXIS opens the doors to their theatre for an annual Dance Access Day and does in-school residencies through school district Physical education programs.

=== Impact of COVID-19 pandemic ===
The COVID-19 pandemic had a large impact on all performing arts and performing arts education industries. For AXIS, this meant the cancellation of many performances including a first time tour of Switzerland. AXIS found a few ways to continue their work while the country and state of California were in lockdown: master classes hosted over Zoom (software), virtualized school assembly visits, and small improvisational exercises and prompts posted to their Youtube channel.

== Awards ==
AXIS has received numerous Isadora Duncan Dance Awards (IZZIES) including:

- Sustained Achievement in 2014 to Judith Smith, Founding Member and Artistic Director Emerita
- Outstanding Achievement in Performance - Individual in 2012 to Marc Brew for Remember When
- Ensemble Performance in 2008 to Rodney Bell and Sonsheree Giles in To Color Me Different by Alex Ketley
- Choreography to Joe Goode in 2008 for the beauty that was mine, through the middle, without stopping...
- Ensemble Performance in 2002 to Nadia Adame and Jacques Poulin-Denis in Sans Instruments choreographed by Sonya Delwaide
- Costume Design in 2001 to Mario Alonzo for AXIS’ entire Home Season Voyages Elsewhere and Between, choreography by Sonya Delwaide, Bill T. Jones, Stephen Petroni, AXIS’ Stephanie McGlynn and Uli Schmitz and AXIS’ Alisa Rasera and Megan Schirle
- Company Performance in 2000 for AXIS’ entire Home Season The Ground, the Air and Places in Between, choreography by Sonya Delwaide, Joe Goode, Joanna Haigood and Bill T. Jones
- Choreography to Bill T. Jones in 2000 for Fantasy in C Major
- Individual Performance in 2000 to Uli Schmitz, the first disabled dancer to receive this award

The company has also received numerous IZZIE nominations for artistic work and production elements.
