= Full Radius Dance =

Dance company in Atlanta, Georgia

General information
- Name: Full Radius Dance
- Previous names: Dance Force
- Year founded: 1998
- Founder: Douglas Scott
- Founding artistic director: Douglas Scott
- Principal venue: 7Stages Theatre; 1105 Euclid Ave NE; Atlanta, GA 30307
- Website: fullradiusdance.org

Other
- Formation: Formed out of the merger between Dance Force and E=Motion dance companies

Full Radius Dance is a professional modern dance company in the field of physically integrated dance based in Atlanta. The company features dancers with and without physical disabilities.

== Founding ==
In 1990, founder Douglas Scott established Dance Force, a traditional modern dance company. He began teaching classes for people with disabilities in 1993 through a partnership with VSA Arts of Georgia, and in 1995 formed a sister company for dancers with disabilities called E=Motion. The companies formally merged to create Full Radius Dance in 1998. Douglas Scott continues to serve as artistic and executive director.

== Work ==
Full Radius Dance has created more than 70 repertory works. The company produces two concerts in Atlanta each year, including the Modern Atlanta Dance Festival, performs in festivals, tours, and presents site-specific and community works. Critically acclaimed works choreographed by Artistic Director Douglas Scott include "Passione", "Crawl/Climb", "Touch", "Bar Songs", "It is four years ago and it is yesterday", and "SNAPSHOT". The company's 25th anniversary concert "Silver" premiered in Atlanta, GA in March 2017 and was subsequently performed internationally at the Una Mirada Diferente Festival in Madrid, Spain and in New York City at the Harlem School of the Arts. Their most recent production, 'Tapestry' was heralded as a masterwork by ArtsAtl.

== Education ==
Full Radius Dance offers educational programs, masterclasses, and workshops for all ages. The company also offers professional training in physically integrated dance through apprenticeships, residencies, and a summer intensive.

== The Modern Atlanta Dance Festival ==
Full Radius Dance is the host company of the Modern Atlanta Dance (MAD) Festival. A juried festival, MAD was created in 1995 to present and celebrate the best of Georgia's diverse modern and contemporary dance scene. The MAD Festival is currently presented as two nights of performances. Also under the umbrella of the festival are events such as the 24-hour dance festival and the Pioneer of Atlanta Dance award.

The 24-hour dance festival is a project in which choreographers and dancers are locked in studios for 24 hours to create work. At the end of the 24-hour period, all of these works are presented and then the top two pieces perform their newly created works to open the core show.

The Pioneer of Atlanta Dance award commemorates an individual who has contributed to the regional dance community. Choreographer and modern dance pioneer Ruth Mitchell, former dancer for Jose Limon and Ruth Page and director of Ruth Mitchell Dance Company, was the inaugural recipient in 2015. In 2016, the award was presented to Mozell Spriggs, founder of the Spelman College Dance Program. In 2017, it honored Bobby and Virginia Barnett. Lee Harper is the recipient of the 2018 award.

Over the past two decades, Full Radius Dance has presented more than 65 companies and independent choreographers, and paid over $30,000 in honorariums to MAD participants. Entering its 24th year, the upcoming festival will be held May 2018 at the Balzer Theatre at Herren's in downtown Atlanta.
