= Eden Mulholland =

New Zealand composer and dancer (born 1979)

Eden Mulholland (born 1979) is a New Zealand composer, musician and dancer. He was a founder of the band Motocade and composes for dance and the World of Wearable Art show.

== Early life and education ==
Mulholland was born in 1979. He grew up in Christchurch and attended Shirley Boys' High School. He came from a musical household: his father was in a band, his mother played the piano, all of the five children played and sang and he later played in bands with his older brothers Will and Jol. As a child he learnt ballet, studying with Russell Kerr and then completing a performing arts degree at Unitec where he graduated in 1998.

== Career ==
In his career as a dancer Mulholland worked with choreographers Ann Dewey and Sean Durham, and dance companies Touch Compass and Black Grace.

In 2003, when he spent time in London, Mulholland began to compose electronic music and decided to concentrate on music composition. On returning to New Zealand he founded the indie–rock band Motocade with his brother Will. He also played in the indie band the Mots with another brother Jol.

As a composer of dance music Mulholland has worked with the companies Atamira Dance Company and Okareka Dance led by Taiaroa Royal and Taane Mete. Choreographers Michael Parmenter, Sarah Foster-Sproull and Malia Johnston have commissioned him to write works and he has composed three ballet scores for Foster-Sproull including To Hold and Autumn Ball. His album Music for Dance includes sounds tracks from Johnston's dance works. He composed the score of Meremere (2016) a dance piece performed by wheelchair dancer Rodney Bell and directed by Malia Johnston. In 2018, he collaborated with Johnston and video artist Rowan Pierce to create Rushes a combination of live music and dance and video art performed in multiple spaces.

Mulholland composed the music for the opening ceremony of the 2023 FIFA Women's World Cup held in New Zealand and Australia. From 2022 to 2024, he has been the composer and music director for the World of Wearable Art show in Wellington.

Mulholland currently lives in Brisbane.

== Awards and honours ==
Mulholland has won two awards at the Wellington Theatre Awards: in 2018 he won the Sound Designer of the Year for Meremere and Rushes, and in 2019 he won the Constance Scott Kirkcaldie Award for Outstanding Composer of Music for the dance work Orchids.

== Discography ==
- Music for dance (2010) – music for dance and theatre
- Feed the beast (2013)
- Hunted, haunted (2015)
- A bee might bite my nose (2023) – an album for children
