= Tempo Dance Festival =

Dance festival in New Zealand

- Genre: dance festival
- Frequency: annual
- Locations: Auckland, New Zealand
- Established: 2003
- Founders: New Zealand Dance Festival Trust & Northern Dance Network

Tempo Dance Festival is an annual pan-genre professional dance festival held in Auckland, New Zealand and is the 'longest standing annual dance event' of New Zealand, founded in 2003.

== History ==
Tempo Dance Festival started in 2003 from an initiative from the Northern Dance Network, originally named the Auckland Dance Festival (2000-2002). New Zealand Dance Festival Trust is a registered charitable trust that operates under the trading name of Tempo Dance Festival. Part of the mission of Tempo Dance Festival is to, "champion diversity and inclusion and enrich and connect diverse communities through the language of dance".

== People ==
Past directors have included Sonja Bright (2000-2004), Mary Jane O'Reilly (2006-2011), Celia Walmsley, 2012-2014, Carrie Rae Cunningham 2015-2018. Cat Ruka was appointed in February 2019 and left at the end of 2020. In March 2021 there were seven new trustee's appointed. As at September 2021 the trustees were Aaron Huata, Cathy Livermore, Jeremy Poi, Liora Bercovitch, Olivia Taouma, Piripi Morunga, Elisabeth Vaneveld, Tia Louise Reihana and Paul Lee Young. Funders of the festival include Creative New Zealand, Foundation North and Auckland Council. Past trustees include Dr Nicole Bassett, Marama Lloydd, Suzanne Smith, Geordan Wilcox, Kerryn McMurdo, Dr Rose Campbell and Elizabeth Ross.

== Programme ==
The goal is 'to bring dance in all its forms to Auckland and promote the talents of up and coming artists'. Regular programmes include Secondary Colours for high schools, Tertiary Improvisation Showcase for tertiary level dance and Bloom (previously Fresh), for emerging choreographers or for a change of artistic direction. It has been held every year in Auckland on the land of Ngāti Whātua ki Ōrākei until 2020 when the COVID 19 pandemic made the organisers move it fully online.

=== 2011 Tempo Dance Festival ===
For the first time Tuakana: Maori Contemporary Showcase was programmed.

=== 2012 Tempo Dance Festival ===
Featured was Okareka Dance Company’s Nga Hau E Wha, Daniel Belton’s Time Dance & Soma Songs, Sesilia Pusiaki’s Pukepuke ‘o Tonga, and Colours of India. The programme included Dunedin based Indian Classical Dance teacher and performer Swaroopa Unni with Sringaram (Romantic Love) at Q Theatre. Programme again in 2012 was Tuakana: Maori Contemporary Showcase featuring work by Tia Reihana, Cat Ruka, Merenia Gray, Kura Te Ua, artists from Hawaiki Tu Productions and Nga Mana Whakairo a Toi (Q Theatre).

=== 2013 Tempo Dance Festival ===
This year was the 10th year anniversary and included a Gala with performances from Michael Parmenter, Pasifika Sway, the Royal New Zealand Ballet, Justin Haiu and Tupua Tigafua aka the Double Derelicts, Kura Te Ua and Ngarino Watts, Mary Jane O'Reilly, Touch Compass, Unitec students, and Monisha Kumar. The festival programmed 34 dance performances including Fatu Na Toto - Planted Seeds by Tupe Lualua (Le Moana Productions).

=== 2014 Tempo Dance Festival ===
In 2014 dancer and choreographer Alexa Wilson presented two shows at Tempo, Q&Q with A&A, a collaboration with dance artist Anna Bate and The Status of Being, a full-length work for Footnote Dance Company.

=== 2016 Tempo Dance Festival ===
Taumata is the name of the closing performance of the 2016 festival at Q Theatre. This contained four works, Bianca Hyslop's A Murmuration, Taane Mete's solo Manawa, Sarah Foster-Sproull's Sisters of the Back Crow, and Loughlan Prior's Eve (Royal New Zealand Ballet). Rodney Bell premiered his solo performance work Meremere (a collaboration with director Malia Johnston and Movement of the Human).

=== 2017 Tempo Dance Festival ===
The 2017 festival included at Q Theatre Orchids choreographed by Sarah Foster-Sproull, The Danz Season of Limbs@40 celebrating 40 years of the company Limbs with works by Mary Jane O’Reilly, Douglas Wright and Mark Baldwin, A World, with Your Wound in It by Jahra Rager and Inferno by Coven, a performance activation collective from South Auckland. In the Aotea Square was Pedal Power, by choreographer Susan Jordan a free community event involving dancing with bicycles for seniors.

=== 2018 Tempo Dance Festival ===
Headlining the 2018 festival was Los Angeles Contemporary Dance Company with ADAPTATION containing four works, EBBA, Stimulaze, FAM (duet excerpt) and Sporty.

=== 2019 Tempo Dance Festival ===
The programme included GIRL by Parris Goebel, Pōhutu by Bianca Hyslop and Rowan Pierce, NZ Music Double Bill: Dances with Aldous by Zahra Killeen-Chance, Josie Archer and Kosta Bogoievski, Fa’asinomaga/Identity by Sau E Siva Creatives and Not Odd Human by New Zealand School of Dance with Sam Coren.

=== 2020 Tempo Dance Festival ===
As the global pandemic took hold Tempo offered a year-round programme online programme with three seasons free of charge called ‘#GoingDigital’. The third season was called Putiputi, and ran through November and December. One item a dance film Beneath Sky Snakes by Cameron McMillan, in collaboration with the Govett-Brewster Gallery, a work in response to Len Lye’s sculpture Sky Snakes.

== Tempo Dance Festival Honours ==
People who have made a significant contribution to dance in New Zealand nominated by peers and chosen by the Board of New Zealand Dance Festival Trust to be honoured.

2008 Glenn Mayo

2009 Debra McCulloch

2010 Douglas Wright (as a choreographer) and Tairoa Royal (as a dancer)

2011 Dorothea Ashbridge

2012 Mary Jane O’Reilly

2013 Deidre Tarrant

2014 Jacqui Cesan

2015 Katie Haines

2016 Lynn Pringle

2018 Russell Kerr
