= Jack Gray (choreographer) =

New Zealand choreographer, educator and artistic director (b. 1977)

Jack Gray is a New Zealand choreographer, researcher and teacher of contemporary Māori dance.

== Background ==
Gray was born in 1977 in Te Atatu Peninsula, Auckland, New Zealand. He affiliates to the Māori iwi Te Rarawa, Ngāpuhi and Ngāti Porou. He studied at Unitec completing the performing and screen arts bachelor's degree in 1998. Later in 2004 he did a diploma of computer graphic design at Natcoll Design Technology New Zealand. He lives and works in Auckland.

== Career ==
Gray founded Atamira Dance Company with Louise Potiki Bryant in 2000. Gray also started his own dance company called Jack Gray Dance. Works created with this company include View From the Gods that was in the Tempo Dance Festival in 2006 and Tuawhenua which had a season at BATS Theatre in 2008 featuring dancers Shannon Mutu and Nancy Wijohn and a combination of electronic music with traditional Māori instruments performed by Charlotte90 and Alistair Fraser.

In 2012 Gray choreographed Moko for the Atamira Dance Company.

He was appointed artistic director of Atamira Dance Company in 2018 following on from Moss Paterson. In 2015 after five years of research Atamira presented Mitimiti created by Gray. It was performed in the round at Q Theatre in Auckland and brought in stories of other indigenous peoples alongside Māori including Australia, Guåhan (Guam), and the Kiowa People (Oklahoma).

Gray has travelled for his work and research and has collaborated with other dancers in the United States, especially with queer or indigenous focus, including: Dancing Earth Creations (New Mexico), Bernice Pauahi Bishop Museum (Hawai‘i), University of California, Riverside and the University of California, Berkeley.

Te Wheke is the new work for 2021 programmed in the Kia Mau Festival in Wellington and ASB Waterfront Theatre, Auckland. It is the 21st birthday production for Atamira and in the creation includes dance practitioners Jack Gray, Sean MacDonald, Taane Mete, Kelly Nash, Dolina Wehipeihana, Gabrielle Thomas, Kura Te Ua, Bianca Hyslop and Louise Potiki Bryant.

== Residencies and memberships ==
- Asian/Pacific/American Institute at NYU - Spring 2016 - Artist-in-Residence
- Toi Iho (a Māori trademark) - 2016 - membership
