= Louise Potiki Bryant =

New Zealand choreographer, dancer and video artist

- Occupations: Choreographer; dancer; video artist
- Awards: Harriet Friedlander Residency 2014; Arts Foundation Laureate 2019

Louise Mary Potiki Bryant is a New Zealand choreographer, dancer and video artist. She has choreographed a number of award-winning performances, and is a founding member of Atamira Dance Company. She designs, produces and edits videos of performances for music videos, dance films and video art installations. She was made an Arts Foundation of New Zealand Laureate in 2019.

Potiki Bryant's works are frequently accompanied by music composed by her husband, musician Paddy Free, and she often collaborates with other artists, including clay sculptor Paerau Corneal, singer-songwriter Ariana Tikao, scholar Te Ahukaramū Charles Royal and Canadian multidisciplinary artist Santee Smith.

== Early life and education ==
Potiki Bryant grew up in Dunedin. Her tribal affiliations are Ngāi Tahu, Kāti Māmoe and Waitaha, and her marae is Ōtākou Marae. She has had an interest in family history and cultural change since she was a child, and many of her works are inspired by her whakapapa. She also learned kapa haka as a child.

She graduated from the University of Otago in 1999 with a Bachelor of Arts majoring in Māori Studies, then completed a Bachelor of Performing and Screen Arts majoring in choreography at Unitec Institute of Technology in 2000. It was while at Unitec, tutored by Shona McCullagh, that she began making short dance films and experimenting with video. She also began collaborating with Rachael Rakena on a dance video installation called Tūranga.

== Career ==
Potiki Bryant is a founding member of Atamira Dance Company, having been invited to join the new company by choreographer Jack Gray shortly after graduating from the University of Otago. Works she has choreographed for the company include Te Aroha me te mamae (a 2003 work based on the life of a Ngāi Tahu mother and grandmother and her experiences under colonisation), Ngāi Tahu 32 (awarded Best Contemporary Dance Production 2004 by the New Zealand Listener), TAONGA: Dust Water Wind (awarded Best Production, Best Music and Best Scenography at the 2010 Tempo Dance Festival) and Onepū (a 2018 work based on legends told by Ngāi Tahu about female deities who control the wind). She has also choreographed works for The New Zealand Dance Company, Black Grace and Ōrotokare, Art, Story, Motion.

In addition to her choreography, Potiki Bryant designs, produces and edits videos of performances for music videos, dance films and video art installations, as well as designing the background set pieces and installations. She designed videos for the Kaha:wi Dance Theatre productions Re-Quickening, Blood Tides and Blood Water Earth. The latter, a video installation and performance series, was presented at Te Uru Waitakere Contemporary Gallery as part of the Auckland Arts Festival in 2015. Other notable works include Whakaruruhau (a 2003 dance installation and film about the Āraiteuru Marae, which was destroyed by fire in 1997 and subsequently rebuilt), the dance show Nohopuku (for which she received the Stand-out Performer, Best Dance and Best of Fringe Awards at the Dunedin Fringe Festival in 2009), and the dance show Tumutumu (awarded Most Innovative Choreography at Kowhiti Dance 2011). With clay sculptor Paerau Corneal she created the interdisciplinary work Kiri, which opened the Tempo Dance Festival 2014 and was subsequently performed at the Festival of Pacific Arts 2016 in Guam. Kiri, which means skin in Māori, features Bryant being coated in clay by Corneal. A review in The New Zealand Herald described it as a "stunning collaboration", featuring "Bryant's lithe, beautiful and deeply expressive body tracing the evolution of rock, through water, to clay and, in Corneal's strong hands, the female form".

Almost all of her works feature music by her husband Paddy Free, who is part of Christchurch electronic duo Pitch Black. Another frequent collaborator is singer-songwriter Ariana Tikao, with Potiki Bryant creating the music video for Tikao's song "TUIA", which received an award for Best Music Video at the imagineNATIVE Film and Media Arts Festival in 2009. Free, Tikao and Potiki Bryant worked together to create Onepū, a 2018 dance work which toured New Zealand in 2019, and Te Taki o te Ua / The Sound of Rain, a video installation art project which formed part of the 2021 Festival of Colour in Wānaka. From 2005 to 2013 she collaborated with artist and academic Te Ahukaramū Charles Royal to produce artworks including dance work Te Kārohirohi: The Light Dances (2010–2012) and the community project Whakaahua: Coming to Form (2014), which was based on his research into traditional Māori houses of entertainment (whare tapere). She drew on this work to create Te Motutapu-o-Tinirau in 2015, a 40-minute work for 20 performers, developed in collaboration with Rua McCallum.

== Awards and residencies ==
Potiki Bryant was the Ngāi Tahu Artist in Residence at the Dunedin School of Art in 2003. In the same year she was named Best New Choreographer by the New Zealand Listener magazine. In 2007 she held a six-week Wild Creations Residency, funded by the Department of Conservation and Creative New Zealand, which enabled her to work at Aoraki / Mt Cook and create the short film Aoraki which was screened at international film festivals. In 2009 she was funded by Creative New Zealand to undertake an internship with Santee Smith, the artistic director of Kaha:wi Dance Theatre based in Toronto. She and Smith have collaborated on a number of multimedia video and dance works.

In 2014 she received the Caroline Plummer Fellowship in Community Dance from the University of Otago. In the same year she was the recipient of the Harriet Friedlander Residency, which allowed her to live and work in New York City in 2016. She was made an Arts Foundation Laureate in 2019.
