= Dorothea Ashbridge =

New Zealand ballet dancer, choreographer, teacher, and judge (1928–2021)

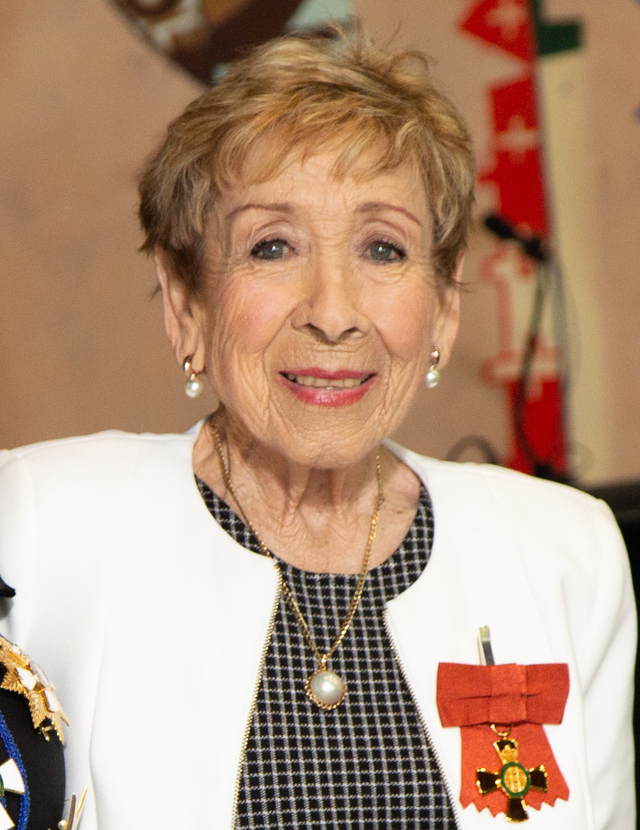
Ashbridge in 2019

Dorothea Ashbridge ONZM (née Zaymes; 4 March 1928 – 30 December 2021) was a South African-born New Zealand ballet dancer, choreographer, teacher and international ballet judge.

== Early life ==
Ashbridge was born in Cape Town, South Africa, in 1928, one of eight children. She studied ballet from an early age. At age 17 she left South Africa for London after an invitation from the Sadler's Wells Ballet School.

== Career ==
Ashbridge joined the Sadler's Wells Ballet three months after arriving at the Ballet School. There she danced with famous dancers including Margot Fonteyn, Robert Helpmann and Moira Shearer and New Zealand dancer Rowena Jackson.

In 1966, after emigrating to New Zealand, Ashbridge branched out from ballet to choreograph pop music television shows C'mon! and Happen Inn.

Ashbridge taught a number of New Zealand dancers and choreographers including Douglas Wright, Mark Baldwin and dancers in the Limbs Dance Company where she was the resident ballet mistress from 1979 to 1989. She taught at ballet schools in Auckland, at summer schools, the New Zealand Ballet Company and from 1991 to 2001 she was a classical ballet coach at UNITEC in Auckland.

Ashbridge served on the jury of World Ballet Competitions held in France, China and Japan.

In 2007 Ashbridge performed in a duet with Debra McCulloch at the Tempo Dance Festival; the dance was choreographed by Mary Jane O'Reilly. She was honoured by the Festival in 2011.

== Honours and awards ==
Ashbridge was appointed an Officer of the New Zealand Order of Merit, for services to ballet, in the 2019 Queen's Birthday Honours.

Ashbridge died on 30 December 2021.

== Personal life ==
Ashbridge married her husband New Zealander Bryan Ashbridge in 1958. He was a dancer with the Royal Ballet. They had one son born in 1965 and shortly after his birth they moved to New Zealand. They divorced in the 1970s.
