= Christchurch Arts Festival =

Arts festival in Christchurch, New Zealand

- Genre: Arts festival
- Frequency: Varied (bi-annually and annually)
- Location: Christchurch
- Country: New Zealand
- Years active: 1995–2023
- Major events: Music, theatre, dance, literature

Christchurch Arts Festival was a festival in the city of Christchurch, New Zealand that began in 1995 and was wound up in 2023.

== History ==
The first Christchurch Arts Festival was held in 1995 and came after the establishment of other regional festivals the Taranaki Arts Festival in 1991 and the Nelson Arts Festival in 1994. The Auckland Arts Festival was not established until 2003 and the festival in Wellington was the New Zealand International Arts Festival started in 1986. Earlier festivals in Christchurch did also exist, including a Pan Pacific Arts Festival 1965 and 1968.

Around 93,000 people attended the 2001 festival with more than 300 performances over 19 days. Guy Boyce was the festival director. Guy Boyce was the festival director again in 2003, the festival was titled Applaud and was the fifth biennial festival. In the programme was included ballet with Romeo and Juliet (the Royal New Zealand Ballet), White (the Southern Ballet) and theatre with The Daylight Atheist by Tom Scott and The Book of Fame, a play about the 1905 Originals rugby union tour of Britain.

The festival in 2006 included The Press Christchurch Writers Festival co-directed by Ruth Todd and Morrin Rout.

In 2011, the festival was held in August and September in Hagley Park due to the 2011 Christchurch earthquake destroying many venues. Philip Tremewan was the director in 2011, and Steph Walker was the General Manager. Tremewan was appointed by the Christchurch Arts Festival Trust in 2010, the chairperson of the Trust was Clare Murray. In 2013 the festival ran over five weeks with more than 50 events.

Craig Cooper was appointed director in 2014. By 2015 the festival was running every two years and included a literary festival in collaboration with WORD Christchurch. The programme in 2015 also included the Christchurch Symphony Orchestra, Julia Deans, Delgirl, The Royal New Zealand Ballet and Tim Finn. A popular musical That Bloody Woman about suffragette Kate Sheppard debuted at the Festival in 2015.

In 2019, the festival refocused to be on local arts and had a new director.

In 2023, the Christchurch Arts Festival Trust wound up the festival with chairperson Jane Gregg saying it was the “end of an era". The festival had sustained years of financial loss. Assets were transferred to WORD Christchurch.
