= Dance Aotearoa New Zealand =

National support organisation for dance in New Zealand

- Abbreviation: DANZ
- Formation: November 1, 1993; 32 years ago
- Legal status: Not-for-profit
- Headquarters: Ground floor, 65 Abel Smith Street PO Box 9885, Wellington 6141
- Location: New Zealand
- Executive Director: Sheryl Lowe
- Board of directors: Doreen Bestmann, Perry Walker, Jonathan Baker, Karen Fraser Payne, Kristal Snow, Merenia Gray, Sheryle Lowe
- Website: https://danz.org.nz/

Dance Aotearoa New Zealand (DANZ) is the national support organisation for dance in New Zealand, founded in 1993. It is a not-for-profit, with a stated mission "to make dance visible" through "the promotion of dance and the provision of services to the dance sector in all its diversity." In 2019 it failed to gain funding from Creative New Zealand and sought a judicial review of the funding decision in 2021.

== History ==
DANZ is the national support organisation for dance in New Zealand. It is a not-for-profit, with a stated mission is "to make dance visible" through "the promotion of dance and the provision of services to the dance sector in all its diversity." DANZ was established in 1993, and was initially focussed on ballet and contemporary dance. It has since expanded to provide support for all dance forms. The 2013/2014 SPARC 'active New Zealanders' survey found that three times the number of adults regularly dance as play rugby. DANZ is based in the Toi Pōneke Arts Centre in Wellington.

Directors of DANZ have included Sudha Rao, Amanda Skoog and Philip Tremewen, who became executive director in 2000. In late 2004 Tania Kopytko took over, and was still director in 2013 for DANZ's 20th anniversary events during the Wellington Dance Festival. In 2021 the director is Sheryl Lowe, who succeeded a three-year term by Anton Carter. Susan Jordan established the Tāmaki (Auckland) office of DANZ in 2005 and was the regional manager for 10 years.

== Activities ==
DANZ publishes a monthly newsletter for members, as well as the quarterly DANZ Magazine. It also provides dance residencies, a Growing Professional Skills programme, masterclasses, workshops, seminars and talks. DANZ coordinated a National Dance Hui, focused on contemporary dance, in 2016.

== New Zealand Dance Week ==
In 2016 DANZ established the National Dance Week, also called New Zealand Dance Week, held during the last week of April each year, to coincide with International Dance Day (29 April). The 2017 event was launched in Auckland by award-winning choreographer Parris Goebel. In 2019 the event was launched in Palmerston North, the first time it had been launched outside of a major centre, and overlapped with NZ Music Month allowing for some crossover events. The keynote address was made by Rodney Bell.

== DANZ Māori Choreolab/Te Kanikani Whakamatau ==
DANZ offers a placement funded by Auckland City Council in 2016 and Foundation North in 2018. The inaugural recipient in 2016 was Bianca Hyslop, a member of Atamira Dance Company, who was paired with mentor Merenia Gray to create a new work over six weeks for public performance at Te Pou and the Mangere Arts Centre. The 2018 recipient of the Chorelab was Tru Paraha, who spent three weeks creating a short film ANON.

== Legal challenge ==
DANZ has historically been funded through Creative New Zealand. In 2019 they were receiving $350,000 pa through the Toi Tōtara Haemata investment programme. In 2019 DANZ made two applications for funding from Creative New Zealand, seeking to double their funding in light of an increase of $27 million in Creative New Zealand's investment in the arts. Both of the DANZ funding proposals failed, leaving DANZ with no Creative New Zealand funding. After failing to resolve the issue through a complaint process, DANZ sough a judicial review in 2021 claiming that Creative New Zealand had illegally interfered in the scores made by an independent panel assessing their application for funding, by suggesting what the scores should be. Creative New Zealand said that the scores were lowered at their suggestion because the external panel had misunderstood the assessment criteria. As a result of the final scoring, Creative New Zealand awarded DANZ no funding, and DANZ said in court that this would likely result in the closure of the organisation. The decision not to fund DANZ also meant that they were ineligible to receive COVID-19 emergency funding. The parties also disagree over whether DANZ is the peak dance body in New Zealand. The case concluded on 28 June 2021, with judge Christine Grice reserving her decision.
