= The New Zealand Dance Company =

Contemporary dance company in New Zealand

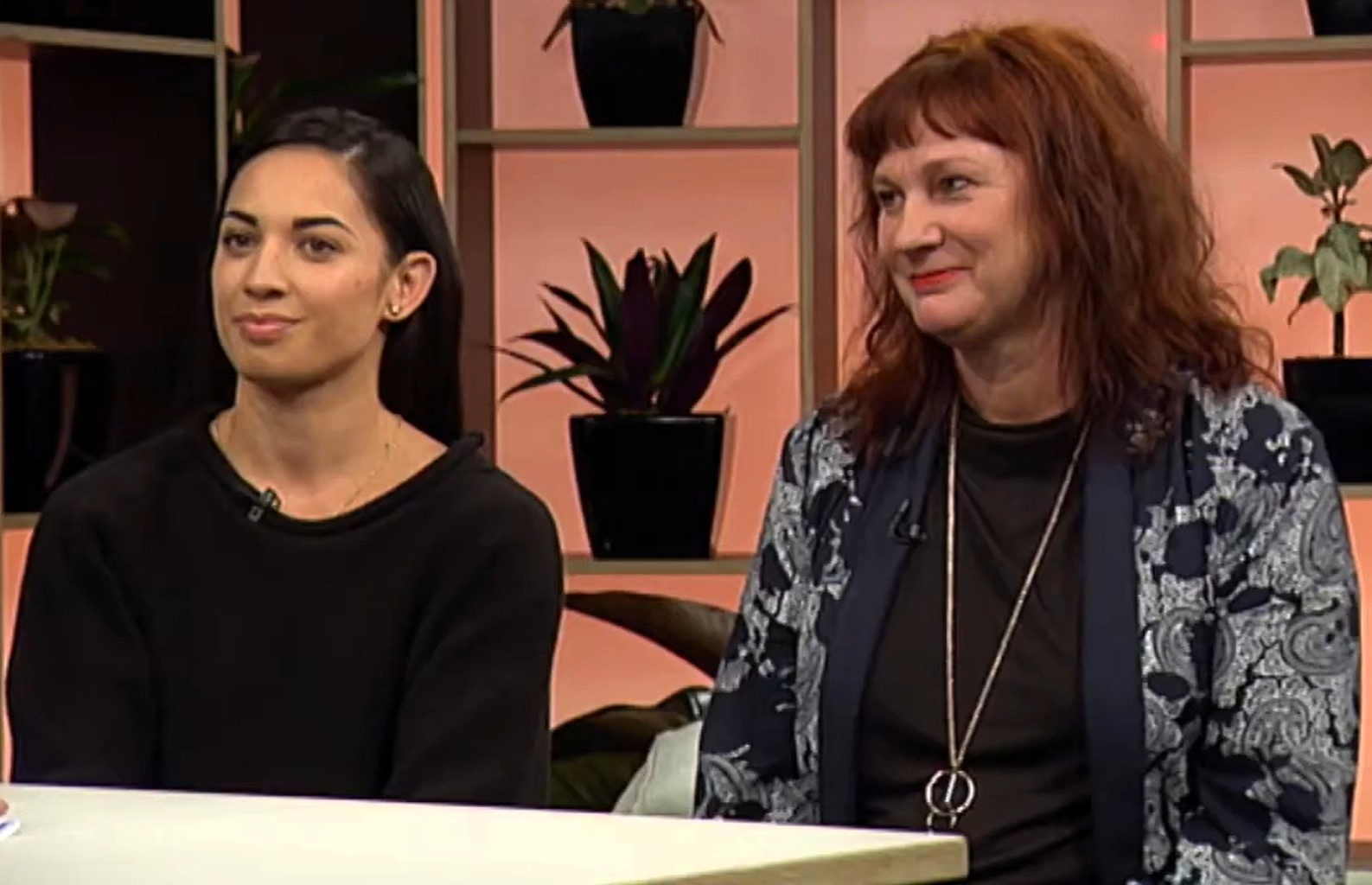
Left to right: New Zealand Dance Company dancer Chrissy Kokiri, director Shona McCullagh, in 2017

The New Zealand Dance Company (incorporated as The New Zealand Dance Advancement Trust) is an Auckland based, nationally focused contemporary dance company.

The company sought to break the paradigm of dance companies operating on a project by project basis, presenting work by one choreographer, and moved instead to a sustainable model of presenting a variety of choreographic works.

== About ==
The New Zealand Dance Company (NZDC) was founded in 2012 by former Limbs Dance Company member Shona McCullagh and the founding General Manager Frances Turner. Like Limbs, the NZDC company commissions work from New Zealand and international choreographers. Part of the mission was to support new talent and utilise dancers and choreographers who had left New Zealand. The founding production was the Language of Living, featuring choreographers Michael Parmenter, Justin Haiu, Sarah Foster-Sproull and Shona McCullagh.

NZDC has developed more than 27 new works by choreographers from New Zealand, Australia, Holland and South Korea and has toured internationally including to the Holland Dance Festival, Australia, Germany, Liverpool, France, Belgium, Luxembourg and Canada.

In addition to a professional Company, NZDC has a Youth and Community Engagement Programme of weekly classes, masterclasses and workshops for all ages and levels – including an over 60s Feisty Feet class.

In 2011 Creative New Zealand funded the new venture of The New Zealand Dance Company and Westpac bank sponsored.

== Dancers ==
- 'Isope 'Akau'ola
- Anya Down
- Eden Kew
- Caterina Moreno

== Management ==
- Chief Executive/Artistic Director – Moss Te Ururangi Patterson
- Finance & Operations Manager – Christine Rice

== Works ==
Production	Date	Location	Choreographers	Notes
Stage of Being	2023	Auckland: ASB Waterfront Theatre,	Tupua Tigifua (LittleBits and AddOns), Xin Ji & Xiao Chao Wen (Made in Them)	
What They Said	2022	Auckland Q Theatre	Jo Lloyd	
ArteFact	2022, 2023	New Zealand Tour	Ross McCormack	
Night Light	2022, 2023	Auckland: ASB Waterfront Theatre	Tor Colombus and Eddie Elliott	
This Fragile Planet	2020	Auckland Fringe Festival; Hamilton Gardens Arts Festival	Nina Nawalowalo and Tom McCrory (The Conch), Ross McCormack	
International Tours	2014–2024	Canada; Belgium; Luxemburg; Paris; Liverpool; Germany; Australia; Netherlands		
Matariki for Tamariki	2019–2023	Auckland; Northland	Sean McDonald	
Kiss the Sky	2017, 2019	Bay of Islands; Wanaka; Invercargill; Wellington; New Plymouth; Nelson; Hamilton; Auckland	KIM Jae Duk, Victoria Columbus, Stephanie Lake, Sue Healey	
Tamaki Tour	2016–2025	Auckland	Sean McDonald, Mia Mason, Lucy Marinkovich, Chrissy Kokiri, Taniora Motutere, Ashleigh Perriot, Tupua Tigafua, Bianca Hyslop, Scott Ewen, Omea Geary, Malia Johnston, Joshua Cesan	
Lumina	2015, 2016 ,2018	Germany; Netherlands; Paris; Liverpool; Hamilton; Christchurch; Nelson; Auckland; Whangarei; Napier; Wellington; New Plymouth	Stephen Shropshire, Louise Potiki Bryant, Malia Johnston	
OrphEus – A Dance Opera	2018	Auckland Festival; New Zealand Festival, Wellington	Michael Parmenter	
The Absurdity of Humanity	2016, 2017	New Plymouth; Marlborough; Christchurch; Wellington; Auckland		
Rotunda	2013, 2014, 2015	Tauranga; Wellington; Christchurch; Dunedin; Auckland; Adelaide; Melbourne; Parramatta; Geelong; Den Haag; Amsterdam	Shona McCullagh in collaboration with dancers	
Language of Living	2012, 2013, 2014	Invercargill; Christchurch; Nelson; New Plymouth; Tauranga; Auckland; Whangarei; Hawke's Bay; Wellington	Shona McCullagh, Michael Parmenter, Sarah Foster-Sproull, Justin Haiu, Tupua Tigafua, Anne Teresa De Keersmaeker	
Shaun Parker's Trolleys		UK; Spain; Belgium; France; Malaysia; Netherlands; Australia; Auckland	Shaun Parker	Argus Angel Award Winner (Brighton Festival, UK)
