= Annual Auckland Theatre Awards =

Annual performing arts awards in New Zealand

Auckland Theatre Awards
- Awarded for: excellence in the performing arts
- Country: New Zealand
- Established: 2008
- First award: 2008
- Final award: 2019
- Website: https://www.facebook.com/aktheatreawards

The Annual Auckland Theatre Awards (colloquially The Hackmans, and not to be confused with the Auckland Community Theatre Awards) are annual performing arts awards presented by in Auckland New Zealand. The awards are normally presented at the Civic Theatre in Auckland. The Excellence Awards were introduced in 2014, and are judged by a panel of four to six industry judges. There is also a People's Choice section of awards. The awards were founded by Kip Chapman and Rachel Forman in 2008, and handed over to Eli Matthewson and Sophie Dowson in 2014.

== Awards for 2020 ==
There were no awards presented for 2020.

== Awards for 2019 ==
The awards for 2019 were presented at the Civic on 16 January 2020.

Award	Winner	Notes
Excellence award for overall production	Working On My Night Moves	Production team Te Aihe Butler, Julia Croft, Sarah Foster-Sproull, Calvin Hudson, Nisha Madhan, Kate Prior, Ruby Reihana-Wilson, Meg Rollandi, Jason Wright and Lydia Zanetti. The judges described Working on My Night Moves as Croft and Madhan's "most uncomfortably intoxicating work to date". The show was developed at the Battersea Arts Centre in London.
Excellence award for overall production	Only Bones v1.0	By Kallo Collective, featuring Thom Monckton and Gemma Tweedie.
Excellence award for overall production	Pinay	New Zealand's first Filipino play, written by Marianne Infante, of Proudly Asian Theatre, and directed by James Roque, the judges commented it was "moving and heartfelt".
Excellence award for overall production	Yes Yes Yes	Yes Yes Yes, a play about consent, was designed for educational settings. Production team Eleanor Bishop, Rachel Marlow, Karin McCracken, Ruby Reihana-Wilson, Helen Sheehan and Lydia Zanetti.
Excellence award for overall production	Sing It To My Face	Barbarian Productions assembled different generations of community choirs to sing to each other about generational issues.
Excellence in direction	Sophie Roberts	For The Wolves
Excellence in performance	Arlo Green	For Homos
Excellence in leadership	Ahi Karunaharan	In 2019 Karunaharan directed two mainstage shows for Silo Theatre and Auckland Theatre Company, telling South Asian stories and featuring only South Asian performers.
Excellence in Design	Rachel Marlow, Nic Smillie and Rachael Walker	For Rosencrantz & Guildenstern are Dead
Outstanding newcomer award	Brady Peeti Ankita Singh	Peeti starred in Māori/Australian Aboriginal comedy, Black Ties. Singh runs her own production company, Oriental Maidens

== Awards for 2018 ==
The awards for 2018 were presented through a Facebook livestream rather than the usual live event at the Civic.

Award	Winner	Notes
Excellence for Overall Production	The Contours of Heaven	A one-woman show by Ana Scotney
Excellence for Overall Production	Burn Her	Written by Sam Brooks, produced by Smoke Labours Productions
Excellence for Overall Production	Hir	Silo Theatre's Hir
Excellence for Overall Production	Tea	Writer and directed by Ahi Karunaharan
Community Spirit Award	Nisha Madhan	For her mentoring work throughout the community
Excellence Award: Performance	Leon Wadham	For his Comedy Festival piece Giddy
Excellence Award: Performance	Goretti Chadwick	For Auckland Theatre Company's Still Life with Chickens.
Excellence Award: Performance	The ensemble cast of The Wizard of Otahuhu	Made up of 50 actors aged between from 9 to 30
Excellence in Sound Design	Claire Duncan	For Medusa
Excellence in Impact by a Company	Everybody Cool Lives Here	
Excellence in Lighting Design	Rachel Marlow	For her body of work in 2018
Outstanding Newcomer Awards	Marianne Infante Micheal McCabe Petmal Lam	
Emerging company	The Maumahara Girlie team	Producer Vanessa Crofskey & director/creator Mya Morrison-Middleton, with Whetu Silver, Freddy Carr, Amanda Tito and Onehou Strickland.

== Awards for 2017 ==
The 9th Annual Auckland Theatre Awards were presented in the Wintergarden at The Civic on 4 December 2017. The ceremony was hosted by Johanna Cosgrove and directed by Sam Snedden. Jacinda Ardern presented the Hackman Cup. Jennifer Ward-Lealand presented the Excellence Awards.

Award	Winner	Notes
Lifetime Achievement Award	Jeremy Collins	Developing Philips Selecon, one of the world’s foremost producers of luminaires for theatre, as well as providing mentorship and advocacy to others in the industry.
Excellence Award: Overall Body of Work	John Verryt	Set design
Excellence Award: Overall Body of Work	FAFSWAG	
Excellence Award: Overall Production	OTHER [chinese]	Directed by Alice Canton, produced by Julie Zhu
Excellence Award: Overall Production	Mirror, Mirror	Directed by Troy Tuua, produced by Mangere Arts Centre
Excellence Award: Overall Production	Nell Gwynn	Directed by Colin McColl, produced by Auckland Theatre Company
Excellence Award: Performance	Nicole Whippy	For The Mountaintop
Excellence Award: Performance	Rutene Spooner	For Super HUGH-Man
Excellence Award: Innovation of Form	Peter & the Wolf	Created by Sophie Roberts and Leon Radojkovic, produced by Silo Theatre
Excellence Award: Excellence in Adaptation	E Kore A Muri E Hokia (Mo & Jess Kill Susie)	by Te Rēhia Theatre
Excellence Award: Community Spirit	Auckland Fringe festival	
Hackman Cup for Most Original Production of the Year	OTHER [chinese]	

== Awards for 2016 ==
The awards for theatre during 2016 were presented on 5 December 2016. The Excellence awards, which were presented by Jennifer Ward-Lealand, were judged by former Metro editor Simon Wilson, producer Angela Green, The Pantograph Punch founding editor, Rosabel Tan, and actor and director Jason Te Kare.

Award	Winner	Notes
Lifetime Achievement Award	Carla Van Zon	
Excellence Award: Overall Production	Te Pō	Produced by Theatre Stampede, Nightsong Productions, Auckland Arts Festival and the New Zealand Festival. Presented at Q Theatre.
Excellence Award: Overall Production	Potato Stamp Megalomaniac	Produced by Pressure Point Collective and presented at The Basement Theatre
Excellence Award: Overall Production	That Bloody Woman	Produced by Auckland Theatre Company in association with The Court Theatre and The Christchurch Arts Festival. Presented at Sky City Theatre.
Excellence Award: Overall Production	The White Guitar	Produced by The Conch in association with the Christchurch Arts Festival. Presented at Q Theatre by Tour-Makers
Excellence Award: Overall Production	Don Juan	Produced by A Slightly Isolated Dog and presented as part of the Matchbox Season at Q Theatre.
Excellence Award: Direction	Anapela Polataivao	For her direction of the F.C.C production of Wild Dogs Under My Skirt, presented at Mangere Arts Centre.
Excellence Award: Performance	Morgana O'Reilly	For her performance as Vanda Jordan in the Auckland Theatre Company production of Venus in Fur, presented in the Herald Theatre
Excellence Award: Performance	Jennifer Ludlam	For her performance as Arthur in the Silo Theatre production of Boys Will Be Boys, presented at Q Theatre
Excellence Award: Design	Andrew Foster	For his set designs for Te Pō, To Kill a Mockingbird, Defending the J.J. Mac, Thomus & Vernon God Little, presented at Q Theatre, The Civic Theatre and The Basement Theatre
Excellence Award: Entrepreneurial Achievement	Lester McGrath	For his leadership as general manager of Auckland Theatre Company in the creation of the ASB Waterfront Theatre.
Best Newcomer Awards	Nicky Vella – Producer Natasha Hoyland – Stage Manager & Producer Tim Earl – Actor	

== Awards for 2015 ==
The awards for 2015 were awarded on 7 December of that year. The judges for the Excellence awards were Metro editor Simon Wilson, producer Angela Green, playwright Sam Brooks, actor and director Jason Te Kare, costume designer Elizabeth Whiting and vocal coach Linda Cartwright.

Award	Winner	Notes
Lifetime Achievement Award	George Henare CNZM, OBE	
Excellence Award: Overall Production	The Book of Everything	by Silo Theatre
Excellence Award: Overall Production	Little Shop of Horrors	by Live Live Cinema
Excellence Award: Overall Production	All Your Wants and Needs Fulfilled Forever	by PlayGround Collective
Excellence Award: Overall Production	Hudson & Halls Live!	by Silo Theatre
Excellence Award: Set Design and Lighting Design	Tony Rabbit	For A Doll's House
Excellence Award: Sound Design and Composition	Thomas Press	For his work throughout 2015
Best Newcomers	Christine Urquhart – Set & Costume designer Jordan Keyzer – Stage Manager & Producer Gaby Solomona - Actor	

== Awards for 2014 ==
The awards for 2014 were announced on 1 December of that year. The organisers introduced an Excellence Award section, judged by a panel of six. Jacinda Ardern, who was a Labour MP and shadow minister for the arts, presented some of the awards. A nationwide initiative to honour service and dedication to theatre was also premiered. The Service Honour medals were awarded for achieving 25, 50 or 100 professional productions. Recipients were Silo Theatre director Sophie Roberts, playwright Roger Hall and actor Jennifer Ward-Lealand.

Award	Winner	Notes
Lifetime Achievement Award	Linda Cartwright	Actor and vocal coach
Excellence Award for achieving excellence across all aspects of this ambitious production	Shane Bosher and team	Angels In America, Silo Theatre
Achieving excellence with its original concept and execution	360: A Theatre of Recollections	Theatre Stampede and Nightsong Productions
Achieving excellence in a wide range of performances	Stephen Lovatt	
Achieving excellence in lighting design	Jane Hakaraia	Various projects
Achieving excellence in all aspects of producing their debut production	Daffodils: Bullet Heart Club	
Achieving excellence in fostering new and emerging artists in Auckland City	The Basement Theatre	
Achieving excellence in physical performance	Trygve Wakenshaw	Various productions
Newcomer award	Lavinia Uhila - Producer and Actor Jess Sayer - Actor and Playwright Amanaki Prescott - Dancer, Actor and Playwright	
