= Taranaki Arts Festival =

Annual arts festival in New Zealand

- Frequency: Biannual
- Location: New Plymouth
- Country: New Zealand
- Inaugurated: March 1991
- Founders: Roger King and Grant Kerr
- Organiser: Taranaki Arts Festival Trust

Taranaki Arts Festival is a long-running biannual arts festival in the Taranaki region of New Zealand, founded in 1991 by Grant Kerr and Roger King. Initially it was the Taranaki International Arts Festival.

The Taranaki Arts Festival is managed by the Taranaki Arts Festival Trust (TAFT) a charitable trust. The Trust also manage other events in the Taranaki region including in some years WOMAD and the Taranaki Garden Festival.

== History ==
Inspired by the New Zealand Festival in Wellington the founders Grant Kerr and Roger King ran the first festival in March 1991. It was three weeks long. It was first known as the Taranaki International Arts Festival. The first festival had 150 shows and 500 artists including Douglas Wright, the New Zealand Symphony Orchestra, the Topp Twins, Shonagh McCullagh, Footnote Dance, The Warratahs and Sam Hunt.

David Inns joined the Taranaki Arts Festival Trust in 1992 and brought knowledge over eight years to the festival as he worked part of the year at the Edinburgh Fringe Festival and also the New Zealand Festival in Wellington.

Roger King was the director until 2009. Drew James has been the artistic director of the festival and was replaced by Suzanne Porter.

Craig Cooper was appointed in 2016 as the artistic director of the festival while he maintained his role of director at the Christchurch Arts Festival.

In 2021 a documentary was made commemorating thirty years since the first festival, in addition there was an exhibition of past festivals presented at the TSB Showplace in New Plymouth.

In 2025 the council supported the Trust financially with a risk all the festivals could fold including WOMAD Aotearoa in New Plymouth, the Taranaki Garden Festival, the Reimagine Arts festival and Winter Fest.
