= Chris Jannides =

New Zealand dancer

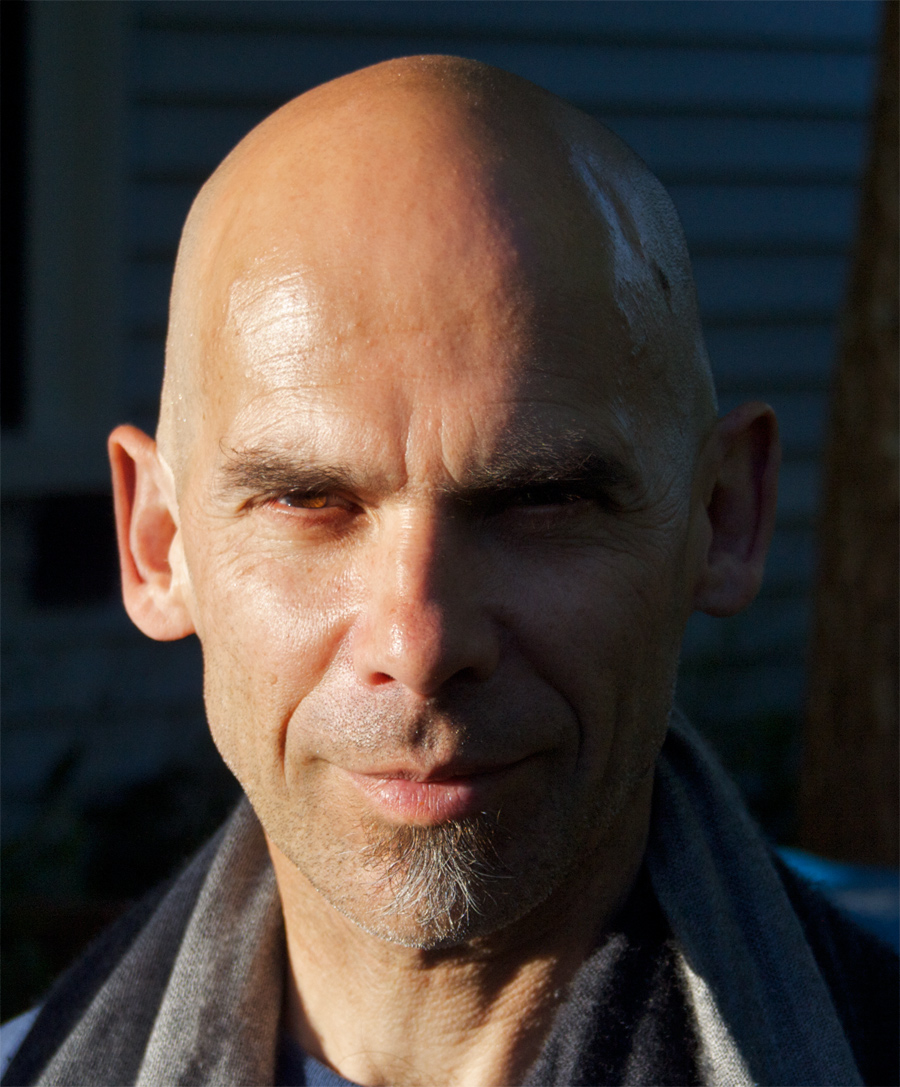
Chris Jannides 2010

Chris Jannides (born 1954 in Wellington, New Zealand) is a founding dancer, choreographer and artistic director of Limbs Dance Company in Auckland, New Zealand.

This pioneering New Zealand contemporary dance company was established in June 1977 soon after Chris Jannides and Friends presented their inaugural performance as a lunchtime show in the Maidment Arts Centre at Auckland University. Soon after that show, dancer, teacher and studio owner Mary Jane O'Reilly and Jannides and Friends joined forces, collectively becoming Limbs Dance Company, with Jannides as artistic director.

The new company was hungry for input, taking classes in improvisation, classical ballet, modern dance, jazz, hatha yoga, voice and creative drama. To fund their activities, the company members taught classes in jazz, modern dance, movement for actors, improvisation, undertook commercial modelling engagements, and presented public and schools performances.

Jannides left Limbs in 1980 and moved to Sydney, Australia. After a period as a freelance choreographer and teacher, in 1988 he formed the dance-in-education company Darc Swan which he led for 15 years, building to an annual audience of around 100,000 young people.

Jannides remained with Darc Swan until exhaustion led him to relocate to the land of his father's ancestors - Greece. Spiritual rejuvenation and tranquillity was foreshortened by the offer to become Head of Dance at UNITEC where he led the programme for 9 years, again placing a high priority on the creative interests of the student. He completed an MA during his tenure at UNITEC, investigating models for the optimal career preparation of pre-professional dance artists.

During 2010 while undertaking doctoral studies in the UK, he returned to UNITEC to make a dance work commissioned as part of the 21st birthday celebrations of the dance programme.

In 2012, Jannides completed his practice-based PhD in the dance programme at the University of Chichester with a project titled 'The SocioKinetic-bodymApp, an Improvisation Tool for a Dance and Movement Practice'. His dissertation is available to download from his website.

He is currently (2014, 2015, 2016, 2017) Senior Movement Tutor for acting students at Toi Whakaari, the NZ Drama School, where he is developing the movement curriculum as well as using his doctoral research as a teaching tool for the training of both actors and dancers. He is continuing to extend aspects of his bodymAPP tools, offering workshops, conference presentations, writing poetry and reviews, and creating performance projects.
