= Nisha Madhan =

New Zealand actor, director and producer

- Born: 1981 or 1982 (age 44–45); New Delhi, India
- Occupations: Actor, director and producer
- Known for: Shortland Street

Nisha Madhan (born 1981 or 1982) is a New Zealand actor, director and producer with experience in film, theatre and television. She appeared on the New Zealand soap opera Shortland Street for three years. She is a regular performer in theatres in New Zealand and has appeared both nationally and internationally in theatre productions including with the Indian Ink Theatre Company. Madhan has also created, produced and directed theatre shows including co-creating and directing the award-winning Working On My Night Moves.

== Background ==
Madhan is from New Delhi but grew up in Qatar. She moved to New Zealand when she was a teenager, and attended Northcote College. She went on to study performing arts at Unitec. Madhan has also trained at École Philippe Gaulier in Paris.

== Career ==
As an actor Madhan has appeared in New Zealand television shows including the comedy / drama series Rude Awakenings (2006). She spent three years from 2007 in the role of Shanti in New Zealand's longest-running television drama and soap opera series Shortland Street. She was the first Indian actress to take a key role in the cast of this popular series. There was a strong reaction from followers of Shortland Street when the character played by Madhan died, and some said that it would lead to the end of the show. Madhan had guest roles in the New Zealand crime drama series The Blue Rose in 2012, and Agent Anna II in 2014.

Since 2002, she has acted in numerous theatre productions mostly in Auckland including as Blitzen in The Reindeer Monologues directed by Cameron Rhodes at the Herald Theatre in the Aotea Centre. She teamed up creatively with experimental artist Stephen Bain co-creating Beckett Says (2010) and What Have You Done to Me? (2011) which toured to Finland. In the 2012 New Performance Festival also held at the Aotea Centre, Madhan with Alexa Wilson, created and performed an avant-garde self-referential work entitled Show Pony. In 2015, Madhan had three roles in the Indian Ink Theatre Company production, The Elephant Thief. Prior to this she was also a member of the cast of Kiss the Fish, another Indian Ink Theatre Company production. In 2018 Madhan directed Julia Croft in the play Power Ballad that toured New Zealand, Australia and parts of the United Kingdom.

As a theatre maker and director Madhan was the co-creator and director of the award-winning Working On My Night Moves at Auckland's Basement Theatre in 2019. In 2020 Madham was commissioned by arts and culture journal Pantograph Punch to produce a podcast. Also in 2020 Madham obtained a role in the New Zealand webseries Life is Easy. As at June 2021, Madhan is the Programmer at The Basement Theatre in Auckland working alongside Cat Ruka. She said of programming HEtheyShe by non-binary BIPOC (Māori/Samoan) poet Cypris Afakasi and Arts Laureate Moe Laga:

“I’m a strong believer that artists do an important and specific job. They process the world around them in real-time and space through intention and action." Nisha Madhan

== Awards ==
- Auckland Theatre Awards, 2017 – Best Live Art (shared with Julia Croft)
- Melbourne Fringe Festival Awards, 2017 – Discovery Award (shared with Julia Croft)
- Auckland Theatre Awards, 2018 – Community Spirit Award
- Edinburgh Festival Fringe, 2019 – Working On My Night Moves TOTAL theatre award (Director)
- Auckland Theatre Awards, 2020 – Working On My Night Moves Excellence Award for Overall Production (Director)
