= Rachael Rakena =

New Zealand artist

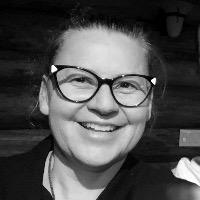
Rakena in 2019

Rachael Rakena (born 1969 in Wellington) is a New Zealand artist.

== Education ==
Rakena received a Diploma in Fine Arts at Otago Polytechnic in 1992 and in 1995 obtained a degree in Māori Studies. She completed a Post Graduate Diploma in Arts (Distinction) in 1996. She received a master's degree in 2003 with a dissertation titled Toi rerehiko which explored digital and electronic technologies from a Maori perspective.

== Career ==
Rakena draws inspiration from her family connections to Ngāi Tahu, Ngāpuhi and Pākehā ancestries. Rakena uses the term 'toi rerehiko' to describe her practice, meaning ‘art that employs electricity, movement and light’.

Rakena’s work is mainly collaborative. She has worked with the sculptor Brett Graham, the soundscape artist Keri Whaitiri, and dancers and choreographers such as Louise Potiki Bryant, Maaka Pepene, Justine Hohaia and Corinna Hunzika, all from the Atamira Dance Company.

While at the University of Otago, Rakena was involved in the community group Kai Tahu Whanau ki Araiteuru, which was committed to the revitalisation of Ngāi Tahu narrative, tikanga (cultural practices) and kawa (cultural protocols).CAG p76

Rakena has previously lectured in the School of Maori Visual Arts at Massey University and is currently a senior lecturer at Massey University’s School of Fine Arts.

== Major exhibitions ==
Rakena’s work has been included in exhibitions in New Zealand and internationally. In 2006 she represented New Zealand with Brett Graham at the Sydney Biennale; in 2007 their collaborative work Aniwaniwa was included at the collateral events at the Venice Biennale. Her work was also included in Pasifika Styles at Cambridge University, and in Dateline: Contemporary Art from the Pacific at Neuer Berliner Kunstverien.

- 2002 Mihi aroha in Whare exhibition, SOFA Gallery, Christchurch
- 2003 Water: Our space – a digital media installation exhibited at the Hocken Collections
- 2003 Rerehiko in Te Puawai o Ngai Tahu: 12 Contemporary Ngai Tahu Artists, Christchurch Art Gallery Te Puna o Waiwhetu
- 2004 Ahakoa he iti... – a collaborative work with soundscape artist Keri Whaitiri, commissioned by Art & Industry Biennial Trust for SCAPE 2004 Biennial in Christchurch
- 2004 Iwidotnz in He Rere Kee: Taking Flight Tinakori Gallery, Wellington
- 2005 Taonga Whanau – a collaborative exhibition with the artist, her father Otene Rakena, a pounamu carver, and her sister Hana Rakena, a ceramic artist, SOFA Gallery, Christchurch
- 2006 Aniwaniwa – a collaborative work with Brett Graham, Venice Biennale
- 2006 U.F.O.B – a collaborative work with Brett Graham for the 2006 Biennale of Sydney
- 2007 U.F.O.B – a collaborative work with Brett Graham, shown in Telecom Prospect:New Art New Zealand, City Gallery Wellington
- 2008 Dateline: Contemporary Art from the Pacific, Neuer Berliner Kunstverien, Germany
- 2008 World Histories, Des Moines Art Center, Iowa
- 2008 Aniwaniwa, City Gallery Wellington
- 2008 Dateline: Return, Govett-Brewster Art Gallery
- 2006–2008 Mo Tatou, Ngai Tahu Whanui exhibition Museum of New Zealand Te Papa Tongarewa
- 2008 Video Ground: Recent Moving Image Works from Australia and Aotearoa/New Zealand, a MAAP (Multimedia Art Asia Pacific touring program): Bangkok Experimental Film Festival and University of Chicago Film Studies Center
- 2011 Haka Peep Show, shown in Dunedin as part of the 2011 Rugby World Cup
- 2012 Contact: Artists from Aotearoa/New Zealand, Frankfurter Kunstverein, Germany

== Personal life ==
Rakena is of Māori (Ngāpuhi and Ngāi Tahu) descent.
