= Michele Hine =

New Zealand actor, director and educator (born 1956)

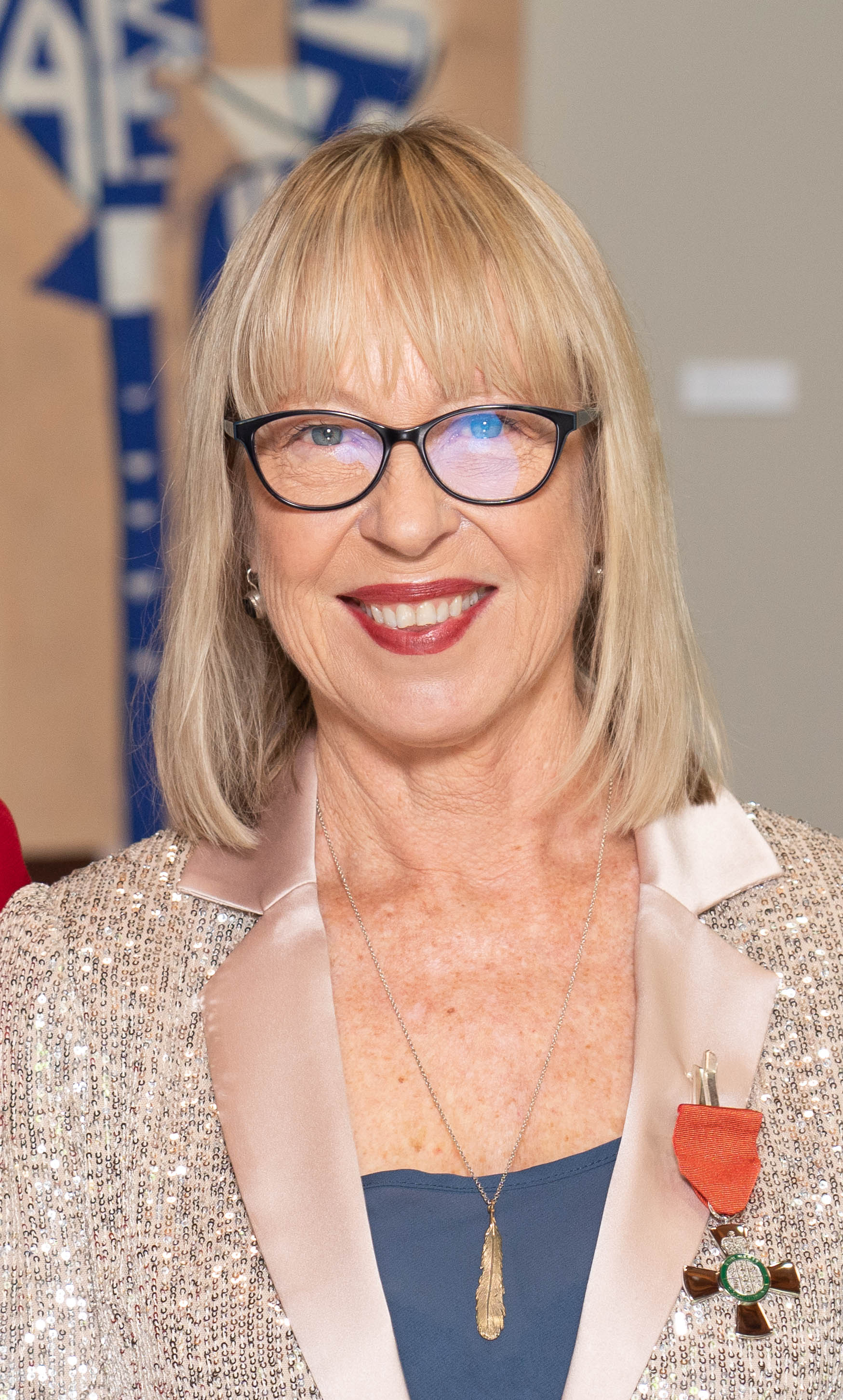
- Hine in 2021
- Born: 1956
- Awards: Member of the New Zealand Order of Merit

Academic work
- Institutions: Toi Whakaari, University of Auckland, Victoria University of Wellington, Unitec Institute of Technology

Michele Rae Hine MNZM (born 1956) is a New Zealand actor, director and performing arts educator. Hine has had roles in Disney's Return to Oz, disaster film Atomic Twister, New Zealand soap opera Shortland Street, and played Carol Duff in Go Girls. In 2021, Hine was appointed a Member of the New Zealand Order of Merit for services to performing arts education.

== Early life and education ==
Hine was born in 1956 and raised in Wellington, New Zealand. She is related to the Hine cognac family. She has a Master's degree in directing.

== Career ==
Hine first acted professionally at Wellington's Downstage Theatre in her teens. She spent seven years acting in the UK, Europe and Japan before returning to New Zealand in 1985.

Hine's roles include playing Wheeler in Disney films Return to Oz and Atomic Twister, TVNZ's Fresh Eggs, and a core cast role as Carol Duff on Go Girls.

Hine was co-founder of The Actors' Program, and is artistic manager. She was a lecturer in performing arts at Unitec Institute of Technology for seventeen years, where she established and led the performing arts programme. She has also taught at Toi Whakaari the New Zealand Drama School, and at both Victoria University of Wellington and the University of Auckland.

Hine was a Board member of the Basement Theatre from its founding in 2010 until 2017, and was chair for six years.

Her stage roles have included Bernada Alba in The House of Bernarda Alba at The Auckland Performing Arts Centre, Jude in The Idea of America, and a role in A Thousand Hills, a play based on the life of Rwanda refugee Francois Byamana. In 2016 she played a leading part alongside Annie Whittle in former student Jess Sayer's play Sham, written especially for Hine. The play featured in the Going West festival.

== Honours and awards ==
In the 2021 New Year Honours, Hine was appointed a Member of the New Zealand Order of Merit for services to performing arts education. In 1996 she was awarded an ASB Teaching Trust award, and in 2012 was awarded an Auckland Theatre Award for her performance in the play The Idea of America.
