= Going West =

Writers festival in New Zealand

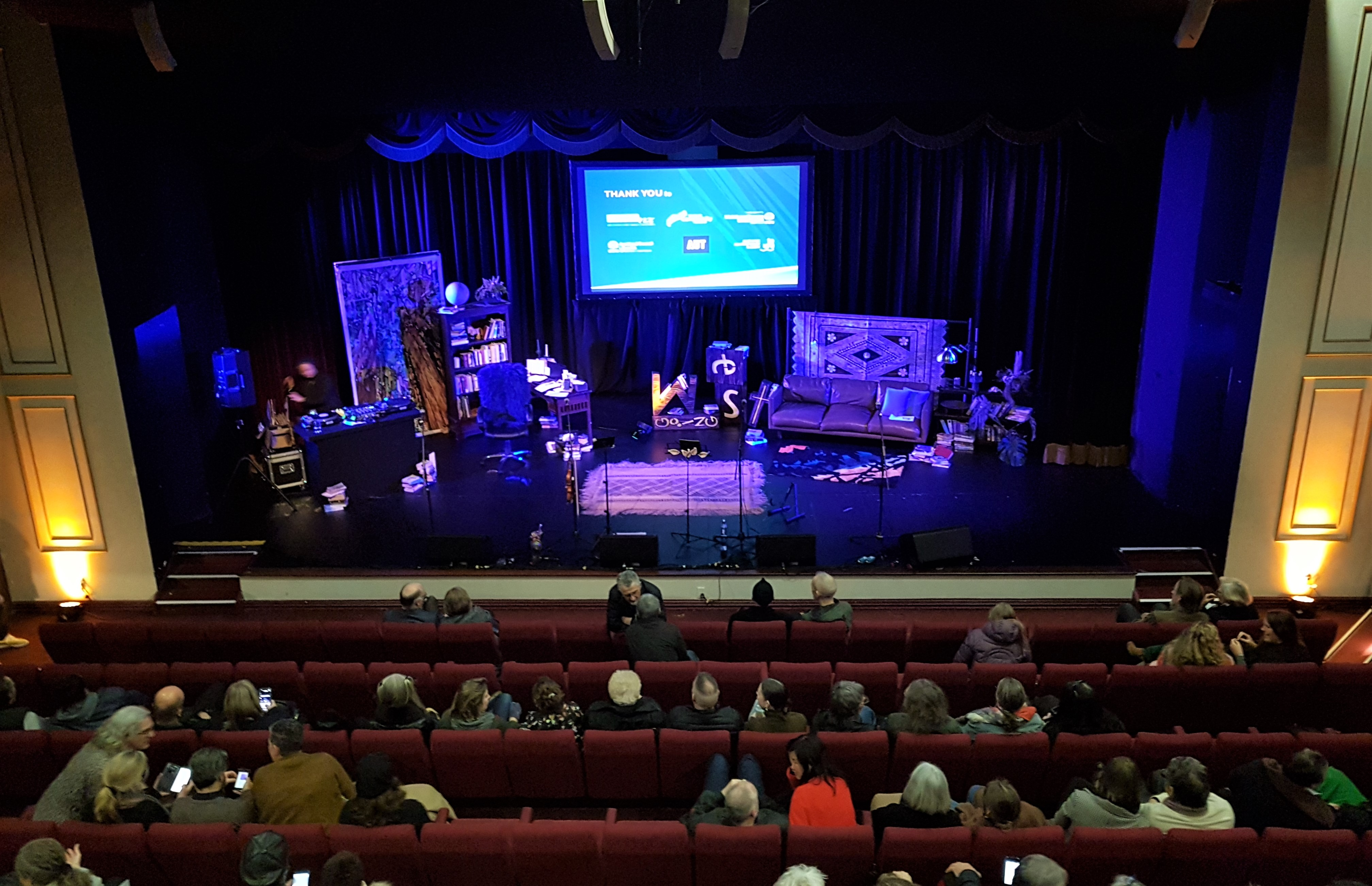
Going West at the Glen Eden Playhouse Theatre, 14 Aug 2021

The Going West Books & Writers Festival is a New Zealand literary festival which began in 1996 in West Auckland. It was Auckland's first literary festival, and is one of the longest-running literary festivals in New Zealand. Going West predominantly features New Zealand writers, poets, and orators, often with a West Auckland connection.

== Origin ==
Going West was founded by Naomi McCleary, arts manager for Waitakere City, and Murray Gray, owner of Parnell bookshop Under Silkwood, with the assistance of Bob Harvey, Mayor of Waitakere. Gray stepped down as programme director in 2015 after 20 years and was succeeded by Robyn Mason, now the archivist and curator; as of 2021 the director is James Littlewood.

The festival's name was inspired by a passage in Maurice Gee's 1992 novel Going West which describes a train journey from the western suburb of Henderson to central Auckland. In 1996 the organisers assembled friends to reenact the trip with a hired steam train, running poetry readings and events at train stations along the way. There were even readings on the train itself. The programme was put together by Murray Gray and Peter Simpson, and Gil Hanly and Marti Friedlander acted as photographers.

The inaugural Going West festival was held in a "freezing Corban Estate concrete warehouse" on 13–14 July 1996. The first words spoken were in Māori, by Ngahuia Te Awekotuku as part of the session "Breathing Words" with Robert Sullivan and Bernard Makoare, a recitation of Māori oral and written literature. It followed a performance on traditional Māori instruments (taonga pūoro) by Makoare. One panel featured Maurice Shadbolt, Dick Scott and Kevin Ireland; another comprised Debra Daley, Emily Perkins, and Stephanie Johnson. In 1997 Maurice Gee attended, and read from his book Going West at the Henderson Railway Station.

By its tenth year, the festival consisted of a three-day literary weekend at a single venue, Titirangi Memorial Hall, followed by an all-day trip on a steam train, hired for $15,500, to Helensville and back, stopping at five stations. The cost of the train was offset by sponsorship.

Eventually the Sunday train schedule changed and it became too difficult to book a private train. The festival is now held annually in a variety of Waitakere locations, including West Auckland's Civic Building, Lopdell House, Glen Eden Playhouse and Te Uru. Going West 2020 was cancelled due to COVID-19 and took place as a series of podcasts, but returned in 2021 in a new format with multimedia events and monthly live performances. Poets and filmmakers collaborated to make short films as part of a series called Different Out Loud.

Going West is one of the longest-running literary festivals in New Zealand. From the inaugural 1996 festival every session was recorded onto broadcast-quality tape by sound technician Dave Hodge, who worked with the festival for 24 years. In 2003, Waitakere City Libraries partnered with the Going West Festival Trust to support Dave Hodge in recording every session and preserve the Going West audio archive.

== Notable participants ==
- Sam Hunt (1996)
- Maurice Gee (1997, 2000)
- Maurice Shadbolt (1997)
- Hone Tuwhare (1999)
- Michael King (2001, 2003)
- Max Cryer (2002)
- C. K. Stead
- Fiona Kidman
- Sir Bob Harvey (2013)
- Rod Oram (2017)
- Paula Morris (2018)
- Bill Manhire
- Allen Curnow
- Selina Tusitala Marsh - New Zealand Poet Laureate (2017)
- Charlotte Grimshaw (2018)
- Elizabeth Knox (2019)
- Karlo Mila (2021)
- Daren Kamali (2021)
- Michele Hine (2016)
