= Sarah Foster-Sproull =

New Zealand choreographer, dancer and academic

- Citizenship: New Zealand
- Occupation(s): Dancer, choreographer and lecturer in dance studies

Sarah Foster-Sproull is a New Zealand choreographer, dancer and senior lecturer in dance studies at the University of Auckland.

== Early life and education ==
Foster-Sproull was born in Dunedin and attended Otago Girl's High School. She began dancing at age 6 being taught by Robyn Sinclair at the Dunedin School of Ballet. She went on to attend the New Zealand School of Dance and in 2017 gained a Masters in Dance Studies from the University of Auckland. Her masters thesis was entitled Embodied economies: Locating the ‘prosumer-dancer’ within dancers’ experiences of choreographic practice. As at 2021 Foster-Sproull is undertaking a doctorate in the dance studies programme at the University of Auckland.

== Performance and choreography ==
During her dancing career Foster-Sproull has performed with Soapbox Productions, the Douglas Wright Dance Company, and the Commotion Company amongst others. Foster-Sproull went on to become a founding member of The New Zealand Dance Company, performing as a dancer as well as choreographing works for that company. In 2008 she performed a role in Parmenter's Tent at the Tempo Dance Festival and was awarded best female performer. In 2015 Foster-Sproull was chosen as one of five choreographers to contribute to the Craft of Embodiment workshop in Canada and also had a residency at the T.H.E Second Company, a dance company in Singapore.

From 2017 to 2019 Foster-Sproull was the Creative New Zealand Choreographic Fellow. In 2018 Foster-Sproull was commissioned by Patricia Barker to choreograph a work to commemorate the 125th anniversary of women’s suffrage in New Zealand. For this commission, Foster-Sproull created Despite The Loss Of Small Detail, and it was this work that began her association with the Royal New Zealand Ballet. Foster-Sproull then went on to create the work Artemis Rising in 2019. This work was produced to honour Abigail Boyle, a Royal New Zealand Ballet Principal who was retiring. Artemis Rising was again performed by the Royal New Zealand Ballet in 2020. Her choreographic work Orchids (2019) produced by her company Foster Group Dance at Circa Theatre and Q Theatre received critical acclaim with an intergeneration group of women dancers; Marianne Schultz, Katie Burton, Rose Philpott, Jahra Wasasala, Joanne Hobern, Tori Manley- Tapu and Ivy Foster.

Also in 2019, Foster-Sproull was appointed the Director of Choreography for the 2019 World of Wearable Art performances.

As at 2021 she lives in Auckland and is the artistic director of the Foster Group Dance company as well as a senior lecturer in dance studies at the University of Auckland. She is also a choreographer in residence at the Royal New Zealand Ballet.

She says of creativity: "How you can make art and not think about it critically?"
