= Taiaroa Royal =

New Zealand dancer, artistic director and choreographer

- Education: New Zealand School of Dance
- Occupations: Dancer; choreographer
- Awards: Te Tohu Toi Kē a Te Waka Toi, Making a Difference in Contemporary Dance (2010) Te Waka Toi awards; Churchill Fellowship (2017); Arts Foundation of New Zealand Laureate Award (2023)

Taiaroa Royal CF is a New Zealand dancer and choreographer. Royal co-founded the contemporary Māori dance company Okareka with Taane Mete. As a dancer he has performed with New Zealand companies the Royal New Zealand Ballet, Douglas Wright Dance Company, Atamiria and Black Grace. He has choreographed contemporary dance and also music videos including for Evermore and Ardijah, and for the World of Wearable Art (WOW) in Wellington. He is a 2023 recipient of an Arts Foundation of New Zealand Laureate Award.

== Early life and education ==
Royal identifies with the iwi Te Arawa of the Rotorua and Bay of Plenty regions, Ngāti Raukawa, Uenukopako and Kāi Tahu of the South Island. As a teenager at age 15 he won a disco dancing competition in the Bay of Plenty.

Royal is a graduate of the New Zealand School of Dance, finishing in 1984.

== Career ==
Companies he has performed with as a dancer include the Royal New Zealand Ballet, Douglas Wright Dance Company, Human Garden, Commotion Dance Company, Atamiria Dance Company and Black Grace, and he has toured to England, Europe, Australia and America.

In 2007, he started the Ōkāreka Dance Company with Taane Mete. Ōkāreka's 2008 show Tama Ma, premiered at the Tempo Dance Festival, Auckland, won awards and went on to tour New Zealand. It had seasons at the Strut Festival, Perth in November 2010 and The Powerhouse, Brisbane in March 2011. Tama Ma had autobiographical elements and was danced by Royal and Taane Mete. It included choreography by Michael Parmenter and Douglas Wright.

He has choreographed operas for New Zealand Opera.

Some of his choreography is commercial such as music videos for Maree Sheehan, Evermore and Ardijah, and events such as Christmas in the Park in Auckland. For the World of Wearable Art event in Wellington he has choreographed the South Pacific section.

Royal has a teaching practice having taught at the New Zealand School of Dance and Unitec Institute of Technology on the Bachelor of Performing Screen Arts.

In the New Zealand Festival in 2020, he collaborated with the American dance company Exhale to produce a work called Hōkioi me te Vwōhali From Spirit Eagles Land.

== Awards ==
In 2008, Tama Ma, produced and danced by Royal and Taane Mete, won four Tempo Dance Festival awards including ‘Spirit of the Festival’, and was also voted ‘Best Dance’ by Metro Magazine's "Best In Auckland". In 2010, he was included in the Tempo Dance Festival's Honouring a Dancer evening. He received Te Tohu Toi Kē a Te Waka Toi, Making a Difference in Contemporary Dance, at the 2010 Te Waka Toi awards.

In 2017, Royal was awarded a Churchill Fellowship to travel to Cincinnati, to undertake choreographic research with Exhale Dance Tribe to start developing a united choreographic language and voice. In 2023, he received an Arts Foundation of New Zealand Laureate Award.
