= Motocade =

New Zealand rock band

- Origin: Auckland, New Zealand
- Genres: Rock
- Years active: 2003–present
- Members: Eden Mulholland; Scott Sutherland; Geordie McCallum; Will Mulholland

Motocade is a New Zealand Rock band formed in Auckland in 2003 by Eden Mulholland (singer/guitarist), Scott Sutherland (bass), Geordie McCallum (guitar/keyboards) and Will Mulholland (drums). In 2007 the music video for the single "My Friends" received high rotation on the New Zealand music channel C4 and Juice TV. In early 2008 the music video for the single "Soap Opera" was in rotation on C4. Motocade's song Octopus was featured in a Home and Away episode where Myles finds out about Roman's Afghanistan secret. Their song Oldest Trick in the Book has also been used in a Home and Away episode.

In March 2007 the EP "Into the Fall" reached number 9 on the IMNZ Album Chart.

In mid-2010, the band released the song "Holy Moly", which received frequent airplay on ZM and was used as the theme song for Hamish & Andy's Reministmas Special (2010) and Hamish and Andy's Caravan of Courage – Australia vs. New Zealand (2012).

== Debut album ==
Tightrope Highway is Motocade's debut studio album which was released on 20 April 2009. It was recorded at Roundhouse Studios and The Lab.

The group has not released any material since late 2010.

=== Track listing ===
1. Golden Light
2. Flying Saucer
3. Kissed in Time
4. Commandeering
5. She got deaf
6. My Friends
7. Tightrope Highway
8. Oldest Trick in the Book
9. Comeback Kid
10. Octopus
11. Jekyll And Hyde

=== Personnel ===
- Eden Mulholland – Guitar/Vocals
- Geordie McCallum – Guitar
- Scott Sutherland – Bass
- Will Mulholland – Drums/Vocals

== Discography ==
=== Studio albums ===
Date	Title
2009	Tightrope Highway: Released: 20 April; Label: Universal Music; Formats: CD, digital download

=== Extended plays ===
Date	Title	Label
2005	Motocade	Independent
2007	Into the Fall	Independent

=== Singles ===
Year	Title	NZ chart peak	Album
2009	"Oldest Trick in the Book"	—	Tightrope Highway
2010	"Holy Moly"	40	Tightrope Highway
"—" denotes release that did not chart.
