= Cat Ruka =

New Zealand choreographer and artistic director

Cat Ruka (born 1983) is a New Zealand dancer, choreographer, performance director and arts manager.

== Biography ==
Ruka is the daughter of Raureti and Vida Ruka, and spent her early life at her mother's home in Warkworth and her father's Hokianga marae. She affiliates to the Ngāpuhi and Waitaha iwi.

Ruka completed a bachelor's degree, a post-graduate diploma and a master's degree in dance studies at the University of Auckland, New Zealand. She lectured in performing arts at Manukau Institute of Technology for 10 years, and was artistic director of Tempo Dance Festival in 2020.

In 2018 Ruka along with Carrie Rae Cunningham mentored FRESH, an emerging dance programme in the Tempo Dance Festival.

In 2020, Ruka was appointed executive director of the Basement Theatre in Auckland.

== Creative works and appearances ==
Playing Savage choreographed and performed by Cat Ruka was presented in the 2010 Kōwhiti Festival of Māori Contemporary Dance at Soundings Theatre, Te Papa, Wellington.

Ruka choreographed the Manukau Institute of Technology's first production in 2011, a South Auckland version of West Side Story.

Created and performed in 2011 by Ruka and dancer and performance artist Josh Rutter NEW TREATY MILITIA is a production developed in Berlin, Germany as part of the Matchpoint Choreographer Meeting, a 7 day event curated by Jochen Roller and Anna Wagner. NEW TREATY MILITIA premiered at the Hebbel am Ufer performance centre in Berlin, and then toured to: Boutique Studios, Brooklyn New York; Tempo Dance Festival, Q Theatre; Southside Arts Festival, Ōtara; a secret venue in Dunedin in a double-bill with Warwick Broadhead; and The Long Hall, Roseneath, Wellington. It explored contentious issues about the Treaty of Waitangi.

At the Maidment Theatre, Auckland in 2012 Ruka performed an experimental solo work along in a double-bill along with Tru Paraha called HINE-2012, this was a forum with discussion after the performances and described as: "Indigenous choreographers frame the body as a site for investigation and present their works in an evening of dynamic theatre."

In 2017 Ruka directed Neon Bootleg created by Moe Laga-Fa'aofo and produced by FAFSWAG at Basement Theatre.

Ruka created a dance film installation zodiac as part of Embodied contemplation: A mixed bill at the Basement Theatre in 2019.

In 2019 Ruka was the keynote speaker at the Tiny Performance Festival in Christchurch where she talked of 'performance as medicine'.
