= Kura Te Ua =

Māori dancer and choreographer

Kura Te Ua is a Māori performing arts practitioner, choreographer and artistic director. She specialises in kapa haka and has developed the new hybrid-form 'haka theatre'. Her company Hawaiki TŪ creates haka theatre events including in 2023 where Autaia is featuring 400 student performers.

== Biography ==
Te Ua was born in Auckland and raised in a community of Black Power gang members in the suburbs of Glen Innes and Ōtāhuhu. Te Ua is of Te Rarawa, Te Aupōuri, Te Aitanga a Māhaki, Te Whakatōhea and Tūhoe descent. As a teenager she joined Pounamu Huia, a performing arts training school and group.

She completed a Bachelor of Arts degree in performing arts from the University of Auckland. In 2011 she co-founded a Māori contemporary dance and performance company, Hawaiki TŪ. In 2023 she is studying towards a PhD with Te Wharewānanga o Awanuiārangi.

Te Ua is developing a new style of performance called haka theatre, drawn from traditional dance theatre and Māori performing arts. Haka theatre was first named in 2011 on a show Arohanui - The Greatest Love created by Tanemahuta Gray, Tapeta Wehi, Annette Wehi, Jim Moriarty and Helen Pearse-Otene. Te Ua was a performer in this show.

In June 2023 a big haka theatre event Autaia is presented at the Kiri Te Kanawa Theatre featuring 400 students from six schools, Te Kura Kaupapa Māori o Te Kotuku, Ngā Puna o Waiōrea, Te Kura Kaupapa Māori o Hoani Waititi Marae, Auckland Girls Grammar (Kahurangi ki Maungawhau), Manurewa High School and James Cook High School (Te Pūkenga). Each school performs for 15-minutes. Te Ua is the creative director of Aitaia and it is co-produced with her company Hawaiki TŪ and Auckland Live. It is the third year for this event to be held.

Autaia means “to be extraordinary” and this kaupapa encourages every single person involved to step into the world of haka theatre because on the other side awaits a pathway of passion, pride and unwavering self belief.’ (Kura Te Ua 2023)

== Performances ==
- Te Matatini with Te Waka Huia (2002) Takaparawhau - performer.
- Taurite (2022), Q Theatre, Auckland. A large-scale haka dance theatre performance - artistic director. Produced by Hawaiki TŪ.
- M9, He toi whakairo, he mana tangata - without Māori art, who are we? (6 Jul 2023), Kiri Te Kanawa Theatre, Aotea Centre, Auckland. Presenting alongside Stacey Morrison (MC), Matai Smith, Troy Kingi, Cilla Ruha, Rawiri Waititi, Dr Kiri Tamihere, Peata Melbourne and Bailey Mackey.
- Te Matatini with Te Waka Huia (2023), Auckland - performer.
- Kōpū, directed by Amber Cureen, Te Pou Theatre (2023) - choreographer. Originally commissioned by Auckland Arts Festival, the 2023 premiere produced in partnership with Te Rēhia Theatre Company.

== Awards and recognition ==
In 2013, Te Ua received the Tup Lang Choreographic Award from Creative New Zealand.
