= Jahra Wasasala =

New Zealand artist

- Born: Auckland, New Zealand
- Known for: Dance, Choreography, Poetry

Jahra Wasasala is a cross-disciplinary artist. Primarily, she is a contemporary dancer, choreographer and poet. Wasasala was included in the triennial Aotearoa Contemporary Exhibition at the Auckland Art Gallery in 2024.

== Background and practice ==
Wasasala was born and raised in Aotearoa, New Zealand and grew up in West Auckland. She is of Fijian and European descent. Wasasala incorporates various dance traditions into their practice, including Krump, FlexN, Japanese Butoh, and Fijian Meke.

=== CONJAH ===
Wasasala is part of the collaborative group CONJAH, alongside performance artist Ooshcon. This performance and facilitation focused partnership produces solo and ensemble works, as well as dance festivals.

== Awards ==
In 2016, Wasasala received the Prime Minister's Pacific Youth Award under the Creative NZ Arts and Creativity Award category. In 2022, she was awarded the Arts Foundation Tumu Toi Springboard Award alongside Ooshcon, as part of their collaboration as CONJAH.
