= Mary Jane O'Reilly =

New Zealand dancer and choreographer

Mary Jane O'Reilly QSM (born 23 July 1950) is a New Zealand dancer and choreographer. She is best known for co-founding the Limbs Dance Company and the Auckland Dance Company, and choreographing the opening ceremony for the 1990 Commonwealth Games and the millennium dawn celebrations at Gisborne.

== Career ==
During her career, O'Reilly has held positions including:

- Artistic director, Limbs Dance Company (1977–1989)
- Director of choreography, Commonwealth Games, Auckland (1989–1990)
- Advisor to QEII Arts Council (1991–1992)
- Artistic director, Auckland Dance Company (1996–2001)
- Governor, Arts Foundation of New Zealand (1999–2004)
- Senior lecturer in dance at the University of Auckland (2001–2004)
- Artistic director, TEMPO Festival of Dance (2006–2011)
- Artistic director, Living Room Festival (2012)

Her students have included Mark Baldwin and Douglas Wright.

== Honours and awards ==
In 1984, O'Reilly received the Allen Highet Award for outstanding achievement by a mid-career artist. In the 1990 Queen's Birthday Honours, she received the Queens Service Medal for public services.
