= Jochen Roller =

German choreographer

Jochen Roller (born 1971) is a German choreographer and performance artist.

== Life ==
Born in Berlin, Roller studied applied theatre studies at the Justus Liebig University in Gießen and choreography at the Rudolf von Laban centre in London. He has been working as a freelance choreographer since 1997. He has created over 40 productions in the fields of contemporary dance, performance, theatre and film. Roller became known with the three-hour solo trilogy "perform performing" about the precarious working conditions of artists. His productions tour worldwide and were invited to the German Dance Platforms in 2004 and 2006.

From 2007 to 2010, Roller curated the dance programme at Hamburg's Kampnagel fabrik.

He has worked as a guest lecturer at various universities, including the Freie Universität Berlin, the Hochschule für Musik und Tanz Köln, the Universität Hamburg, the Conservatorio El Barco San José and the LaSalle College in Singapore.

== Aesthetics ==
Roller's choreographic work is characterised by minimalist rigour and sharply formulated content. His productions often have explicit socio-political themes. Roller's choreographic approach is classified as "concept dance".

== Works ==
The following is a list of Roller's most important productions:

- 2009 Basically I don't but actually I do.
- 2008 JANCLOD! - être aware and beyond.
- 2005 mnemonic nonstop.
- 2004 mindgarden.
- 2002 perform performing.
