= Julia Croft =

New Zealand performance artist

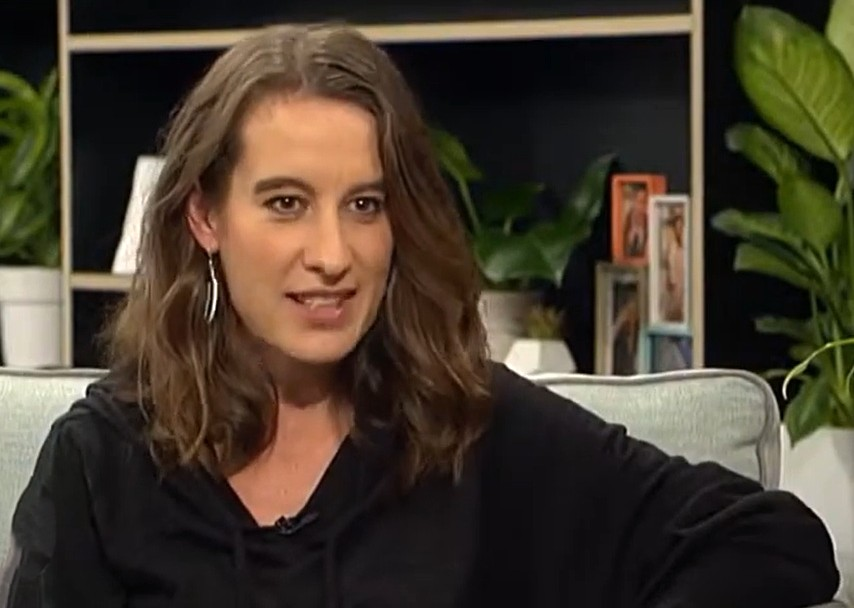
Croft in 2017

Julia Croft is a New Zealand performance artist.

== Biography ==
Croft grew up in Christchurch, New Zealand and graduated from Toi Whakaari: New Zealand Drama School in 2008 with a Bachelor of Performing Arts (Acting). She also completed a bachelor's degree in English and theatre at the University of Canterbury. Croft has also trained at L’Ecole Philippe Gaullier in Paris, France.

In 2017 she and Nisha Madhan co-created a live art act called Power Ballad, which won Best Performer and Best Live Art at the Auckland Fringe Festival and the Discovery Award at the Melbourne Fringe Festival.
