= The Basement Theatre =

New Zealand theatre

Coordinates: 36.85363°S 174.76282°E

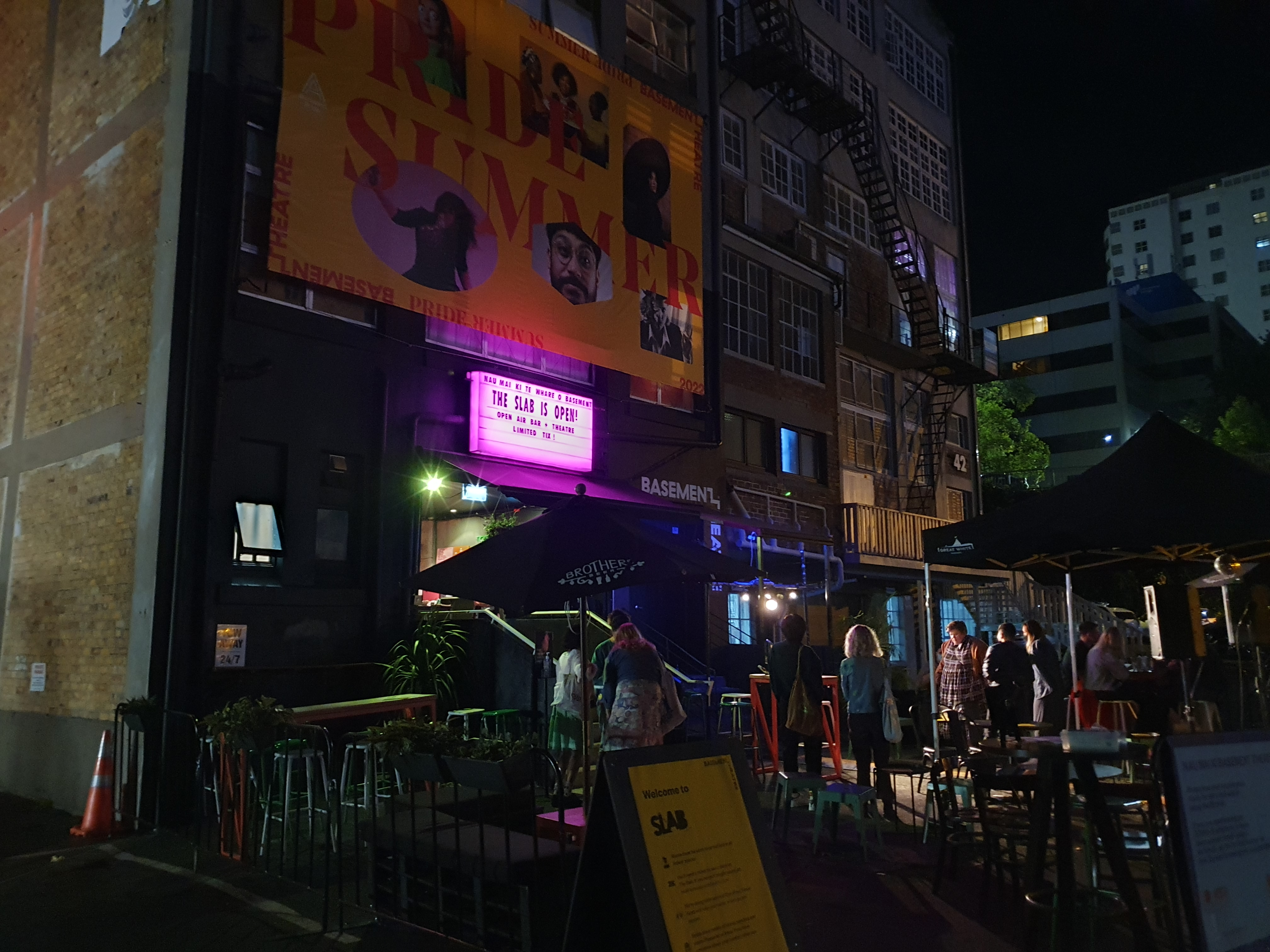
Basement Theatre, Auckland, New Zealand - at night

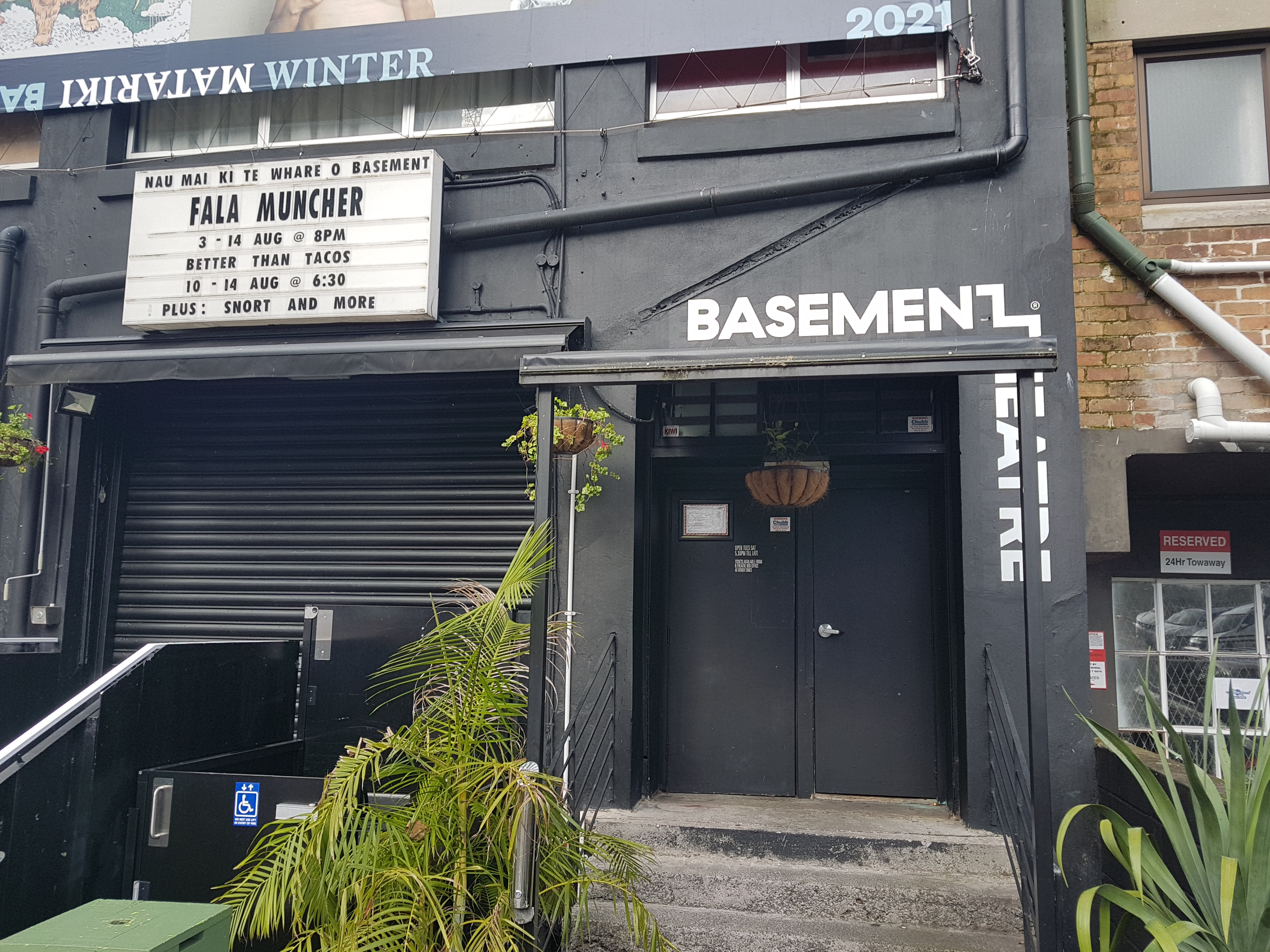
The Basement Theatre, Auckland, New Zealand

The Basement Theatre is an Auckland theatre founded by Charlie McDermott in 2008. The theatre focuses on providing a venue for young people in the performing arts to enter the industry. Their priorities are making theatre accessible for both those who work in the industry and audience members.

The building was previously occupied by Silo Theatre which vacated the premises in 2007. Charlie McDermott, Michelle Blundell, and Morgana O'Reilly were employed as bartenders at the time and raised funds over the summer to take over the space.

The theatre saw the debut of actors who have since rose to prominence including Rose Matafeo and Tom Sainsbury. They are funded by Creative New Zealand, Foundation North and Auckland City Council. In 2018 they had hosted over 600 shows.

In 2020, The Basement Theatre was forced to close for around 6 months because of COVID-19 restrictions, but at the end of the year they were able to stage a Christmas show, Le Basement XXXmas Cabaret.

Current staffing includes Cat Ruka (Executive Director), Nisha Madhan (Programmer), and Trigg (Technical & Facilities Manager). Actor and director Michele Hine was a founding Board member, and chair for six years.
