= Limbs Dance Company =

New Zealand dance troupe

The Limbs Dance Company was formed in Auckland, New Zealand in May 1977 and disbanded in Wellington in September 1989. Limbs was "the first contemporary dance company in New Zealand to win a general following", and performed alongside notable New Zealand acts such as Split Enz.

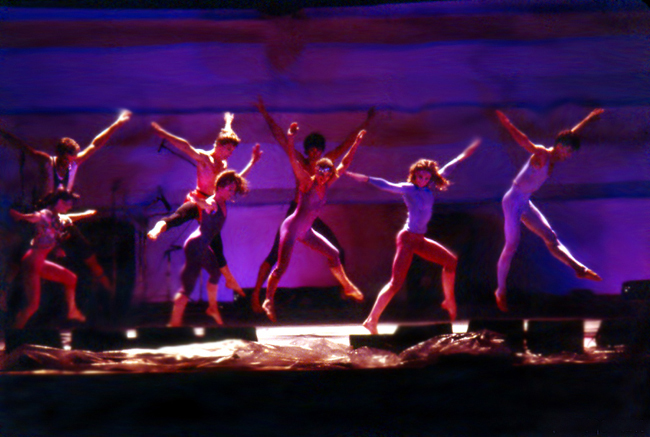
Limbs Dance Company in 1981 at a Nambassa festival in Waihi.

Choreographers included Mary Jane O'Reilly, Chris Jannides, Mark Baldwin, Douglas Wright, Marianne Schultz and Shona McCullagh. Dorothea Ashbridge was the resident ballet mistress.

Music for the dances included those by Coconut Rough, Split Enz, Schtung, the Topp Twins, Jack Body, Chris Cree Brown, Don McGlashan, Philip Dadson, Wayne Laird, Jan Preston and Ivan Zagni.

When the company closed, their records were taken to Auckland City Library.

In September 2017, 40 years since the founding, Marianne Schultz released a comprehensive history of the group entitled Limbs Dance Company: Dance for All People, 1977-1989.
