= Bianca Hyslop =

Māori dancer and choreographer in New Zealand

Bianca Hyslop is a New Zealand Māori dancer and choreographer. She is affiliated with the Te Arawa and Ngāti Whakaue iwi.

== Biography ==
Hyslop completed a Bachelor of Performing Screen and Arts degree at Unitec Institute of Technology in 2009. She became a freelance dancer and joined Atamira Dance Company.

In 2016, Hyslop was the inaugural recipient of Dance Aotearoa New Zealand's Māori Choreolab, where she was paired with mentor Merenia Gray. Also in 2016, Hyslop created a choreographic work called A Murmuration for The New Zealand Dance Company as part of their Emerging Choreographers programme. In 2019, she worked with Rosie Tapsell of Ngāti Whakaue and artist Rowan Pierce to co-create a dance piece, Pōhutu. This work was included in the 2019 Tempo Dance Festival and the 2019 Kia Mau Festival at the Hannah Playhouse. At the 2021 Kia Mau Festival Hyslop, Pierce along with Tūī Matira Ranapiri Ransfield mounted an installation called Te Mauri o Pōhutu at the gallery in the Toi Pōneke Arts Centre.
