= Susan Jordan =

New Zealand choreographer, educator and artistic director

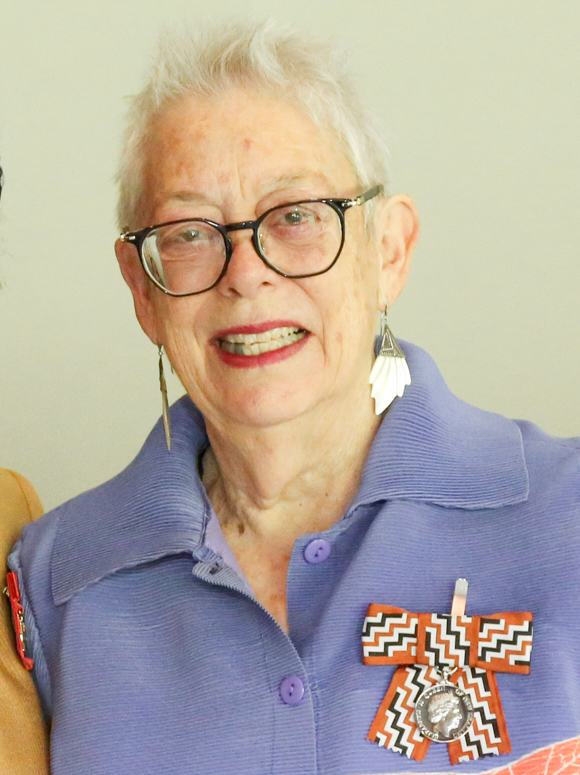
Jordan in 2024

Susan Gay Stevens Jordan QSM (born 1947) is a New Zealand dancer, choreographer and dance instructor.

== Biography ==
Jordan began dancing at the age of 7, and danced professionally with the New Zealand Ballet Company from the age of 17. She briefly gave up dancing to study typing and shorthand at a business school, and then theology with the aim of becoming a missionary, however she returned to dancing.

Jordan considered studying ballet in England or Australia but instead completed a Master of Arts degree in dance in Washington, D.C in the United States, where she was exposed to the teachings of Martha Graham. On her return to New Zealand she established the dance studies programme at the University of Auckland and taught the Graham technique. In 1976, she founded a modern dance company in Auckland called Movement Theatre.

Jordan established her own dance company, Jordan & Present Co, and during the 1980s and 1990s choreographed works for Creative New Zealand and its predecessor the Queen Elizabeth II Arts Council, as well as privately commissioned pieces. In 1993 she was commissioned to create a piece to commemorate the centenary of women's suffrage in New Zealand. Her choreography has been described as postmodern, aiming to create new relationships between performers and their audience.

In 2011 Jordan established a dance programme for senior citizens, originally named Dance Mobility and later re-branded as SeniorDANCE, to encourage seniors to keep active. The programme teaches older people to dance and aims to build balance and co-ordination, and has been recognised by the New Zealand Accident Compensation Corporation as an initiative that can help prevent falls in older adults.

In 2018 Jordan received funding from Creative New Zealand to complete a research project on creative ageing.

Jordan is president of the Northern Dance Network, a charitable organisation that creates 'pathways and opportunities for dance and dancers' formed in 1992, and established the Tempo Dance Festival in 2003.

== Awards and honours ==
In the 2024 New Year Honours, Jordan was awarded a Queen's Service Medal, for services to seniors and dance.
