= Delgirl =

Delgirl are an acoustic band from Dunedin, New Zealand, who play original music which is a mix of skiffle/folk/country/blues and Pacific styles. Original members, Deirdre Newall, Erin Morton and Lynn Vare formed the band in 2000. Newall retired in 2010 and John Dodd joined Vare and Morton on double bass.

== Members ==
- Erin Morton on guitar/trumpet/ukulele/vocals (2000– )
- Lynn Vare on percussion/snare drum/tenor ukulele/banjo/vocals (2000–)
- John Dodd on double bass/vocals (2010–)
- Deirdre Newall on double bass/bodhran/vocals (2000–2010)

== Career ==
One of the early venues Delgirl played at was the Wunderbar in Lyttelton, Christchurch, where they recorded the EP Live at the Wunderbar on 23 September 2006 with The Spencerville Project. It was recorded by John Kelcher who was previously a member of Dunedin band Sneaky Feelings.

Their debut album two, maybe three, days ride won the 2008 RIANZ "Tui" New Zealand Folk Album of the Year. The album was recorded at Vidmark Studios in Dunedin over the course of four days in November 2006. It was recorded by Tom Young who collaborated with the band on some of the tracks, with further mixing and mastering by Dale Cotton at Audioworkshop. The band went on to record a split CD in 2009 with Tom as his musician alias Freddy Fudd Pucker.

Their second album, Porchlight, was recorded by Ross McNab at Sweetway Studios, Owaka in mid-2009. The album was produced by Nick Bollinger, well-known author, music critic and musician with the Windy City Strugglers. Porchlight reached 9th position on the IMNZ Top Twenty Independent Charts in the week of its release. Newall retired from the band in August 2010. John Dodd joined Vare and Morton playing double bass and contributing vocals. Dodd has played in numerous bands including Cripple, The Spaghettis, the Midge Marsden band, and is currently a member of The Chaps and the Whirling Eddys.

In November 2010 the new trio recorded a 4 track EP called 'Freaky Pea, which was released in March 2011. 'Freaky Pea' was recorded and mixed by John Egenes at the 'Albany Street Studios' in Dunedin, and mastered by Dale Cotton.
