= Shona McCullagh =

New Zealand choreographer, dancer and artistic director

Shona McCullagh MNZM
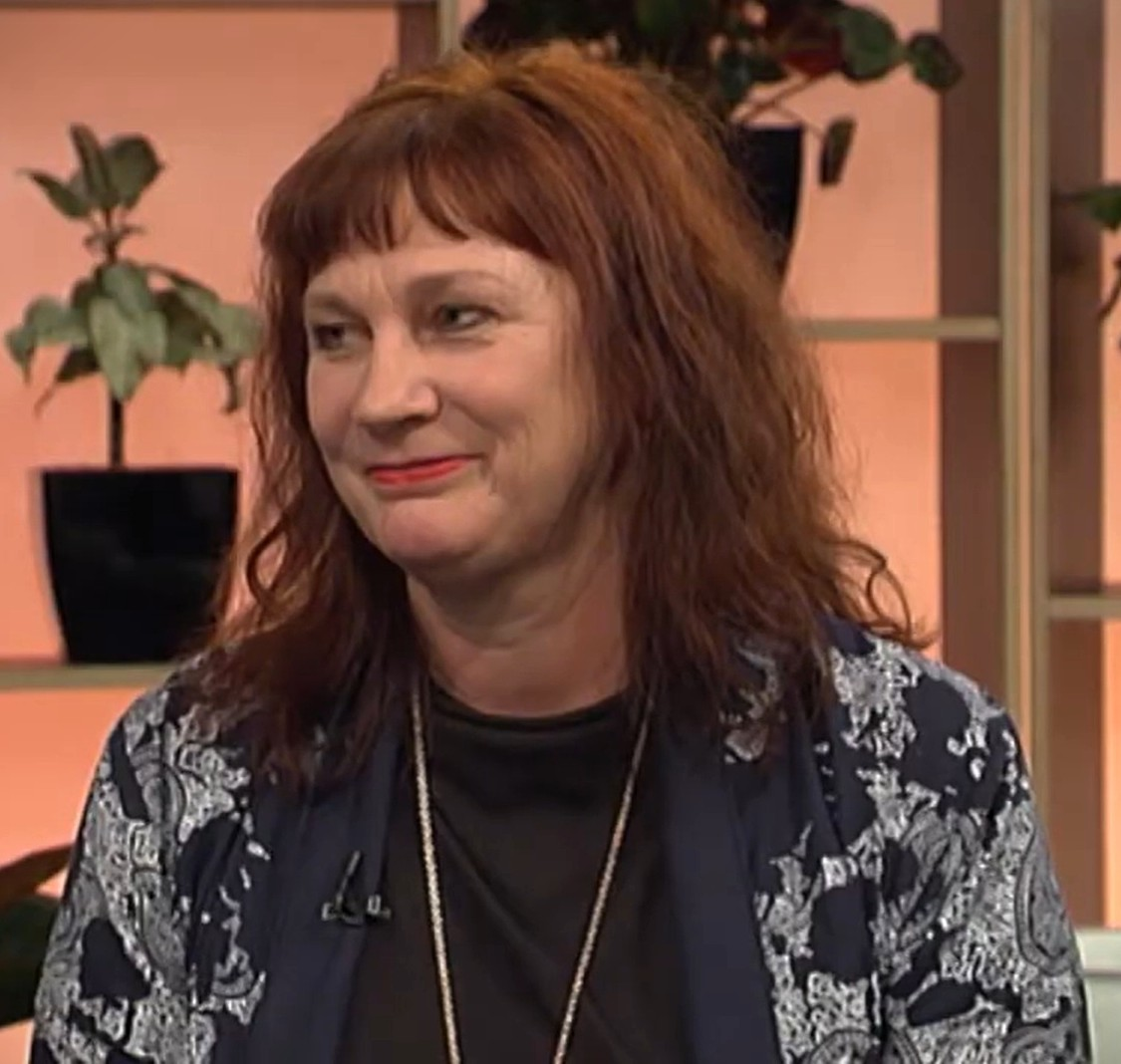
- McCullagh in 2017
- Occupations: Dancer, choreographer, artistic director
- Years active: 1984–
- Dancing career
- Current group: Auckland Festival
- Former groups: Limbs Dance Company, Douglas Wright Dance Company

Shona Margaret McCullagh MNZM is a New Zealand choreographer, dancer, filmmaker and artistic director. McCullagh was the founding director of the New Zealand Dance Company and was appointed artistic director of the Auckland Festival in 2019.

== Biography ==
Born in 1962 in Hamilton, McCullagh moved to Wellington when she was four and attended Northland School, and Wellington Girls' College from 1975 to 1979. McCullagh trained as a dancer at the New Zealand School of Dance, graduating in 1983 with a Special Award in Choreography. In 1984 McCullagh joined the Sydney company Darc Swan. McCullagh then became a rehearsal director, choreographer and dancer in Limbs Dance Company from 1985 to 1988. She was a founding member of the Douglas Wright Dance Company. Prior to that she toured New York performing with Douglas Wright & Dancers (1987). Companies that McCullagh has choreographed for include Footnote Dance, Douglas Wright Dance Company, The Royal New Zealand Ballet and her own company The Human Garden.

McCullagh has choreographed for theatre including collaborations with Nightsong Productions, The Watershed Theatre, the NZ Actors Company and Auckland Theatre Company. In addition McCullagh has both choreographed for screen and directed dance films. As a choreographer she has worked on television series Xena – Warrior Princess, Hercules, Spartacus and Legend of the Seeker and feature films Lord of the Rings and King Kong.

McCullagh will be the artistic director for the Auckland Festival, leading from 2021 until 2024, replacing the outgoing director Jonathan Bielski.

== Honours and awards ==
- Best Dancer (1988) Metro magazine
- 1999 North & South Magazine New Zealander of the Year
- Member of the New Zealand Order of Merit, for services to dance, in the 2000 Queen's Birthday Honours
- NZ Arts Foundation Laureate (2002)
- Winner, Arts category, Westpac/Fairfax New Zealand Woman of Influence Award (2014)
- Hynds Creative Entrepreneur of the Year (2015)
