= Taane Mete =

New Zealand dancer, choreographer, yoga teacher

Taane Mete is a New Zealand dancer, choreographer and yoga teacher.

== Early life and education ==
Mete affiliates with Ngāti Kahungunu and Ngāti Koroki-Kahukura. He graduated with honours from the New Zealand School of Dance in 1988. In 2008 he completed the Leadership New Zealand Programme, Pūmanawa Kaiārahi o Aotearoa.

== Work ==
Mete is a dancer, choreographer and yoga teacher, and was a founding member of Black Grace Dance Company. He has danced with Footnote Dance Company, the Douglas Wright Dance Company, Taiao Dance Company, and Fusion Dance Theatre, and the Atamira Dance Company, among others. Mete formed the Okareka Dance Company in 2007 with Taiaroa Royal.

Mete has taught at UNITEC New Zealand and the New Zealand School of Dance.

Mete featured in Shona McCullagh's short film Hurtle, and Peter Jackson's King Kong, and has appeared as a presenter for the television programme Takataapui.
