= Mark Baldwin (choreographer) =

New Zealand choreographer

Mark Phillip Baldwin OBE is a contemporary dance choreographer. He was born in Fiji and raised and educated in New Zealand. He was the Artistic Director of Rambert dance company from 2002–2018.

== Career ==
Baldwin studied fine arts at the University of Auckland and trained with the New Zealand Dance Centre before joining the Royal New Zealand Ballet. He was also one of the founding members of the Limbs Dance Company. He joined Rambert Ballet Company in 1980 and remained with the company for 10 years. He was the Resident Choreographer at Sadler's Wells, London, where he established the Mark Baldwin Dance Company (1993–2001). He created over 40 works for his new company and other major dance companies including: The Royal Ballet, Royal New Zealand Ballet, Berlin State Opera House, Phoenix Dance Theatre, Scottish Ballet, London City Ballet and Rambert Dance Company. He was Resident Choreographer for Scottish Ballet in 1996.

In December 2002, Baldwin returned to Rambert as Artistic Director and since then the company has won several awards including the Laurence Olivier Award for Outstanding Achievement in Dance in 2010 in recognition of the previous years' repertoire, and in 2011, the Critics' Circle National Dance Award 2010 for Outstanding Company.

Baldwin's first work for Rambert as Artistic Director was Constant Speed in 2005. Since then he has created Eternal Light and The Comedy of Change. In 2006 he choreographed The Wedding for the Royal New Zealand Ballet, and collaborated with Amanda Eyles to restage Andrée Howard's 1939 work Lady into Fox.

As part of the 90th anniversary celebrations of Rambert, Baldwin took part in the Rambert Archive's oral history project.

== Awards ==
Baldwin has received numerous awards throughout his career, including:

- Bonnie Bird Choreographic Award (1992)
- Time Out Award for Dance (1995)
- South Bank Show Award (2001) for The Bird Sings With Its Fingers
- French Grand Prix Award for Film (1996) for Echo
- Dance Artist Fellowship for Outstanding Contribution to Dance (2002)

He won the TMA Theatre Award for Achievement in Dance for Constant Speed and an Oliver Award for his restaging of Michael Clark's Swamp.

Baldwin was appointed Officer of the Order of the British Empire "for Services to Dance" in the 2015 Birthday Honours.
