= Michael Parmenter =

New Zealand choreographer and dancer

Michael Earl Parmenter MNZM (born 1954) is a New Zealand choreographer, teacher and dancer of contemporary dance.

== Career ==
Parmenter studied dance in the 1980s in New York and was influenced by both New York-based choreographer Erick Hawkins and Japanese Butoh master Min Tanaka. He has a master's degree in creative and performance dance from the University of Auckland. He formed the dance company Commotion in 1990 with notable works including the dance opera Jerusalem.

Recent work includes dance opera OrphEus which premiered at the 2018 Auckland Arts Festival. Parmenter talks about being gay and living with HIV in a TV documentary about him and in his autobiographical solo performance A Long Undressing. He has taught at the New Zealand School of Dance and UNITEC. He has choreographed for Footnote Dance Company, the Royal New Zealand Ballet and the New Zealand Dance Company amongst others.

Reporter Simon Wilson recounting a significant moment in the arts for him about a Parmenter performance:

I remember Parmenter telling his life story, the boy from Southland, born in the 1950s, gay in a conservative Christian family, how he got from there to dance, and then to a show based not on choreography but on words, although there was some very lovely dance in it too. That was A Long Undressing.

In the 1998 Queen's Birthday Honours, Parmenter was appointed a Member of the New Zealand Order of Merit, for services to the performing arts, and he received an Arts Foundation Laureate Award in 2010.

In 2022 Parmenter spent six months in Dunedin as the Caroline Plummer Dance Fellow at the University of Otago, during which he established a Balfolk group in the city.
