= Auckland Arts Festival =

Annual arts festival in New Zealand

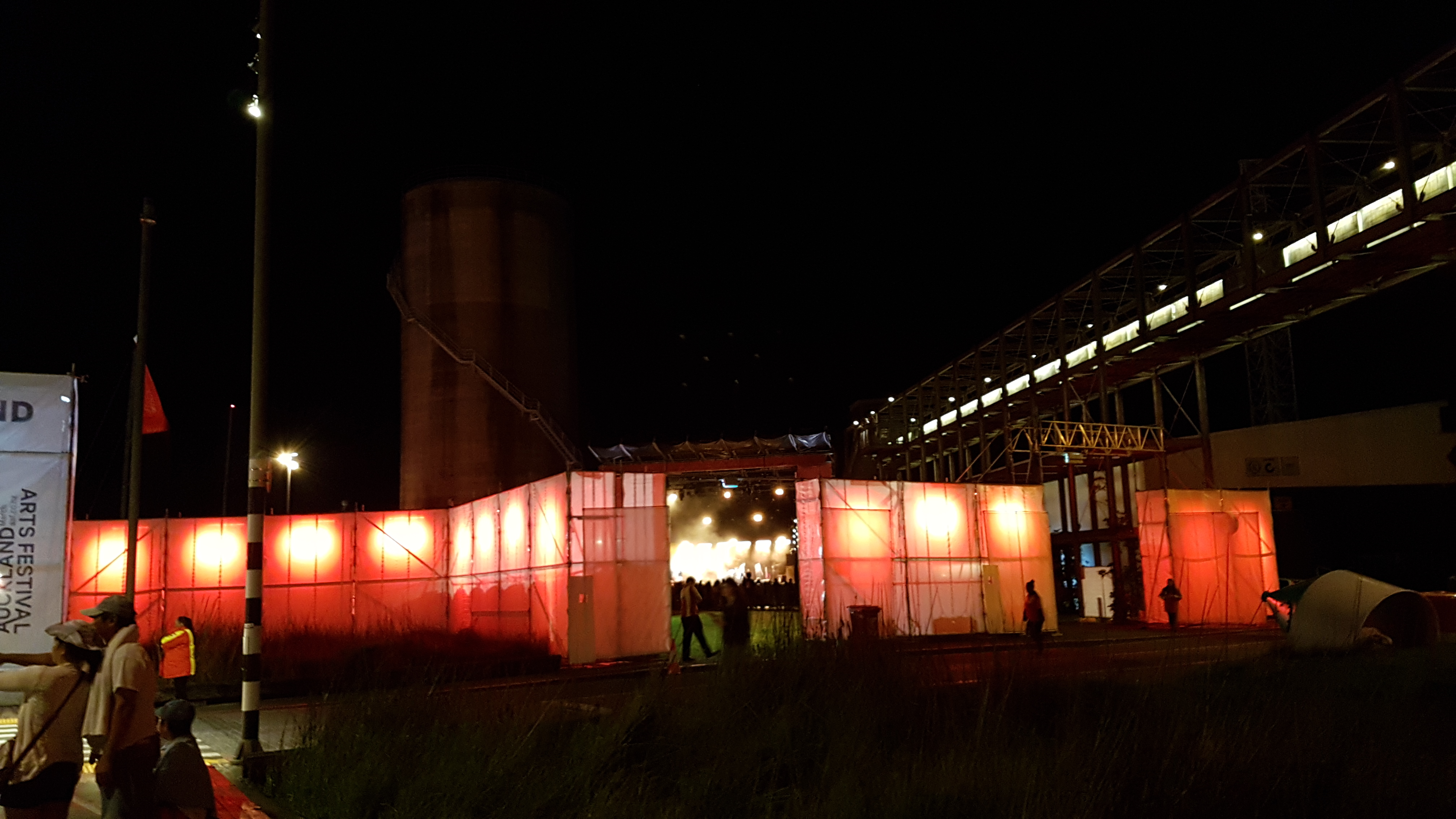
Auckland Arts Festival venue at Silo Park on the waterfront in 2018

Formerly known as Auckland Festival, Auckland Arts Festival or Te Ahurei Toi o Tāmaki Makaurau is an annual arts and cultural festival held in Auckland, New Zealand. The Festival features works from New Zealand, the Pacific, Asia and beyond, including world premieres of new works and international performing arts events.

== History ==
The first Auckland Festival of the Arts was held in 1953, after four annual music festivals were held from 1949 to 1952. A bigger festival was planned due to the coronation of Queen Elizabeth II. The festival continued annually until the 1980s and the last one was held in 1982. In September 2003 the inaugural event of the "new" Auckland Festival took place. Subsequently, the dates were moved to March and festivals were held in 2005, 2007, 2009, 2011, 2013, and 2015 before becoming annual in March 2016. In 2020 most of the festival's shows had to be cancelled as a result of the COVID-19 pandemic. However, four concerts by the Auckland Philharmonia Orchestra were streamed live online.

The 13th Auckland Arts Festival took place from 3 to 21 March 2021, although some events had to be cancelled as a result of Auckland entering into a lockdown in late February. Shona McCullagh became the artistic director from 2021 onwards, taking over from Jonathan Bielski.

The Festival is run by an independent not-for-profit trust, the Auckland Festival Trust. It is principally funded by Auckland City Council.

== Programme ==
The festival's main objectives are to engage Aucklanders in the arts, to support New Zealand art and artists, and to reflect what is unique about Auckland. Its program features many events including dance, music, cabaret, burlesque, theatre, ballet, visual arts, film, and public forums, occupying most of Auckland's theatres, galleries and concert halls.

The festival programme features international acts and the Auckland Festival Trust also commission up to six new works each year. In 2017, they presented the new opera The Bone Feeder at the ASB Waterfront Theatre with music by Gareth Farr, based on a book by Renee Laing. In 2021 the festival programme was greatly affected by travel restrictions because of COVID-19. The programme of 70-plus events were therefore all from New Zealand.

== Festival Directors ==
Year	Artistic Director
2002	Mike Mizrahi & Marie Adams
2003–2004	Simon Prast
2005–2011	David Malacari
2013–2017	Carla Van Zon
2018–2020	Jonathan Bielski
2021–	Shona McCullagh [MNZM]

Festival staff include chief executive David Inns who started in 2009 working previously at the New Zealand Festival in Wellington. Inns was also instrumental in the annual music festival WOMAD being in Taranaki, and was the director of the Taranaki Arts Festival from 1998 to 2002. Robbie Macrae commenced as Chief Executive in August 2022.
