= Atamira Dance Company =

Māori contemporary dance company

Atamira Dance Company is a Māori contemporary dance company in Aotearoa (New Zealand) based at the Corban Estate Arts Centre in Auckland.

== History ==
In 2000, the company was founded from a vision of Jack Gray's for a collective of young Māori dancers and choreographers to present dance projects relative to their shared cultural heritage and perspective. The founding members were Gray, Dolina Wehipeihana, Louise Potiki Bryant and Justine Hohaia. The four met during 1999 while Gray and Wehipeihana were studying contemporary dance at UNITEC, subsequently becoming acquainted with Hohaia and Bryant at a tertiary dance festival. At that point Bryant was studying Māori Studies at University of Otago and Hohaia at Wellington's New Zealand School of Dance. Potiki Bryant went on to study at the dance programme at UNITEC.

Atamira Dance Company is part of a growth in contemporary Māori dance in New Zealand that started in the 1980s with companies like Te Kanikani O Te Rangatahi (1984) and Taiao (1988) created by Stephen Bradshaw. Then Merenia Gray started the Merenia Gray Dance Theatre in 1994. Okareka was formed in 2007 by Taiaroa Royal and Taane Mete.

In 2008 the Atamira Dance Collective Charitable Trust was established with the aim to 'foster, promote and develop Māori Contemporary Dance by providing a platform for Māori choreographers and dancers to create, develop, teach and present work and to assist those choreographers and dancers to achieve those objects.' The company's core funders are Creative New Zealand, ASB Community Trust, Te Waka Toi and Toi Māori Aotearoa.

In 2010 Moss Patterson was appointed as the first artistic director. In 2018 he resigned from his role and created his own company Tohu. Patterson has danced and choreographed for Atamira Dance Company, Black Grace Dance Company, Footnote Dance Company, and Touch Compass. He choreographed Te Paki, Haka, Te Whenua, Whakairo, and Moko for Atamira Dance Company. In 2007, Patterson was awarded Best Choreography by TEMPO Dance Festival and Best New Choreographer in the NZ Listener for Whakairo. Generating thinking about Māori creativity and contemporary arts practice is part of their work; in 2010 they facilitated post show talks with Moana Nepia, Selwyn Muru, Dr Huhana Smith and Louise Potiki Bryant.

Jack Gray was appointed artistic director following Patterson. The company is based in Corban Estate Arts Centre in West Auckland, New Zealand.

== About the Work ==
Atamira typically means stage, but a more in-depth meaning to the word relates to the process of caring for those who have died, and can also be said to mean showcase or platform. The company takes their personal stories and that of their whakapapa to relate to Aotearoa's history and contemporary issues. They are Auckland based but diversity is reflected in different iwi (tribal) connections from around New Zealand that the company members have.

Review of the show Manaia at the Hannah Playhouse in Wellington in 2017.

"These works once again display Atamira's brilliance at conveying strong themes that move us with their heart and spirituality and excite us with the power of the Company's performances."

== Shows ==
The programme of Atamira shows are often made up of shorter works that are combined into a season and tour. This list currently makes no distinction between the individual works and the combined presentation.

- Freshly Minted (2001)
- Sub-urban Legends (2002), Unitec Dance Studio
- Memoirs of Active Service (2006) choreographed by Maaka Pepene and score by Paddy Free to commemorate the Year of the Veteran, and inspired by a diary of Pepene's grandfather Jack Murphy.
- Whakairo (2007)
- Ngai Tahu 32 (2004)
- Taonga: Dust, Water, Wind (2009)
- Whetu (2010)
- Hou (2010)
- Te Urewera (2011)
- Te Houhi: The People and the Land are One (2011)
- Kaha: Short Works (2012)
- Tohu (2012)
- Moko (2015) Toured to the Beijing Dance Festival and the Chang Mu Dance Festival in 2015. Transformative set designed by Robin Rawstorne, with motion-triggered projections by Dan Mace and Puck Murphy and sound-score by Peter Hobbs.
- Mitimiti
- Awa: When two rivers collide (2017) choreographed by Moss Patterson. Collaboration with the Auckland Philharmonic Orchestra, the Auckland Chinese Philharmonic choir, guests dancers from China, and children's choir Te Kura Kaupapa o te Kotuku.
- Atamira (2017) choreographed by Kelly Nash
- Onepū (2018)
- Pango (2018) choreographed by Moss Patterson, live music by Shayne Carter. Tour - China, Taiwan and New Zealand.
- Ngā Wai (2020) choreographed by Sean MacDonald, inspired by the sacred waters of Wāimarama. Premiered at Q Theatre
