= Douglas Wright (dancer) =

New Zealand dancer and choreographer

Douglas Wright MNZM
- Born: Douglas James Wright; 14 October 1956; Tuakau, New Zealand
- Died: 14 November 2018 (aged 62); Auckland, New Zealand
- Occupations: Dancer, choreographer, poet
- Years active: 1980–2008
- Dancing career
- Former groups: Limbs Dance Company, Paul Taylor Company, Douglas Wright Dance Company

Douglas James Wright MNZM (14 October 1956 – 14 November 2018) was a New Zealand dancer and choreographer in the New Zealand arts establishment from 1980 until his death in 2018. Although he announced his retirement from dance in 2008, on the occasion of the publication of his first book of poetry, Laughing Mirror he subsequently continued to make dance works, including touring The Kiss Inside during April 2015.

== Biography ==
Wright was born in Tuakau, South Auckland, in 1956. From 1980 to 1983 he danced with the Limbs Dance Company and choreographed a number of works on the company before travelling to New York where he danced with the Paul Taylor Company, 1983–1987 and London with DV8 Physical Theatre, 1988. Returning to New Zealand in 1989, he formed the Douglas Wright Dance Company, with which he created more than 30 major works, touring New Zealand, Australia and Europe.

In the 1998 Queen's Birthday Honours, Wright was appointed a Member of the New Zealand Order of Merit, for services to dance.

In 2000 Wright received one of five inaugural Arts Laureate awards from the Arts Foundation of New Zealand and in 2003 he was the subject of an award-winning feature-length documentary film, Haunting Douglas, directed by Leanne Pooley for Spacific Films.

With the launch of Laughing Mirror, Wright announced his retirement from dance. Subsequently, however, during 2010 he workshopped material towards a new major group work commissioned for Auckland Festival 2011, which premiered on 16 March 2011 at The Civic Theatre as rapt, and at the Hague, in the Netherlands during 2013. During 2014 and 2015, he workshopped and developed material towards The Kiss Inside a further major group work commissioned for the New Zealand Festival, which premiered on 16 April 2015 at SkyCity Theatre, Auckland before touring to Wānaka, Dunedin, and Nelson after which touring followed on the North Island of New Zealand during March 2016. During 2018, he choreographed a solo M_nod on dancer Sean MacDonald, which had its premiere in the Grey Lynn Public Library hall to an invited audience during July, and was publicly presented in Q Theatre's Vault during Tempo Dance Festival 2018. The work was commissioned by Auckland Art Gallery director Michael Lett, and a film was made of the work.

Wright died 14 November 2018, aged 62, from cancer.

== Published works ==
He wrote two volumes of semi-fiction/semi-autobiography, Ghost Dance (Penguin, 2004 – Montana Awards Best First Book of Non-Fiction, 2004) and Terra Incognito (2006), and also hosted an inaugural one-man exhibition of his paintings and multimedia sculptures. In October 2007 a poetry collection, Laughing Mirror was published by Steele Roberts. A second collection of his poems, cactusfear was published by Steele Roberts in October 2011, and a retrospective exhibition of his work as a choreographer, based on photographs, films and writing, was held at The University of Auckland's Gus Fisher Gallery in 2012.

== Choreographic works ==
- 1981 – Back Street Primary (poetry, J Frame; mus. Talking Heads), Limbs Dance Company, Auckland
- 1982 – Late Afternoon of a Faun or Thrilled to Bits (solo, after Nijinsky; mus. Debussy), Limbs Dance Company, Auckland
- 1982 – Baby Go Boom (mus. Holiday. Armstrong, Farnell), Limbs Dance Company, Auckland
- 1982 – Kneedance (mus. Anderson), Limbs Dance Company, Auckland
- 1982 – Walking on Thin Ice (mus. Ono), Limbs Dance Company, Auckland
- 1982 – Aurora Borealis (mus. Ono, Anderson, Hagen), Limbs Dance Company, Auckland
- 1983 – Land of a Thousand Dances (mus. Small, Pickett), Limbs Dance Company, Auckland
- 1983 – Sorry to have Missed You (mus. Tartini), Royal New Zealand Ballet, New Moves, Wellington
- 1983 – Ranterstantrum (mus. Branca), Limbs Dance Company, Auckland
- 1983 – Dog Dance (solo; mus. Cage), Douglas Wright, New York
- 1984 – Threnody (solo; mus. Penderecki), Douglas Wright, Auckland
- 1984 – It's Not Unusual (mus. Tom Jones), Douglas Wright and Brian Carbee, Auckland
- 1984 – Cubist Cowboy Shootout (with Brian Carbee; mus. various), Auckland
- 1985 – Halcyon (mus. Vivaldi), Limbs Dance Company, Whangārei
- 1986 – Parallel (mus. Busby), for two gymnasts, New York
- 1987 – Hey Paris (mus. Ayler, Hirt, Nancarrow), Douglas Wright and Dancers, New York
- 1987 – Quartet (mus. Vivaldi), Douglas Wright and Dancers, New York
- 1987 – Faun Variations (solo; mus. Ravel), Paul Taylor Company, City Centre, New York
- 1988 – Now is the Hour (mus. McGlashan and various), Limbs Dance Company, New Zealand International Festival of the Arts, Wellington
- 1988 – Aria (solo, text Dostoevsky), MJ O'Reilly, Auckland
- 1989 – How on Earth (mus. various), Douglas Wright Dance Company, Auckland
- 1989 – a far Cry (mus. Bartok), Australian Dance Theatre, Adelaide
- 1990 – Passion Play: A New Dance (with Kilda Northcott), Wellington
- 1990 – Gloria (mus. Vivaldi), Douglas Wright Dance Company, Wellington
- 1990 – I Am A Dancer/Gloria (documentary film/dance, dir. Bollinger/ Oomen), Top Shelf Productions, TV1 national television broadcast, Sunday Arts
- 1991 – As It Is (mus. Bartok, Laird), Douglas Wright Dance Company, Auckland
- 1992 – Beethoven (mus. Beethoven and the Shangri-Las), graduating students of the Performing Arts School, Auckland
- 1992 – The Decay of Lying (text, Wilde; mus. Lully), The Royal New Zealand Ballet, Wellington
- 1992 – Elegy for Jim, Leigh and Bayly (solo, mus. Wilson), Artzaid Benefit, Wellington
- 1993 – Forever (mus. various; film Graves; design Pearce), Douglas Wright Dance Company, Auckland
- 1993 – Elegy for Jim, Leigh and Bayly (dance film; dir. Graves), New Zealand International Film Festival, Wellington
- 1994 – As It Is – A Fragment (for television broadcast, dir. Graves mus. Bartok, Laird), Dance and the Camera, Television New Zealand, national broadcast, TV1 Work of Art
- 1995 Forever (dance film co-directed with Chris Graves), TV1 national television broadcast, Work of Art
- 1996 – Ore (solo), Next Wave Festival, Auckland
- 1996 – Ore (dance film; co-directed with Chris Graves), International Film Festival, Wellington
- 1996 – Buried Venus (mus. Farr and various; design, Pearce), Douglas Wright Dance Company, New Zealand International Festival of the Arts, Wellington
- 1996 – Aida (directed by Wright), Victorian State Opera, Melbourne
- 1997 – Forbidden Memories (a work for theatre based on a novel by James Purdy with design by John Verryt), Auckland
- 1997 – Cunning Little Vixen (directed by Wright), Opera Australia, Sydney
- 1997 – Rose and Fell (mus. Part, Gubaidulina, Mussorgsky), The Royal New Zealand Ballet, Wellington
- 2000 - Halo, The Royal New Zealand Ballet, Wellington
- 2002 – Inland New Zealand International Festival of the Arts, Wellington and national tour (mus Juliet Palmer, video Florian Habicht, costumes Tanya Carlson, text Douglas Wright and Peta Rutter, design John Verryt )
- 2006 – Black Milk (mus. David Long, design and costumes Michael Pearce, lighting Robert Ghesquiere, text and banners Douglas Wright )
- 2007 – Tama ma duet commissioned by Taane Mete and Taiaroa Royal as the second of five sections comprising a larger work of the same name which premiered in the Concert Chamber, Auckland Town Hall, October 2008, subsequently toured New Zealand, and began international touring commitments in 2010.
- 2007 – a small dance for the children's theatre work Rumplestiltskin (Phineas Phrog Productions)
- 2007 – He then choreographed a dance especially for his niece Sarah
- 2011 – rapt – commissioned by Auckland Festival
- 2015 – The Kiss Inside – commissioned by the New Zealand Festival
- 2018 – M_nod – commissioned by Michael Lett
