= Arts Foundation of New Zealand =

Arts organisation in New Zealand

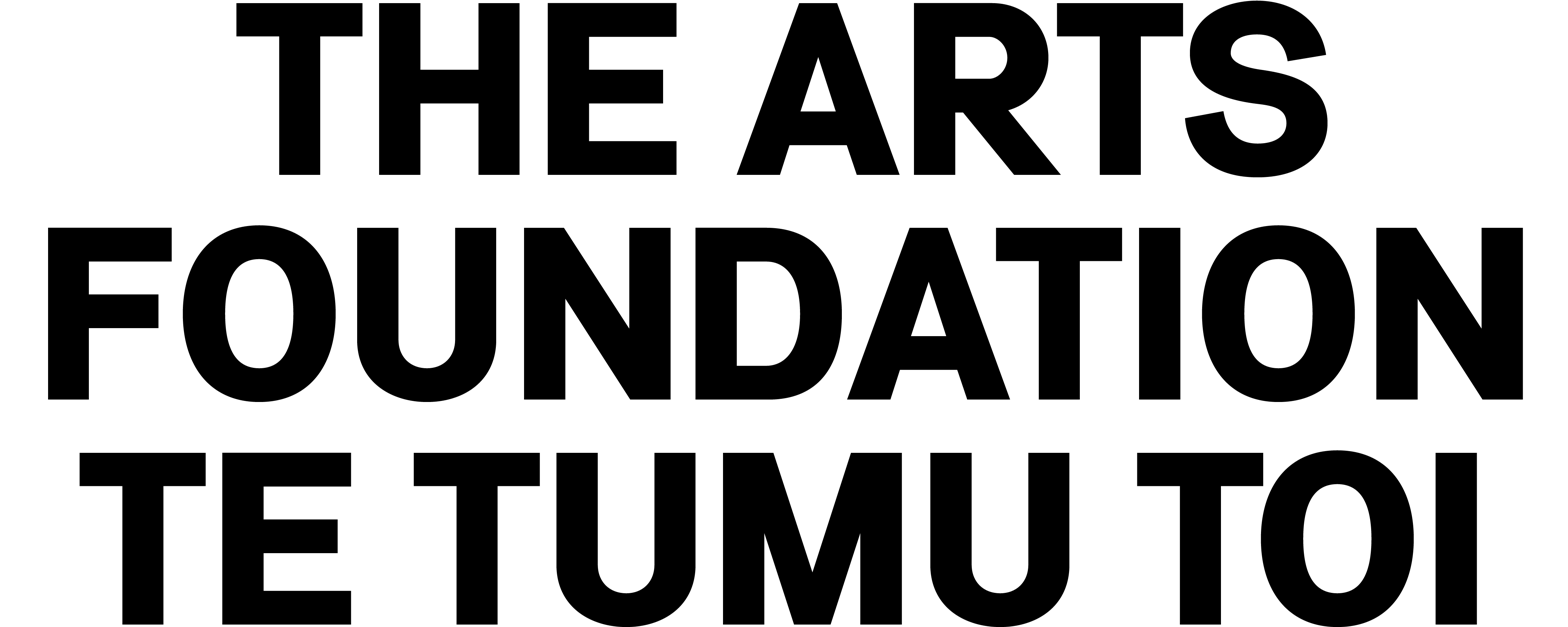
- Formation: 2000
- Legal status: Charity
- Purpose: Fund-raising and providing grants for arts, culture and heritage
- Location: Christchurch
- Region served: New Zealand
- Budget: NZ$1.12 million (2010)
- Staff: 3
- Volunteers: 1
- Website: www.thearts.co.nz

The Arts Foundation of New Zealand Te Tumu Toi is a New Zealand arts organisation that supports artistic excellence and facilitates private philanthropy through raising funds for the arts and allocating it to New Zealand artists.

The foundation produces award programmes that provide recognition and money prizes to New Zealand artists working in across all art forms. This includes writers, fine artists, musicians, dancers, choreographers, theatre-makers and screen artists.

== Background ==
The concept of setting up an organisation to raise private funding for the arts was initiated by Creative New Zealand in 1997. Its chair Brian Stevenson approached Richard Cathie to chair a working party on the subject and Sir Ronald Scott was appointed consultant, with help from Gisella Carr. Early working party members and trustees included Mary, Lady Hardie Boys; Gillian, Lady Deane; Dame Jenny Gibbs; Sir Paul Reeves; Sir John Todd; Sir Miles Warren; and Sir Eion Edgar.

The foundation was incorporated as a charitable Trust in 1998 with Richard Cathie remaining as chair. Seed funding of $5m was secured from The Lottery Grants Board payable over five years and the foundation was launched in 2000.

Previous foundation logo until 2024

In 2002, Simon Bowden was appointed Executive Director and in 2003 the organisation held its first awards. By 2008 the Arts Foundation had established an endowment fund of NZ$6 million and donated $3 million to over 100 artists across arts disciplines.

In 2012, the Arts Foundation launched Boosted a crowdsourced funding platform. The Arts Foundation Awards celebrate achievement in an artists career. Donations come from Patrons of the Arts Foundation and other sources and are awarded directly to artists at the annual New Zealand Arts Awards.

Promotion of the arts is also part of the mandate of the Arts Foundation. In September 2019, the Arts Foundation launched the first New Zealand Arts Month. This campaign was supported by Creative NZ, Chartwell Trust, NZME, Phantom and Go Media.

Jessica Palalagi was appointed general manager in 2022.

== Awards ==
There is no application process for the awards. Artists are selected by an independent panel of arts peers or curators and recipients of awards are selected without their knowing they are under consideration. The Arts Foundation administers this process.

The Icon Awards, Whakamana Hiranga recognise a lifetime of achievement. Artists considered to have prominence and outstanding potential receive The Laureate Award. Artists in the early stages of their career were selected to receive a New Generation Award, and now receive a Springboard Award and mentorship from a Laureate or Icon.

In partnership, the foundation produces the Marti Friedlander Photographic Award, of $25,000NZD to assist the career of a photographer, and the Harriet Friedlander Residency, which is a residency in New York valued at $80,000NZD.

The Mallinson Rendel Illustrators Award was presented for the first time in 2011. The award is presented every two years to a children's book illustrator with published work of a high standard and includes a cash gift of $15,000.

In 2021, The Arts Foundation honoured artist and Māori Arts curator Nigel Borell with the "A Moment In Time He Momo" award.

The Arts Foundation also administers the Katherine Mansfield Menton Fellowship awarding a residency to Menton in France for a writer.

== Icon Award ==
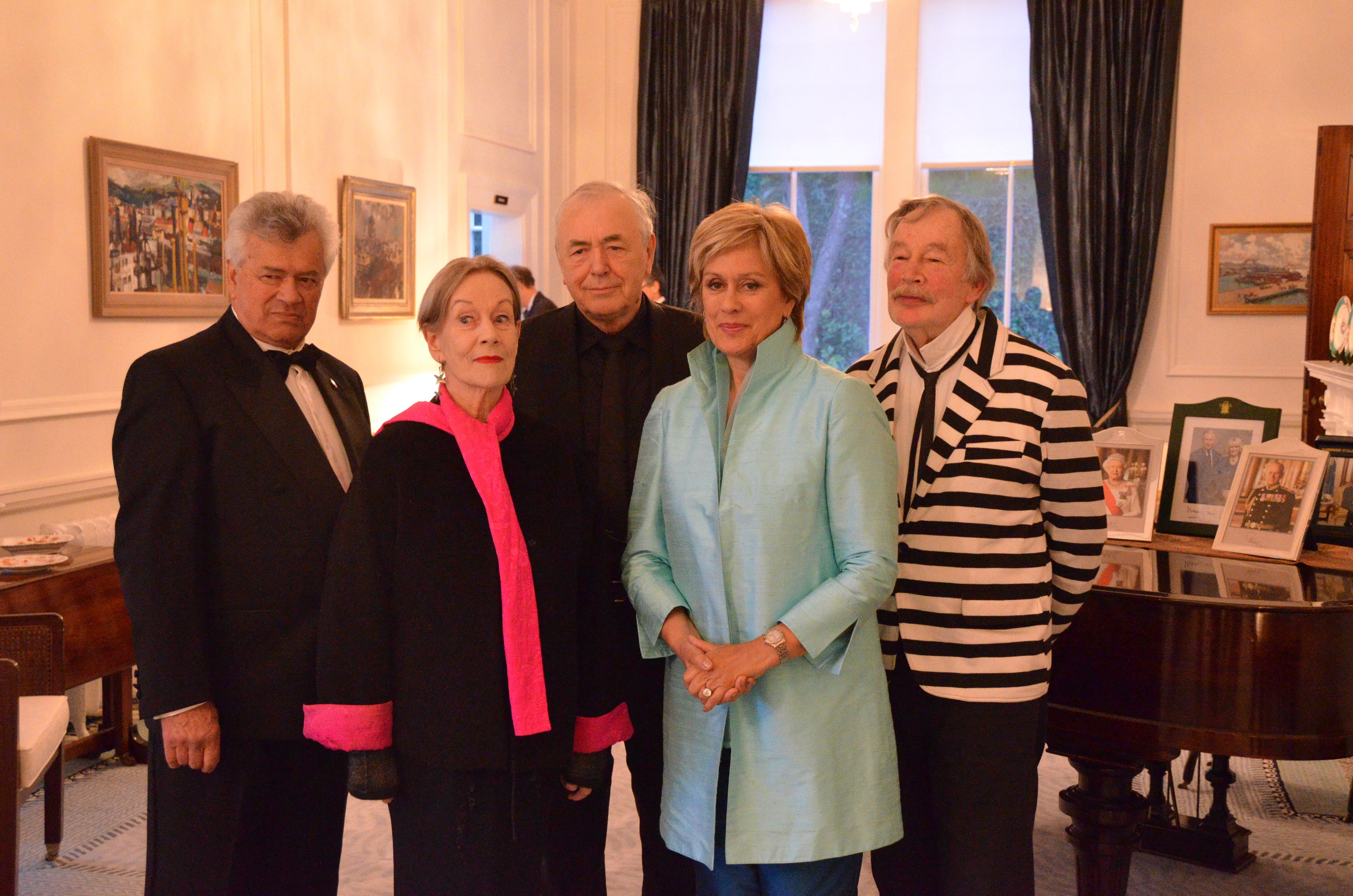
The 2013 recipients of Arts Foundation Icon Awards, at a reception at Government House, Wellington. Left to right: Cliff Whiting, Jacqueline Fahey, Geoff Murphy, Kiri Te Kanawa, and Ian Athfield.

The Arts Foundation of New Zealand established the Icon Awards as a means to celebrate and acknowledge New Zealand art-makers who have achieved the highest standards of artistic expression.

Limited to a living circle of 20, Icons are pioneers and leaders from all arts disciplines, living and working around the world. To date, 41 artists have been acknowledged as Icons. In 2003, eight artists were honoured, followed by one in 2004, seven in 2005, five in 2007, five in 2011, five in 2013, two in 2015, five in 2018, and three in 2020.

Each Icon receives a medallion and pin designed by sculptor John Edgar. The recipient is gifted the pin in perpetuity, while the medallion is presented to a successor at a future Icon Award ceremony following the artist's death.

In 2008 the Arts Foundation began commissioning oral histories from Icons. In time, the foundation hopes that an oral history will be deposited with the Alexander Turnbull Library in Wellington covering the life of each Icon artist. This will ensure the artists' stories are on public record and available for future generations.

In October 2020, multiple allegations of historical sexual abuse were made against composer Jack Body, who had received the award in 2015 shortly before his death, by a number of his former students. In November 2020, the allegations were described by Victoria University as "very credible", and the Arts Foundation announced that it had suspended Body's status as an Arts Icon while it "awaited further information". In January 2022, following a formal apology by the university to these students, the Arts Foundation confirmed that his award was no longer recognised by the organisation.

=== Living Icons ===
	Name	Portrait	Year of award	Age	Discipline
1	Patricia Grace; DCNZM QSO		2005	89	Writer
2	Dame Gillian Weir; DBE		2011	85	Organist
3	Sir Peter Jackson; ONZ KNZM		2011	65	Filmmaker
4	Jacqueline Fahey; ONZM		2013	96–97	Painter
5	Dame Kiri Te Kanawa; ONZ CH DBE AC		2013	82	Opera singer
6	Albert Wendt; ONZ CNZM		2018	87	Writer
7	Bill Manhire; CNZM		2018	79	Writer
8	Dame Gillian Whitehead; DNZM		2018	85	Composer
9	Joy Cowley; ONZ DCNZM OBE		2020	90	Writer
10	Sandy Adsett; MNZM		2020	87	Visual artist
11	Fatu Feu'u; ONZM		2022	79–80	Visual artist
12	Dame Jane Campion; DNZM		2022	72	Film director / writer
13	Dame Robin White; DNZM		2022	80	Artist
14	Sir Pita Sharples; KNZM CBE		2024	85	Kapa haka, mau rākau
15	Neil Finn; OBE		2024	68	Musician
16	Witi Ihimaera Smiler; DCNZM QSM		2026	82	Writer
17	Darcy Nicholas; QSO		2026	80–81	Painter and sculptor
18	Ann Robinson; ONZM		2026	81–82	Glass artist
19	Lynda Topp (Topp Twins); DNZM		2026	68	Musician and comedian
20	Vacant				

=== Deceased Icons ===
Name	Portrait	Year of award	Date of death	Discipline
Maurice Gee		2003	12 June 2025	Novelist
Len Castle; DCNZM CBE		2003	29 September 2011	Potter
Janet Frame; ONZ CBE		2003	29 January 2004	Writer
Ralph Hotere; ONZ		2003	24 February 2013	Painter
Milan Mrkusich; ONZM		2003	13 June 2018	Visual artist
Diggeress Te Kanawa; CNZM QSO		2003	30 July 2009	Weaver
Hone Tuwhare		2003	16 January 2008	Poet
Sir Miles Warren; ONZ KBE		2003	9 August 2022	Architect
Sir Donald McIntyre; CBE		2004	13 November 2025	Opera singer
Peter Godfrey; CBE		2005	28 September 2017	Musician
Alexander Grant; CBE		2005	30 September 2011	Ballet dancer
Pakaariki Harrison; QSO		2005	29 December 2008	Carver
Russell Kerr; ONZM QSM		2005	23 March 2022	Choreographer
Margaret Mahy; ONZ		2005	23 July 2012	Writer
Donald Munro; MBE		2005	18 January 2012	Opera singer
Raymond Boyce; MBE		2007	1 August 2019	Theatre designer
Don Peebles; ONZM		2007	27 March 2010	Painter
Don Selwyn; ONZM		2007	13 April 2007	Actor
Arnold Manaaki Wilson; MNZM QSM		2007	1 May 2012	Sculptor
Ans Westra; CNZM		2007	26 February 2023	Photographer
Barbara Anderson		2011	24 March 2013	Writer
Marti Friedlander; CNZM		2011	14 November 2016	Photographer
Greer Twiss; ONZM		2011	15 July 2025	Sculptor
Sir Ian Athfield; KNZM		2013	16 January 2015	Architect
Geoff Murphy; ONZM		2013	3 December 2018	Filmmaker
Cliff Whiting; ONZ		2013	16 July 2017	Artist and heritage advocate
Jim Allen; MNZM		2015	9 June 2023	Visual artist
Billy Apple; ONZM		2018	6 September 2021	Visual artist
Fred Graham; ONZM		2018	9 May 2025	Carver and sculptor
Sir Sam Neill; KNZM OBE		2020	13 July 2026	Actor
Jools Topp (Topp Twins); DNZM		2026	23 May 2026	Musician and comedian

== Laureate Award ==
The Arts Foundation began granting Laureate awards to New Zealand's most distinguished artists in 2000. The Arts Foundation website states:

Arts Foundation Laureate Awards celebrate and empower New Zealand’s most outstanding practising artists – artists whose practise also has an impact on New Zealand.

Laureate Awards are granted to New Zealanders practicing in any arts discipline, located anywhere in the world. The criteria has changed away from the terminology of 'best' which is subjective in the arts, instead focusing on the significance of work and the impact on New Zealand. Laureates are able to use their award in any way they choose, for example, in the creation of new works, or the freedom to concentrate time and resources into the development of their career.

Initially there were five artists honoured annually at the New Zealand Arts Awards ceremony receiving a Laureate Award of a NZ$50,000 grant each and a commissioned sculpture by Terry Stringer. No awards were awarded in 2018, and in 2019 the amount of the prize changed to NZ$25,000, new partnerships and awards were introduced and it was announced that the Laureate Award would be given to up to ten practising artists. In 2024, Laureates received $35,000, and in 2025 the amount was increased back to $50,000.

=== Named awards ===
Established in 2019:

- The Theresa Gattung Female Arts Practitioners Award (awarded every year)
- The Burr/ Tatham Trust Award (awarded every second year)
- Gaylene Preston Documentary Film Makers Award (NZ$30,000 awarded every second year)

Established in 2020:

- The Sir Roger Hall Theatre Award (NZ$25,000 awarded every second year, $5,000 awarded to more people the other year as Out of the Limelight awards)
- The My Art Visual Arts Award (awarded every year)
- Te Moana-nui-a-Kiwa Award

=== Recipients ===
2000

- Briar Grace-Smith, Theatre
- Elizabeth Knox, Literature
- Peter Peryer, Visual Arts
- Gillian Whitehead, Music
- Douglas Wright, Dance

2001

- Phil Dadson, Visual Arts
- Kate De Goldi, Literature
- Michael Parekowhai, Visual Arts
- Gaylene Preston, Film/Moving Image

2002

- Warwick Freeman, Visual Arts
- Shona McCullagh, Dance
- Don McGlashan, Music
- Helen Medlyn, Music
- Jacob Rajan, Theatre

2003

- Jenny Bornholdt, Literature
- Neil Dawson, Visual Arts
- Michael Hurst, Theatre
- Humphrey Ikin, Visual Arts
- John Psathas, Music

2004

- Barry Barclay, Film/Moving Image
- Jack Body, Music
- Derek Lardelli, Visual Arts
- John Pule, Visual Arts
- Ann Robinson, Visual Arts

2005

- Neil Ieremia, Dance
- Bill Manhire, Literature
- Julia Morison, Visual Arts
- Simon O'Neill, Music
- Ronnie van Hout, Visual Arts

2006

- Alun Bollinger, Film/Moving Image
- Alastair Galbraith, Music
- Oscar Kightley, Theatre
- John Reynolds, Visual Arts
- Ian Wedde, Literature

2007

- Michael Houstoun, Music
- Sarah-Jayne Howard, Dance
- Colin McColl, Theatre
- Moana Maniapoto, Music
- Merilyn Wiseman, Visual Arts

2008

- Shane Cotton, Visual Arts
- Ngila Dickson, Visual Arts
- George Henare, Theatre
- Lloyd Jones, Literature
- Teddy Tahu Rhodes, Music

2009

- Lyonel Grant, Visual Arts
- Witi Ihimaera, Literature
- Chris Knox, Music
- Richard Nunns, Music
- Anne Noble, Visual Arts

2010

- Stuart Devenie, Theatre
- Michael Parmenter, Dance
- Leon Narbey, Film/Moving Image
- Gareth Farr, Music
- John Parker, Visual Arts

2011

- Whirimako Black, Music
- Fiona Pardington, Visual Arts
- Emily Perkins, Literature
- Lemi Ponifasio, Dance
- Leanne Pooley, Film/Moving Image

2012

- Ruia Aperahama, Music
- Tony de Lautour, Visual Arts
- Rachel House, Theatre
- Gregory O'Brien, Literature
- Fiona Samuel, Theatre

2013

- Laurence Aberhart, Visual Arts
- Jane Campion, Film/Moving Image
- Dean Parker, Theatre
- Damien Wilkins, Literature
- Megan Wraight, landscape architect

2014

- Cliff Curtis, Film
- Lisa Reihana, Visual Arts
- Geoff Cochrane, Literature
- Ross Harris, Music
- Charles Koroneho, Dance

2015

- Delaney Davidson – Music
- Sara Brodie – Theatre / Dance
- Wetini Mitai-Ngatai – Performance / Cultural Entrepreneurship
- Daniel Belton – Music / Dance / Film
- Lisa Walker – Visual Art

2016

- Eleanor Catton – writer
- Lyell Cresswell – composer
- Dylan Horrocks – cartoonist, graphic novelist, writer
- Peter Robinson – visual artist
- Taika Waititi – filmmaker

2017

- Niki Caro – director, filmmaker
- Jemaine Clement – actor, writer, comedian, multi-instrumentalist
- Ross McCormack – choreographer, contemporary dancer
- Rob Ruha – haka soul musician
- Robin White – painter, printmaker

2019

- Sima Urale – filmmaker
- Pietra Brettkelly – filmmaker
- Solomon Mortimer – photographer
- Laurence Fearnley – writer
- Kris Sowersby – typographer
- Louise Potiki Bryant – choreographer
- Ruth Paul – writer, illustrator
- Val Smith – performance artist
- Coco Solid – mixed-media artist
- Yvonne Todd – photographer

2020

- Yuki Kihara – interdisciplinary artist
- Ariana Tikao – singer, composer, taonga puoro player
- Moss Te Ururangi Patterson – choreographer, artistic director
- Ahi Karunaharan – actor, writer, director, producer
- FAFSWAG – interdisciplinary arts
- Shayne Carter – musician, author
- Tusiata Avia – poet, writer, performer

2021

- Nigel Borell – art curator
- Shane Bosher – actor, theatre director
- Harry Culy – photographer
- Brett Graham – sculptor
- Florian Habicht – film director
- Rangi Kipa – carver, illustrator
- Nina Nawalowalo – theatre director
- Maisey Rika – musician
- Vasanti Unka – writer, illustrator

2022

- Lindah Lepou – fashion designer
- Tame Iti – activist, artist, poet and actor
- Mata Aho Collective – Māori women's art collective
- Maureen Lander – multimedia installation artist
- Areta Wilkinson – jeweller
- Hone Kouka – playwright
- Paula Morris – novelist, essayist and short story writer

2023

- Peter Black – photography
- Fiona Clark – visual activist, photographer
- Giselle Clarkson – illustration
- Annie Goldson – documentary film
- Bob Jahnke – sculpture
- Sean MacDonald – dance
- Ladi6 – music
- Taiaroa Royal – dance
- Filipe Tohi – sculpture

2024

- Alison Wong – literature
- Claire Cowan – music
- Carin Wilson – design/sculpture
- Horomona Horo – taonga pūoro/composer
- Lonnie Hutchinson – visual arts
- Miriama McDowell – theatre
- Saskia Leek – visual arts
- Victor Rodger – theatre

2025

- Bill Direen – music, literature
- Roseanne Liang – film
- Cheryl Lucas – ceramics
- Kate Newby – sculpture
- Reuben Paterson – visual arts
- Pene Pati – opera
- Séraphine Pick – visual arts
- Shona Rapira Davies – sculpture, visual arts

2026

- Catherine Chidgey – literature
- et al. – visual arts
- Emily Karaka – painting
- Victoria Kelly – music
- Tyrone Ohia – design
- Anapela Polataivao – theatre
- Madeleine Sami – film and television
- Sriwhana Spong – multidisciplinary

Out of the Limelight Award recipients for 2021 were:

- Elizabeth Whiting – costume designer
- Marcus McShane – lighting designer and visual artist
- Harold Moot – set designer
- Eric Gardiner – stage manager
- Playmarket – the playwrights’ agency and script development organisation

== New Generation Award ==
The Arts Foundation of New Zealand New Generation Awards, celebrate artists’ early achievements through an investment in each recipient’s career. Biennially, five artists are awarded $25,000NZD each, and a sculpture designed by glass artist Christine Cathie. Although still at an early stage of their career, the artists will have already demonstrated excellence and innovation through their work.

Similar to other Arts Foundation Awards, the New Generation Award may be presented to an artist working in any arts discipline. Teacher, critic, theorist and organiser of contemporary creative practices, Jon Bywater (Auckland) curated the award in 2006, while writer, teacher, painter, curator Gregory O'Brien (Wellington) undertook the role in 2008 and arts radio journalist Lynn Freeman in 2010.

=== Recipients ===
2007

- Eve Armstrong, Visual artists
- Warren Maxwell, Music
- Tze Ming Mok, Literature
- Joe Sheehan, Visual arts
- Taika Waititi, Film/moving image

2008

- Jeff Henderson, Music
- Alex Monteith, Visual arts*
- Madeleine Pierard, Music
- Jo Randerson, Literature
- Pippa Sanderson, Literature

2010

- Eleanor Catton, Literature
- Ngaahina Hohaia, Visual arts
- Anna Leese, Music
- Kate Parker, Theatre/Puppetry*
- Mark Albiston and Louis Sutherland, Film/moving image (joint recipients)

2011

- Ben Cauchi, Visual arts
- Sam Hamilton, Music
- Eli Kent, Theatre

2012

- Pip Adam, Literature
- Shigeyuki Kihara, Visual arts
- Cameron McMillan, Dance

2013

- Kushana Bush, Visual Arts
- Kip Chapman, Theatre
- SJD (Sean James Donnelly), Music

2014

- Dudley Benson, Music
- Star Gossage, Visual Arts
- Vela Manusaute and Anapela Polataivao, Theatre (joint recipients)

2015

- Anna Smaill, Literature
- Simon Denny, Visual artist
- Tusi Timothy Tamasese, Film

2016

- Alex Taylor, Composer

2017

- Hera Lindsay Bird – Poet
- Salina Fisher – Contemporary classical composer, violinist
- Tiffany Singh – Interdisciplinary site specific installation based artist

== Springboard Award ==
From 2020 a Springboard award is given to up to ten emerging artists. This consists of NZ$15,000 and mentoring from one of the alumni of Arts Foundation Laureates, Icons, New Generation, residency or Fellowship recipients. Criteria relates to potential for a sustainable career.

=== Recipients ===
2020

- Min-Young Her – performance art, sculpture
- Matasila Freshwater – writer, director
- Ayesha Green – visual arts (painter)
- Arjuna Oakes – musician
- Moana Ete – writer, film maker, musician, curator
- Bala Murali Shingade – film maker, writer, theatre maker

2021

- Cora-Allan Wickliffe
- Cian Parker
- Ta’alili – Aloalii Tapu
- Tori Manley-Tapu
- Reuben Jelleyman
- Maisie Chilton
- Hōhua Ropate Kurene
- Larsen Winiata Tito-Taylor

2022

- Ana Scotney
- Bella Wilson
- Chevron Hassett
- Jesse Austin-Stewart
- Turumeke Harrington
- CONJAH
- Tyrone Te Waa

2023

- ‘Uhila Moe Langi Nai
- Amit Noy
- Freya Silas Finch
- Jaycee Tanuvasa
- Madison Kelly
- Sung Hwan 'Bobby' Park
- Tia Barrett

2024

- Emily Parr
- Emma Hislop
- Flo Wilson
- Hash Perambalam
- Joshua Faleatua and Tyler Carney-Faleatua
- Louie Zalk-Neale

2025

- Villa Junior Lemanu
- Talia Pua
- Qianye 林千叶 and Qianhe Lin 林千和
- Ming Ranginui
- Liam Wooding
- Jaya Beach-Robertson

== Mallinson Rendel Illustrators Award ==
The inaugural Mallinson Rendel Illustrators award, initially worth $10,000 occurred in 2011. It has been awarded every two years up to 2017, and has increased in value.

=== Recipients ===
- David Elliot (2011)
- Gavin Bishop (2013)
- Jenny Cooper (2015)
- Donovan Bixley (2017)
- Ruth Paul (2019)
- Josh Morgan (2025)

== Award for Patronage ==
The Arts Foundation of New Zealand Award for Patronage is made annually to a person, couple, or private trust for the outstanding private contributions they have made to the arts. The Award for Patronage is presented by Perpetual Trust.

As a community of artists and arts supporters, the Arts Foundation honours those who contribute significantly as patrons. Annually, a donation of $20,000NZD from the Arts Foundation is provided to the recipient of this award for them to distribute to artists, arts projects or arts organisations of their choice. Philanthropists Denis and Verna Adam (2006), Dame Jenny Gibbs (2007), Lady Gillian and Sir Roderick Deane (2008), Adrienne, Lady Stewart (2009) and Gus & Irene Fisher (2010) have been recipients. All recipients have chosen to double the funds for distribution through a matching contribution of $20,000NZD, with Gus and Irene Fisher donating $30,000NZD of their own funds, meaning an annual distribution of up to $50,000NZD. Recipients have also chosen to distribute an amount of $10,000 each to artists and /or arts projects.

== Governors' Award ==
The Arts Foundation of New Zealand Governors' Award recognises an individual or institution that has contributed in a significant way to the development of the arts and artists in New Zealand. The recipients are chosen by Arts Foundation Governors, with each recipient receiving a plaque designed by Auckland artist Jim Wheeler.

To date two awards have been made:

The inaugural recipient was the University of Otago in recognition of its contribution to the arts community through its Burns, Hodgkins and Mozart Fellowships. The three Fellowships were set up through the generosity of anonymous benefactors and have subsequently been funded by additional grants to maintain their value.

The second presentation was made to Concert FM (now Radio New Zealand Concert). The Arts Foundation of New Zealand Governors recognised the contribution that Concert FM has made in supporting New Zealand composers, musicians, writers and actors at a national level. The Arts Foundation also acknowledged Concert FM's contribution to the arts through its recording collaborations and the Douglas Lilburn Prize (a joint initiative between Concert FM and the New Zealand Symphony Orchestra).

In 2009 a third presentation was made to the Govett-Brewster Art Gallery, New Plymouth. In making their selection, Arts Foundation Governors acknowledged the commitment by the Govett-Brewster Art Gallery to the cause of contemporary art, particularly from Aotearoa New Zealand, over the last four decades.

== Marti Friedlander Photographic Award ==
The Marti Friedlander Photographic Award, supported by the Arts Foundation of New Zealand is presented every two years to an established photographer with a record of excellence and the potential to carry on producing work at high levels. The award includes a donation of $25,000NZD for the photographer to use as they please.

The inaugural recipient selected and announced by Marti Friedlander, was Edith Amituanai – a widely exhibited artist and a finalist in a number of awards, including the 2008 Walters Prize. Extended family and immediate community are primary subjects for Edith; she collaborates closely with her Christchurch and Auckland relatives as well as people she grew up with in West Auckland.

John Miller (an independent social documentary photographer, renowned particularly for his protest images) and Mark Adams (a photographer working with subjects of cross-cultural significance) were joint recipients in 2009.

=== Recipients ===
- Edith Amituanai (2007)
- John Miller and Mark Adams (2009)
- Neil Pardington (2011)
- Jono Rotman (2013)
- Rodney Charters (2015)
- Roberta Thornley (2017)
- Solomon Mortimer (2019)

== Harriet Friedlander Residency ==
On 26 June 2008, the Harriet Friedlander Scholarship Trust and the Arts Foundation launched a new international residency. A supporter of the arts, Harriet Friedlander also loved the vibrant culture of New York. When Michael and Harriet Friedlander and their sons Jason and Daniel designed the residency, Harriet was clear that she did not want to place any expectations or responsibilities on the recipient. An artist was to be sent to New York to have an "experience", all expenses paid, so that they could immerse themselves in the culture and process it in their own way.

One residency offered to a New Zealand artist with up to $80,000NZD made available every two years for their travel and living expenses. This opportunity is available to an artist aged 30 to 40, practicing in any discipline. The inaugural curator was Gregory O'Brien and the inaugural recipient was filmmaker Florian Habicht.

=== Recipients ===
- film maker Florian Habicht (2009)
- multimedia visual artist Seung Yul Oh (2010)
- playwright and actor Arthur Meek (2012)
- choreographer, dancer and video artist Louise Potiki Bryant (2014)
- filmmaker/cinematographer Christopher Pryor (2016)
- filmmaker/writer/director Miriam Smith (2016)
- composer and saxophonist Lucien Johnson (2018)
- dancer and choreographer Lucy Marinkovich (2018)
- performance artist Kalisolaite ‘Uhila (2021)
