= Jools Topp =

Member of the Topp Twins in New Zealand (1958–2026)

Dame Jools Topp DNZM
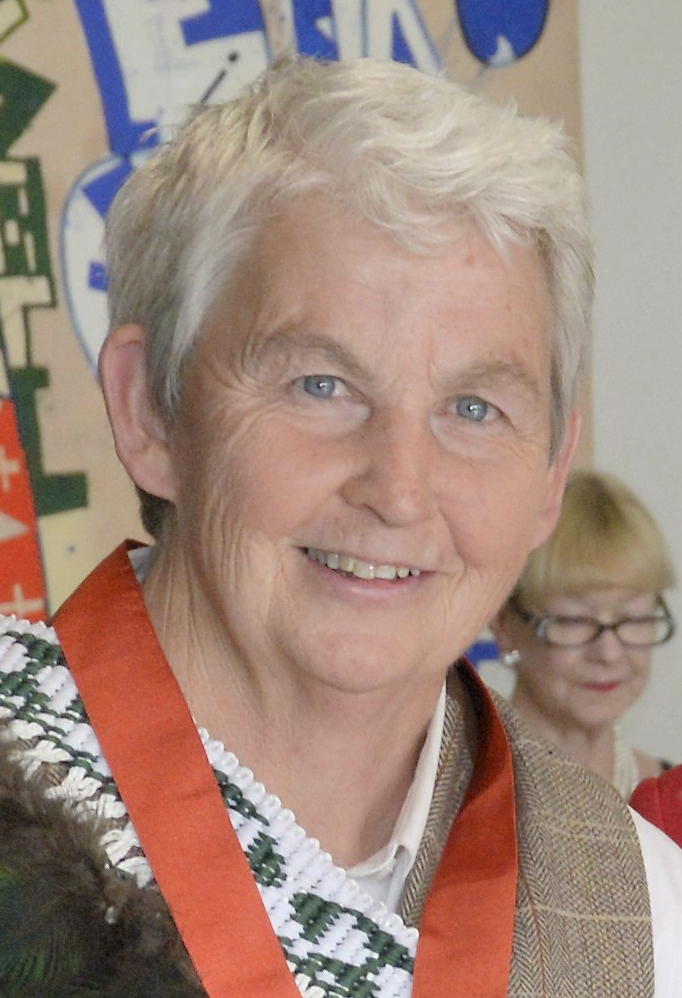
- Topp in 2018
- Born: Julie Bethridge Topp; 14 May 1958; Huntly, New Zealand
- Died: 23 May 2026 (aged 68)
- Occupation: Entertainer
- Years active: 1975–2026
- Known for: Topp Twins musical duo Lesbian activism
- Relatives: Lynda Topp (sister)

Dame Julie Bethridge Topp DNZM (14 May 1958 – 23 May 2026) was a New Zealand entertainer. She was one half of the Topp Twins, a music comedy duo; the other member was her twin sister Lynda Topp. With her sister, she became one of New Zealand's best-known entertainers through live performances, television and film over several decades. They combined country and folk music, comedy, and political activism, and performed as original characters including Ken & Ken and Camp Mother and Camp Leader. The sisters were both appointed Dames Companion of the New Zealand Order of Merit in the 2018 Queen's Birthday Honours.

The twins started their career busking in Christchurch and Auckland during the 1970s and performed at protests and public events relating to issues including women's rights, homosexual law reform, Māori land rights and opposition to the 1981 Springbok tour. They appeared in numerous television shows and were the subjects of the 2009 documentary film The Topp Twins: Untouchable Girls. They co-authored several books including their memoirs in 2003 and 2023; the latter won an award for being the best-selling New Zealand book in 2024.

== Early life and family ==
Jools Topp and her twin sister Lynda were born on 14 May 1958 in Huntly, to Jean and Peter, and grew up on a dairy farm in Waikato. Topp also had an older brother called Bruce. Topp attended Ruawaro Combined School during the 1960s and early 1970s. The twins sang together from when they were five years old and their brother gave them a guitar when they were 11.

After leaving Huntly College in 1976, Jools and Lynda Topp joined the New Zealand Territorial Force and were posted at the Burnham Military Camp near Christchurch for six weeks. They both started identifying as lesbian from the late 1970s. Much of their life was spent in the public eye and their mother was interviewed by Radio New Zealand about the closure of the New Zealand Woman's Weekly magazine in 2020, talking about how much her daughters had been featured in these magazines.

After Lynda's partner's son had a baby, Jools and Lynda commented that they had never expected to become a great-aunt and grandmother respectively because "We're all gay" (including their brother).

== Entertainment career ==
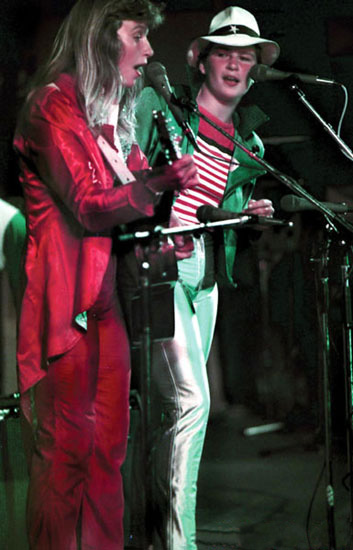
The Topp Twins in 1981

The Topp Twins' entertainment career began with busking in Christchurch and Auckland in the 1970s and 1980s. They soon began travelling and performing to university crowds around New Zealand. The twins sang country and folk music with harmonies; Lynda led the comedy and crowdwork, while Jools played the guitar and led songwriting.

In 1984, the twins were named performers of the year by New Zealand on Air, and in 1987 they received the top award for Best Entertainer at the Listener Film and Television Awards. In 1989, while busking on Queen Street in Auckland, the twins attracted a large crowd that the police said was obstructing traffic. The twins were taken to court but successfully defended the charge and benefited from the publicity.

The Topp Twins used their music to raise awareness of women's rights, gay rights, Māori land rights and other social issues. When they were 17, they performed at the Victorian Coffee Lounge (Montreal Street, Christchurch Central City), and through this met a group of radical lesbian feminists. They performed activist songs about lesbianism and feminism at various events including the Bastion Point land protest in 1978, the 1979 United Women's Convention in Hamilton, protests against the 1981 Springbok tour, anti-nuclear protests and homosexual law reform protests in the 1980s. Jools also had poetry published in the feminist magazine Broadsheet.

The twins were well-known for their costumed comedic characters, particularly the stereotypical "Kiwi blokes" Ken & Ken, and Camp Leader and Camp Mother. Jools played Camp Leader, who often rebelled against the domineering nature of Lynda's Camp Mother character. They appeared on New Zealand television in character many times, including in 2000 hosting a quiz show called Mr and Mrs, in which couples answered questions about how well they knew each other, and from 2014 to 2016 a cooking show called Topp Country.

In 2009 the documentary film The Topp Twins: Untouchable Girls, directed by Leanne Pooley, was released. It tells the story of the twins' life and career, including through interviews with the twins and their characters. From March to September 2018, they were the subject of a touring exhibition launched at the National Library of New Zealand. New Zealand prime minister Jacinda Ardern and former prime minister Helen Clark both attended the launch.

In 2023, the twins published their autobiography Untouchable Girls: The Topp Twins' Story. It received the Nielsen BookData NZ Award for bestselling New Zealand title at the 2024 Aotearoa New Zealand Book Industry Awards. A review by Ruth Spencer for Radio New Zealand described it as "a rollicking, intimate, uproarious romp through the triumphant lives of Jools and Lynda that will make you want to sing, to go on the road, ride horses, fall in love and never stop laughing".

== Horses ==
Topp was a skilled horsewoman and for many years had a 6.9 hectares (17 acres) property in Helensville, north of Auckland, with her partner. They had dogs, chickens, cattle, cats and about ten horses with an equestrian area. Called Liberty Circle Ranch, Topp's property helped families to rehabilitate and train horses through the business NZ Horse Help run by Teresa Trull and Michaela Evans. It was said Topp "answers her phone while riding her horses bareback in her arena". The property was sold when the couple split up after 17 years together.

== Illness and death ==
Jools Topp was diagnosed with breast cancer in October 2006 at the age of 48. Originally examined by a physician in January 2006, nothing was done as it was not detected by a mammogram. Topp was diagnosed seven months later when the breast cancer showed up with an ultrasound exam. She recovered well after receiving a mastectomy in October 2006 and several months of chemotherapy.

In March 2022, Jools and Lynda revealed that they had both been diagnosed with breast cancer in 2021.

Jools Topp died of her cancer on 23 May 2026, at the age of 68.

== Awards ==
- 1987 Listener Film and Television Awards. Best Entertainer: Topp Twins
- 1987 Listener Film and Television Awards. Best Entertainment Programme: Topp Twins Special
- 1987 Listener Film and Television Awards. Best Original Music: Topp Twins Special
- 1997 TV Guide Television Awards. Best Performance in an Entertainment Programme (shared with Lynda Topp): for Topp Twins, Do Not Adjust Your Twinset, episode 2
- 2004 New Zealand Order of Merit (shared with Lynda) for services to entertainment
- 2008 Inductee (with Lynda) to the New Zealand Music Hall of Fame
- 2009 Melbourne International Film Festival. Audience Award for Documentary: The Topp Twins: Untouchable Girls
- 2009 Qantas Film and Television Awards. Best Feature Film – Under $1 Million: The Topp Twins: Untouchable Girls
- 2009 Qantas Film and Television Awards. Original Music (shared with Lynda Topp): for The Topp Twins: Untouchable Girls
- 2009 Toronto International Film Festival. Audience Award for Documentary: The Topp Twins: Untouchable Girls
- 2010 Brattleboro Film Festival (United States). Best of Festival Award: The Topp Twins: Untouchable Girls
- 2010 FIFO Oceanian International Documentary Film Festival (Tahiti). Special Jury Award: The Topp Twins: Untouchable Girls
- 2010 Gothenburg International Film Festival (Sweden). Audience Dragon Award for Best Feature Film: The Topp Twins: Untouchable Girls
- 2010 Portland International Film Festival. Best Feature Documentary: The Topp Twins: Untouchable Girls
- 2010 Qantas Film and Television Awards. Best Entertainment Programme: The Topp Twins and The APO
- 2017 New Zealand Television Awards. Best Presenter – Entertainment (shared with Lynda Topp): for Topp Country, season two
- 2018 Dame Companion of the New Zealand Order of Merit for services to entertainment
- 2019 Lifetime Achievement Award at the NEXT Woman of the Year awards

== Screenography ==
Topp's screenography includes:

- Funny As: The Story of New Zealand Comedy 2019, Subject – Television
- Poi E: The Story of Our Song 2016, Subject – Film
- Topp Country 2014 – 2015, Presenter – Television
- The Topp Twins and the APO 2010, Presenter, Presenter – Television
- The Topp Twins: – Untouchable Girls, 2009, Subject – Film
- Ken's Hunting and Fishing Show, 2007, Actor – Television
- Ken's Hunting and Fishing Show – Tongariro, 2007, Musician, Actor – Television
- The Adventures of Roman Pilgrim, 2005, As: One of the Fates – Short Film
- Mr and Mrs, 2000, Presenter – Television
- In Search of the Lonesome Yodel, 2000, Presenter – Television
- The Topp Twins – Highland Games, 2000, Performer, Writer, Producer – Television
- The Topp Twins – Speedway, 1998, Producer, Performer, Writer – Television
- 1998 Hero Parade, 1998, Subject – Television
- Destination Planet Earth, 1997 – 1998, Subject – Television
- The Topp Twins, 1996 – 2000, Writer, Producer, Performer – Television
- The Topp Twins – The Beach, 1996, Performer, Producer, Writer – Television
- The Topp Twins: Do Not Adjust Your Twinset, 1996, Presenter – Television
- Beyond a Joke! 1995, Subject – Television
- The People Next Door, 1994, Subject – Television
- Camping Out with the Topp Twins, 1993, Subject – Television
- Rivers of NZ, 1992, Subject – Television
- Topp Twins TV Special, 1986, Subject
- That's Country, 1983 – 1984, Performer – Television

== Books ==
- Topp, Jools; Topp, Lynda (2023). Untouchable Girls: The Topp Twins' Story (1st ed.). Sydney: Allen & Unwin. ISBN 978-1-991006-38-7.
- Cuthbert, Arani; Topp, Jools (2018). Topp Country: A Culinary Journey Through New Zealand with the Topp Twins. Auckland: Diva. ISBN 978-0-473-44297-2.
- Topp, Jools; Topp, Lynda (2016). The Topp Twins Treasury of Sing-Along Stories. Illustrated by Jenny Cooper. Scholastic NZ. ISBN 978-1-77543-430-6.
- Topp, Jools; Topp, Lynda (2003). The Topp Twins Book. Penguin Books. ISBN 978-0-14-301860-5.

== Discography ==
The Topp Twins have released a number of vinyl records, tapes, and CDs.
