= Miriam Smith =

Miriam Smith may refer to:

- Miriam Smith (swimmer) (born 1958), American swimmer
- Miriam Smith (filmmaker), 21st century New Zealand filmmaker
- Miriam Tindall Smith (c. 1901–1973), American artist
