= Ruawaro =

- Township
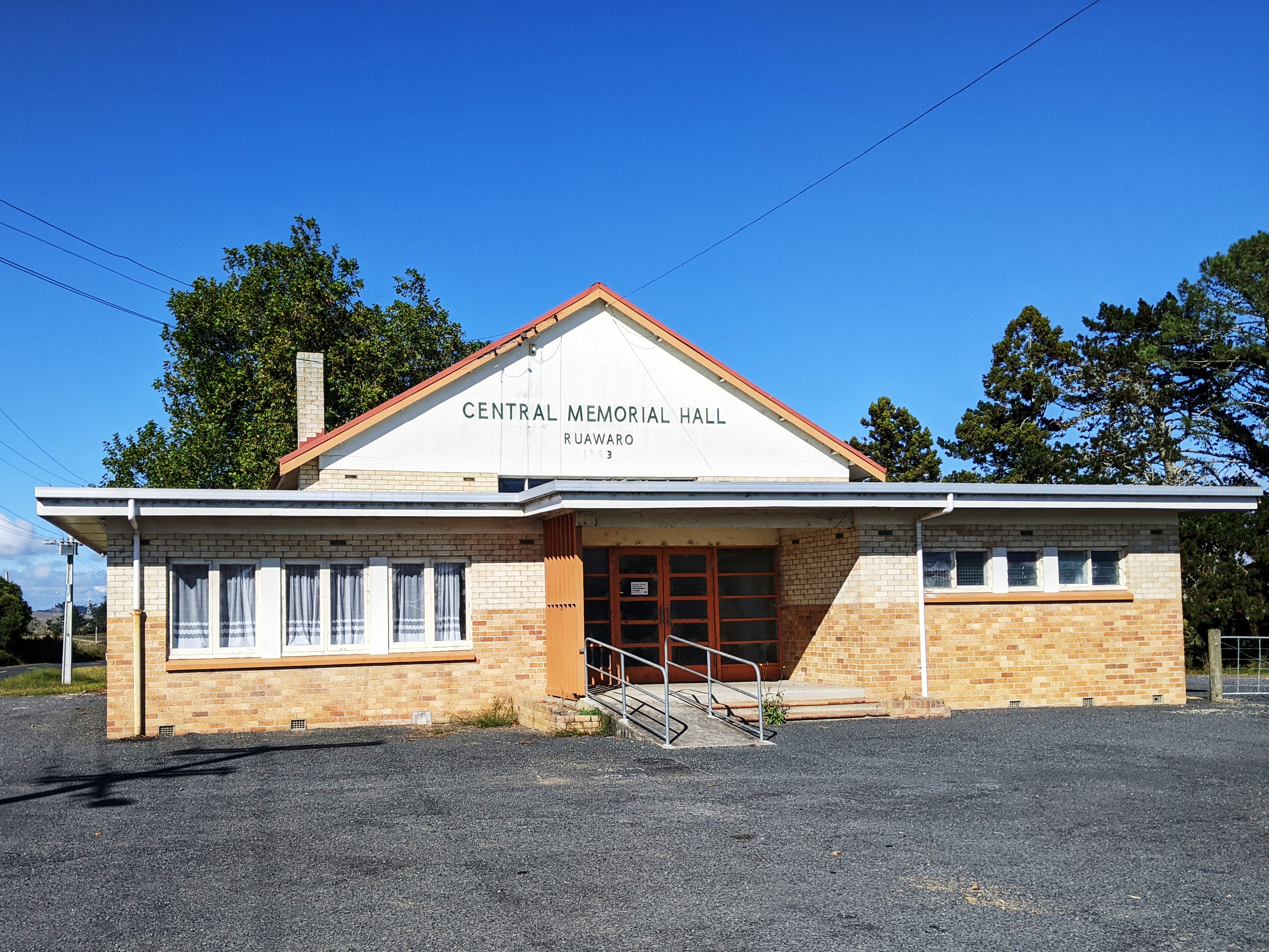
- Ruawaro Central Memorial Hall
- Interactive map of Ruawaro
- Coordinates: 37.527937°S 175.040822°E
- Country: New Zealand
- Region: Waikato
- District: Waikato District
- Ward: Western Districts General Ward; Tai Raro Takiwaa Maaori Ward
- Electorates: Port Waikato; Waikato; Hauraki-Waikato (Māori)

Government
  - Territorial Authority: Waikato District Council
  - Regional council: Waikato Regional Council
  - Mayor of Waikato: Aksel Bech
  - Port Waikato and Waikato MPs: Andrew Bayly and Tim van de Molen
  - Hauraki-Waikato MP: Hana-Rawhiti Maipi-Clarke

Area
  - Total: 90.10 km^{2} (34.79 sq mi)

Population (2023 census)
  - Total: 336
  - Density: 3.73/km^{2} (9.66/sq mi)
- Postcode(s): 3772

Ruawaro is a rural community in the Waikato District and Waikato region of New Zealand's North Island, situated south of Lake Whangape and west of Huntly.

The location of the 1933 Lakey murders and the childhood home of Topp Twins are both located in the area.

Ruawaro's Central Memorial Hall is a brick hall opened in 1953, built as a Second World War memorial for the small mining and farming settlements of Rotongaro, Ruawaro, Pukekapia and Waikokowai. It features a wooden table commemorating those who served, and a bronze plaque commemorating the eight local men were killed in action during the war.

As of 2017, Puketotara Station, a local intensive beef and lamb finishing farm, is owned by an equity firm.

== Demographics ==
Ruawaro covers 96.10 km^{2} (37.10 sq mi). It spans parts of the larger Huntly Rural and Te Ākau statistical areas.

Historical population
Year	Pop.	±% p.a.
2006	309	—
2013	297	−0.56%
2018	306	+0.60%
2023	336	+1.89%

Ruawaro had a population of 336 in the 2023 New Zealand census, an increase of 30 people (9.8%) since the 2018 census, and an increase of 39 people (13.1%) since the 2013 census. There were 171 males and 159 females in 132 dwellings. 0.9% of people identified as LGBTIQ+. There were 75 people (22.3%) aged under 15 years, 54 (16.1%) aged 15 to 29, 165 (49.1%) aged 30 to 64, and 39 (11.6%) aged 65 or older.

People could identify as more than one ethnicity. The results were 91.1% European (Pākehā), 11.6% Māori, 4.5% Pasifika, 1.8% Asian, and 3.6% other, which includes people giving their ethnicity as "New Zealander". English was spoken by 97.3%, Māori language by 4.5%, and other languages by 4.5%. No language could be spoken by 0.9% (e.g. too young to talk). The percentage of people born overseas was 9.8, compared with 28.8% nationally.

Religious affiliations were 28.6% Christian, and 0.9% other religions. People who answered that they had no religion were 58.9%, and 9.8% of people did not answer the census question.

Of those at least 15 years old, 36 (13.8%) people had a bachelor's or higher degree, 156 (59.8%) had a post-high school certificate or diploma, and 57 (21.8%) people exclusively held high school qualifications. 18 people (6.9%) earned over $100,000 compared to 12.1% nationally. The employment status of those at least 15 was that 153 (58.6%) people were employed full-time, 39 (14.9%) were part-time, and 3 (1.1%) were unemployed.

== History ==
=== Lakey murders ===
Ruawaro attracted national media attention when local couple Samuel and Christobel Lakey were murdered on their Ruawaro farm on Sunday 15 October 1933. Christobel's body was found by neighbours who were investigating why the couple's cows hadn't been milked.

An intensive and high-profile homicide investigation using ground-breaking forensic science led to neighbour William Alfred Bayly being convicted and hanged for the crime.

Bayly had been farming in Ruawaro since November 1928. To some locals, he was a "handsome dare-devil fellow" with a "magnetic" personality. To others, he was a scary and arrogant man who rode around the area on his horse.

Samuel Lakey had purchased the neighbouring property from Bayly's father, who he had worked for as a carpenter. Relations were initially friendly, but soured when Christobel Lakey was said to have accused Bayly of having murdered his niece.

Samuel Lakey's remains were finally reunited with this wife's remains at Huntly Cemetery at a ceremony in 2015, attended by the granddaughter of one of the neighbours.

=== Topp Twins ===
The Topp Twins were raised on a local dairy farm and attended Ruawaro Combined School during the 1960s and early 1970s. They left home and moved to Christchurch in 1975, at the age of 17. Staff and students at the school compiled memorabilia from their time at the school when they returned during the 1990s.

The Topp Twins: Untouchable Girls, a 2009 documentary feature film about the sisters directed by Leanne Pooley, covers their often difficult childhood in the deeply conservative rural community. The film screened at film festivals around the world, and won awards at the Toronto International Film Festival, Melbourne International Film Festival, Göteborg International Film Festival, Portland International Film Festival and the 2009 New Zealand Film and Television Awards.

== Education ==
Ruawaro Combined School is a co-educational state primary school, with a roll of 23 as of July 2026.
