= Lynda Topp =

Member of the Topp Twins in New Zealand

Dame Lynda Topp DNZM
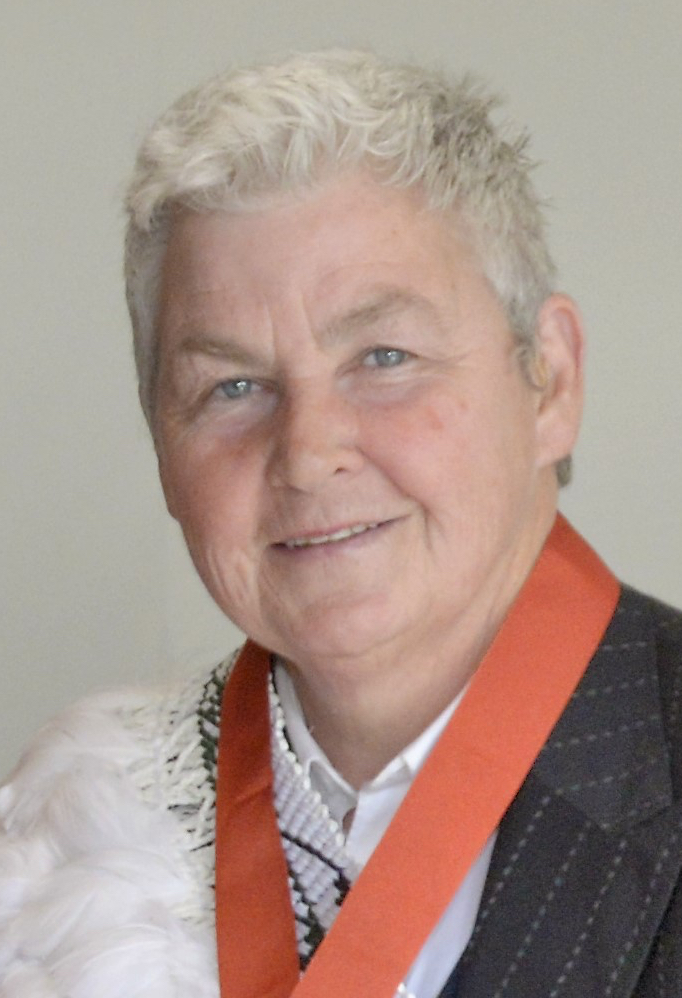
- Topp in 2018
- Born: Lynda Bethridge Topp; 14 May 1958 (age 68); Huntly, New Zealand
- Occupation: Entertainer
- Years active: 1975–present
- Known for: Topp Twins musical duo Lesbian activism
- Relatives: Jools Topp (sister)

Dame Lynda Bethridge Topp DNZM (born 14 May 1958) is a New Zealand entertainer. She was one half of the Topp Twins, a music comedy duo; the other member was her now deceased twin sister Jools Topp. With her sister, she became one of New Zealand's best-known entertainers through live performances, television and film over several decades. They combined country and folk music, comedy, and political activism, and performed as original characters including Ken & Ken and Camp Mother and Camp Leader. The sisters were both appointed Dames Companion of the New Zealand Order of Merit in the 2018 Queen's Birthday Honours.

The twins started their career busking in Christchurch and Auckland during the 1970s and performed at protests and public events relating to issues including women's rights, homosexual law reform, Māori land rights and opposition to the 1981 Springbok tour. They appeared in numerous television shows and were the subjects of the 2009 documentary film The Topp Twins: Untouchable Girls. They co-authored several books including their memoirs in 2003 and 2023; the latter won an award for being the best-selling New Zealand book in 2024.

== Background and personal life ==
On 14 May 1958, Jean Topp gave birth to twin sisters Lynda and Jools in Huntly, New Zealand. They have an older brother Bruce and their father is Peter. Lynda Topp grew up with her family on a dairy farm in Waikato. Topp attended Ruawaro Combined School during the 1960s and early 1970s. Lynda and Jools started singing together for other people when they were five years old. When they were nine, their brother bought them a guitar with money he had saved up.

After leaving Huntly College in 1976, Jools and Lynda Topp joined the New Zealand Territorial Force and were posted at the Burnham Military Camp near Christchurch for six weeks. When they were 17, they performed at the Victorian Coffee Lounge (Montreal Street, Christchurch Central City). This brought them into contact with radical lesbian feminists. They both started identifying as lesbian from the late 1970s. Much of their life has been in the public eye and their mother was interviewed by Radio New Zealand about the closure of the Women's Weekly magazine in 2020 talking about how much her children had been featured in these magazines.

Lynda enjoys hunting and fly fishing, which is why she chose to live in the South Island of New Zealand. Lynda has done many things in addition to being an entertainer, including running a café with her partner Donna in Methven, Canterbury. In March 2013, Lynda married her long-time partner Donna Luxton, a preschool teacher. At the time, as same-sex marriage was not legal in New Zealand, the couple entered into a civil union as a substitute. Same-sex marriage was made legal in New Zealand just a few months after.

On the birth of a new generation, with Lynda being a grandparent and Jools being a great aunt, they admitted they did not expect it when they were younger because as they said: "We're all gay", referring also to their brother. Both Lynda and Jools Topp use their celebrity status with humour to inform people of issues such as feminism, Māori land rights, homosexual law reform and New Zealand becoming a nuclear-free zone. They have been recognised by the LGBT community as being inspirational.

=== Marriage (Definition of Marriage) Amendment Bill ===
Before the third reading of the Marriage (Definition of Marriage) Amendment Bill, which ultimately passed and legalised same-sex marriage in New Zealand, the Topp Twins publicly endorsed the bill in a post on their website. In a statement, Lynda said:

Everybody should be able to stand up and say "I'm getting married". A Civil Union is demeaning, this idea that you will never be good enough, that your love is somehow less than or not as worthy. There's no romance to it. And today, I feel more romantic and more in love than I've ever felt in my life.

=== Breast cancer ===
In March 2022 Lynda and Jools revealed that they had both been diagnosed with breast cancer in 2021.

=== Local politics ===
Topp ran for election to the Ashburton District Council Western Ward in the 2022 local elections. She was unsuccessful, coming third with 777 votes.

== Career ==
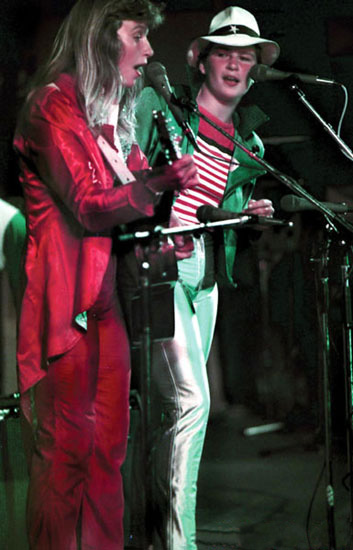
The Topp Twins in 1981

Lynda Topp along with her sister Jools has had a long career in entertainment in New Zealand. They sing country and folk music with harmonies often to raise people's social consciousness. As entertainers Lynda Topp leads the comedy and "works the audience", and mostly Jools plays the guitar and leads the song making. Lynda focused on yodelling. The Topp Twins' popularity arose from a regular stint busking in Auckland when they were in their early 20s. They got taken to court for causing obstruction on Queen Street because their crowd was too big. They won the case and benefited from the publicity. Soon after that they travelled and performed to university crowds around New Zealand. They are well known for their costumed comedic characters such as Ken & Ken, and Camp Leader and Camp Mother. They have been a lot on TV in character including in 2000 hosting a quiz show called Mr and Mrs, in which couples answered questions about how well they knew each other, and a 2014 to 2016 cooking show called Topp Country.

== Awards ==
- 1987 Listener Film and Television Awards. Best Entertainer: Topp Twins
- 1987 Listener Film and Television Awards. Best Entertainment Programme: Topp Twins Special
- 1987 Listener Film and Television Awards. Best Original Music: Topp Twins Special
- 1997 TV Guide Television Awards. Best Performance in an Entertainment Programme (shared with Lynda Topp): for Topp Twins, Do Not Adjust Your Twinset, episode 2
- 2004 New Zealand Order of Merit. (Shared with Lynda Topp) For Services to Entertainment
- 2009 Melbourne Film Festival. Audience Award for Documentary: The Topp Twins: Untouchable Girls
- 2009 Qantas Film and Television Awards. Best Feature Film – Under $1 Million: The Topp Twins: Untouchable Girls
- 2009 Qantas Film and Television Awards. Original Music (shared with Lynda Topp): for The Topp Twins: Untouchable Girls
- 2009 Toronto International Film Festival. Audience Award for Documentary: The Topp Twins: Untouchable Girls
- 2010 Brattleboro Film Festival (United States). Best of Festival Award: The Topp Twins: Untouchable Girls
- 2010 FIFO Oceanian International Documentary Film Festival (Tahiti). Special Jury Award: The Topp Twins: Untouchable Girls
- 2010 Gothenburg International Film Festival (Sweden). Audience Dragon Award for Best Feature Film: The Topp Twins: Untouchable Girls
- 2010 Portland International Film Festival. Best Feature Documentary: The Topp Twins: Untouchable Girls
- 2010 Qantas Film and Television Awards. Best Entertainment Programme: The Topp Twins and The APO
- 2017 New Zealand Television Awards. Best Presenter – Entertainment (shared with Lynda Topp): for Topp Country, season two
- 2018 Dame Companion of the New Zealand Order of Merit for services to entertainment
- 2019 Lifetime Achievement Award at the NEXT Woman of the Year Awards

=== Aotearoa Music Awards ===
The Aotearoa Music Awards (previously known as New Zealand Music Awards (NZMA)) are an annual awards night celebrating excellence in New Zealand music and have been presented annually since 1965.

Year	Nominee / work	Award	Result	Ref.
2008	Lynda Topp (as part of Topp Twins)	New Zealand Music Hall of Fame	inductee	

== Screenography ==
- Give us a clue. 2021, As: Ken – Television
- Wellington Paranormal – Covid-19. 2020, As: Mrs O'Leary – Web
- Funny As: The Story of New Zealand Comedy. 2019, Subject – Television
- Funny As: The Story of New Zealand Comedy (series promo). 2019, Subject – Television
- Wellington Paranormal. 2019–2021, As: Officer O'Leary's Mum – Television
- Poi E: The Story of Our Song. 2016, Subject – Film
- Topp Country. 2014 – 2016, Presenter – Television
- The Topp Twins and the APO. 2010, Presenter, Presenter – Television
- The Topp Twins: – Untouchable Girls. 2009, Subject – Film
- Ken's Hunting and Fishing Show. 2007, Director, As: Ken Moller – Television
- Ken's Hunting and Fishing Show – Tongariro. 2007, As: Ken Moller, Director – Television
- The Adventures of Roman Pilgrim. 2005, As: One of the Fates – Short Film
- Mr and Mrs. 2000, Presenter – Television
- In Search of the Lonesome Yodel. 2000, Presenter – Television
- The Topp Twins – Highland Games. 2000, Performer, Writer, Producer – Television
- The Topp Twins – Speedway. 1998, Performer, Writer, Producer – Television
- 1998 Hero Parade. 1998, Subject – Television
- Destination Planet Earth. 1997 – 1998, Subject – Television
- Highwater. 1997, As: Marge – Television
- The Topp Twins. 1996 – 2000, Writer, Musician, Producer – Television
- The Topp Twins – The Beach. 1996, Performer, Writer, Producer – Television
- The Topp Twins: Do Not Adjust Your Twinset. 1996, Presenter – Television
- Beyond a Joke!. 1995, Subject – Television
- The People Next Door. 1994, Subject – Television
- Camping Out with the Topp Twins. 1993, Musician – Television
- Rivers of NZ. 1992, Subject – Television
- Great New Zealand River Journeys. 1991, Presenter – Television
- Topp Twins TV Special. 1986, Musician
- That's Country. 1980 – 1984, Performer – Television

== Books ==
- Topp, Jools; Topp, Lynda (2023). Untouchable Girls: The Topp Twins' Story (1st ed.). Sydney: Allen & Unwin. ISBN 9781991006387.
- 2018 Topp Country: A Culinary Journey Through New Zealand with the Topp Twins by Jools Topp and Linda Topp ISBN 9780473442972 Hardcover (New Zealand)

She has also released five best-selling children’s audio books.

== Discography ==
The Topp Twins have released a number of vinyls, tapes, and CDs.
