= Huntly College =

School in New Zealand

Location
- Bridge Street, Huntly, New Zealand; 37.5623°S 175.1528°E

Information
- Type: State, Co-educational, Secondary Years 9–13
- Motto: Māori: Ma te pono ka watea "The truth shall set you free"
- Established: 1953
- Ministry of Education Institution no.: 119
- Principal: Rachael Parker
- Enrolment: 200 (July 2026)
- Socio-economic decile: 1B
- Website: huntlycollege.school.nz

Huntly College is a state-owned school located in the Waikato, New Zealand town of Huntly.

The wide variety of programmes available recognises the differing abilities and needs of those attending the school, and ensures that all students have the chance to succeed at their own level and in their chosen field.

Huntly College is a small school, with a current roll of approximately 350 students. The roll peaked in the early 1980s with student numbers at that time in excess of 800. This number was associated with the development of the Huntly Power Station and the operation of several state-owned coal mines. By 1991 the roll had dropped to around 500 students, and has continued to decline. The small nature of the current roll allows the school to offer small class sizes. The ages range from Year 9 – Year 13.

The area is home to its original inhabitants, the Tainui people, to whom the Waikato River and Taupiri Mountain are sacred. Huntly College roll is 72% Māori. Students participate in camps, trips, extra curricular activities (drama, dance, kapa haka) and a range of sports. Huntly College is close to two major New Zealand cities, Hamilton 35 km to the south and Auckland, New Zealand's largest city (population of over one million), is approximately 90 km north. The college is also less than one hour's drive to either the west or east coasts.

The school's motto, "ma te pono ka watea", is a Māori translation of "the truth shall set you free".

Rachael Parker became principal in 2023.

== Enrolment ==
As of July 2026, Huntly College has a roll of 200 students, of which 149 (74.5%) identify as Māori.

As of 2026, the school has an Equity Index of 552, placing it amongst schools whose students have the most socioeconomic barriers to achievement (roughly equivalent to deciles 1 and 2 under the former socio-economic decile system).

== Notable alumni ==
- Percy Tetzlaff – rugby union player
- Martin Moana – rugby league player
- Jools Topp – entertainer
- Lynda Topp – entertainer
