= Humphrey Ikin =

New Zealand furniture designer

Humphrey John Ikin (born 7 May 1957) is a New Zealand furniture designer.

== Early life and family ==
Born in Lower Hutt on 7 May 1957, Ikin was educated at King's College in Auckland, before going on to study at Massey University from 1975 to 1977, and the University of Auckland in 1981.

In 1979, Ikin married Philippa Anne Malden.

== Furniture design ==
Ikin's furniture is known for its design quality and Pacific minimalist look. In 1998, New York's I.D. Magazine listed him as one of the top 40 designers in the world and featured his piece Red Stave Chair alongside work by well-known designers Jasper Morrison (England), Philippe Starck (France), and Antonio Citterio. In 2001 he won the prestigious John Britten Design Award, presented annually by the Designers' Institute of New Zealand. In 2003 he received an Arts Foundation of New Zealand Laureate Award.

Ikin's work is held in both public and private collections in New Zealand and throughout the world. He teaches part-time at Unitec New Zealand in Auckland where, in 2002 he was appointed Adjunct Professor of Furniture Design at the School of Design.

In 1997, he co-curated with Carin Wilson a major exhibition of furniture at the Dowse Art Museum in Lower Hutt. Entitled Framed, the exhibition displayed the work of 23 studio furniture makers, ranging from young designers to experienced practitioners.

== Exhibitions ==
- 1987 - Solo Exhibition, Janne Land Gallery, Wellington
- 1990 - Solo Exhibition, Fisher Gallery, Auckland
- 1991 - Solo Exhibition, RKS ART, Auckland
- 1994 - Solo Exhibitions, RKS ART, Auckland
- 1994 - Room, Solo Exhibition, Dowse Art Museum, Lower Hutt
- 1997 - Facing North, Solo Exhibition, City Gallery, Wellington and the Auckland Museum (1998)

== List of works ==
- Works from the collection of the Museum of New Zealand Te Papa Tongarewa
