= Percy Tetzlaff =

- Born: Percy Laurence Tetzlaff; 14 July 1920 Taupiri, New Zealand
- Died: 30 August 2009 (aged 89) Auckland, New Zealand
- Height: 1.60 m (5 ft 3 in)
- Weight: 68 kg (150 lb)
- School: Huntly District High School

Rugby union career
- Position: Halfback
Provincial / State sides
Years	Team	Apps	(Points)
1939	Waikato	4	
1940–47	Auckland		
International career
Years	Team	Apps	(Points)
1947	New Zealand	2	(0)

Percy Laurence Tetzlaff (14 July 1920 – 30 August 2009) was a New Zealand rugby union player. A halfback, Tetzlaff represented Waikato and Auckland at a provincial level, and was a member of the New Zealand national side, the All Blacks, on their 1947 tour of Australia. He played seven matches for the All Blacks on that tour, including two internationals.

He was selected as one of the 5 players of the year for the 1945 season in the Rugby Almananac of New Zealand.

At 1.60 m, Tetzlaff was one of the shortest All Blacks ever.
