= William Alfred Bayly =

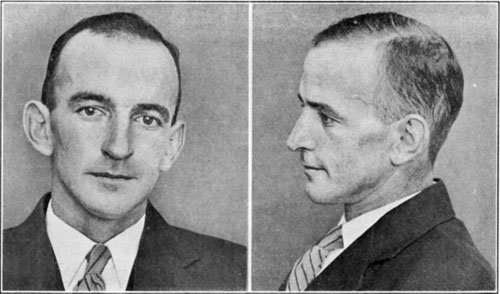
- Bayly in 1933
- Born: 15 July 1906; Auckland, New Zealand
- Died: 20 July 1934 (aged 28); Mount Eden Prison, Auckland, New Zealand
- Occupation: Dairy farmer
- Spouse: Phyllis Bayly
- Children: 2
- Status: Executed by hanging
- Conviction: Murder
- Penalty: Death

William Alfred Bayly (15 July 1906 – 20 July 1934) was a New Zealand farmer and convicted murderer. He was born in Auckland, New Zealand, on 15 July 1906.

In October 1928, Bayly's cousin, 17-year-old Elsie Walker, was found dead in some scrub in a scoria pit in Panmure, Auckland, with a bruise on her head. Bayly was suspected of killing her, but he was never charged.

Bill Bayly and his wife Phyllis had been dairy farming at Ruawaro, near Huntly, since November 1928. Their neighbours were Samuel and Christobel Lakey. Relations between Bill Bayly and the Lakeys were initially friendly, but soured when Mrs Lakey was said to have accused Bayly of having murdered his niece.

On 16 October 1933 neighbours were concerned as to why the Lakey's cows had not been milked that morning. Christobel was discovered lying face down in her pond next to the farmhouse. She had been struck a blow to the face then held down underwater until she drowned. Her husband was missing. Some speculated that her husband had killed her and fled, but it soon became evident that both Lakeys had been the victims of foul play. Two days later bloodstains were found on a wheeled frame near the boundary between the Lakey and Bayly farms, bloodstains were discovered on Bill's sledge, Lakey's guns were found buried in Bayly's swamp, and chemical tests revealed charred bone fragments on a shovel taken from his dairy.

In December Bayly, who had been under surveillance by the police, disappeared, leaving a suicide note. He soon surfaced in Auckland, and was arrested for the murder of Christobel Lakey. More evidence was found in Bayly's garden. Bayly had attempted to incinerate all traces of Lakey. On 10 January 1934, Bayly was charged with Samuel Lakey's murder.

Bayly was hanged in Mount Eden Prison, Auckland, on 20 July 1934. He was survived by his wife and two young sons.

Police finally buried the remains of Samuel Lakey alongside those of Christobel in Huntly cemetery in 2015. His remains had been used for forensic training.

== See also ==
- Capital punishment in New Zealand
- List of people executed in New Zealand
