= Topp Twins =

New Zealand folk singers, comedians, and activists (born 1958)

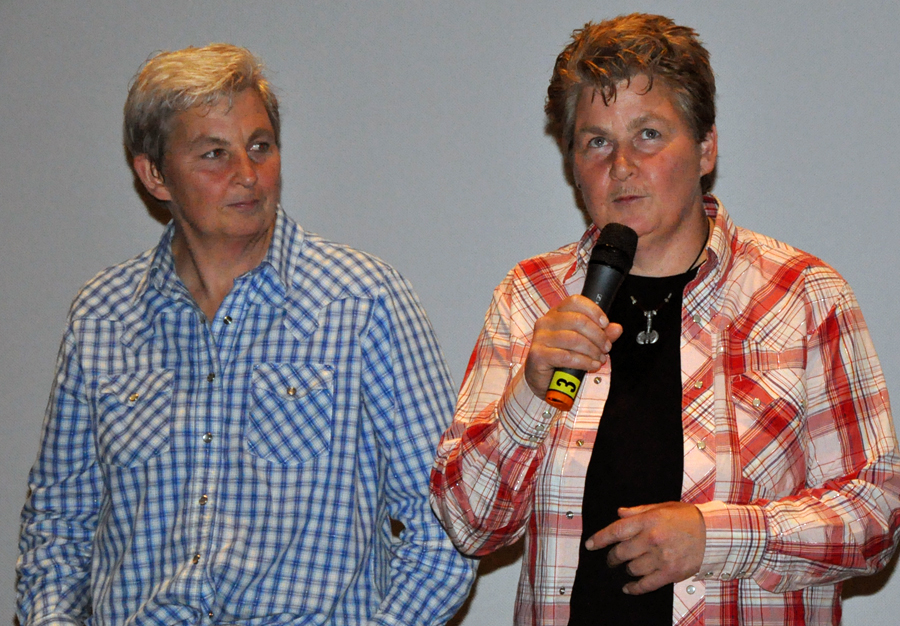
- Jools and Lynda Topp at a screening of Untouchable Girls in September 2009

Background information
- Born: 14 May 1958 (age 68); Huntly, New Zealand
- Died: 23 May 2026 (aged 68) (Jools)
- Genres: Comedy, country, folk, yodeling
- Years active: 1981–2026
- Members: Dame Julie Bethridge Topp; Dame Lynda Bethridge Topp
- Website: The Topp Twins Official Website

The Topp Twins (born 14 May 1958) were the folk singing and activist sister comedy duo of New Zealand entertainers Jools and Lynda Topp. They were known for their country music influenced style, live shows and television performances. They often performed as characters, the most notable being the roles Ken & Ken, and Camp Mother & Camp Leader.

== Career ==
The Topp Twins have performed as a country music-singing comedy duo since the 1970s. They started singing together and performing when they were children. Busking in Auckland on Queen Street in the 1980s was formative to their dynamic as entertainers with a regular Friday night appearance. They were singing political songs of protest, about topics such as Māori land rights at Bastion Point and Nuclear Free New Zealand. Both have been openly lesbian since the 1970s, and were advocates for homosexual law reform.

Being out lesbians in the early 80s singing country music through comedic characters the Gingham Sisters was probably one of the most diverse combinations of political comedy in the world... (Jools and Linda Topp 2022)

The Topp Twins developed characters for the banter and audience interaction around their music. As Jools said: "We made ourselves look ridiculous ... we asked them to laugh at us, not to laugh at someone else's misfortune." In 2019 arts centre Expressions in Upper Hutt hosted an exhibition on the Topp Twins created by Te Manawa Museum in Palmerston North. Expressions director Leanne Wickham describes the appeal of the Topp Twins:

"They are able to draw people into their music and talk about the issues that are important to us using humour – whether it is Bastion Pt, the Springbok Tour or climate change."

=== Television ===
In the late 1990s, they created their own TV series, Do Not Adjust Your Twinset, which ran for three seasons and showcased their iconic cast of New Zealand characters, including Camp Mother & Camp Leader, the Bowling Ladies and Ken & Ken, roles for which they cross-dressed as 'typical kiwi blokes'. The series won the twins several awards at the New Zealand Film and Television Awards and screened on the ABC and Foxtel networks in Australia. They have appeared on numerous specials and as guests. A cooking show called Topp Country ran over three seasons from 2014 to 2016.

=== Film ===
A documentary feature film about the sisters titled The Topp Twins: Untouchable Girls, directed by Leanne Pooley, was released in April 2009. It broke all previous records for opening day, and opening weekend, for a New Zealand documentary. After just four weeks at the box office, it made over $1 million. As of 2011, it has made over $1.82 million in worldwide box office sales. The movie was produced by Arani Cuthbert. The cinematographer was Leon Narbey. It was well received and has been shown at numerous film festivals worldwide, winning awards at the Toronto International Film Festival, Melbourne International Film Festival, Göteborg International Film Festival, Portland International Film Festival and the 2009 New Zealand Film and Television Awards.

Untouchable Girls is the title of a song by the Topp Twins about standing up for what you believe in.

=== Memoir ===
In 2023, the Twins' memoir titled Untouchable Girls: The Topp Twins' Story was published in New Zealand. In a television interview with The Project NZ, they said they used the downtime forced upon them by the COVID-19 pandemic and their respective cancer treatments to write the memoir.

== Personal lives ==
Both Jools and Lynda are openly lesbian. In March 2013, Lynda married her long-time partner Donna Luxton, a preschool teacher. At the time of their marriage, same-sex marriage was not legal in New Zealand, so the couple entered into a civil union as a substitute for marriage. Same-sex marriage was made legal in New Zealand just a few months after the wedding.

Before the third reading of the Marriage (Definition of Marriage) Amendment Bill, which ultimately passed and legalised same-sex marriage in New Zealand, the Topp Twins publicly endorsed the bill in a post on their website. In a statement, Lynda said, "Everybody should be able to stand up and say 'I'm getting married'. A Civil Union is demeaning, this idea that you will never be good enough, that your love is somehow less than or not as worthy. There's no romance to it. And today, I feel more romantic and more in love than I've ever felt in my life."

=== Breast cancer ===
In 2006, Jools was diagnosed with breast cancer and underwent treatment including mastectomy. From this experience the sisters incorporated Jool's personal story of treatment and recovery into a Topp Twins stage show that toured New Zealand including raising funds for the New Zealand Breast Cancer Foundation. She and her sister Lynda were already breast cancer activists and continued to use their celebrity status to educate the public about the disease.

In 2022, it was revealed that Lynda and Jools had both been battling breast cancer since 2021, but decided to receive separate treatments to prevent contracting COVID-19.

Jools died on 23 May 2026, after a 22-year "journey with breast cancer". The day before Jools died, the twins were awarded the Country Music Honour for Contribution to Country Music, "in recognition of their longstanding impact on the industry".

== Recognition and awards ==
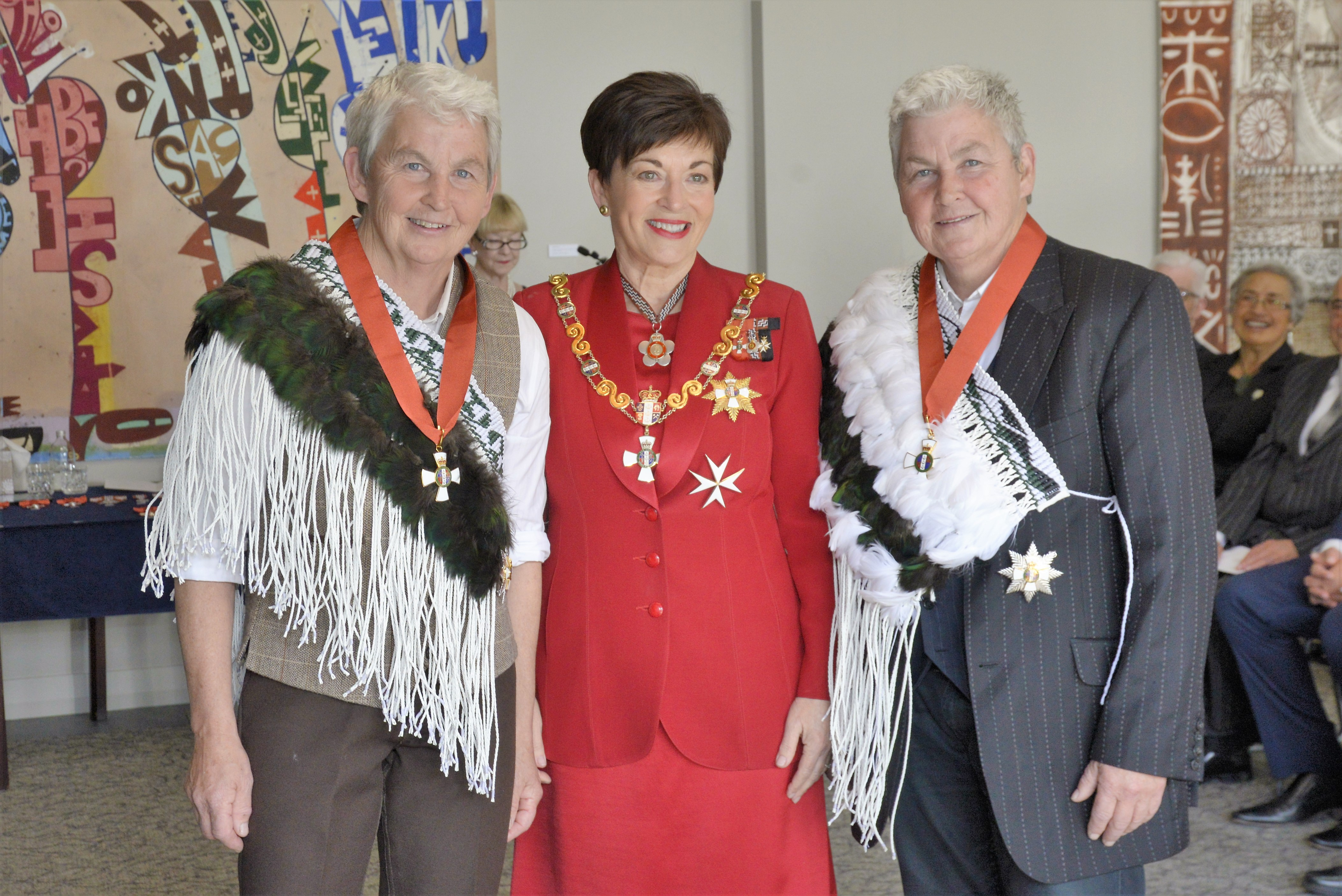
Jools Topp (left) and Lynda Topp (right) in October 2018, after their investitures as Dames Companion of the New Zealand Order of Merit, for services to entertainment, by the governor-general, Dame Patsy Reddy

In 1984, the Topp Twins were named NZOA Group of the Year. The sisters were made Members of the New Zealand Order of Merit (MNZM) in 2004.

They were presented with the Rielly Comedy Award from the Variety Artists Club of New Zealand in 2009.

In 2010, Wintec awarded the twins honorary masters degrees. In 2011, Waikato University awarded them honorary doctorates.

2010 Qantas Film and Television Awards – Best Entertainment Programme: The Topp Twins and The APO

2017 New Zealand Television Awards – Best Presenter – Entertainment (shared between Lynda and Jools Topp): for Topp Country, season two.

In the 2018 Queen's Birthday Honours, both Lynda and Jools Topp were appointed Dames Companion of the New Zealand Order of Merit, for services to entertainment.

In 2019, the twins jointly won a Lifetime Achievement award in the NEXT Woman of the Year awards.

A tribute concert for their 40th year was staged at Auckland's Civic Theatre in November 2022. This featured many New Zealand artists including Tami Neilson, Anika Moa, Ria Hall, Hinewehi Mohi, Troy Kingi, Jackie Clarke and Annie Crummer. Don McGlashan and Harry Sinclair of The Front Lawn performed on-stage together, the first time in 31 years last performing in 1991 in a double bill with The Topp Twins.

The Topp Prize is an annual prize named after the Topp Twins awarded by The New Zealand Comedy Trust to a "practicing individual, duo or group with a strong, clear and unique voice". It started in 2022. Inaugural winner Chris Parker expressed he idolized the Topp Twins and said:

A performer like myself is a product of the work, advocacy and representation that they've put out into the world with such positivity and respect for Aotearoa. (Chris Parker 2022)

The Twins received an Arts Foundation of New Zealand Te Tumu Toi Icon Award in 2026.

=== Aotearoa Music Awards ===
The Aotearoa Music Awards (previously known as New Zealand Music Awards (NZMA)) are an annual awards night celebrating excellence in New Zealand music and have been presented annually since 1965.

Year	Nominee / work	Award	Result	Ref.
2008	Topp Twins	New Zealand Music Hall of Fame	inductee	

== Discography ==
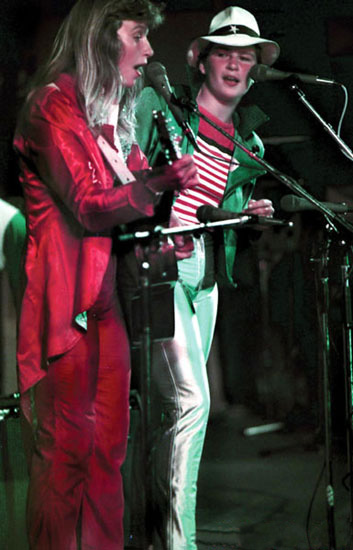
The Topp Twins performing in 1981

=== Studio albums ===
List of studio albums
Title	Extended play details
No War in My Heart	Released: 1986; Label: Festival Records (C 29029); Formats: Cassette
Two Timing	Released: 1994; Label: Topp Twins (TT001); Formats: CD
Grass Highway	Released: 2001; Label: Topp Twins (TT002); Formats: CD
Flowergirls & Cowgirls	Released: 2005; Label: Topp Twins (TT003); Formats: CD
Honky Tonk Angel	Released: 2009; Label: Topp Twins Ltd. (D9833); Formats: CD

=== Compilation albums ===
List of compilation albums
Title	Extended play details
The Very Best of the Topp Twins	Released: 2014; Label: Topp Twins Ltd.; Formats: CD, Digital

=== Extended plays ===
List of EPS, with New Zealand chart positions
Title	Extended play details	Peak chart positions
Title	Extended play details	NZ
Go Vinyl	Released: 1982; Label: Dragons Egg (TT 001); Formats: LP	34
Twinset and Pearls	Released: December 1984; Label: Dragon's Egg, Mushroom (L 29021); Formats: LP, Cassette	46
Wear Something Sexy	Released: 1990; Label: Topp Twins; Formats: Cassette	–
Hightime	Released: 1992; Label: Topp Twins; Formats: Cassette	–
