= Miriam Tindall Smith =

American artist

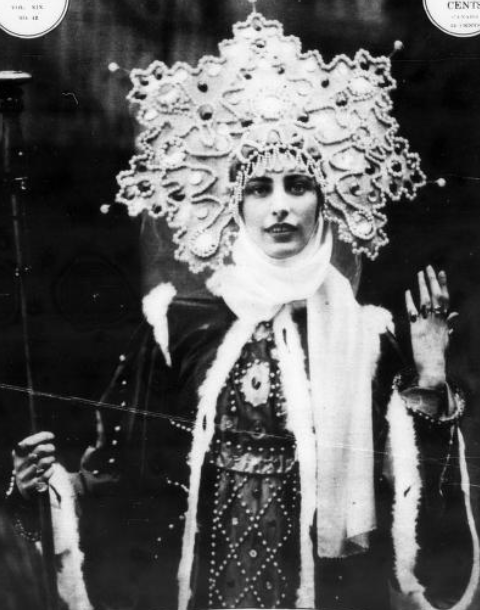
- Miriam Tindall in Russian-inspired costume for a student production, from a 1924 publication
- Born: Miriam Pauline Tindall; 1901; Norwood, Pennsylvania
- Died: January 13, 1973 (aged 71–72); Philadelphia, Pennsylvania
- Occupation: Artist

Miriam Pauline Tindall Smith (1901 – January 13, 1973) was an American artist, based in Philadelphia. She made paintings, murals, sculptures, and costume designs.

== Early life and education ==
Tindall was born in Norwood, Pennsylvania, the daughter of Alfred Ashton Tindall and Jennie Minerva Baltz Tindall. Her father worked for the railroad. She graduated from Chester High School in 1919, and trained as an artist at the Philadelphia Museum School of Industrial Arts, and with Arthur Beecher Carles.

== Career ==
Smith was a painter active mainly in Philadelphia in the 1930s and 1940s. She was known for her murals, including scenic murals inside the Empire State Express rail cars, and a mural for the 1939 New York World's Fair, depicting "the triumph of asbestos over the elements". Also in 1939, she finished a large mural depicting the Sermon on the Mount and other Gospel scenes, in the sanctuary of the Immanuel Lutheran Church in Norwood, as a memorial for her mother. She also designed theatrical costumes and masks. She worked for the Public Works Administration during the 1930s.

Smith and her husband were active in the alumni organization for the Pennsylvania Museum School of Industrial Art. In 1955, Smith had a solo show at the Allentown Art Museum.

== Personal life and legacy ==
Miriam Tindall married fellow artist William Singerly Smith in 1926. She died in 1973, in her seventies. In 2019, Immanuel Lutheran Church in Norwood held a celebration and re-dedication, marking the 80th anniversary of her mural there.
