= Sara Brodie =

New Zealand theatre director and choreographer

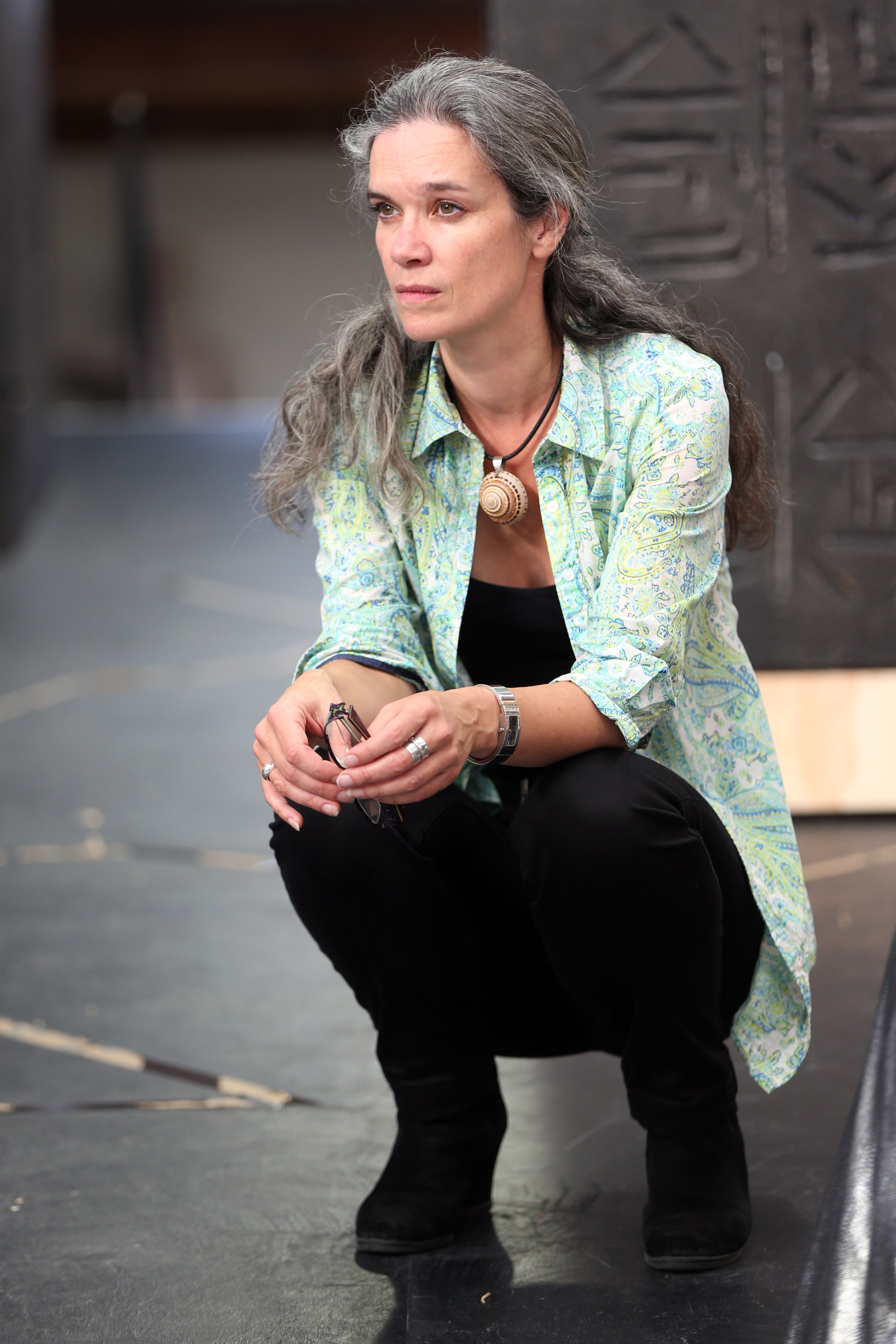
During the 2016 rehearsal of New Zealand Opera production of Mozart's Magic Flute

Sara Brodie (born 1970) is a New Zealand theatre director and choreographer.

== Biography ==
Brodie was born in Christchurch, New Zealand. She moved to London and spent seven years working there as an actress, dancer, casting director and behind the scenes before returning to New Zealand in 1996.

In 2000, Brodie completed a master's degree in theatre from Victoria University of Wellington, specialising in Laban movement analysis. She taught movement and acting in London and then returned to Wellington to work as head of acting at the Wellington Performing Arts Centre.

In 2019, Brodie was appointed production director for a newly formed opera company in Christchurch, Toi Toi Opera.
