= Carin Wilson =

New Zealand sculptor and furniture maker

Carin John Wilson (born 2 March 1945) is a New Zealand studio furniture maker, sculptor and design educator. He was a leader in the country's craft movement in the 1970s, 80s and 90s and was one of the inaugurators of the design showcase Artiture in 1987. He is a descendant of the Ngāti Awa ancestor Te Rangihouhiri and the founding chairman of Ngā Aho, a design initiative that advocates for collaborative and creative practices among professionals within the Māori tribal structure and community. The Whitecliffe College of Arts and Design conferred Wilson with an Honorary Diploma in Art and Design; in 2002 he received an inaugural Toi Iho mark, a registered Māori trademark of authenticity. His design practice, Studio Pasifika, has been in operation since 1993. Wilson is included in Helen Schamroth's 100 New Zealand Craft Artists, Douglas Lloyd Jenkins' At Home: A Century of New Zealand Design, and Michael Smythe's New Zealand by Design: a History of New Zealand Product Design.

== Background ==
Wilson's ancestry embraces both of New Zealand's founding cultures, Māori and European. His maternal grandparents were Italian, and his paternal grandfather, a Scot named Andrew Wilson, married Anahera Kingi. He was born and raised in the South Island and enrolled at Victoria University of Wellington in 1963 to study law. Soon bored with his legal studies, he found employment as a sales representative for a Māori publishing company, during which he trained in organisation and methods. Following a trip overseas where he indulged his fascination with art in the cathedrals and museums of Europe, he returned to his birthplace, Christchurch.

His woodworking occurred out of necessity when Wilson and his wife, Jenney, purchased a small cottage in the Heathcote Valley. The family needed furniture and Wilson adapted old kauri (Agathis australis) tubs, found on the property, into serviceable items. The involvement with wood was transformative:

One day I found an old gate under a hedge and I started cleaning back the timber underneath the weathering. As I peeled back those layers I saw something in the timber that I can only describe as its spiritual essence. So it was in every way a transforming experience for me. I’d made that connection with the wairua [spirit] of the timber and from then on I knew that I’d found a material that I connected with at a deep level. And that’s really the beginning. I started a process of learning the characteristics of the timber, of reading and teaching myself methods that I could use to work it.

Wilson tried to find an education programme that would complement his self-teaching but, at the time, Christchurch Polytechnic offered only carpentry courses. This absence in the availability of design/make training would have a subsequent influence on Wilson's agenda as president of the Crafts Council of New Zealand (CCNZ); in the meantime he honed his skills by doing. His first major exhibition was in 1974 at the Canterbury Building Centre: a buyer from McKenzie & Willis, the furniture retailer, purchased the entire inventory of occasional tables, shelf units and cupboards. As a consequence, Wilson established Adzmarc, rented a studio in the Artists Quarter in central Christchurch, hired employees, and made furniture in a rustic, textured style that was wholesaled to McKenzie & Willis for the next five years.

== Community connections ==
Seeing the need for woodworkers to come together for camaraderie and sharing techniques, Wilson instigated the Canterbury Guild of Woodworkers in 1978. This was the first of New Zealand's woodworking guilds. His networking put him in touch with members of the CCNZ and he became involved in the organisation at the national level as its southern regional representative. As the first furniture practitioner to sit on the executive of the CCNZ, he was able to bring woodworking to the attention of the membership; subsequently, furniture workshops, exhibitions and invitations to prominent international makers featured on the CCNZ's calendar and in its publications.

Wilson's awareness of the paucity of educational opportunities for designer/craftspeople prompted him to promote education as a significant mandate during his tenure as president of the CCNZ (1981–1983). In his first message as president he stated: "I am also keen to see greater participation by young people in the craft movement, and would hope that we can encourage school leavers to consider the crafts as providing a viable alternative to other employment, so that a proper master-student relationship can be encouraged with some of our experienced artists". In 1982 he was successful in applying to the Arts Council of New Zealand for a travel grant to enable him to visit art schools in the United States and Europe, to learn about curriculum and look at studio facilities so that New Zealand might inaugurate similar programmes. Wilson's report, as a consequence of this trip, for the Minister of the Arts, Allan Highet, was passed on to the Director-General of Education, William Renwick, thereby launching the process to establish the certificate and diploma programmes in craft design in polytechnics throughout the country in 1986 and 1987.

Wilson served on a number of boards: the executive board of the World Crafts Council (1984–87), Crafts Education Advisory Committee (1985–1988), the Designers Institute of New Zealand (council member 1991-93; president 1994), the Queen Elizabeth II Arts Council's arts marketing working party (1991–92), the New Zealand Qualifications Authority’s craft advisory panel (1992), and the New Zealand Craft Resource Trust (1997). Bodies like the Arts Marketing Board of Aotearoa (AMBA) and the Craft Resource Trust were established to address the vacuum that was left by the dissolution of the Crafts Council of New Zealand in 1992.

Following the demise of the CCNZ, Wilson concentrated on involvement in projects that tapped into his Māori heritage. Wilson was responsible, along with interior designer Chris van Ryn, for the interiors for the Māori Television Service's studios in 2004. Four years later, ongoing dedication to design education provoked Wilson's involvement with Ngā Aho. This association of design professionals aims to dispel "Euro-centrically biased" academic curricula. According to Wilson, "There was simply no call to examine whether there were relevant parallel practices within the indigenous culture that were just called something different." Wilson also collaborates with Rau Hoskins in teaching at Unitec Institute of Technology with assignments, like building shelters, that reflect the wisdom of indigenous materials and techniques.

== Furniture portfolio ==
In 1982, Wilson moved his family to Auckland to be closer to his Māori roots in Whakatāne. The relocation also brought him closer association with Auckland's design and art community. John Parker (ceramics) and Terry Stringer (sculpture) provided segues to exhibition opportunities, and once his studio was established in Mount Eden, he continued to be a prolific and accomplished furniture maker.

One of Wilson's major commissions was for the Queen Elizabeth II Arts Council headquarters in Wellington. In 1985 nine furniture makers were invited to submit designs for three projects: a boardroom table and sixteen chairs, furniture for the director's office, and furniture for the reception area and offices. After a two-stage selection process, Wilson was awarded the boardroom project. The brief for the table stated that it must be multi-purpose, accommodating both small and large meetings. The chairs were an adaptation of a design that the Department of Foreign Affairs commissioned from Wilson as New Zealand's gift to the new Republic of Vanuatu.

In addition to these precisely-crafted functional pieces, Wilson created alternative forms of furniture that explored narrative. These were exhibited at the annual 'Artiture' furniture exhibitions (1987-1993) in Auckland, where the participants aimed "to design furniture that was art, not constricted by the necessity of the pieces having to be a commercial proposition". The primary example in Wilson's Artiture oeuvre was Royal Pain in the Arse, a chair whose literal pointed humour made reference to the Crown. Also in the narrative vein, Lair for a Lounge Lizard, created for the Contemporary Furniture Show at the Auckland Museum in 1988, explored the new notion of the home office. Lair was not selected for display in the Contemporary Furniture Show, prompting Wilson and other rejected designers to stage a salon de refusés at the Gow Langsford Gallery. The publicity generated by the furore surrounding the Australian judge's selection contributed to the Auckland Museum exhibition and its alternative being noteworthy events in the history of New Zealand studio furniture. The works of a number of the exhibitors in the 1992 Artiture display at the Museum were purchased and selected to tour through five cities in Japan in 1993.

The last major exhibition of furniture in New Zealand took place at the Dowse Art Museum in Lower Hutt in 1997. Entitled Framed it was co-curated by Wilson and Humphrey Ikin. The display, consisting of the work of 23 studio furniture makers, was described by Ikin as "a slice through to highlight this cross-section: the work of younger designers who had not exhibited previously, alongside the not so young; experienced practitioners beside recent design graduates". Although there have been regional exhibitions and gallery shows dedicated to individual makers, Framed spelled the end of national visibility for studio furniture.

== Sculpture ==
During 1993-95 Wilson assisted with the compilation and presentation of evidence for Ngāti Awa's claim against the Crown through the Waitangi Tribunal, a commission of enquiry relating to actions or omissions of the Crown that breached the promises made in New Zealand's 1840 founding Treaty of Waitangi between Māori and the Crown. At the conclusion of the hearings Wilson began work on his first solo exhibition of sculpture, He Rahi to Whakamau kotahi i te Pirita, which translates as ‘to be entangled in the supplejack [a twisted vine Ripogonum scandens] once is sufficient.’ This statement is attributed to the prophetic figure Te Kooti as he reflected on his experience of dealing with the Crown during this period in New Zealand history. Sculpture exhibitions in 2003, 2005, and 2011 have continued to be inspired by Wilson's Māori heritage and personal philosophical and political views."The Fourth Perspective" at the Judith Anderson Gallery in Auckland in 2001 was a group show in which Wilson's table, made of pūriri and metal, retained the tunnels eaten by pūriri moths as symbolic of the beauty yet reality of nature. "I O E A U" at Artis Gallery in Auckland in 2003 transferred the marks made by Māori signatories to the Treaty of Waitangi, into three-dimensional forms in steel, wood glass and stone. "Re-patterning" (2011), that explored the relationships between the universe and the changes wrought by its human inhabitants, was described by Wilson: "If we re-pattern our behaviour and really look carefully at how we've got to re-engage with the systems that are a part of us, then we'd have some different outcomes."

Wilson is represented by Artis Gallery; his sculpture uses a variety of materials, making reference to landscape, environment and culture. His work is held in public and private collections nationally and internationally. His Pukeruru studio continues to pursue the principle, initiated in the 1980s, of the establishment of learning opportunities in the creative industries. The studio provides opportunities for short-term residencies and internships while encouraging a pragmatic approach to the importance of a sound business practice.
