= Miriam Smith (filmmaker) =

New Zealand filmmaker

Miriam Smith is a New Zealand filmmaker. Her films have twice won New Zealand Film Awards, in 2012 and 2017.

== Biography ==
Smith studied film and English at the University of Auckland, graduating with a master's degree in screenwriting. She later studied at Binger Filmlab in the Netherlands.

Smith is a co-director, with Christopher Pryor, of production company Deer Heart Films. In 2016 Smith and Pryor received the Harriet Friedlander Residency.

== Filmography ==
Year	Title	Genre	Role	Notes
2016	The Ground We Won	Documentary film	Writer and producer	Winner: 2016 Special Jury Prize at FIFO Tahiti Winner: 2017 New Zealand Film Award for Best Documentary
2012	How Far is Heaven	Documentary film	Co-director and producer	Winner: 2012 New Zealand Film Award for Best Documentary Cinematography
2010	Licked	Short film		
