= Seung Yul Oh =

New Zealand-Korean artist

- Born: 1981 (age 44–45); Seoul, South Korea
- Education: Elam School of Fine Arts
- Occupation: artist
- Writing career
- Notable awards: Harriet Friedlander Residency 2010, SEMA Nanji Residency 2013

Seung Yul Oh (Korean: 오승열) is a Korean New Zealand artist who is best known for his public art works around New Zealand.

== Biography ==
Oh was born in Seoul, South Korea in 1981. In 1997, at age 15, Oh moved to New Zealand alone and attended school as an international student. He later became a citizen and now works and resides between Seoul and Auckland.

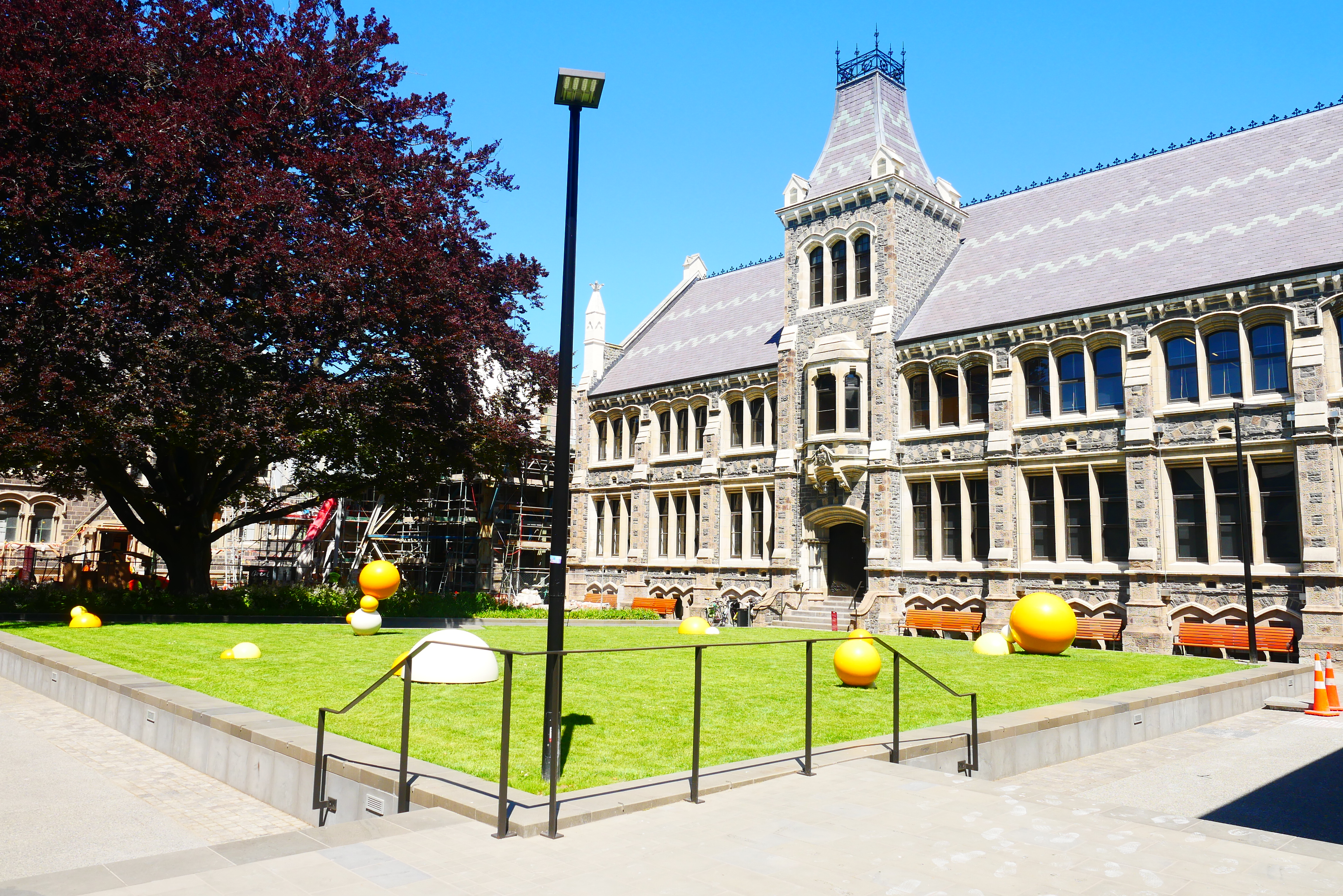
Conduct Cumulus at Arts Centre Te Matatiki Toi Ora, Christchurch.

In 2005, Oh completed an MFA at Auckland University's Elam School of Fine Arts. He is a multimedia artist who works across mediums such as sculpture, installation, video, painting and performance. His art practice has been noted to merge East Asian popular culture with Western art history through playful and whimsical elements that distort scale and at times invite participation.

Some of his notable public art works include; OnDo (2015-2021), a large pair of chopsticks holding noodles, which was located on the footpath of Auckland's Dominion Road. Conduct Cumulus (2017) outside The Arts Centre Te Matatiki Toi Ora in Christchurch. The sculpture, Upon a Pond (2017) located near the Albany Stadium Pool in Albany, Auckland. Which expels mist and invites people to climb it. As well as the works Cycloid I, II,III,IV,V, and VI as part of sculpture on the gulf on Matiatia Headland, Waiheke Island.

The Wellington Sculpture Trust has commissioned Oh to create a sculpture. Kimi / You Are Here will be installed in Waitangi Park in Wellington in 2025.

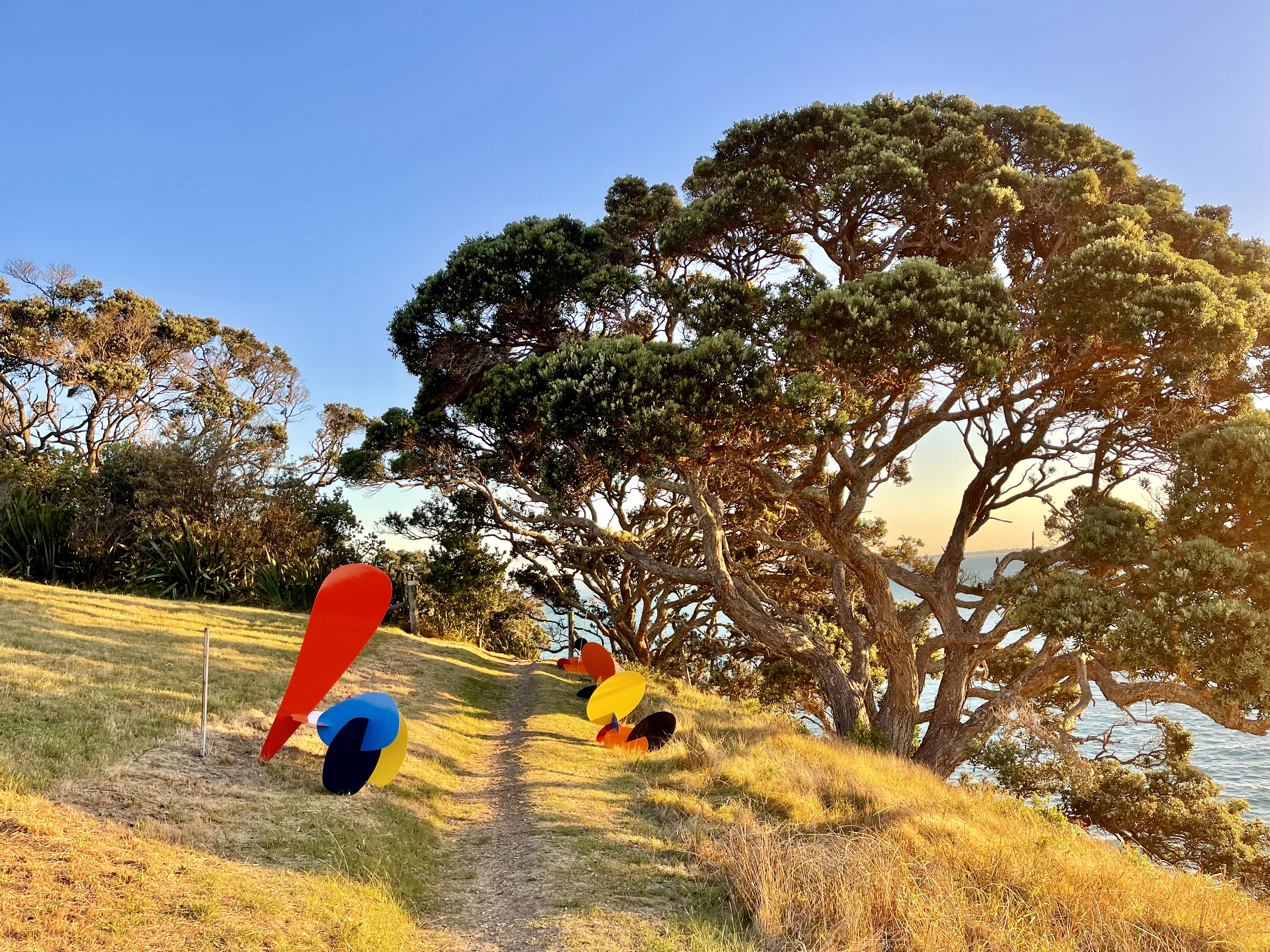
Seung Yul Oh's works Cycloid I, II,III,IV,V, and VI. Sculpture on the Gulf 2024, Waiheke Island.

== Exhibitions ==
=== Solo exhibitions ===
Work	Year	Gallery	Location
Atonal Sonority	2023	NorthArt	Auckland, New Zealand
Guttation	2023	ONE AND J. GALLERY	Seoul, South Korea
Huggong-Monologue	2022	STARKWHITE	Auckland, New Zealand
Touch	2020	ONE AND J. GALLERY	Seoul, South Korea
Vary very	2018	ONE AND J. GALLERY	Seoul, South Korea
Horizontal Loop	2018	STARKWHITE	Auckland, New Zealand
Soom: variation II	2017	Xinchang Culture Centre	Shanghai, China
Slit Scan	2016	Tauranga Art Gallery	Tauranga, New Zealand
HaaPoom	2015	Te Uru Waitakere Contemporary Gallery	Auckland, New Zealand
Left, Right	2015	ONE AND J. GALLERY	Seoul, South Korea
SOOM	2014	Auckland Art Gallery	Auckland, New Zealand
memmem	2014	STARKWHITE	Auckland, New Zealand
MOAMOA, a decade	2014	City Gallery Wellington	Wellington, New Zealand
MOAMOA	2013	Dunedin Public Art Gallery	Dunedin, New Zealand
Huggong	2013	Christchurch Art Gallery	Christchurch, New Zealand
SEESAW	2013	ONE AND J. GALLERY	Seoul, South Korea
Huggong	2012	STARKWHITE	Auckland, New Zealand
Bok	2011	The Physics Room	Christchurch, New Zealand
Solo Group Show	2011	ggooll	Seoul, South Korea
Pokpo	2010	Artspace Aotearoa	Auckland, New Zealand
Bogle Bogle	2010	The Dowse Museum	Wellington, New Zealand
Oddooki	2008	Sculpture Court, Te Papa	Wellington, New Zealand
Daradaradarada	2008	STARKWHITE	Auckland, New Zealand
Ssendong	2007	STARKWHITE	Auckland, New Zealand
Chew Chew Tongue	2006	STARKWHITE	Auckland, New Zealand
All the Way Down Back Inside the Bones of Your Spine	2006	Peter's Garage	Auckland, New Zealand
Sniffing Onioned Armpit	2004	Special Gallery	Auckland, New Zealand
Seung, Deepfried at Peter's Garage	2003	Peter's Garage	Auckland, New Zealand
