= Jenny Cooper (illustrator) =

New Zealand illustrator

Jennifer Cooper (born 11 June 1961) is a New Zealand book illustrator.

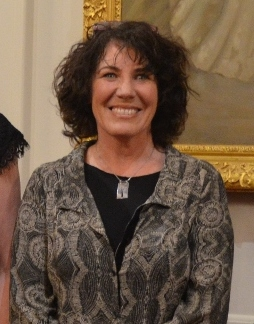
Jenny Cooper

== Biography ==
Cooper was born and grew up in Wellington. She studied graphic design at Christchurch Polytechnic and her first job after graduation was at Canterbury Museum. In 1998 she began working as a freelance illustrator, drawing for junior fiction and educational books.

Cooper spent three years living in Samoa and was a high school teacher there. Her art style ranges from realistic, photograph-based illustrations to cartoons.

== Awards and recognition ==
Year	Award	Publication	Notes
2015	Arts Foundation Mallinson Rendel Illustrators Award		
2015	Storylines Notable Book Award	A Treasury of New Zealand Poems for Children	
2015	New Zealand Book Award for Children and Young Adults – Picture Book Category	Jim's Letters	
2015	Storylines Notable Book Award	Jim's Letters	
2011	Storylines Notable Book Award	Ria the Reckless Wrybill	
2008	Storylines Notable Book Awards	Illustrated Myths and Legends of the Pacific	
2008	Storylines Notable Book Awards	The Mad Tadpole Adventure	
2003	Storylines Notable Book Award	Duck Walk	
2002	Storylines Notable Book Award	The Great Pavlova Cover-up	
2000	Storylines Notable Book Award	The Wooden Fish with Tim Tipene	
1998	New Zealand Post Student Stamp Design		
1988	Telecom New Zealand White Pages Art Award		
