= Leanne Pooley =

New Zealand-Canadian filmmaker

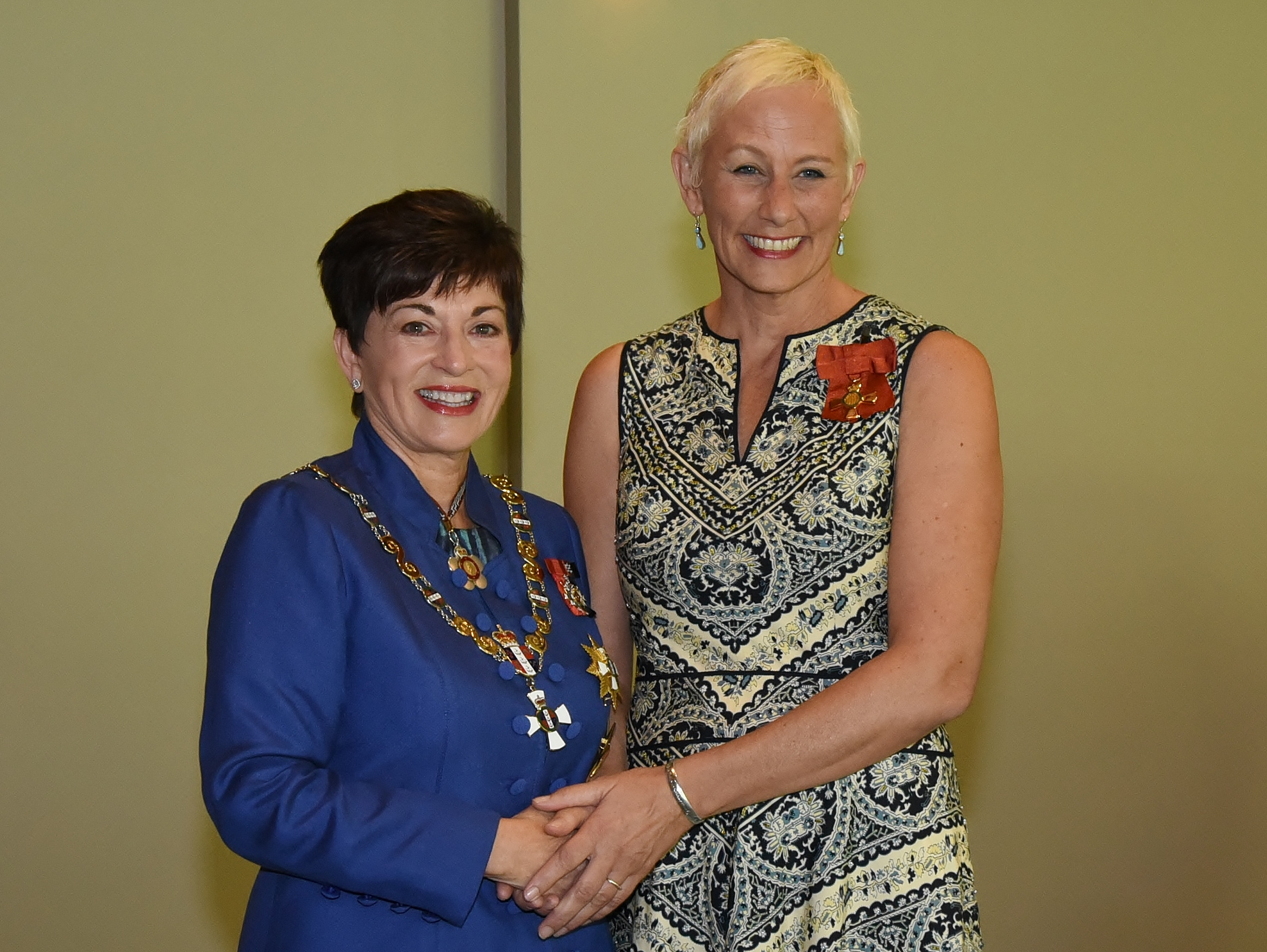
Pooley (right), after her investiture as an Officer of the New Zealand Order of Merit by the governor-general, Dame Patsy Reddy in April 2017

Leanne Pooley ONZM is a Canadian filmmaker based in Auckland, New Zealand. Pooley was born and raised in Winnipeg, Manitoba, Canada, she immigrated to New Zealand in the mid-1980s and began working in the New Zealand television and film industry before moving to England where she worked for many of the world's top broadcasters (BBC, Channel 4, PBS, Discovery etc.). She returned to New Zealand in 1997 and started the production company Spacific Films. Her career spans more than 25 years and she has won numerous international awards (including the People's Choice Award for Documentary at the Toronto International Film Festival in 2009). Leanne Pooley was made a New Zealand Arts Laureate in 2011 and an Officer of the New Zealand Order of Merit in the New Year's Honours List 2017. She is a member of The Academy of Motion Picture Arts and Sciences.

2025 saw the release of her four part TV series, CHOIR GAMES a co-production for SkyNZ & Super Channel Canada. An inspiring programme about the power of music to change lives, the series followed young people to the World Choir Games, the biggest choral competition on earth. In 2022 Pooley produced two documentaries, the feature Film "Dame Valerie Adams: More Than Gold" about five time Olympian Valerie Adams and "Beyond Conversion" for TVNZ about so called 'conversion therapy'. At the same time she produced and directed "Fightback:Joseph Parker" for streaming platform DAZN.

In 2020 Pooley directed two feature documentaries. "We Need To Talk About A.I." for Universal Pictures and GFC films and "The Girl on the Bridge" for Augusto Entertainment and the NZ Film Commission. The former explores the existential risk and exponential benefits of Artificial General Intelligence. The latter follows suicide survivor and activist Jazz Thornton as she confronts teenage suicide head on.

In 2015 Pooley's animated WW1 Feature "25 April" premiered at the Toronto International Film Festival before screening at film festivals around the world. "25 April" was the first New Zealand movie to be in contention for an Academy Award for animation.

In 2013 Leanne directed Beyond the Edge, a 3D feature film about the 1953 Ascent of Everest by Edmund Hillary and Tensing Norgay. The film was a runner-up for the People's Choice Award for Documentary at the Toronto International Film Festival.

In 2009 Pooley made the documentary The Topp Twins: Untouchable Girls, a theatrical feature about the lives of lesbian, singing, twin sister comedy duo, the Topp Twins. The film has won 21 International Awards including at the Toronto International Film Festival, the Melbourne International Film Festival, the Gothenburg International Film Festival, the Seattle Film Festival, New Doc New York, The Nashville Film Festival and the Florida Film Festival among others. It also won Best Feature at the NZ Film & TV Awards, and reached just under $2 million at the New Zealand box office.

Previous documentaries include; Being Billy Apple released in 2007 about the legendary pop turned conceptual artist who used his own identity to explore the concept of artist as art object and whose idea driven works about branding and 'art and life' broke new ground in London and New York; Shackleton's Captain, a documentary about Frank Worsley, captain of Shackleton's Endurance, The Man Who Has Everything for the American Discovery Network, Kiwi Buddha as seen on National Geographic and Haunting Douglas, described by Variety Magazine as an "Expertly crafted video portrait of modern dancer/choreographer Douglas Wright". Haunting Douglas earned Pooley the "Best Director" award at the 2005 New Zealand Screen Awards. Pooley made The Promise about the life of euthanasia advocate, Leslie Martin, winning the "Best Documentary" award at the 2006 New Zealand Screen Awards. Her documentary Try Revolution explores how rugby was used to help end apartheid in South Africa and featured among others Archbishop Desmond Tutu.

Pooley's production company is Spacific Films based in Auckland, New Zealand.

Leanne serves as a judge for The International Academy of Television Arts & Sciences; EMMY Awards. She has taught documentary at various universities and filmschools and is an active member of the New Zealand Director’s Guild and The Academy of Motion Picture Arts and Sciences. Leanne lives in Auckland with her husband and two children.

== Filmography ==
DIRECTOR We Need To talk about AI - GFC - Universal Pictures - 2020 The pros and cons of Artificial General Intelligence.

DIRECTOR: The Girl On The Bridge - Augusto - NZFC - 2020 The story of mental health activist and suicide survivor Jazz Thornton.

DIRECTOR 25 April (2015) - General Film Corporation - NZFC - 2015 An animated feature documentary about the WW1 Gallipoli campaign.

DIRECTOR" "Beyond the Edge" - General Film Corporation - NZFC - 2013 A 3D feature film about the 1953 Ascent of Everest by Edmund Hillary and Tensing Norgay.

PRODUCER: "Finding Mercy" - Spacific Films - 2012 TVNZ/The Knowledge Network - 2012 A heart breaking documentary about two little girls and a friendship that came to represent the lost promise of Zimbabwe.

DIRECTOR: "Shackleton's Captain" - Gebrueder-Beetz/Making Movies - TVNZ/ZDF/ARTE - 2012 A Dramatised documentary about Frank Worsley, Captain of Ernest Shackleton's ill-fated Endurance expedition. Starring Craig Parker.

DIRECTOR: The Topp Twins: Untouchable Girls - Diva Productions - 2009
A documentary film about New Zealand entertainers the Topp Twins which has won over 20 international awards including the "Cadillac People's Choice Award" at the Toronto International Film Festival. It is the most successful documentary ever made in New Zealand.

DIRECTOR/PRODUCER: "Being Billy Apple" - Spacific Films - 2007 Television New Zealand A profile of the artist known as Billy Apple who was at the forefront of both the POP and Conceptual art movements and who alongside the likes of Andy Warhol helped to redefine the meaning of the word artist.

DIRECTOR/PRODUCER: TRY REVOLUTION – Spacific Films - 2006
Television New Zealand / M-Net (South Africa) / SBS (Australia)
How rugby helped to bring down Apartheid in South Africa featuring Archbishop Desmond Tutu.

DIRECTOR/PRODUCER: THE PROMISE – Spacific Films -2005
Television New Zealand / CBC (Canada) / LINK (USA) / TPS (Taiwan)
Feature-length documentary following the incredible journey of Leslie Martin, the euthanasia advocate who was convicted of attempting to murder her mother.
Winner "Best Documentary" and "Best Camera" 2006 NZ Screen Awards.
Winner "Special Mention" Feature Length Documentary DocNZ 2005.
Screened "Input 2006" (Taiwan) selected "Best Of Input" (Brazil).

DIRECTOR/PRODUCER: HAUNTING DOUGLAS – Spacific Films - 2003 Television New Zealand / ABC (Australia) / YLE (Finland) Feature-length documentary about the life and work of Douglas Wright, one of the world’s greatest dancer/choreographers. Screened NZ Film Festival, San Francisco Film Festival (finalist Golden Gate Awards), Sydney Film Festival, Dance on Camera Festival-New York, Reel Dance Festival-Sydney, Vancouver Film Festival, Commonwealth Film Festival – Manchester, Cinedans- Amsterdam, IMZ – Brighton, Golden Prague, Reel Affirmations - Washington, Festival de Cine de Granada. Winner "Best Director" and "Best Editor" 2005 NZ Screen Awards. Winner "Best Documentary" Reel Dance Awards 2004 Sydney

PRODUCER: THE MAN WHO HAS EVERYTHING - NHNZ - 2001 Discovery Health (International) A ground breaking docudrama about men’s health issues.

PRODUCER: KIWI BUDDHA - Spacific Films - 2000 National Geographic (International) / TV3 (New Zealand) / Danish Public Broadcasting / RTÉ (Ireland) / Israel / Korea / France The story of Rinpoche, the Southern Hemisphere’s first Buddhist High Lama

DIRECTOR/PRODUCER: RELATIVE GUILT - Spacific Films - 1999 TV3 (New Zealand) Guilt by association, the family of a murderer. Winner "Best Documentary" 1999 Qantas Media Awards.

DIRECTOR/PRODUCER: EVERYMAN - "PAPABILE" – BBC Manchester - 1997 BBC / (over 50 Territories) A docudrama examining the ancient process of Papal elections.

DIRECTOR: MODERN TIMES-"RELATIVE STRANGERS" – Mosaic Films - 1997 BBC (UK) Exploring the complicated nature of our relationship with in-laws.

DIRECTOR: EYEWITNESS - "Pond & River " - Café Productions –1996 BBC / OPB (PBS America) / (over 80 territories) Part of the Emmy Award-winning series combining history, science, and mythology with nature.

DIRECTOR: EVERYMAN "The Silent Export" - BBC Manchester- 1995 BBC (UK) A docudrama exploring the experiences of Irish Women who travel to England for abortions.

DIRECTOR: BIG SCIENCE (X4) -Wall to Wall Productions – 1994 BBC (UK) A weekly series exploring the moral, ethical and philosophical implications of modern science.

DIRECTOR: DEADLINE (X6) - Real Life Productions – 1994 Channel 4 (UK) A 6-part behind-the-scenes look at the sometimes bizarre world of a regional news channel.

DIRECTOR/PRODUCER: EVERYMAN -"GODS CANDIDATES" – BBC Manchester - 1994 BBC (Worldwide) various territories A documentary about Vatican politics.

DIRECTOR: BRAVE NEW WORLD – Open Media – 1994 Channel 4 (UK) A science film investigating the implications of genetic research on reproductive technology.

DIRECTOR/CAMERA: 40 MINUTES-"WILL THEY RING" - MOSAIC PICTURES – 1993 BBC (Worldwide) various territories A documentary about the problems faced by patients waiting for organ transplants.

DIRECTOR/CAMERA: 40 MINUTES - "A Change of Heart" –Mosaic Pictures - 1993 BBC (Worldwide) various territories A look at the issues surrounding the use of pig’s organs for human transplantation.

DIRECTOR/CAMERA: INSIDE TRACK ON PARENTING - LWT – 1993 ITV (UK) An informative magazine programme about the trials of parenting.

DIRECTOR/CAMERA: FIRST HAND – First Hand Productions - 1990-92 Television New Zealand A series documenting the lives of extraordinary New Zealanders.

== Industry associations ==
- The Academy of Motion Picture Arts and Sciences
- The Screen Director's Guild of New Zealand
- The New Zealand Arts Foundation - Arts Laureate 2011
