= The Topp Twins: Untouchable Girls =

2009 New Zealand documentary film

- Directed by: Leanne Pooley
- Produced by: Arani Cuthbert
- Starring: The Topp Twins
- Cinematography: Leon Narbey; Wayne Vinten
- Edited by: Tim Woodhouse
- Music by: The Topp Twins
- Production company: Diva Productions
- Release date: 2009
- Running time: 84 minutes
- Country: New Zealand
- Language: English

The Topp Twins: Untouchable Girls is a New Zealand documentary film, directed by Leanne Pooley and released in 2009. The film profiles The Topp Twins, a lesbian comedy music duo from New Zealand.

One of the most successful documentary films at the New Zealand box office, the film made over $1 million in its first four weeks of release. To date, it has made almost $2 million in box office sales. The film was produced by Arani Cuthbert. The cinematographer was Leon Narbey.

The film was also screened internationally.

== Awards ==
The film was nominated for three awards at the 2009 Qantas Film and Television Awards, for Best Feature Film – budget under $1 million, Best Original Music in a Feature Film and Best Sound Design in a Feature Film. It won the awards for Best Feature Film and Best Original Music.

At the 2009 Toronto International Film Festival, it won the People's Choice Award for Documentaries.

The film was a nominee for Outstanding Documentary at the 21st GLAAD Media Awards.
