= Russell Kerr (choreographer) =

New Zealand choreographer (1930–2022)

Russell Kerr ONZM QSM
- Kerr photographed for the Auckland Star (1951)
- Born: 10 February 1930; Auckland, New Zealand
- Died: 23 March 2022 (aged 92); Christchurch, New Zealand
- Known for: Choreography
- Spouse: June Greenhalgh (m. 1952; died 2018)
- Children: 2
- Awards: Arts Foundation of New Zealand Icon Award

Russell Ian Kerr ONZM QSM (10 February 1930 – 23 March 2022) was a New Zealand ballet dancer, choreographer, and producer. After spending the 1950s dancing in Europe, he returned to New Zealand where he was instrumental in the development of the New Zealand Ballet Company (now the Royal New Zealand Ballet) and ballet as an art form in New Zealand. He was recognised as one of New Zealand's most significant living artists in 2005 with an Icon Award from the Arts Foundation of New Zealand.

== Biography ==
Kerr was born on 10 February 1930 in Auckland. He attended Ellerslie Primary School and Otahuhu College. As a boy he suffered from muscular rheumatism and received medical advice that taking up dancing would help. He began his career as a ballet student of Kathleen Whitford. In 1950, he received a government bursary for travel to Europe. He spent the 1950s dancing with well-known dance companies such as the José Greco Spanish Company, Sadlers Wells Ballet (now the Royal Ballet), Ballet Rambert and the London Festival Ballet (with whom he toured as a soloist and principal dancer in Europe, Canada, Israel and the USA). He recalled in later life having to demand that Greco pay him for the Spanish dancing season. In 1953, he married June Greenhalgh, a young English dancer. They had two children together.

Kerr and his wife returned to New Zealand in the late 1950s, and he became director of the Nettleton-Edwards-Kerr School, along with working for the Auckland Ballet Theatre. Together with Poul Gnatt he invited other New Zealanders who were performing overseas to return to the country and form a company, the United Ballet. In 1959 he and Gnatt choreographed and produced the show Prismatic Variations. In 1962 he was appointed the artistic director of the New Zealand Ballet Company, and in 1969 he became director of the New Zealand Dance Centre in Grafton, Auckland. Kerr supported Limbs Dance Company as they were starting out by offering studio space at the New Zealand Dance Centre and "choreographic support". During this time he was part of an Artistic Directorate which created the New Zealand School of Dance (formally the National School of Ballet), along with Rowena Jackson, Philip Chatfield, Sara Neil and Poul Gnatt. The school opened in 1967, and Kerr was its director from September 1967 to 1968.

From 1978 to 1990 he led the Southern Ballet Theatre in Christchurch. Since leaving his post as artistic director of the New Zealand Ballet Company he continued to be associated with and to choreograph and stage productions for the company until late in life. Other positions he held included vice-patron of the Auckland Dance Company, patron of the International Ballet Academy and trustee of the Christchurch Dance Education Bursary Trust. Raoul Neave, chairman of the latter, said of Kerr in 1999: "I think he's one of those people who just contribute an enormous amount, not only with what he's achieved personally, but the work he's done with young dancers, choreography, and directing throughout the country. In Britain he would have been knighted by now."

His notable productions include Petrouchka (in 1964, 1967, 1993 and 1997), Peter Pan (first performed in 1999), Swan Lake (performed first in the 1960s and revised in the 1990s), The Nutcracker on numerous occasions, and Hans Christian Andersen (2005). The latter was a new full-length ballet based on the life of Hans Christian Andersen, with music by Richard Strauss and Dmitry Kabalevsky. Reviewer Christopher Moore for The Press called Kerr a "choreographic magician": "Coinciding with the 200th anniversary of Hans Christian Andersen's birth, Kerr has choreographed a ballet that strips away the mask of legend". He explored a "more contemporary approach to ballet" with a commission for Limbs Dance Company in 1983.

Kerr died in Christchurch on 23 March 2022 at the age of 92.

== Awards and honours ==
Kerr received a QEII Arts Council Fellowship in 1977. He received the Queen's Service Medal for community service in the 1986 Queen's Birthday Honours. In the 2000 Queen's Birthday Honours, he was appointed an Officer of the New Zealand Order of Merit, for services to ballet and dance. In 2005 he received an Icon Award from the Arts Foundation of New Zealand, an award bestowed on twenty of New Zealand’s most significant living artists for extraordinary lifetime achievement. In 2018, the annual Russell Kerr Lecture in Ballet & Related Arts was named for him.
