= Turid Revfeim =

New Zealand dancer, educator and author

Turid Revfeim (born 1961) is a New Zealand ballet dancer, choreographer, artistic director and ballet tutor. She danced with the Royal New Zealand Ballet and was a soloist at the Theater de Stadt Koblenz for four years. After retirement as a dancer, Revfeim has been Ballet Mistress at the RNZB, a teacher at the New Zealand School of Dance, and has written a history of the school. She founded a company, BalletCollective Aotearoa, in 2020.

== Early life and education ==
Revfeim was born in Auckland. Revfeim is a graduate of the New Zealand School of Dance, having begun her studies there in 1979. She has a Bachelor of Arts in Dance.

== Work ==
Revfeim joined the Royal New Zealand Ballet (RNZB) in 1980, dancing Giselle and The Nutcracker. Revfeim was a soloist at the Theater de Stadt Koblenz in Germany for four years.

Revfeim retired from dancing in 1999 to become the artistic co-ordinator and then for eleven years was Ballet Mistress of RNZB. Revfeim tutors at the New Zealand School of Dance, and wrote a history of the school to celebrate its 50th anniversary in 2017. She appeared at the Auckland Writers Festival in 2018 to talk about her book.

In 2020, she founded dance company BalletCollective Aotearoa. She is artistic director and producer of the company. The company premiered with Subtle Dances at the Bruce Mason Theatre in Takapuna, Auckland in April 2021, as part of the Auckland Arts Festival. Subtle Dances was choreographed by three New Zealand choreographers, Cameron McMillan, Loughlan Prior and Sarah Knox. Also in 2020, Revfeim was an associate of the Dance Needs Attention initiative, a series of education courses based in Wellington, which aimed to encourage dance studies. In 2024, Revfeim restaged Swan Lake for the RNZB.

== Bibliography ==
- Revfeim, Turid; A'Court, Stephen (2017). New Zealand School of Dance: 50 years, 1967–2017. New Zealand School of Dance. p. 128. ISBN 978-0-473-38357-2. Wikidata Q108146998.
