= Waimea College =

Secondary school in New Zealand

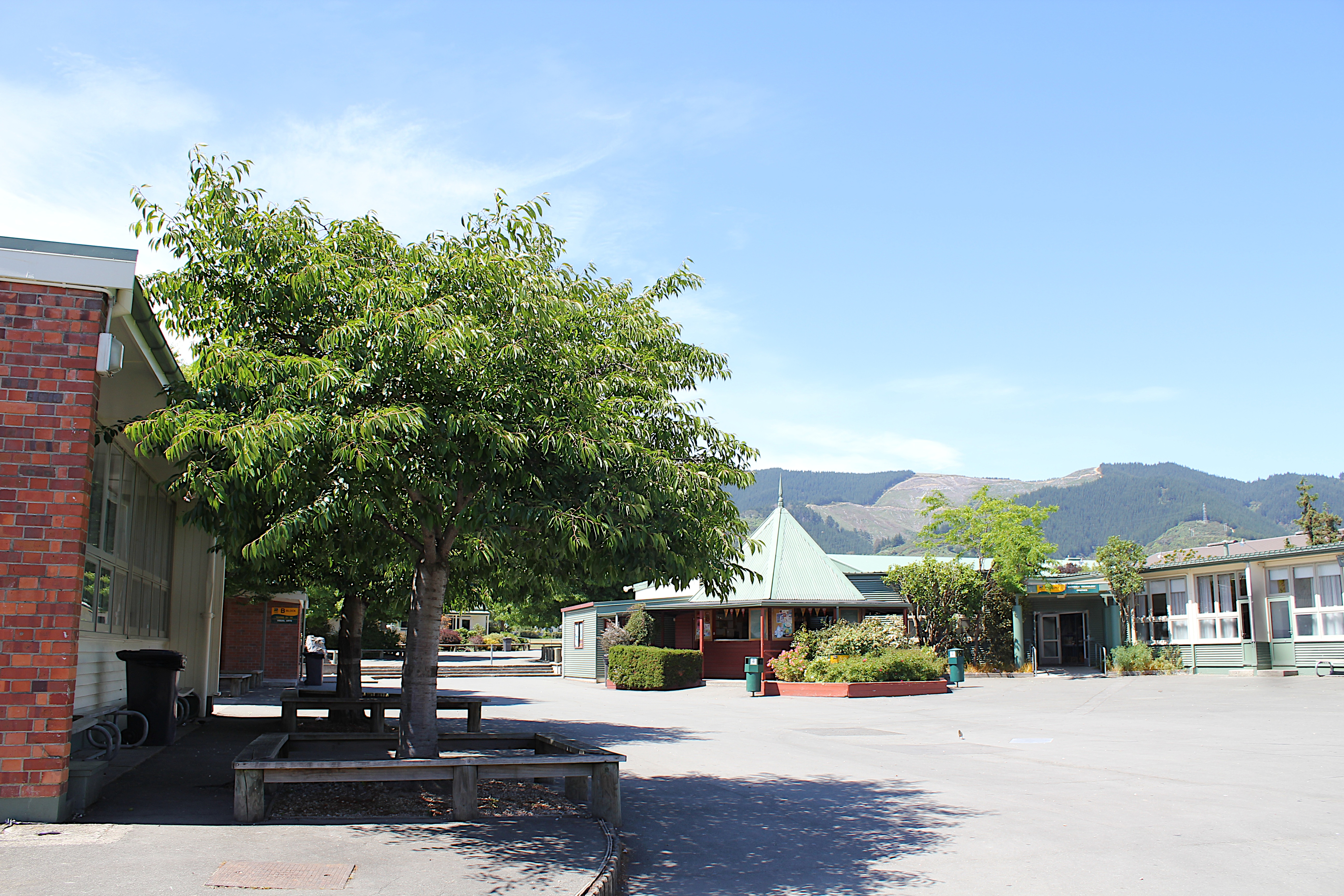

Location
- 60 Salisbury Road; Richmond, 7020; New Zealand; 41°20′18″S 173°11′48″E

Information
- Type: State co-educational secondary, years 9–13
- Motto: Latin: Semper contendite (Always strive)
- Established: 1957; 69 years ago
- Ministry of Education Institution no.: 296
- Principal: Fraser Hill
- Enrolment: 1,526 (July 2026)
- Socio-economic decile: 8
- Website: www.waimea.school.nz

Waimea College is a co-educational secondary school in Richmond, Tasman District, New Zealand. Opened in 1957, the college has over 1500 students, and is the largest school in the top of the South Island.

== History ==
Waimea College was established in 1957.

== Enrolment ==
As of July 2026, Waimea College has a roll of 1,526 students, of which 173 (11.3%) identify as Māori.

As of 2026, the school has an Equity Index of 447, placing it amongst schools whose students have below average socioeconomic barriers to achievement (roughly equivalent to decile 7 under the former socio-economic decile system).

== House system ==
Waimea College has a house system, with six houses named after six famous New Zealanders:

- Cooper (red), named after Whina Cooper
- Hillary (yellow), named after Edmund Hillary
- Rutherford (green), named after Ernest Rutherford
- Sheppard (blue), named after Kate Sheppard
- Ngata (purple), named after Apirana Ngata
- Carrington (orange), named after Lisa Carrington

Students participate in various inter-house competitions throughout the year. At the end of each academic year, the house with the highest points total across all the events is awarded the House Shield.

== Notable staff ==
- Harold Nelson, athlete

== Notable alumni ==
- George Bennett – cyclist
- Paul Beresford – British politician
- Mike Coman – rugby union player
- Craig De Goldi – rugby union player
- Caleb Delany – rugby union player
- Rod Dixon – athlete
- Mark Douglas – cricketer
- Roger Kerr – businessman
- Annette King – politician
- Suzie Moncrieff – founder of the World of Wearable Art show
- Sharon O'Neill – singer–songwriter
- Anita Punt – field hockey player
- Jason Richards – motor-racing driver
- Kelsey Smith – field hockey player
- Rachel Sutherland – field hockey player
- David Teece – economist and entrepreneur
- Ken Wadsworth – cricketer
