= Solitaire (ballet) =

1956 ballet by Kenneth MacMillan

Solitaire is a one-act ballet created by Kenneth MacMillan in 1956 for the Sadler's Wells Theatre Ballet (later the Royal Ballet), London. The music is by Malcolm Arnold: his two sets of English Dances, with two new dances specially composed by Arnold, a sarabande and a polka. The polka was created for New Zealand dancer Sara Neil.

The first performance was at Sadler's Wells Theatre, London on 7 June 1956. The principal character, called The Girl, was danced by Margaret Hill.

== Original cast ==
- Margaret Hill, The Girl
- Sara Neil
- Donald Britton
- Michael Boulton
- Donald MacLeary
