= Sara Neil =

Sara Neil may refer to:

- Sara Neil (cyclist)
- Sara Neil (dancer)
