= Peter McKenzie (actor) =

New Zealand actor

- McKenzie as Elendil in The Lord of the Rings: The Fellowship of the Ring (2001)
- Born: Peter Leo McKenzie; Wellington, New Zealand
- Died: September 9, 2023 (aged 80); Wellington, New Zealand
- Occupation: Actor
- Years active: 1996–2005
- Spouse: Deirdre Tarrant (m. 1971)
- Children: Bret McKenzie

Peter Leo McKenzie (d. 2023) was a New Zealand actor. He spent his early days in Whanganui and received his secondary education at St Augustine's College. He is best known for his portrayal as Elendil in Peter Jackson's The Lord of the Rings: The Fellowship of the Ring. He also appeared in Jackson's King Kong.

His wife, Deirdre Tarrant, was a choreographer who founded Footnote Dance. Their son, Bret, was a member of the comedy duo Flight of the Conchords, and also appears as an unnamed Elf (popularly known as Figwit) in The Fellowship of the Ring, and The Return of the King.

He was also an owner and trainer of racehorses, including Sculptor who won the 2007 Saab Quality at Flemington and qualified to run in the 2007 Melbourne Cup.

== Filmography ==
=== Films ===
Year	Title	Role	Notes
1982	The Last Horror Film	N/A	Special effects crew
2001	The Lord of the Rings: The Fellowship of the Ring	Elendil	
2002	In My Opinion		TV movie
2005	King Kong	Venture crewmember #22	
2009	It's Complicated	Dr. Allen	

=== Television ===
Year	Title	Role	Notes
1996	Crossroads Café	Restaurant critic	1 episode
1998	The Legend of William Tell	Warrior captain	10 episodes
2000	Dark Knight	Edwin of Stringburn	1 episode
