= Loughlan Prior =

New Zealand dancer and choreographer

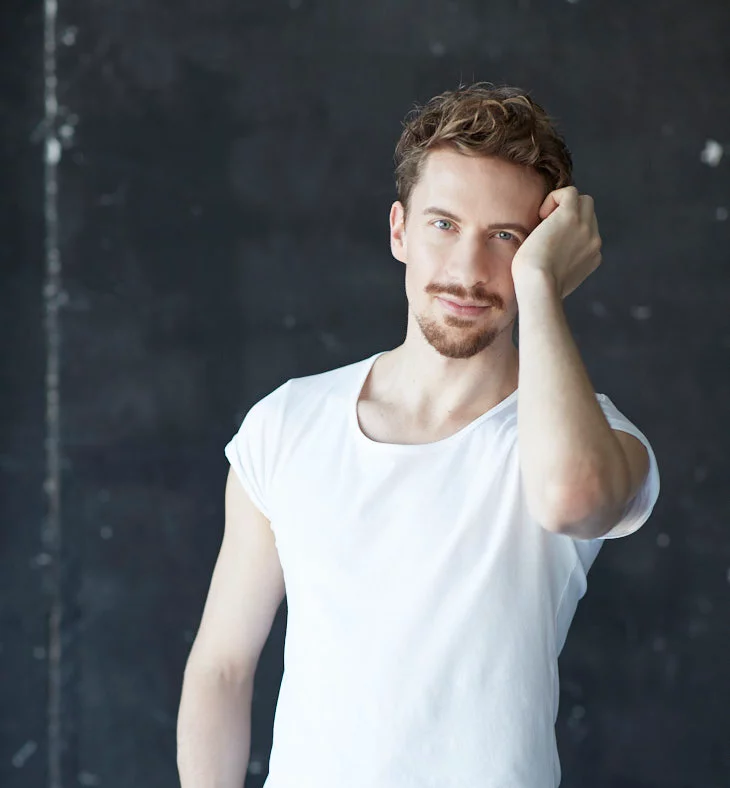
Prior in 2019

Loughlan Prior is a dancer and choreographer. He creates theatre, film and multimedia projects, and has had his work presented in New Zealand, Australia, Canada, Denmark, Hong Kong, Germany and the United States.

He was appointed choreographer in residence at the Royal New Zealand Ballet in 2018.

== Biography ==
Prior was born in Australia. He started ballet when he was five, and continued through high school going to the Victorian College of the Arts in Melbourne. Moving to New Zealand after that, he attended the New Zealand School of Dance in Wellington and graduated in 2009, when he joined the Royal New Zealand Ballet.

Prior developed his choreographic practice while he was dancing at the Royal New Zealand Ballet, retiring from his dance role in 2019.

In 2014, Prior became the creative director of Prior Visual, a project-based film collective, and in 2020 started a company Lo | Co Arts, with composer Claire Cowan.

== Credits ==
As choreographer

- 2016 – Curious Alchemy, Assemblée Internationale, Canada
- 2019 – The Appearance of Colour, Queensland Ballet
- 2019 – Hansel and Gretel, Royal New Zealand Ballet
- 2021 – Transfigured Night, Chamber Music New Zealand (featuring music by Schoenberg, New Zealand composer Tabea Squire and Dvorak)
- 2021 – Subtle Dances, BalletCollective Aotearoa, Dunedin Festival of the Arts
- 2021 – Ultra Violet, Royal New Zealand Ballet, Festival of Colour Festival, Wānaka
- 2021 – The Firebird, Royal New Zealand Ballet. Costume and set design: Tracy Grant Lord; lighting design: Jon Buswell; animation/visuals: POW Studios; title role, soloist Ana Gallardo Lobaina.
- 2021 – Timeweaver, New Zealand School of Dance Graduation

== Awards ==
- 2015 – Harry Haythorne Award (Ballet Foundation of New Zealand)
- 2016 – Tup Lang Choreographic Award (Creative New Zealand)
