= Deirdre Tarrant =

New Zealand dancer, dance teacher and choreographer

Deirdre Tarrant CNZM
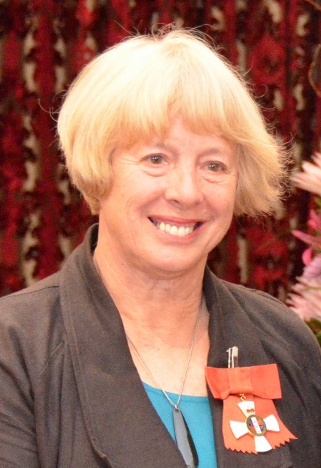
- Tarrant in 2013
- Born: Deirdre Elizabeth Anne Tarrant; 1946 (age 79–80)
- Occupations: Choreographer, contemporary dance teacher
- Spouse: Peter McKenzie (m. 1971; died 2023)
- Children: Bret McKenzie

Deirdre Elizabeth Anne Tarrant CNZM (born 1946) is a New Zealand dancer, dance teacher and choreographer. She was the founding director of Footnote Dance and is principal of the Tarrant Dance Studios.

Tarrant was born in 1946, the daughter of Alfred Edward Tarrant, a Wellington manufacturer. She danced with the New Zealand Ballet Company while studying for a Bachelor of Arts degree at Victoria University of Wellington in 1967.

Tarrant founded Footnote Dance in 1985. She led that company until 2012, when she handed over to Malia Johnston. She has been a vocational examiner for the Royal Academy of Dance. She is principal of the Tarrant Dance Studios.

== Awards and honours ==
Tarrant was made a Member of the New Zealand Order of Merit in the 2000 New Year Honours for "services to dance and the community". She was promoted to Companion in the 2013 Queen's Birthday Honours for "services to contemporary dance".

In 2006 she was one of the first distinguished alumni to be appointed by the Victoria University of Wellington.

== Personal ==
Tarrant married actor Peter Leo McKenzie in 1971. Their son Bret McKenzie is a comedian, actor, musician and producer, best known as one of musical comedy duo, Flight of the Conchords.
