= New Zealand School of Dance =

Ballet and contemporary dance school

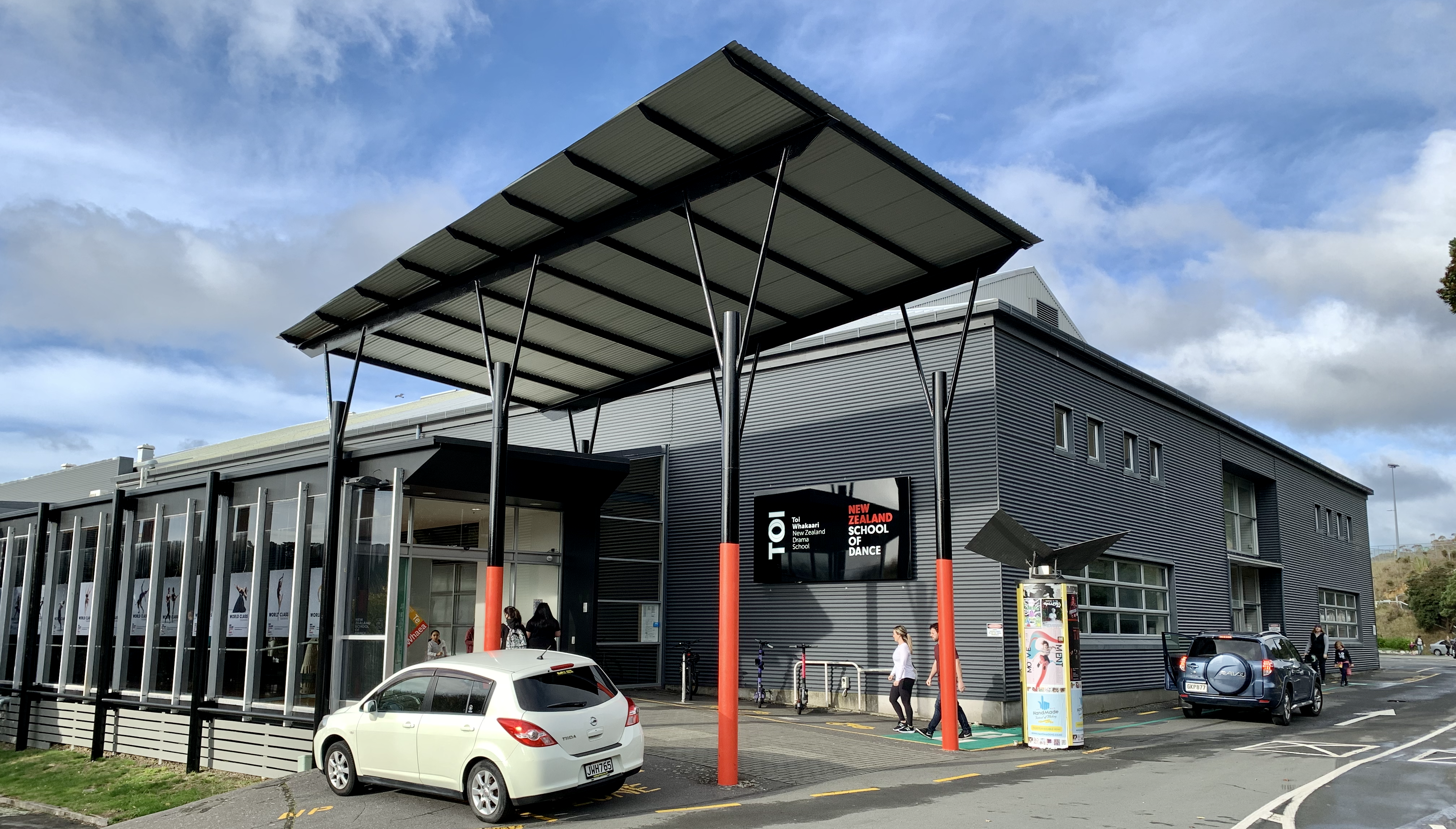
Te Whaea home of the New Zealand School of Dance

The New Zealand School of Dance was established in 1967 and is a tertiary educational institute in New Zealand that teaches contemporary dance and ballet. It started as the National School of Ballet, and after contemporary dance was added in 1982 the name was changed to the New Zealand School of Dance.

== About ==
The school has two qualifications, a two year diploma or a three year diploma with a classical or contemporary dance stream, and prepares students for careers as professional dancers. The New Zealand School of Dance is housed in Te Whaea: The National Centre for Dance and Drama in Wellington, New Zealand.

== History ==
The director of the school when it was first set up was Sarah Neil with nine full-time and four part-time students in 1967. The school was funded by the Queen Elizabeth II Arts Council and formed in with the New Zealand Ballet Trust Board. For the first 15 years it was called the National School of Ballet. Other directors include Russell Kerr (1967 - 1968), Dorothy Daniels (1969 - 1971), Philip Chatfield (1972 - 1975), and Rowena Jackson (1975 - 1978). The current director is Garry Trinder appointed in 1998 and his first role was to oversee the move into the current premises at Te Whaea.

== Graduates ==
Graduates of the school have been in the following companies:

Akram Khan Company, Atamira Dance Company, The Australian Ballet, Australian Dance Theatre, Ballet Arizona, Black Grace, Co:3 Australia, Dancenorth, English National Ballet, Footnote Dance, Hofesh Shechter II, Houston Ballet, Java Dance Company, Kibbutz Contemporary Dance Company, Leipzig Ballet, The National Ballet of Canada, New Zealand Dance Company, Queensland Ballet, Rambert, Royal New Zealand Ballet, The Sarasota Ballet, Singapore Ballet, Studio Wayne McGregor, Sydney Dance Company, Thüringer Staatsballett, The Washington Ballet, West Australian Ballet.

In the contemporary dance area notable graduates include Raewyn Hill who is active in Australia as a choreographer and artistic director, and Lisa Densem who lives and works in Berlin as a choreographer. In New Zealand are Shona McCullagh who set up the New Zealand Dance Company and went on to be the artistic director of the Auckland Festival, Taiaroa Royal and Taane Mete who formed Okareka Dance Company and Ross McCormack whose company is called Muscle Mouth. Daniel Belton is the artistic director of Good Company Arts.

Graduate Katherine Skelton (née Grange) is a soloist with the Royal New Zealand Ballet in 2021 and Paul Mathews is a principal. He has been with the company since 2006. Graduate Tirion Law was promoted to principal of The National Ballet of Canada in 2024.
