= June Kerr =

New Zealand ballet dancer

- Born: June Greenhalgh; 12 June 1932; Southend-on-Sea, Essex, England
- Died: 29 October 2018 (aged 86); Christchurch, New Zealand
- Spouse: Russell Kerr (m. 1956)

June Kerr (née Greenhalgh; 12 June 1932 – 29 October 2018) was an English-born New Zealand ballet dancer who danced for 11 years with the Royal New Zealand Ballet.

== Biography ==
Kerr was born in Southend-on-Sea, Essex, England, the youngest of three children. She was one of the founding members of the London-based company, Festival Ballet, which later became the English National Ballet. On 8 December 1956, she married New Zealand ballet dancer Russell Kerr. The following year the couple moved to New Zealand, settling in Auckland where June Kerr danced with the Royal New Zealand Ballet in 1959 and 1960. In 1962 Kerr and her husband moved to Wellington as Kerr's husband was appointed director of the company.

In the 1970s Kerr and her husband moved to Christchurch and established the Southern Ballet Theatre.

Kerr died in Christchurch on 29 October 2018.
