= Tracy Grant Lord =

New Zealand stage designer of theatre, opera and ballet

- Citizenship: New Zealand
- Occupations: Scenographer, costume designer

Tracy Grant Lord is a leading New Zealand scenographer and costume designer of ballet, theatre and opera. She has worked with numerous Australasian performance companies including the Royal New Zealand Ballet, New Zealand Opera, Australian Ballet, Opera Australia, Queensland Ballet as well as the Auckland, Sydney, Melbourne and Queensland Theatre Companies.

== Career ==
Grant Lord graduated with a degree in Spatial Design from Auckland University of Technology in 1996. She was 23 when she designed her first opera.

In 2011 she was nominated for Best Costume Design for the 11th Helpmann Awards and in 2012 she was nominated again in the same category at the 12th awards ceremony.

In 2014 Grant Lord created the costumes for the Singapore Dance Theatre production of Sleeping Beauty. She has designed several productions for the Royal New Zealand Ballet (RNZB) including their 50th Anniversary production of Romeo and Juliet (2003), The production contrasted set pieces reminiscent of Verona with costumes that carried a modernist feel. It toured throughout New Zealand, with performances at the St James Theatre, Wellington (Wellington), Municipal Theatre (Napier), Aotea Centre (Auckland), Founders Theatre (Hamilton), Regent on Broadway (Palmerston North), Regent Theatre (Dunedin) and the Theatre Royal (Christchurch), where it opened the Christchurch Arts Festival. The RNZB production of Romeo and Shortly toured to the United Kingdom and received a nomination for Best New Dance Production at the Laurence Olivier Awards.

Other productions for RNZB include Ihi FrENZy (2001), The Wedding (2006), a love story written by Witi Ihimaera with choreography by Mark Baldwin and music by Gareth Farr, Cinderella (2007) and The Firebird (2020), with choreography by Loughlan Prior.

Among Grant Lord's opera designs was the 2015 production of Lucia di Lammermoor, directed by Raymond Hawthorne and produced by Auckland Chamber Orchestra and Auckland Opera Studio. Critic William Dart wrote:

Working with designer Tracy Grant Lord, Hawthorne's 18th century Scotland was grim and foreboding under the lights of Jennifer Lal. An effectively austere set was built around various cross motifs; costumes were rigorously dark-toned, apart from a white wedding dress for Lucia and a brilliant red gown for her final swansong. (William Dart 2014)

Other collaborations with the late director Raymond Hawthorne included set and costumes for the musical Guys and Dolls for Auckland Theatre Company in 2015, with lighting by Andrew Potvin. She has also collaborated regularly with lighting designer Kendall Smith and choreographer Liam Scarlett to create works such as A Midsummer Night’s Dream and Dangerous Liaisons for Queensland Ballet.

In 2023 Grant Lord designed costumes for New Zealand Opera’s productions of Unruly Tourist, composed by Luke Di Somma with a libretto by Livi Reihana and Amanda Kennedy, as well as Cosi Fan Tutte, the latter having almost 100 costumes. Grant Lord tailored a custom-made ensemble for the New Zealand Symphony Orchestra's conductor Gemma New. It was designed to allow New plenty of freedom of movement while conducting.

== Awards ==
- 1997 – (finalist) Best Craft in Short Film Drama’ - New Zealand Film and Television Awards
- 1999 – UNESCO Prize for Emerging Artists - Prague Quadrennial
- 1999 – Best Production Design - St Kilda Film Festival (for short film Possum)
- 2003 – Jury Award - Prague Quadrennial
- 2011 – Helpmann Award Nomination for In the Next Room - Sydney Theatre Company
- 2012 – Helpmann Award Nomination for The Importance of Being Earnest - Melbourne Theatre Company
