= Lisa Densem =

Choreographer from New Zealand

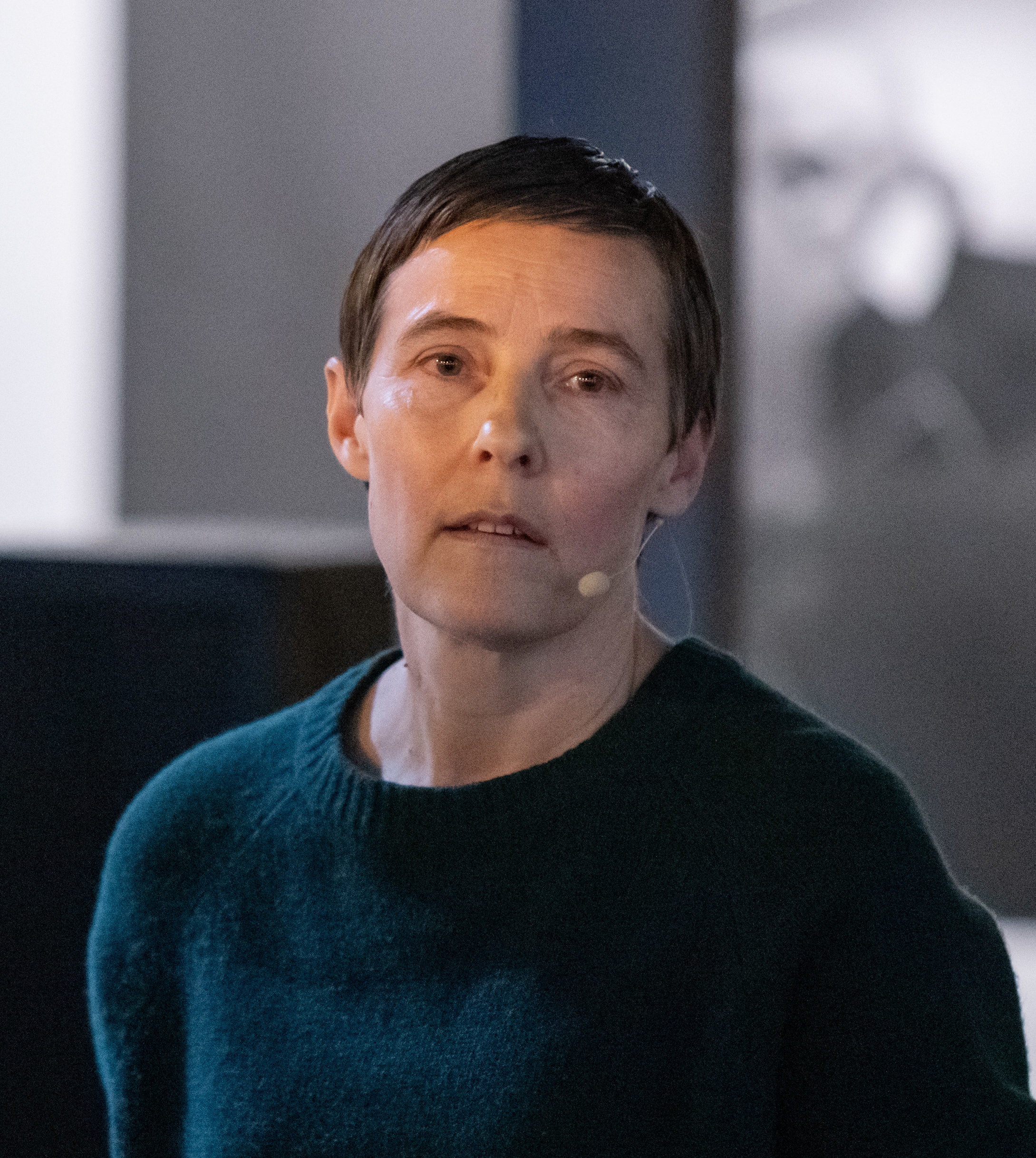
- Densem at Re:publica Portland 2019
- Occupations: Choreographer; Dancer

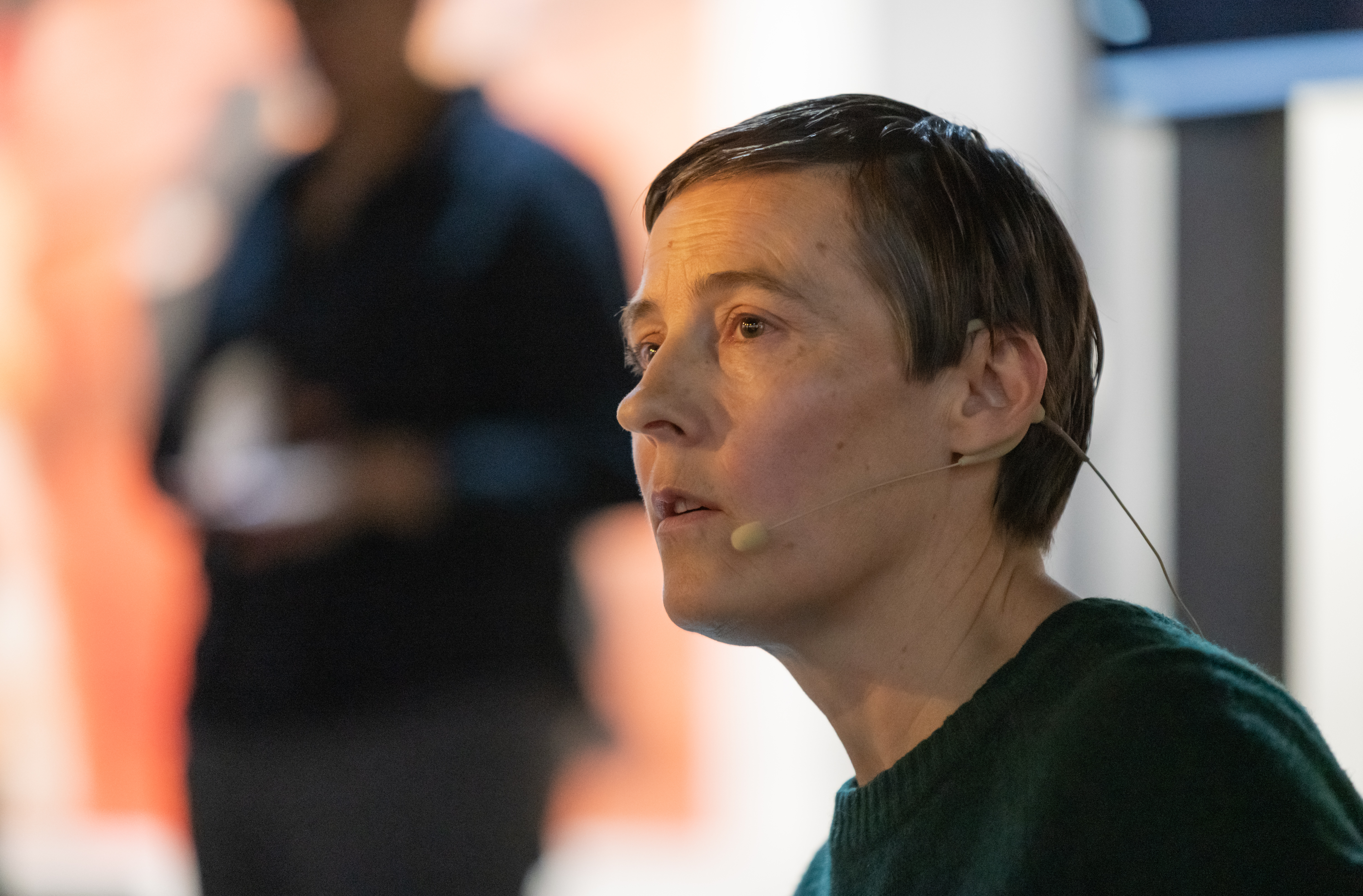
Lisa Densem in 2019

Lisa Densem (born 1965) is a New Zealand choreographer.

== Biography ==
Densem grew up in Christchurch, New Zealand. Her father, John Densem, was a composer and musician. She trained at New Zealand School of Dance in 1985 and 1986. In 1998 she received a Creative New Zealand scholarship to study in New York and in 1999 she moved to Berlin, Germany, to work with the German dance company Sasha Waltz & Guests run by Sasha Waltz. She remained with the company until 2004, when she became a freelance performer and choreographer.

In 2013 Densem returned to New Zealand to create a new dance work for Footnote Dance; she also created No Such Place for Footnote in 2005.

Densem collaborated in 2021 with Miriam Jakob and Jana Unmüßig who are on scholarship with Berlin Artistic Research on the performance Meandering nearby Breathing.

== Filmography ==
Year	Title	Role	Notes
1994	Forever	Dancer	
1999	Losing Sleep	Choreographer and dancer	
2010	American Night	Choreographer	
2011	Broke But Sexy	Herself	
2012	Virtuosi	Herself	
