= English Dances (Arnold) =

Compositions by Malcolm Arnold

Lyrita recording of Malcolm Arnold's Orchestral Dances

English Dances, Op. 27 and 33, are two sets of light music pieces, composed for orchestra by Malcolm Arnold in 1950 and 1951. Each set consists of four dances inspired by, although not based upon, country folk tunes and dances. Each movement is denoted by the tempo marking, as the individual movements are untitled.

== Background ==
Bernard de Nevers, the head of the composer's then publisher Alfred Lengnick & Co. asked Arnold to write a suite of dances akin to Antonín Dvořák's Slavonic Dances. This resulted in the first set. The set was premiered on 14 April 1951 by the London Philharmonic Orchestra conducted by Sir Adrian Boult.

After the success of the first set, de Nevers asked for a second set, which the composer completed the following year. The second set was premiered on 5 August 1952 at the Royal Albert Hall with the BBC Symphony Orchestra under Sir Malcolm Sargent.

The first movement of the second set, Allegro non troppo, was used from 1969 to 2008 as the theme music for the long-running UK television programme What the Papers Say, and was used again for the revived version of the programme on BBC Radio Four.

Shades and passages of the third movement of the first set, Mesto, are recognisable in the main title of Maurice Jarre's Oscar-winning music for David Lean's 1965 film Doctor Zhivago. The two pieces are of similar length.

== Movements ==
English Dances, Set I, Op. 27

1. Andantino
2. Vivace
3. Mesto
4. Allegro risoluto

English Dances, Set II, Op. 33

1. Allegro non troppo
2. Con brio
3. Grazioso
4. Giubiloso – Lento e maestoso

== Instrumentation ==
The instrumentation for set 1 is piccolo, 2 flutes, 2 oboes, 2 clarinets, 2 bassoons, 4 horns, 3 trumpets, 3 trombones, tuba, timpani, percussion (glockenspiel, tubular bells, tam tam, side drum, bass drum, cymbals, wood block), harp and strings.

The instrumentation for set 2 is piccolo, 2 flutes, 2 oboes, 2 clarinets, 2 bassoons, 4 horns, 3 trumpets, 3 trombones, tuba, timpani, percussion (glockenspiel, side drum, bass drum, cymbals, tam tam, tambourine, tubular bells) celeste, harp and strings.

== Solitaire ==
In 1956 Kenneth MacMillan created the one-act ballet Solitaire based on the two sets of English Dances. MacMillan created two new pieces for the ballet, the "Sarabande and Polka". It was first performed at Sadler's Wells London on 7 June 1956.

=== Ballet sequencing ===
1. Set II, No. 3
2. Set I, No. 1
3. Set I, No. 2
4. Set I, No. 3
5. Set I, No. 4
6. Sarabande
7. Polka
8. Set II, No. 2
9. Set II, No. 1
10. Set II, No. 4
11. Set II, No. 3 (reprise)

== Arrangements ==
- 1958 for piano duet by Franz Reizenstein
- 1965 for Wind band by Maurice Johnstone
- 1984 for Brass band by Ray Farr

== Selected commercial recordings ==
- 1954 Adrian Boult and the London Philharmonic Orchestra latest CD release on Decca 468 803-2 (The first recording)
- 1979 Malcolm Arnold and the London Philharmonic Orchestra on Lyrita LP and CD: SRCD.201 ()) (recorded by the composer)
- 1996 Andrew Penny conducting the Queensland Symphony Orchestra on Naxos Records 8.553526 (Sir Malcolm Arnold: Dances)

== See also ==
- Baroque dance
- English Country Dance
- Morris dance
- Scottish Dances

== Sources ==
- Burton-Page, Piers. 2001. "Arnold, Sir Malcolm (Henry)". The New Grove Dictionary of Music and Musicians, second edition, edited by Stanley Sadie and John Tyrrell. London: Macmillan Publishers.
