= Philip Chatfield =

Artistic director of the Royal New Zealand Ballet

- Born: 2 December 1927
- Died: 25 July 2021 (aged 93)
- Occupations: Ballet dancer, artistic director
- Employer(s): Royal Ballet, Royal New Zealand Ballet
- Known for: Ballet
- Spouse: Rowena Jackson

Philip Chatfield (2 December 1927 – 25 July 2021) was a British born ballet dancer, choreographer and artistic director. He danced for the Royal Ballet and was artistic director of the Royal New Zealand Ballet.

== Early life ==
Chatfield was born in 1927 near Southampton, England, starting ballet at the age of six. He took up a scholarship to the Sadler's Wells Ballet School at the age of 11.

== Career ==
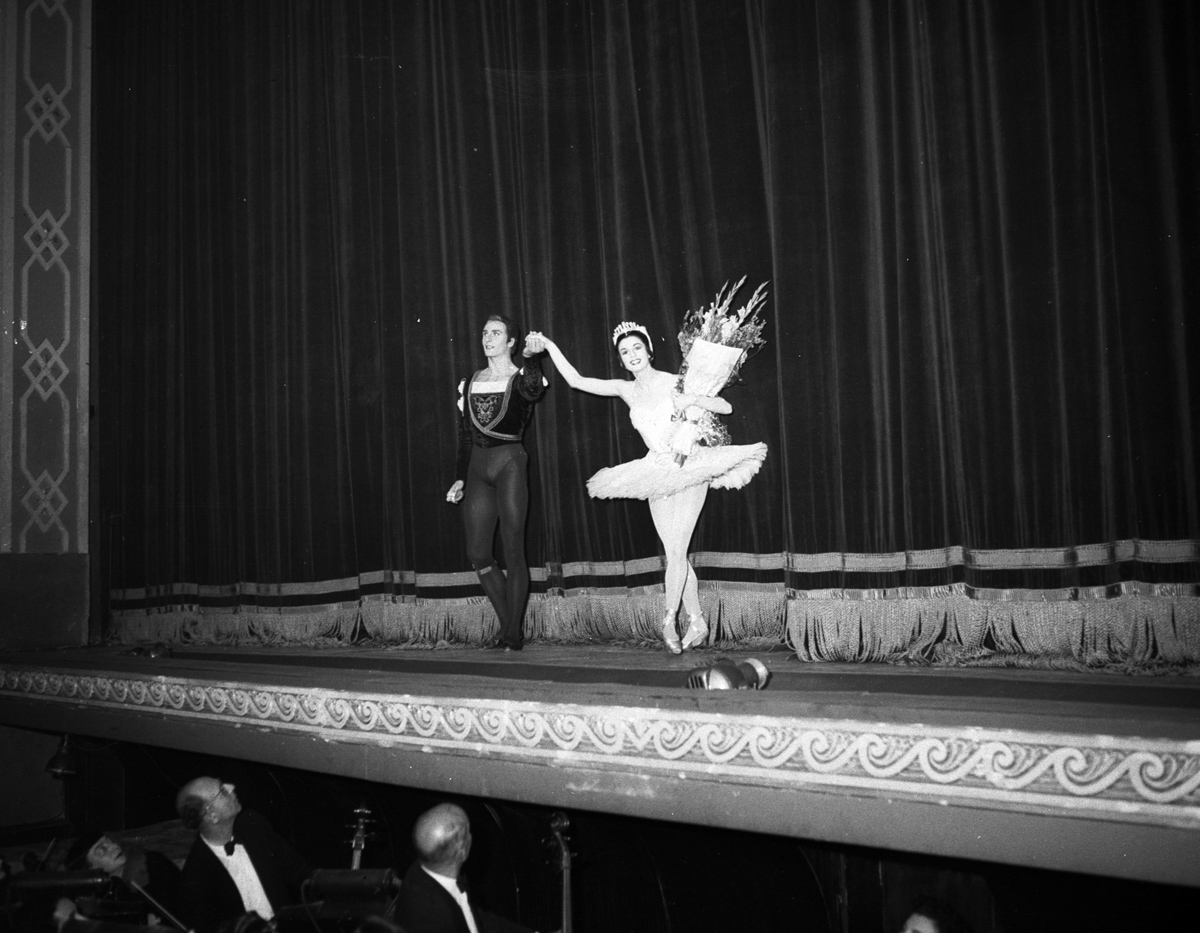
Philip Chatfield and Rowena Jackson on stage in Sydney, 1958

Chatfield became a full-time member at Sadler's Wells (later the Royal Ballet) at the age of 15 in 1943. He became a principal dancer in 1955. He performed leading and solo roles.

In 1958–1959 Chatfield toured in Europe, America, New Zealand and Australia with his ballet dancer wife, New Zealander Rowena Jackson. In 1959 Chatfield and Jackson retired from performing and left London to settle in New Zealand. That year, with other dancers such as Russell Kerr and Poul Gnatt, they formed the United Ballet Company which toured New Zealand. In the mid–1970s Chatfield became director of the National School of Ballet, with Jackson as associate director. From 1975–1978 Chatfield was artistic director of the Royal New Zealand Ballet. In 1993 Chatfield and Jackson moved to live near family in Brisbane.

== Personal life ==
Chatfield married Rowena Jackson in 1958. They had one son and one daughter.

He died in Brisbane on 25 July 2021.
