= What the Papers Say =

British television and radio series (since 1956)

- Voices of: Peter Wheeler; Barrie Hesketh; Bill Croasdale; Don Murray Henderson; Ray Moore; Daphne Oxenford; Jimmy Hibbert; Martin Oldfield; Jane Dowell
- Theme music composer: Malcolm Arnold
- Opening theme: "Allegro non troppo", English Dances Set II, Op 33 (1969–2016)
- Country of origin: United Kingdom

Production
- Running time: 10–20 minutes
- Production company: Granada Television

Original release
- Network: Granada Television; Associated-Rediffusion; Scottish Television; Thames Television
- Release: 5 November 1956 – 28 October 1982
- Network: Channel 4
- Release: 4 November 1982 – 2 September 1988
- Network: ITV
- Release: 8 September 1988 – 21 December 1989
- Network: BBC 2
- Release: 16 March 1990 – 8 March 2008
- Network: BBC Radio 4
- Release: 4 April 2010 – 27 March 2016

What The Papers Say was a British radio and television series. It consisted of quotations from headlines and comment pages in the previous week's newspapers, read in a variety of voices and accents by actors. The quotes were linked by a script read by a studio presenter, usually a prominent journalist. The show did not have a regular host, and was intended as a wry look at how British broadsheets and tabloids covered the week's news stories. The programme was most recently broadcast on BBC Radio 4.

What The Papers Say originally ran for many years on television – its first incarnation (1956–2008) was the second longest-running programme on British television after Panorama. Having begun in 1956 on Granada Television and ITV, the television series moved to newly launched Channel 4 in 1982 and being shown to the network before briefly returning to ITV as part of the new night service in 1988 and then to BBC2 in 1990 before being discontinued in 2008. The programme was revived on Radio 4 in the run-up to the 2010 general election, and continued until 27 March 2016, when it was announced that that was its last Radio 4 episode.

The programme's format was the same for both television and radio. On TV, while quotes were being read, they would appear on-screen as newspaper cuttings under the relevant newspaper's masthead, and the presenter would read a script from the auto-prompt operator.

== History ==
Throughout its history, the television series was editorially based in Manchester by Granada Television. For the first 26 years of its run, the series was broadcast on ITV in London and the north-west, and carried at different times in its history by certain other regional ITV stations; it was never networked nationally.

The first programme, on 5 November 1956, was presented by Brian Inglis, then deputy editor of The Spectator; the following week Kingsley Martin, editor of the New Statesman, presented the show. Martin presented the show on six occasions; Inglis became the most frequent presenter with about 170 programmes. Originally the programme ran for 25 minutes, which was later reduced to 20.

In 1969, the programme was briefly relaunched as The Papers, with sociologist Stuart Hall as the first presenter. This version of the programme lasted for only 10 weeks, after which it reverted to its original title, and took on the format it retained, with a different presenter (almost always a journalist) each week.

The show moved from ITV to Channel 4 when the latter was launched in 1982, but dropped the series on 2 September 1988. It returned to ITV, although during the night-time slot, less than a week later until December 1989. In March 1990 BBC2 commissioned the series from Granada in May 1990, broadcasting it on Friday evening before switching to Saturday afternoons. The programme's running time was cut to 15 minutes, and later to 10. (What the Papers Say was the first ever Granada TV commission for the BBC, and had been the only surviving programme from the Manchester-based broadcaster's inception in 1956).

The BBC decided in 2008 not to recommission the series, also dropping coverage of the annual What the Papers Say Awards. ITV Productions stated it hoped to find a "new home" for the show. In October 2008, the same format made a partial return to screens during Granada's own regional political programme Party People, where it was usually introduced as "a look at what the papers say". The programme was revived by BBC Radio 4 in April 2010.

On 17 February 2010, the BBC announced What the Papers Say would be revived on BBC Radio 4, with 12 editions being broadcast under the working title "What the Election Papers Say" in the run-up to the 2010 general election. The 12-part revival was regarded a success by former Radio 4 controller Mark Damazer, who commissioned the programme as a permanent addition to the station's schedule at 22.45 on Sundays as the last segment of The Westminster Hour.

The radio programmes were recorded at the Westminster BBC's New Broadcasting House studios. Presenters of the BBC Radio 4 programme included The Spectator's editor Fraser Nelson, the Daily Mirror's Kevin Maguire, The Guardian's Michael White, The Observer's Andrew Rawnsley and John Kampfner.

== Critical acclaim ==
In its most recent incarnation, the programme received a warm reception from critics, including The Daily Telegraph's Gillian Reynolds, who wrote, "Three cheers for whoever thought of rescuing What the Papers Say. The old essay format, where the presenter writes a script linking illustrative extracts from the week's press, still bursts with life. All the presenters so far have kept it sharp and spiky, the extract readers are full of gusto, production and editing are first-rate. It's an espresso in a Horlicks world".

David Brockman wrote: "What is universally accepted is that Granada's What The Papers Say Awards, decided annually and first established in 1957, are among the most prestigious in the entire world of journalism".

== Music ==
The show's theme music was originally The Procession of the Sardar, by Mikhail Ippolitov-Ivanov, a student of Rimsky-Korsakov. Later, it was replaced by Allegro Non Troppo, the first movement from Malcolm Arnold's Second Set of English Dances Opus 33. The ten programmes titled The Papers used the Gershwin Piano Concerto in F as opening and closing music; when it reverted to the original title, it was replaced again by the Arnold work, which was also used for the revived programme on radio.

== Voices ==
In its original television format, actors reading the excerpts from the papers, out of vision, included Peter Wheeler (who narrated the introduction to Granada Television's Crown Court series), Daphne Oxenford, Ray Moore and Barrie Hesketh.

The regular voices of BBC Radio 4's What the Papers Say were:

- Frances Jeater, whose long and varied career has included performances with the Royal Shakespeare Company and National Theatre, as well as theatres across the UK and USA. Her television credits include roles in Where the Heart Is, Wycliffe and A Wing and A Prayer. She is a past member of the BBC Radio Drama Company.
- Steve Hodson, veteran stage and screen actor, who may be best known for his role as Steve Ross on the 1970s children's television series Follyfoot. In addition to his vast stage and radio acting credentials, Hodson has recorded around 250 audio books.
- Rachel Atkins, who has worked extensively in theatre and television with credits ranging from EastEnders to BBC One's Doctors. She has also been a member of the BBC Radio Drama Company. Atkins can currently be heard as the voice of Vicky Tucker on The Archers.
- Laurence Dobiesz made his radio debut in What the Papers Say. Having graduated from the Oxford School of Drama in 2008, Dobiesz has built up a portfolio of theatre credits including Twelfth Night with the Royal Shakespeare Company, Mad Forest and Paradise Lost at Southwark Playhouse. His TV credits include The Bill and Outlander.
- Graham Seed trained at RADA and is best known for his role playing Nigel Pargetter in the BBC Radio series The Archers from 1983 until January 2011. In addition to The Archers, Seed has appeared in Brookside, Coronation Street and Crossroads. Seed also appeared in I, Claudius, Good and Bad at Games, Brideshead Revisited, Edward the Seventh, Bergerac, Midsomer Murders and Wild Target.
