= Malia Johnston =

New Zealand choreographer and dance director

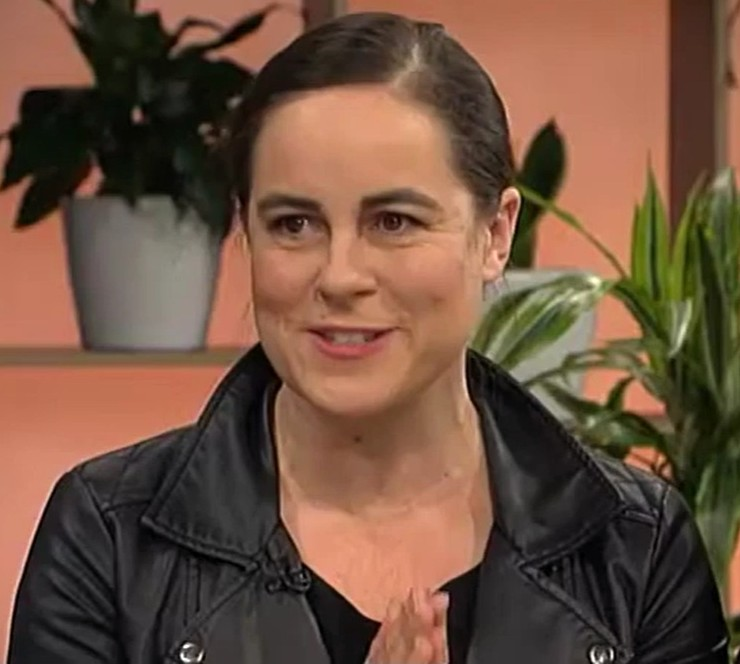
Johnston in 2017

Malia Johnston is a New Zealand choreographer and dance director who has created works for many of New Zealand's dance companies including Footnote Dance, the New Zealand Dance Company, and events such as the World of Wearable Arts and the centenary of the Armistice of 11 November 1918.

== Biography ==
Johnston has been artistic director for the World of Wearable Art Awards show since 2001. She directed the World of Wearable Art show which travelled to Hong Kong's International Arts Festival in 2012 and was creative director for the 30th anniversary season in 2018.

Johnston is a guest choreographer and tutor at the New Zealand School of Dance and a tutor in dance at Unitec Institute of Technology.

Companies that Johnston has choreographed for include Footnote Dance and the New Zealand Dance Company. She is one of the founders of the company Movement Of The Human.

Directing and choreographing performances for large public outdoor events is an area Johnston works in. In 2018 this included a performance at Pukeahu National War Memorial Park called He Wawa Waraki: Roaring Chorus for the New Zealand Ministry of Culture and Heritage that commemorated the armistice that marked the end of World War I. In 2021 Johnston directed the opening of The Performance Arcade What if the City Was a Theatre? programme in Wellington which was a collaboration with Johnston's company Movement of the Human, kapa haka group Hiwa, Wellington Opera, and singer Sharn Te Pou.

== Awards ==
- 2013 Creative New Zealand Choreographic Fellowship.
- 2018 Director of the Year, Wellington Theatre Awards for RUSHES (New Zealand Festival in association with Te Papa: Museum of New Zealand) and Meremere, a solo autobiographical show featuring Rodney Bell. Both produced by MOTH at Circa Theatre.
