= Margaret Hill (dancer) =

British ballerina

Margaret Hill (1929 - 30 December 1975) was a British ballerina, a principal dancer with the Royal Ballet.

Hill studied at the Rambert Dance Company which she joined in 1944 at the age of 15 where she went on to become a soloist and a principal dancer. She joined the Royal Ballet in 1952.

Sir Peter Wright described Hill as "a superb artist who joined the company from Rambert, but who did not really fit into the required Royal Ballet mould".

Hill appeared in Kenneth MacMillan's first choreographed work, Somnabulism in 1953, alongside Maryon Lane. However, Hill fell ill at the last minute, and MacMillan himself danced her role, improvising his own choreography as he went. Nonetheless, the ballet was "a triumph", and it was televised by the BBC in 1954 under its new title, The Dreamers.

Hill later returned to the Rambert Dance Company in 1953 for two years after which she returned to The Royal Ballet in 1956.

She had a close relationship with Kenneth MacMillan, and he created Solitaire for her in 1956. Wright and The Guardian note that Hill was his first muse, but that Lynn Seymour was to supplant her in his affections and become more enduring and famous.

Hill's first marriage was to Leonard Dommet, a violinist, at the age of 19. She later married fellow ballet dancer Michael Boulton (who was in the original cast for Solitaire) in 1959, with whom she has a son and a daughter.
