= Maungawhau School =

Location
- Ellerton Road, Mt Eden, Auckland; 36.8914°S 174.7540°E

Information
- Type: State co-educational primary (Year 1–6)
- Motto: Latin: Tonus Facit Musicam; It is tone that makes music
- Established: 1912
- Ministry of Education Institution no.: 1367
- Principal: Delanee Dale
- Enrolment: 654 (July 2026)
- Socio-economic decile: 10
- Website: maungawhau.school.nz

Maungawhau School is a primary school in the suburb of Mt Eden, Auckland, New Zealand. It caters for boys and girls from Year 1 to Year 6.

== School history ==
The site for the school was purchased from Joughin Farm and Manderville Estate in 1911. The first building was erected in 1912, and the first students were taught in 1913. Over the years, the school has purchased surrounding land for new buildings. Existing buildings have been replaced or renovated.

== School fair ==
The school holds a fair annually. Some of the stalls have included lolly leis, Chocolate Demise, jams and preserves, books and clothes.

== Notable students ==
- Rowena Jackson (born 1926), prima ballerina
