= Suzie Moncrieff =

New Zealand sculptor and arts entrepreneur

Dame Suzie Moncrieff DNZM
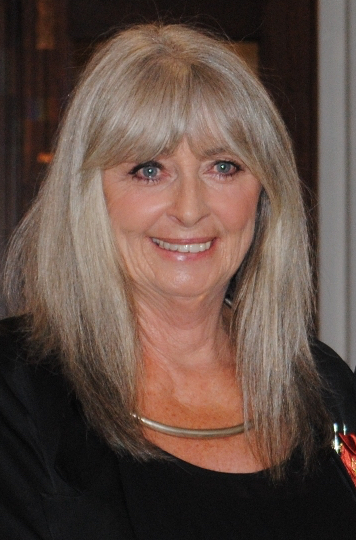
- Moncrieff in 2012
- Born: Suzanne Elizabeth Dick; 1948 or 1949 (age 77–78); Hope, New Zealand
- Occupations: Sculptor and arts entrepreneur
- Known for: Founder, World of Wearable Art show

Dame Suzie Moncrieff DNZM (born Suzanne Elizabeth Dick, 1948 or 1949) is a New Zealand sculptor and arts entrepreneur, and the founder of the World of Wearable Art show (WOW).

== Early life ==
Moncrieff was born in 1948 or 1949, at Hope, near Nelson, New Zealand, one of four children of Dorothy and Jack Dick, a sawmill owner. Both Dorothy and Jack were artists and performers — Dorothy painted, sang, acted and performed in comedy shows, and Jack played the piano and had his own dance band. As a child, Moncrieff created her own plays, painting the sets and drawing the characters as well.

Moncrieff studied at Waimea College, Richmond, and particularly enjoyed art and sculpting. Although she wanted to be an artist, her application to art school was declined and instead she enrolled to study at Christchurch Teachers' College. She didn't enjoy it and returned to Nelson after about 14 months. She worked in a psychiatric hospital and returned to sculpting in her 30s.

After two marriages and two divorces, friends encouraged Moncrieff to change her surname to something of her own choosing. She chose "Moncrieff", a name from her mother's Shetland Islands ancestry.

== Career ==
Moncrieff's first sculpture exhibition was held in Wellington in the early 1980s. She was disappointed by the high fees the gallery charged her, and decided to open her own gallery. She and six other artists joined together and bought a dilapidated old cottage, Cobb Cottage, on the main road out of Nelson, and named the gallery the William Higgins Gallery after the man who built it. The building was added to the Heritage New Zealand Pouhere Taonga List in 1986 as a Category 1 historic place. As it was outside of town, she decided to promote the gallery by running an annual sculpture competition. The prize money was donated by the company which had sold Moncrieff the cottage; however, the firm was later bought out by a multinational company and the prize money withdrawn. As an alternative promotion, Moncrieff organised the first WOW show in 1987. It was a stage show combining wearable art, theatre and dance, and held at Cobb Cottage with an audience of 200.

The show became so successful that in 2005 Moncrieff moved it to Wellington in order to have a larger venue. The show has sold out every year it has been staged, and a 2009 study estimated that the show contributes $15 million to the city's economy.

In 2012, a 70-minute show was presented at the Hong Kong Arts Festival.

Moncrieff and her sister Heather Palmer sold WOW to New Zealand resident Japanese businessman Hideaki Fukutake in 2022.

== Honours and awards ==
In the 1998 Queen's Birthday Honours, Moncrieff was appointed an Officer of the New Zealand Order of Merit, for services to the arts and tourism. She was promoted to Dame Companion of the same order, for services to the arts, in the 2012 New Year Honours.

Moncrieff was named Wellingtonian of the Year in the arts category in 2011. The following year she was a finalist in the 2012 New Zealander of the Year awards, and in 2014 she was awarded an honorary Doctor of Fine Arts degree by Massey University. In 2015 she received a Deloitte top 200 visionary leader award.
