= Royal New Zealand Ballet =

National ballet company of New Zealand

- Formation: 1953; 73 years ago
- Type: Ballet company
- Location: New Zealand
- Artistic director: Ty King-Wall
- Website: rnzb.org.nz

The Royal New Zealand Ballet is a ballet company based in Wellington, New Zealand. It was originally known as The New Zealand Ballet Company.

== History ==
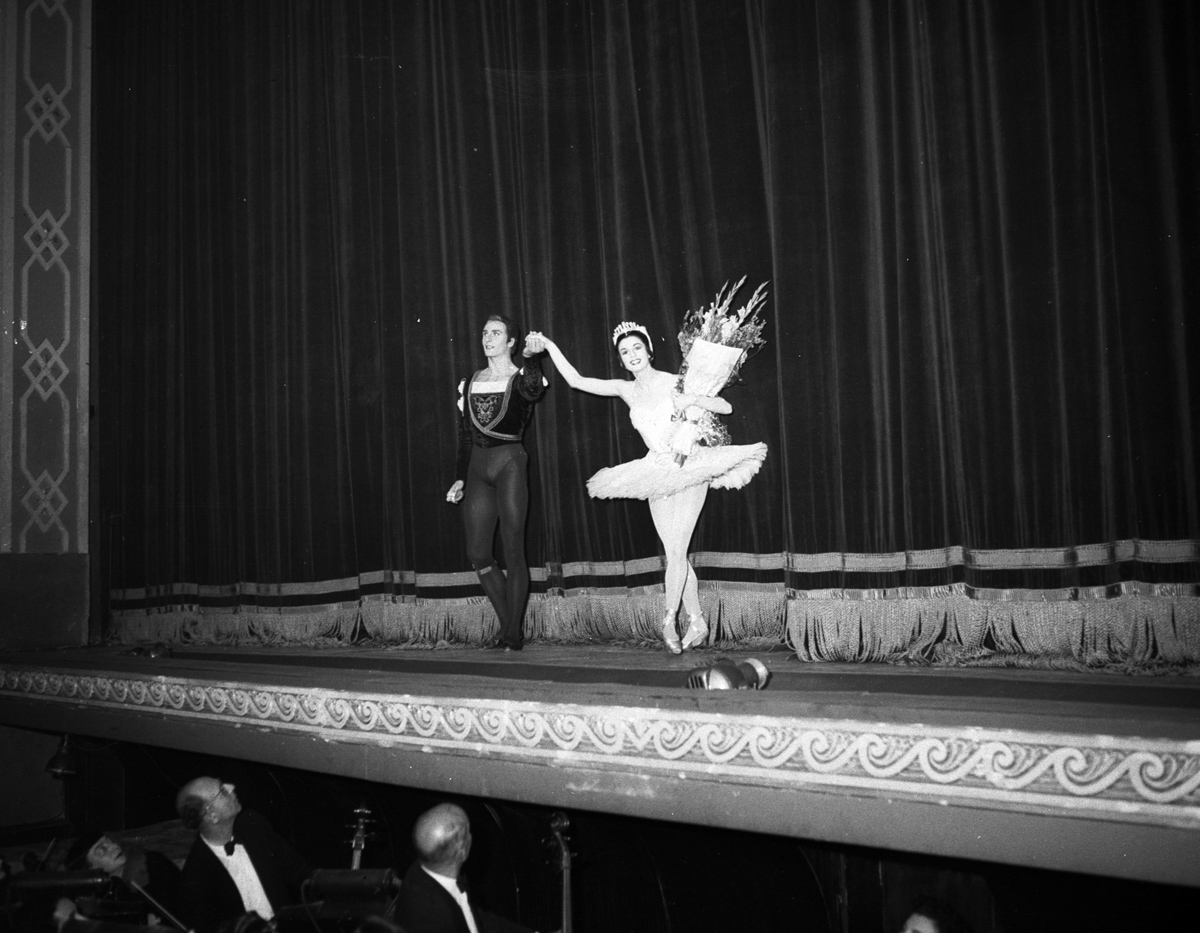
Rowena Jackson and Philip Chatfield - curtain call of Royal Ballet's Swan Lake, Sydney, 1958

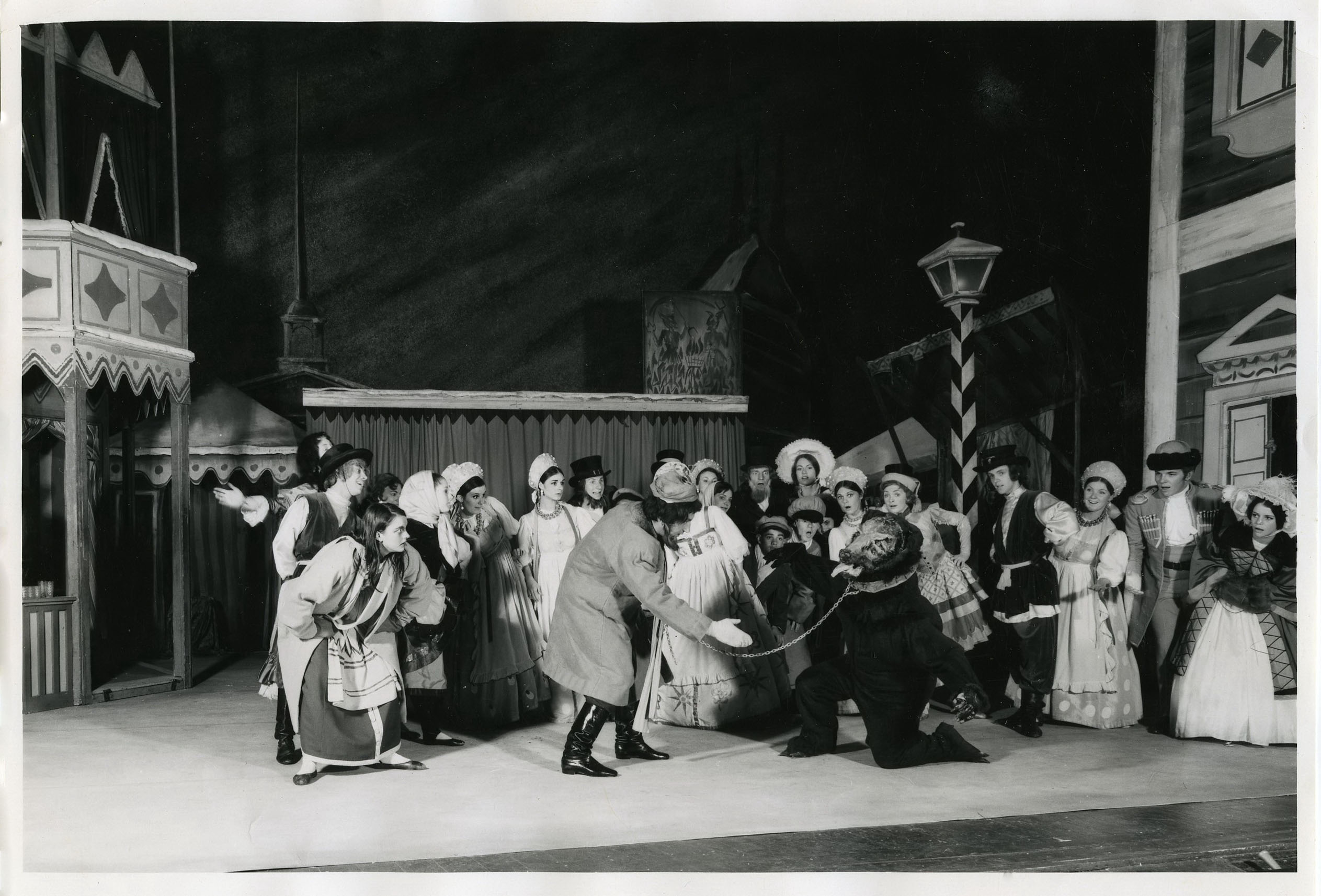
Petrouchka, Wellington 1967 (19250224396)

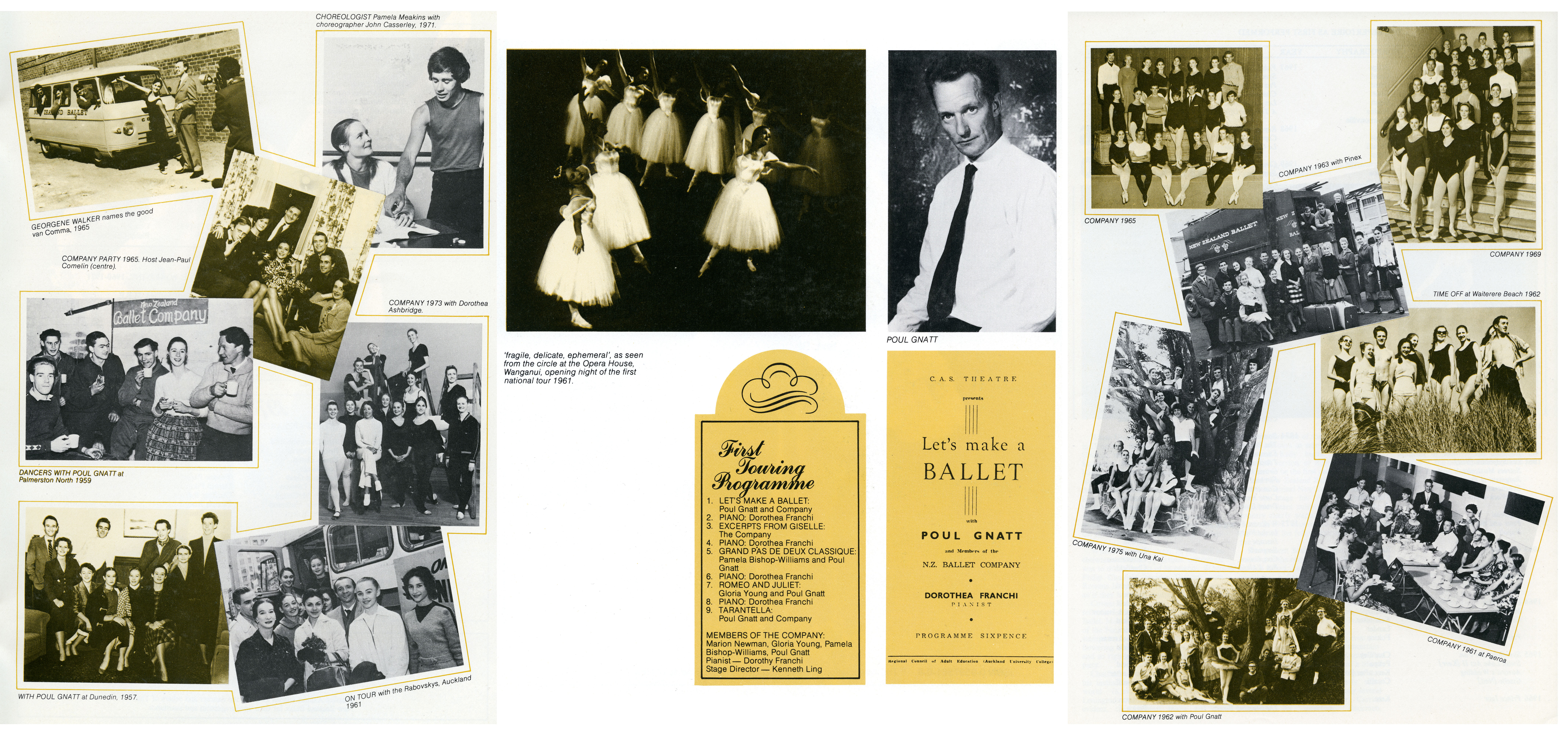
Royal New Zealand Ballet Photographs (9205305320)

New Zealand Ballet was established in 1953 as an independent charitable trust by Royal Danish Ballet Principal Poul Gnatt, Beryl Nettleton, Bettina Edwards, another female dancer, and pianist Dorothea Franchi.

In the late 1950s notable New Zealand dancers Rowena Jackson and Philip Chatfield, her English dancer husband, returned from overseas to join the company. A third returning dancer, Russell Kerr, had been dancing in Europe with the Jose Greco Company since 1950, Sadlers Wells Ballet and Ballet Rambert, and from 1952 to 1957 with London Festival Ballet as their principal character dancer. In 1959 Kerr joined forces with NZ Ballet director Poul Gnatt, bringing with him a number of dancers from his own company, Auckland Ballet Theatre, for the 1959–60 season. As United Ballet, the augmented company presented a ground-breaking season which prefigured the things to come. Included amongst the classical works was a major contemporary work, "Prismatic Variations, a collaborative piece between Gnatt and Kerr, with guest artists the celebrated New Zealand dancers Rowena Jackson and Sara Neil.

In 1962 Jon Trimmer returned to the company after studying at the Royal Ballet School in London and performing with the Sadlers Wells Company. He remains a leading artist with the company in 2007 and has performed many character roles over the last 20 years. Russell Kerr succeeded Gnatt as company director from 1962 to 1969.

In the 1960s and 70s the company survived by touring extensively throughout the country. It has been directly funded by the New Zealand government (currently through the Ministry for Culture and Heritage) since 1998.

In 1980 The Nutcracker was performed choreographed by Patricia Rianne and popular despite being described as being 'staged on a shoestring'.

In 1984 Her Majesty, Queen Elizabeth II as Queen of New Zealand granted the title Royal to the company making it the fourth ballet company to receive this honour, along with The Royal Ballet, Birmingham Royal Ballet and Royal Winnipeg Ballet.

A production drawing from Māori culture toured to China in 1985. This work was called Moko, and was choreographed by Gaylene Sciascia and designed by Sandy Adsett.

The 2000 programme included Dracula that was marketed with the slogan, ‘Go to the Bloody Ballet’ and Ihi FrENZy that had a first half by kapa haka champions Te Matarae I Orehu and a second half with dance to the music of New Zealand pop band Split Enz with costumes design by Tracy Grant Lord.

In 2006 the company had 32 dancers, and in 2016 had 36. It performed nationally and overseas.

=== Current ===
In 2011, Ethan Stiefel (USA) became Artistic Director, and brought his partner, American Ballet Theatre principal dancer Gillian Murphy, as a guest dancer and coach to the company during his tenure. In November 2014 Francesco Ventriglia (Italy) became Artistic Director. In June 2017 he was replaced by Patricia Barker (USA). Lester McGrath is the Executive Director. In 2024 the Artistic Director is New Zealander Ty King-Wall, the first New Zealander to hold the position since Bryan Ashbridge, and the Executive Director is Tobias Perkins.

In 2021 the Royal New Zealand Ballet received extra government funding with a payout of $1.157m after a budget freeze since 2016 and given in part because of the Covid-19 pandemic. This means the dancers' salaries have increased to at least the living wage to the end of 2022.

There is ongoing controversy about the number of New Zealand dancers in the dance company of the Royal New Zealand Ballet, many being from overseas. Former members Dawn Sanders, Gray Veredon, Patricia Rianne, Nick Carroll and Anne Rowse are critical of processes and some suggesting a quota of New Zealand dancers.

In more recent years The Royal New Zealand Ballet commissioned two original ballets, Hansel & Gretel and Cinderella in 2019 and 2022 respectively. The music for both productions was composed by Claire Cowan, while the choreography was created by Loughlan Prior.

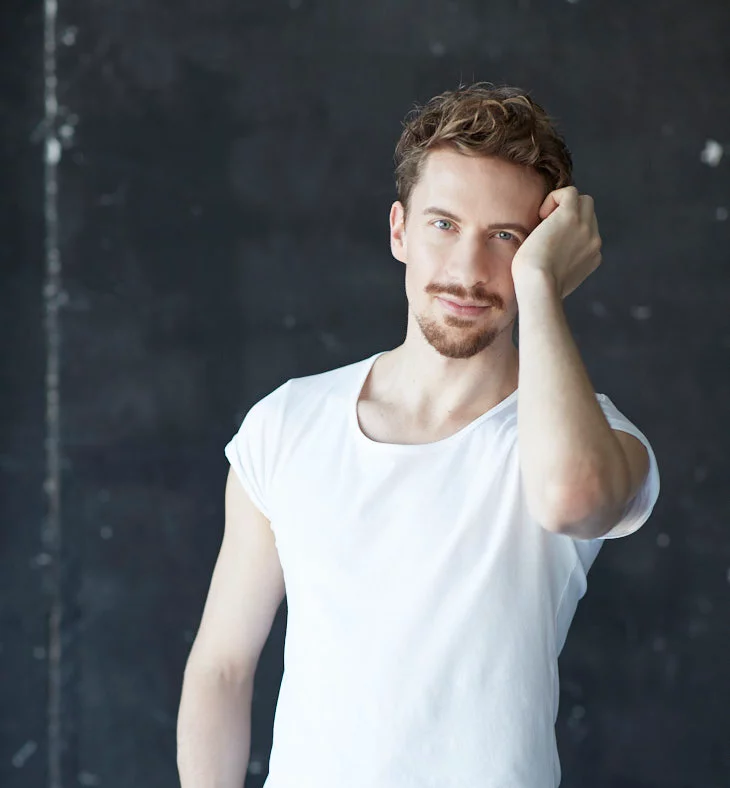
Loughlan Prior - choreographer in residence 2021

== Programme ==
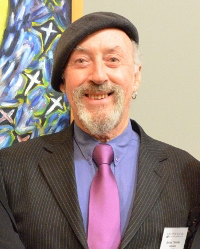
Sir Jon Trimmer - many time performer

Choreographers in residence listed in 2021 are Loughlan Prior, Shaun James Kelly, Corey Baker and Sarah Foster-Sproull. In 2021 the programme includes Stravinsky's The Firebird choreographed by Loughlan Prior with Tracy Grant Lord designing.

== Some of the dancers ==
- June Kerr (1959 - 60)
- Abigail Boyle (since 2005)
- Adriana Harper (2005–15), subsequently assistant to magician Andre Vegas
- Alayna Ng
- Bronte Kelly
- Clytie Campbell (2005–16), in 2017 became Ballet Mistress under Francesco Ventriglia
- Harry Skinner (2008–17)
- Jacob Chown (2006–17)
- Sir Jon Trimmer
- Joseph Skelton (since 2011)
- Katherine Skelton (née Grange) (since 2010)
- Kilian O'Callaghan (1988-1989 Soloist, 1990-1994 Principal Dancer)
- Kohei Iwamoto (2010–17), then Queensland Ballet as a soloist
- Laura Saxon Jones (2013–17)
- Leonie Leahy
- Loughlan Prior (since 2010)
- Lucy Green (2010–16), then Queensland Ballet as a soloist and subsequently Principal Dancer
- Maclean Hopper
- Madeleine Graham (since 2013)
- Mayu Tanigaito (since 2012)
- Nadia Yanowsky (since 2018)
- Paul Mathews (since 2006)
- Rory Fairweather-Neylan (2007–2015)
- Shaun James Kelly (Since 2014)
- Tonia Looker (2008–17), subsequently Queensland Ballet
- Yang Liu (since 2010)
- Qi Huan (2005-2014)
- Ginny Gan (2011-2014)
- Gillian Murphy (2011-2014) American Ballet Theatre-Principal Soloist

== See also ==
- List of New Zealand organisations with royal patronage
