= Malcolm Arnold =

English composer (1921–2006)

Sir Malcolm Arnold

Sir Malcolm Henry Arnold CBE (21 October 1921 – 23 September 2006) was an English composer and conductor. His works feature music in many genres, including a cycle of nine symphonies, numerous concertos, concert works, chamber music, choral music and music for brass band and wind band. His style is tonal and rejoices in lively rhythms, brilliant orchestration, and an unabashed tunefulness. He wrote extensively for the theatre, with five ballets specially commissioned by the Royal Ballet, as well as two operas and a musical. He also composed scores for more than a hundred films, among these The Bridge on the River Kwai (1957), for which he won the Academy Award for Best Original Score for that year.

== Early life ==
Malcolm Arnold was born in Northampton, Northamptonshire, England, the youngest of five children from a prosperous Northampton family of shoemakers. Although shoemakers, his family was full of musicians; both of his parents were pianists, and his aunt was a violinist. His great-great-grandfather was the composer William Hawes, a choirmaster at the Chapel Royal. After seeing Louis Armstrong play in Bournemouth, he took up the trumpet at the age of 12, and five years later won a scholarship to the Royal College of Music.

At the RCM he studied composition with Gordon Jacob and the trumpet with Ernest Hall. In 1941, he joined the London Philharmonic Orchestra (LPO) as second trumpet and became principal trumpet in 1943.

In 1941 he registered as a conscientious objector, and was initially exempted from military service conditional upon joining the National Fire Service, but in the event he was allowed to continue in the LPO. In 1944, after his brother in the Royal Air Force had been killed, he volunteered for military service. When the army put him in a military band he shot himself in the foot to get back to civilian life; he remained in touch with the CO movement, giving a trumpet recital at the 1946 New Year party of the Central Board for Conscientious Objectors. After a season as principal trumpet with the BBC Symphony Orchestra, he returned in 1946 to the London Philharmonic, where he remained until 1948, leaving to become a full-time composer.

== Career ==
Arnold began his career playing trumpet professionally, but by the age of 30 his life was devoted to composition. He was ranked with Benjamin Britten as one of the most sought-after composers in Britain. His natural melodic gift earned him a reputation as a composer of light music in works such as some of his concert overtures and the sets of Welsh, English, Scottish, Irish and Cornish dances.

He was also a highly successful composer of film music, penning the scores to over a hundred features and documentaries, including titles such as The Bridge on the River Kwai, Hobson's Choice and the St Trinian's series. His nine symphonies are often deeply personal and show a more serious side to his work, which has proved more controversial; his final symphony, for example, is so bleak in mood and sparse in orchestration that it was not publicly performed until six years after its composition. Arnold also wrote a variety of concertos and chamber works, as well as music for the theatre including major ballets.

== Later years and death ==
By 1961, Arnold had a reputation for being unpleasant, frequently drunk and highly promiscuous. He divorced his first wife in that year. His second wife took out a court order after they separated. After their divorce, he made two suicide attempts.

His later years saw a decline in both his health and his finances. In 1978, he was treated as an in-patient for several months in the acute psychiatric ward at the Royal Free Hospital, Pond Street, London, and in 1979 he entered St Andrew's Hospital in his hometown of Northampton to be treated for depression and alcoholism.

Between 1979 and 1986 he was formally in the care of the Court of Protection. However, despite this, and being given only a year to live in the early 1980s, he recovered and lived for 22 more years, albeit with a carer, Anthony Day. In this period he completed his Ninth and final symphony in 1986.

By the time of his 70th birthday in 1991 his artistic reputation with the general public was recovering and he was even able to enjoy a triumphant appearance on the stage of the Royal Albert Hall to receive an ovation after a Proms performance of his Guitar Concerto.

Arnold died at the Norfolk and Norwich University Hospital, Norwich, on 23 September 2006, aged 84, after suffering from a chest infection. That same day his last work, The Three Musketeers, was premiered in a Northern Ballet production at the Bradford Alhambra. (The score included no new music by Arnold, but excerpts from various of his compositions were arranged by John Longstaff. The original score was compiled by Anthony Meredith.)

The ownership of Arnold's original manuscripts was disputed after his death. Ultimately Anthony Day inherited half the royalties from Arnold's music and was awarded holiday pay. After Day died his share was transferred to Bunwell Primary School in Norfolk.

== Music ==
Arnold was a relatively conservative composer of tonal works, but a prolific and popular one. He acknowledged Hector Berlioz as an influence, alongside Gustav Mahler, Béla Bartók and jazz. Several commentators have drawn a comparison with Jean Sibelius. Arnold's most significant works are sometimes considered to be his nine symphonies. He also wrote a number of concertos, including one for guitar for Julian Bream, one for cello for Julian Lloyd Webber, one for viola, two for clarinet for Frederick Thurston and Benny Goodman, one for harmonica for Larry Adler and one – enthusiastically welcomed at its premiere during the 1969 Proms – for three hands on two pianos for the husband-and-wife team of Cyril Smith and Phyllis Sellick. His sets of dances – comprising two sets of English Dances (Opp. 27 and 33), along with one set each of Scottish Dances (Op. 59), Cornish Dances (Op. 91), Irish Dances (Op. 126), and Welsh Dances (Op. 138) – are mainly in a lighter vein and are popular both in their original orchestral guise and in later wind and brass band arrangements. The English Dances also form the basis for Kenneth MacMillan's short ballet Solitaire, and one of them has been used as the theme music for the British television programme What the Papers Say (the Cornish Dances has provided the theme music for the television programmes of the cook Rick Stein). Arnold also wrote some highly successful concert overtures, including Beckus the Dandipratt (an important stepping stone in his early career), the strikingly scored Tam o' Shanter (based on the famous Robert Burns poem), the rollicking A Grand Grand Overture (written for a Hoffnung Festival and featuring three vacuum cleaners and a floor polisher, all in turn polished off by a firing squad in a mock 1812 manner), and the dramatic Peterloo Overture (commissioned by the Trades Union Congress to commemorate the historic massacre of protesting workers in Manchester). Another popular short work is his Divertimento for Flute, Oboe and Clarinet (Op. 37). Arnold is also known for his relatively large number of compositions and arrangements of his own compositions for brass band. In 1954, Beckus the Dandipratt was given a radio studio performance by the BBC Symphony Orchestra under Leopold Stokowski, who was thanked by the composer for his "wonderful performance."

=== Film scores ===
A successful composer for the cinema, Malcolm Arnold was credited with having written over a hundred film scores for features and documentaries between 1947 and 1969. In 1957, Arnold won an Academy Award for the music to David Lean's film The Bridge on the River Kwai. His two other collaborations with David Lean were The Sound Barrier (1952) and Hobson's Choice (1954). The Inn of the Sixth Happiness (1958) won Arnold an Ivor Novello Award. Also during the 1950s – an especially prolific period for Arnold – he provided a series of scores for major British and American feature films, such as The Captain's Paradise (1953), The Sea Shall Not Have Them (1954), The Night My Number Came Up (1955), The Constant Husband (1955), I Am a Camera (1955), 1984 (1956), Trapeze (1956), A Hill in Korea (1956), Dunkirk (1958), The Key (1958) and The Roots of Heaven (1958). He also wrote the music for the entire series of St Trinian's films, including The Belles of St Trinian's (1954), which was a particular favourite with the composer. The films' introductory theme has echoes of "Lili Marleen", the iconic wartime song. His 1960s scores included The Angry Silence (1960), Tunes of Glory (1960), No Love for Johnnie (1961), Whistle Down the Wind (1961), The Inspector (1962), The Lion (1962), Nine Hours to Rama (1963), Tamahine (1963), The Chalk Garden (1964), The Thin Red Line (1964), Sky West and Crooked (1965), The Heroes of Telemark (1965), Africa Texas Style (1967) and The Reckoning (1970). His last film score was for the television movie version of David Copperfield (1969).

== Legacy ==
He was the President of the Rochdale Youth Orchestra until his death in September 2006. The Leicestershire Schools Symphony Orchestra made the first commercial recording of Arnold's Divertimento for the Pye label in July 1967 and regularly performed many of his works in the UK and abroad.

Arnold also conducted the orchestra in a 1963 De Montfort Hall concert that included his own English Dances and Tam O'Shanter. Malcolm Arnold wrote the Trevelyan Suite to mark the opening of Trevelyan College, University of Durham. His daughter was among the first intake of students. He conducted the Royal Philharmonic Orchestra in the live Royal Albert Hall recording of Jon Lord's Concerto for Group and Orchestra with Deep Purple in September, 1969.

The following year he conducted the premiere of Lord's Gemini Suite with Deep Purple and the Light Music Society at the Royal Festival Hall and in 1971 conducted the London Symphony Orchestra in the studio recording of Gemini Suite with various rock soloists.

Since the 1980s there have been frequent concerts and festivals dedicated to his music. In October of each year there is a Malcolm Arnold Festival in his birthplace Northampton, currently directed by the chairman of the Malcolm Arnold Society, Paul Harris. On 3 September 2010 the Malcolm Arnold Academy, a secondary school in Northampton, was opened; while in September 2014 the new Malcolm Arnold Preparatory Free School was opened.

As of 2020, the fate of an archive of material relating to the period between 1979 and 1986, when Arnold was in the care of the Court of Protection, is in question. Because the archive contains personal information, its current holders, the Ministry of Justice, have always refused access to it and wish to destroy it. Arnold's daughter, Katherine Arnold, and others have appealed for it to be retained and transferred to the National Archives. In a written answer to John Hayes MP on 17 November 2020, John Whittingdale, Minister of State at the Department for Culture, Media and Sport, stated that the fate of the records was under discussion between the Ministry of Justice, the National Archives and the Court of Protection, and that they were "not at imminent risk of destruction."

== Honours and awards ==
- 1937 – Scholarship to the Royal College of Music
- 1941 – Cobbett Competition, 2nd prize for Vita Abundans
- 1948 – Scholarship by the Royal Academy of Music's Mendelssohn Scholarship Foundation
- 1951 – Venice Film Festival 1st prize in the music documentary class for Science in the Orchestra
- 1958 – Academy Award for the music to The Bridge on the River Kwai
- 1959 – Ivor Novello Award for the music to The Inn of the Sixth Happiness
- 1969 – Honorary Doctorate, University of Exeter
- 1969 – Bard of Gorseth Kernow, taking the Bardic name Trompour ('Trumpeter').
- 1970 – Commander (CBE) of the Order of the British Empire
- 1982 – Honorary Doctorate, University of Durham
- 1983 – Fellowship of the Royal College of Music, London
- 1984 – Honorary Doctorate, University of Leicester
- 1985 – Honorary Member, Royal Academy of Music, London
- 1986 – Ivor Novello Award for Outstanding Services to British Music
- 1987 – Wavendon AllMusic Composer of the Year
- 1989 – Honorary Doctorate, Miami University of Ohio
- 1989 – Freedom of the Borough of Northampton
- 1992 – Fellowship of the Trinity College of Music, London
- 1993 – knighted for services to music
- 1994 – Honorary President, Victoria College of Music, London
- 1997 – Fellowship of the Royal Northern College of Music, Manchester
- 2001 – Fellowship of the British Academy of Songwriters, Composers and Authors
- 2003 – Honorary Doctorate, University of Winchester
- 2004 – Distinguished Musician Award, Incorporated Society of Musicians
- 2006 – Honorary Doctorate, University of Northampton

== Bibliography ==
- Burton-Page, Piers (1994). Philharmonic Concerto: The Life and Music of Sir Malcolm Arnold. London: Methuen. ISBN 978-0-413-45651-9.
- Cole, Hugo (1989). Malcolm Arnold: An Introduction to His Music. London: Faber & Faber. ISBN 978-0571100712.
- Craggs, Stewart R. (1998). Malcolm Arnold: A Bio-Bibliography. Bio Bibliographies in Music. Westport, CT: Greenwood Press. ISBN 978-0-313-29254-5.
- Jackson, Paul R. (2003). The Life and Music of Sir Malcolm Arnold: The Brilliant and the Dark. UK: Ashgate. ISBN 978-1859283813.
- Meredith, Anthony; Paul Harris (24 September 2004). Malcolm Arnold: Rogue Genius. UK: Thames / Elkin. ISBN 978-0-903413-54-1.
- Meredith, Anthony (2022). Malcolm Arnold: The Inside Story. London: The Book Guild Ltd. ISBN 978-1914471490.
- Poulton, Alan (1986). The Music of Malcolm Arnold: A Catalogue. UK: Thames / Elkin. ISBN 0571-100570.
- Poulton, Alan (29 January 2021). Malcolm Arnold – Catalogue of Works. UK: Malcolm Arnold Society. ISBN 979-8701911244.
- Poulton, Alan (28 April 2021). Rooted in Northampton: The Arnolds and the Haweses: Malcolm Arnold's family tree. UK: Malcolm Arnold Society. ISBN 979-8745128936.
- Schafer, (Raymond) Murray (1963). British Composers in Interview. UK: Faber & Faber.
- Thöne, Raphael D. (20 August 2007). Malcolm Arnold – A Composer of Real Music: Symphonic Writing, Style and Aesthetics. Entercom Saurus. ISBN 978-3-937748-06-1.
