= World of Wearable Art =

Annual design competition held in Wellington, New Zealand

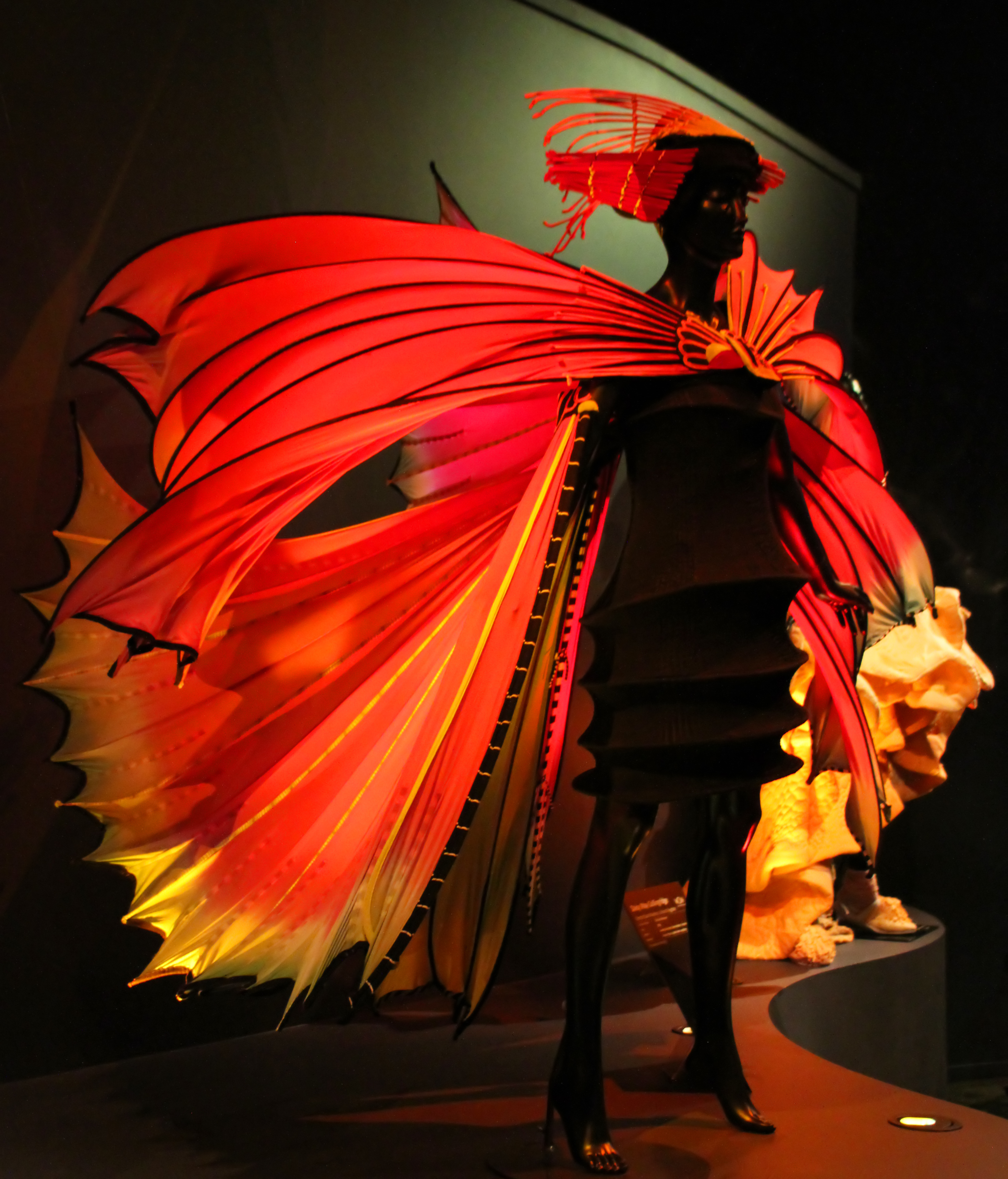
- Wearable art from Susan Holmes who has won 19 WOW awards.
- Genre: Wearable arts
- Begins: 1987
- Frequency: Annually
- Venue: TSB Arena
- Location: Wellington
- Country: New Zealand
- Founders: Suzie Moncrieff
- Participants: 80–100
- Attendance: 60,000
- Major events: Wearable art competition event with six section themes, with three recurring sections; Aotearoa, Avant-garde and Open, and three that change each year.

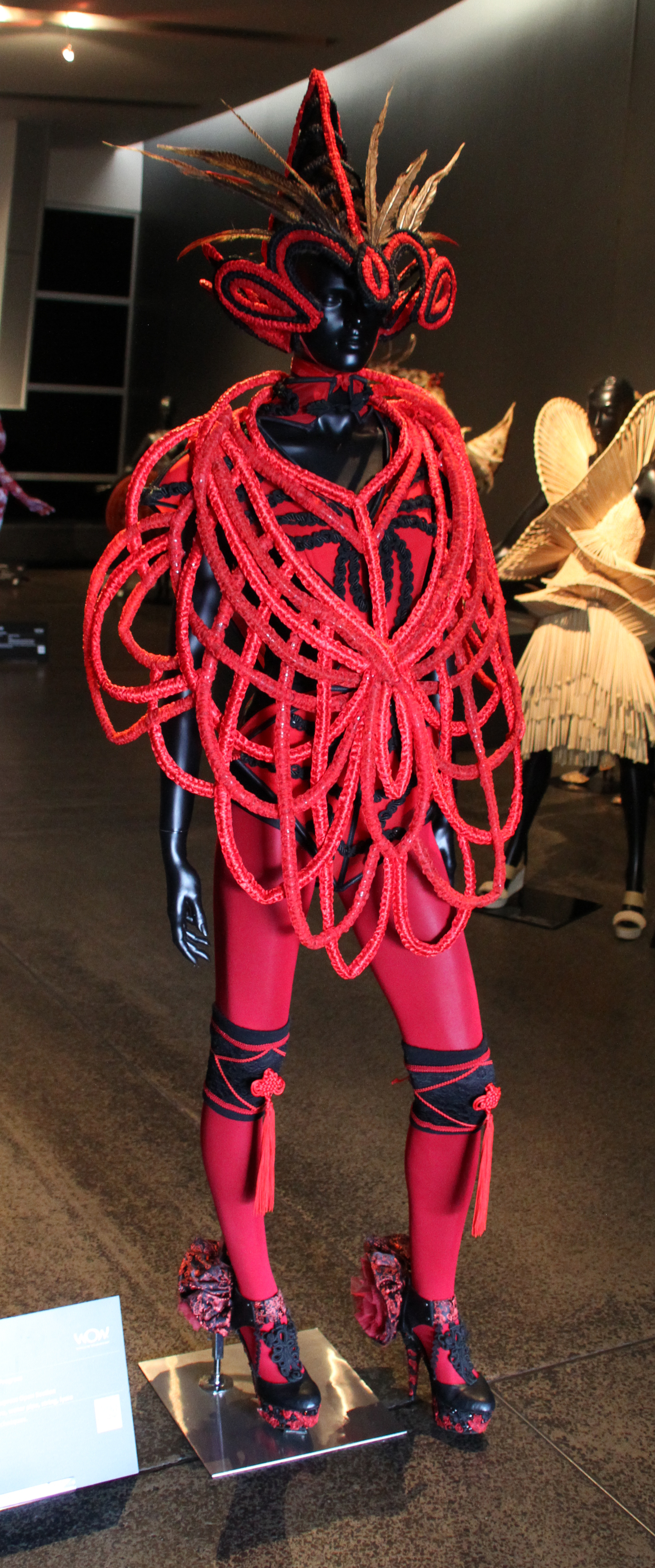
"Traditional Progress" (2016), designed by Tsz Kwan Au of Hong Kong.

World of WearableArt (WOW) is an international design competition with a corresponding event each year. It attracts entries from more than 40 countries each year. The competition features wearable art entries. Around 60,000 people attend the event in Wellington, New Zealand.

== History ==
WOW was founded in Nelson, New Zealand, as the World of Wearable Arts Awards in 1987 by Suzie Moncrieff. Moncreiff was a sculptor and her motivation was to promote artistry in the region. There was a rising movement in fibre art, and Pamela Elliott of the Compendium Gallery in Auckland was hosting fashion shows in the 80s with weaving, tie-dying and batik that Moncreiff visited. Moncreiff's vision however was for a more sculptural art. Her vision was also to activate community creativity. The brief for the early WOW awards was to 'take art off the walls and adorn the body in wildly wonderful ways'.

The first show of WOW was at William Higgins Gallery in Nelson in 1987 and was attended by 200 people. In 1990 the show moved to Trafalgar Centre. In 2005 WOW moved to Wellington as it became too big to hold in Nelson. It is a very popular event to attend.

WoW's main draw card was its uniqueness; it's this uniqueness that drew in crowds year after year – Moncrieff (2015).

The Gala show for 2020 was cancelled due to COVID-19 and was replaced by an exhibit in Wellington. It returned in 2022.

Moncrieff's sister Heather Palmer was the competition director. In 2022 Moncrieff and Palmer sold WOW to Japanese New Zealand businessman Hideaki Fukutake. Moncrieff and Palmer remain as WOW Ambassadors.

Meg Williams, formerly executive director of the New Zealand Festival of the Arts, was appointed WOW's chief executive in 2023.

== Competition ==
The competition features wearable art entries, which are judged on originality and innovation, the concept, the quality of construction, health and safety for the models, and performance potential. It is an international competition and attracts over 80 entries each year, for example there were 90 selected finalists in 2024 and 85 in 2025.

In 2025 there were entries selected from many countries including in the region Australia, Hong Kong, India, Malaysia, Taiwan, Vietnam and Japan, and also further afield Belgium, Canada and Switzerland.

Entries open in November and close in February the following year. Preliminary selection is made in March and delivery of the garments is in June. The final selection for the competition and the show is at the end of June. Judging occurs over August and early September. The awards night is the first night of the WOW event.

The competitors enter different sections or themes and there are six. Three are recurring; Aotearoa, Avant-garde and Open, and three themes change each year. The Bizarre Bra section returned in 2026.

There are seven WOW staff members who support the competition aspect of WOW.

== Event ==
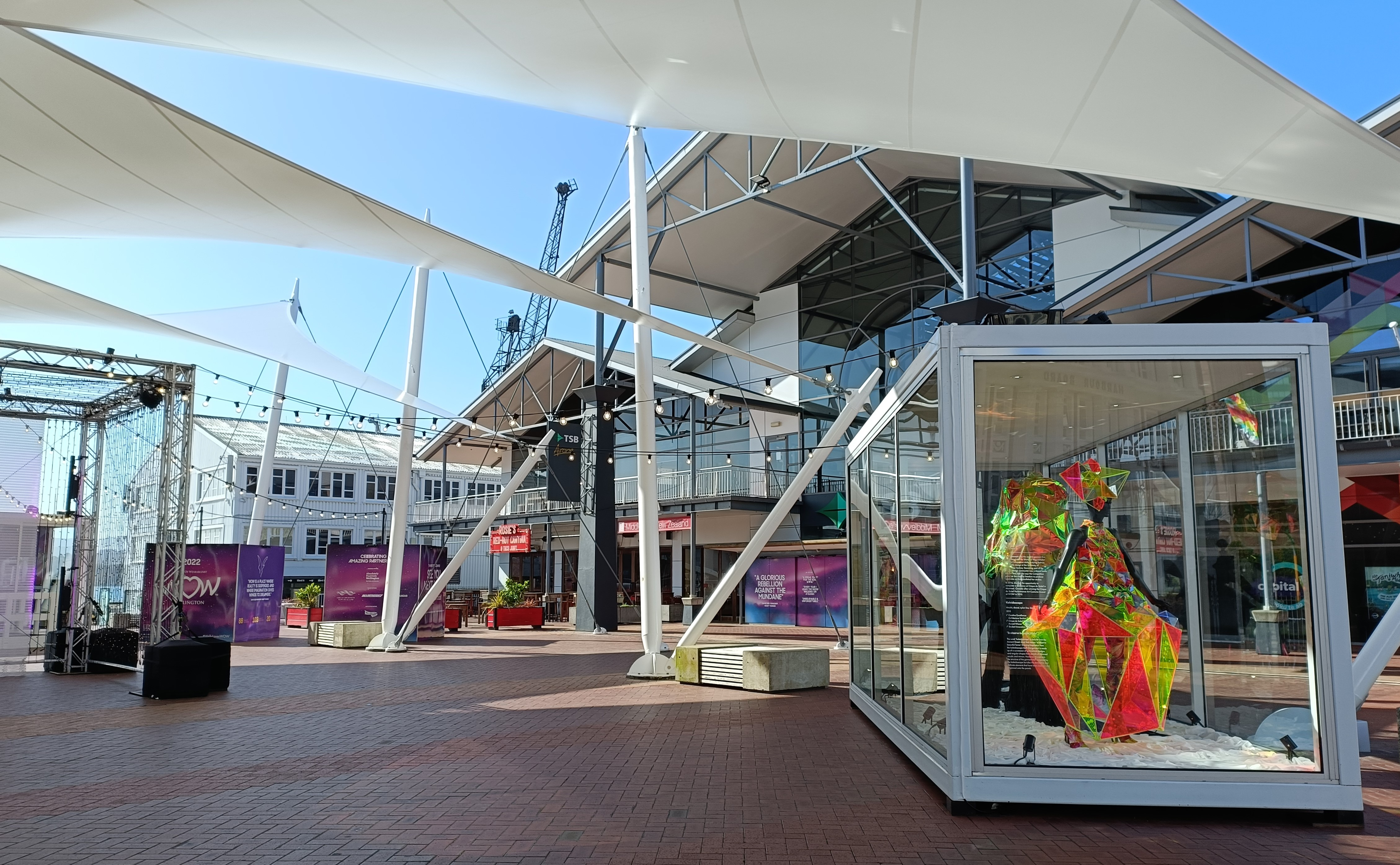
Entrance to the TSB Arena during WOW

The WOW event has a season of two and a half weeks of performances, held at the TSB Arena on Wellington's Waterfront. More than 60,000 people attend and many of them come to Wellington for the show. It is estimated that WOW visitors bring NZ$32.6 million to the city. In 2026 the event is being held at the end of September.

The vision of the performances is shaped by a creative team that has included Malia Johnston as an Artistic Director and Show Director since 2001, Rowan Pierce, designing AV content, and music composition by Eden Mulholland since 2020 and Brian Burke as Executive Creative Director. Guest choreographers who have worked on WOW include in 2019, Sarah Foster-Sproull, and in 2024 Tānemahuta Gray.

Models wear the garments which are presented in the competition themes. Alongside this are entertainers, choreography, music, aerial displays, visuals and lighting. In 2011 there was a Kiwi Icons section and it included performer Ginette McDonald as a camp mother, and John Rowles who sang “Ten Guitars”.

The show in 2023 featured headline artists Deva Mahal, Zoe Moon, Taiaroa Royal, Jaxson Cook, and DJ Aroha Harawira. In 2025 the headline artists were young vocalists from New Zealand: Riiki Reid, Tusekah, Lila Crichton, RV Quijano and Mackenzie Htay. Singers Jason Chasland, Katherine Winitana and Jasmine Jessen performed in the 2026 show.

== Exhibitions ==
The World of WearableArt and Classic Cars Collection exhibited garments from the World of WearableArt Awards Show, along with a collection of around 140 classic cars in Nelson, New Zealand from 2001 until it was closed due to pressures resulting from COVID-19 in May 2020. The vehicle side of the collection remained and was reopened on the same site in August 2020 as the Nelson Classic Car Museum.

In 2012 there was a three-year touring exhibition featuring designs from the 2000s. Te Papa held an exhibition called World of WearableArt – Up Close from 12 December 2020 – 14 February 2021 that featured garments from WOW.

An exhibition of over 50 garments is planned for 2027 to mark 40 years of WOW. The exhibition will open in Wellington at the Tākina convention centre before travelling internationally to Australia, the US and Europe. It will be partially financed by a grant from the government's Major Events Fund.
