= Rowena Jackson =

New Zealand dancer (1926–2024)

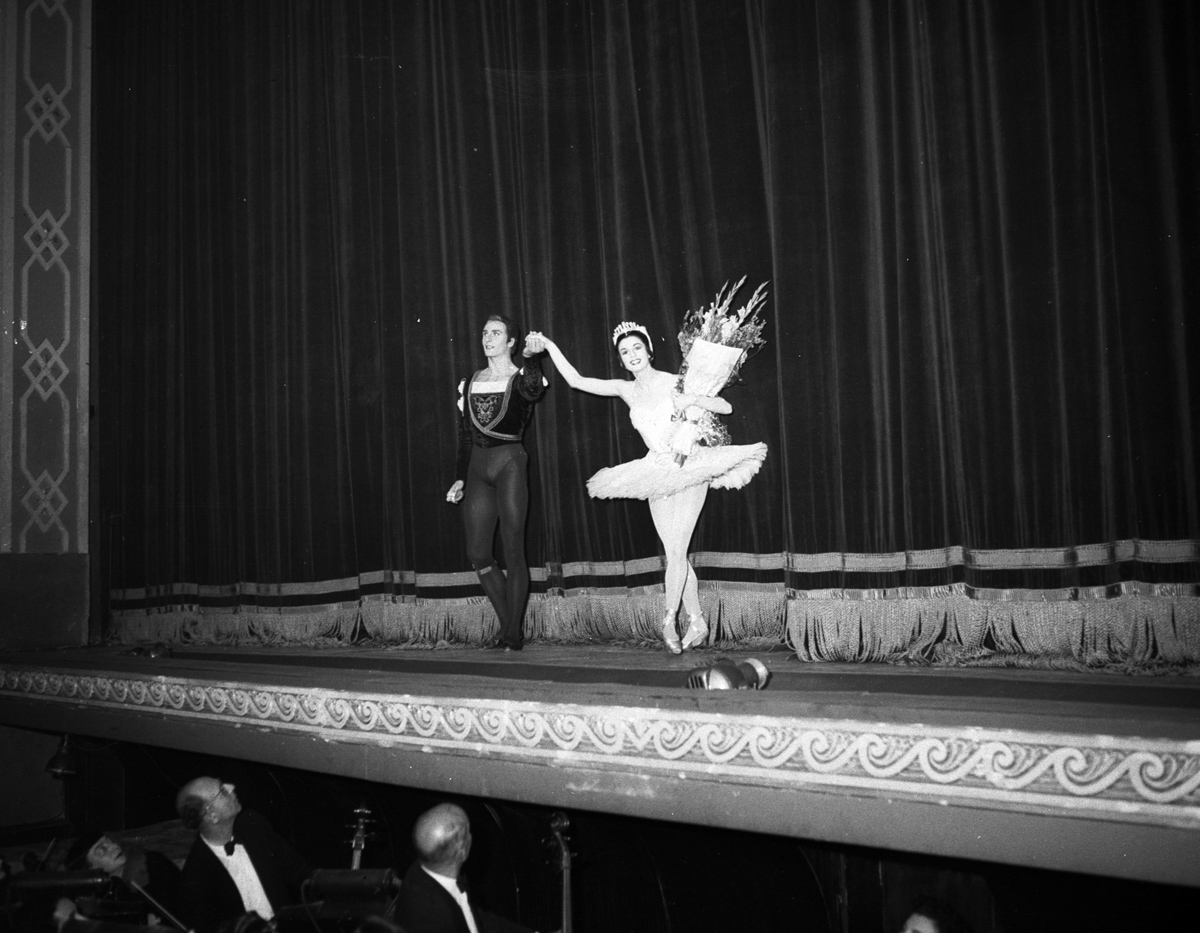
Curtain call on the opening night of The Royal Ballet's Swan Lake, with Rowena Jackson, at the Empire Theatre, Sydney, 11 September 1958

Rowena Othlie Chatfield MBE (née Jackson; 24 March 1926 – 15 August 2024) was a New Zealand prima ballerina.

== Early life ==
Jackson was born in Invercargill on 24 March 1926 to William Ernest Jackson and Lilian Jane, née Solomon. As a young child her ballet teachers were Stan Lawson and Rosetta Powell in Dunedin. She attended primary schools in Invercargill (Waihopai School), Dunedin (Musselburgh School) and Auckland (Maungawhau School), followed by Epsom Girls' Grammar School. In 1939 there was a benefit concert held at His Majesty's Theatre, Auckland to raise funds for Jackson to continue her study in Paris, however because of World War II Jackson and her mother went to Melbourne and Sydney instead. In 1941 Jackson won the first Royal Academy of Dance scholarship in New Zealand.

== Career ==
In 1946, Jackson joined the Sadler's Wells Ballet in London. She was notable for her role as Swanhilda in the ballet Coppélia, and danced with Robert Helpmann and her husband Philip Chatfield.

By February 1954, she had been promoted to prima ballerina at Sadler's Wells Ballet.

She was renowned for her special gift for fast and brilliant turns. In 1940, before she left New Zealand, she set a world record when she performed 121 fouettés sur place.

Jackson and Chatfield danced together in the Royal Ballet's production of Giselle shortly after they married. The couple retired from the Royal Ballet in 1959 and moved to New Zealand, where she became artistic director of the Royal New Zealand Ballet company. Each of them served as director of the New Zealand Ballet School.

Although Jackson cited the dancing of Fred Astaire and Eleanor Powell as being influences on her, it was a visit from the Russian ballerina Irina Baronova who inspired her to make ballet her 'life's ambition'.

== Personal life ==
On 4 February 1958, Jackson married the British dancer Philip Chatfield. They had a son Paul (born 1960), and a daughter Rosetta (born 1961). In 1991, they were living in Te Atatū. On retirement they moved to the Gold Coast in Queensland in 1993. Chatfield died in Brisbane in July 2021, and Jackson on 15 August 2024, at the age of 98.

== Honours and awards ==
In the 1961 New Year Honours, Jackson was appointed a Member of the Order of the British Empire, for services to ballet, the first dancer to receive this honour.
