= Footnote Dance =

New Zealand dance company, founded 1985

Footnote New Zealand Dance (founded in 1985) is New Zealand's oldest contemporary dance company. Based in Wellington, it has been described as "New Zealand’s most enduring and influential contemporary dance company."

== History ==
Footnote was founded in 1985 by Wellington ballet teacher Deirdre Tarrant with a “dual commitment to fostering original works by local choreographers and composers, and establishing dance workshops in schools”. Tarrant had recently returned from dancing overseas; her vision was to 'establish a real community of creative dance people as well as to develop contemporary dance in New Zealand'. The company has played an important role in establishing and supporting contemporary dance in New Zealand.

Footnote received government funding: in the early 1990s it shifted from project-based funding to receiving recurrent funding through Creative New Zealand.

In 2005 Footnote established its 'Forte' season, where a New Zealand dance artists working internationally was brought back to New Zealand to create a new work for the company.

Dancers and choreographers who have worked with Footnote include Michael Parmenter, Shona McCullagh, Malia Johnston, Raewyn Hill, Lisa Densem and Ross McCormack. The company regularly tours in New Zealand, and has performed in Shanghai, Berlin, Brussels, Antwerp and London.

In 2015 the company marked its 30th anniversary with 30 Forward, a programme of works commissioned over the past ten years from the Forte seasons and a new work by Malia Johnston, Flip Pivot Boom.

== Present–day company ==
In 2012 Tarrant stepped down as director and joined the company's arts advisory panel. Tarrant was succeeded by Malia Johnston. Richard Aindow was general manager from 2014 - 2020 Brian Wood in 2021, and Zoë Nicholson joined in 2023. Anita Hunziker leads the company's artistic vision as Artistic Manager.

The company was headquartered on Wellington's Cuba Street. In 2022, the company moved to a temporary studio in Northland, Wellington, while looking for a permanent premises.

The company is funded through Creative New Zealand, Wellington City Council, Wellington Community Trust, The Lion Foundation, and individual and family donors.
