= Sara Neil (dancer) =

New Zealand ballet dancer

Principal ballerina Sara Neil seated in a dressing room c July 1960
- https://natlib.govt.nz/records/22488383

Sara Neil (born Doreen Brown; 15 April 1932, in Wellington – 9 January 2011) was a New Zealand dancer, and was the first director of the New Zealand School of Dance.

== Early life and education ==
Neil was born in Wellington. Her early dance training was by Phyllis Oliver and Dorothy Daniels. She studied at Wellington Girls' College. In 1949 she left to study dance in England, funded by a Government bursary. She attended the Royal Ballet School and then joined the Sadler's Wells Ballet Company.

== Work ==
Neil was "a technically excellent dancer, with a marked personality in her performances". Choreographer Kenneth MacMillan created a polka solo for her in his 1956 ballet Solitaire, at Sadler's Wells Theatre Ballet

Neil married dancer Walter Trevor in 1956, and in 1958 returned to New Zealand. The couple set up a dance studio in Wellington. In 1960 Neil danced in the New Zealand Ballet Company's first major national tour.

She was on the Ballet Committee set up in 1964 alongside Eric Marris, John Meech, William Whyte, Jeane Horne and Bettina Edwards and they developed policy with the Queen Elizabeth II Arts Council of New Zealand to create a ballet school for New Zealand. Neil became the first director of the National School of Ballet (now known as the New Zealand School of Dance) when it opened in Wellington in 1967. She retired as director of the school later in the year to return to England where she went on to teach at the lower school of the Royal Ballet School, White Lodge. She also directed the Hammond Dance School in Chester.

Neil died in Cumbria, England, on 9 January 2011.
