= Ann Robinson (artist) =

New Zealand studio glass artist

Ann Robinson ONZM
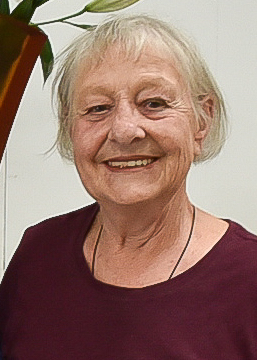
- Born: 1944 (age 81–82); Auckland, New Zealand
- Education: Elam School of Fine Arts
- Known for: Glass art
- Partner: John Edgar
- Relatives: Dove-Myer Robinson (father)

Ann Robinson ONZM (born 1944) is a New Zealand studio glass artist who is internationally known for her glass casting work. Robinson received a Lifetime Achievement Award from the American Glass Art Society in 2006, and was named an Arts Foundation of New Zealand living icon in 2026.

== Training and early career ==
Robinson first attended the Elam School of Fine Arts in the late 1960s majoring in sculpture – with bronze casting her specialisation, using the lost-wax casting (otherwise known as cire perdue) process. Robinson left before graduating but returned after a 15-year break. When she returned in the late 1970s she studied glass blowing which was then available. During this time she also began experimenting in lost-wax casting with glass.

After graduating from Elam in 1980, Robinson joined glass artists John Croucher and Garry Nash (ONZM) at Sunbeam Glass Works in Auckland. During her nine years with the studio glass blowing Robinson continued experimenting with wax glass casting. In 1989 Robinson left Sunbeam Glass Works and has since worked exclusively in the medium of caste glass.

== Cast glass work ==
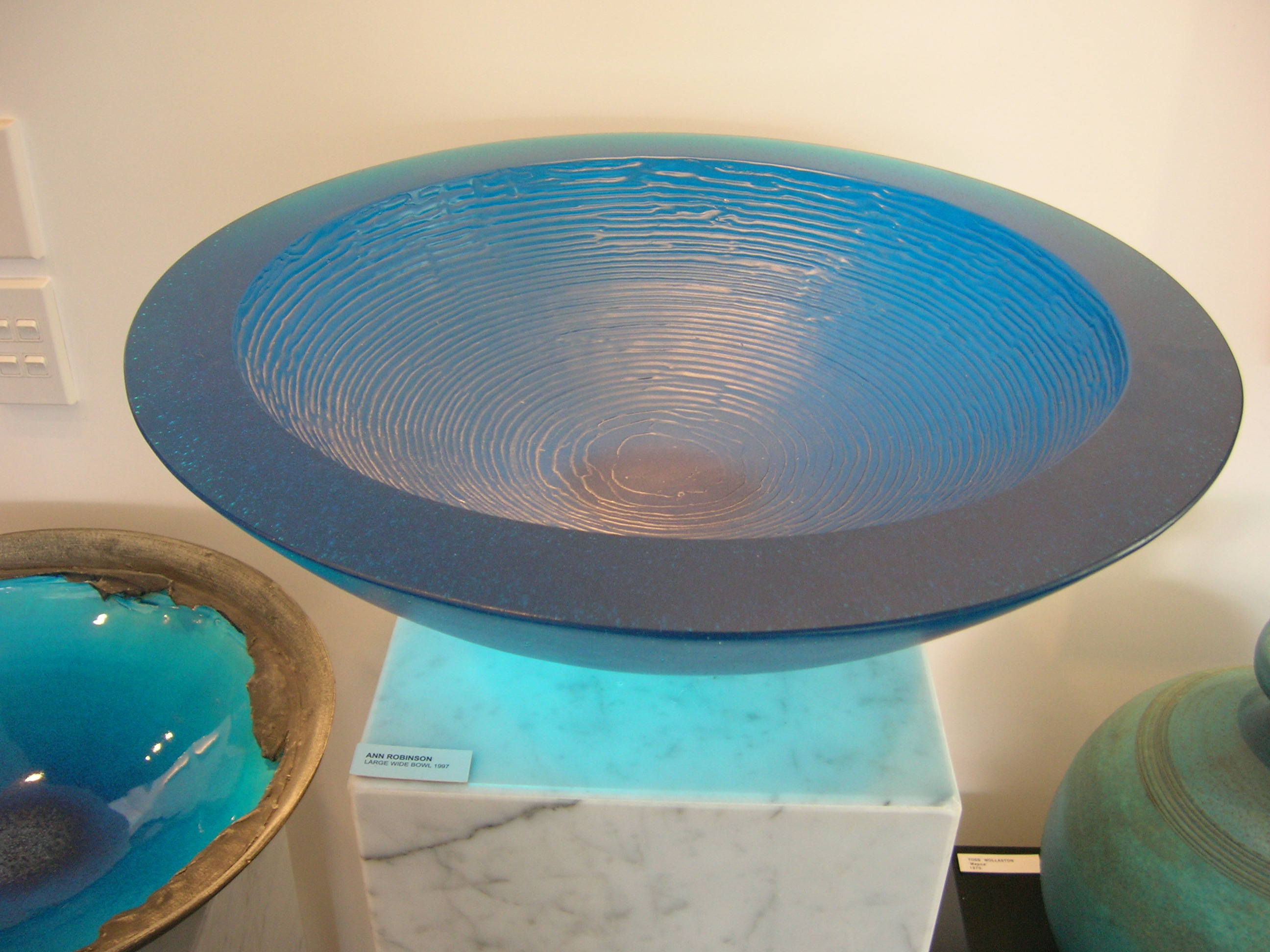
Large Wide Bowl (1997), a piece by Robinson purchased by architect Ron Sang

Robinson is one of the pioneers of the art of lost-wax casting for glass. She undertook extensive research and experimentation in the 1970s to perfect the art. Early on, when developing this process, Robinson had a year where every piece she made broke. As Beazley states "[i]t is ... something of a triumph that she has learnt to control cooling processes, which in her larger pieces can take as long as three weeks." The Director of Milford Galleries in Dunedin, Stephen Higginson, further emphasizes the time and space required for Robinson to create her works: some pieces can in fact take up to two months to cool and need to be alone in the kiln during this cooling process.

The lost-wax casting technique Robinson developed is a modified version of the bronze casting technique. It involves creating a plaster mould which is filled with molten wax. The mould is then removed (and can be reused) and the wax is encased in a heat-resistant covering and placed in the kiln. When the wax is burnt out, this cavity is then filled with molten glass.

In 1989, Robinson moved to one of Auckland's west coast beaches, Karekare. This move is often noted in reference to her art because of the influence of nature in her work, with the native plants there, particularly nīkau and harakeke, featuring in her designs. As Powerhouse Museum states, "the spectacular environment of the Pacific region began to influence her designs." Robinson herself has said "I like the idea that my pieces encapsulate the music of the forest."

In 1992, Ann Robinson was one of 14 New Zealand ceramic and glass artists asked to contribute pieces for display in Treasures of the Underworld at the Seville Expo; Robinson was the only glass artist invited to contribute. Artists were requested to make something larger than they ever had before and given a phrase to drive their work: Robinson's was ‘Southern Hemisphere’. The vessels she created were 40–45 kg each and were evocative of the pacific. Robinson has more recently significantly increased the size of her pieces, experimenting with a piece that is 80 kg.

Robinson has a particular affinity and appreciation for vessels. For many years these were the sole focus of her craft. She subsequently explored other forms with a series of oversized native pods. Robinson's latest exhibitions, Brim and Capital, display a further development in her work with a more geometric refinement. Robinson attributes the changes in her art to her recent move from Karekare to a suburb of Auckland.

== Critical reception and recognition ==
Robinson's work features in the permanent collections of art galleries around the world, including the Victoria and Albert Museum in the United Kingdom, the Museum of New Zealand Te Papa Tongarewa, Corning Museum of Glass in the United States, the National Gallery of Victoria, Australia and Stadtmuseum, Germany. She has also regularly exhibited in both solo and group exhibitions in New Zealand and internationally.

Robinson is sought after as a teacher and lecturer, including at the Pilchuck Glass School, Washington State, United States, at the Studio, Corning Museum of Glass in New York State, the United States, the Victoria and Albert Museum conference: Transparency in Glass, London, United Kingdom, the Canberra School of Art, Australia and at the North Lands Creative Glass 2003 Conference in Scotland.

Dan Klein comments, in his book Artists in Glass: Late Twentieth Century Master in Glass: “the power of Ann Robinson's work comes from its bold simplicity, its vivid colouring and its controlled forms”, he further states: “the vessels change as the light changes, giving them a sort of inner life that adds to their magic.”

Dan Chappell, in 'Defining Light and Space', Art News, similarly stated, "the more you see of Robinson's work, with its soft, almost fecund, curved vessels and rhythmic patterns of nature, the more you realise hers is more a liberation of light – a release of the inner warmth and pulse from the very core of her creations."

Peter Simpson, in Craft Arts International, said, "Who knows what more is yet to come from an artist so resourceful, so gifted and with a divaricating habit?"

== Wider influence ==
In addition to her own art, Robinson is notable for the contribution she has made to the cast glass technique internationally and the development of caste glass artistry in New Zealand. Robinson is one of a small number of people in the world responsible for the development of the lost wax casting technique for glass. As D Wood, in Neus Glas states of Robinson, "she is an internationally respected doyenne of the genre."

Caste class has featured prominently in the glass art scene in New Zealand since Robinson's ground breaking work and newer glass artists, such as Layla Walters, Mike Crawford and Emily Siddell have been under Robinson's tutelage.

== Solo exhibitions ==
- 2013 Capital, Page Blackie Gallery, Wellington, NZBrim, FHE Galleries, Auckland, New Zealand
- 2012 The Thick and Thin of it, Milford Galleries, Queenstown
- 2010 Masterworks, Milford Galleries, Queenstown; Abundance, FHE Galleries, Auckland
- 2009 Celebrating the Recession, Milford Galleries, Queenstown
- 2008 Divaricate, FHE Galleries, Auckland; A Trans-Tasman Sampler, Axia Modern Art, Melbourne, Australia
- 2006 Ann Robinson, the Duane Reed Gallery, St Louis, Missouri, USA
- 2005 A Sombre Take, FHE Galleries, Auckland
- 2002-3 Pacific Rim: Ann Robinson's Glass, Museum of New Zealand, Te Papa Tangarewa, Wellington
- 2001 Ann Robinson: Light from New Zealand, Galerie Jean Claude Chapelotte, Luxembourg
- 2000 Old Zeal: New Zeal, Axia Modern Art, Melbourne, Australia
- 1999 Adrift, Elliott Brown Gallery, Seattle, Washington, USA
- 1998 Ann Robinson, Casting Light: A Survey of Glass Castings 1981–1997, Dowse Art Museum Wellington & New Gallery, Auckland
- 1997 Tall Poppies, Lopdell House Gallery, Waitakere City; A Point in Time, Masterworks Gallery, Auckland, NZ
- 1995 Ann Robinson: A Survey, Elliott Brown Gallery, Seattle, Washington, USA
- 1994 Ann Robinson at Masterworks, Masterworks Gallery, Auckland; Ann Robinson, Galerie L, Hamburg, Germany; From Fantasy to Function V. Kurts Bingham Gallery, Memphis, Tennessee, USA
- 1993 Ann Robinson, Grand opening at Elliot Brown Gallery, Seattle, Washington, USA
- 1992 Masterworks Gallery, Parnell, Auckland
- 1984 Artisan Centre, Auckland

== Selected group exhibitions ==
- 2012 Chasen, Milford Galleries, Queenstown
- 2009 Luminaries, Sabia Gallery, Sydney
- 2003-4 Southern Exposure, NZ Society of Artists in Glass travelling exhibition to Ebell of Denmark
- 2001 Transparent Things, National Gallery of Australia, Canberra, Australia
- 2000 Creativity and Collaboration, Pilchuck Glass School's 30 Years; Bumbershoot 2000 Seattle Center, Seattle, Washington, USA
- 1999 New Zealand Glass, Axia Modern Art, Melbourne, Australia
- 1997 Inaugural Exhibition, John Elder Gallery, New York City; Art in Glass ’97, Editions Gallery, Melbourne, Australia; Ledbetter Lusk Gallery, Memphis, Tennessee, USA; Elliot Brown Gallery, Seattle, WA Frantisek Vizner and Daniel Clayman
- 1996 Introductions VII, Lisa Kurts Gallery, Memphis, Tennessee, USA
- 1995 The Vessel Aesthetic, Kavesh Gallery, Ketchum, Idaho, USA; A Powerful Presence: Pilchuck Glass School's 25 years, Bumvershoot, Rainier Room at the Seattle Center, Seattle, Washington, USA
- 1994 Breaking the Mold: New Kilnformed Glass, Heller Gallery, Palm Beach, Florida, USA; Glass from the Pacific Rim, Art Department Gallery, San Francisco State University, San Francisco, California, USA
- 1993 Parriott, Perkins and Robinson, Chicago International New Art Forms Exposition at Navy Pier, Chicago, Illinois, USA; Annual Pilchuck Exhibition, William Traver Gallery, Seattle, Washington, USA; Pilchuck Glass Exhibition, SeaTac Airport, Seattle, Washington, USA
- 1992 International Directions in Glass, Art Gallery of Western Australia, Perth, Australia; Treasures of the Underworld, Serville, Spain
- 1990 New Zealand Crafts Council, Wellington
- 1988 World Glass Now ’88 Hokkaido Museum of Modern Art, Hakkaido, Japan; Stones in Glass Houses, Villas Gallery, Wellington
- 1986 Sunbeam Glassworks, Dowse Art Museum, Lower Hutt, Wellington

== Honours and awards ==
- 2026 – Arts Foundation of New Zealand Te Tumu Toi Icon Award
- 2006 – American Glass Society Lifetime Achievement Award for Services to Glass
- 2006 – Arts Foundation of New Zealand Laureate
- 2006 – Waitakere City Arts Laureate Award
- 2002 – John Britten Award for contribution to design
- 2001 – Appointed Officer of the New Zealand Order of Merit, for services to glass art, in the 2001 Queen's Birthday Honours
- 1987 – Winstone Biennale Award
- 1986 – Phillips Glass Award
- 1984 – Phillips Glass Award
- 1981 – AHI prize in glass design
