= Guy Ngan =

New Zealand artist (1926–2017)

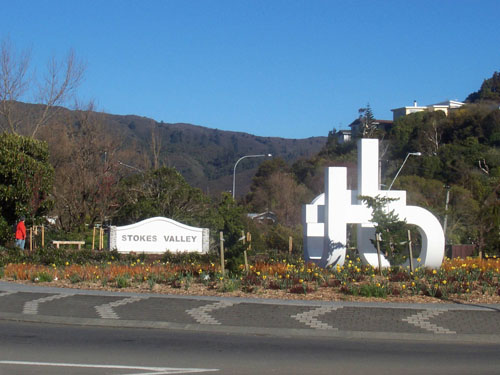
Mating Worms, a sculpture by Guy Ngan that stands on the roundabout at the entrance to Stokes Valley

Guy Ngan OBE (Chinese: 顏國鍇; 3 February 1926 – 26 June 2017) was a New Zealand artist. He worked across a large range of media, including sculpture, painting, drawing, design and architecture, and is known for his incorporation of Māori motifs such as the tiki. Many of his works are in prominent places, such as the tapestry in the Beehive and sculpture at the Reserve Bank, while many others are dotted around the country in smaller towns and suburban locations such as Stokes Valley.

== Biography ==
Ngan was born in 1926 in Wellington to Chinese parents Wai Yin and Chin Ting, but he called himself “Pacific Chinese”.

During his young years, he was educated in China. In 1938 a Japanese bomb dropped next door while they were having breakfast. Ngan's father took Guy and his brother to Hong Kong and put them on a boat to New Zealand and they never saw him again. Guy Ngan attended Newtown School but he was unhappy and then stayed with relatives in Miramar.

At 17, he began night school at Wellington Technical College with sculptor Alex Fraser. Under the advice of Fraser, Ngan travelled to London in 1951 to continue his education Goldsmith's School of Art at the University of London. In the same year he was allowed entry to the Royal College of Art, in London. In 1954, he graduated and was given the Royal College Continuation Scholarship for one year. He was paid £600. In 1955 the British Council awarded him with a scholarship and an allowance of £12 a week and all travel expenses paid for.

In 1956 he returned to New Zealand. He worked as a consultant at the architecture division for the Ministry of Works. He worked here until 1960 and then went to work for Stephenson and Turner Architects until 1970. Ngan then became the director of New Zealand Academy of Fine Arts for 20 years. During this time he encouraged New Zealand artists to promote their art talents at museums. He also encouraged Māori and cultural art.

Ngan married Jean Wong, and they had two children. Ngan and his family lived in Stokes Valley, in the house that he designed and built himself.

In the 1983 Queen's Birthday Honours, Ngan was appointed an Officer of the Order of the British Empire, for services to the arts. He died in Lower Hutt on 26 June 2017.

In October 2019 Cordy’s in Auckland held an auction of Guy Ngan's collection and estate.

== Works ==
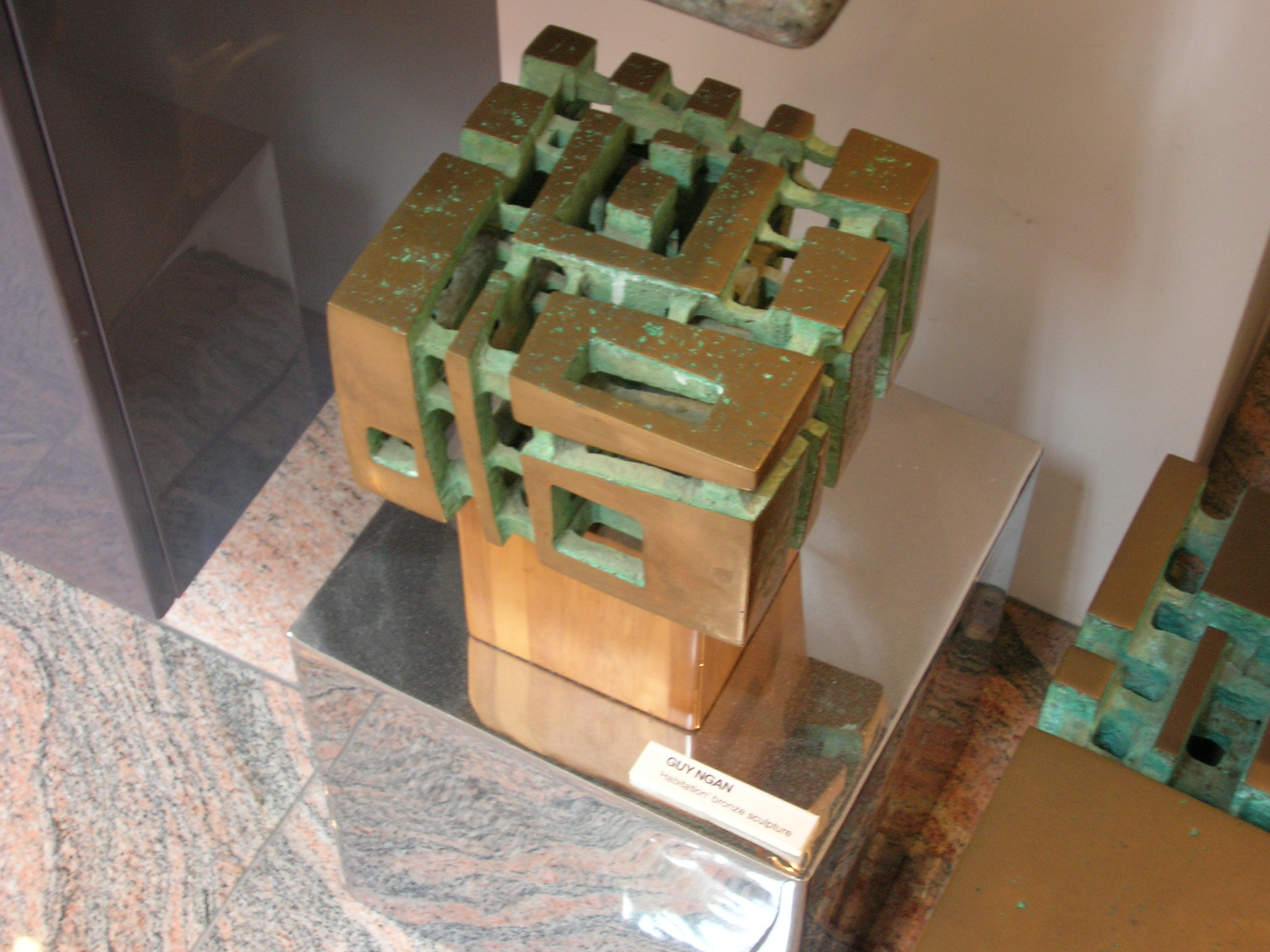
Habitation Bronze Sculpture, a Ngan piece owned by architect Ron Sang

Ngan worked as a painter, artist, architect and designer. Many of his work are displayed in important and historical buildings across New Zealand. He lived in Stokes Valley for 50 years and created the sculpture that resides at the entrance to Stokes Valley 'Mating Worms', installed in 1976. More recently, as part of E Tu Awakairangi Public Art Trust, 'Elevating Worms' was installed at the Scott's Court Shopping Centre, also in Stokes Valley.

Ngan was commissioned to create a mural for the opening of the Naenae Post Office in 1959, the first time a Post Office was decorated with a mural and thought to be the only time Ngan used linoleum in his work. The mural was destroyed during refurbishment in the 1980s, but after new building works in 2024 uncovered outlines of the pieces of linoleum, the work was recreated in situ in acoustic tiles as part of renovation of the building to become the Naenae Community Centre.

Other public works include an untitled bronze sculpture installed outside the Reserve Bank Building, The Terrace, Wellington; relief work adorning the New Zealand Archives Building, Thorndon Quay, Wellington.

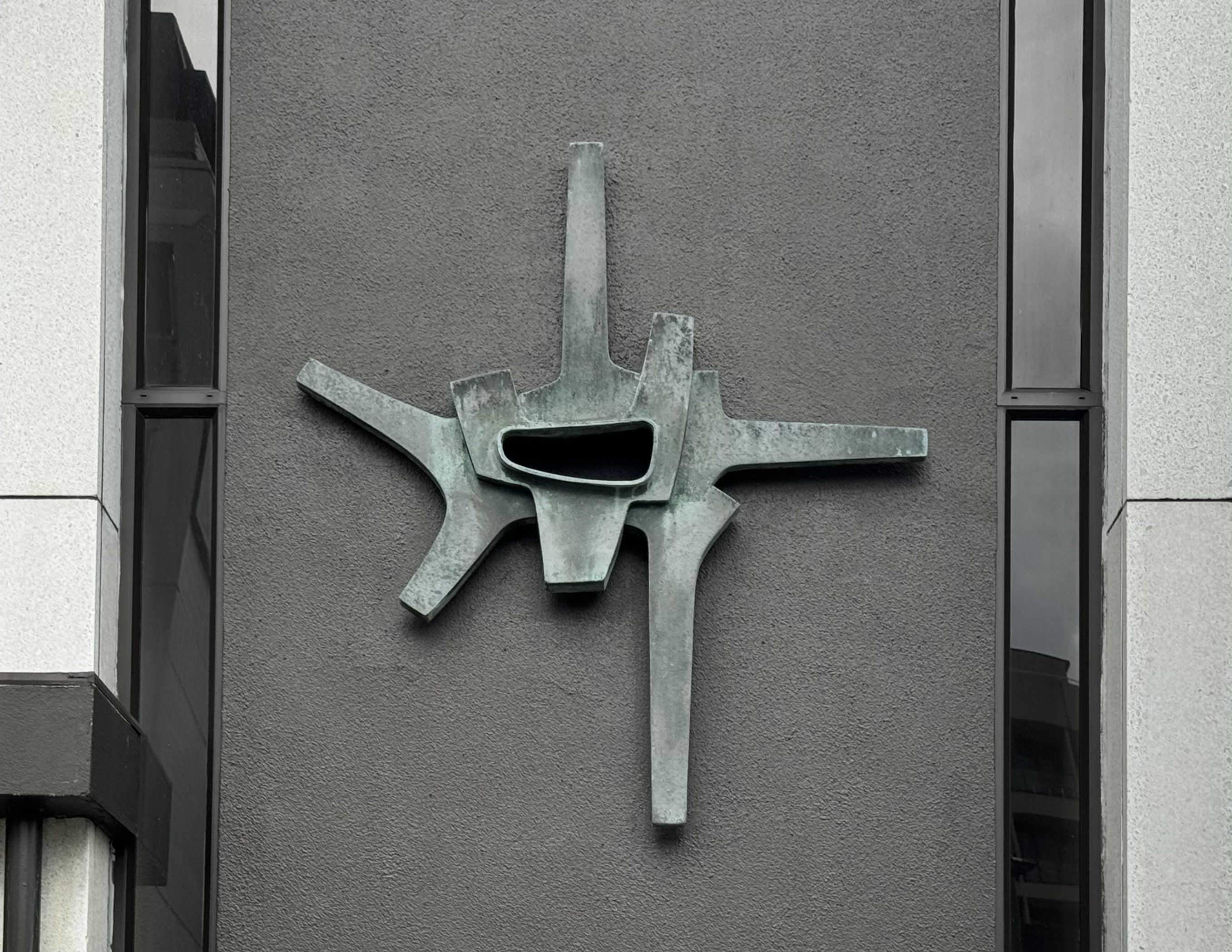
Guy Ngan 'Star' (1973) corner of Karangahape Road and East Street, Auckland

Ngan was also responsible for designing a tapestry for the Beehive, Parliamentary Buildings in Wellington 'Forest in the Sun' (1976). The piece was commissioned for the Beehive's central stairway. Joan Calvert along with Dorothea Turner and Ngan's wife Jean took 18 months to construct the tapestry. It hung in the Beehive from 1977 until 2003, when it was gifted to Te Papa. The work was returned to the parliamentary collection in 2023, and was reinstalled in the original location.

One of Wellington's earliest modern public sculptures, 'Geometric Growth' is installed near the Michael Fowler Centre. Initially sited on the corner of Victoria and Mercer streets, it was removed for the Civic Square precinct in 1989. It was damaged upon removal, then restored and reinstated to its new site in 2006.

Ngan's collaborations with architect Ron Sang have led to some important large scale works including the Newton Post Office mural, now in the Auckland Art Gallery collection.

== Exhibitions ==
Ngan, although a prolific artist, did not exhibit frequently in New Zealand. However, towards the end of his life and posthumously several significant exhibitions explored his career and legacy.

The first major exhibition of Ngan's work was held at City Gallery Wellington in 2006; it was his first exhibition in a public gallery since 1979. When approached about mounting the exhibition Ngan declared he was "too young for a retrospective" and asked instead to "develop a project on his long-held fascination in the history of early Pacific settlement". Titled Guy Ngan: Journey: Aluminium Panel, Tiki Hands, and Anchor Stones the exhibition was curated by Heather Galbraith and was born from exploring the connections between Asian southern migration, birds and connections to Pacific cultures.

In 2019 a retrospective of Ngan's worked titled Guy Ngan:Habitation was mounted at The Dowse Art Museum. The exhibition brought together paintings, prints and sculptures, including a special focus on the ""Habitation"" sculptures, in which Ngan carved forms from polystyrene which were then cast in aluminium or bronze. The exhibition also included the tapestry work Forest in the Sun.
