= Graham Bennett (sculptor) =

New Zealand sculptor (born 1947)

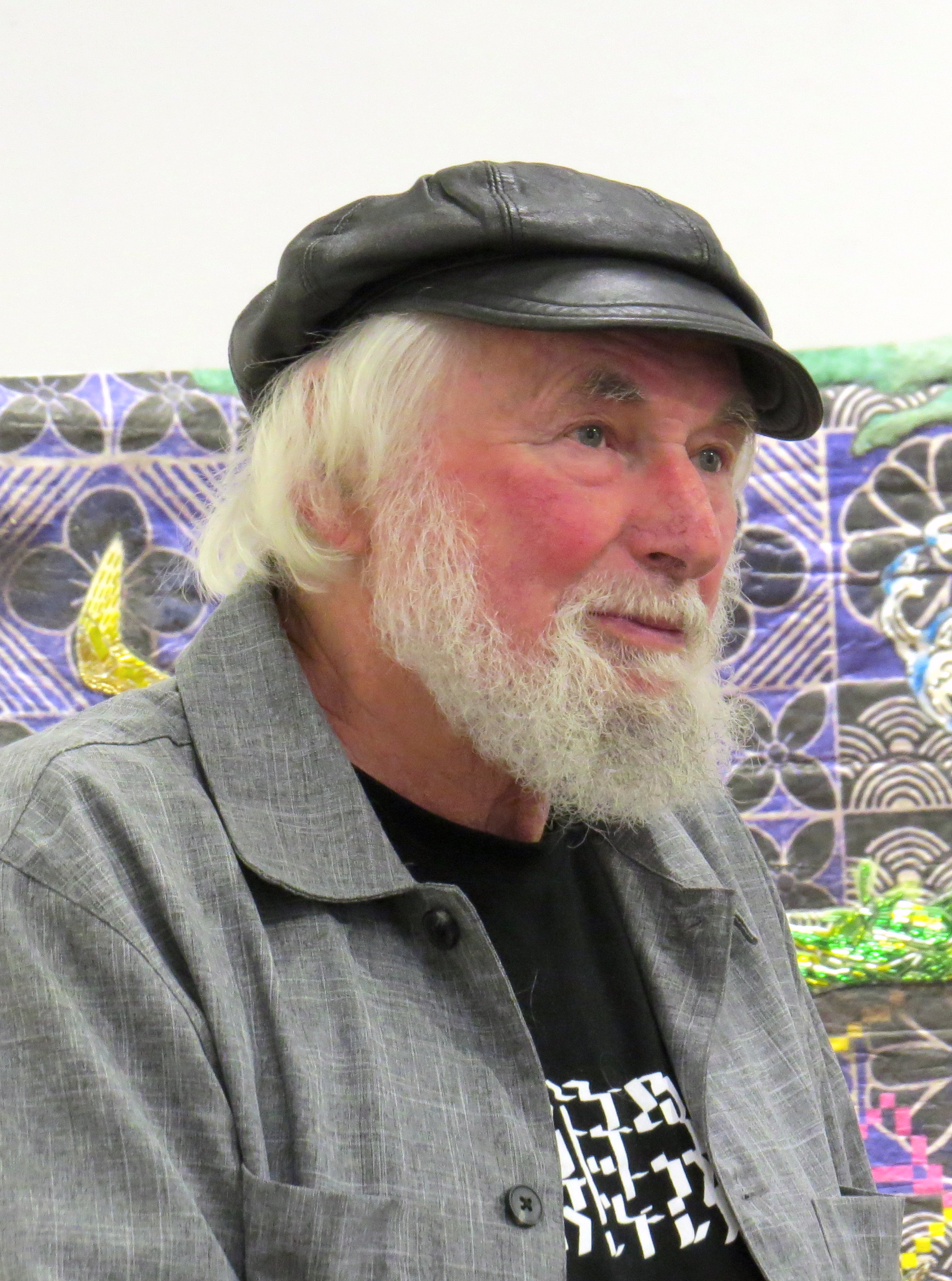
- Graham Bennett at Milford Gallery, Dunedin, March 2026
- Born: 1947 (age 78–79); Nelson, New Zealand
- Education: University of Canterbury School of Fine Arts
- Known for: Sculpture

Graham Bennett (born 1947) is a New Zealand sculptor.

== Early life and education ==
Bennett was born in 1947 in Nelson, New Zealand. He graduated from the Ilam School of Fine Arts in 1970 where he trained in photography. Interested in the human body and three-dimensional form, he became a sculptor, often combining natural materials (wood, stone) with stainless steel and bronze. He refined his practice as a sculptor while lecturing at CPIT (now Ara Institute of Canterbury) in the School of Art and Design. Bennett lives in Christchurch as a full-time artist.

== Work ==
Bennett installed Sea/Sky Kaipara at Gibbs Farm in 1994. He is represented with four sculptures in the Brick Bay Sculpture Trail outdoor gallery at Snells Beach, north of Auckland. For the World Firefighters Games held in Christchurch in October/November 2002, Bennett sculpted A Tribute to Firefighters from steel girders from the World Trade Center destroyed in the September 11 attacks donated by the mayor of New York City, Michael Bloomberg. The sculpture is placed on the banks for the Avon River immediately adjacent to the Central Fire Station in the central city in the Firefighters Reserve that was built for the games. A few months later, Reasons for Voyaging was installed in front of the Christchurch Art Gallery in 2003, consisting of seven angled stainless steel poles that are up to 13 metres (43 ft) tall.

Bennett was one of five artists in residency at the 2012 Seoul International Sculpture Festa, with his commissioned worked, Tipping Point, permanently installed by Crown Confectionery in the Art Valley sculpture park in Haitai, South Korea. In 2013, he had residency at Lincoln University. During this time, he produced Oversight, a sculpture installed in front of the School of Landscape Architecture.

== Gallery ==
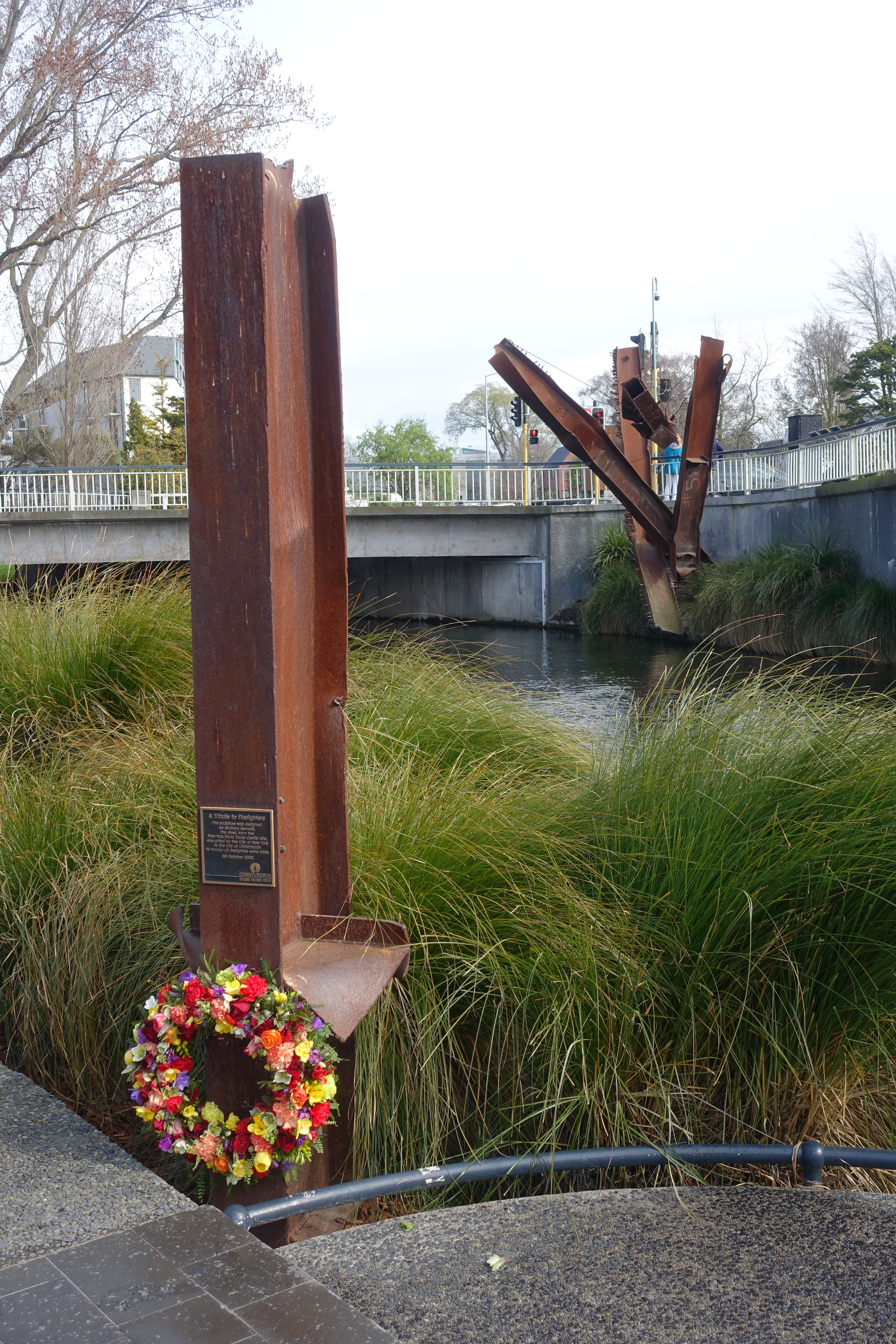
A Tribute to Firefighters (2002), Christchurch

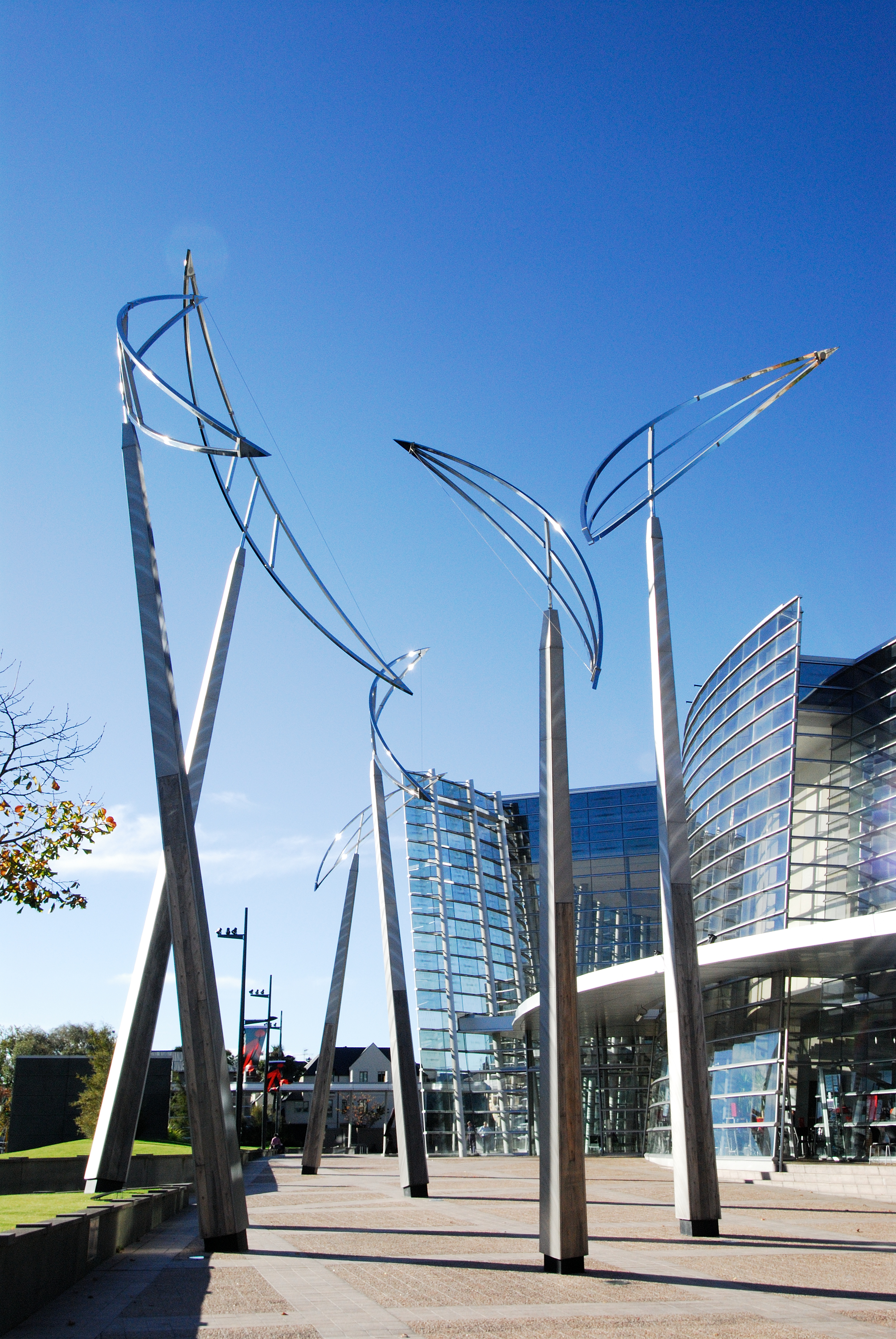
Reasons for Voyaging (2003), Christchurch Art Gallery

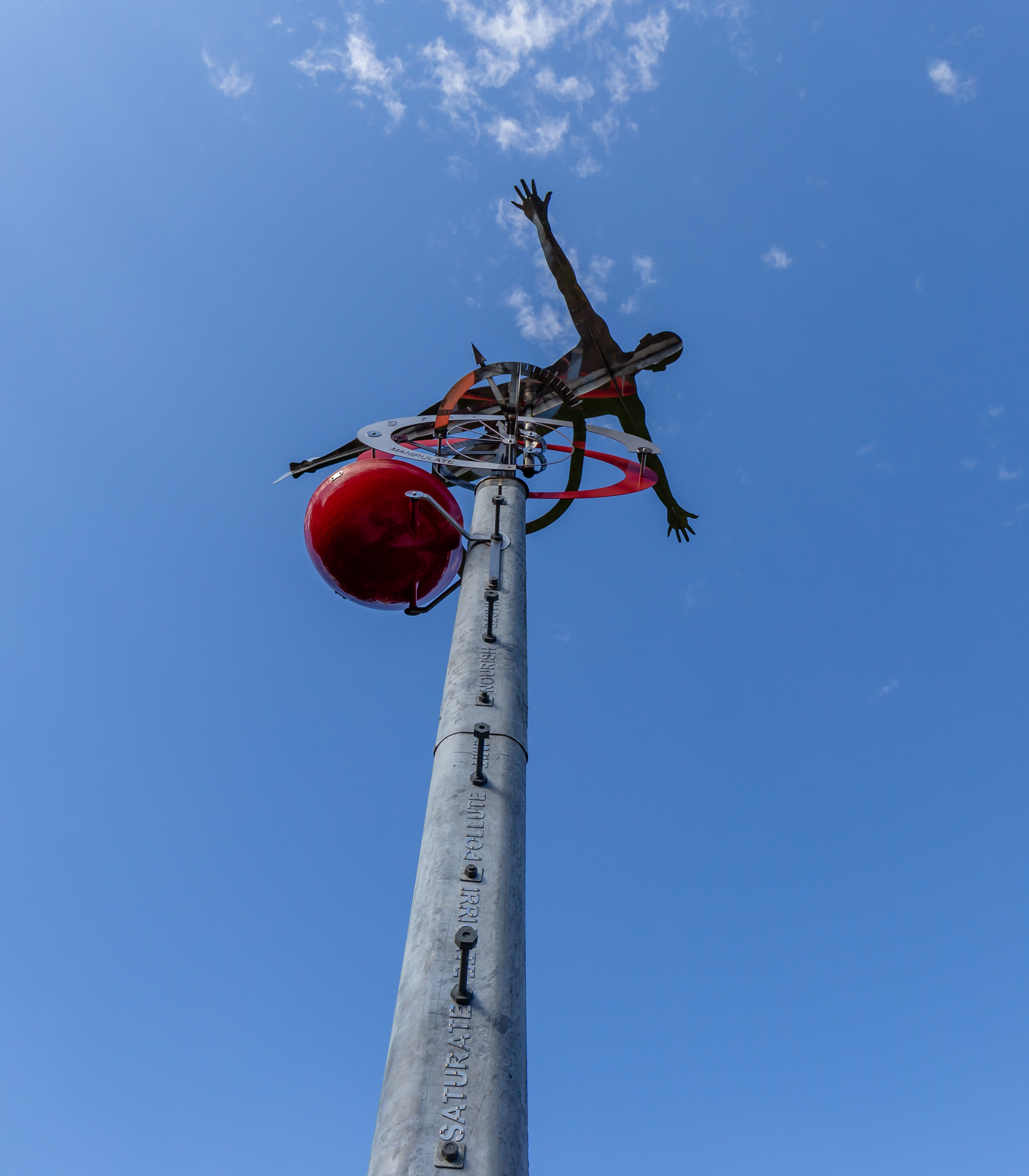
Oversight (2013), Lincoln University

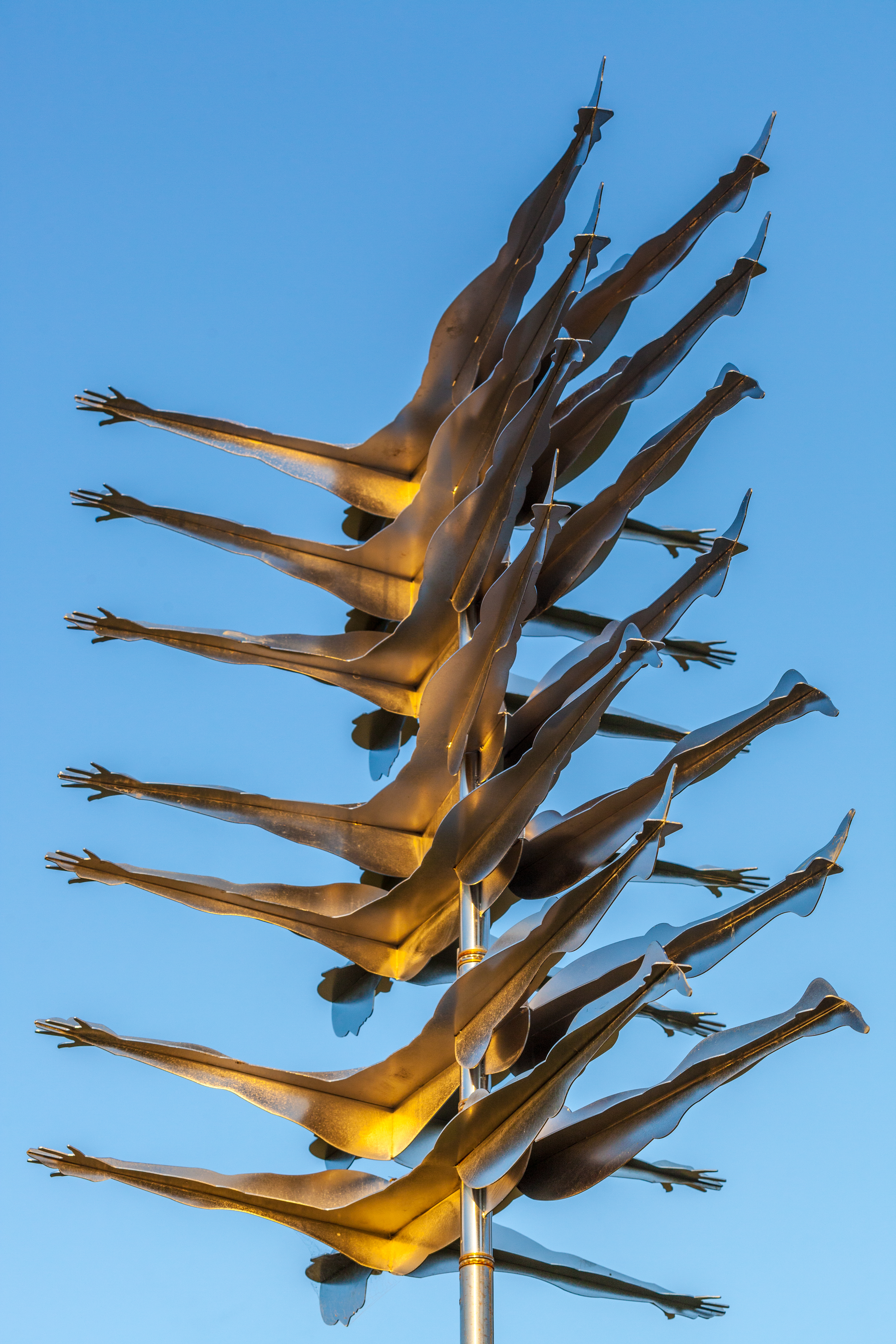
Push Away the Sky (2015), Auckland Botanic Gardens

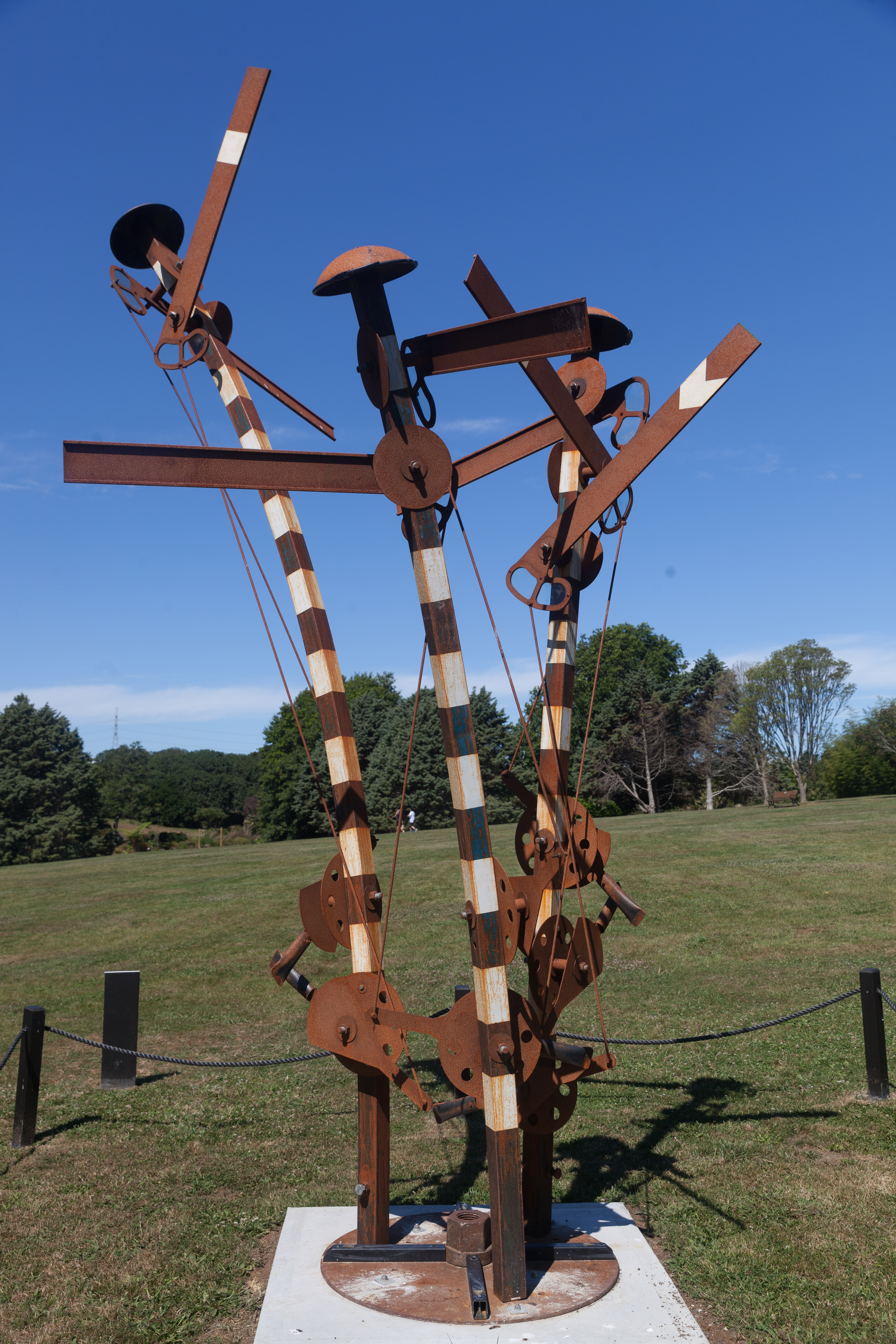
On Becoming Misdirected (2017), Auckland Botanic Gardens
