= John Edgar (sculptor) =

New Zealand sculptor and medallist (1950–2021)

John Edgar ONZM
- Born: John Stanley Edgar; 26 December 1950; Auckland, New Zealand
- Died: 3 April 2021 (aged 70); Auckland, New Zealand
- Education: Mount Albert Grammar School; University of New South Wales
- Occupations: Sculptor; Medallist
- Partner: Ann Robinson
- Website: www.johnedgar.co.nz

John Stanley Edgar ONZM (26 December 1950 – 3 April 2021) was a New Zealand sculptor and medallist.

== Early life and education ==
Born in Auckland on 26 December 1950, Edgar was educated at Mount Albert Grammar School and then the University of New South Wales. He then worked as a research chemist and as a prospector before turning to sculpture.

== Sculptural work ==
As a sculptor, Edgar worked chiefly in hard stone, and occasionally in other materials, such as glass or copper.

In 2000, he designed McLeod's Crossing, a pedestrian bridge over the Oratia Stream in Falls Park, Henderson, commissioned by Waitakere City Council. Since 2004, a public commission, Transformer, has been part of the sculpture walk in the Auckland Domain. Another work, Lie of the Land, was installed in the Savill Garden, in Windsor Great Park in England, in 2012. His works are also in a number of public collections, including Auckland Council, Christchurch Art Gallery, Corning Museum of Glass (USA), the Museum of New Zealand Te Papa Tongarewa and the National Museum of Australia.

Edgar designed the Icon award medal for the Arts Foundation of New Zealand, and the medal awarded to Companions of Auckland War Memorial Museum. The latter is made from "two New Zealand argillites (pakohe) from the South Island bound together with aluminium". He also illustrated books of poetry by Dinah Hawken.

== Honours and awards ==
Edgar was appointed an Officer of the New Zealand Order of Merit in the 2009 New Year Honours, for services to art, in particular sculpture.

== Other activities ==
Edgar lived in Karekare, and served as president of the Waitakere Ranges Protection Society since 1998. He was made a life member of the society in 2005.

== Death ==
Edgar died in Auckland on 3 April 2021.

== Gallery ==
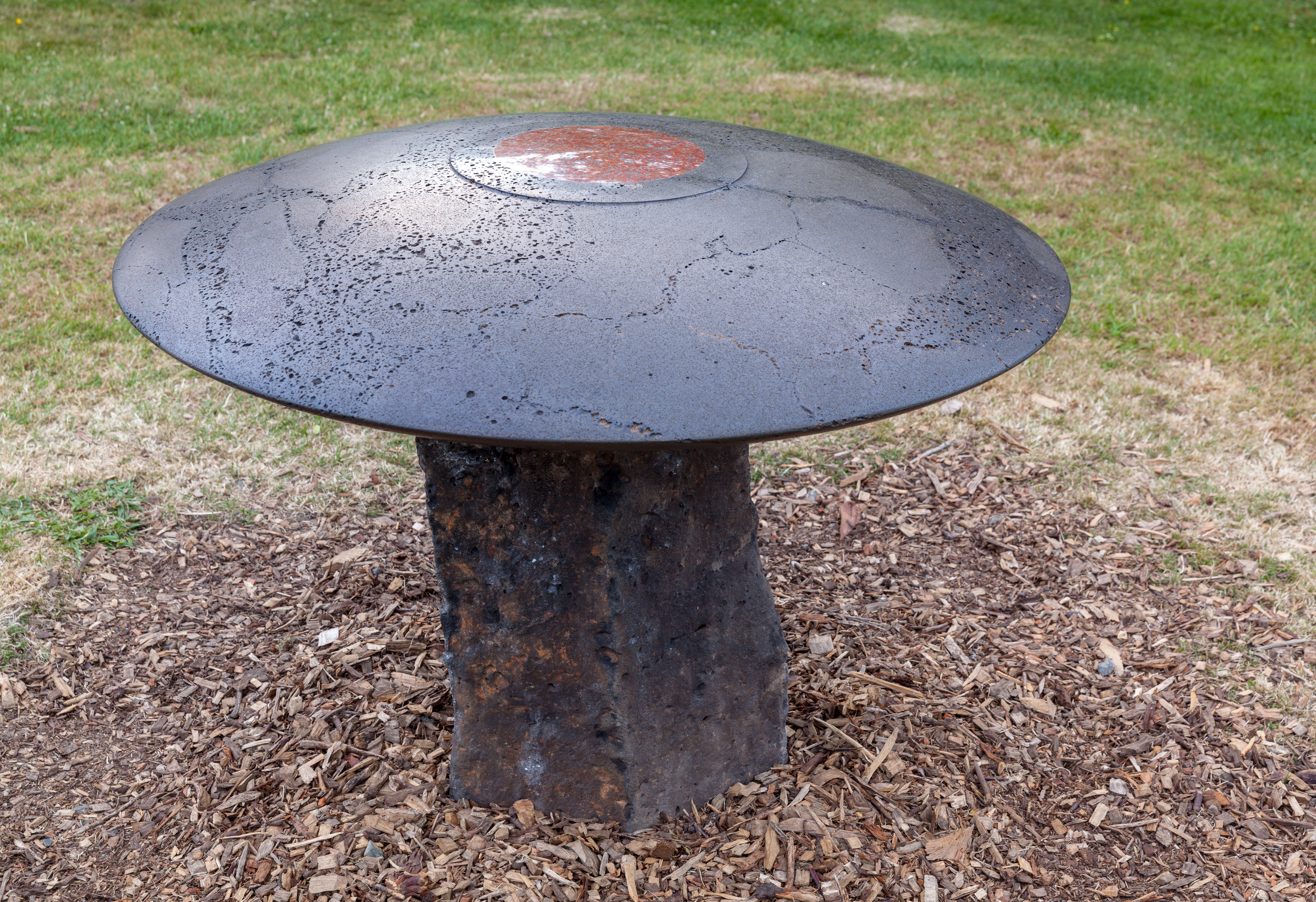
Lens, in the Auckland Botanic Gardens

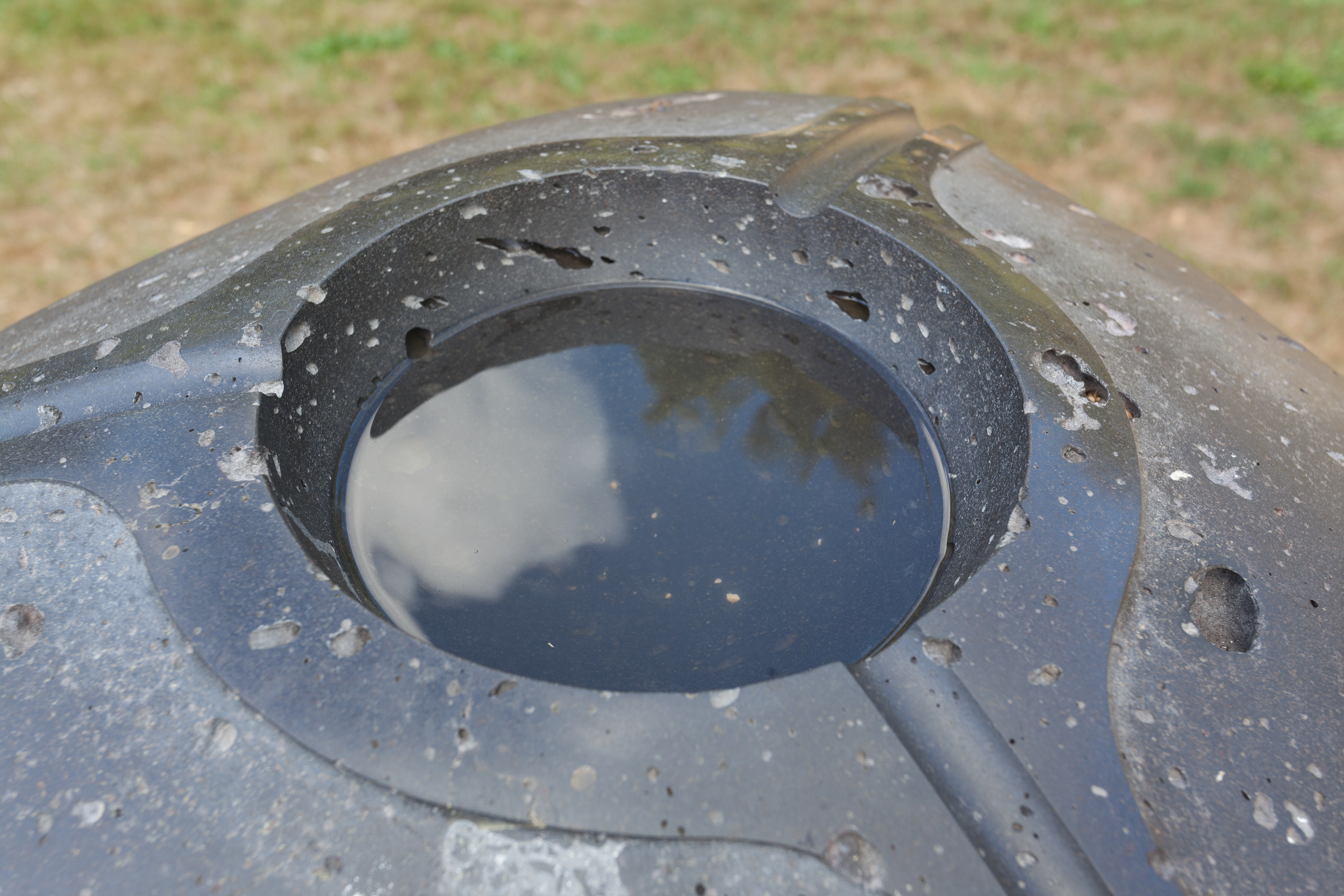
Font, in the Auckland Botanic Gardens

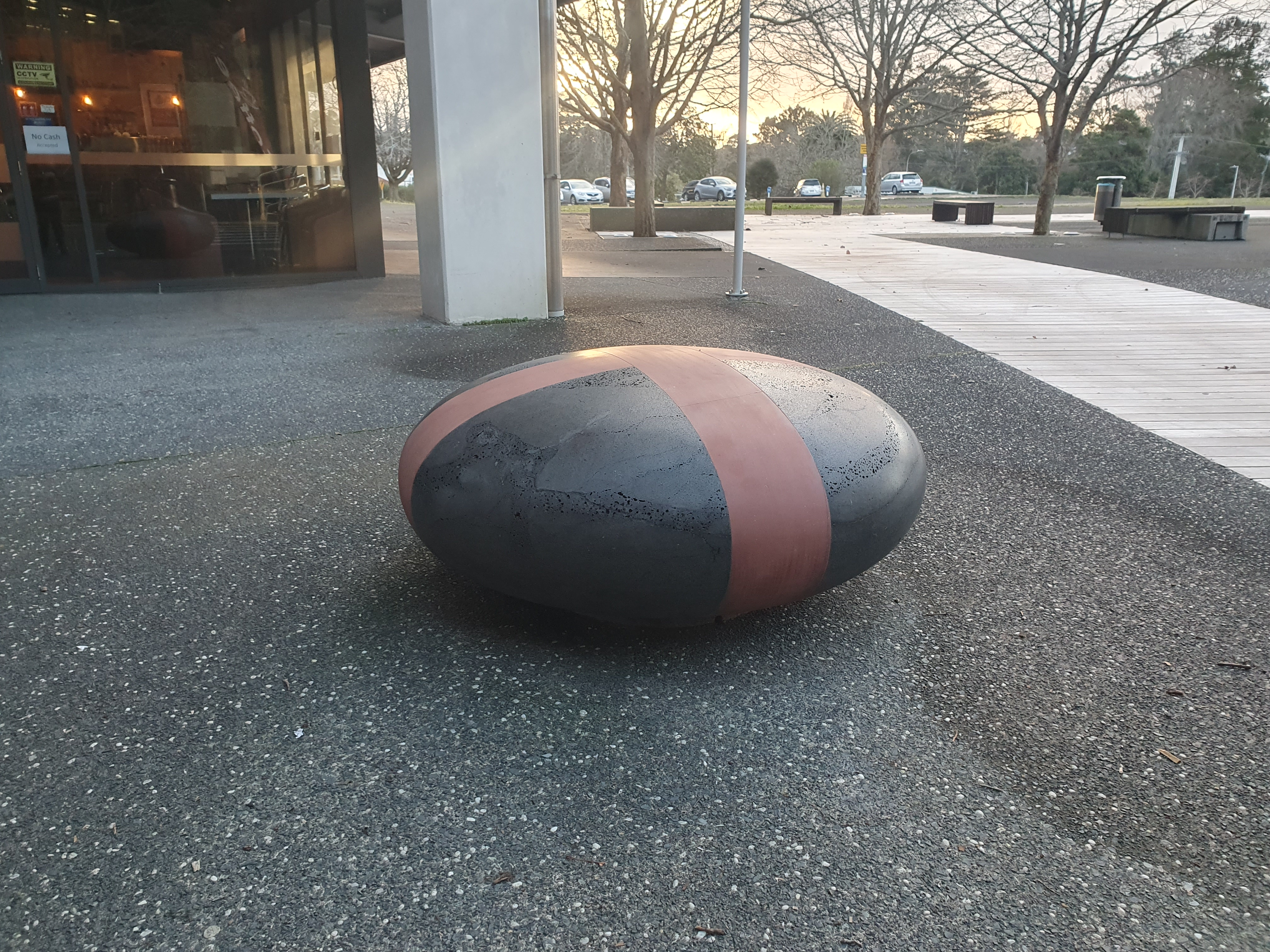
Red Cross, in Henderson

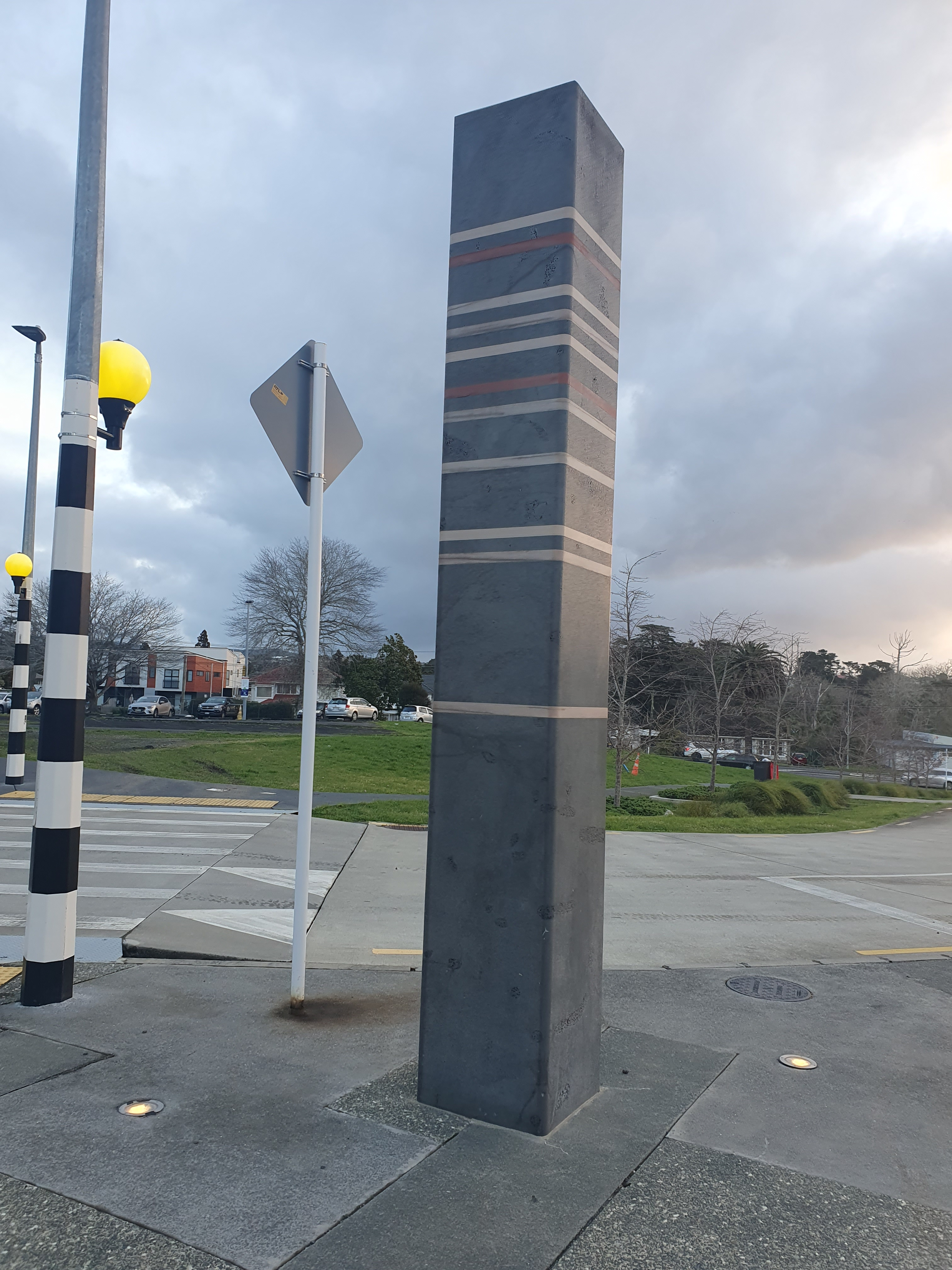
Transformer, in Henderson

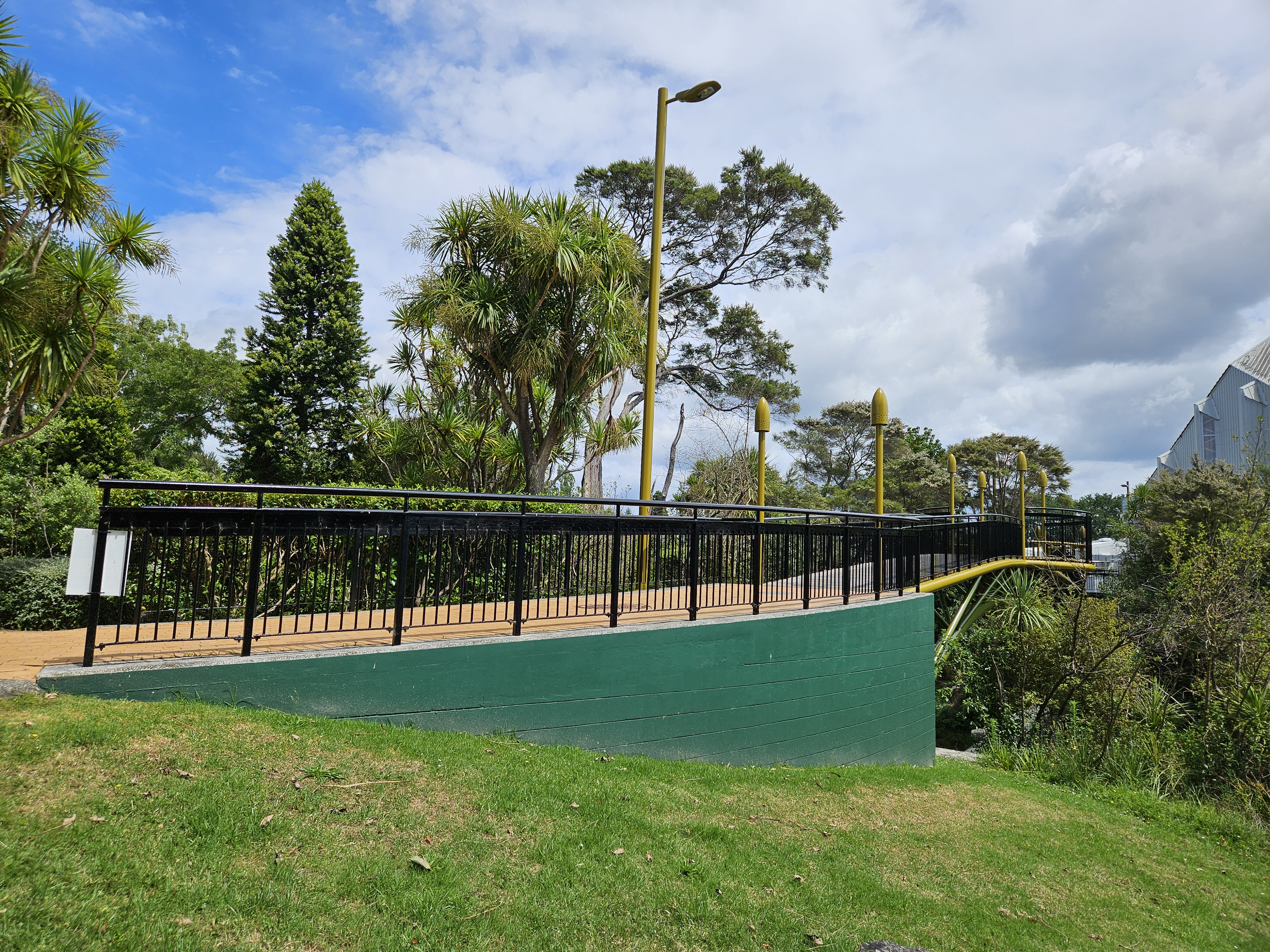
McLeod's Crossing, a footbridge designed by Edgar in Henderson

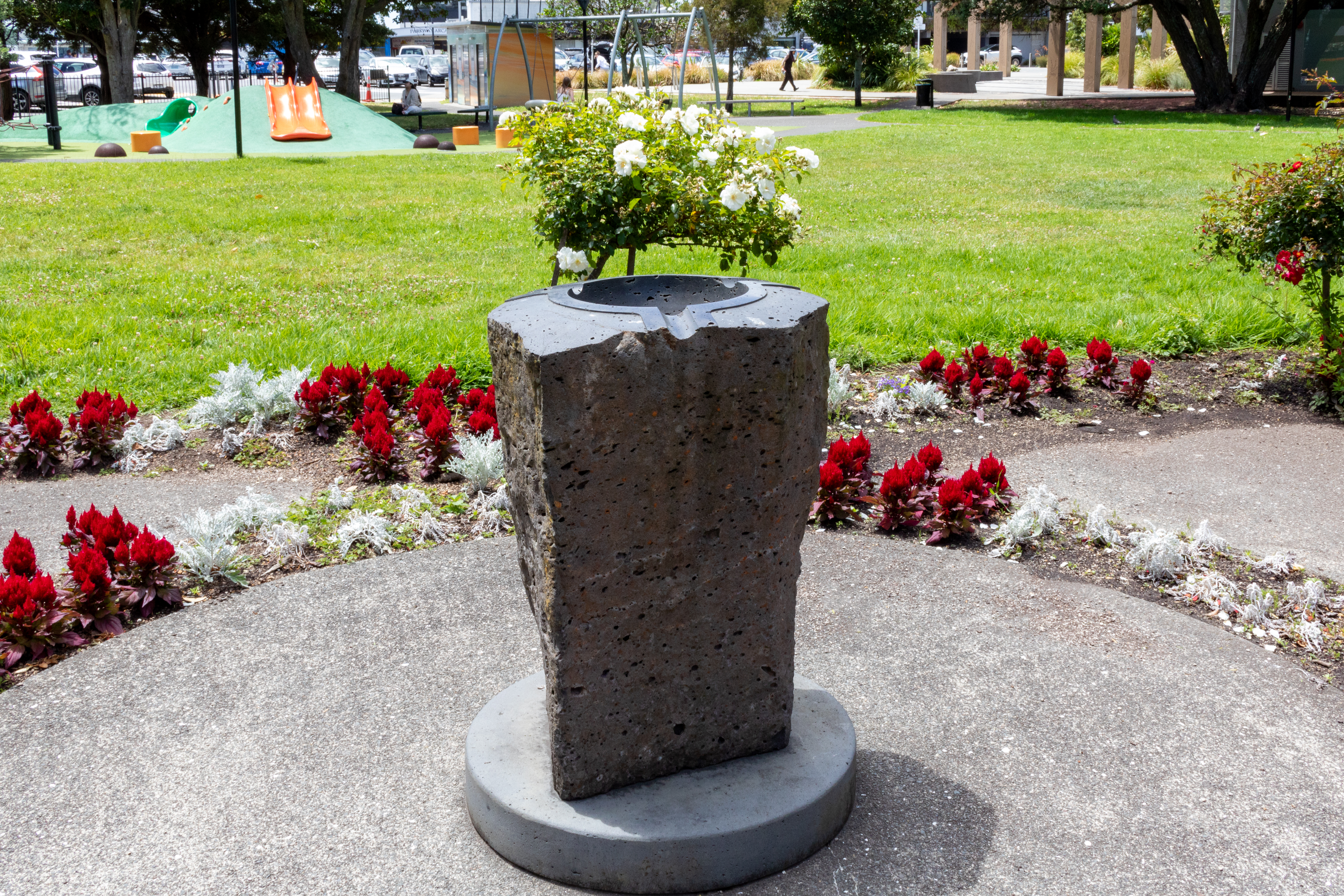
Birdbath, Takapuna Rose Gardens
