= Firefighters Reserve =

9/11 memorial in Christchurch, New Zealand

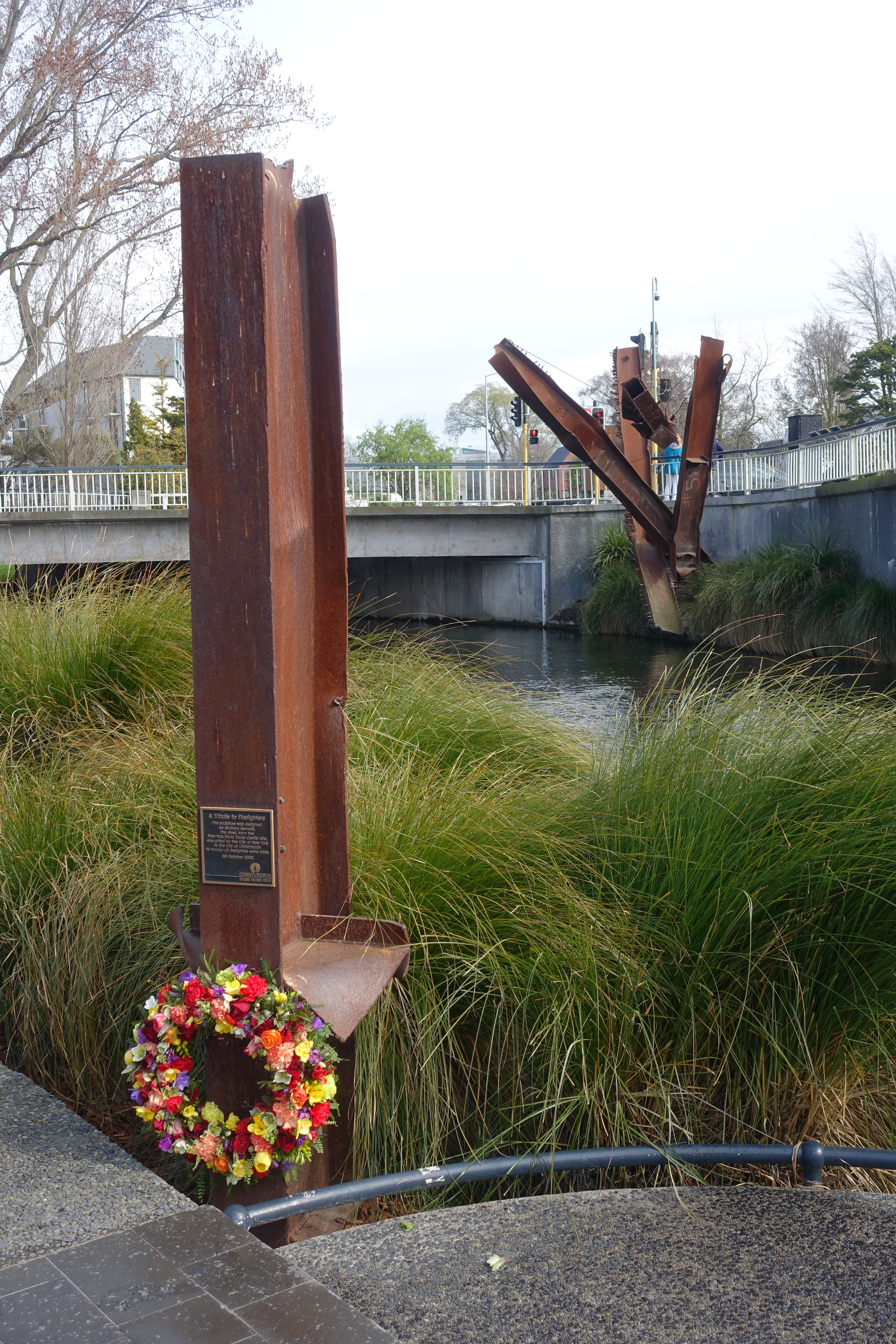
- Interactive map of Firefighters Reserve
- Type: Memorial
- Location: 318 Madras Street, Christchurch, New Zealand
- Coordinates: 43°31′36.5″S 172°38′35.4″E
- Opened: 26 October 2002
- Open: Year-round
- Status: Existing

The Firefighters Reserve is a memorial in Christchurch, New Zealand, for the first responders during the September 11 attacks on the United States in 2001. The reserve contains the A Tribute to Firefighters monument, which has steel girders which were originally in the Twin Towers. First responders gather around the monument every year on the attacks' anniversary.

== History ==
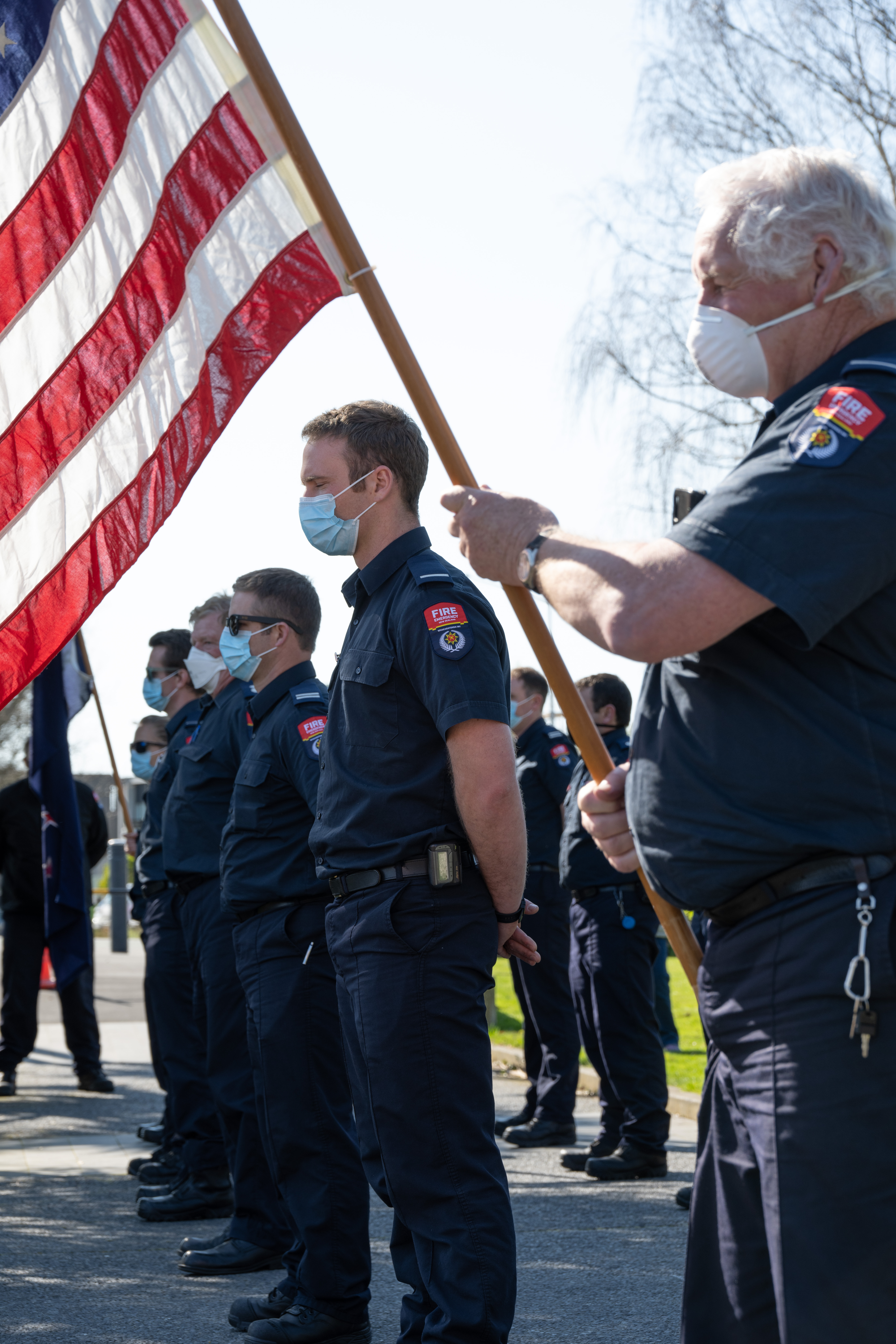
Memorial service held in 2021

After the September 11 attacks, New York City gifted Christchurch steel girders which were originally in the Twin Towers. This was used in the monument A Tribute to Firefighters when it was opened on 26 October 2002 in Christchurch beside the Avon River / Ōtākaro. It was created by Graham Bennett. In order to repair two bridges, the structure was moved in September 2014 to land owned by the Oxford Terrace Baptist Church. It was moved back in February 2015. In April 2015 the steel structure was vandalised with red spray paint.

== See also ==
- Memorials and services for the September 11 attacks
