= Ron Sang =

New Zealand architect (1938–2021)

- Ron Sang photographed by Gil Hanly in 1991
- Born: Ronald Fong Sang; 11 July 1938; Fiji
- Died: 11 June 2021 (aged 82); Auckland, New Zealand
- Occupation: Architect

Ronald Fong Sang( Chinese name: 方勵涵 ） ONZM JP (11 July 1938 – 11 June 2021) was a New Zealand architect, art collector, art exhibitor and publisher of New Zealand art books.

== Early life ==
Sang was born in Fiji in 1938 to parents who had migrated from southern China. He received his secondary education at Marist Brothers High School, Fiji, and, having arrived in Auckland in 1957, at St Peter's College, Grafton. He studied architecture at Auckland University College from 1958 to 1961. He became a registered architect in New Zealand in 1965. He joined an architectural practice which became Fairhead Sang and Carnachan Architects. In 1968, Sang set up his own practice.

== Architecture ==
As an architect, Sang engaged in both commercial and domestic architecture. He is noted for his design of a house for the photographer Brian Brake in Titirangi, West Auckland. The house has a Category 1 rating from Heritage New Zealand.

Sang had a special interest in using New Zealand artworks in domestic and commercial interiors. He was a committee member of the Aotea Centre Works of Art Committee from 1988. He developed a New Zealand art collection including paintings, prints, sculpture, pottery, and weaving. This collection included significant New Zealand artists such as Colin McCahon and Bill Hammond. Sang published books on New Zealand artists. In 2013, Sang was co-chairman of the Auckland Chinese Garden steering committee.

In the 2000 Queen's Birthday Honours, Sang was appointed an Officer of the New Zealand Order of Merit, for services to architecture and the arts.

== Later life and death ==
In March 2015, Sang auctioned off much of his personal art collection to fund his retirement, raising over $1.9 million. Sang died at his home in Auckland on 11 June 2021.

== Gallery ==
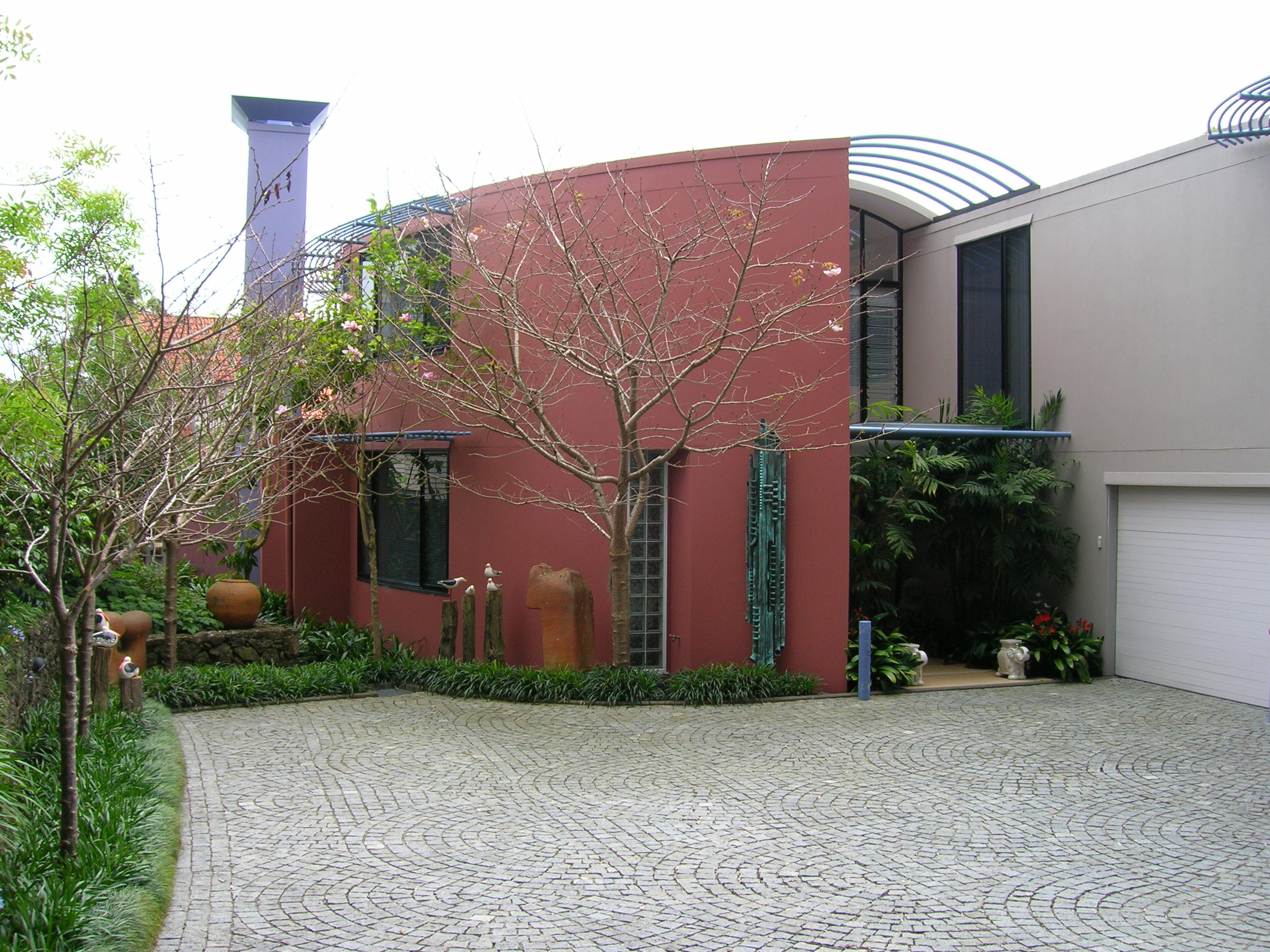
Sang's former residence in Epsom, Auckland

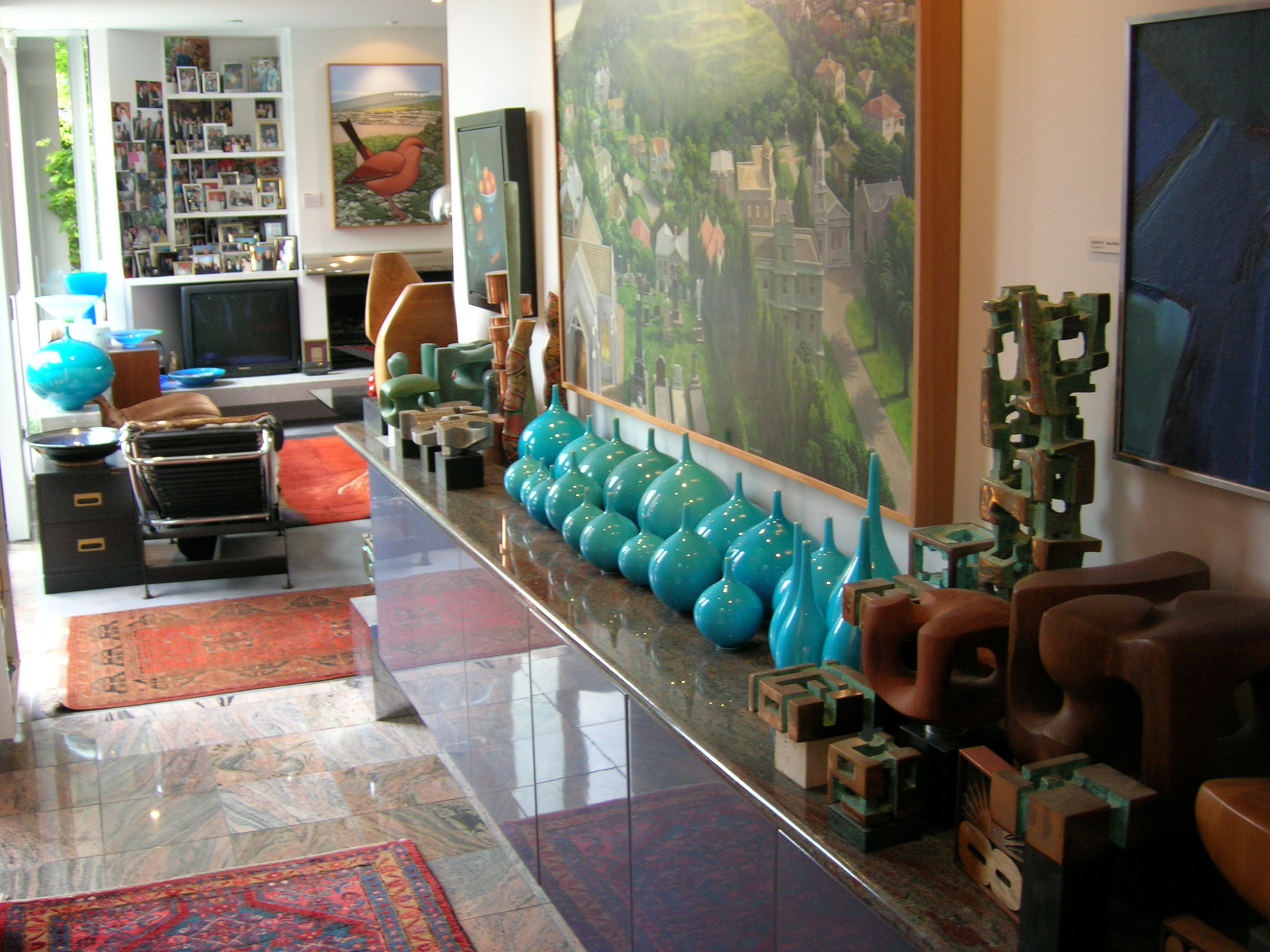
A selection of Sang's personal art collection, including pieces by Ann Robinson and Guy Ngan

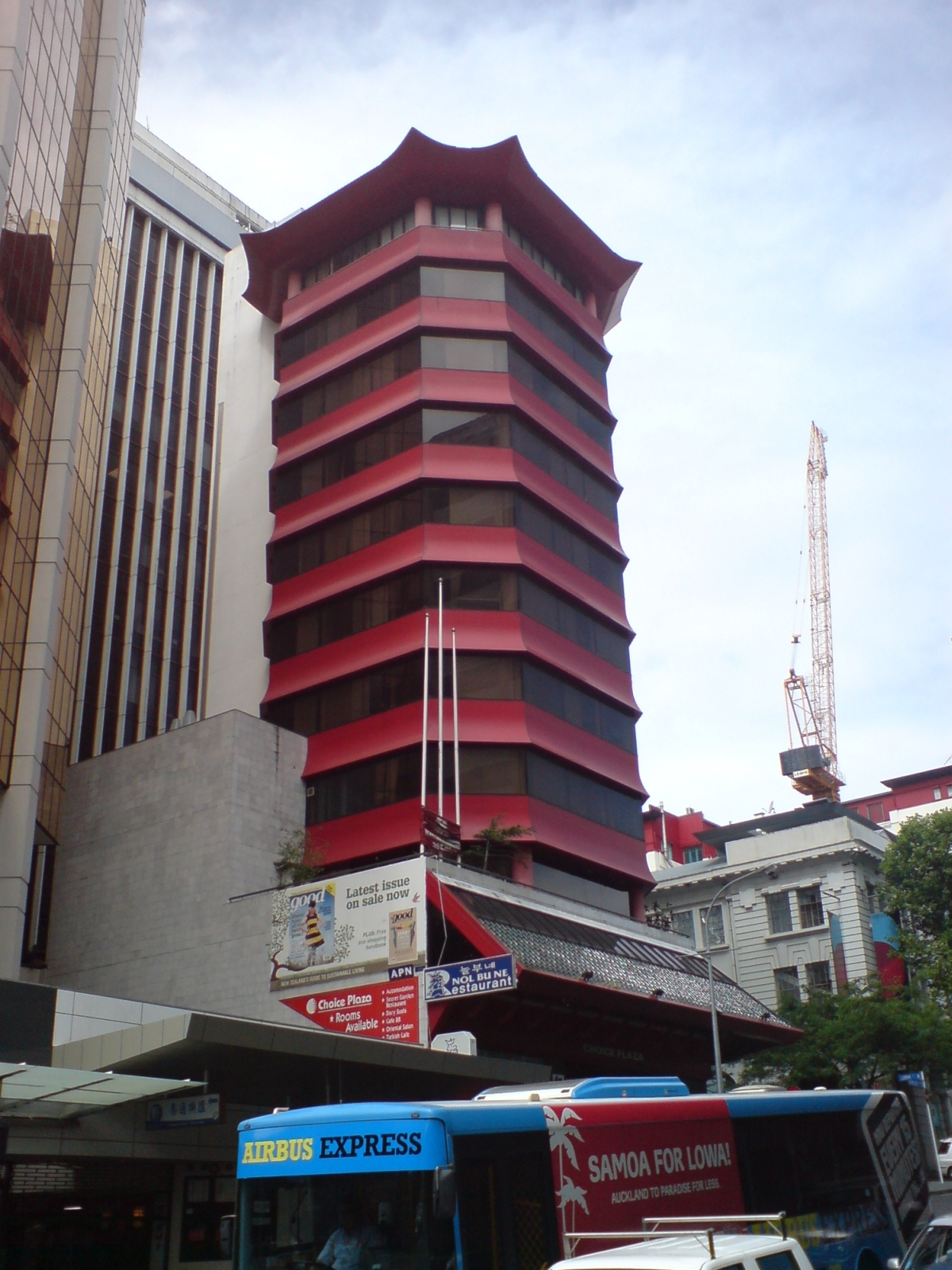
Choice Plaza, a 1989 building on Wellesley Street designed by Sang
