= Milford Galleries =

New Zealand art gallery

Milford Galleries is a dealer art gallery in New Zealand, with their headquarters in the city of Dunedin. There are two physical art spaces, in Dunedin and Queenstown, and there was also formerly a gallery in Auckland.

The galleries focus solely on New Zealand contemporary art (painting, photography, sculpture, and glassworks) and represent many of the country's leading artists, among them Graham Bennett, Joanna Braithwaite, Nigel Brown, Neil Dawson, Paul Dibble, Dick Frizzell, Darryn George, Jeffrey Harris, Michael Hight, Yuki Kihara, Andy Leleisi'uao, John Parker, J. S. Parker, Lisa Reihana, and Terry Stringer.

The galleries are run by the husband and wife team of Stephen Higginson and Niki Stewart.

== Dunedin ==
Milford's main gallery space – the largest dealer gallery in Dunedin – has operated from the former Hallenstein Brothers clothing factory in Dowling Street, between Princes Street and Queens Gardens, since 1989. The gallery comprises three art spaces, and often has more than one exhibition in progress at any one time. New exhibitions are hosted every five weeks.

The gallery space also contains an art store room, with works by many of the artists represented by the gallery.

== Queenstown ==
Milford Galleries in Queenstown, located on Gorge Road (previously located in Earl Street), comprises three exhibiting galleries. It has been operating since 2004.

== Auckland ==
Milford Galleries opened an Auckland branch in 1999, and curated touring shows by New Zealand contemporary artists until 2009.
