= Rona Bailey =

New Zealand dancer and activist (1914–2005)

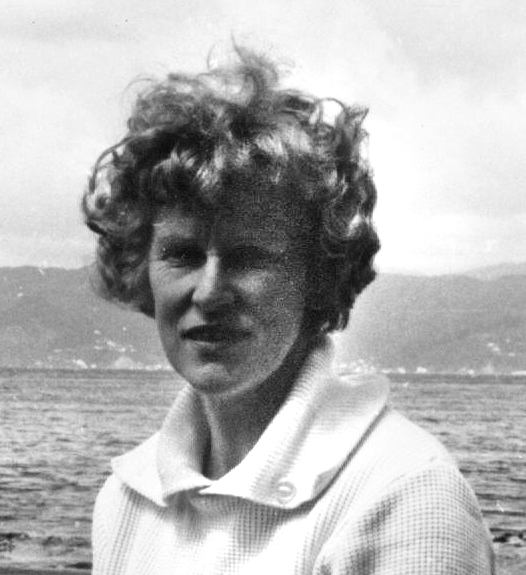
- Bailey at Breaker Bay in 1963
- Born: Rona Stephenson; 24 December 1914; Whanganui, New Zealand
- Died: 7 September 2005 (aged 90); Wellington, New Zealand
- Occupations: Dancer, educator, activist
- Spouses: Ron Meek (m. 1942; div. 1944); Chip Bailey (m. 1945; died 1963)

Rona Bailey (née Stephenson; 24 December 1914 – 7 September 2005) was a New Zealand drama and dance practitioner, educationalist and activist. Bailey was influential in emerging contemporary dance and professional theatre in New Zealand. She was an activist in the anti-apartheid movement in the 1970s and 1980s, and part of Treaty of Waitangi anti-racist education that started in the mid-1980s.

== Early life and education ==
Rona Bailey was born in Whanganui, New Zealand, on 24 December 1914. Her family moved to Gisborne where they ran a shoe shop. She trained as a teacher in Auckland and Christchurch. In 1937, she travelled to the United States to study modern dance initially at the University of California at Berkeley, and in 1938, she transferred to Columbia University in New York. While she was in the USA she was taught by Doris Humphry, Charles Weidman, Louis Horst and Lucille Czarnowski amongst others and saw many works of choreographer Martha Graham. Bailey married Ron Meek in 1942. They divorced two years later. Her second marriage was to Chip Bailey; they were married in 1945 and were active in supporting the waterside workers’ union during the 1951 New Zealand waterfront dispute. Rona and Chip Bailey participated in the creation of pro-union leaflets that were illegal under the National government's emergency regulations. Bailey's husband died young at age 42 from a brain tumour in 1963.

== Career ==
When Rona Bailey returned to New Zealand after studying in the United States, an early job of hers was as Physical Welfare Officer with the Department of Internal Affairs. This included incorporating modern dance techniques into the curriculum at Wellington Teachers’ Training College, which was influential in the physical education movement in New Zealand.

In 1945 Bailey along with Philip and Olive Smithells founded the New Dance Group that ran for two years. The New Dance Group was modelled after the New York-based company of the same name and in the short time of operating introduced ideas of dance and art to many dancers and audiences. Their dance was described in an article by Marianne Schultz as "modern, political and expressive".

Bailey was a long time colleague of theatre director and teacher Nola Millar and they were both part of Unity Theatre. In 1964 along with Anne Flannery they started the New Theatre School of Drama where Bailey taught movement. Following on from that was the birth of national drama training in New Zealand in 1970 when Bailey became one of the core tutors in the newly started New Zealand Drama School.

Bailey continued teaching at the New Zealand Drama School until 1988. She was instrumental in the schools journey to identify as a bicultural institution in its recognising the Treaty of Waitangi. This included adding a Māori language name, Te Kura Toi Whakaari o Aotearoa which was come to after Bailey consulted with Timoti Kāretu at the Māori Language Commission. The school is now known primarily as Toi Whakaari. Bailey in retrospect criticised the speed of the change.

It would have been preferable if [the Drama School] had waited a year, and then gone for the name. You need a track record first: and to have demonstrated your commitment. The journey is a hard one.

Rona Bailey was a member of Taki Rua Theatre (formally The Depot) that started in 1983 and she is described as one of the kaumātua (respected elder) of the theatre company.

One thing that Bailey was very proud of is her involvement with Project Waitangi. This was government funded education for non-Māori people in New Zealand that ran anti-racism and Treaty of Waitangi workshops, with a principal from pākehā (white New Zealanders) for pākehā. Bailey was a member of this project from when it started in 1985 until when the funding was withdrawn in 1990.

Rona Bailey was a collector of New Zealand ballads and folk songs, which she started while she was recovering from tuberculosis. She and Burt Roth published Shanties by the way (1967) a collection of New Zealand popular and radical folk songs. She was made a life member of the New Zealand Folklore Society in 1970.

== Activism and associations ==
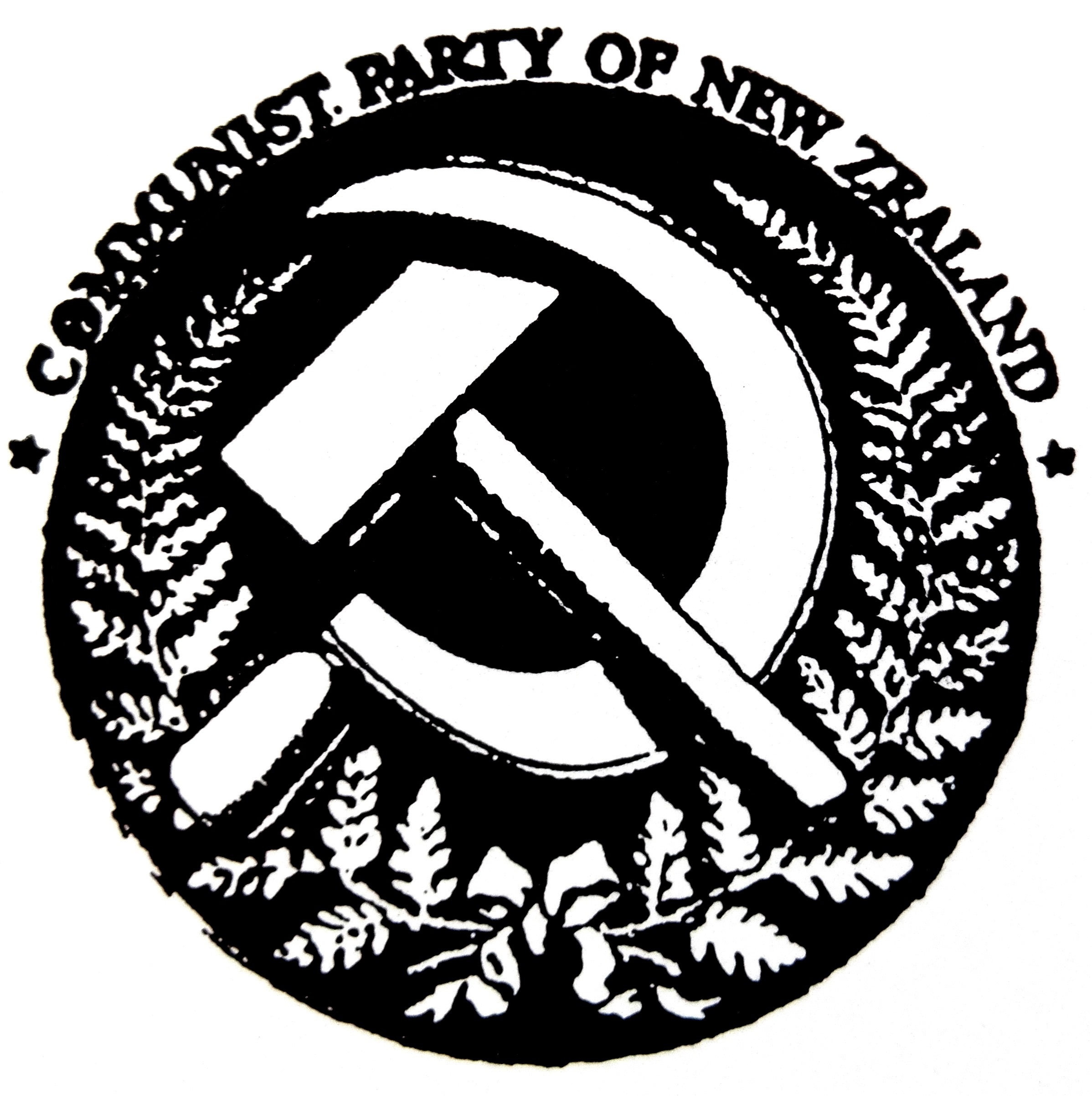
Logo from the Communist Party of New Zealand

Bailey first became interested in these politics while in the USA and later met members of the Communist Party of New Zealand through Unity Theatre. She joined in 1943 and was active for many years becoming a national committee member in the 1960s. There was a split in the party in the 1970s and Bailey was one of six prominent members that got de-registered and denounced as the 'Manson/Bailey Gang'.

In 1975 Bailey was a founder of the Wellington Marxist Leninist Organisation (WMLO) and in 1980 the Workers' Communist League (WCL) formed in 1980. She left the WCL in 1985.

For a time Bailey was elected president of the Public Service Association (PSA) women's committee and a women's representative on the executive with part of her work being campaigning for equal pay for women public servants.

Bailey was a long time member of the Labour History Project (formerly the Trade Union History Project).

In 1972 Bailey became treasurer of the National Anti-Apartheid Committee. She committed many years of her life to the anti-apartheid movement in New Zealand and was part of the protests against the 1981 South African rugby tour of New Zealand, she was injured by police at the Wellington protest on 29 July 1981.

== Legacy and death ==
Bailey died in Wellington in 2005, aged 90 years. The Labour History Project funds and organises a biennial public lecture, the Rona Bailey Memorial Lecture, which acknowledges her life and work. The work of the New Dance Group was presented in the biennial Rona Bailey Memorial Lecture in 2011 by Marianne Schultz and included students from the New Zealand School of Dance reconstructing the 1945 New Dance Group piece Sabotage in a Factory.

There is a room at Te Whaea, National Dance and Drama Centre in Wellington named the Rona Bailey Room. Bailey was recognised by the theatre community in 1996 receiving the Significant Contribution to Theatre award in the Wellington-based Chapman Tripp Theatre Awards, and The Museum of New Zealand Te Papa Tongarewa holds in its collections a typewriter of Bailey's amongst other items.
