= List of Croatian NBA players =

The list of Croatian players that play or have played in the National Basketball Association.

== Currently active players ==
The following is a list of current NBA players.

Note: Listed statistics are correct through the end of the 2025–26 season.

Entry Year	Player	Draft Year (Pick)	Drafted by	Current team	Former team(s) (Years)	Se.	SGP	PGP	Honours	Ref.
2015	Mario Hezonja	2008 (#5)	Orlando Magic	Cleveland Cavaliers (2026–present)	3 teams: Orlando Magic (2015–2018); New York Knicks (2018–2019); Portland Trail Blazers (2019–2020)	5	330	5	1 honour: Rising Stars (2016)	
2016	Ivica Zubac	2016 (#32)	Los Angeles Lakers	Indiana Pacers (2026–present)	2 teams: Los Angeles Lakers (2016–2019); Los Angeles Clippers 2019–2026	10	632	52	1 honour: NBA All-Defensive Second Team (2025)	
2024	Karlo Matković	2022 (#52)	New Orleans Pelicans	New Orleans Pelicans (2024–present)	—	2	104	0	—	

== Former players ==
The following is a list of former NBA players.

Years	Player	Draft Year (Pick)	Drafted by	Team(s) (Years)	Se.	SGP	PGP	Honours	Ref.
1989–1994	Dražen Petrović	1986 (#60)	Portland Trail Blazers	2 teams: Portland Trail Blazers (1989–1991); New Jersey Nets (1990–1993)	4	290	29	5 honours: Hall of Fame (2002); All-NBA Third Team (1993); All-Rookie First Team (1990); No. 3 retired by Nets; 1× Player of the Week	
1990–1992 1996–2000	Stojko Vranković	1986	Undrafted	3 teams: Boston Celtics (1990–1992); Minnesota Timberwolves (1996–1997); Los Angeles Clippers (1997–2000)	5	170	3	—	
1993–1996	Dino Rađa	1989 (#40)	Boston Celtics	Boston Celtics (1993–1996)	4	224	4	4 honours: Hall of Fame (2018); All-Rookie Second Team (1994); Rookie of the Month; Rising Stars (1994)	
1993–2006	Toni Kukoč	1990 (#29)	Chicago Bulls	4 teams: Chicago Bulls (1993–2000); Philadelphia 76ers (2000–2001); Atlanta Hawks (2001–2002); Milwaukee Bucks (2002–2006)	12	846	99	7 honours: Hall of Fame (2021); 3× NBA champion (1996–1998); NBA Sixth Man of the Year (1996); All-Rookie Second Team (1994); Rising Stars (1994)	
1994–1998 1999–2001	Žan Tabak	1991 (#51)	Houston Rockets	4 teams: Houston Rockets (1994–1995); Toronto Raptors (1995–1998); Boston Celtics (1998); Indiana Pacers (1999–2001)	6	247	20	1 honour: NBA champion (1995)	
1998–2005	Bruno Šundov	1998 (#35)	Dallas Mavericks	5 teams: Dallas Mavericks (1998–2000); Indiana Pacers (2000–2002); Boston Celtics (2002–2003); Cleveland Cavaliers (2003); New York Knicks (2004–2005)	7	102	1	—	
2000–2003	Dalibor Bagarić	2000 (#24)	Chicago Bulls	Chicago Bulls (2000–2003)	3	95	0	—	
2002–2008	Gordan Giriček	1999 (#40)	Dallas Mavericks	5 teams: Memphis Grizzlies (2002–2003); Orlando Magic (2003–2004); Utah Jazz (2004–2007); Philadelphia 76ers (2007–2008); Phoenix Suns (2008)	6	384	29	2 honours: All-Rookie Second Team (2003); Rising Stars (2003)	
2003–2006	Zoran Planinić	2003 (#22)	New Jersey Nets	New Jersey Nets (2003–2006)	3	148	12	—	
2004–2006	Mario Kasun	2002 (#41)	Los Angeles Clippers	Orlando Magic (2004–2006)	2	73	0	—	
2006–2007	Damir Markota	2006 (#59)	San Antonio Spurs	Milwaukee Bucks (2006–2007)	1	30	0	—	
2008–2010	Roko Ukić	2005 (#41)	Toronto Raptors	2 teams: Toronto Raptors (2008–2009); Milwaukee Bucks (2009–2010)	2	85	0	—	
2014–2017	Damjan Rudež	2008	Undrafted	3 teams: Indiana Pacers (2014–2015); Minnesota Timberwolves (2015–2016); Orlando Magic (2016–2017)	3	146	0	—	
2014–2024	Bojan Bogdanović	2011 (#31)	Miami Heat	6 teams: Brooklyn Nets (2014–2017); Washington Wizards (2017); Indiana Pacers (2017–2019); Utah Jazz (2019–2022); Detroit Pistons (2022–2024); New York Knicks (2024)	10	719	51	6 honours: All-Rookie Second Team (2015); 2× Player of the Week; Rookie of the Month; Rising Stars (2015, 2016)	
2016–2020	Dragan Bender	2016 (#4th)	Phoenix Suns	3 teams: Phoenix Suns (2016–2019); Milwaukee Bucks (2019–2020); Golden State Warriors (2020)	4	187	0	—	
2016	Duje Dukan	2015	Undrafted	Sacramento Kings (2016)	1	1	0	—	

Players who are still active overseas

Years	Player	Draft Year (Pick)	Drafted by	Team(s) (Years)	Se.	SGP	PGP	Honours	Current club	Ref.
2016–2025	Dario Šarić	2014 (#12)	Orlando Magic	7 teams: Philadelphia 76ers (2016–2019); Minnesota Timberwolves 2019); Phoenix Suns (2019–2023); Oklahoma City Thunder (2022–2023); Golden State Warriors (2023–2024); Denver Nuggets (2024–2025); Sacramento Kings (2025–2025–26)	9	498	24	5 honours: All-Rookie First Team (2017); 2× Rookie of the Month; Rising Stars (2017, 2018)	Anadolu Efes, Türkiye	
2017–2020	Ante Žižić	2016 (#23)	Boston Celtics	Cleveland Cavaliers (2017-2020)	3	113	0	—	Beşiktaş, Türkiye	
2019–2021 2022–2024	Luka Šamanić	2019 (#19)	San Antonio Spurs	2 teams: San Antonio Spurs (2019-2021); Utah Jazz (2022–2024)	4	86	0	—	UNICS Kazan, Russia	

== Drafted players ==
The following is a list of drafted players who have never appeared in an NBA regular season or playoff game.

Draft year (Pick)	Player	Drafted by	Status
1973 (#84)	Krešimir Ćosić	Los Angeles Lakers	Retired, played his entire career overseas
1987 (#159)	Franjo Arapović	Atlanta Hawks	Retired, played his entire career overseas
2000 (#47)	Josip Sesar	Seattle SuperSonics, rights traded to Boston Celtics	Retired, played his entire career overseas
2007 (#39)	Stanko Barać	Miami Heat, rights traded to Dallas Mavericks	Retired, played his entire career overseas
2008 (#44)	Ante Tomić	Utah Jazz, rights traded to New York Knicks	Currently playing for Joventut Badalona, Spain
2009 (#50)	Goran Suton	Utah Jazz	Retired, played his entire career overseas
2012 (#56)	Tomislav Zubčić	Toronto Raptors, rights traded to Oklahoma City Thunder	Currently playing for Astros de Jalisco, Mexico

== Other players ==
=== Players born in Croatia ===
- (United States) Nat Hickey (born on Korčula, Kingdom of Dalmatia, Austria-Hungary as Nikola Zarnecić)
- (Serbia) Kosta Perović (born in Osijek, SR Croatia, SFR Yugoslavia)
- (Serbia) Predrag Savović (born in Pula, SR Croatia, SFR Yugoslavia)
- (Serbia) Predrag Stojaković (born in Slavonska Požega, SR Croatia, SFR Yugoslavia)

=== Players with Croatian citizenship ===
- (United States) Justin Hamilton
- (United States) Oliver Lafayette

== See also ==
- NBA draft
- List of National Basketball Association players by country
