= Ronald L. Meek =

New Zealand economist (1917–1978)

- Born: 27 July 1917; Wellington, New Zealand
- Died: 18 August 1978 (aged 61)

Academic background
- Education: Victoria University of Wellington (ML); University of Cambridge (PhD)
- Thesis: "The concept of surplus in the history of economic thought from Mun to Mill" (1949)
- Doctoral advisor: Piero Sraffa, Maurice Dobb

Academic work
- School or tradition: Marxian economics
- Institutions: University of Glasgow (1948–1963); University of Leicester (1963–1978)
- Main interests: classical political economy, labour theory of value
- Notable works: Studies in the Labour Theory of Value (1956, 1973)

Ronald Lindley Meek (27 July 1917 – 18 August 1978) was a Marxian economist and social scientist known especially for his scholarly studies of classical political economy and the labour theory of value. During the 1960s and 1970s, his writings were influential in the Western academic discussion about Marx's economic theory.

What still makes Meek's texts interesting today, is that he paid close attention to primary sources and to the history of political economy, pioneered new interpretations, and studied (in the late 1940s and 1950s) with some of the top scholars in the field, including Maurice Dobb and Piero Sraffa. In addition, Meek analyzed the attitudes of philosophers and political economists in the colonial epoch towards indigenous peoples, long before this became a recognized academic pursuit.

== Life and career ==
Ron Meek was born in 1917, in Wellington, New Zealand, where he attended school and entered Victoria University in the mid-1930s, initially to study law, and later commerce. There he became interested in the thought of Karl Marx, theatre and local left-wing politics. After the worst years of the Great Depression, the First Labour Government of New Zealand had been elected in 1935, and there was a lot of interest in politics.

Many of Meek's articles of that period, in New Zealand journals like The Spike, Salient and Tomorrow, were written under pseudonyms. This was not a matter of cowardice, but a necessity, as New Zealand had very harsh sedition and censorship laws at that time. Meek's articles included critical commentary on New Zealand history and politics as well as covering overseas politics. As a keen participant in student drama clubs, he wrote quite a few plays, skits, poems and songs, often with parodic styles, whacky humour and satirical themes. He was also involved many times in organizing student festivities.

In 1939, he graduated with a Masters in Law, and was awarded a fellowship for study at Cambridge University in England. However, World War II intervened, and his graduate studies at Cambridge were delayed for six years.

Ron Meek was a founder of the People's Theatre in Hamilton, where he met his first wife Rona Stephenson (better known as Rona Bailey) who was a fellow communist. They were married in Hamilton, on 22 December 1942. They divorced in December 1944, and on 15 June 1945 Rona remarried to the communist trade-unionist Reginald John ("Chip") Bailey who was active in the Unity Theatre in Wellington.

Meek's first published monograph, a pamphlet called Maori Problems Today (1942), discussed a topic which had previously received little attention from the Communist Party of New Zealand. His 1946 lecture to the Wellington Branch of the New Zealand Geographical Society on Maori emancipation was published in the New Zealand Geographer. Meek's 1976 book Social Science and the Ignoble Savage was partly inspired by his New Zealand experience.

In 1946 Meek moved to Cambridge, England, with a Strathcona studentship to read for a Ph.D. under Piero Sraffa and Maurice Dobb. Two years later, in October 1948, he moved to the University of Glasgow in Scotland, where he became university lecturer in the Department of Political Economy and learnt to play the piano (another leisure pursuit was hill-walking on the Isle of Arran in the Firth of Clyde).

In 1949, he completed his Cambridge doctoral thesis, on the development of the concept of surplus in economic thought, from Thomas Mun to John Stuart Mill. He remarried in Glasgow on 20 October 1951, to the 25 year-old Slavist, writer and editor Dorothea Luise Schulz, of German origin. The couple had two children, Roger Duncan (b. 10 July 1958) and Alison Fiona (b. 31 October 1959).

His first major work, Studies in the Labour Theory of Value, was published by Lawrence & Wishart in 1956 (a second, revised edition was later published by Monthly Review Press, in 1973). The main aim of the book was "to build some sort of bridge between Marxian economists and their non-Marxian colleagues so that the latter can at least be made to see what the former are trying to get at". Meek's work was widely read and influenced the discussion of Marxian, Ricardian and post-Keynesian economics in the 1960s and 1970s.

In 1956, Meek quit the Communist Party of Great Britain and he abandoned his previous support for the policies of Joseph Stalin, although he continued to be a Marxist until his last years. He was acknowledged to be a scholarly authority on Adam Smith and on the Physiocrats. In the introduction to an article from 1971, "Smith, Turgot and the 'Four Stages' Theory," Ron Meek wrote: "In the good old days, when I was a fierce young Marxist instead of a benign middle-aged Meeksist, I became very interested in the work of the members of the so-called Scottish historical school..."

Meek was lecturer in Political Economy at Glasgow until 1959, and Senior Lecturer from 1960 to 1963. Graduates “placed him top of their list of lecturers in economics”. From 1963 until his untimely death in 1978 (when he was 61), he was Tyler Professor of Economics at the University of Leicester, where he initiated a B.Sc. course in Economics and a Public Sector Economics Research Centre. His intellectual legacy includes numerous books and articles on classical political economy, Marxian and Sraffian economics, as well as on electricity pricing and social theory.

According to Eileen Appelbaum, towards the end of his life Meek wanted to revisit a theoretical issue which he had investigated in his Phd thesis two decades earlier:

"At the time of his death, Meek was engaged in a reexamination of theories of relative price and income distribution in terms of the changing attitudes of economists toward the concept of surplus. In particular, he wanted to compare the uses to which Marx and Sraffa each put this concept, and to comment from this perspective on contemporary controversies between Marxists and 'neo-Ricardians.'"

In an essay first presented in 1975, Meek indicated in outline his position on the new theoretical conflict which was brewing between New Left Marxists and heterodox neo-Ricardians, about the Marxian transformation problem and Piero Sraffa's contributions. Marxian scholars of Meek's generation had generally regarded Sraffa as a friend of Marx, of the Left and of socialism; in the cold war era, Sraffa had done much to restore the scientific credibility of classical political economy. However, the younger generation of Marxist academics was often much more critical of Sraffa's economics. Sraffa's abandonment of Marx's theory of value, and his silence about the issue of the exploitation of labour power, seemed to be incompatible with Marx's analysis in Das Kapital. For their part, the neo-Ricardians usually regarded Marxist economic orthodoxy as unscientific and incoherent. Thus, the cohabitation of Marxism and Ricardianism, which Meek had experienced as a British academic during the 1950s and 1960s, gave way to opposed camps of "orthodox" Marxists and "heterodox" neo-Ricardian economists in the 1970s and 1980s.

== Works ==
=== Books ===
- Maori Problems Today: A Short Survey, Wellington: Progressive Publishing Society, 1942
- (ed., trans. with Dorothea L. Meek) Marx and Engels on Malthus: Selections from the Writings of Marx and Engels Dealing with the Theories of Thomas Robert Malthus, London: Lawrence and Wishart, 1953; revised edition: Marx and Engels on the Population Bomb: Selections from the Writings of Marx and Engels Dealing with the Theories of Thomas Robert Malthus, Berkeley, CA: The Ramparts Press, 1971
- Studies in the Labour Theory of Value, London: Lawrence and Wishart, 1956; revised edition 1973
- The Economics of Physiocracy: Essays and Translations, London: George Allen & Unwin, 1962
- Hill-walking in Arran: Routes Up the Main Hills and Ridges in the North of the Isle of Arran, Edinburgh: W.R. Chambers, 1963
- The Rise and Fall of the Concept of the Economic Machine, Leicester: Leicester University Press, 1965
- Economics and Ideology and Other Essays: Studies in the Development of Economic Thought, London: Chapman & Hall, 1967
- Figuring Out Society: An Introduction to the Use of Quantitative Methods in the Social Sciences, London: Fontana, 1971
- (ed. with Marguerite Kuczynski) François Quesnay, Quesnay's "Tableau Economique", London: Macmillan, 1972
- (ed.) Anne Robert Jacques Turgot, Turgot on Progress, Sociology and Economics, Cambridge: Cambridge University Press, 1973
- (ed.) Precursors of Adam Smith, London: Dent, 1973
- Social Science and the Ignoble Savage, Cambridge: Cambridge University Press, 1976
- Smith, Marx and After: Ten Essays in the Development of Economic Thought, London: Chapman and Hall, 1977
- (ed., with D. D. Raphael and Peter Stein) Adam Smith, Lectures on Jurisprudence, Oxford: Clarendon Press, 1978; reprinted at Indianapolis: Liberty Fund, 1982
- (with Ian G. Bradley) Matrices and Society: Matrix Algebra and Its Applications in the Social Sciences, Harmondsworth: Penguin, 1986; reprinted at Princeton: Princeton University Press, 1987.

=== Selected articles ===
- "The Rehabilitation of Ricardo", The Listener, 4 Oct 1951
- "New Light on the Labour Theory of Value", The Listener, 7 Aug 1952
- The Scottish Contribution to Marxist Sociology", in John Saville (ed.), Democracy and the Labour Movement, 1954
- "Adam Smith and the Classical Concept of Profits", Scottish Journal of Political Economy, June 1954
- "The Decline of Ricardian Economics in England", Economica, 1950
- "Stalin as an Economist", The Review of Economic Studies, volume 21, issue 3, 1953, pp. 232–239
- "Rates of Growth" (book review of W. W. Rostow, The Stages of Economic Growth; Maurice Dobb, An Essay on Economic Growth and Planning; and Isaac Deutscher, The Great Contest), New Left Review, series I no. 6, November–December 1960
- "Smith, Turgot and the Four Stages Theory", 1971, History of Political Economy 1971
- "Marxism and Marginalism", History of Political Economy 1972
- "The Falling Rate of Profit", in M.C. Howard and J.E. King (eds.), Economics of Marx, 1976
