= Rookie of the Month Award =

Rookie of the Month Award may refer to:

- Major League Baseball Rookie of the Month Award, presented by Major League Baseball
- NBA Rookie of the Month Award, presented by the National Basketball Association
