= New Orleans Pelicans =

National Basketball Association team in New Orleans, Louisiana

- 2026–27 New Orleans Pelicans season
- Conference: Western
- Division: Southwest
- Founded: 2002 (Note: Originally established as the original Charlotte Hornets in 1988, before being retroactively separated from the Charlotte history in 2014 when the current Charlotte Hornets reclaimed their original franchise name. The New Orleans Pelicans have since been recognized by the league as a 2002 expansion team. Before this, the team's history was recognized as being a relocation from Charlotte.)
- History: New Orleans Hornets; 2002–2005, 2007–2013; New Orleans/Oklahoma City Hornets; 2005–2007; New Orleans Pelicans; 2013–present
- Arena: Smoothie King Center
- Location: New Orleans, Louisiana
- Team colors: Navy blue, gold, red
- Main sponsor: NewAge Products
- President: Dennis Lauscha
- Vice-presidents: Joe Dumars, Troy Weaver
- Head coach: Jamahl Mosley
- Ownership: Gayle Benson
- Affiliation: Laketown Squadron
- Championships: 0
- Conference titles: 0
- Division titles: 1 (2008)
- Retired numbers: 1 (7)
- Website: nba.com/pelicans
Association	Icon

The New Orleans Pelicans are an American professional basketball team based in New Orleans. The Pelicans compete in the National Basketball Association (NBA) as a member of the Southwest Division of the Western Conference. The team plays its home games at Smoothie King Center.

The Pelicans were established as the New Orleans Hornets in the 2002–03 season when George Shinn, then owner of the Charlotte Hornets, relocated the franchise to New Orleans. Due to the damage caused by Hurricane Katrina in 2005, the team temporarily relocated to Oklahoma City, where they spent two seasons as the New Orleans/Oklahoma City Hornets before returning to New Orleans for the 2007–08 season. In 2013, the Hornets announced that they would change their name to the New Orleans Pelicans.

In 22 seasons of play since the original franchise relocated from Charlotte, the New Orleans franchise has achieved an overall regular season record of 831–937 (.470) and qualified for the playoffs nine times. Their achievements include two playoff series victories and one division title.

== History ==
=== Basketball in New Orleans ===
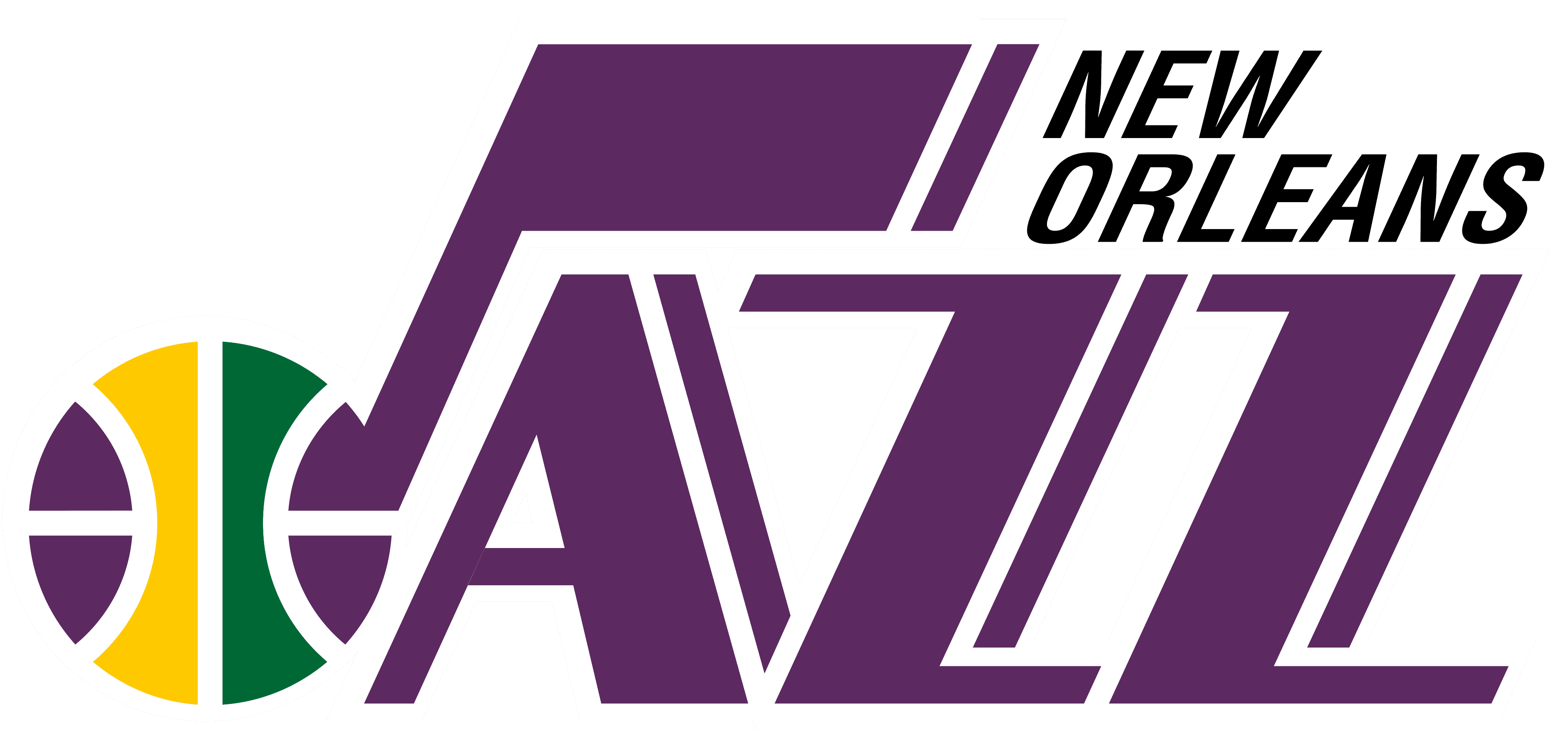
The Jazz briefly played in New Orleans in the late 1970s and took their team identity from the city's musical history.

New Orleans had been a founding member of the ABA with the New Orleans Buccaneers (1967–1970), but the lack of a dedicated arena and a poor performance record led the team to relocate to Memphis. The city acquired an NBA expansion franchise in June 1974: the New Orleans Jazz (as a tribute to New Orleans' history of originating jazz music). The team faced a number of the same logistical and financial woes, and relocated to Salt Lake City in 1979–80.

One of the few bright spots during the Jazz's tenure in New Orleans was the acquisition of "Pistol" Pete Maravich (who had played college basketball at LSU). Although he was considered one of the most entertaining players in the league and won the scoring championship for the 1976–77 season with 31.1 points per game, the Jazz's best record while in New Orleans was 39–43 in the 1977–78 season.

In 1994, the Minnesota Timberwolves were suffering financially and an ownership group almost purchased the team and moved it to New Orleans. The Timberwolves would have played at the Louisiana Superdome until a new arena was constructed. Financial problems, however, led to the NBA blocking the move. New Orleans would attempt to chase the Vancouver Grizzlies before finally landing another team in 2002.

=== 2002–2005: The relocation and early years in New Orleans ===
While the Charlotte Hornets put a competitive team on the court throughout the 1990s, the team's attendance began falling dramatically. Many attributed this lapse in popularity to the team's owner, George Shinn, who was slowly becoming despised by the people of the city. In 1997, a Charlotte woman filed a rape allegation against Shinn, prompting a trial that ultimately damaged his reputation in the city. The consensus was that while Charlotte was a basketball city, fans took out their anger at Shinn on the team. Shinn had also become discontented with the Charlotte Coliseum, which had been considered state-of-the-art when it opened but had since been considered obsolete due to a limited number of luxury boxes. On March 26, 2001, both the Hornets and the Vancouver Grizzlies applied for relocation to Memphis, Tennessee, which was ultimately won by the Grizzlies. Shinn then issued an ultimatum that unless the city built a new arena at no cost to him, the Hornets would leave town. The city initially refused, leading Shinn to consider moving the team to either Norfolk, Louisville, or St. Louis. Of the cities in the running, only St. Louis had an NBA-ready arena, the Savvis Center, already in place and was a larger media market than Charlotte at the time; also, it was the only one of the three to have previously hosted an NBA franchise—the St. Louis Hawks, who moved to Atlanta in 1968.

Investigations into the Louisville Cardinals men's basketball program uncovered information regarding a non-binding agreement made around this time period to move the Hornets to Louisville. At the time, Louisville officials were in the early stages of building a new arena. A group of businessmen and politicians from Louisville signed a non-binding agreement with the Hornets to move the team to Louisville, as long as they built a new arena downtown. Louisville officials were in the early planning process of building what would be the KFC Yum! Center. Louisville officials were eager to bring the NBA team to Louisville, whose last professional basketball team was the ABAs Kentucky Colonels. However, Louisville Basketball's newly hired head coach Rick Pitino and athletic director Tom Jurich were publicly opposed to the idea of bringing a professional sports team to Louisville, which led to the deal falling through. David Stern recalled thinking, "If Rick Pitino doesn't want us there, why would we go?"

Finally, a new arena in Uptown, which would eventually become the Spectrum Center, was included in a non-binding referendum for a larger arts-related package, and Shinn withdrew his application to move the team. Polls showed the referendum on its way to passage. However, just days before the referendum, Mayor Pat McCrory vetoed a living wage ordinance. The veto prompted many of the city's African American ministers to oppose the referendum; they felt it was immoral for the city to build a new arena when city employees were not paid enough to make a living. After the referendum failed, city leaders devised a plan to build a new arena in a way that did not require voter support, but made it known that they would not even consider building it unless Shinn sold the team. While even the NBA acknowledged that Shinn had alienated fans, league officials felt such a demand would anger other owners as it could set a precedent. The city council refused to remove the statement, leading the Hornets to request a move to New Orleans—a move which would eventually return the NBA to that city for the first time since the Jazz moved to Salt Lake City in 1979. Before the Hornets were eliminated from the playoffs, the NBA approved the move. As part of a deal, the NBA promised that Charlotte would get a new team, which took the court two years later as the Charlotte Bobcats.

In a 2008 interview with The Charlotte Observer, Shinn, who has not returned to Charlotte since the Hornets moved, admitted that the "bad judgment I made in my life" played a role in the Hornets' departure. He also said that if he had it to do all over again, he would not have withdrawn from the public after the sexual assault trial. Shinn emphasized how he was making amends by committing to New Orleans saying, "I've made enough mistakes in my life. I'm not going to make one here. This city needs us here. We're going to make this (New Orleans) thing work."

The Hornets opened their inaugural season in New Orleans on October 30, 2002, against New Orleans' original NBA franchise, the Utah Jazz. In the first regular season NBA game played in New Orleans in over 17 years, the Hornets defeated the Jazz 100–75, and posthumously retired #7 of "Pistol" Pete Maravich during halftime. The Hornets finished the season with a 47–35 record but were defeated by the Philadelphia 76ers in the First Round of the 2003 playoffs. Following the season, the team unexpectedly fired head coach Paul Silas and replaced him with Tim Floyd. The Hornets began the 2003–04 season strong with a 17–7 start but sputtered at the end and finished 41–41. They lost to the Miami Heat in the First Round of the 2004 playoffs. After the season, Floyd was fired and the team hired Byron Scott as its new head coach.

During the first two seasons in New Orleans, the Hornets competed in the NBA's Eastern Conference. The 2004–05 season saw the team move to the Western Conference's Southwest Division to even the number of teams in each conference after the Charlotte Bobcats started play in their inaugural season of that same year. In a season marred by injuries to the team's three all-stars, the team finished the year with a franchise-worst record of 18–64.

=== 2005–2011: The Chris Paul era ===
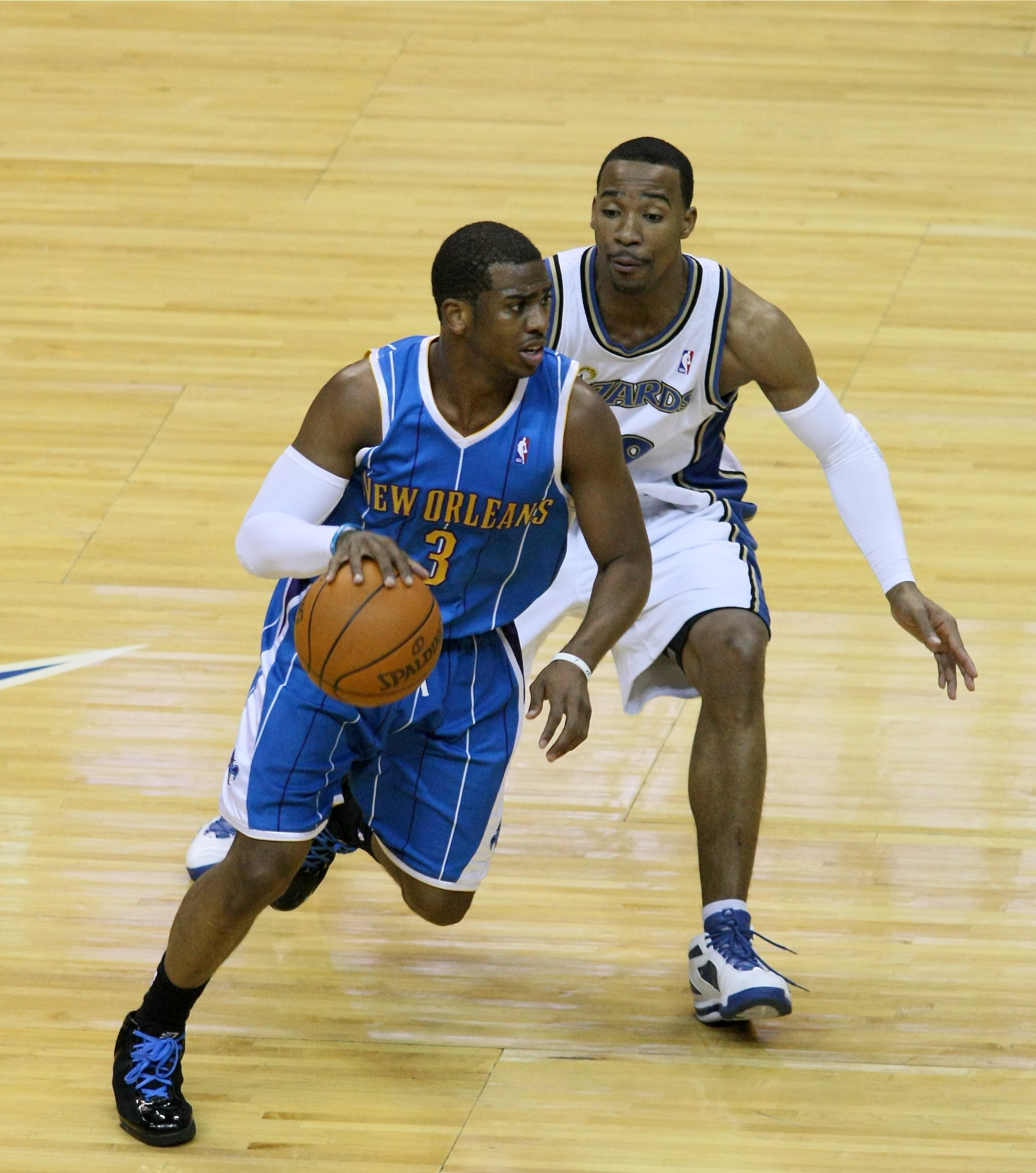
Chris Paul, selected by the Hornets as the fourth pick of the 2005 NBA draft

In the subsequent draft, the Hornets used their first-round pick to select point guard Chris Paul out of Wake Forest University. Because of the catastrophic devastation brought by Hurricane Katrina upon the communities of southeastern Louisiana, the Hornets franchise temporarily relocated its base of operations to Oklahoma City, Oklahoma, in 2005–06 and 2006–07, posting records of 38–44 and 39–43 respectively. During this time, the franchise was known as the New Orleans/Oklahoma City Hornets. In these two seasons, most home games were played at the Ford Center in Oklahoma City, while a few remained at New Orleans Arena. One year after the Hornets moved back to New Orleans permanently, the Seattle SuperSonics relocated to Oklahoma City and became the Oklahoma City Thunder.

The Hornets franchise returned to New Orleans full-time for the 2007–08 season, with all 41 home games in the New Orleans Arena. The 2008 NBA All-Star Game and its accompanying festivities were awarded to New Orleans and a serious marketing campaign was commenced in February 2007. Healthier than previous seasons, the Hornets opened the season with a 29–12 record at the halfway mark, completing the regular season with a record of 56–26, making the season their most successful ever. The Hornets also won their first division title, winning the Southwest Division. Having clinched the second overall seed for the Western Conference in the 2008 playoffs, the Hornets beat the Dallas Mavericks in the first round, but then lost to the defending-champion San Antonio Spurs in seven games in the conference semifinals.

In August 2008, the Hornets unveiled a modified logo and new uniforms with the colors of Creole blue, purple, and Mardi Gras gold. Pinstripes were also added to the uniforms. The Hornets also introduced a new gold alternate uniform in 2010 which was used mostly in games played on Saturday at home and on the road. The Hornets finished the 2008–09 season with a 49–33 record. Facing the Denver Nuggets in the first round of the 2009 playoffs, the Hornets were eliminated in five games. The Hornets started the 2009–10 season with a 3–6 record and fired head coach Byron Scott. General manager Jeff Bower took over the head coaching duties for the remainder of the season. The Hornets finished the season with a 37–45 record and last in the Southwest Division they had won two seasons prior. Jeff Bower resigned as head coach and Monty Williams was brought in as new head coach. The team finished the 2010–11 season with a 46–36 record and qualified for the 2011 NBA playoffs, where they lost to the Lakers four games to two.

In December 2010, the NBA purchased the Hornets from George Shinn for an estimated $300 million.

==== 2011: The departure of Chris Paul ====
Before the 2011–12 season, the Hornets were considering trade offers for Chris Paul and he requested a trade to the New York Knicks. The Hornets looked at many teams, including the Boston Celtics and the Golden State Warriors as trade partners, but Paul had made it clear he wanted to be traded to New York or Los Angeles. A three-team trade involving the Los Angeles Lakers and the Houston Rockets was agreed upon, but commissioner David Stern, acting as the President of Basketball Operations for the Hornets (which were owned by the league office at that time) rejected the trade. On December 14, 2011, the Hornets agreed to a deal with the Los Angeles Clippers that would send Paul to Los Angeles in exchange for Eric Gordon, Chris Kaman, Al-Farouq Aminu, and a first-round draft pick acquired by the Clippers from a trade with the Minnesota Timberwolves in 2004.

=== 2012–2019: The Anthony Davis era ===
==== 2012–2013: Beginning of the Anthony Davis era ====
On April 13, 2012, it was announced that Tom Benson, owner of the National Football League's New Orleans Saints, had purchased the franchise from the NBA for $338 million. In addition, Benson announced that he would change the team name to something that would better suit the region, fueling rumors that the Hornets name could one day return to Charlotte, where the Charlotte Bobcats had been playing since 2004. In June 2012, Benson appointed two senior Saints executives to supervise the Hornets: Saints' general manager Mickey Loomis became head of basketball operations, overseeing general manager Dell Demps, and Saints' business operations head Dennis Lauscha took on the same role with the Hornets.

The Hornets traded Emeka Okafor and Trevor Ariza to the Wizards for Rashard Lewis, whom they bought out, and a draft pick.

On May 30, 2012, the Hornets were awarded the first overall pick in the 2012 NBA draft and subsequently drafted Anthony Davis. Some people believed that David Stern rigged the draft lottery to give the Hornets the first overall pick, citing a picture of Davis in a Hornets hat as evidence. They also drafted Austin Rivers with the 10th pick (acquired from the Clippers as part of the Chris Paul trade).

On July 11, 2012, Ryan Anderson, 2012's Most Improved Player and three-point field goals leader, was acquired by the New Orleans Hornets in a sign-and-trade with the Orlando Magic for Gustavo Ayón.

==== 2013–2015: Hornets to Pelicans ====
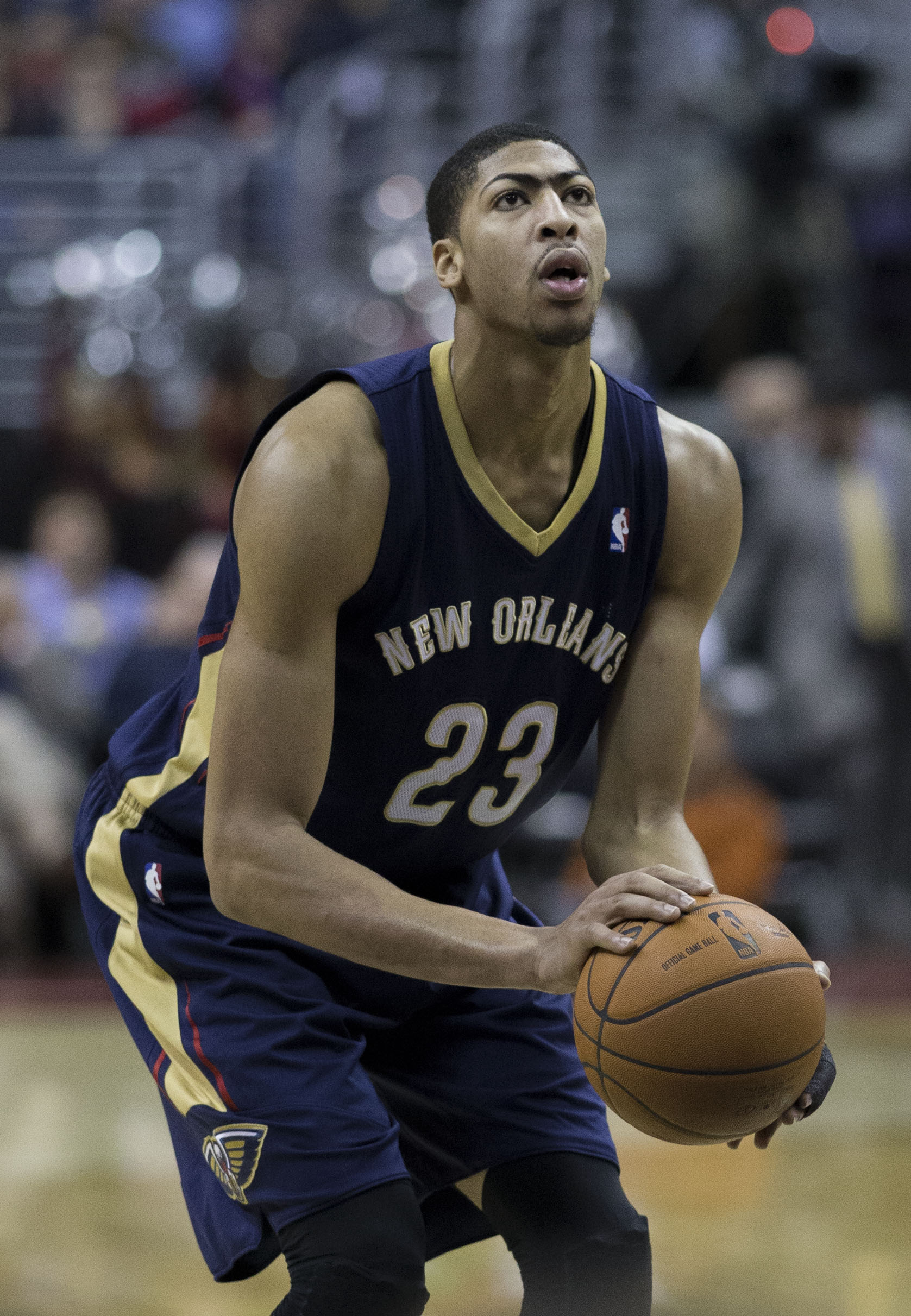
Anthony Davis, seen here in 2014, was drafted first overall by New Orleans in 2012 and subsequently became the focal point of the team for many years.

New owner Tom Benson had indicated early in his ownership that he wished to change the team's name to something more local, even preferring that the Utah Jazz – founded in New Orleans in 1974 and played there until 1979 – give up the "Jazz" name, but the Jazz indicated they had no interest in returning the name due to over 30 years of history associated with it. Benson had also heavily favored the names "Brass" and "Krewe".

However, on December 4, 2012, it was reported that the Hornets would change their name to the New Orleans Pelicans beginning with the 2013–14 season. The team name is inspired by Louisiana's state bird, the brown pelican.

The name "Pelicans" previously had been used by a minor-league baseball team that played in New Orleans from 1901 to 1957. The Hornets organization officially confirmed the name change in a press conference held on January 24, 2013, where officials unveiled the team's new logos and navy blue–gold–red color scheme. On April 18, 2013, after the end of the team's 2012–13 season, the team's name was officially changed to the Pelicans.

Following the New Orleans franchise's 2013 abandonment of the "Hornets" name, on May 21, 2013, the Charlotte Bobcats' owner Michael Jordan officially announced the organization had submitted an application to change the name of his franchise to the Charlotte Hornets for the 2014–15 season pending majority approval by the NBA Board of Governors at a meeting in Las Vegas, on July 18, 2013. Then-NBA Deputy Commissioner and COO Adam Silver had previously pointed out that the league owns the rights to the name Hornets and that could speed up the process. The NBA unanimously approved the name change starting with 2014–15.

On June 27, 2013, during the 2013 NBA draft, the Pelicans selected Nerlens Noel 6th overall, and traded him along with a 2014 protected first-round pick for All-Star point guard Jrue Holiday of the Philadelphia 76ers and the 42nd pick, Pierre Jackson. During a press conference on May 20, 2014, announcing the Charlotte Bobcats' official team name change to Hornets, it was also announced that the Pelicans agreed to transfer the records and statistics of the original Hornets (1988–2002) to the current Charlotte franchise, thus unifying all of Charlotte's NBA basketball history under one franchise; the team records and statistics since the 2002 move to New Orleans would be retained by the Pelicans, retroactively turning the Pelicans into a 2002 expansion team. As a result, the Charlotte Hornets are considered in the league records as having suspended operations from 2002 to 2004, became the Bobcats from 2004 to 2014, and then the Hornets again.

==== 2015: Return to the playoffs ====
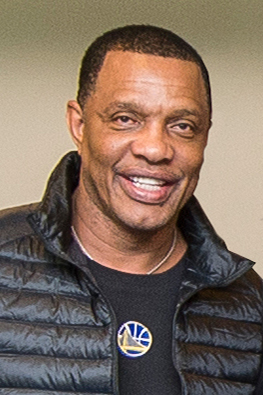
Alvin Gentry coached the team from 2015 to 2020.

During the 2014–15 season, for the first time under the name Pelicans, the team qualified for the NBA playoffs with a 45–37 record as the eighth seed in the Western Conference. They owned the tie-breaker over the Oklahoma City Thunder by winning the regular season head-to-head series, 3–1, and they faced the Golden State Warriors in the first round; the Warriors swept the Pelicans in four games. After the season, the Pelicans fired coach Monty Williams.

On May 31, 2015, the Pelicans hired Alvin Gentry as the franchise's sixth head coach. The Pelicans missed the 2016 NBA playoffs, finishing with a 30–52 record. They acquired the 6th pick in the 2016 NBA draft from the draft lottery and selected Buddy Hield from the University of Oklahoma.

==== 2017–2019: End of the Anthony Davis era ====
On February 20, 2017, the Pelicans acquired DeMarcus Cousins in a trade with the Sacramento Kings when they traded Buddy Hield, Tyreke Evans, Langston Galloway, a 2017 first-round pick, and a 2017 second-round pick in exchange for Cousins and Omri Casspi.

On February 1, 2018, the Pelicans acquired Nikola Mirotić in a trade with the Chicago Bulls. Though the trade went through, a previous trade for Mirotić to the Pelicans was called off when New Orleans did not want to pay for Mirotić's 2019 team option that Mirotić had signed with the Bulls during the off-season in 2017. The Pelicans received Mirotić and a 2018 second-round pick for veterans Ömer Aşık, Jameer Nelson, and Tony Allen. Mirotić demanded a trade when former teammate Bobby Portis punched Mirotić in the face during an off-season practice. At the time of the trade, Mirotić was the Bulls' leading scorer, and DeMarcus Cousins was injured. Mirotić played well for the Pelicans after the trade.

On March 15, 2018, Tom Benson died from complications of the flu. Ownership of the Pelicans and the Saints were transferred to Benson's widow, Gayle Benson.

The Pelicans clinched a playoff spot on April 9, 2018, and finished with a 48–34 record. In the first round of the playoffs, they swept the Portland Trail Blazers in four games before losing to the eventual champion Golden State Warriors four games to one.

In January 2019, Davis demanded a trade from the franchise, and was fined for publicly announcing the request. On May 14, 2019, the Pelicans received the first overall pick at the NBA draft lottery of the 2019 NBA draft, despite having a six percent chance to win it. On June 15, 2019, the Pelicans agreed to trade Davis to the Los Angeles Lakers. In return, the Lakers agreed to send Lonzo Ball, Brandon Ingram, Josh Hart and three first-round picks, including the fourth overall pick in the 2019 NBA draft, to the Pelicans. The Pelicans later agreed to trade draft rights of the fourth overall pick of the 2019 NBA draft to the Atlanta Hawks, receiving the draft rights to the eighth, 17th and 35th picks in the 2019 NBA draft. The three-way trade was completed on July 6, 2019, marking the end of an era for the Pelicans.

=== 2019–present: The Zion Williamson era ===
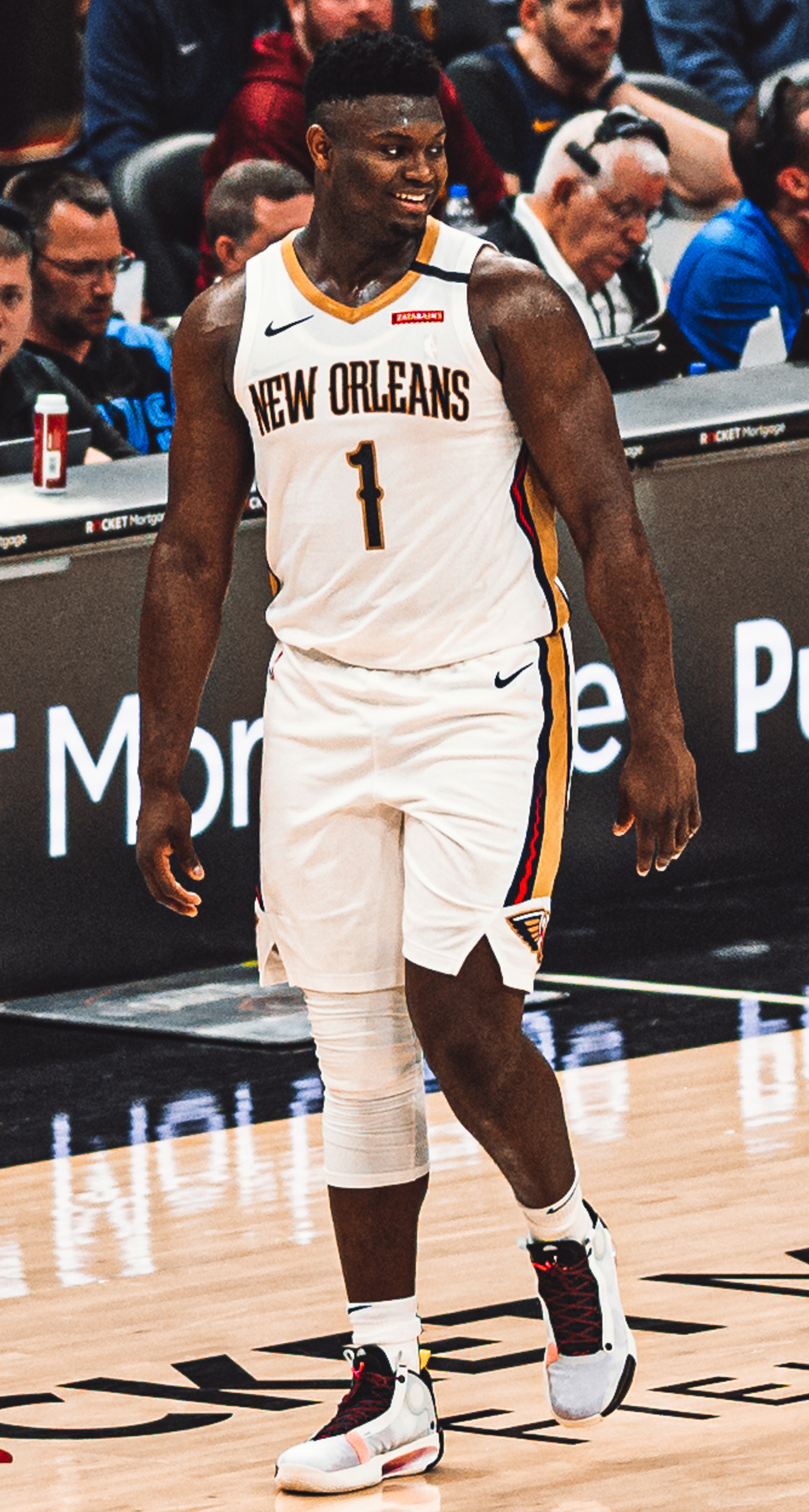
Zion Williamson

On April 17, 2019, the Pelicans named David Griffin as the new executive vice president of basketball operations. On May 19, 2019, the Pelicans named former Brooklyn Nets assistant general manager Trajan Langdon their new general manager, replacing interim general manager Danny Ferry.

On June 20, 2019, the Pelicans selected Zion Williamson with the first overall pick. The team also drafted Alen Smailagić and Jordan Bone, both of whom were immediately traded to the Golden State Warriors and Atlanta Hawks, respectively. The Pelicans then received Jaxson Hayes, Nickeil Alexander-Walker and Marcos Louzada Silva from the Hawks. On July 1, the Pelicans announced that they signed Williamson to his rookie-scale contract. However, the Pelicans began the 2019–20 season without Williamson as he had a knee surgery following an injury in the preseason. He made his debut on January 22, 2020, scoring 22 points in 18 minutes of play. On March 3, 2020, Williamson was named the NBA Rookie of the Month for the month of February. During the month, Williamson averaged 25.7 points, 6.2 rebounds, 2.6 assists, and 1.0 steal per game.

Brandon Ingram had a breakout season. On December 30, 2019, Ingram was named the Western Conference Player of the Week for games played from December 23 to 29. During the week, Ingram averaged 25.3 points, 7.3 rebounds, 4.5 assists, and 2.0 steals per game while shooting 49.3 percent from the field and 54.2 percent from three-point range. Ingram helped the Pelicans to a 4–0 week as a result. On January 16, 2020, Ingram scored a career-high 49 points in a 138–132 overtime win against the Utah Jazz. Ingram gave the Pelicans a one-point lead with a fadeaway jumper with 0.2 seconds remaining in regulation. This was before Rudy Gobert was fouled and subsequently sent the game into overtime with a free throw. Because of his breakout season, Ingram became an NBA All-Star for the first time in his career. Ingram also won the 2020 Most Improved Player award.

Following the suspension of the 2019–20 NBA season, the Pelicans were one of the 22 teams invited to the NBA Bubble to participate in the final eight games of the regular season. On August 9, 2020, the Pelicans were eliminated from postseason contention when the Portland Trail Blazers defeated the Philadelphia 76ers.

In a trade with the Portland Trail Blazers, the Pelicans landed 2015-16 Most Improved Player CJ McCollum as well as Larry Nance Jr. and Tony Snell in exchange for Josh Hart, Nickeil Alexander-Walker, Tomáš Satoranský, Didi Louzada, a protected 2022 first-round draft pick, the better of New Orleans' and Portland's 2026 second-round draft picks and New Orleans' 2027 second-round draft pick. Despite Williamson missing the entire season with a right foot fracture, the Pelicans finished the 2021–22 NBA season with a 36–46 record, which earned them the ninth-place position in the Western Conference and a chance to make the playoffs through the play-in tournament. On April 13, 2022, the Pelicans defeated the 10th-place San Antonio Spurs 113–103 at home in the first round of the play-in and two days later defeated the eighth-place Los Angeles Clippers 105–101 on the road in the second round of the play-in to clinch the eighth seed and New Orleans' first playoff berth since 2018.

The Pelicans selected Dyson Daniels with the 8th overall pick in the 2022 draft. Zion was selected for his second All-Star game despite only playing 29 games. Other Pelicans players would also dealt with injuries, but the team still made the play-in for the second time in a row but failed to advance to the playoffs.

For the first time since his second season, Zion Williamson stayed healthy for a majority of the regular season, playing 70 games. 2021 draft second-round pickup Herb Jones made the All-Defensive First Team as the fourth Pelican to do so. The Pelicans finished 49–33, just shy of 50 wins and advanced to the play-in for the third year in a row. Zion Williamson dropped 40 points and grabbed 11 rebounds in a loss to the Lakers. In that game, Zion got injured, ending his season. Despite not having Williamson, the Pelicans beat the Kings and advanced to the playoffs where they were swept by the Oklahoma City Thunder.

==== 2024–present: Acquisition of Dejounte Murray and departure of Brandon Ingram ====
In the 2024 off-season, a blockbuster trade sent 2022 All-Star Dejounte Murray to the Pelicans in exchange for 2022 lottery pick Dyson Daniels to the Atlanta Hawks along with Larry Nance Jr., E.J. Liddell, Cody Zeller and some future draft picks.

On February 6, 2025, Brandon Ingram was traded to the Toronto Raptors in exchange for guard-forward Bruce Brown, center Kelly Olynyk, a 2026 first-round draft pick (via Indiana) and a 2031 second-round draft pick. On March 10, the NBA and Australia's National Basketball League (NBL) announced that in October 2025, the Pelicans would play two preseason games at Rod Laver Arena in Melbourne as part of the NBA x NBL: Melbourne Series.

== Logos and uniforms ==
Originally, the New Orleans Hornets wore teal and white uniforms, with purple and gold added as trim colors. In 2004, they added a gold uniform to the rotation, and in 2006, this became the team's primary road uniform, while the teal uniform remained in use as an alternate. The 'fleur-de-bee' logo was added on the right chest in 2007. All three uniforms only featured the city name on the front.

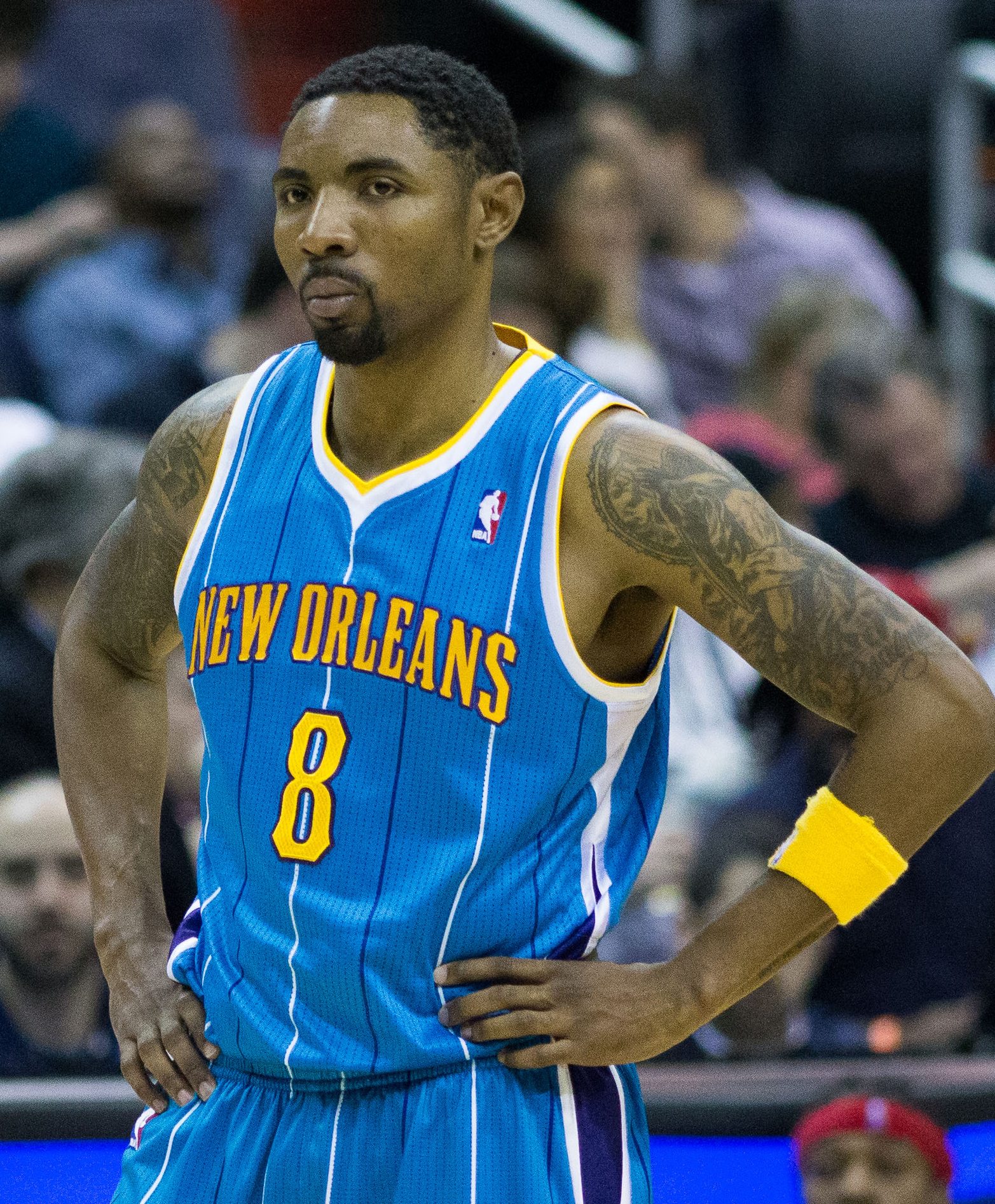
New Orleans Hornets primary uniform (2008–2013) featuring "creole blue"

During their two-year residency in Oklahoma City (2005–2007), the Hornets wore modified white uniforms with the team name in front. A teal hexagon patch with the acronym "OKC" inside adorned the right chest of their uniforms to represent their temporary home. They also wore a special white uniform with "Oklahoma City" surrounding the number, and a corresponding red uniform worn during Valentine's Day 2007. The red uniforms were auctioned for charity. Both uniforms replaced the "OKC" patch with the "NOLA" patch.

In 2008, the Hornets received new logos and uniforms, featuring lettering and numbers inspired by the wrought iron designs of the city. Teal was replaced with "creole blue", and pinstripes were added to the uniform. The following season, the Hornets began wearing a special uniform during Mardi Gras week; the design featured a purple front and a green back along with the "NOLA" wordmark in gold. Before the 2010–11 season, the Hornets brought back a gold alternate uniform, this time with pinstripes and the "NOLA" wordmark in front.

The New Orleans Hornets were sold to Tom Benson on April 13, 2012. After purchasing the team, Benson indicated that he wanted to change the club's nickname to something more regionally appropriate. On December 14, 2012, it was reported that the Hornets would change their nickname to the New Orleans Pelicans. On January 24, 2013, the team held a press conference, where it unveiled its new nickname, logos and colors. The name Pelicans is a reference to the brown pelican, the state bird of Louisiana. The team said in a press release that its colors would be navy, gold and red; each color is represented in the city flag of New Orleans. The team formally adopted its new brand identity at the end of the 2012–13 season.

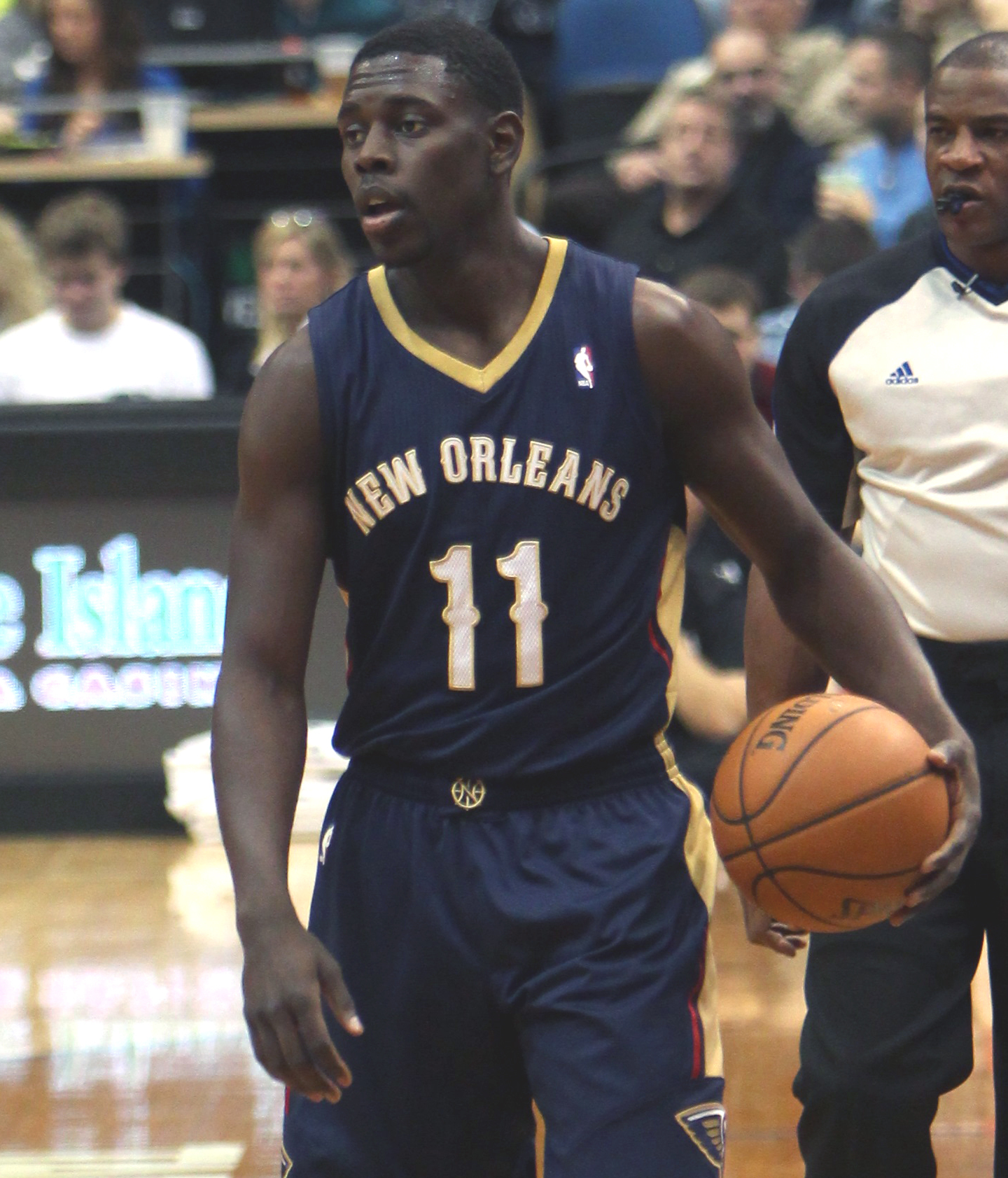
New Orleans Pelicans navy blue uniform (2013–2017)

On August 1, 2013, the Pelicans released their new uniforms. The 'New Orleans' wordmark logo across the front of the jerseys is inspired by French Quarter street signs; the Pelicans are one of three NBA teams to wear the city name across the front of both home and road jerseys. The partial logo is featured on the sides of the shorts, and the "Bird-de-Lis" logo (a combination mark of the pelican, fleur-de-lis and crescent basketball shape) is featured on the back neck. NBA teams were not allowed to have alternate uniforms during their first season of operation.

On September 23, 2014, the Pelicans unveiled a red alternate uniform for the 2014–15 season that would be worn four times in the year. Prior to the red alternate uniform unveiling, the NBA announced that its league logo would be moved to the back neck of game jerseys for all 30 clubs; as a result, the NBA league logo replaced the "Bird-de-Lis" logo on the back neck.

On September 17, 2015, the Pelicans unveiled a new alternate uniform, introduced as part of the NBA's "Pride" uniforms for the 2015–16 season. The short-sleeved uniforms feature Mardi Gras' signature colors – purple, green and gold. The tops are purple with green accents on the sleeves and sport 'NOLA' (a local acronym for New Orleans, Louisiana) across the chest in the Pelicans' signature font in gold letters trimmed in green. The Pelicans 'NO' logo is featured at the bottom of the v-neck and the Crescent City basketball logo is on the left sleeve in Mardi Gras colors. Additionally, the trim around the neckline is purple, green and gold-striped. Additionally, on the back of the jersey, the players' numbers will be gold with green trim, last name in white traditional lettering and the NBA logo will be featured at the base of the neck. The purple shorts will have green and gold stripes down the side with a small secondary logo – the "Bird-de-Lis" in gold centered on the waistband. The Pelicans' partial logo is on both sides of the shorts in Mardi Gras colors.

In 2017, the Pelicans received minor tweaks upon switching to Nike as the uniform supplier. The white "Association" and navy "Icon" uniforms now featured an enlarged and condensed treatment of the "New Orleans" wordmark, in a manner similar to the red "Statement" uniforms with the "Pelicans" wordmark. They also continued to wear their Mardi Gras-themed uniforms as part of the "City" edition series, which were updated annually. And during the 2018–19 season, the Pelicans wore an "Earned" edition uniform as a reward for qualifying in the 2018 playoffs. The uniforms switched the Mardi Gras colors for the Pelicans' existing palette.

For the 2020–21 season, the Pelicans' "City" uniform deviated from the Mardi Gras theme of previous years and was modeled after the New Orleans city flag.

The 2021–22 season saw a number of teams wear "City" uniforms featuring elements from past uniform designs; this was to commemorate the NBA's 75th anniversary. However, the Pelicans' "City" uniform for that season did not follow the aforementioned template, due to the fact that the team already sold the Hornets trademark to the Charlotte franchise back in 2014. Instead the team wore white "City" uniforms bearing the current color scheme and "NOLA" lettering shaped to resemble a bird in flight.

The Pelicans' 2022–23 "City" uniform brought back the Mardi Gras-inspired design they last wore in the 2018–19 season, but with a dark purple base.

Prior to the 2023–24 season, the Pelicans updated their red "Statement" uniform, now featuring the words "Crescent City" in white letters with navy blue trim surrounding navy blue numbers with white trim. The striping was also adjusted. Their "City" uniform for the season featured a black base with neon green letters, which were inspired by the vibrant night life of New Orleans. This uniform was reinstated during the 2025–26 season.

The "City" uniform used in the 2024–25 season mixed last season's uniform with the Mardi Gras-inspired look of the 2022–23 "City" uniform. The dark purple-based uniform featured "NOLA" in gold letters with neon green trim.

== Personnel ==
=== Current roster ===
New Orleans Pelicans roster
Players

Pos.	No.	Player	Height	Weight	DOB	From
G/F	41	Saddiq Bey	6 ft 8 in (2.03 m)	215 lb (98 kg)	1999-04-09	Villanova
G	4	Kobe Bufkin	6 ft 4 in (1.93 m)	195 lb (88 kg)	2003-09-21	Michigan
F	8	Malik Dia (TW)	6 ft 9 in (2.06 m)	250 lb (113 kg)	2004-02-04	Mississippi
G	0	Jeremiah Fears	6 ft 3 in (1.91 m)	190 lb (86 kg)	2006-10-14	Oklahoma
G	33	Caleb Houstan	6 ft 8 in (2.03 m)	205 lb (93 kg)	2003-01-09	Michigan
G	14	AJ Johnson	6 ft 5 in (1.96 m)	160 lb (73 kg)	2004-12-01
F	2	Herbert Jones	6 ft 7 in (2.01 m)	206 lb (93 kg)	1998-10-06	Alabama
C	6	DeAndre Jordan	6 ft 11 in (2.11 m)	265 lb (120 kg)	1988-07-21	Texas A&M
G/F	24	Bennedict Mathurin	6 ft 5 in (1.96 m)	210 lb (95 kg)	2002-06-19	Arizona
F/C	17	Karlo Matković	6 ft 10 in (2.08 m)	231 lb (105 kg)	2001-03-30	Croatia
G	11	Bryce McGowens	6 ft 6 in (1.98 m)	190 lb (86 kg)	2002-11-08	Nebraska
C	21	Yves Missi	6 ft 11 in (2.11 m)	235 lb (107 kg)	2004-05-14	Baylor
F	25	Trey Murphy III	6 ft 8 in (2.03 m)	206 lb (93 kg)	2000-06-18	Virginia
G	5	Dejounte Murray	6 ft 4 in (1.93 m)	180 lb (82 kg)	1996-09-19	Washington
G	10	Jaron Pierre Jr. (TW)	6 ft 5 in (1.96 m)	210 lb (95 kg)	2002-07-12	SMU
G	3	Jordan Poole	6 ft 4 in (1.93 m)	194 lb (88 kg)	1999-06-19	Michigan
C	22	Derik Queen	6 ft 9 in (2.06 m)	250 lb (113 kg)	2004-11-27	Maryland
PF	13	Julian Reese (TW)	6 ft 9 in (2.06 m)	230 lb (104 kg)	2003-06-30	Maryland
F	9	Trendon Watford	6 ft 8 in (2.03 m)	245 lb (111 kg)	2000-09-09	LSU
F	1	Zion Williamson	6 ft 6 in (1.98 m)	284 lb (129 kg)	2000-07-06	Duke

Coaches
Head coach
- Jamahl Mosley
Assistant(s)
- Bret Brielmaier
- Randy Gregory
- Jodie Meeks
- Dale Osbourne
- God Shammgod

Legend
- (DP) Unsigned draft pick
- (FA) Free agent
- (S) Suspended
- (GL) On assignment to G League
- (TW) Two-way affiliate player
- Injured

Roster
Updated: September 11, 2026

=== Retained draft rights ===
The Pelicans hold the draft rights to the following unsigned draft picks who have been playing outside the NBA. A drafted player, either an international draftee or a college draftee who is not signed by the team that drafted him, is allowed to sign with any non-NBA teams. In this case, the team retains the player's draft rights in the NBA until one year after the player's contract with the non-NBA team ends. This list includes draft rights that were acquired from trades with other teams.

Draft	Round	Pick	Player	Pos.	Nationality	Current team	Note(s)	Ref

=== Retired numbers ===
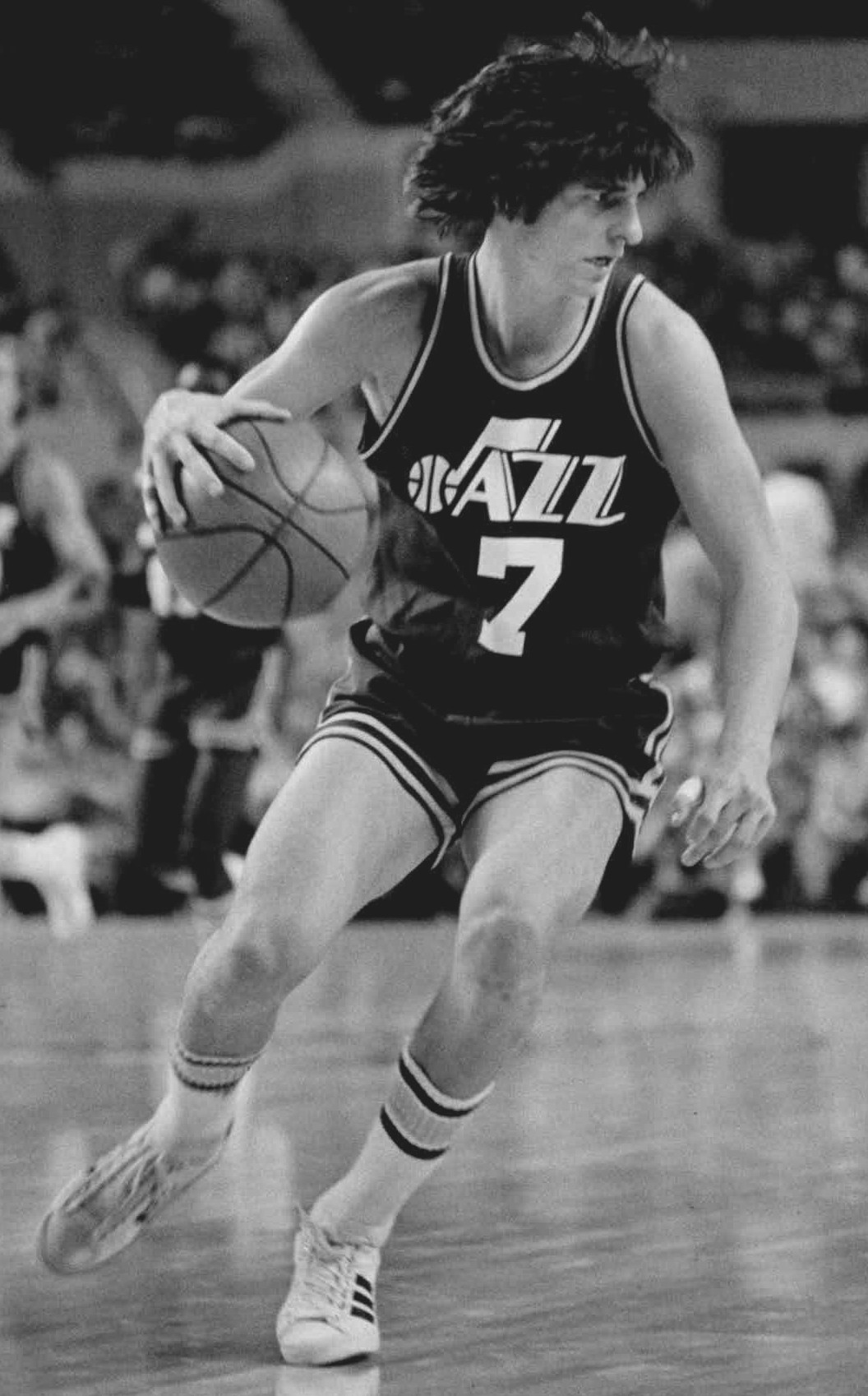
"Pistol Pete" Maravich's uniform No. 7 was retired.

New Orleans Pelicans retired numbers
No.	Player	Position	Tenure	Retired
7	Pete Maravich	G	1974–1979 ^{1}	October 30, 2002

Notes:

- ^{1} The New Orleans Hornets retired Maravich's number during their first game in New Orleans in honor of his basketball contributions to the state of Louisiana, both during his college career at Louisiana State University (LSU) and his professional career with the city's former NBA team, the New Orleans Jazz.
- From 2000 to 2014, the New Orleans Hornets had retired #13 in honor of Bobby Phills. The number was retired on February 9, 2000, after his death in an automobile accident in Charlotte. His jersey hung from the rafters of the Charlotte Coliseum until the franchise relocated in May 2002; it was then displayed in the New Orleans Arena until 2013. After the 1988–2002 history of the Hornets was transferred back to Charlotte, the Pelicans returned the number to circulation, while the new Hornets again had the number retired. In November 2014, Phills' jersey was returned from New Orleans to Charlotte, and it now hangs in the Spectrum Center. In the 2016–17 season, Cheick Diallo became the first Pelicans player to wear #13 after its reactivation.
- The NBA retired Bill Russell's No. 6 for all its member teams on August 11, 2022.

=== FIBA Hall of Famers ===
New Orleans Pelicans Hall of Famers
Players
No.	Name	Position	Tenure	Inducted
16	Peja Stojaković	F	2006–2010	2024

== Media ==
As of the 2024–25 season, Pelicans games not televised exclusively by the NBA's national television partners are carried by a network of Gray Media broadcast television stations in the Pelicans' television market, with the telecasts produced by Raycom Sports. The Pelicans' games are primarily carried by Gray's Gulf Coast Sports & Entertainment Network, and a subscription streaming service known as "Pelicans+" in partnership with Kiswe. The games are currently called by Joel Meyers on play-by-play, joined by former Pelicans player Antonio Daniels as an analyst. The network succeeded Bally Sports New Orleans, which dropped the team amid its parent company's bankruptcy.

== Season-by-season record ==
List of the last five seasons completed by the Pelicans. For the full season-by-season history, see List of New Orleans Pelicans seasons.

Note: GP = Games played, W = Wins, L = Losses, W–L% = Winning percentage

Season	GP	W	L	W–L%	Finish	Playoffs
2021–22	82	36	46	.439	3rd, Southwest	Lost in first round, 2–4 (Suns)
2022–23	82	42	40	.512	2nd, Southwest	Did not qualify
2023–24	82	49	33	.598	2nd, Southwest	Lost in first round, 0–4 (Thunder)
2024–25	82	21	61	.256	5th, Southwest	Did not qualify
2025–26	82	26	56	.317	5th, Southwest	Did not qualify

== Head coaches ==
Name	Tenure	Totals				Regular season				Playoffs			
Name	Tenure	G	W	L	PCT	G	W	L	PCT	G	W	L	PCT
Paul Silas	2002–2003	88	49	39	.557	82	47	35	.573	6	2	4	.333
Tim Floyd	2003–2004	89	44	45	.494	82	41	41	.500	7	3	4	.429
Byron Scott	2004–2009	436	211	225	.484	419	203	216	.484	17	8	9	.471
Jeff Bower	2009–2010	73	34	39	.466	73	34	39	.466	—	—	—	—
Monty Williams	2010–2015	404	175	229	.433	394	173	221	.439	10	2	8	.200
Alvin Gentry	2015–2020	337	150	187	.445	328	145	183	.442	9	5	4	.556
Stan Van Gundy	2020–2021	72	31	41	.431	72	31	41	.431	—	—	—	—
Willie Green	2021–2025	350	152	198	.434	340	150	190	.441	10	2	8	.200
James Borrego	2026	70	24	46	.343	70	24	46	.343	—	—	—	—
Jamahl Mosley	2026–present	0	0	0	–	0	0	0	–	0	0	0	–

== Home arenas ==
- Smoothie King Center (2002–present), formerly known as New Orleans Arena (2002–2014)
- One other temporary facility due to the effects of Hurricane Katrina:
  - Ford Center (2005–2007)

== Mascot ==
Pierre the Pelican is the official mascot for the Pelicans. He was introduced on October 30, 2013, the opening night of regular season for the team at home against the Indiana Pacers. The name for the mascot was selected by the fans through an online poll on the team's website. However, Pierre's unconventional design frightened some fans. The mascot's redesigned head was released on February 11, 2014.

The Pelicans' prior mascot was Hugo the Hornet, who was part of the organization from 2002 to 2013. Hugo returned as the mascot for the Charlotte Hornets starting with the 2014–15 season.

== Sponsorship and partnerships ==
Since 2014, the Pelicans have played in the Smoothie King Center, following a 10-year naming rights agreement with the smoothie and supplement chain headquartered in nearby Metairie, Louisiana. In 2023, the team added NewAge Products as their official jersey patch sponsor. Over the years, the franchise has also partnered with brands such as Zatarain’s, Entergy, Chevron, and Hancock Whitney Bank across media, community initiatives, and in-arena sponsorship activations.
