= Nola (disambiguation) =

Nola is a town and municipality in Italy; and NOLA is an acronym for New Orleans, Louisiana, a city in the United States.

Nola or NOLA may also refer to:

== Places ==
- Nola, Central African Republic, a city in Sangha-Mbaéré
- Nola, Arkansas, United States, an unincorporated community
- Roman Catholic Diocese of Nola, Italy
- NOLA Motorsports Park, a road race track in Avondale, Louisiana

== People ==
- Nola (name), a list of people (and a rhinoceros) with the given name or surname

=== Fictional characters ===
- Nola Darling, the central character in the film She's Gotta Have It
- Nola Rice, main character in the film Match Point

== Battles ==
- Battle of Nola (disambiguation)
- Battle of Nola (Second Punic War): -- Battle of Nola (216 BC), Battle of Nola (215 BC), Battle of Nola (214 BC), all inconclusive attempts by Hannibal to seize the town of Nola during the Second Punic War

== Arts and entertainment ==
- WNOL-TV, a CW affiliate for New Orleans known on air as NOLA 38
- Nola (film), a 2003 film starring Emmy Rossum

=== Music ===
- Nola (music group), a Croatian rock band
- NOLA (album), the debut album from sludge metal act Down
- "Nola", a 1915 novelty piano solo composed by Felix Arndt
- "NOLA", a 2025 song by Kevin Abstract from Blush

== Biology ==
- Nola (rhinoceros), a female northern white rhinoceros at the San Diego Zoo
- Nola (moth), the namesake genus of the moth family Nolidae

== Other uses ==
- The open source predecessor to the accounting software NolaPro
