= Philip Smithells =

New Zealand physical educationalist (1910–1977)

Philip Ashton Smithells (12 April 1910 – 13 January 1977) was a New Zealand physical educationalist and university professor.

He was born in Leeds, Yorkshire, England in 1910, the son of the British chemist Arthur Smithells. He received his education at Bedales School and at Clare College of the University of Cambridge. He became a lecturer in physical education at the University of Otago.

Smithells along with Rona Bailey and wife Olive Smithells founded the New Dance Group in Wellington in 1945. The dance style was described by Marianne Shultz as "modern, political and expressive". In 1949, he was inducted as a Corresponding Fellow in the National Academy of Kinesiology, USA (formerly American Academy of Physical Education; American Academy of Kinesiology and Physical Education).

He lived in Wanganui during his retirement, where he died on 13 January 1977. He was survived by his second wife, Olive Smithells, his two daughters from his first marriage, and his three sons from his second marriage.
