= D. D. Raphael =

British philosopher

David Daiches Raphael (25 January 1916 – 22 December 2015) was a British philosopher.

== Academic career ==
He taught at the University of Otago, Dunedin, in New Zealand from 1946 to 1949, before returning to the United Kingdom as a lecturer in moral philosophy at the University of Glasgow and rising to become Edward Caird Professor of Political and Social Philosophy between 1960 and 1970. After a period as Professor of Philosophy at the University of Reading (1970–1973), he was Professor of Philosophy at Imperial College, University of London from 1973 until he retired in 1983.

He is known for his writings on Adam Smith, Thomas Hobbes, justice, the rights of man, and his 1981, introductory philosophical book; Moral Philosophy.

== Selected works ==
- Raphael, D. Daiches (1947). The Moral Sense. London: Oxford University Press – via Internet Archive.
- Raphael, D. Daiches (1955). Moral Judgment. London: George Allen & Unwin Ltd. – via Internet Archive.
- Raphael, D. Daiches (1958). "Darwinism and Ethics". In Barnett, Samuel Antony (ed.). A Century of Darwin. Free Port, New York: Books for Libraries Press. pp. 334– 359. ISBN 978-0-8369-1019-3 – via Internet Archive.
- Raphael, D. D. (1975). "The Impartial Spectator". In Skinner, A.; Wilson, T. (eds.). Essays on Adam Smith. Oxford: Clarendon Press. pp. 83– 99. ISBN 978-0-19-828191-7 – via Internet Archive.
- Smith, Adam (1976). Raphael, D. D.; Macfie, Alec Lawrence (eds.). The Theory of Moral Sentiments. Oxford: Oxford University Press – via Internet Archive.
- Raphael, D. D. (1980). Justice and Liberty. London: The Athlone Press. ISBN 978-0-485-11195-8 – via Internet Archive.
- Raphael, D. D. (1981). Moral Philosophy. Oxford and New York: Oxford University Press. ISBN 978-0-19-289136-5 – via Internet Archive.
- Smith, Adam (1982). Meek, R. L.; Raphael. D. D.; Stein, P. G. (eds.). Lectures on Jurisprudence. Indianapolis: Liberty Fund. ISBN 978-0-86597-011-3 – via Internet Archive.
- Raphael, D. D. (1985). Adam Smith. London and New York: Oxford University Press – via Internet Archive.
- Raphael, D. D. (1990). Problems of Political Philosophy (2nd ed.). Macmillan – via Internet Archive.
- Raphael, D. D. (1997). "Adam Smith". Three Great Economists: Smith, Malthus, Keynes. Oxford, New York: Oxford University Press. pp. 1– 104. ISBN 978-0-19-287694-2 – via Internet Archive.
- Raphael, D. D. (2001). Concepts of Justice. Oxford: Clarendon Press – via Internet Archive .
- Raphael, D. D. (2007). The Impartial Spectator: The Moral Philosophy of Adam Smith. Oxford University Press: Oxford University Press Press – via Internet Archive.
