= Karlo Matković =

Croatian basketball player (born 2001)

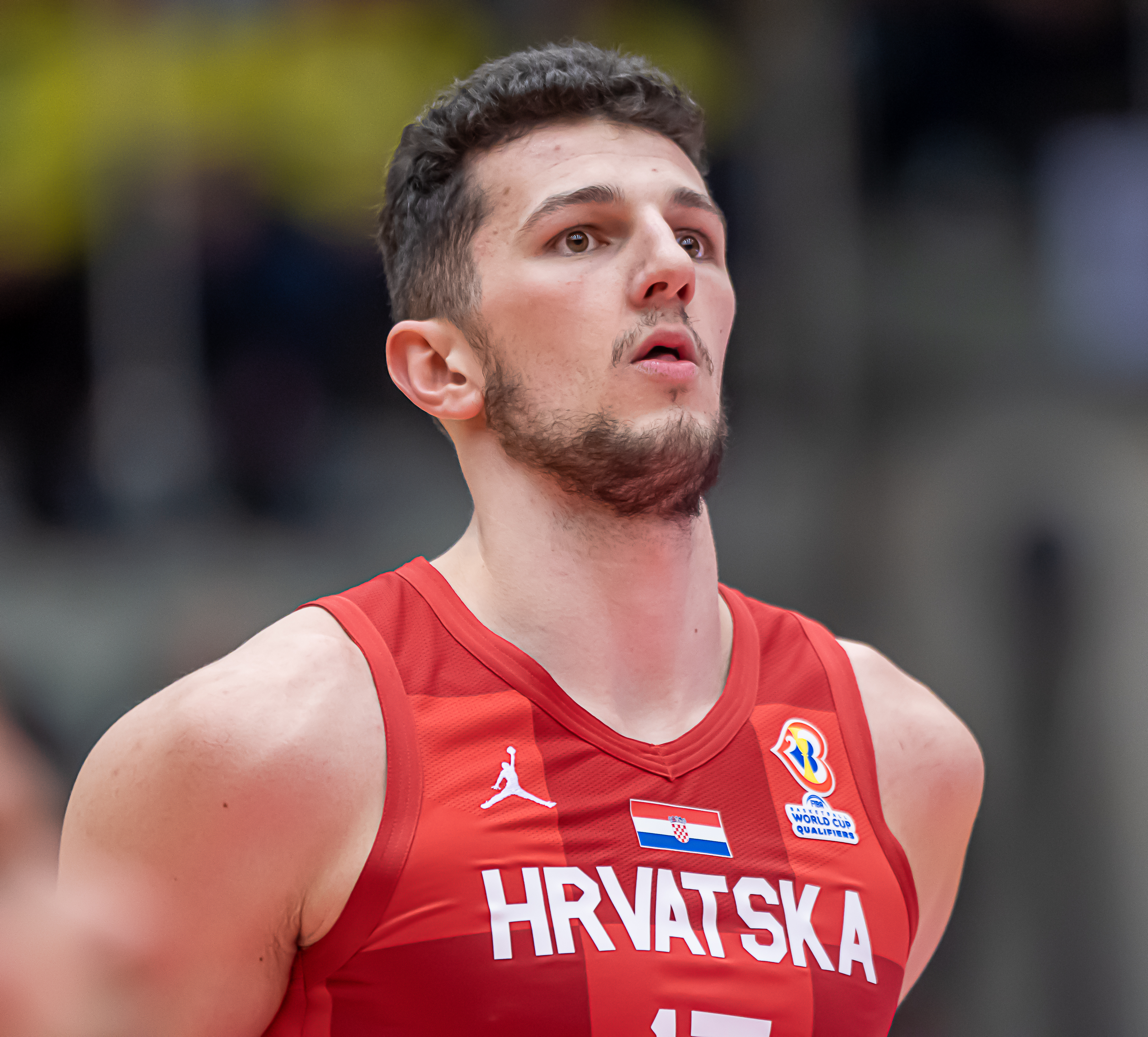
- Matković with the Croatia national team in 2022

No. 17 – New Orleans Pelicans
- Position: Center / power forward
- League: NBA

Personal information
- Born: 30 March 2001 (age 25) Livno, Bosnia and Herzegovina
- Listed height: 6 ft 11 in (2.11 m)
- Listed weight: 255 lb (116 kg)

Career information
- NBA draft: 2022: 2nd round, 52nd overall pick
- Drafted by: New Orleans Pelicans
- Playing career: 2018–present

Career history
- 2018–2019: Cedevita
- 2019–2024: Cedevita Olimpija
- 2019–2020: →OKK Beograd
- 2020–2022: →Mega
- 2024: Birmingham Squadron
- 2024–present: New Orleans Pelicans
- 2024–2025: →Birmingham Squadron

Career highlights
- EuroCup blocks leader (2024); ABA League blocks leader (2024); Slovenian League champion (2023); Slovenian Cup winner (2023); Croatian Cup winner (2019); Jordan Brand Classic (2017)
- Stats at NBA.com
- Stats at Basketball Reference

Karlo Matković (born 30 March 2001) is a Croatian professional basketball player for the New Orleans Pelicans of the National Basketball Association (NBA). He represents the Croatia national team internationally.

== Early career ==
In 2017, Matković participated in the Jordan Brand Classic camp. In August 2018, he participated at the Basketball Without Borders Europe camp in Belgrade, Serbia, representing Bosnia and Herzegovina.

== Professional career ==
=== Europe (2018–2024) ===
During the 2018–19 Croatian League season, Matković was promoted to the Cedevita senior team. In April 2019, he signed his first professional contract for Cedevita. In September 2019, he was loaned to OKK Beograd for the 2019–20 Serbian League season. In August 2020, he was loaned to Mega Soccerbet for the 2020–21 ABA season. Following the 2020–21 season, Matković declared for the 2021 NBA draft, but withdrew his name from consideration on July 19, 2021.

After declaring for the 2022 NBA draft in April 2022, Matković was selected with the 52nd overall pick by the New Orleans Pelicans and joined them for the 2022 NBA Summer League. However, he didn't join the Pelicans for the 2022–23 NBA season and on 23 July, he joined Cedevita Olimpija.

On 4 February 2024, Matković left Cedevita Olimpija.

=== New Orleans Pelicans / Birmingham Squadron (2024–present) ===
On 22 February 2024, Matković joined the Birmingham Squadron of the NBA G League and on 14 July, he signed with the New Orleans Pelicans. He made his NBA debut on 23 October, in a 123–111 win over the Chicago Bulls. Throughout his debut season, he has been assigned several times to Birmingham.

== National team career ==
=== Bosnia and Herzegovina ===
Matković was born to a Croat family in Bosnia and Herzegovina. He was a member of the Bosnia and Herzegovina under-18 team at the 2018 FIBA U18 European Championship in Latvia. Over seven tournament games, he averaged 8.6 points, 6.3 rebounds and 2.1 assists per game. His team finished the last at the tournament with a 0–7 record.

=== Croatia ===
In November 2021, Matković expressed his interest to represent Croatia internationally in the senior competitions, if called. He made his debut for Croatia in February 2022, in the 2023 FIBA World Cup Qualifiers match against Sweden.

== Career statistics ==
Legend
GP	Games played	GS	Games started	MPG	Minutes per game
FG%	Field goal percentage	3P%	3-point field goal percentage	FT%	Free throw percentage
RPG	Rebounds per game	APG	Assists per game	SPG	Steals per game
BPG	Blocks per game	PPG	Points per game	**Bold**	Career high

=== NBA ===
Year	Team	GP	GS	MPG	FG%	3P%	FT%	RPG	APG	SPG	BPG	PPG
2024–25	New Orleans	42	**7**	**18.8**	.574	.318	**.773**	**5.0**	**1.1**	**.5**	**1.0**	**7.7**
2025–26	New Orleans	**62**	2	14.7	**.604**	**.422**	.732	3.7	.8	.4	.9	5.7
Career		104	9	16.4	.589	.378	.753	4.2	.9	.5	.9	6.5

== See also ==
- List of Croatian NBA players
