= Olive Smithells =

New Zealand dancer and health instructor (1920–2007)

- Born: Olive Frances Whitta; 24 October 1920; Christchurch, New Zealand
- Died: 7 June 2007 (aged 86); Dunedin, New Zealand
- Occupations: Dancer, physical education instructor, health educator
- Spouse: Philip Smithells (m. 1944; died 1977)
- Relatives: Arthur Smithells (father-in-law)

Olive Frances Smithells (née Whitta; 24 October 1920 – 7 June 2007) was a New Zealand dancer and health instructor.

== Early life ==
Olive Frances Whitta was born in Christchurch on 24 October 1920, the daughter of Stephen V. Whitta and Margaret Ewing Whitta. Her father was born in Cornwall. She was active as a Girl Guide and trained as a physical education teacher at Christchurch Teachers' College from 1938 to 1940.

== Career ==
Smithells was a lecturer in health and physical education at Wellington Teachers' College and Dunedin Teachers' College, and later at the University of Otago. She edited the Bulletin of the New Zealand Physical Education Society, which became the Journal of Physical Education New Zealand. She wrote two books, Fatness, Figures and Fitness (1967) and an exercise guide, Look After Your Back, Streamline Your Front (1970, illustrated by Els Noordhof), and co-authored another, Individual needs in physical education (1974, with Philip Smithells).

Smithells was a member of the Wellington New Dance Group from 1945 and 1948, performing along with her husband Philip Smithells, Rona Bailey, and Edith Sipos. Their dance works included Hiroshima (1947), Monotony Chorus, The Dance of Two Women, and Sabotage in a Factory. Shirley Horrocks directed a documentary film about the group, Dance of the Instant: The New Dance Group, 1945–1947 (2009).

== Personal life ==
Olive Whitta married English-born physical education professor Philip Ashton Smithells in 1944, five days after his first marriage ended in divorce. They had three sons. Both Smithellses were practising Quakers and active in the cause of pacifism. Philip was a founder of the University of Otago's School of Physical Education, and the university's Smithells Gymnasium is named in his honour. Olive Smithells was widowed when Philip died in 1977, and she died in Dunedin on 7 June 2007, aged 86 years.
