= Nola (name) =

Nola is both a surname and a given name. Notable people with the name include:

== Surname ==
- Aaron Nola (born 1993), American baseball player
- Austin Nola (born 1989), American baseball player
- Giovanni da Nola (1478–1559), Italian Renaissance sculptor and architect
- Giovanni Domenico da Nola (c. 1510 to 1520-1592), Italian Renaissance composer and poet
- Lukas Nola (born 1964), Croatian film director
- Pavlina Nola (born 1974), retired tennis player
- R'Bonney Nola (born 1994), Filipino-American beauty pageant titleholder, model, and fashion designer. Winner of Miss USA 2022 and Miss Universe 2022

== Given name ==
- Nola Anderson, Australian museum professional, academic, and arts writer
- Nola Barber (1901–1985), first woman mayor of Chelsea City, Australia
- Nola Barron (born 1931), New Zealand potter
- Nola Bond, New Zealand sprinter
- Nola Blake (born c. 1952), Australian woman sentenced to death in Thailand for drug trafficking; sentence later commuted
- Nola Chilton (1922-2021), Israeli theater director and acting teacher
- Nola Fairbanks (born 1924), American actress
- Nola Fraser, Australian nurse and whistleblower
- Nola Haynes (1897-1996), American mathematician
- Nola Henry (born 1994), American basketball coach
- Nola Hylton (born 1957), American oncologist
- Nola Ishmael (born 1943), Barbadian nurse
- Nola Luxford (1895-1994), American actress
- Nola Marino (born 1954), member of the Australian Parliament
- Nola Matthews (born 2006), American artistic gymnast
- Nola Millar (1913-1974), New Zealand librarian, theatre director, critic and administrator
- Nola Nahulu (born 1954), American choral conductor
- Nola Ochs (1911-2016)), American oldest college graduate
- Nola Pender (born 1941), American nursing theorist, author, and academic
- Nola Rae (born 1950), Australian mime artist
- Nola Randall-Mohk, Australian teacher and advocate
- Nola Thorne (born c. 1919), Panamanian track and field athlete

== Other ==
- Nola (rhinoceros), a female rhinoceros at the San Diego Zoo

== See also ==
- Nela (name)
