= Studies in the Labour Theory of Value =

1956 book by Ronald L. Meek

- Cover of the first US edition
- Author: Ronald L. Meek
- Language: English
- Subject: Labor theory of value
- Publisher: Lawrence & Wishart (UK); Monthly Review Press (US)
- Publication date: 1956
- Media type: Print (Hardcover and Paperback)
- Pages: 372

Studies in the Labour Theory of Value (1956; second edition 1973) is a book about the labor theory of value by the economist Ronald L. Meek.
