= Peter Stein (legal scholar) =

British legal scholar (1926–2016)

Peter Gonville Stein QC FBA
- Born: 29 May 1926; Liverpool, England
- Died: 7 August 2016 (aged 90); Cambridge, England
- Spouses: Janet Chamberlain (m. 1953, divorced) Anne Howard (m. 1978)
- Children: 3 daughters plus 1 step-son
- Parent(s): Walter O. Stein (father); Effie D. Walker (mother)
- Occupations: legal scholar; educator
- Employer(s): University of Nottingham; University of Pavia; University of Aberdeen; University of Cambridge

Academic background
- Education: Liverpool College; Gonville and Gaius College, Cambridge

Peter Gonville Stein (29 May 1926 – 7 August 2016) was a British legal scholar.

He was Professor of Jurisprudence at the University of Aberdeen from 1956 to 1968 and Regius Professor of Civil Law at the University of Cambridge from 1968 until his retirement in 1993.

== Biography ==
Peter Stein was educated at Liverpool College and later studied at Gonville and Caius College, Cambridge, where he obtained his BA in 1949. He obtained his LLB in Cambridge as an external in 1950, and became a solicitor in 1951. He completed a scholarship at the University of Pavia before becoming an Assistant Lecturer in Law in the University of Nottingham, in 1952. He then moved to the University of Aberdeen, where he obtained his PhD under the supervision of David Daube. He was Lecturer (1953–56) and then Professor (1956-1968) in Jurisprudence at the University of Aberdeen.

Back to Cambridge, Stein was Regius Professor of Civil Law and Fellow of Queens' College, Cambridge between 1968 and 1993. He remained Emeritus Professor of Civil Law and Life Fellow of Queens' College until his death in 2016.

== Honours ==
In 1974, Stein was elected Fellow of the British Academy (FBA). On 20 April 1993, he was appointed an honorary Queen's Counsel (QC). He was also President of the Academy of the European Private Lawyers - Accademia dei Giusprivatisti Europei (Pavia).

== Selected works ==
- Stein, Peter (1958). Fault in the formation of contract in Roman law and Scots law. Edinburgh and London: Oliver and Boyd – via Internet Archive.
- Buckland, William Warwick (1963). revised by Stein, Peter (ed.). A Textbook of Roman law from Augustus to Justinian (3rd ed.). Cambridge: Cambridge University Press. ISBN 9780521043601.
- Stein, Peter (1966). Regulae Juris: from juristic rules to legal maxims. Edinburgh: Edinburgh University Press.
- Stein, Peter; Shand, John (1974). Legal values in western society. Edinburgh: Edinburgh University Press. ISBN 0852242573.
- Stein, Peter (1980). Legal Evolution: The Story of an Idea. Cambridge: Cambridge University Press. ISBN 0521108004.
- Smith, Adam (1982). Meek, R. L.; Raphael. D. D.; Stein, P. G. (eds.). Lectures on Jurisprudence. Indianapolis: Liberty Fund – via Internet Archive.
- Stein, Peter (1984). Legal Institutions: The Development of Dispute Settlement. London: Butterworths. ISBN 0406400261.
- Stein, Peter (1988). The character and influence of the Roman civil law: historical essays. London and Ronceverte: Hambledon Press.
- Stein, Peter (1999). Roman law in European history. Cambridge, UK: Cambridge University Press. ISBN 0-511-03674-4.
