= Els Noordhof =

Dutch-born portrait artist and book illustrator

- Born: Elisabeth Johanna Noordhof; 24 February 1924; Bloemendaal, Holland
- Died: 7 March 2013 (aged 89); Otago, New Zealand
- Occupations: Illustrator, artist

Elisabeth Johanna Noordhof (24 February 1924 – 7 March 2013), known as Els Noordhof or Els Noordhof-Smith, was a Dutch-born portrait artist and book illustrator.

== Early life ==
Elisabeth Johanna Noordhof was born in 1924 in Bloemendaal, Holland, the daughter of Gosse Eilke Noordhof. She earned a Master of Fine Arts degree from the Rijksmuseum in 1945. Her older brother George H. Noordhof became a filmmaker in England.

== Career ==
Noordhof lived in England and the United States after World War II. She and her family settled in New Zealand in 1966. She had a studio in Dunedin, and taught at the University of Otago's summer arts schools in Kurow. She painted the official portraits of several mayors of Dunedin, though mayor Sukhi Turner was not fond of her Noordhof portrait, and replaced it with a photograph in the city council chambers. She was a patron of the Otago Art Society.

== Books illustrated by Els Noordhof ==
- Ruth Dallas, Ragamuffin Scarecrow (1969)
- Olive Smithells, Look After Your Back, Streamline Your Front (1970)
- Esther Glen, Six Little New Zealanders (1983)
- Esther Glen, Uncles Three at Kamahi (1985)

== Personal life and legacy ==
In 1949, while she was living in Cambridge, Noordhof married an American Fulbright scholar, Harold "Hal" Wendell Smith. They had four children. She was widowed when Smith died in 2006, and she died in 2013, aged 89 years. The National Library of New Zealand holds audio recordings of a 2002 oral history interview with Noordhof, conducted by Penelope Dunkley.

Her work was included in a 2017 exhibit, "About Face: Selected Portraits from the Collection", at the Eastern Southland Gallery.
