= Arthur Smithells =

British chemist (1860–1939)

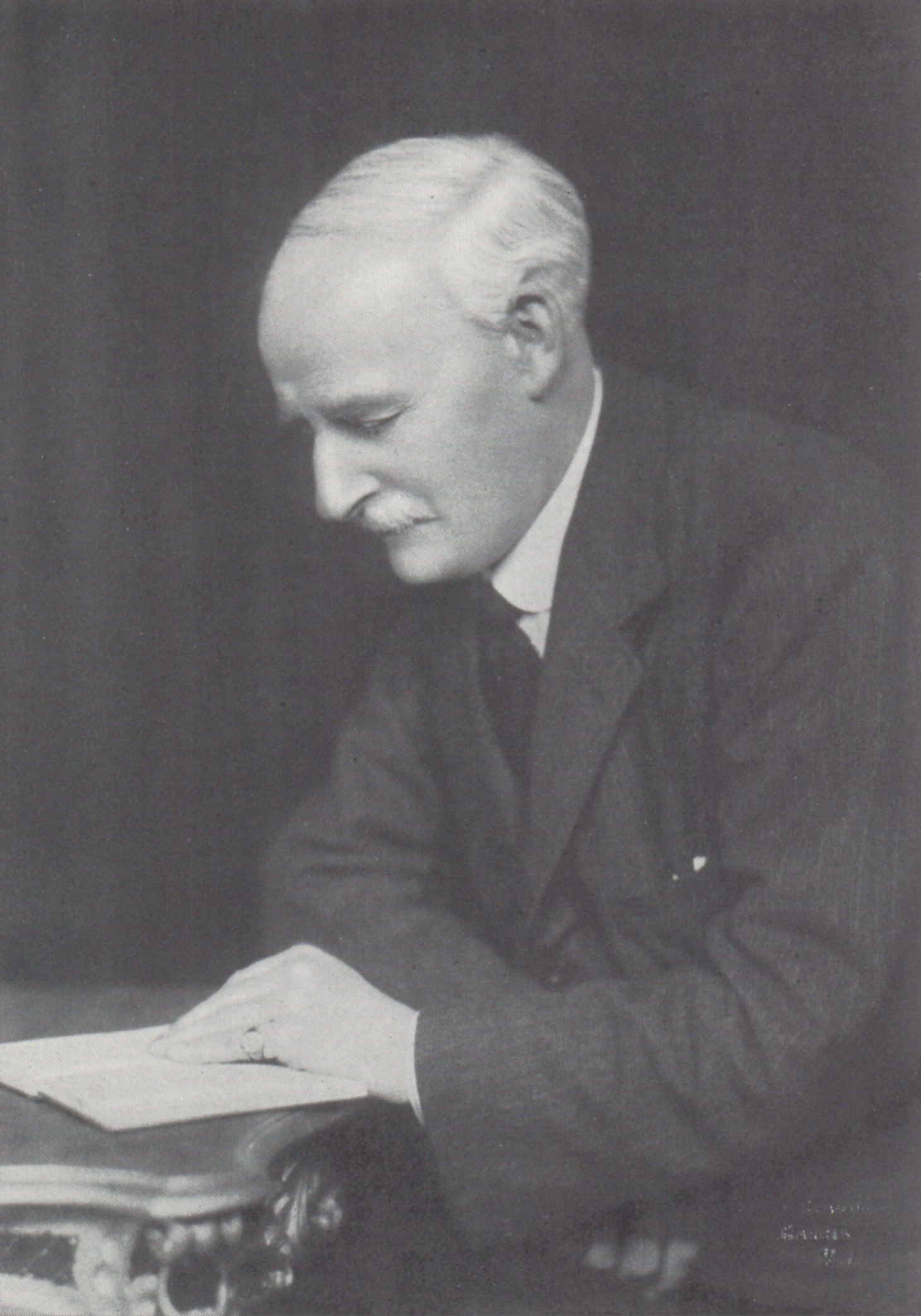
- Born: 24 May 1860; Bury, England
- Died: 8 February 1939 (aged 78); London, England
- Children: Philip Ashton Smithells
- Awards: Companion of the Order of St Michael and St George (1918)

Arthur Smithells, CMG FRS (24 May 1860 – 24 February 1939) was a British chemist.

== Early life and education ==
Smithells was born in Bury, Lancashire on 24 May 1860. His father James Smithells was a railway manager. He was educated at the University of Glasgow and then spent time under Roscoe and Schorlemmer at Owens College, Manchester. He gained his BSc from the University of London, then took supplemental courses in Munich and with Robert Bunsen at Heidelberg University.

== Academic career ==
In 1883 Smithells was appointed assistant lecturer at Owens College and on 8 January 1884 was elected to membership of the Manchester Literary and Philosophical Society. Two years later he succeeded Professor Sir Edward Thorpe as professor of chemistry at the Yorkshire College, Leeds, which became the University of Leeds in 1904. Smithells went on to be pro-vice-chancellor at Leeds, a post he held until he retired from his chair as emeritus professor in 1923.

During his career Smithells was honorary educational adviser on home science and household economics to King's College London (appointed 1907), president of the Society of British Gas Industries (1911).

In 1923 he became director of the Salters’ Institute of Industrial Chemistry, a role that involved assessing applications for grants; he remained a director until 1937.

His research was predominantly focused on flames, the process of burning and flame spectroscopy

== Honours ==
During the First World War, Smithells was an adviser to the Northern Command, becoming Lieutenant-Colonel-Chief Chemical Adviser (Anti-gas Training) (1916–1919), for which in 1918 he was appointed a Companion of the Order of St Michael and St George (CMG).

As well as being a Fellow of the Royal Society (elected 1901, becoming vice-president in 1916), he was also a Fellow of the Institute of Chemistry (elected 1887) serving on the council and holding the posts of vice-president from 1915 to 1917, 1923-1926 and 1930-1933 and President (1927–1930), and was made an Honorary Fellow of the Society for Analytical Chemistry (elected 1927).

== Family ==
His son, Philip Ashton Smithells, was a physical educationalist and university professor at the University of Otago in New Zealand.

== Death ==
Smithells died on 24 February 1939, aged 78.
