= Flag of New Orleans =

City of New Orleans
- Use: Other
- Proportion: 2:3
- Adopted: January 5, 1918
- Design: Three yellow fleurs-de-lis on white field atop blue stripe and underneath red stripe, with the white field five times the width of the stripes.
- Designed by: Bernard Barry and Gustave Couret

The flag of New Orleans contains a large white field that contains three gold fleurs-de-lis and is bordered on the top by a red stripe and from below by a blue stripe. The presence of the fleur-de-lis, a stylized depiction of a flower and a traditional French symbol, demonstrates the city's French heritage and strong ties to France, while the presence of the design being a Spanish fess demonstrates the city's Spanish heritage and strong ties to Spain.

== History ==
The City of New Orleans adopted its official flag in January 1918, having selected its design from nearly 400 ideas submitted to its Citizen's Flag Committee in preparation for the city's bicentennial celebration. The red, white, and blue flag emblazoned with gold fleurs-de-lis combined one proposal's suggested color scheme with decorative elements from another. The patriotic color scheme was suggested by Bernard Barry, then employed as an engraver at A. B. Griswold and Co., jewelers, and the fleurs-de-lis idea is attributed to Gustave Couret, a draftsman with the Diboll, Owen, and Goldstein architectural firm. The official flag of the City of New Orleans was named by the city council in January 1918.

== Symbolism ==
The white field is the symbol of justice and the government, the blue stripe represents liberty, and the red stripe represents fraternity. In addition these are also the colors of the flag of France. The white field is five times the width of the stripes making it a Spanish fess mirroring the design of the flag of Spain. The three fleur-de-lis grouped in triangular form represent New Orleans under the principles of government, liberty, and fraternity.
