= NBA Rookie of the Month Award =

Basketball award

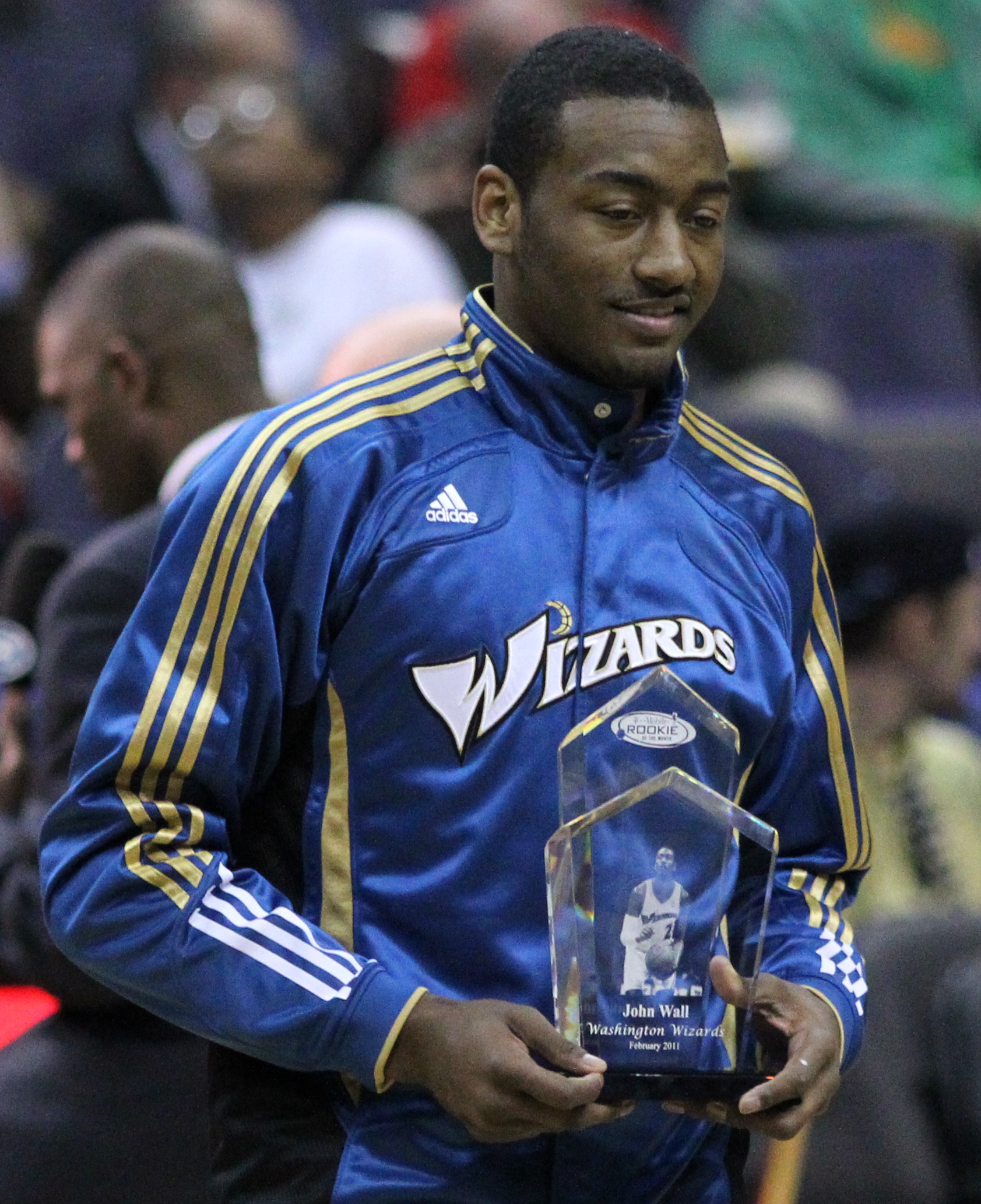
John Wall receiving the February 2011 Rookie of the Month Award

The T-Mobile National Basketball Association Rookie of the Month Award is presented monthly by the league to honor the top rookie in both conferences (Eastern and Western conferences) in a particular month. Once won, the trophy is presented to the player before his next home game. David Robinson, Tim Duncan, LeBron James, Carmelo Anthony, Chris Paul, Blake Griffin, Damian Lillard and Karl-Anthony Towns are the only 6-time winners of the award.

== Winners ==
**Player** (in bold text)	Indicates the player who won the Rookie of the Year award
Player (in italic text)	Indicates the player who was drafted first overall

=== 1981–2001 ===
Year	Month	Player(s)	Team(s)
1981–82
1981–82	November	Mark Aguirre; Isiah Thomas	Dallas Mavericks; Detroit Pistons
1981–82	December	Kelly Tripucka; Jay Vincent	Detroit Pistons; Dallas Mavericks
1981–82	January	Tom Chambers; Jeff Ruland	San Diego Clippers; Washington Bullets
1981–82	February	Jay Vincent (2); **Buck Williams**	Dallas Mavericks; New Jersey Nets
1981–82	March	Kelly Tripucka (2); Jay Vincent (3)	Detroit Pistons; Dallas Mavericks
1982–83
1982–83	November	**Terry Cummings**	San Diego Clippers
1982–83	December	Clark Kellogg	Indiana Pacers
1982–83	January	**Terry Cummings** (2)	San Diego Clippers
1982–83	February	**Terry Cummings** (3)	San Diego Clippers
1982–83	March	**Terry Cummings** (4)	San Diego Clippers
1983–84
1983–84	November	**Ralph Sampson**	Houston Rockets
1983–84	December	**Ralph Sampson** (2)	Houston Rockets
1983–84	January	**Ralph Sampson** (3)	Houston Rockets
1983–84	February	**Ralph Sampson** (4)	Houston Rockets
1983–84	March	**Ralph Sampson** (5)	Houston Rockets
1984–85
1984–85	November	**Michael Jordan**	Chicago Bulls
1984–85	December	Hakeem Olajuwon	Houston Rockets
1984–85	January	**Michael Jordan** (2)	Chicago Bulls
1984–85	February	Hakeem Olajuwon (2)	Houston Rockets
1984–85	March	**Michael Jordan** (3); Hakeem Olajuwon (3)	Chicago Bulls; Houston Rockets
1985–86
1985–86	November	**Patrick Ewing**	New York Knicks
1985–86	December	Karl Malone	Utah Jazz
1985–86	January	**Patrick Ewing** (2)	New York Knicks
1985–86	February	Charles Oakley	Chicago Bulls
1985–86	March	Benoit Benjamin	Los Angeles Clippers
1986–87
1986–87	November	**Chuck Person**	Indiana Pacers
1986–87	December	Ron Harper	Cleveland Cavaliers
1986–87	January	Ron Harper (2)	Cleveland Cavaliers
1986–87	February	**Chuck Person** (2)	Indiana Pacers
1986–87	March	Brad Daugherty	Cleveland Cavaliers
1987–88
1987–88	November	**Mark Jackson**	New York Knicks
1987–88	December	**Mark Jackson** (2)	New York Knicks
1987–88	January	Armen Gilliam	Phoenix Suns
1987–88	February	**Mark Jackson** (3)	New York Knicks
1987–88	March	Cadillac Anderson	San Antonio Spurs
1987–88	April	Kevin Johnson	Phoenix Suns
1988–89
1988–89	November	Willie Anderson	San Antonio Spurs
1988–89	December	**Mitch Richmond**	Golden State Warriors
1988–89	January	**Mitch Richmond** (2)	Golden State Warriors
1988–89	February	Charles Smith	Los Angeles Clippers
1988–89	March	**Mitch Richmond** (3)	Golden State Warriors
1988–89	April	Charles Smith (2)	Los Angeles Clippers
1989–90
1989–90	November	**David Robinson**	San Antonio Spurs
1989–90	December	**David Robinson** (2)	San Antonio Spurs
1989–90	January	**David Robinson** (3)	San Antonio Spurs
1989–90	February	**David Robinson** (4)	San Antonio Spurs
1989–90	March	**David Robinson** (5)	San Antonio Spurs
1989–90	April	**David Robinson** (6)	San Antonio Spurs
1990–91
1990–91	November	**Derrick Coleman**	New Jersey Nets
1990–91	December	Lionel Simmons	Sacramento Kings
1990–91	January	**Derrick Coleman** (2)	New Jersey Nets
1990–91	February	Lionel Simmons (2)	Sacramento Kings
1990–91	March	Dennis Scott	Orlando Magic
1990–91	April	**Derrick Coleman** (3)	New Jersey Nets
1991–92
1991–92	November	Dikembe Mutombo	Denver Nuggets
1991–92	December	**Larry Johnson**	Charlotte Hornets
1991–92	January	Dikembe Mutombo (2)	Denver Nuggets
1991–92	February	**Larry Johnson** (2)	Charlotte Hornets
1991–92	March	**Larry Johnson** (3)	Charlotte Hornets
1991–92	April	Stacey Augmon	Atlanta Hawks
1992–93
1992–93	November	**Shaquille O'Neal**	Orlando Magic
1992–93	December	**Shaquille O'Neal** (2)	Orlando Magic
1992–93	January	**Shaquille O'Neal** (3)	Orlando Magic
1992–93	February	**Shaquille O'Neal** (4)	Orlando Magic
1992–93	March	Alonzo Mourning	Charlotte Hornets
1992–93	April	Alonzo Mourning (2)	Charlotte Hornets
1993–94
1993–94	November	Dino Rađa	Boston Celtics
1993–94	December	**Chris Webber**	Golden State Warriors
1993–94	January	Penny Hardaway	Orlando Magic
1993–94	February	Vin Baker	Milwaukee Bucks
1993–94	March	**Chris Webber** (2)	Golden State Warriors
1993–94	April	Penny Hardaway (2)	Orlando Magic
1994–95
1994–95	November	**Grant Hill**	Detroit Pistons
1994–95	December	Glenn Robinson	Milwaukee Bucks
1994–95	January	Brian Grant	Sacramento Kings
1994–95	February	Juwan Howard	Washington Bullets
1994–95	March	**Jason Kidd**	Dallas Mavericks
1994–95	April	Glenn Robinson (2)	Milwaukee Bucks
1995–96
1995–96	November	**Damon Stoudamire**	Toronto Raptors
1995–96	December	Joe Smith	Golden State Warriors
1995–96	January	**Damon Stoudamire** (2)	Toronto Raptors
1995–96	February	Joe Smith (2)	Golden State Warriors
1995–96	March	Jerry Stackhouse	Philadelphia 76ers
1995–96	April	Arvydas Sabonis	Portland Trail Blazers
1996–97
1996–97	November	**Allen Iverson**	Philadelphia 76ers
1996–97	December	Shareef Abdur-Rahim; Kerry Kittles	Vancouver Grizzlies; New Jersey Nets
1996–97	January	Stephon Marbury	Minnesota Timberwolves
1996–97	February	Shareef Abdur-Rahim (2)	Vancouver Grizzlies
1996–97	March	Marcus Camby	Toronto Raptors
1996–97	April	**Allen Iverson** (2)	Philadelphia 76ers
1997–98
1997–98	November	**Tim Duncan**	San Antonio Spurs
1997–98	December	**Tim Duncan** (2)	San Antonio Spurs
1997–98	January	**Tim Duncan** (3)	San Antonio Spurs
1997–98	February	**Tim Duncan** (4)	San Antonio Spurs
1997–98	March	**Tim Duncan** (5)	San Antonio Spurs
1997–98	April	**Tim Duncan** (6)	San Antonio Spurs
1998–99^{[a]}
1998–99^{[a]}	February	Paul Pierce	Boston Celtics
1998–99^{[a]}	March	**Vince Carter**	Toronto Raptors
1998–99^{[a]}	April	**Vince Carter** (2)	Toronto Raptors
1999–00
1999–00	November	Adrian Griffin; Lamar Odom	Boston Celtics; Los Angeles Clippers
1999–00	December	**Steve Francis**	Houston Rockets
1999–00	January	**Elton Brand**	Chicago Bulls
1999–00	February	**Elton Brand** (2)	Chicago Bulls
1999–00	March	**Steve Francis** (2)	Houston Rockets
1999–00	April	**Elton Brand** (3); **Steve Francis** (3)	Chicago Bulls; Houston Rockets
2000–01
2000–01	November	Kenyon Martin	New Jersey Nets
2000–01	December	Marc Jackson	Golden State Warriors
2000–01	January	Marc Jackson (2)	Golden State Warriors
2000–01	February	**Mike Miller**	Orlando Magic
2000–01	March	Kenyon Martin (2); **Mike Miller** (2)	New Jersey Nets; Orlando Magic
2000–01	April	Courtney Alexander^{[b]}	Washington Wizards

=== 2001–present ===
Year	Month	Player(s)	Team(s)	Player(s)	Team(s)
Year	Month	Eastern Conference		Western Conference	
2001–02
2001–02	November	Jamaal Tinsley	Indiana Pacers	**Pau Gasol**	Memphis Grizzlies
2001–02	December	Brendan Haywood	Washington Wizards	Shane Battier	Memphis Grizzlies
2001–02	January	Richard Jefferson	New Jersey Nets	**Pau Gasol** (2)	Memphis Grizzlies
2001–02	February	Trenton Hassell	Chicago Bulls	Jason Richardson	Golden State Warriors
2001–02	March	Jamaal Tinsley (2)	Indiana Pacers	**Pau Gasol** (3)	Memphis Grizzlies
2001–02	April	Željko Rebrača	Detroit Pistons	Gilbert Arenas	Golden State Warriors
2002–03
2002–03	November	Caron Butler	Miami Heat	Drew Gooden^{[c]}	Memphis Grizzlies
2002–03	December	Jay Williams	Chicago Bulls	Yao Ming	Houston Rockets
2002–03	January	Caron Butler (2)	Miami Heat	**Amar'e Stoudemire**	Phoenix Suns
2002–03	February	Caron Butler (3)	Miami Heat	Yao Ming (2)	Houston Rockets
2002–03	March	Caron Butler (4)	Miami Heat	Manu Ginóbili	San Antonio Spurs
2002–03	April	Carlos Boozer	Cleveland Cavaliers	**Amar'e Stoudemire** (2)	Phoenix Suns
2003–04
2003–04	November	**LeBron James**	Cleveland Cavaliers	Carmelo Anthony	Denver Nuggets
2003–04	December	**LeBron James** (2)	Cleveland Cavaliers	Carmelo Anthony (2)	Denver Nuggets
2003–04	January	**LeBron James** (3)	Cleveland Cavaliers	Carmelo Anthony (3)	Denver Nuggets
2003–04	February	**LeBron James** (4)	Cleveland Cavaliers	Carmelo Anthony (4)	Denver Nuggets
2003–04	March	**LeBron James** (5)	Cleveland Cavaliers	Carmelo Anthony (5)	Denver Nuggets
2003–04	April	**LeBron James** (6)	Cleveland Cavaliers	Carmelo Anthony (6)	Denver Nuggets
2004–05
2004–05	November	**Emeka Okafor**	Charlotte Bobcats	Devin Harris	Dallas Mavericks
2004–05	December	**Emeka Okafor** (2)	Charlotte Bobcats	Beno Udrih	San Antonio Spurs
2004–05	January	Ben Gordon	Chicago Bulls	J. R. Smith	New Orleans Hornets
2004–05	February	Ben Gordon (2)	Chicago Bulls	J. R. Smith (2)	New Orleans Hornets
2004–05	March	Ben Gordon (3)	Chicago Bulls	J. R. Smith (3)	New Orleans Hornets
2004–05	April	**Emeka Okafor** (3)	Charlotte Bobcats	Shaun Livingston	Los Angeles Clippers
2005–06
2005–06	November	Channing Frye	New York Knicks	**Chris Paul**	New Orleans/Oklahoma City Hornets
2005–06	December	Charlie Villanueva	Toronto Raptors	**Chris Paul** (2)	New Orleans/Oklahoma City Hornets
2005–06	January	Andrew Bogut	Milwaukee Bucks	**Chris Paul** (3)	New Orleans/Oklahoma City Hornets
2005–06	February	Raymond Felton	Charlotte Bobcats	**Chris Paul** (4)	New Orleans/Oklahoma City Hornets
2005–06	March	Raymond Felton (2)	Charlotte Bobcats	**Chris Paul** (5)	New Orleans/Oklahoma City Hornets
2005–06	April	Raymond Felton (3)	Charlotte Bobcats	**Chris Paul** (6)	New Orleans/Oklahoma City Hornets
2006–07
2006–07	November	Adam Morrison	Charlotte Bobcats	Rudy Gay	Memphis Grizzlies
2006–07	December	Jorge Garbajosa	Toronto Raptors	Randy Foye	Minnesota Timberwolves
2006–07	January	Andrea Bargnani	Toronto Raptors	**Brandon Roy**	Portland Trail Blazers
2006–07	February	Andrea Bargnani (2)	Toronto Raptors	**Brandon Roy** (2)	Portland Trail Blazers
2006–07	March	Wálter Herrmann	Charlotte Bobcats	**Brandon Roy** (3)	Portland Trail Blazers
2006–07	April	Shelden Williams	Atlanta Hawks	Tarence Kinsey	Memphis Grizzlies
2007–08
2007–08	November	Al Horford	Atlanta Hawks	**Kevin Durant**	Seattle SuperSonics
2007–08	December	Yi Jianlian	Milwaukee Bucks	**Kevin Durant** (2)	Seattle SuperSonics
2007–08	January	Jamario Moon	Toronto Raptors	**Kevin Durant** (3)	Seattle SuperSonics
2007–08	February	Al Horford (2)	Atlanta Hawks	Luis Scola	Houston Rockets
2007–08	March	Al Horford (3)	Atlanta Hawks	**Kevin Durant** (4)	Seattle SuperSonics
2007–08	April	Ramon Sessions	Milwaukee Bucks	**Kevin Durant** (5)	Seattle SuperSonics
2008–09
2008–09	November	**Derrick Rose**	Chicago Bulls	O. J. Mayo	Memphis Grizzlies
2008–09	December	**Derrick Rose** (2)	Chicago Bulls	Russell Westbrook	Oklahoma City Thunder
2008–09	January	Brook Lopez	New Jersey Nets	Eric Gordon	Los Angeles Clippers
2008–09	February	Brook Lopez (2)	New Jersey Nets	Russell Westbrook (2)	Oklahoma City Thunder
2008–09	March	**Derrick Rose** (3)	Chicago Bulls	Kevin Love	Minnesota Timberwolves
2008–09	April	Michael Beasley	Miami Heat	O. J. Mayo (2)	Memphis Grizzlies
2009–10
2009–10	November	Brandon Jennings	Milwaukee Bucks	**Tyreke Evans**	Sacramento Kings
2009–10	December	Brandon Jennings (2)	Milwaukee Bucks	**Tyreke Evans** (2)	Sacramento Kings
2009–10	January	Brandon Jennings (3)	Milwaukee Bucks	Stephen Curry	Golden State Warriors
2009–10	February	Jonas Jerebko	Detroit Pistons	Darren Collison	New Orleans Hornets
2009–10	March	Brandon Jennings (4)	Milwaukee Bucks	Stephen Curry (2)	Golden State Warriors
2009–10	April	Terrence Williams	New Jersey Nets	Stephen Curry (3)	Golden State Warriors
2010–11
2010–11	November	Landry Fields	New York Knicks	**Blake Griffin**	Los Angeles Clippers
2010–11	December	Landry Fields (2)	New York Knicks	**Blake Griffin** (2)	Los Angeles Clippers
2010–11	January	John Wall	Washington Wizards	**Blake Griffin** (3)	Los Angeles Clippers
2010–11	February	John Wall (2)	Washington Wizards	**Blake Griffin** (4)	Los Angeles Clippers
2010–11	March	John Wall (3)	Washington Wizards	**Blake Griffin** (5)	Los Angeles Clippers
2010–11	April	John Wall (4)	Washington Wizards	**Blake Griffin** (6)	Los Angeles Clippers
2011–12
2011–12	December	**Kyrie Irving**	Cleveland Cavaliers	Ricky Rubio	Minnesota Timberwolves
2011–12	January	**Kyrie Irving** (2)	Cleveland Cavaliers	Ricky Rubio (2)	Minnesota Timberwolves
2011–12	February	**Kyrie Irving** (3)	Cleveland Cavaliers	Isaiah Thomas	Sacramento Kings
2011–12	March	**Kyrie Irving** (4)	Cleveland Cavaliers	Isaiah Thomas (2)	Sacramento Kings
2011–12	April	Ivan Johnson	Atlanta Hawks	Kenneth Faried	Denver Nuggets
2012–13
2012–13	November	Michael Kidd-Gilchrist	Charlotte Bobcats	**Damian Lillard**	Portland Trail Blazers
2012–13	December	Bradley Beal	Washington Wizards	**Damian Lillard** (2)	Portland Trail Blazers
2012–13	January	Bradley Beal (2)	Washington Wizards	**Damian Lillard** (3)	Portland Trail Blazers
2012–13	February	Dion Waiters	Cleveland Cavaliers	**Damian Lillard** (4)	Portland Trail Blazers
2012–13	March	Jonas Valančiūnas	Toronto Raptors	**Damian Lillard** (5)	Portland Trail Blazers
2012–13	April	Chris Copeland	New York Knicks	**Damian Lillard** (6)	Portland Trail Blazers
2013–14
2013–14	November	**Michael Carter-Williams**	Philadelphia 76ers	Ben McLemore	Sacramento Kings
2013–14	December	Victor Oladipo	Orlando Magic	Trey Burke	Utah Jazz
2013–14	January	**Michael Carter-Williams** (2)	Philadelphia 76ers	Trey Burke (2)	Utah Jazz
2013–14	February	Victor Oladipo (2)	Orlando Magic	Nick Calathes	Memphis Grizzlies
2013–14	March	**Michael Carter-Williams** (3)	Philadelphia 76ers	Gorgui Dieng	Minnesota Timberwolves
2013–14	April	**Michael Carter-Williams** (4)	Philadelphia 76ers	Trey Burke (3)	Utah Jazz
2014–15
2014–15	November	Jabari Parker	Milwaukee Bucks	**Andrew Wiggins**	Minnesota Timberwolves
2014–15	December	Nikola Mirotić	Chicago Bulls	**Andrew Wiggins** (2)	Minnesota Timberwolves
2014–15	January	Elfrid Payton	Orlando Magic	**Andrew Wiggins** (3)	Minnesota Timberwolves
2014–15	February	Marcus Smart	Boston Celtics	**Andrew Wiggins** (4)	Minnesota Timberwolves
2014–15	March	Nikola Mirotić (2)	Chicago Bulls	Jordan Clarkson	Los Angeles Lakers
2014–15	April	Bojan Bogdanović	Brooklyn Nets	Rodney Hood	Utah Jazz
2015–16
2015–16	November	Kristaps Porziņģis	New York Knicks	**Karl-Anthony Towns**	Minnesota Timberwolves
2015–16	December	Kristaps Porziņģis (2)	New York Knicks	**Karl-Anthony Towns** (2)	Minnesota Timberwolves
2015–16	January	Kristaps Porziņģis (3)	New York Knicks	**Karl-Anthony Towns** (3)	Minnesota Timberwolves
2015–16	February	Myles Turner	Indiana Pacers	**Karl-Anthony Towns** (4)	Minnesota Timberwolves
2015–16	March	Josh Richardson	Miami Heat	**Karl-Anthony Towns** (5)	Minnesota Timberwolves
2015–16	April	Norman Powell	Toronto Raptors	**Karl-Anthony Towns** (6)	Minnesota Timberwolves
2016–17
2016–17	November	Joel Embiid	Philadelphia 76ers	Jamal Murray	Denver Nuggets
2016–17	December	Joel Embiid (2)	Philadelphia 76ers	Buddy Hield	New Orleans Pelicans
2016–17	January	Joel Embiid (3)	Philadelphia 76ers	Marquese Chriss	Phoenix Suns
2016–17	February	Dario Šarić	Philadelphia 76ers	Yogi Ferrell	Dallas Mavericks
2016–17	March	Dario Šarić (2)	Philadelphia 76ers	Buddy Hield (2)	Sacramento Kings
2016–17	April	Willy Hernangómez	New York Knicks	Tyler Ulis	Phoenix Suns
2017–18
2017–18	November	**Ben Simmons**	Philadelphia 76ers	Kyle Kuzma	Los Angeles Lakers
2017–18	December	Jayson Tatum	Boston Celtics	Donovan Mitchell	Utah Jazz
2017–18	January	**Ben Simmons** (2)	Philadelphia 76ers	Donovan Mitchell (2)	Utah Jazz
2017–18	February	**Ben Simmons** (3)	Philadelphia 76ers	Donovan Mitchell (3)	Utah Jazz
2017–18	March	**Ben Simmons** (4)	Philadelphia 76ers	Donovan Mitchell (4)	Utah Jazz
2018–19
2018–19	November	Trae Young	Atlanta Hawks	**Luka Dončić**	Dallas Mavericks
2018–19	December	Kevin Knox II	New York Knicks	**Luka Dončić** (2)	Dallas Mavericks
2018–19	January	Trae Young (2)	Atlanta Hawks	**Luka Dončić** (3)	Dallas Mavericks
2018–19	February	Trae Young (3)	Atlanta Hawks	**Luka Dončić** (4)	Dallas Mavericks
2018–19	March	Trae Young (4)	Atlanta Hawks	**Luka Dončić** (5)	Dallas Mavericks
2019–20
2019–20	November	Kendrick Nunn	Miami Heat	**Ja Morant**	Memphis Grizzlies
2019–20	December	Kendrick Nunn (2)	Miami Heat	**Ja Morant** (2)	Memphis Grizzlies
2019–20	January	Kendrick Nunn (3)	Miami Heat	**Ja Morant** (3)	Memphis Grizzlies
2019–20	February	Coby White	Chicago Bulls	Zion Williamson	New Orleans Pelicans
2020–21	December/January	**LaMelo Ball**	Charlotte Hornets	Tyrese Haliburton	Sacramento Kings
2020–21	February	**LaMelo Ball** (2)	Charlotte Hornets	Tyrese Haliburton (2)	Sacramento Kings
2020–21	March	**LaMelo Ball** (3)	Charlotte Hornets	Anthony Edwards	Minnesota Timberwolves
2020–21	April	Malachi Flynn	Toronto Raptors	Anthony Edwards (2)	Minnesota Timberwolves
2020–21	May	R. J. Hampton	Orlando Magic	Anthony Edwards (3)	Minnesota Timberwolves
2021–22	November	Evan Mobley	Cleveland Cavaliers	Josh Giddey	Oklahoma City Thunder
2021–22	December	Franz Wagner	Orlando Magic	Josh Giddey (2)	Oklahoma City Thunder
2021–22	January	Cade Cunningham	Detroit Pistons	Josh Giddey (3)	Oklahoma City Thunder
2021–22	February	**Scottie Barnes**	Toronto Raptors	Josh Giddey (4)	Oklahoma City Thunder
2021–22	March	**Scottie Barnes** (2)	Toronto Raptors	Jalen Green	Houston Rockets
2022–23	November	Bennedict Mathurin	Indiana Pacers	Jalen Williams	Oklahoma City Thunder
2022–23	December	**Paolo Banchero**	Orlando Magic	Keegan Murray	Sacramento Kings
2022–23	January	**Paolo Banchero** (2)	Orlando Magic	Keegan Murray (2)	Sacramento Kings
2022–23	February	**Paolo Banchero** (3)	Orlando Magic	Walker Kessler	Utah Jazz
2022–23	March	**Paolo Banchero** (4)	Orlando Magic	Jalen Williams (2)	Oklahoma City Thunder
2023–24	November	Jaime Jaquez Jr.	Miami Heat	Chet Holmgren	Oklahoma City Thunder
2023–24	December	Jaime Jaquez Jr. (2)	Miami Heat	Chet Holmgren (2)	Oklahoma City Thunder
2023–24	January	Brandon Miller	Charlotte Hornets	**Victor Wembanyama**	San Antonio Spurs
2023–24	February	Brandon Miller (2)	Charlotte Hornets	**Victor Wembanyama** (2)	San Antonio Spurs
2023–24	March	Brandon Miller (3)	Charlotte Hornets	**Victor Wembanyama** (3)	San Antonio Spurs
2024–25	November	Jared McCain	Philadelphia 76ers	Jaylen Wells	Memphis Grizzlies
2024–25	December	Alex Sarr	Washington Wizards	Yves Missi	New Orleans Pelicans
2024–25	January	Kel'el Ware	Miami Heat	**Stephon Castle**	San Antonio Spurs
2024–25	February	Zaccharie Risacher	Atlanta Hawks	Isaiah Collier	Utah Jazz
2024–25	March	Zaccharie Risacher (2)	Atlanta Hawks	**Stephon Castle** (2)	San Antonio Spurs
2025–26	November	Kon Knueppel	Charlotte Hornets	**Cooper Flagg**	Dallas Mavericks
2025–26	December	Kon Knueppel (2)	Charlotte Hornets	**Cooper Flagg (2)**	Dallas Mavericks
2025–26	January	Kon Knueppel (3)	Charlotte Hornets	**Cooper Flagg (3)**	Dallas Mavericks
2025–26	February	Kon Knueppel (4)	Charlotte Hornets	Dylan Harper	San Antonio Spurs
2025–26	March	V. J. Edgecombe	Philadelphia 76ers	Maxime Raynaud	Sacramento Kings

== See also ==
- NBA Rookie of the Year Award
- NBA All-Rookie Team
