= Chip Bailey =

New Zealand communist, taxi driver and trade unionist

Reginald John "Chip" Bailey (16 March 1921 – –25 April 1963) was a New Zealand communist, taxi driver and trade unionist.

Bailey was born in Blenheim, Marlborough, on 16 March 1921 to James and Elizabeth (née Murray).

His family moved to Wellington early in Bailey's life, and he attended Khandallah School and Wellington College. After leaving school Bailey worked in numerous jobs. He joined the Communist Party of New Zealand (CPNZ) and also became involved in working for the Unity Theatre. On 15 June 1945, Chip Bailey married Rona Meek in Wellington. They had one child, a daughter, in 1949.

Bailey joined the Royal New Zealand Air Force in May 1942, but was unable to serve overseas due to chronic chest weakness (the result of childhood pneumonia), and was discharged the following year. After this he worked as a taxi driver while continuing to advocate for workers' rights, being elected to the executive council of the Wellington Drivers’ Union in 1949. He was instrumental in reorganising the union, and was elected vice president in 1954, later becoming secretary from 1956 to 1958. As an influential workers' leader, he was elected to the management committee of the Wellington Trades Council.

In early 1963, Bailey a brain tumour, and as a result he died in Dunedin Public Hospital on 25 April, aged 42. He was cremated, with his ashes being scattered.
