= Nola Millar =

New Zealand librarian and theatre director

Nola Leigh Millar (18 February 1913 – 20 January 1974) was a New Zealand librarian, theatre director, critic and administrator. She was born in Wellington, New Zealand, on 18 February 1913. She established drama training in New Zealand in 1970 and became the first director of what is now Toi Whakaari: New Zealand Drama School, and was also founder and director of Unity Theatre, Wellington.

== Recognition and achievements ==
Millar directed a New Zealand play called The Trap by Kate Ross that was entered into the British Drama League Festival by Unity Theatre in 1951, and was described as 'the best play in the festival'.

Millar established New Zealand's national drama school, Toi Whakaari: New Zealand Drama School, in 1970, the official title then was the Queen Elizabeth II Arts Council New Zealand Drama School. Their library is named the Nola Millar Library after her as their first director.

In 1973 the Arts Council made Millar an award for her achievements in New Zealand theatre. They said "As one of the founders of Unity Theatre she was instrumental in adding to the conventions of orthodox repertory a concept of theatre with a social conscious."

New Zealand playwright Roger Hall states Millar's role in establishing professional theatre in New Zealand:

Millar's career mirrors that of New Zealand theatre in recent times, that is, progressing from a largely amateur basis to the establishment and survival of the professional groups, starting with Downstage and Mercury and others. It was thanks to her (and others) that this became possible ...
