= Unity Theatre, Wellington =

New Zealand theatre company

Unity Theatre was a theatre company in Wellington, New Zealand, founded in 1942 that ran until around 1979. It pre-dated professional theatre in New Zealand, which started in the mid 1960s and 1970s.

Different to other theatre societies in the 1940s, Unity's objective was to bring social, moral and political issues to audiences. The early committee was led from 1942 until 1949 by Robert Stead, he was a member of the Communist Party and a carpenter and he also had worked with the London Unity Theatre before he came to New Zealand in 1939.

One notable member of Unity Theatre was Nola Millar, who opened up the focus of the company beyond politics.

Over the years Unity Theatre had an ongoing search to have a suitable location for their plays to be staged, and presented works at many places in Wellington, including the building 1 Kent Terrace, which is now home to BATS Theatre. Many of the company members from Unity were part of forming both Downstage Theatre and Circa Theatre in the mid-1970s and earlier also part of the beginning of the Toi Whakaari: The New Zealand Drama School (called the Queen Elizabeth II Arts Council New Zealand Drama Training School when it started in 1970).
