= Bill Sheat =

New Zealand lawyer and arts advocate (1930–2021)

Bill Sheat CNZM OBE
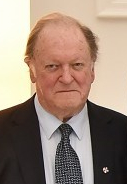
- Sheat in 2018
- Born: William Newton Sheat; 1 May 1930; Hāwera, New Zealand
- Died: 20 January 2021 (aged 90); Lower Hutt, New Zealand
- Education: Victoria University College
- Occupation: Lawyer
- Known for: Arts advocacy
- Relatives: William Sheat (father)

William Newton Sheat CNZM OBE (1 May 1930 – 20 January 2021) was a New Zealand lawyer and arts advocate whose input was instrumental in many arts organisations including as a founding member of the New Zealand Film Commission, Creative New Zealand (formerly The Queen Elizabeth ll Arts Council) and Downstage Theatre.

== Early life ==
Sheat was born in 1930 in Hāwera, Taranaki. His mother was Ella Marjorie Sheat (née Newton) and his father William Sheat, who was a member of parliament. Both Sheat and his father are William Sheat and both are known as Bill. He grew up on a dairy farm and received his primary education in Pihama. He went to boarding school at New Plymouth Boys' High School. He went to Victoria University College in 1948 and studied arts and law. He got involved with drama club at university, acting and writing on the annual capping review (a skit show); this involvement expanded to producing and writing, and continued for many years after he graduated in 1953.

== Career ==
Over his career Sheat practised as a lawyer and at the same time was involved in theatre and performing arts. He was on many boards of arts organisations in various roles including chair, he continued acting and directing on occasions and he was part of many significant initiatives in theatre as the professional scene emerged in the 1960s in New Zealand. This ranged from Downstage, New Zealand's first professional theatre, to a government funding body the Queen Elizabeth ll Arts Council, to Playmarket, New Zealand agent for playwrights and setting up the national drama school Toi Whakaari. Sheat also encouraged investment in a New Zealand film industry for New Zealand films with the founding of the New Zealand Film Commission.

=== Law ===
In his legal profession Sheat was admitted as a solicitor in 1953 and as a barrister in 1954. He continued to hold his practising certificate until 2013. He joined the law firm Rothwell Gibson Page & Marshall in 1957 which then became Gibson, Page, Marshall and Sheat. The company changed to the current name of Gibson and Sheat in 1966. Sheat became a specialist in transport law and was the legal adviser for 30 years to the New Zealand Road Transport Forum. Sheat also specialised in entertainment law including intellectual property and was part of setting up many charitable trusts for arts organisations.

=== Arts ===
Theatre was a love of Sheat's since he got involved with the drama club at university. At the drama club he acted in plays including as 'chief rustic' of Much Ado About Nothing by Shakespeare produced by Maria Dronke in 1955 and wrote sketches and directed shows such as Guided Mistletoe (Christmas revue, 1962). He went on to be involved with the Wellington Repertory Theatre company, directing many plays as well as acting in them. Plays he directed include The Seven Year Itch, by George Axelrod at the Grand Opera House, Wellington in 1959, and She'll be Right, at the Concert Chamber in the Town Hall in 1960. She'll be Right was devised and directed with his colleague Terry Browne.

In 1963, Sheat was appointed to the drama panel of the newly formed Queen Elizabeth ll Arts Council, later he became the Chair and remained until 1972. The Queen Elizabeth ll Arts Council was set up by the government to provide support for professionalism in the arts and wider access to the public for arts in New Zealand, it is now Creative New Zealand. During the inception of Downstage Theatre, Sheat was invited to be part of the early conversations with Tim Eliott, Martyn Sanderson, Peter Bland and Harry Seresin because of his practical nature. The discussion group also included academics John Roberts, Don McKenzie, James Ritchie and playwright Bruce Mason.

From 1973 to 1975, Sheat was the president of The New Zealand Theatre Federation that represents community theatre and was made a life member.

Alongside John O'Shea, Sheat championed a local film body modelled on the Australian film commissions and was the founding Chair of the New Zealand Film Commission in 1978, prior to that he had chaired a working party to create a local film body. He stayed as chair until 1985. Other chairperson roles include the Royal New Zealand Ballet and the Shakespeare Globe Centre New Zealand Trust. Toi Whakaari: The New Zealand Drama School started in 1970 with Nola Millar the first director, Sheat was the inaugural Chair of the Board. Sheat was also founding chair of the NZ Film Festival Trust, and an executive member of Playmarket.

Three Wellington performing arts venues that owe a lot to Sheat are the Hannah Playhouse, the Opera House and the Embassy Theatre. Sheat was part of Downstage Theatre during the commissioning and building of the Hannah Playhouse. In the 1970s the Opera House was earmarked for destruction, and Sheat was part of a group that saved it. Likewise years later the Embassy Theatre was also at risk of demolition. Sheat was Chair of Embassy Theatre Trust from 1990 to 2007 when it was saved and renovated.

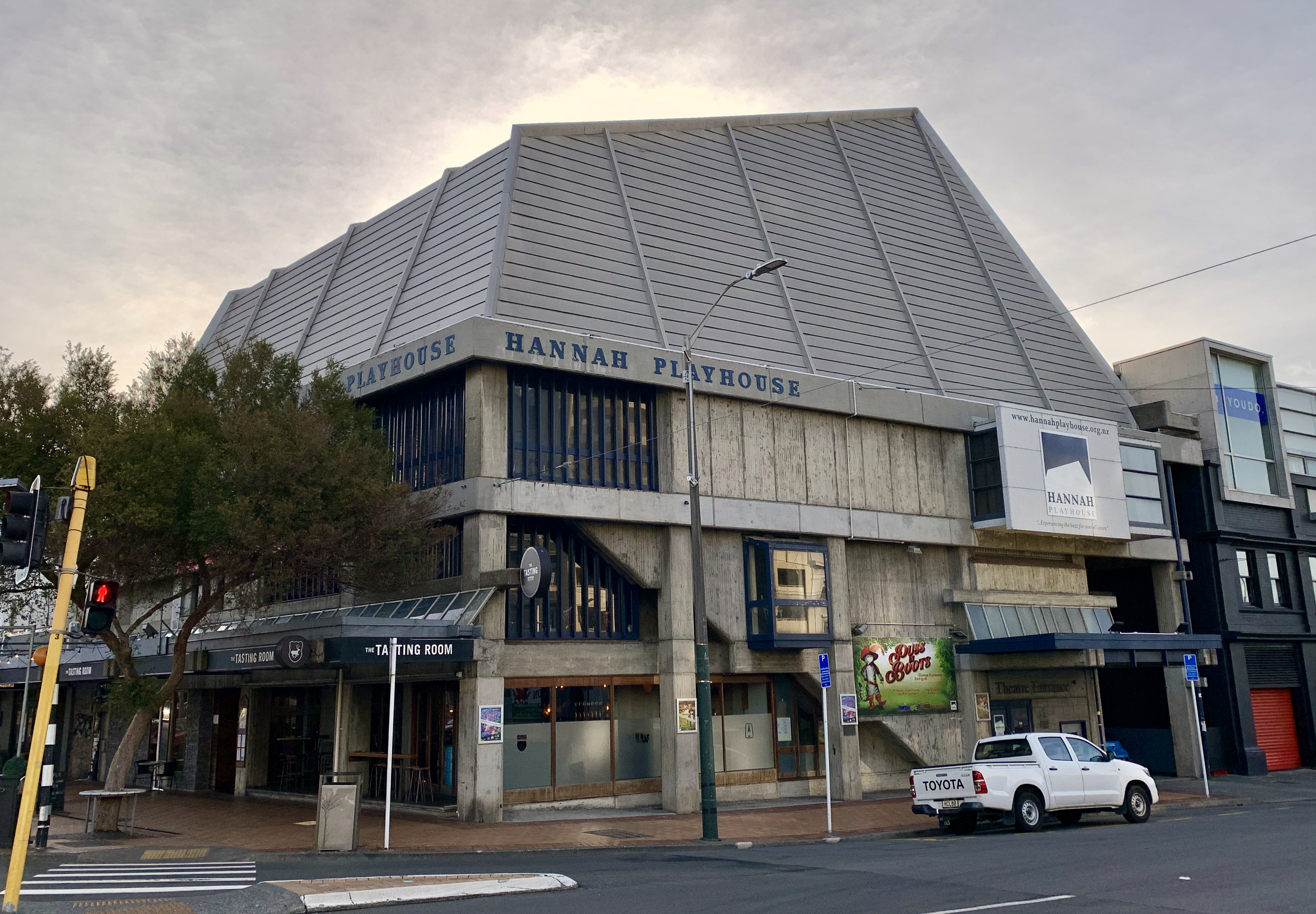
The Hannah Playhouse

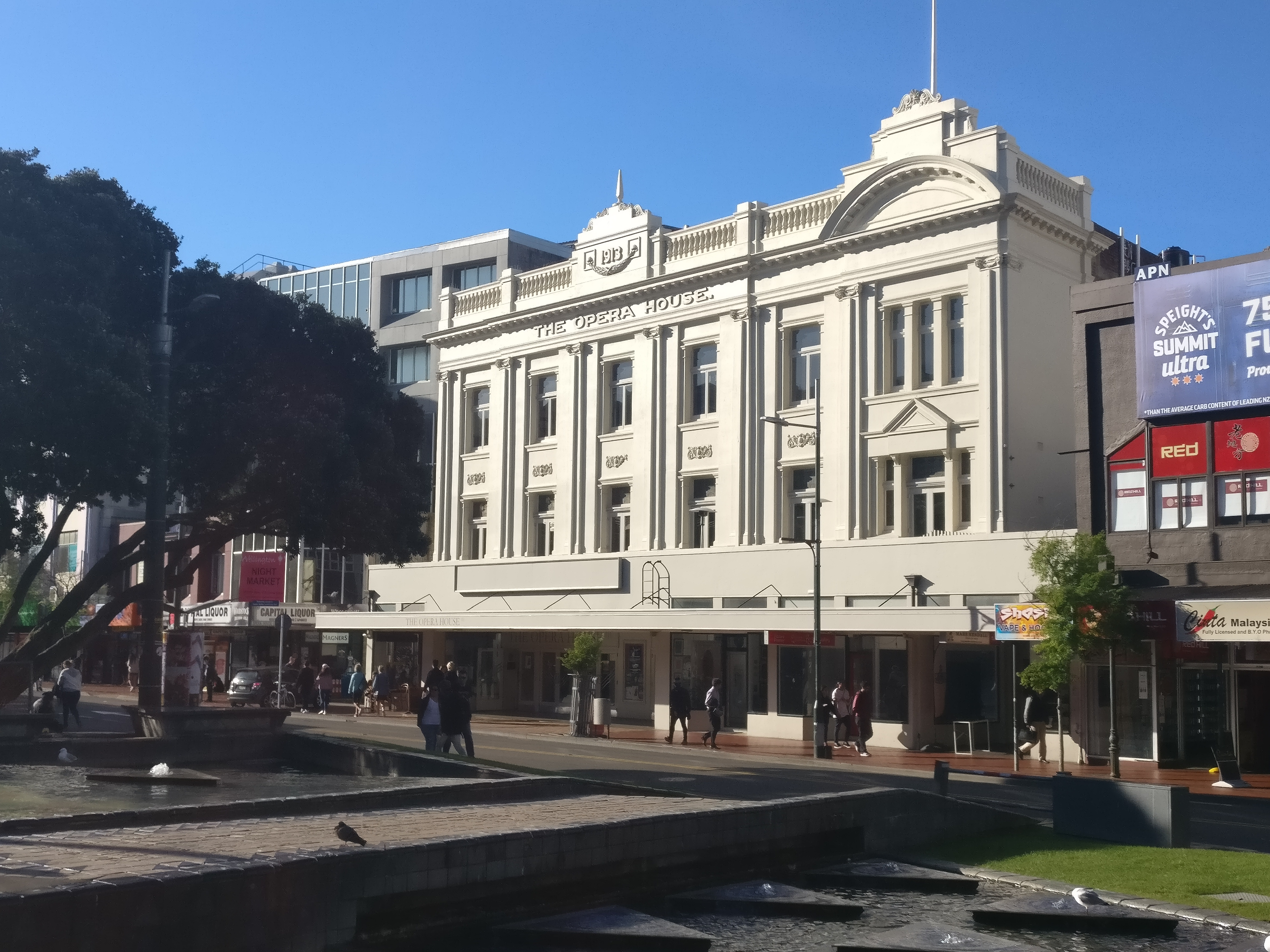
The Opera House

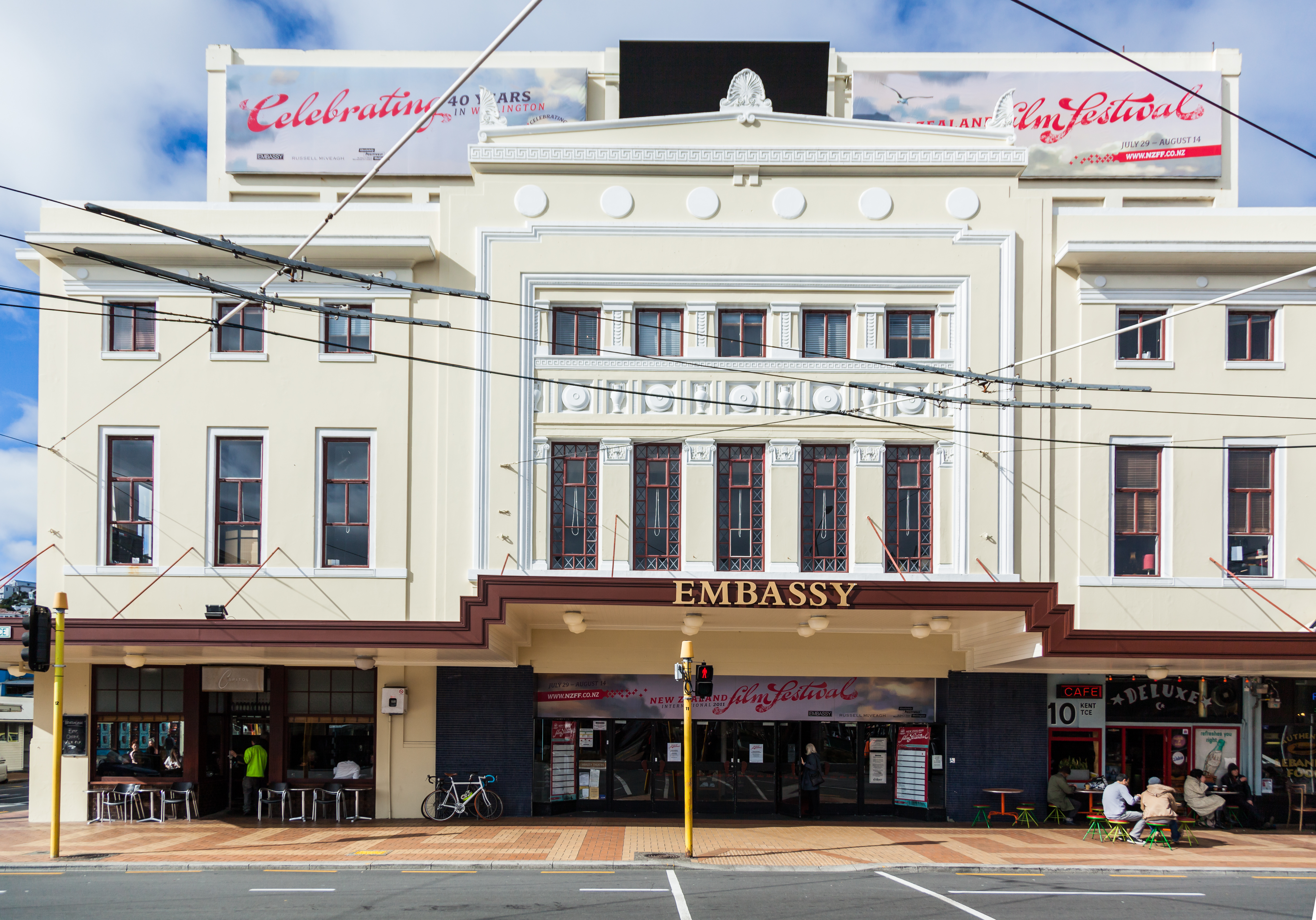
Embassy Theatre

== Honours and awards ==
In the 1973 New Year Honours, Sheat was appointed an Officer of the Order of the British Empire, for services to the arts. In the 2011 Queen's Birthday Honours, he was made a Companion of the New Zealand Order of Merit, also for services to the arts.

Sheat received the Mayor's Award for Significant Contribution to Theatre at the 2009 Chapman Tripp Theatre Awards. In recognition of outstanding contribution Victoria University of Wellington awarded Sheat a Hunter Fellowship in 2010, and in 2019, Sheat was named as a Wellington Icon at the Wellington Gold Awards.

== Personal life and death ==
Sheat married Genevieve Mary Leicester (1932–2008) in 1956. She was the daughter of Wilfred Erne Leicester and Mary Mercer Leicester. They had two sons and one daughter. His wife supported theatre and also worked in the legal sector including being a legal executive.

After a short illness Sheat died in Lower Hutt on 20 January 2021.
