= Sunny Amey =

New Zealand theatre director and educator

Sunny Amey (born 1928) is a theatre director and educator born in New Zealand. She worked at the National Theatre of England during its formative years alongside Laurence Olivier, as artistic director of Downstage Theatre in the 1970s and the director of New Zealand's national drama school Toi Whakaari in the late 1980s.

== Background ==
Amey was born in 1928 and grew up in Wellington. She attended Seatoun School and Wellington East Girls' College and then trained as a teacher at Wellington Teachers College.

== Career ==
Amey was a member of Wellington's Unity Theatre in the late 1940s and the 1950s. Other members included Bruce Mason, Nola Millar, Richard Campion and Edith Campion, George Webby, Grant Tilly, and Ann Flannery.

Early on in her career Amey travelled from New Zealand to England twice. Her first trip in the early 1950s included her taking courses in London with Brian Way in children's theatre. On the second trip, which was funded on a New Zealand Internal Affairs bursary, she ended up working with Laurence Olivier as production assistant on his newly formed Chichester Festival Theatre. She then followed him when he formed the National Theatre Company and worked there in a variety of jobs including assistant director to Olivier, she was repertory manager prior to her departure and she was at the National Theatre for five and half years.

Amey was the director of Downstage Theatre in Wellington from 1970 - 1974, this included the transition from a temporary venue at the Star Boating Club to Downstage's bespoke dinner theatre building the Hannah Playhouse. In her tenure as director Amey programmed a large number of New Zealand plays, something that was not common in New Zealand at the time, with most theatre productions being from English or American playwrights.

After Downstage, Amey took a position of Curriculum Officer for Drama at the Ministry of Education in New Zealand. She was there from 1975 to 1988. During this time in 1984 the New Zealand Association of Drama in Education, now known as Drama New Zealand was formed.

In 1989 Amey became an interim director of Toi Whakaari: New Zealand Drama School and was there until 1991.

Part of Amey's work in theatre was her input, guidance and support of Taki Rua Theatre as it went from a New Zealand focused theatre in the 1980s to a Māori theatre company at the end of the 1990s. She was named as a kaumātua / elder of Taki Rua alongside Tungia Baker, John Tahuparae, Wi Kuki Kaa, Bob Wiki, Rona Bailey and Keri Kaa.

== Notable work ==
- Takitoru (1995). Directors / choreographers: Sunny Amey, Jan Bolwell and Keri Kaa. A combination of haka and the highland fling. Won Production of the Year in the Chapman Tripp Theatre Awards.
- As You Like It (1973). Director. This was the premier production in the new Hannah Playhouse for Downstage Theatre. Set and costume design by Raymond Boyce.
