= James Beard (architect) =

New Zealand architect

Jim Beard
- Born: James Albert Beard; 25 July 1924; Christchurch, New Zealand
- Died: 30 October 2017 (aged 93); Wellington, New Zealand
- Occupation: Architect
- Projects: Beard House; PSIS Investment House; Hannah Playhouse; Twin Lakes (incl. Te Marua Water Treatment Plant); Mui Potu Conservation

James Albert Beard (25 July 1924 – 30 October 2017) was a New Zealand architect, town planner, and landscape architect.

== Training and education ==
Born in Christchurch in 1924, Beard trained in architecture at Auckland University, and was an early member of the Wellington Architectural Centre (formed in 1946). He worked for the Ministry of Works architectural office becoming a cadet supervisor in the late 1940s. He was actively involved with the Wellington Architectural Centre, particularly in the 1940s, 1950s and 1980s. After passing the Royal Town Planning Institute (London) examinations in Wellington (while working at the New Zealand Ministry of Works), he received a scholarship and went to M.I.T. to study city planning (1951–1952). Later at Harvard University he studied for a master's degree in Landscape Architecture. In the 1960s he co-founded Gabites and Beard Registered Architects and Town Planning Consultants in Wellington and played an active role in the New Zealand Institute of Architects. In the late 1960s he returned to America to work as a Research Assistant (1967–1968) at the Harvard Graduate School of Design where he worked with Peter Hornbeck and Peter Jacobs co-producing Highway Esthetics: functional criteria for planning and design (Cambridge: Harvard University Press, 1968).

== Private practice ==
From 1971 to 1972, Beard was part of the architectural partnership Gabites, Toomath, Beard, Wilson & partners. Following this he formed James Beard & Co. In the 1980s he was responsible for the major repair, strengthening and restoration of the Katherine Mansfield Birthplace in Thorndon, including substantial conservation research (this material and documentation is deposited at the Alexander Turnbull Library), and was extensively involved in the New Zealand Institute of Landscape Architects.

Beard was involved in a range of buildings and landscape design. He is recognised for his residential work (especially the Beard House, Hauraki Street, Karori (1955), and apartment design in the 1960s), and two well-known inner city Wellington buildings: the Hannah Playhouse (1973) for Downstage Theatre, and P.S.I.S. Investment House (1976). He was involved in significant landscape projects (e.g. the Te Marua Lakes Project, Kaitoke Regional Park). His work was characterised as a multi-disciplinary practice, drawing on his skills in the fields of architecture, landscape architecture and town planning. He was also involved in teaching architecture at a tertiary level at Auckland University, Wellington Technical College, Wellington Polytechnic and Victoria University of Wellington.

Beard died in Wellington on 30 October 2017.

== Service to the profession ==
Elected a Fellow of the New Zealand Institute of Architects in 1969, Beard was closely involved in the institute at a national level, serving on the education committee (1968–1970), publications committee (1965–1969), journal committee (1963–1964) and library and journal committee (1964–1965). He was the president of the Wellington Architectural Centre (1962), a committee member (1958–1960, 1982–1986), and was honoured as a life member. His service to the design community also included involvement with the New Zealand Institute of Landscape Designers, and the New Zealand Institute of Landscape Architects, of which he was made an Honorary Fellow in 1998.

== Influence and significance ==
Beard was a significant New Zealand architect. In his work at the Ministry of Works he influenced a generation of architects (including people such as Bill Alington). He was one of the few New Zealand architects of his generation to undertake postgraduate study at an overseas university, studying town planning at the Massachusetts Institute of Technology, and then landscape architecture at Harvard University. He was thus one of the few qualified town planners and landscape architects working in New Zealand in the 1950s and 1960s. It was not until 1969 that Lincoln University established the Postgraduate Diploma in Landscape Architecture – the first full-time course in landscape architecture in Australasia.

Beard also made a significant contribution to concrete apartment design in Wellington in the late 1950s and early 1960s, examples of which exist in Hamilton Road, Hataitai, Tapiri Street/William Street, Hataitai, Brougham Street, Mount Victoria, and Wellington Road, Kilbirnie. These were exercises in providing both liveable modern homes and efficient planning, at a time when single unit detached dwellings were the norm. He is perhaps best known within architectural circles for his significant contribution to Wellington's inner city examples of Brutalist architecture, namely the Hannah Playhouse (1973) and PSIS Investment House (1976).

His work on the Katherine Mansfield Birthplace is also significant as a contribution to New Zealand's national cultural heritage. This work included various reports and research work. The unpublished material is held within the Alexander Turnbull Library Manuscripts Collections. Published material on this work includes: Beard, James Mansfield Precinct (Wellington [N.Z.]: New Zealand Heritage and Conservation Trust and the Wellington Heritage and Conservation Trust, [2005]). Katherine Mansfield Birthplace received a New Zealand Tourism Award in 1994.

Beard contributed to New Zealand architecture and landscape design and architecture, as well as town planning throughout his career, both as a professional and as an astute and committed commentator in institute and organisational publications such as: New Zealand Architect/Architecture New Zealand, The Landscape, Cuttings, and Off Centre. He gave service to organisations such as the Wellington Architectural Centre, the New Zealand Institute of Architects, the New Zealand Institute of Landscape Designers, and founded the Wellington Heritage and Conservation Trust as part of his efforts to lobby for a better built environment. As Michael Jones has noted, "Beard has exerted a sustained influence on late 1960s attitudes to the landscape – as a regular commentator on national and civic policy and action." (Jones "Professional recognition" p. 9.)

His work, in particular the Hannah Playhouse, is also deemed to have national significance as it is represented in the Drawings, Photographs and Manuscripts Collections at the Alexander Turnbull Library at the National Library in Wellington. In addition both the libraries at the Schools of Architecture at University of Auckland, and Victoria University hold collections of Beard's writings on Architecture, Landscape Architecture, and Town Planning. The Hannah Playhouse used by Downstage Theatre is also recognised with its inclusion in the Wellington City Council Heritage Building Inventory, and his and Al Gabites' 1965 proposed "Precinct Planning for Wellington" was exhibited in "Unbuilt Wellington," at the Wellington City Art Gallery.
