= Mervyn Thompson =

New Zealand playwright, academic, theatre director and coalminer

Mervyn Garfield Thompson (14 June 1935 – 10 July 1992) was a New Zealand playwright and theatre director. He was one of the founders of Court Theatre in Christchurch, an artistic director of Downstage Theatre in Wellington and writer in residence at the University of Canterbury. His theatrical writing championed the downtrodden and featured a revival and refinement of the genre of songspiel.

In 1984, following a rape accusation from a former student, Thompson was abducted, tied to a tree and threatened by a group of feminists.

== Life ==
Thompson was born in the small mining town of Kaitangata in South Otago. His family moved to the West Coast where he variously lived in mining towns such as Reefton and Runanga. he left school at the age of 15 and spent 5 years working as a coal miner. During this period he first became involved in amateur dramatics.

He attended Canterbury University in his twenties, studying English, and came under the influence of Ngaio Marsh. He played the role of Proculeius in her 1959 production of Antony and Cleopatra, from which he earned the nickname 'Proc' which stuck for the rest of his life. Graduating with an MA in 1964, he became a university lecturer in 1965. Thompson died of throat cancer in 1992. He had one son, who is autistic.

== Theatre ==
In 1970, Thompson and Yvette Bromley proposed the founding of a professional theatre in Christchurch, following the earlier establishment of Downstage in Wellington and Mercury Theatre in Auckland.

== Abduction and rape accusation ==
In February 1984, Thompson, then a lecturer at Auckland University, was abducted, threatened to have his penis cut off, and left tied to a tree in an Auckland park wearing a sign labelling him a rapist. The abduction was allegedly staged by a feminist action group based at the university following an accusation by one of his ex students. Thompson vigorously denied the accusation, admitting he had an affair with the ex-student but claiming it was consensual.

The abduction imitates the plot of a stage play Setting the Table by Renée, a friend of Thompson. Thompson had acted as dramaturg at the workshopping of the play. The incident made headlines for some time and had a major impact on Thompson's career, with protests at many performances of his solo show Coaltown Blues.

The controversy inspired the novel The Shag Incident by Stephanie Johnson, published in 2002.

== Plays ==
Title	Date of Premiere Production	Notes
O! Temperance	1972	
First Return	1974	
Songs to Uncle Scrim	11 March 1976	A songplay about the Great Depression. Uncle Scrim refers to broadcaster Colin Scrimgeour. First produced at Downstage Theatre, Wellington. The play was revived and extensively reworked for a Christchurch production in 1989.
A Night at the Races	1977	
Songs to the Judges	1980	A songplay about racial issues in New Zealand with music by William Dart. Two of the songs, "Gather Up the Earth" and "On That Day" are based on the sayings of Te Whiti o Rongomai.
The New Zealand Truth Show	1982	Covers 50 years of New Zealand history as seen through the filter of the tabloid newspaper "Truth". First performed at New Independent Theatre, Auckland.
Coaltown Blues	1984	Probably Thompson's best-known work, a solo show which played 114 performances in main centres and small towns.
Children of the Poor		Adapted from the 1934 novel by John A. Lee.
Jean and Richard	1990	Initially a radio play which won a Mobil Radio Award, it was adapted for the stage and premiered at Court Theatre. The play is a fantasy in which Jean Batten and Richard Pearse meet in the afterlife.
Lovebirds	1990	A semi-autobiographical drama on the theme of sexual addiction. Wagner's 'Tristan and Isolde" is interwoven with the story of the tempestuous affair between a sculptor and his lover.
Passing Through	1991	Directed by Stuart Devenie. Premiere Court II, Christchurch. A solo performance which was a personal journey through the history of New Zealand theatre, including excerpts from his own work and that of Bruce Mason and others. Passing Through played for three separate seasons in Christchurch and toured to Wellington, Dunedin and Auckland. A planned small town tour was cancelled due to Thompson's declining health.

== Bibliography ==
- Selected Plays – Pilgrims South Press, Dunedin, 1984 ISBN 0-908634-40-4 (First Return, O! Temperance, Songs to Uncle Scrim, Songs to the Judges)
- All My Lives (autobiography)
- Coaltown Blues (playscript) – Hazard Press, Christchurch
- Children of the Poor (playscript) – Hazard Press, Christchurch, 1990 ISBN 0-908790-11-2
- Singing the Blues (autobiography) – Blacktown Press, Christchurch, 1991 ISBN 0-473-01497-1
- Passing Through and Other Plays – Hazard Press, Christchurch 1992 ISBN 0-908790-38-4
