= Courtenay Place, Wellington =

Street in New Zealand

Coordinates: 41.2936°S 174.7816°E

Courtenay Place
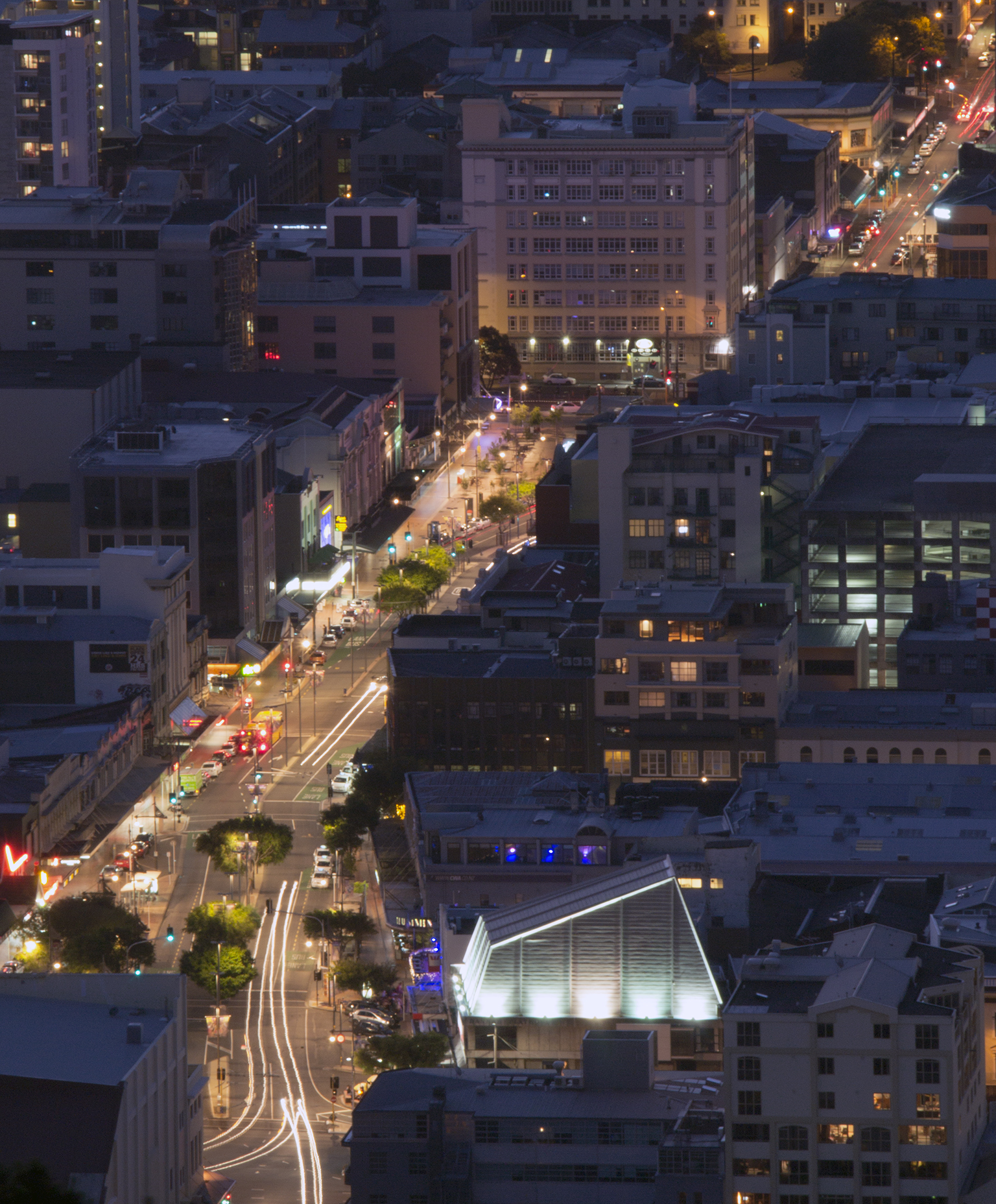
- Courtenay Place at night, view from Mount Victoria
- Interactive map of Courtenay Place
- Maintained by: Wellington City Council
- Length: 450 m (1,480 ft)
- Location: Te Aro, Wellington, New Zealand
- East end: Cambridge Terrace/Kent Terrace/Marjoribanks Street
- West end: Taranaki Street/Manners Street/Dixon Street

Courtenay Place is one of the main streets in the Wellington inner-city district of Te Aro. It is known for its entertainment and nightlife. Many restaurants open until late and most of the bars stay open until the early morning. Courtenay Place contains offices, accommodation, tourist shopping, entertainment, food, art and buskers. Pedestrian traffic is substantial during the evening. Courtenay Place is named after Viscount Courtenay, a director of the New Zealand Company.

== Location ==
Courtenay Place is approximately 440 metres (1,440 ft) long. It lies between the intersection of Taranaki, Dixon and Manners Streets in the west and the intersection with Kent and Cambridge Terraces at the eastern end. The street follows the curve of the original beach half a block to the north, although it was not right on the waterfront, and it splays at each end where it connects to other streets. Courtenay Place is the only retail area in central Wellington that is a wide street oriented east–west, with low buildings, meaning it receives a lot of sun and is somewhat sheltered from the prevailing north-westerly and southerly winds.

== History ==
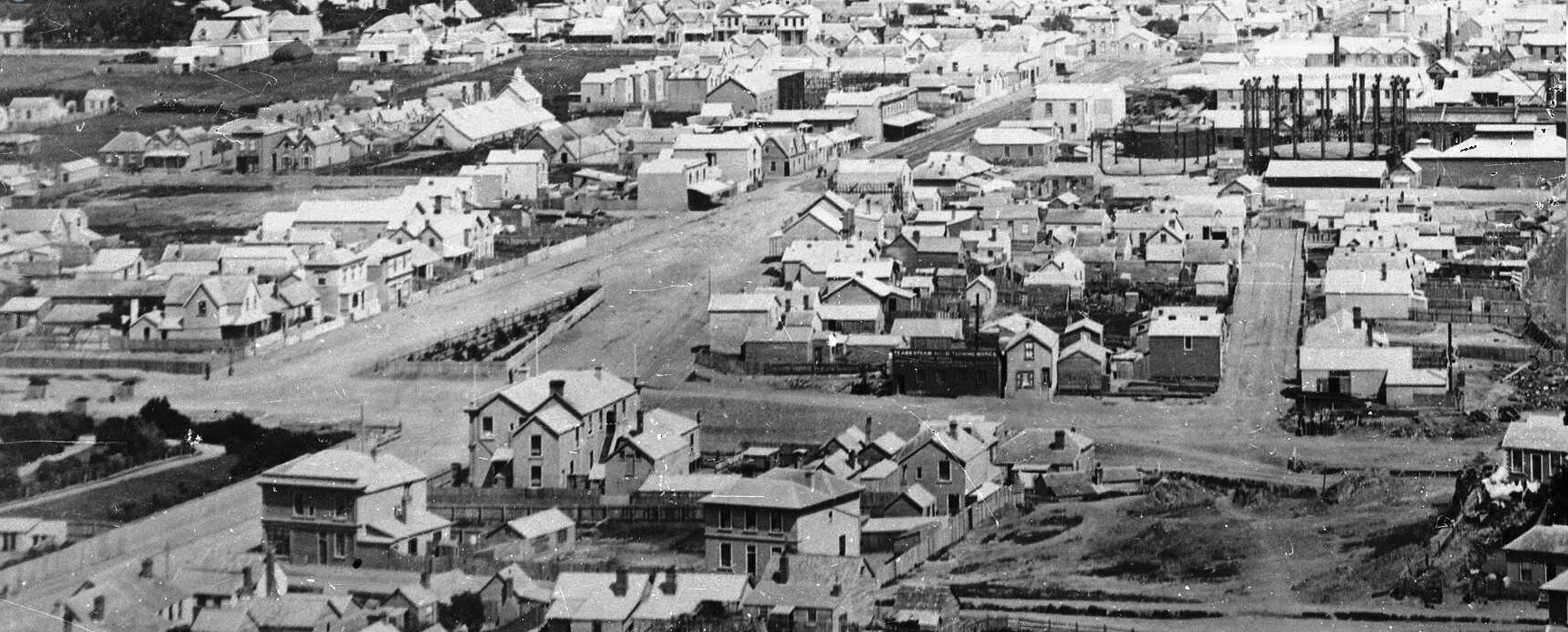
Courtenay Place 1878 looking west showing the gasometers

Until the 1870s when it was sold and subdivided, Te Aro Pā was situated just to the north of Courtenay Place near Taranaki Street. A remnant of a pā structure can be seen in situ at 39–43 Taranaki Street.

The area around Courtenay Place was very swampy until the land was raised and drained by the 1855 Wairarapa earthquake. This became a high density, working class area. Overcrowding and poor drainage and sanitation led to outbreaks of disease, including cases of typhoid in Courtenay Place in 1890–1892.

In 1871, the Wellington Gas Company constructed its coal to gas and coke plant and four gasometers on 3½ acres of reclaimed land just north of Courtenay Place, and in 1898 built their head office building beside it on the corner of Tory Street and Courtenay Place. The two-storey masonry building was used by the gas company until 1992, and is heritage-listed by Wellington City Council. As of 2026 the Wellington Gas Company's building is occupied by a KFC restaurant.

Public tram services in Wellington began in 1878 with a line from Lambton Quay to Newtown, and in 1881 a tram line was extended through Courtenay Place to Cambridge Terrace. This was the beginning of Courtenay Place's importance as a transport hub. In 1893, Te Aro railway station opened to the north of Courtenay Place near where the Museum Hotel is now located on Tory Street, bringing more people and business to this part of the city. The trams were electrified in 1904, decreasing patronage on the train, and Te Aro station closed in 1917.

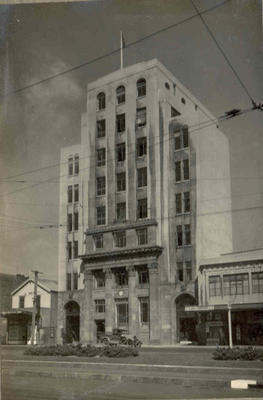
Courtenay Place Post Office, Cambridge Tce, c. 1925

Allen Street and Blair Street (both named after former mayors of Wellington) are two side streets that run from the eastern end of Courtenay Place to Wakefield Street. These two streets were part of the Grainger Street Block which stretched from Tory Street to Cambridge Terrace along the north side of Courtenay Place in the nineteenth century. The Wellington Harbour Board bought this land from Wellington City Council in 1898 as part of a harbour reclamation and dock scheme. It cleared the slum housing and businesses that existed in the "unsavoury" and "undesirable" neighbourhood, constructed Allen and Blair Streets and opened up the area to business development. Proximity to the Te Aro railway station was a drawcard. Large warehouses and wholesale fruit and produce markets, including the Wellington Produce Exchange, were built, contributing to making Courtenay Place a busy area during the twentieth century.

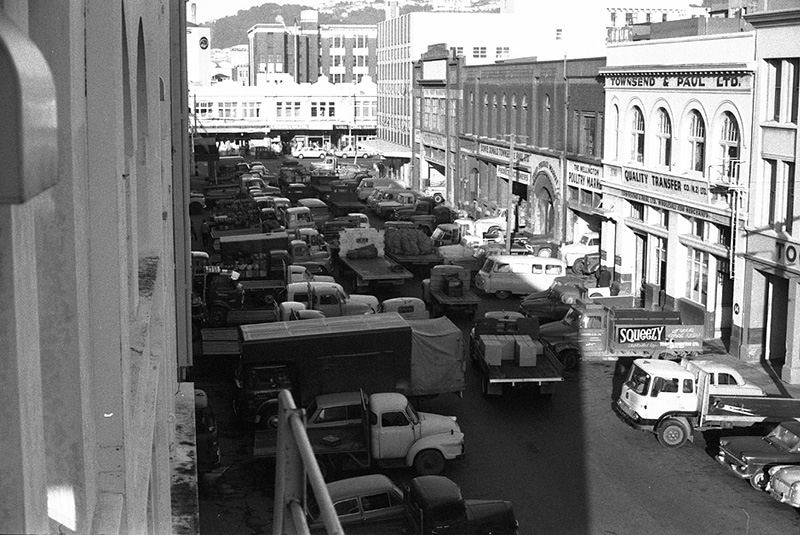
Trucks loading and unloading at the wholesale produce markets in Allen Street, 1967

Courtenay Place declined during the 1970s and 1980s. By the late 1980s the central business district around Lambton Quay and Willis Street was undergoing change with large new buildings being constructed, and there was concern that similar high-rise development would destroy the special character of Courtenay Place. At this stage there was still a mix of low-rent small businesses in Courtenay Place as well as the produce markets, and it was a convenient shopping area for residents of Mount Victoria.

In 1996 Wellington City Council began a major redesign of the eastern end of Courtenay Place. Existing bus stops in the middle of the road were removed, traffic flows changed and lanes realigned, new public toilets and bus stops created and new paving installed. in 2006 the council began a controversial redevelopment of the Taranaki Street end of Courtenay Place, removing a slip lane and creating a large paved area. From the 1990s, when Courtenay Place still had a variety of shops, businesses left the area and were replaced by entertainment venues. The Wellington Produce Exchange closed in 1992, and it and many of the other large buildings in Allen and Blair Streets were put to new use in the late 1990s: restaurants and bars opened on the ground floor of many of the warehouses, and the upper floors were used for offices or accommodation. As of 2026, almost every premises at ground level on Courtenay Place is a bar, restaurant, cafe or takeaway outlet.

Mark Blumsky, Mayor of Wellington from 1995 to 2001, was involved in rebranding Wellington as a tourist destination. In 1998 Wellington City Council provided financial assistance to Totally Wellington, an organisation that promoted shopping, tourism and events in the city. In 1999, Totally Wellington rebranded Wellington into four American-style 'quarters', each marketed as a distinct destination for shopping or entertainment. These were the Lambton Quarter, Willis Quarter, Cuba Quarter and the Courtenay Quarter. The Courtenay Quarter included Courtenay Place and nearby side streets including Allen and Blair Streets, and was marketed as an entertainment, restaurant and nightlife destination. The Courtenay Quarter concept fell out of use after 2019.

On 11 February 2025, Wellington City Council confirmed that it would begin work to pedestrianise the Golden Mile area between Lambton Quay and Courtenay Place in April 2025. This project would include removing cars and car parks, widening footpaths and building cycling lanes in the area. Wellington Chamber of Commerce chief executive Simon Arcus expressed concern that these changes could affect local businesses and emphasised the need for consultation.

== Theatres and cinemas ==
Courtenay Place has long been associated with movies and theatres.

=== BATS Theatre ===
BATS Theatre is located at 1 Kent Terrace, across the road from the end of Courtenay Place. The building has been used as a theatre since the 1940s, with BATS operating since the late 1970s. BATS focuses on the development of new theatre practitioners and plays.

=== Downstage Theatre ===
Opposite BATS, on the corner of Courtenay Place and Cambridge Terrace, is the Hannah Playhouse. This purpose-built theatre venue in Brutalist style was designed for Downstage Theatre and opened in 1973. Downstage closed in 2013.

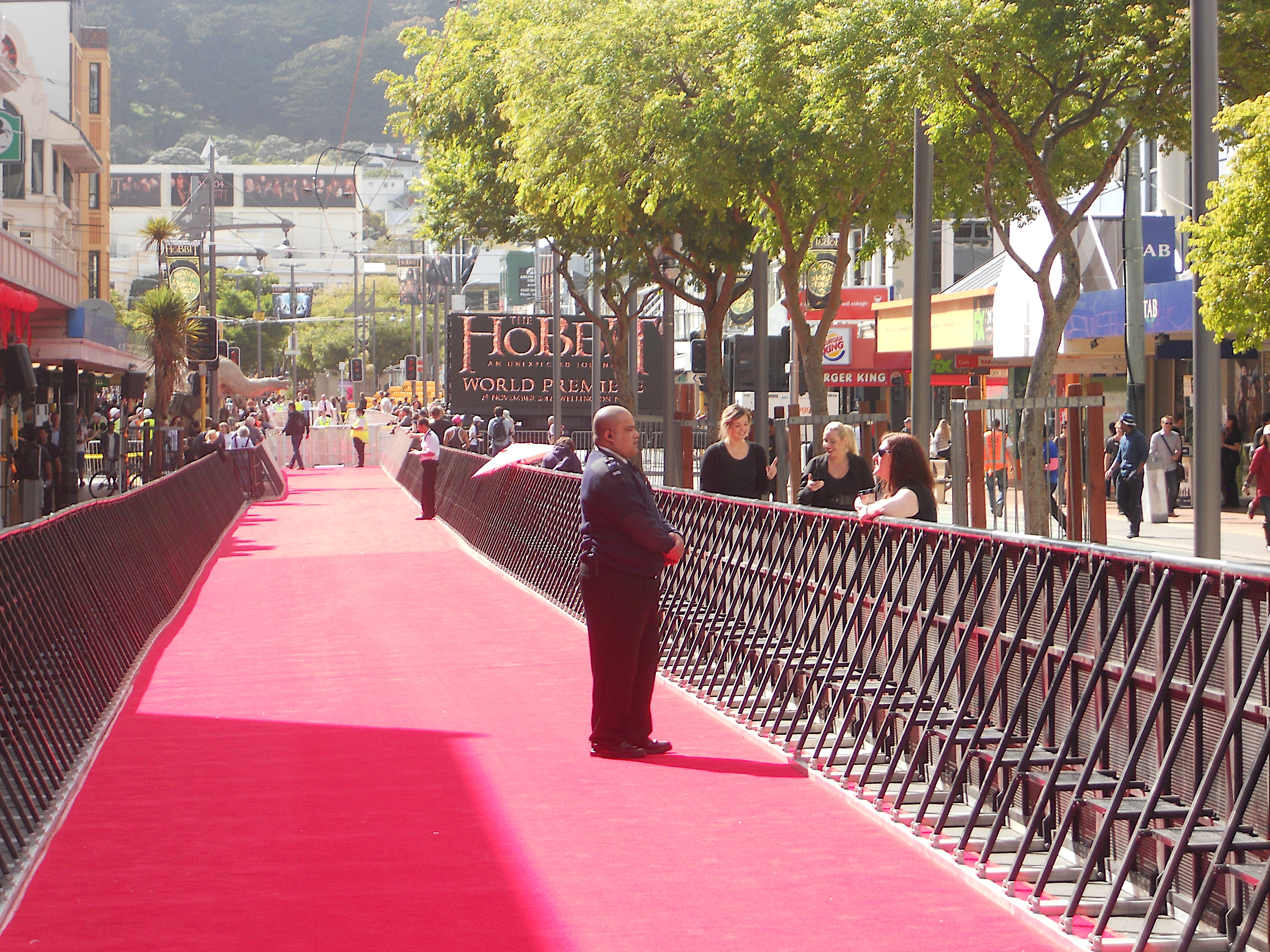
The red carpet along Courtenay Place for the world premiere of The hobbit: an unexpected journey, with the Embassy in the distance

=== Embassy Theatre ===
The Embassy Theatre is located on Kent Terrace directly facing Courtenay Place. The theatre is on Wellington City Council's heritage list in the District Plan. Heritage New Zealand has recognised its heritage values with Category 1 registration, indicating a place of 'special or outstanding historical or cultural heritage significance or value'. The Embassy was built in 1924 and originally known as the 'De Luxe'. Designed by Llewellyn Williams and constructed of reinforced concrete, it included classical external and internal architectural details. The name changed to the Embassy in 1945. The theatre was purchased by the Embassy Theatre Trust in 1997 and refurbished, with financial underwriting of the refurbishment programme by Wellington City Council. Ownership was transferred to the WCC under the terms of the agreement. The Lord of the Rings movie The Return of the King had its world premiere at the Embassy, and The Two Towers and The Fellowship of the Ring both had their Australasian premieres at the Embassy. Both events were broadcast live to the world.

=== Paramount Theatre ===
The Paramount Theatre at 25-29 Courtenay Place opened as a cinema in 1917 and until 2017 was Wellington's oldest surviving cinema still operating under its original name. The Paramount was the first place in Australasia to show a "talkie" movie, in 1929. The cinema closed in 2017, following its sale to developers, and as of 2026 is used as office space. The building is classified as a Historic Place Category 2 by Heritage New Zealand.

=== Cinerama ===
The Cinerama (formerly the State) was a movie theatre at 61 Courtenay Place. It opened in 1933 and closed in 1987.

=== Reading Courtenay ===
Reading Courtenay Central was a ten-screen multiplex cinema complex, with a food court and other shops, located at 100 Courtenay Place. The site was bulldozed in the mid-1980s by Chase Corporation for the proposed Wakefield Centre, but after the company fell victim to the 1987 share market crash, the site remained derelict for years until it was purchased by Reading Cinemas and the cinema complex opened in 2001. The 8,000 m^{2} development linked Courtenay Place with Wakefield Street and was designed to complement the existing character of the strip. This project won the 2003 Property Council NZ Entertainment Excellence Award. The complex was temporarily shut down for safety reasons after the 2016 Kaikōura earthquake damaged an adjacent parking building beyond repair. After reopening following the demolition of the parking building, the complex shut down again in 2019 due to newly identified structural issues. The site was sold to a property developer in January 2025.

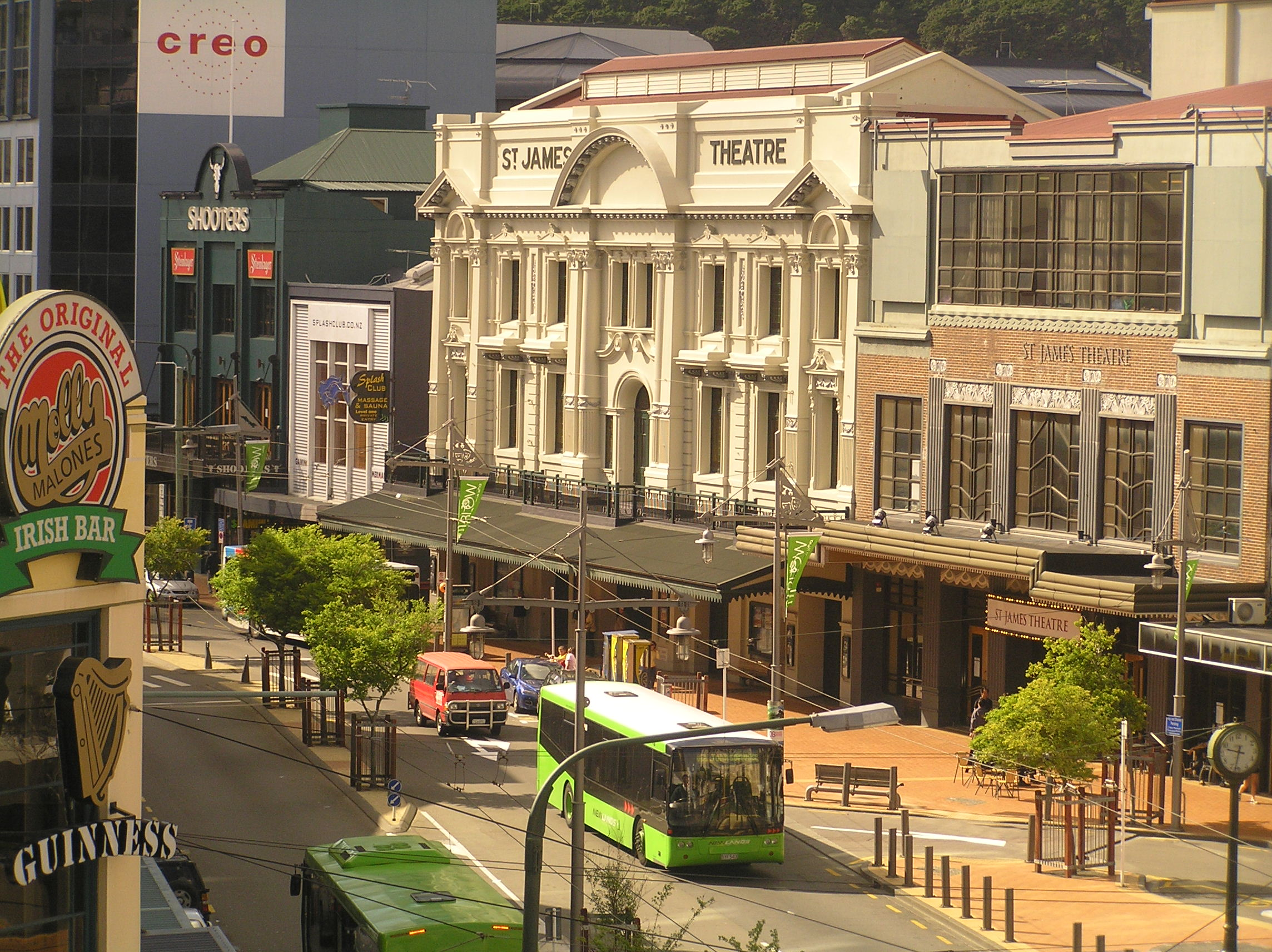
The St James theatre

=== St James Theatre ===
St James Theatre, formerly known as His Majesty's, was the first steel-framed concrete-coated proscenium-arched theatre in the Southern Hemisphere. The steel frame allowed for an unsupported 80 ft (25 m) span roof structure and also provided good resistance to earthquake damage. It opened in 1912 at 77-87 Courtenay Place, and showed both movies and theatrical productions. The building is classified as a Historic Place Category 1 by Heritage New Zealand.

== Other points of interest ==
Wellington City Council lists over 20 buildings in Courtenay Place and neighbouring side streets on its heritage list. These are notable for their architecture or historical and cultural significance, illustrating the development of the street over the 20th century. Interesting features in the area include two former public toilet blocks.

=== 'Taj Mahal' ===
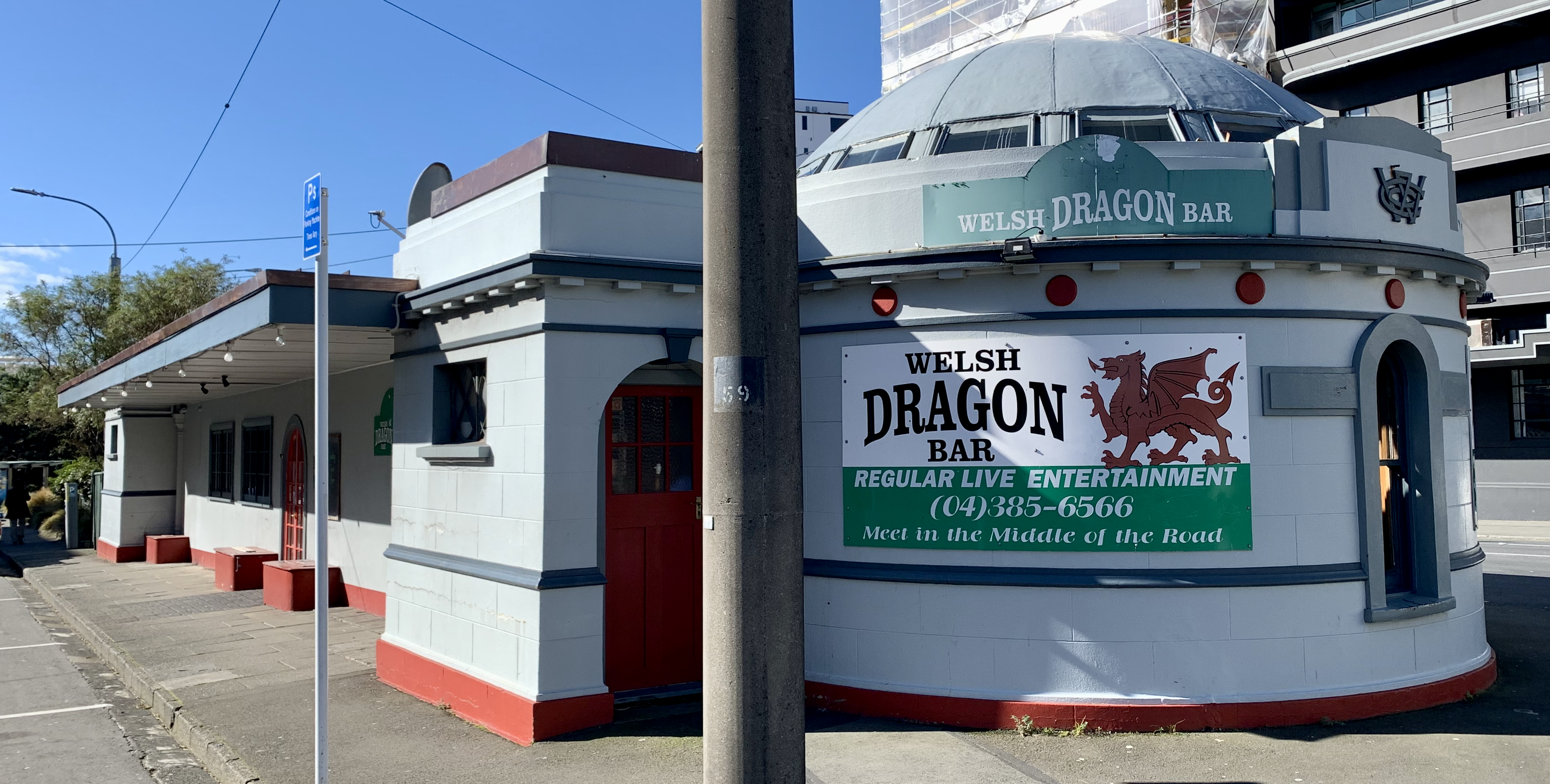
Former public toilets, nicknamed the 'Taj Mahal'

'Taj Mahal' is the nickname of a building on the median strip opposite Downstage Theatre, between Kent and Cambridge Terraces at the end of Courtenay Place. The building was constructed in 1928 and opened in July 1929 as public toilets for tram passengers. With a dome at each end, the building quickly became known as the Taj Mahal. In 1966 the toilets were closed due to difficulty of access and lack of use. The building was saved from demolition by public protest, and since then has been used as storage for Downstage Theatre, an art gallery, and as home to various bars and restaurants.

=== Former men's toilets ===
At the western end of Courtenay Place was a men's public toilets. It is one of the oldest remaining buildings in the area. The toilets opened in 1911 to serve tram passengers and patrons from nearby bars, and were built half-underground to make them less obtrusive. From the 1960s on there were many complaints to the Council about the condition of the toilet block and the men who hung around it, but the facility wasn't closed until 1994. The building was unused for years, until it was gutted and adapted for use as a pizza kiosk in 2011.

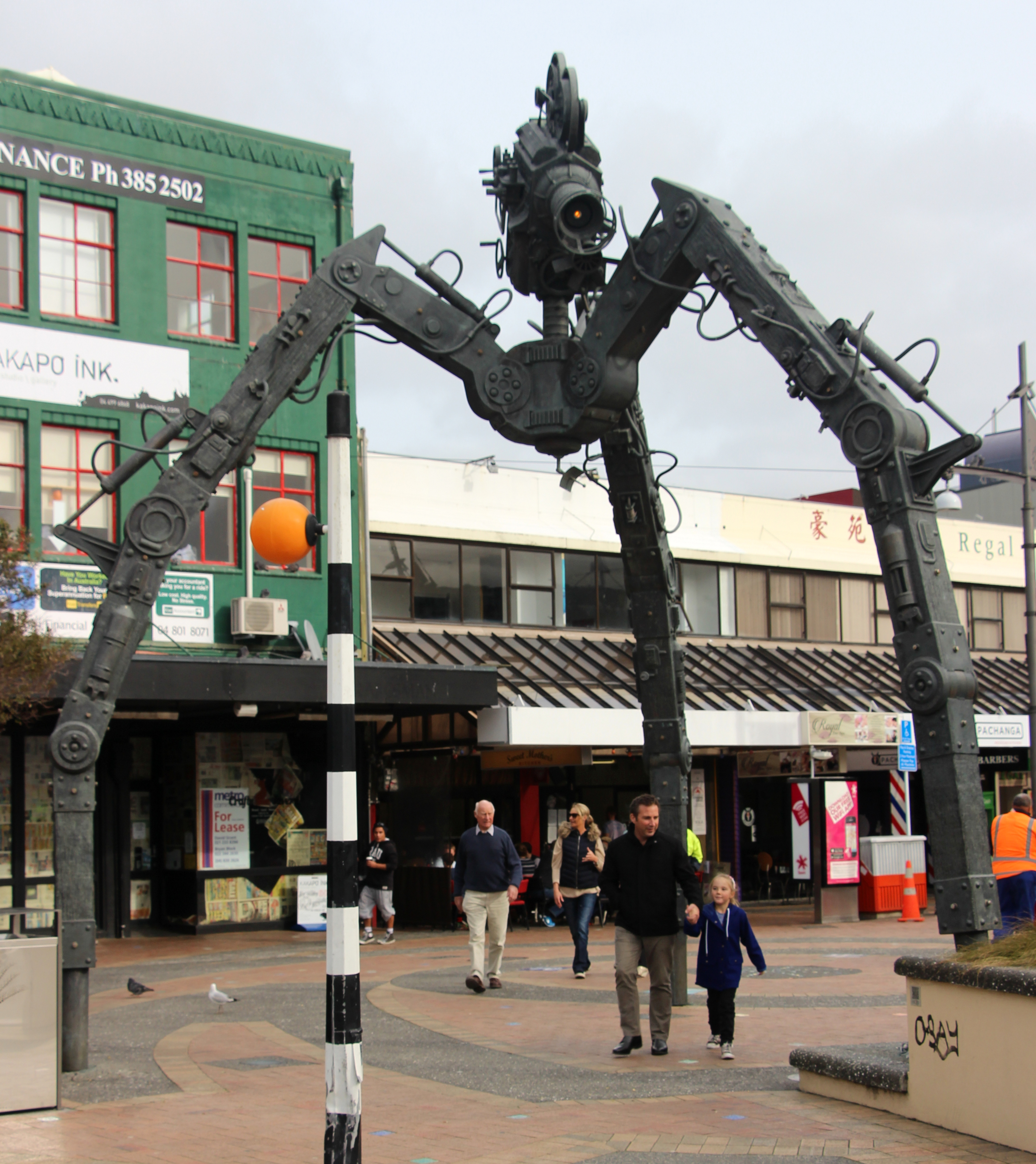
Tripod, Courtenay Place

=== Tripod ===
Tripod is a bronze sculpture of a film camera mounted on a 6.5 m tripod, which was installed at the eastern end of Courtenay Place opposite the Embassy Theatre in November 2005. Wētā Workshop was commissioned to create a sculpture to celebrate the film and television industry in Wellington. Tripod was designed by Greg Broadmore. The structure is intended to look as if it was cobbled together from various old mechanical parts and other items including a toasted sandwich maker and Nintendo Game Boys. Weta's Richard Taylor stated: "We wanted to pay tribute to the New Zealand screen industry's number 8 wire attitude and ability to create with whatever is at hand". The sculpture was funded by Wellington City Council ($300,000) and Wētā Workshop ($150,000).

=== Light boxes ===
In 2008, eight 3 m high double-sided light boxes were installed at the newly developed paved area at the western end of Courtenay Place, close to the former toilets. The light boxes are used to display artworks, with the works exhibited changing every few months.

=== Electric clock ===
In 1927, a large electrically operated clock was installed at the eastern end of Te Aro Park opposite Courtenay Place by the Tramways Department. Originally known as the Tramways Clock, it was connected to small time recording machines along the tramlines as part of a system that helped tram conductors keep their trams running on time. When Te Aro Park was remodelled in the late 1980s, the clock was moved to the large paved area at the western end of Courtenay Place.

== Transport ==
Due to its location at the end of the central business district's Golden Mile and its prominence as an entertainment district, Courtenay Place is an important transport hub. Several cross-city routes pass through Courtenay Place, while others begin and end their routes there.

== Gallery ==
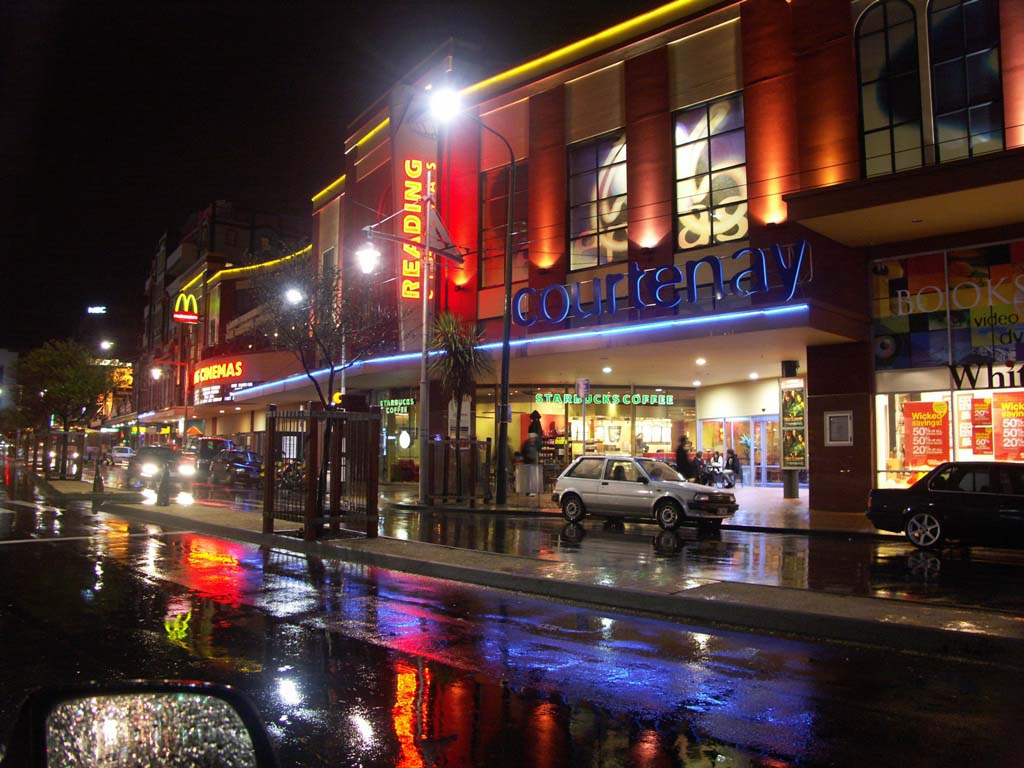
Reading Cinemas on Courtenay Place

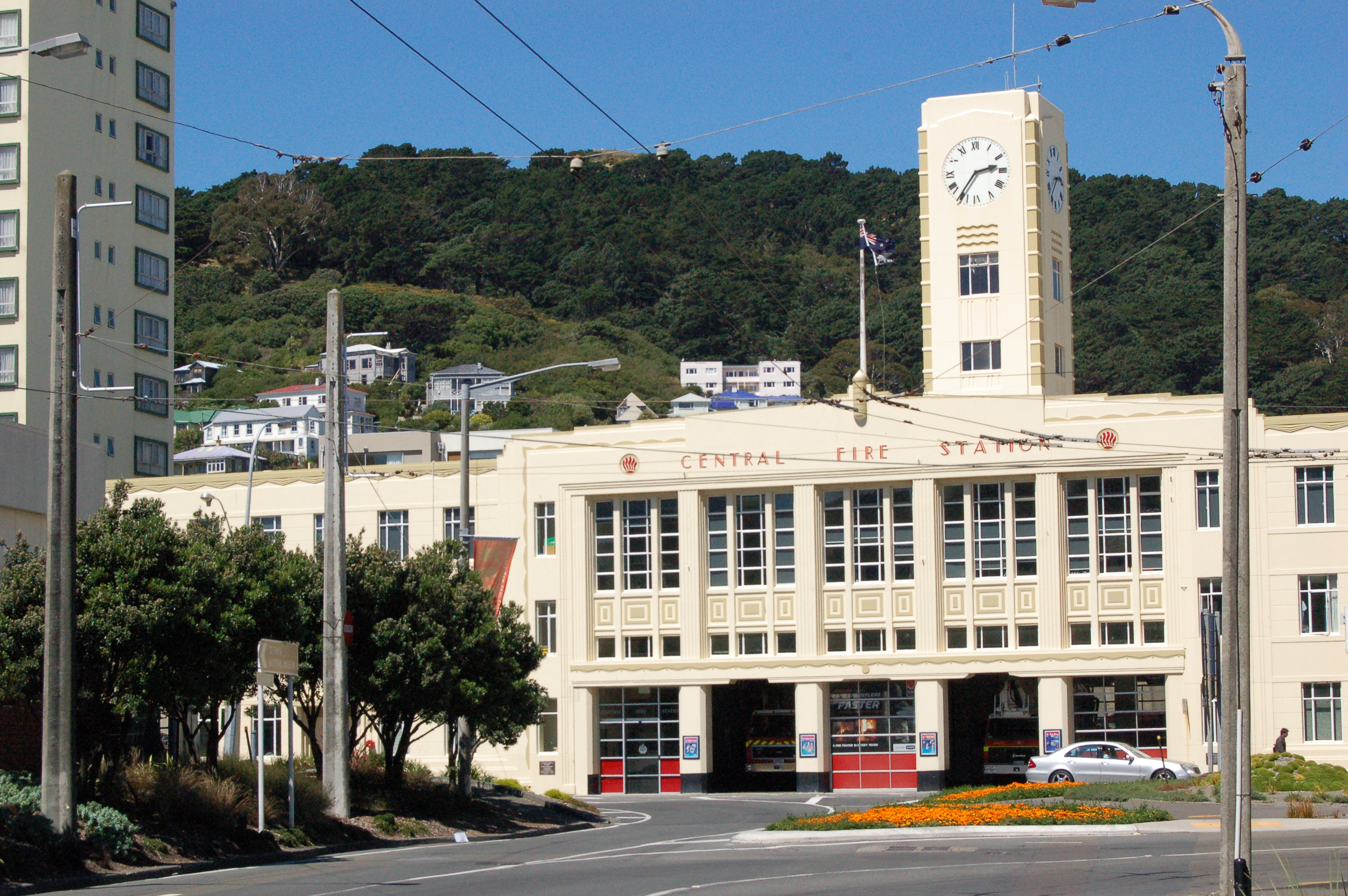
Courtenay Place's fire station

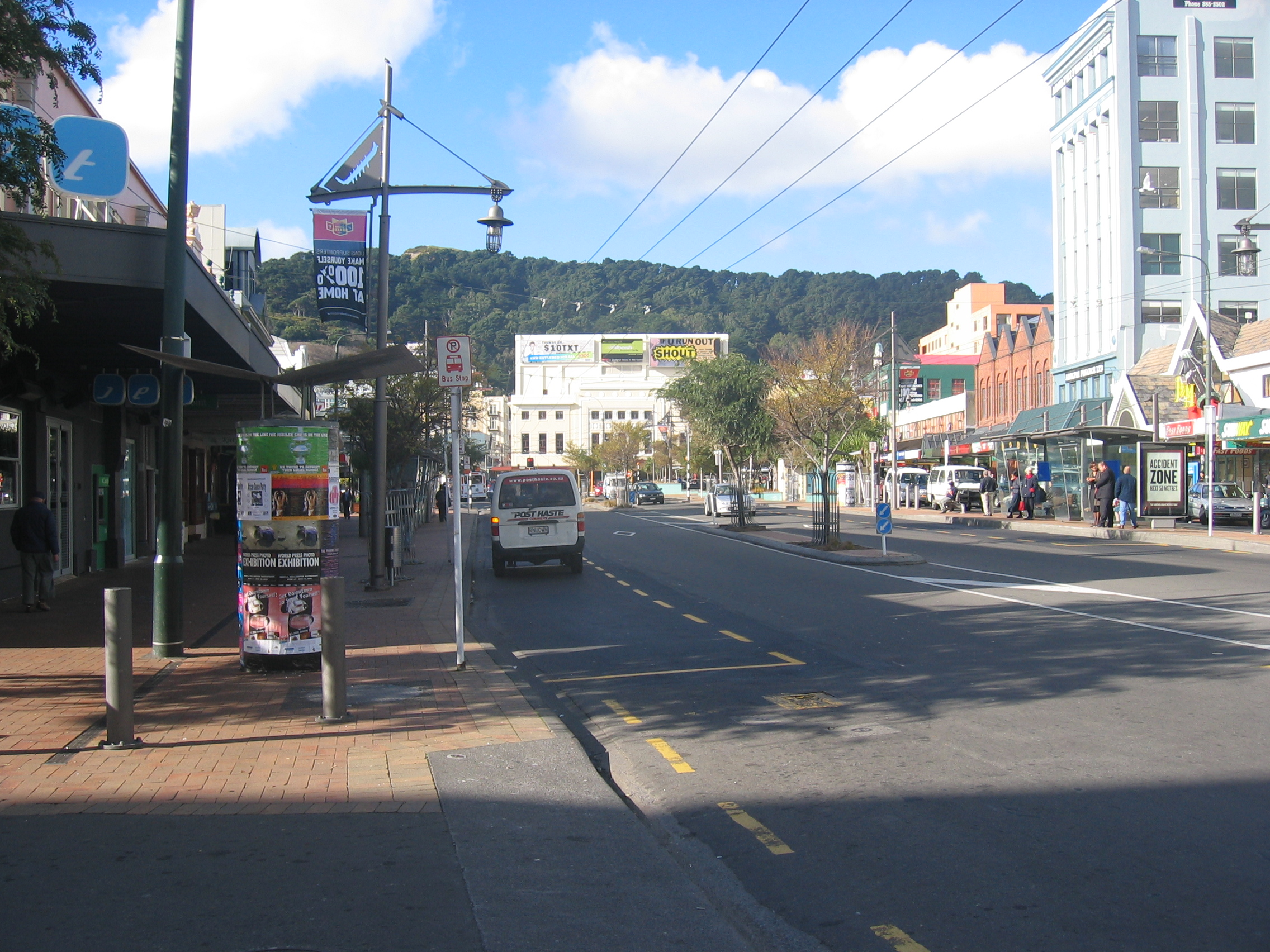
Courtenay Place, leading up to the Embassy Theatre. Rod's building (built 1902) is first left (pink)

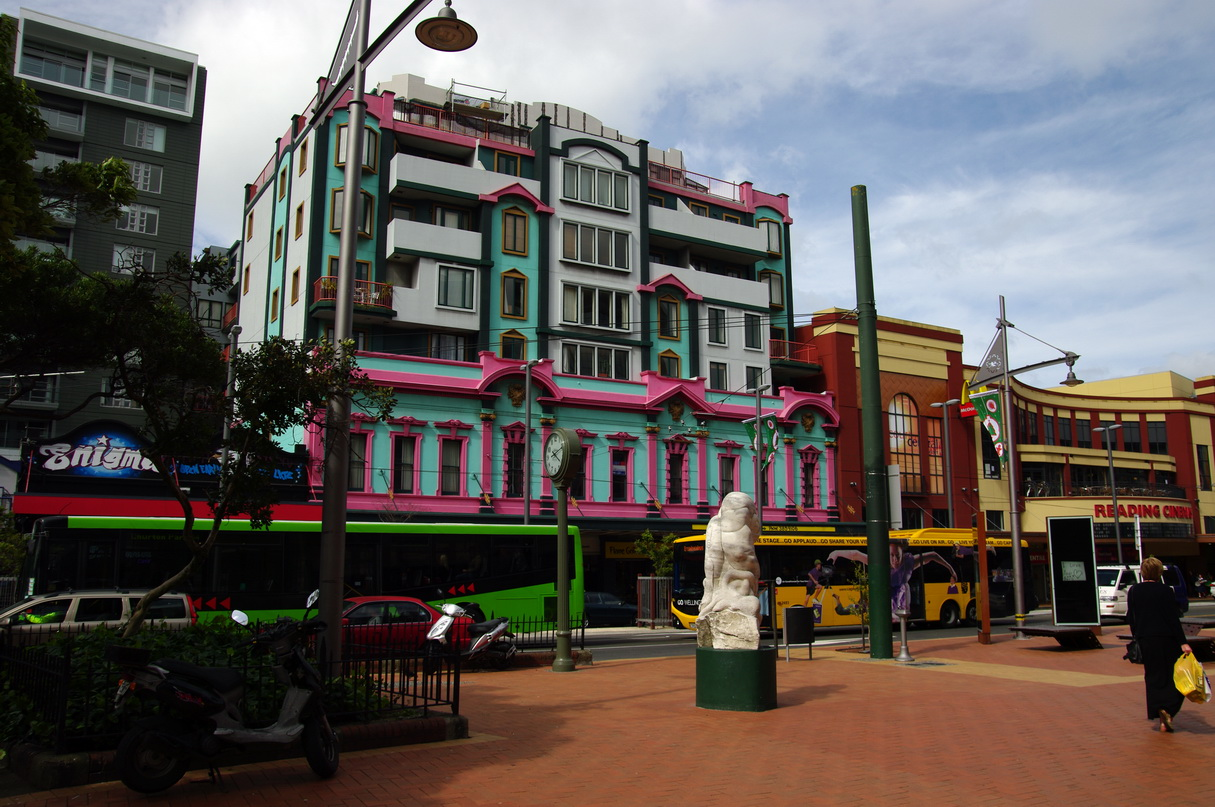
120 Courtenay Place with a restored façade. Settlers from China have been around Courtenay Place more than 150 years

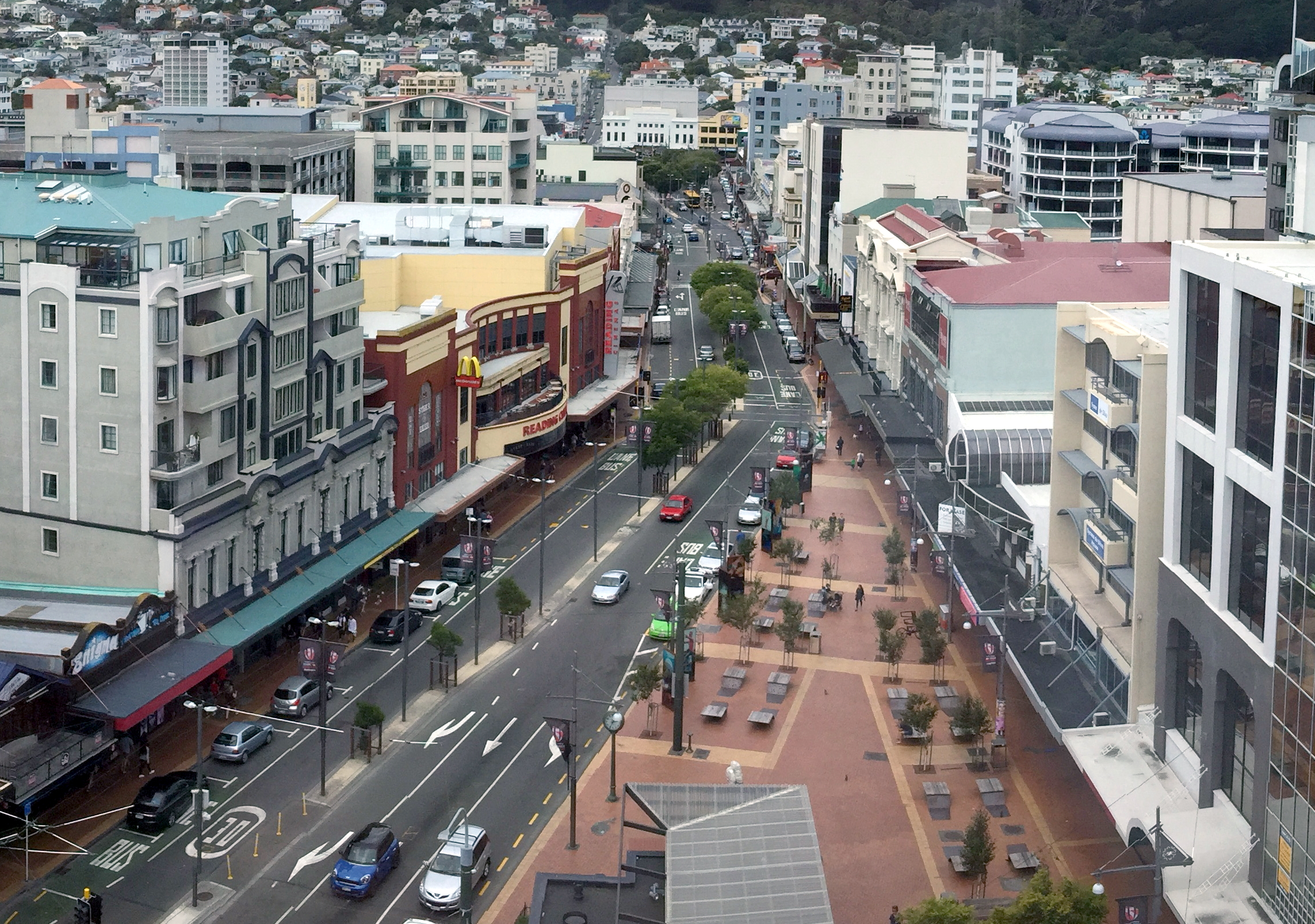
View of Courtenay Place looking back towards Mount Victoria

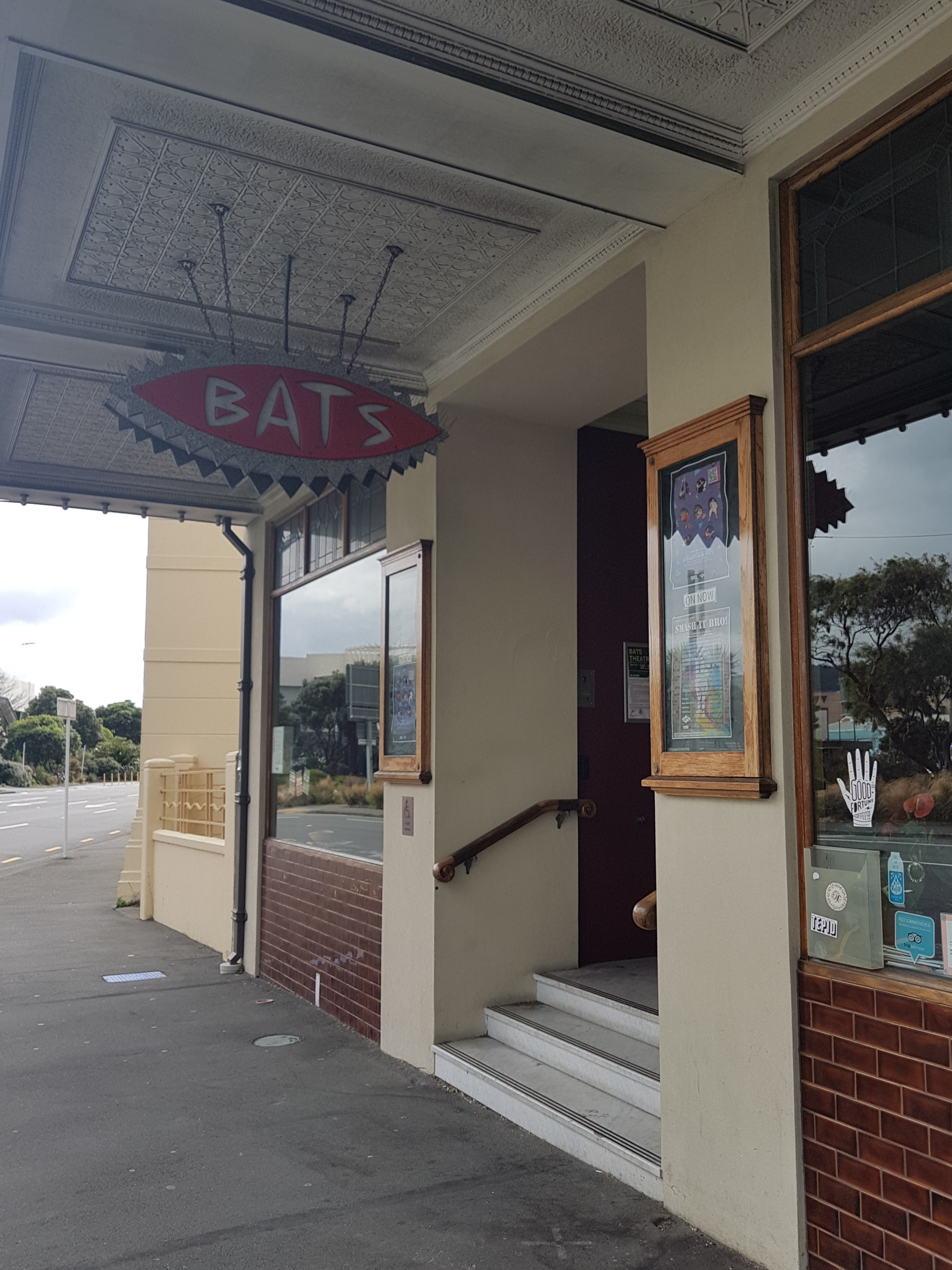
BATS Theatre (next door to fire station)
