= Raymond Boyce (theatre designer) =

New Zealand theatre designer (1928–2019)

Raymond Boyce MBE
- Born: 20 May 1928; London, United Kingdom
- Died: 1 August 2019 (aged 91); New Zealand
- Education: Slade School of Fine Art, Old Vic, Victoria University of Wellington (honorary Doctorate in Literature)
- Occupations: theatre opera and ballet designer and educator
- Known for: Theatre design and puppetry Including design at: Downstage Theatre; Royal New Zealand Ballet; New Zealand Opera; Teaching at: Toi Whakaari; New Zealand Theatre Federation Schools; Wellington Polytechnic; Victoria University of Wellington

Raymond Stanley Boyce MBE (20 May 1928 – 1 August 2019) was a British-New Zealand stage designer, costume designer and puppeteer and puppet designer. Boyce was part of the start professional theatre movement in New Zealand influencing the artistic landscape with his design knowledge. Boyce designed hundreds of theatre shows and was named an Arts Foundation of New Zealand Icon in 2007.

== Background and education ==
Raymond Boyce was born in London in 1928. He was interested in theatre from a young age and used to build mini stages with marionettes, and as a child joined the Model Theatre and Puppet Guild. Boyce studied at the Slade School of Fine Art, and the Old Vic Theatre School, where he learned theatre design. Before he went to Slade he was conscripted into the army and was there for two years.

An early job of his was as a puppeteer for the John Wright Marionette Theatre and while studying he designed for the University College Drama Society in London. The Head of Theatre Design at the Slade School of Fine art was Vladimir Polunin who had painted scenery for Sergi Diaghilev, and Boyce learned the Russian method of scene painting from him.

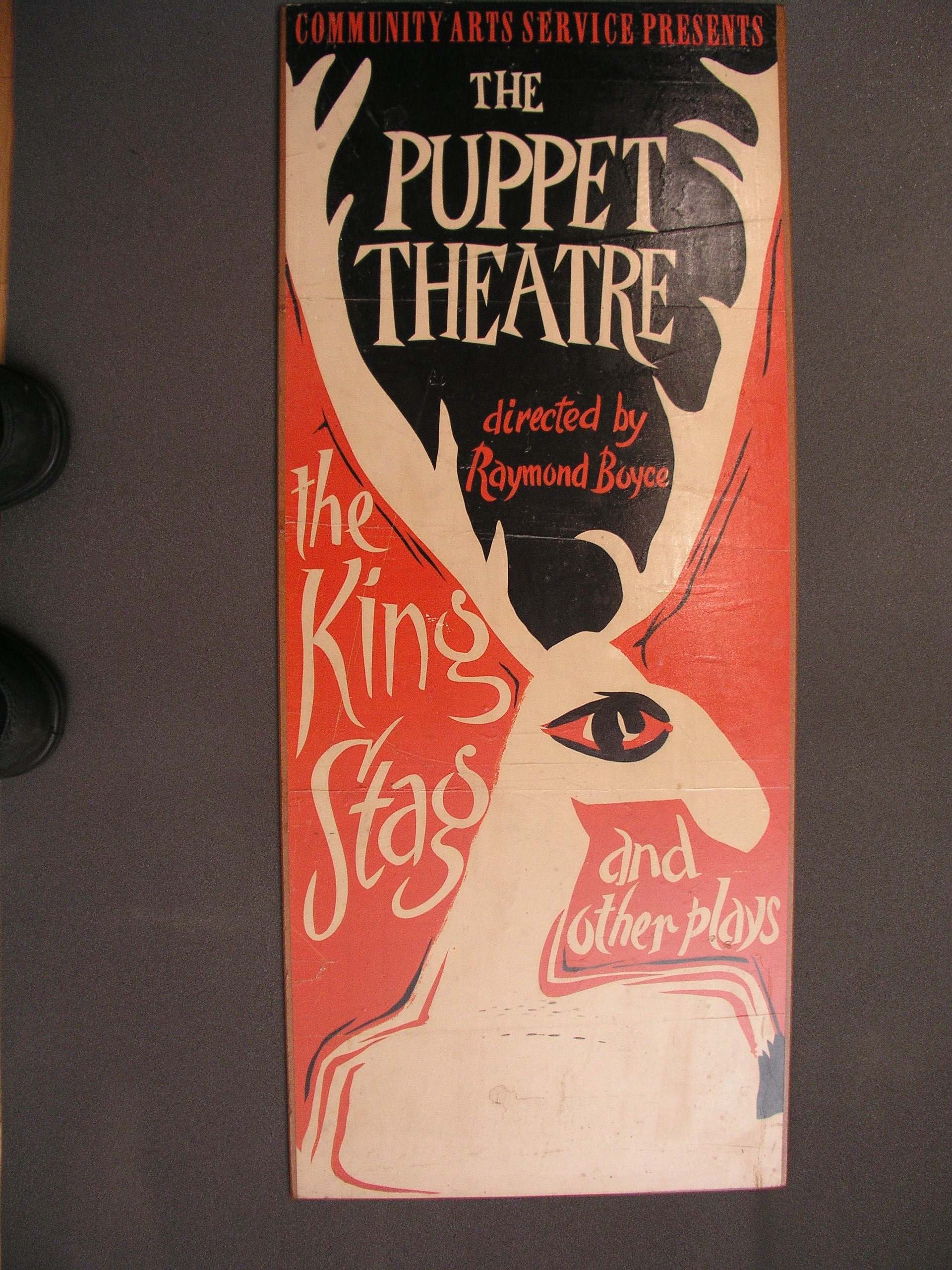
Poster advertising Raymond Boyce, Puppet Theatre. Image of stag in white, red and black. Mounted on wood. Collection of Auckland Museum Tamaki Paenga Hira, 1996.137.59

== Career ==
After completing his post-graduate course at the Old Vic under Michel St Denis, Boyce was appointed as Resident Designer at Dundee Repertory Company where he stayed from 1951 - 1953.

Richard Campion, who had been at the Old Vic, invited Boyce to New Zealand in the early 1950s to join the New Zealand Players as the company's resident designer and he took up the opportunity in 1953. Initially deciding to be in New Zealand for 18 months, he remained there for the rest of his life.

After leaving the New Zealand Players Boyce set up a touring puppet theatre in 1957. He then got jobs designing for New Zealand Opera under Donald Munro as the company was starting out, and the New Zealand Ballet Company, also in its early years.

Other companies he designed for include Australian Opera Company and Wellington City Opera. Boyce joined the Downstage Theatre Committee in 1966, and was the theatre consultant on the new building the Hannah Playhouse, that Downstage Theatre became resident in. Boyce went on to design many productions with Downstage and was involved in the theatre company in various capacities including being an associate director in 1979.

Peter Harcourt in his book summarising New Zealand theatre between 1920 and 1970 said of Raymond Boyce: "His work as a designer has been an integral part of the success of ballet and opera as well as drama".

Raymond Boyce taught students design from time to time including at Toi Whakaari, which held an exhibition of his designs in 2009. This exhibition was called Sculpting the Empty Space and was to 'celebrate his contribution to and his influence on theatre design'.

Former director of Toi Whakaari Robyn Payne knew Raymond Boyce since she was a child and has this tribute for him:

The word pou could not be more appropriate for Raymond. The designer envisages and sketches the whare, in which we all live and make our contributions. With his presence and his profound volume of work here since 1953 Raymond has hand-chiselled the house of professional theatre in Aotearoa, and he himself stands at its heart.

Asked about his process in an interview in 2016 Boyce said this:

In theatre design… I always did an in-depth study of the playwright, because unless I knew a playwright’s world, I wouldn’t really know what was in (their) mind.

== Notable designs ==
- 1956 Amahl and the Night Visitors New Zealand Opera. Designed in the round.
- 1970 Executive Designer of the New Zealand Pavilion in Expo 70 in Japan.
- 1975 As You Like It, William Shakespeare. Directed by Sunny Amey, the first production in the Hannah Playhouse
- 1991 Executive Designer for the New Zealand-made tapestry curtains presented to the Globe Theatre in London. They toured New Zealand first and then were handed over to the partially completed Globe Theatre in 1994.

== Honours and awards ==
- 1977 – Appointed Member of the Order of the British Empire, for services to the arts, in the 1977 Queen's Silver Jubilee and Birthday Honours
- 1990 – Honorary Doctorate of Literature from Victoria University of Wellington
- 1993 – Governor General's Art Award
- 1993 – Fellowship of the New Zealand Academy of Fine Arts
- 2007 – Arts Foundation Icon Award

== Exhibitions ==
- 2009 – Sculpting the Empty Space showcasing set models and drawings held at Toi Whakaari: NZ Drama School
