= Hannah Playhouse =

Theatre in Wellington, New Zealand

Coordinates: 41°17′37″S 174°47′01″E

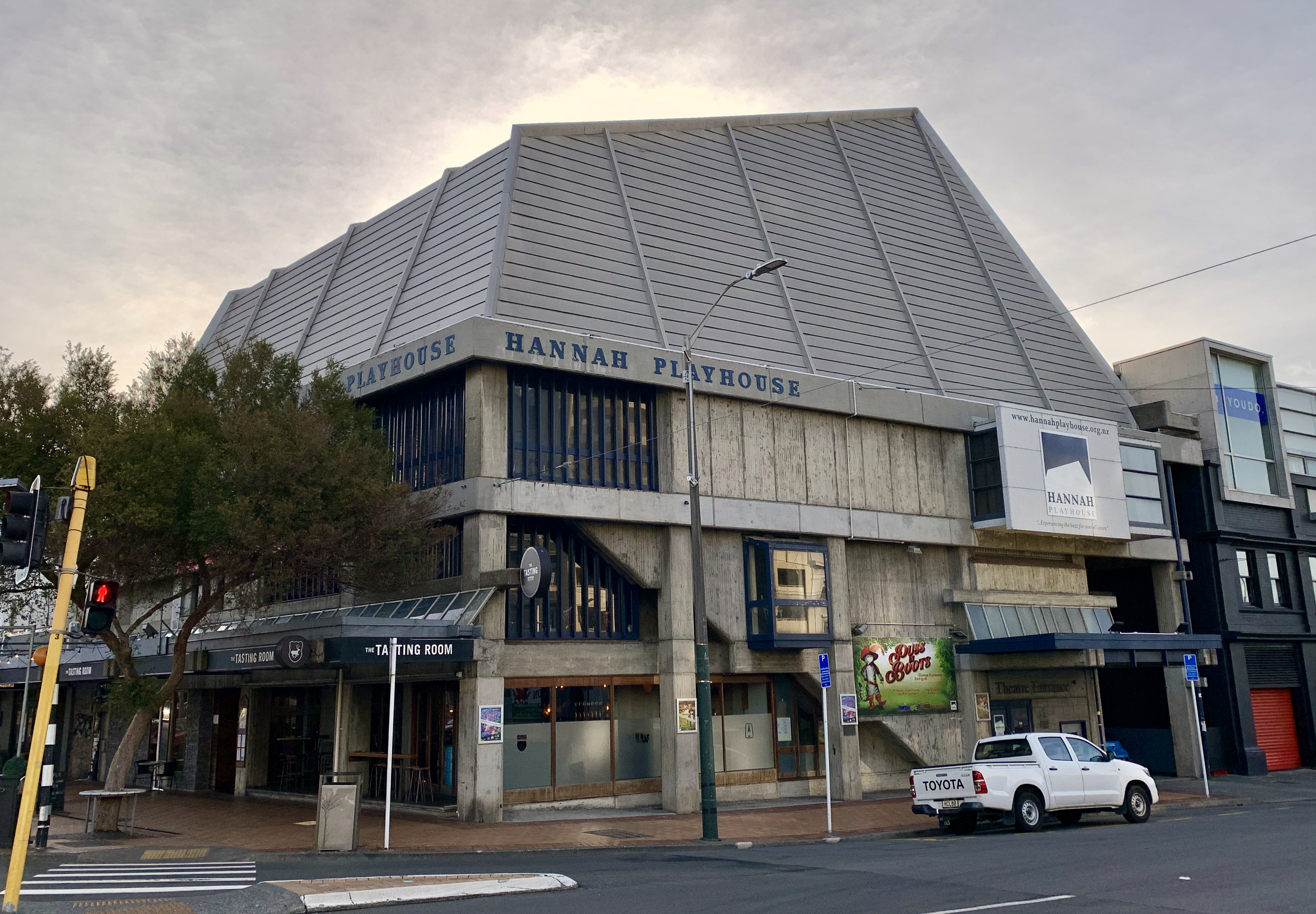
- Cambridge Terrace frontage, Courtenay Place to the left
- Interactive map of the Hannah Playhouse area

General information
- Location: 12 Cambridge Terrace, Wellington, New Zealand
- Completed: 1973
- Owner: Hannah Playhouse Trust

Design and construction
- Architect: James Beard
- Awards and prizes: 1978 New Zealand Architecture Award; 2006 Award for Enduring Architecture

The Hannah Playhouse is a theatre venue situated on the corner of Courtenay Place and Cambridge Terrace in central Wellington, New Zealand. The Hannah Playhouse was given by Sheilah Winn (first cousin of Edith Campion, mother of Jane Campion) and named after her grandfather, Robert Hannah, a very successful businessman. It was carefully designed and built to house Downstage Theatre.

== Background ==
Sheilah Winn (born Sheila Maureen Hannah, 1917–2001) announced in 1965 she would make a gift of NZ£150,000 (equivalent to NZ$7,430,000 in 2024). available to build a substantial theatre venue, named in honour of her Hannah family. Her grandfather Robert Hannah founded the R. Hannah & Co. shoemaking and retailing nationwide chain. The design for the Hannah Playhouse took place in the mid 1960s, initially designed by Ron Parker. He was followed by architect James Beard.

In 1968 the Hannah Playhouse Trust was formed to use Winn's gift to build the theatre venue on the site of the building containing Downstage Theatre at the tip of Mount Victoria on the corner of Courtenay Place and Cambridge Terrace. There were many delays in starting the project and galloping inflation meant additional funds had to be raised and, under the circumstances, Sheila Winn announced she was unwilling to provide them. Ultimately the Arts Council managed to cover the gap.

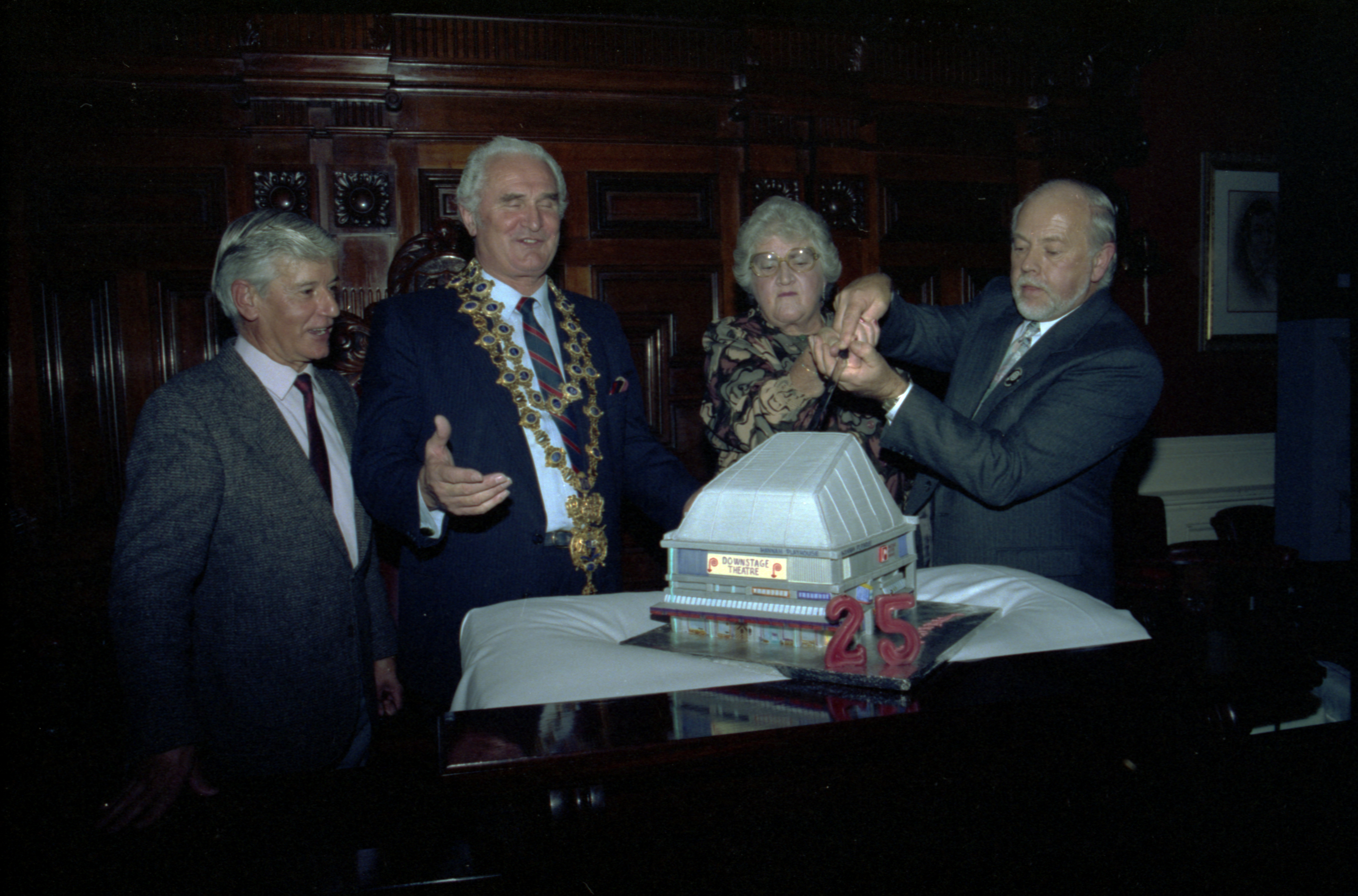
Downstage 25th anniversary

=== Location and design ===
The theatre was in the end built in 1973 and replaced the Downstage Theatre company's earlier premises upstairs on the same site. It diagonally faces and is within metres of Wellington's Embassy Theatre made famous by the world premiere of Peter Jackson's The Lord of the Rings: The Return of the King, in Majoribanks Street the Campion family business and over at the end of Roxburgh Street, for many years, "Monde Marie" the bijou coffee house of Mary Seddon, only daughter of Tom Seddon. BATS Theatre is on the opposing side of the main thoroughfare. The Hannah Playhouse building was home to Downstage until 2013 when Downstage closed. The building itself is still often referred to as Downstage Theatre.

Raymond Boyce MBE, London-trained at The Old Vic and brought to New Zealand by Richard Campion was a leading New Zealand theatre set and costume designer. He was on the board of Downstage when the playhouse was built. Boyce became design consultant to the architects influencing the design of the flexible stage area and auditorium. It was designed to be a dinner theatre with a flexible space that could accommodate an audience seated for dining, with options for the staging of the performance that could change for each show.

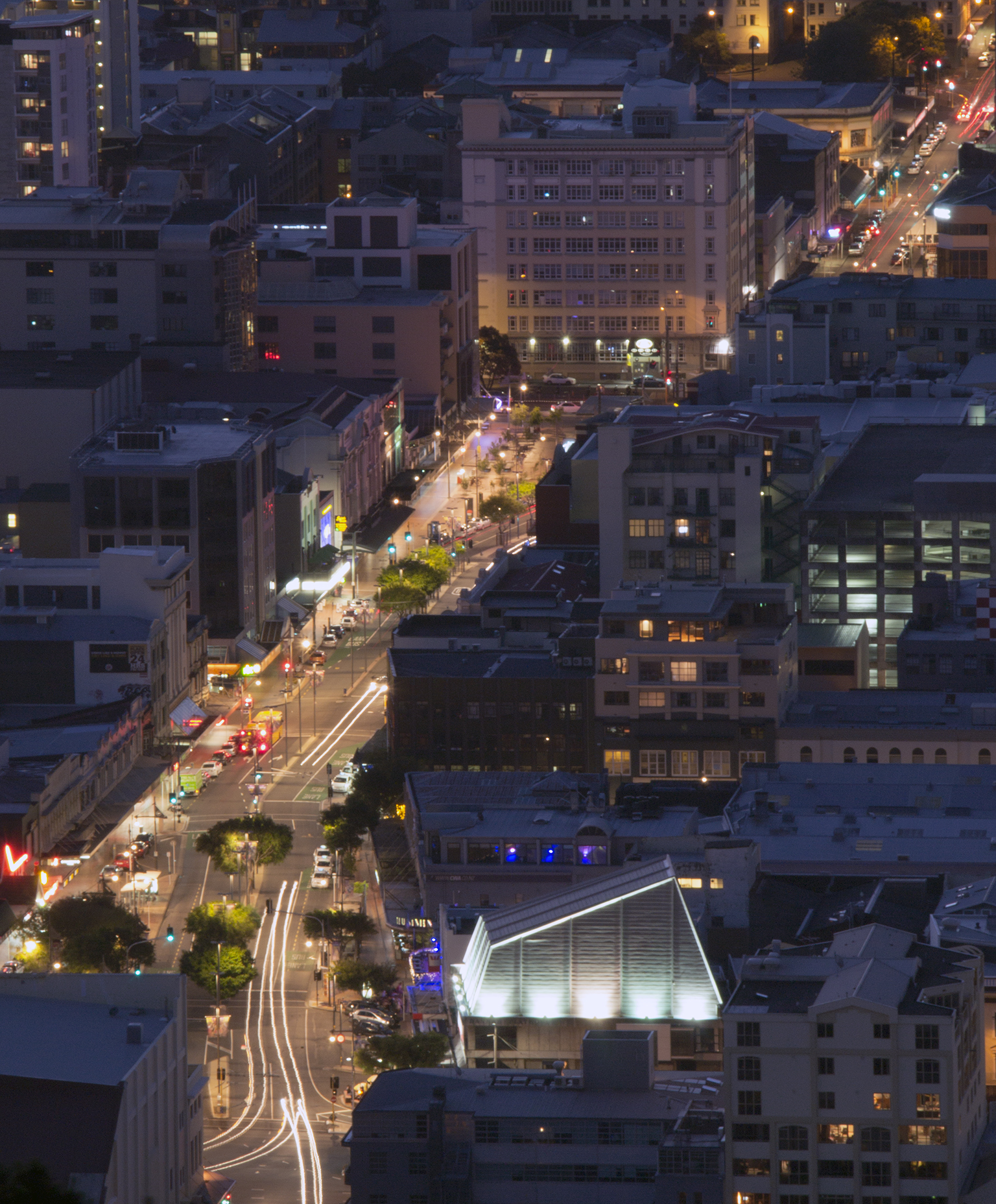
The Hannah Playhouse with the roof lit up in the foreground of this night time aerial shot of Wellington's Courtenay Place.

It currently seats approximately 250 people in the auditorium, when it opened it had a capacity for 170 people at dining tables.

=== Ownership ===
The Hannah Playhouse Trust has been obliged to sell almost a half share of the building to the Wellington City Council. The Council has taken full ownership of the nearby Embassy Theatre.

== Architectural significance ==
The design of the Hannah Playhouse is a building which sits in the 1960s 'brutalist' category which refers to the raw, undoctored concrete that features in both the exterior and interior of the building.

The building is part of a small group of unique performance spaces because of its asymmetric design, they include the Heinrich Tessenow's Hellerau Festpielhaus (1911) in Dresden, Germany, Manchester Royal Exchange (1976) in England, and São Paulo's Teatro Oficina (1984) in Brazil.

It featured in an exhibition about modern architecture in 2010 called Long Live the Modern at the Dowse Art Museum in Wellington, New Zealand. In the book that accompanied the exhibition the building is described thus:

"It asserts itself ... by adopting a sculptural, asymmetric roof form that addresses the corner site; and by taking its lead from brutalism's uncompromising, anti-bourgeois spirit, typified by the enthusiasm for unpainted off-form concrete." (Christine McCarthy)

=== Awards ===
- 1977 Tourism Design Award for meritorious design
- 1978 NZIA New Zealand Architecture Award
- 2006 NZIA Award for Enduring Architecture
