= Downstage Theatre =

Former theatre company in Wellington, New Zealand

Coordinates: 41°17′37″S 174°47′01″E

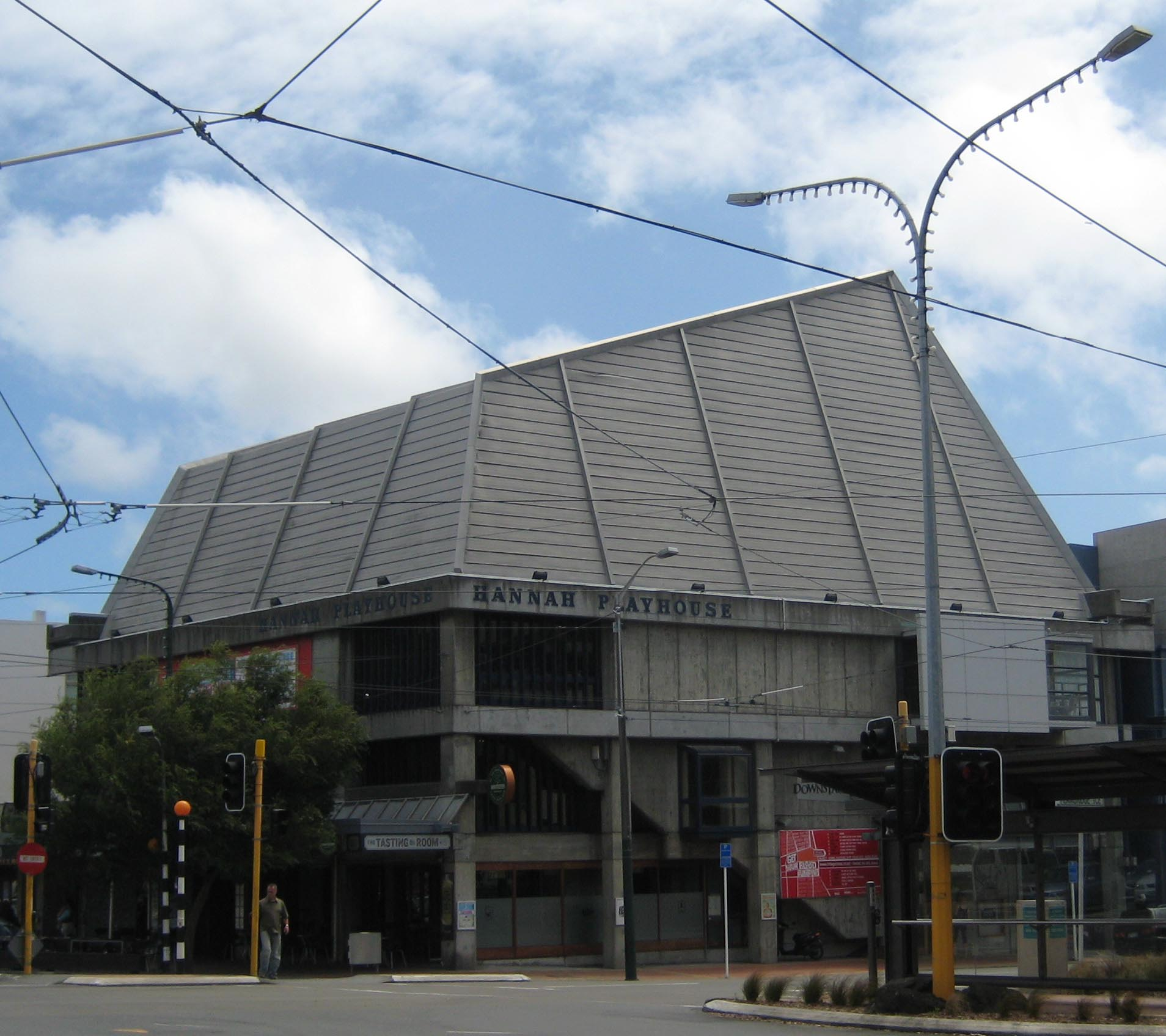
- Formation: 1964
- Dissolved: 2013
- Type: Theatre group
- Location: Wellington New Zealand

Downstage Theatre was a professional theatre company in Wellington, New Zealand, which ran from 1964 to 2013. For many years it occupied the purpose-built Hannah Playhouse building. Former directors include Sunny Amey, Mervyn Thompson, and Colin McColl.

== History ==
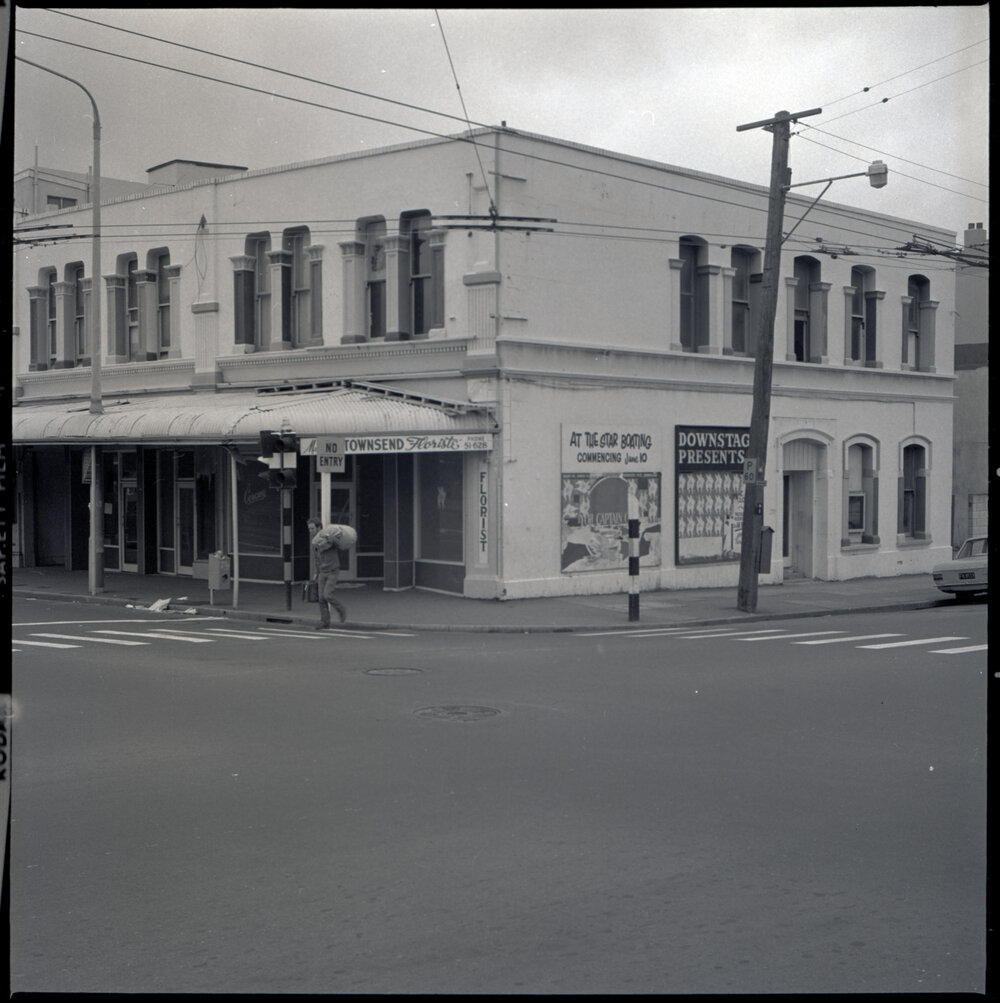
Old Downstage Theatre building, corner Courtenay Place and Cambridge Terrace, Wellington, New Zealand

The Downstage Theatre Company was established in 1964 as a professional theatre company. The founders at the inaugural meeting in the Wellington Public Library on 15 May 1964 were actors Peter Bland, Tim Eliott and Martyn Sanderson, and restaurateur Harry Seresin. Sanderson believed in a small professional company in Wellington performing challenging works in an intimate venue. Seresin owned the Walkabout coffee bar on the corner of Courtenay Place and Cambridge Terrace in Wellington, and the upper floor of the Walkabout is where the first Downstage Theatre productions were performed. Another founder was the Victoria University professor Donald McKenzie.

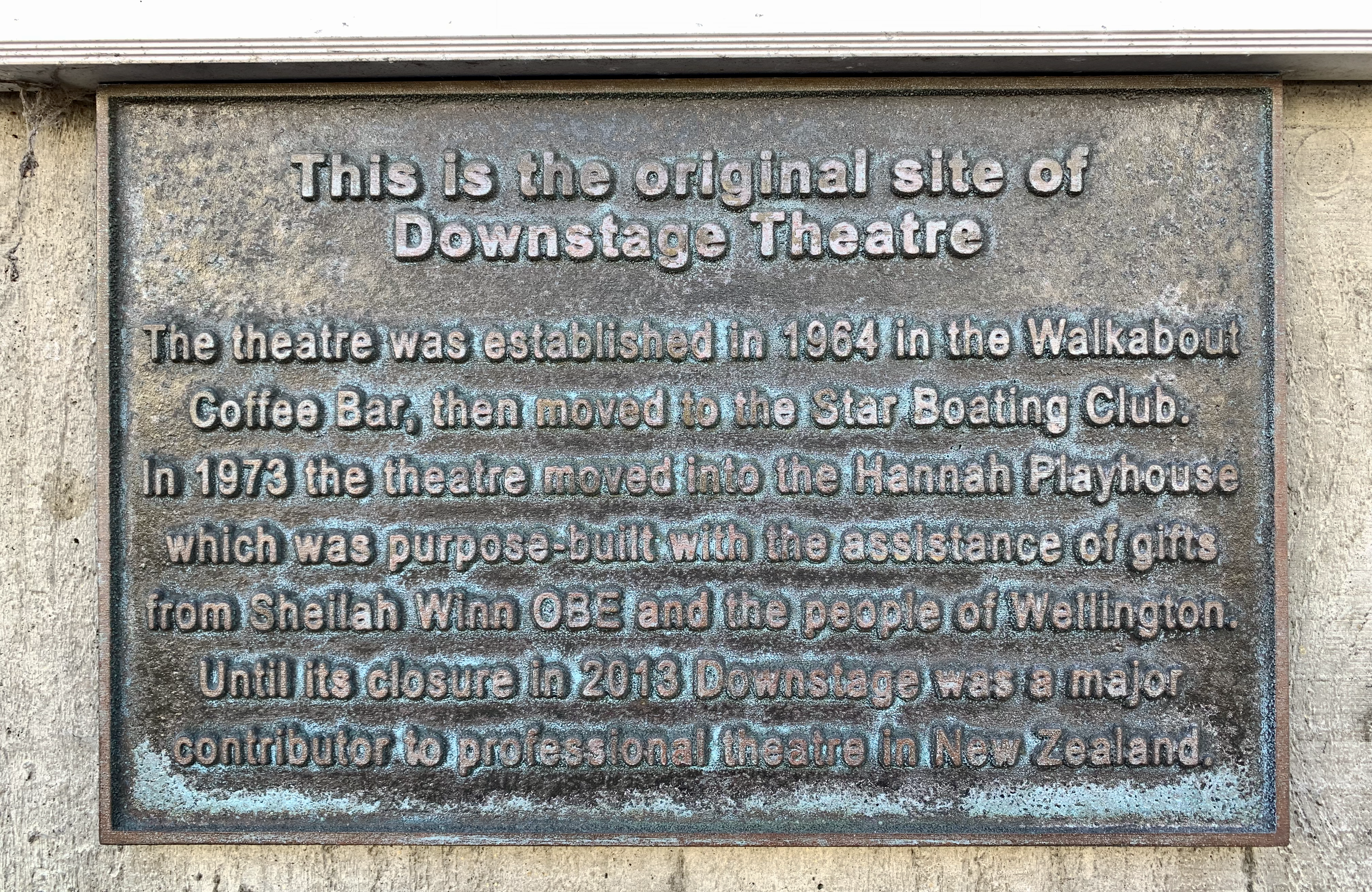
A plaque commemorating Downstage Theatre

In 1968 the company took over the whole upper story of the Walkabout coffee bar building with a remodeling that was designed by B. Woods as the major project in his final year at the Wellington School of Design. It was a theatre restaurant, where people dined and saw a show in the same space.

The Downstage Theatre Company continued to operate from the Walkabout coffee bar building until plans for a purpose-built theatre building were finalised. They moved to the Star Boating Club building in the early 1970s while the Hannah Playhouse was being built. Raymond Boyce MBE, a leading theatre set and costume designer, was on the board of Downstage when the playhouse was built. Boyce became design consultant to the architects Ron Parker and James Beard, influencing the design of the flexible stage area and auditorium.

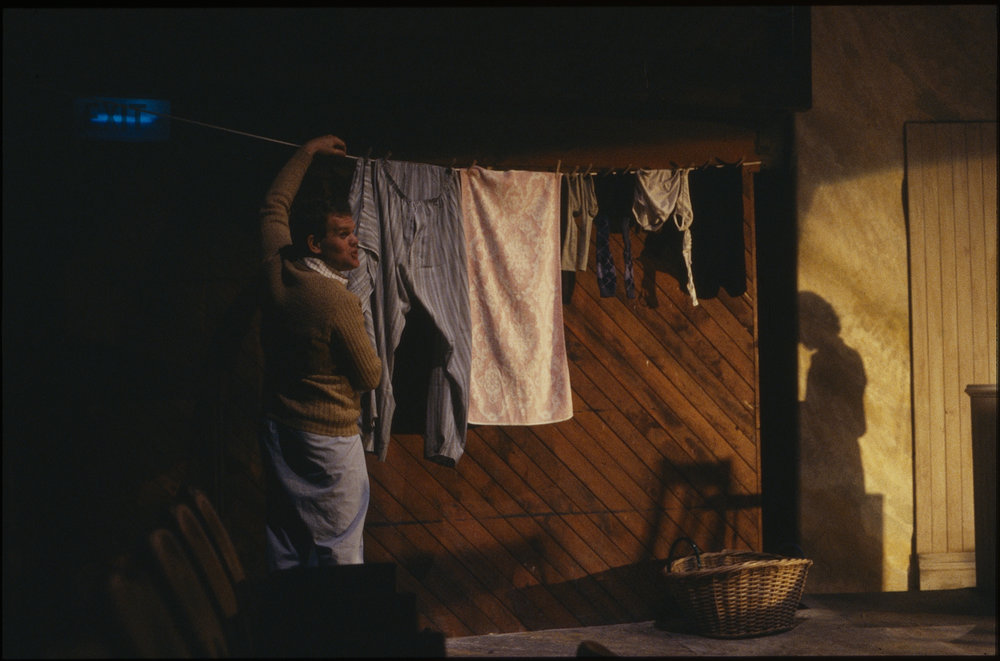
Mark Hadlow in "Gulls" at The Hannah Playhouse (1988)

The Hannah Playhouse (seating) approximately 250 people was completed in 1973.

Downstage published a quarterly magazine Act about theatre that included publishing play scripts. In 1973 Downstage supported the beginning of Playmarket, a New Zealand agency for playwrights, by allocating some staff time of Nonnita Rees plus office space. Act magazine continued, with Playmarket picking it up in 1975 after Downstage decided they could no longer fund this activity.

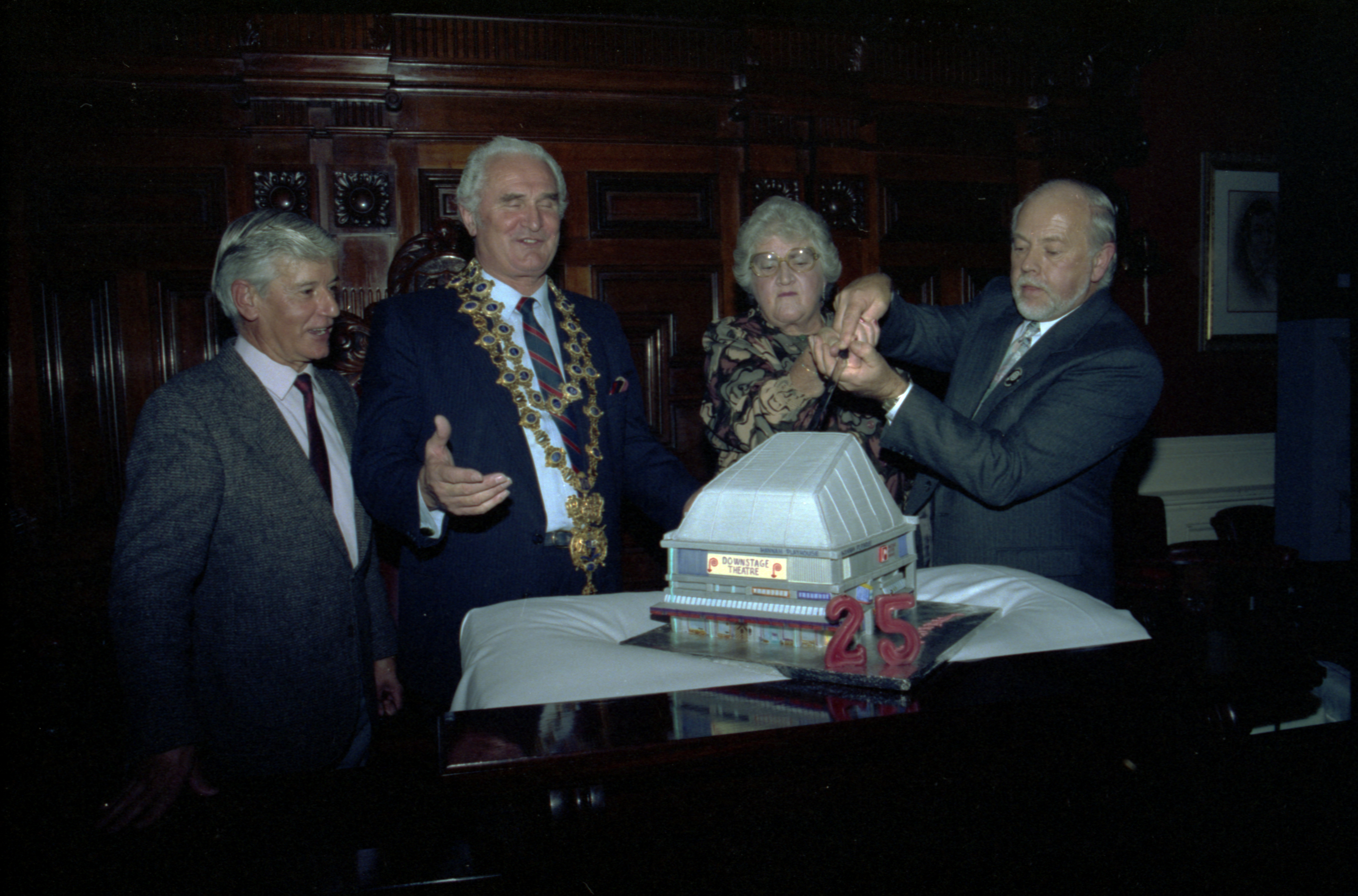
Downstage 25th anniversary

Downstage Theatre closed in 2013, citing a lack of adequate and stable funding.

== Notable productions ==
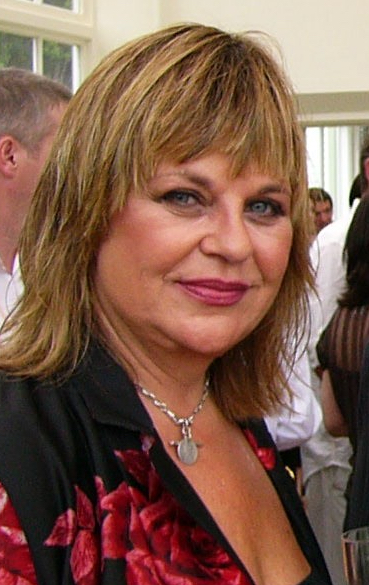
Ginette McDonald

The first locally-written production, in 1966, was Father's Day, a dark social comedy by Peter Bland starring Pat Evison as the eccentric mother with two pregnant daughters. It was directed by Brian Bell who directed TV drama for New Zealand Broadcasting (NZBC) and it was the first commissioned play for its own cafe theatre.

In 1968 a late night review called Knickers was the first place for Ginette McDonald's character Lyn of Tawa to have a public outing. Knickers also included Roger Hall, Steve Whitehouse, Cathy Downes and Paul Holmes.

The first play in the Hannah Playhouse was Shakespeare's As You Like It in 1973 directed by Sunny Amey who was the director of Downstage at the time. The set was in traverse designed by Raymond Boyce featuring a central sloping disc and the cast included Grant Tilley, Anne Flannery and Susan Wilson. One review stated "...more intelligently than we have ever seen it produced before."

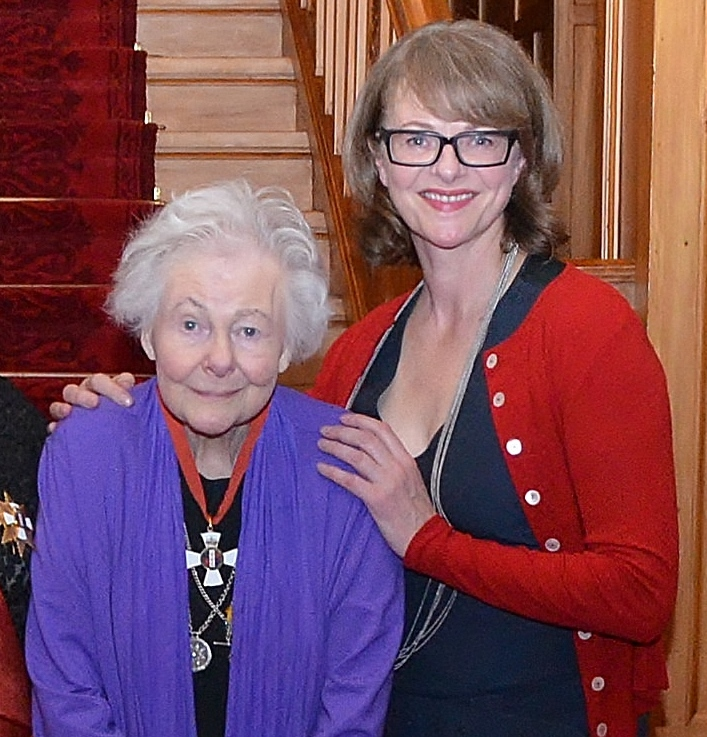
Kate Harcourt, Miranda Harcourt

Wednesday to Come by Renée in 1984, directed by George Webby, told a story of New Zealand's depression era through the lens of three generations of women. It was unique in the centring of women at the time. The cast included Jane Waddell, Dame Kate Harcourt and Davina Whitehouse. It was re-presented by Downstage in 2005 again featuring Jane Waddell and Dame Kate Harcourt this time also with Dame Kate's daughter, Miranda Harcourt, directed by Geraldine Brophy.

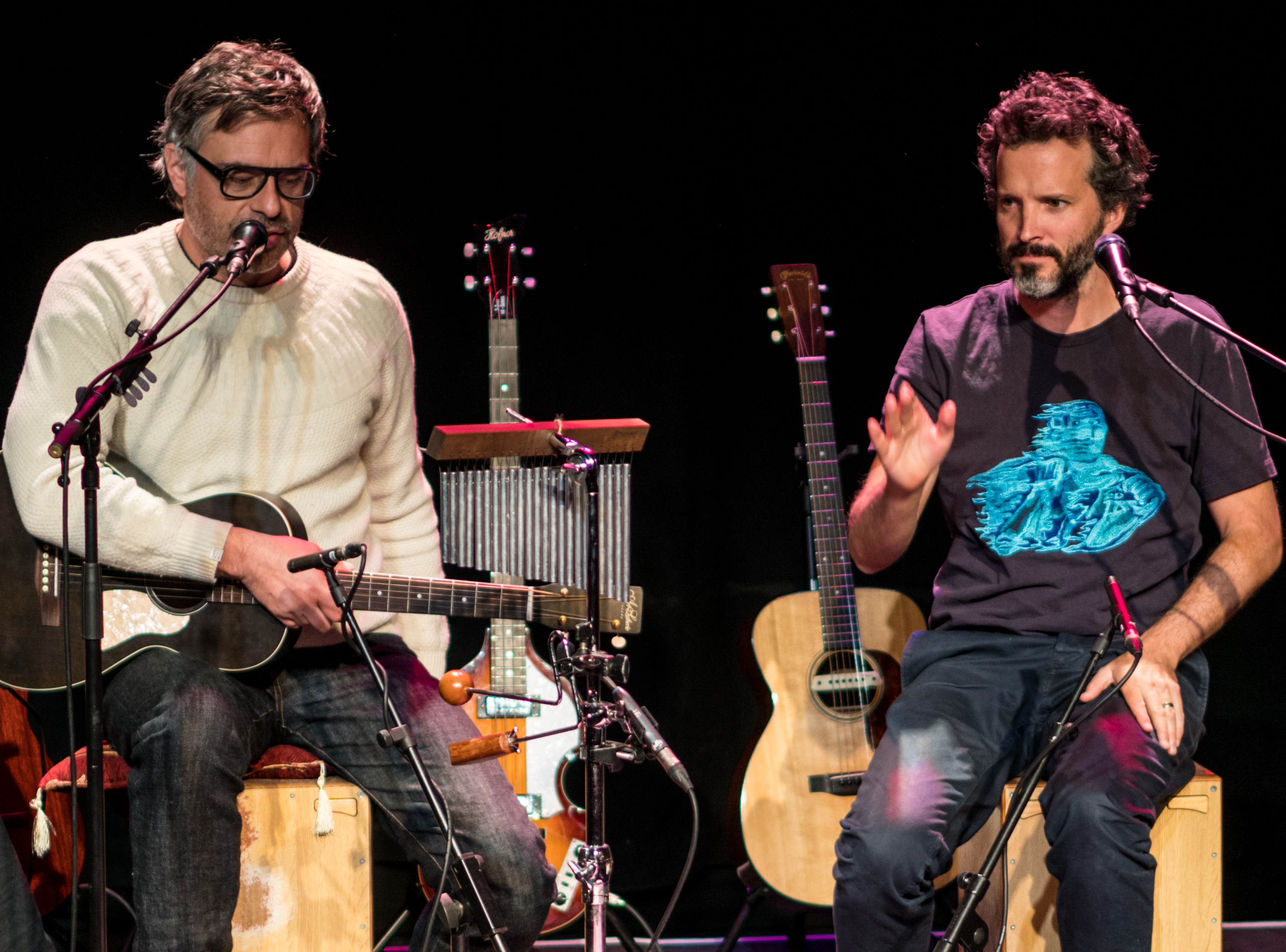
Flight Of The Conchords - Soho, London 2018

A number of plays started at BATS Theatre and then did shows at the Hannah Playhouse to accommodate demand and to reach a bigger and different Downstage audience. Well-known examples are Indian Ink's Krishnan’s Dairy, (BATS in 1997 and Downstage in 1998), Flight of the Conchords, who went on to play in much bigger international venues and also made a TV series in the USA (BATS in 2001 and Downstage in 2002), and an interactive production Apollo 13: Mission Control directed by Kip Chapman (BATS in 2008 and Downstage in 2010).

== Leadership ==
Founding artistic directors Martyn Sanderson, Tim Elliott, Peter Bland. The director position of Downstage Theatre has had a variety of forms and titles.

- 1964-66 Martyn Sanderson - executive director
- 1966 Tim Elliott - executive director
- 1967 Sandy Black - director
- 1968-70 Dick Johnstone - resident producer
- 1968-69 William Austin - artistic advisor
- 1970 Antony Goser - artistic advisor
- 1967-74 Sunny Amey - artistic director
- 1974-76 Mervyn Thompson - artistic director
- 1977-82 Anthony Taylor - artistic director
- 1982-84 John Banas- artistic director

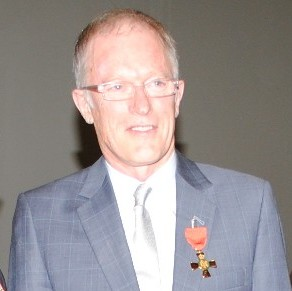
Colin McColl Director 1985 - 1992

- 1985-92 Colin McColl - artistic director
- 1992-94 William Walker - artistic director
- 1994-98 Guy Boyce - programme manager
- 1998-99 Ellie Smith - artistic director
- 2000-06 Murray Lynch - director
- 2006-2008 Cathy Downes - director
- 2008-2013 Hilary Beaton - director
