= Embassy Theatre, Wellington =

Cinema in Wellington, New Zealand

The Embassy Theatre
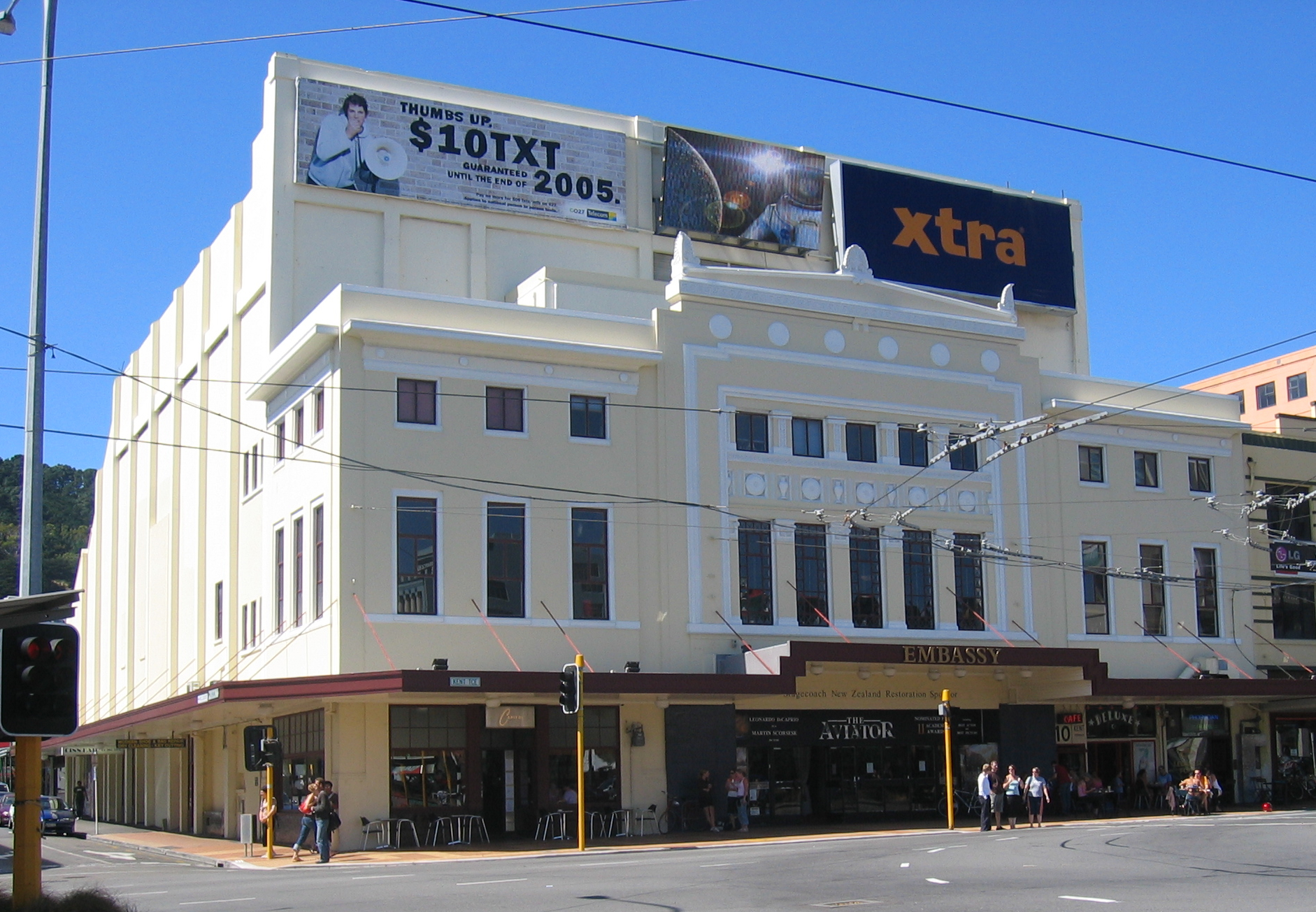
- The Embassy in 2005
- Former names: De Luxe Cinema

General information
- Type: Cinema
- Location: 9-11 Kent Terrace, Wellington, New Zealand
- Coordinates: 41°17′39″S 174°47′03″E
- Current tenants: Event Cinemas
- Completed: 31 October 1924
- Owner: Wellington City Council

Technical details
- Floor count: 4

Design and construction
- Architect: Llewelyn Williams
- Main contractor: A W. Williamson of Christchurch

Heritage New Zealand – Category 1
- Designated: 7 December 2001
- Reference no.: 7500

The Embassy Theatre is a cinema in Wellington, New Zealand, located at the eastern end of Courtenay Place in the shadow of Mount Victoria. Originally built in 1924, the building has undergone a series of remodellings and changes in ownership. It is currently owned by the Wellington City Council and temporarily administered by the Embassy Theatre Trust. Management rights were sold to SKYCITY Cinemas in October 2005, and is now part of AHL owned Event Cinemas. The building is recognised as a place of historical/cultural significance by Heritage New Zealand and is the only custom-built 1920s cinema still in use in New Zealand.

== Building history ==
Designed by Llewelyn Williams, the building opened on 31 October 1924, operated by De Luxe Theatres. In 1945, the original name of the theatre ("De Luxe") was changed to "The Embassy". Originally seating 1,749, remodels done during the 1960s - including installation of a 70 mm screen, proscenium, and false ceilings reduced seating to 852. Further remodels were undertaken in the early 2000s in advance of the world premiere screening of The Lord of the Rings: The Return of the King. The remodel was underwritten by a $4.5 million (NZD) grant provided by the Wellington City Council. Part of the condition of providing this funding was that ownership of the building be given to the council. In addition to strengthening the building against the city's many earthquakes, renovations also included an update to the interior to bring it more in keeping with the original theatre design.

== Building features ==
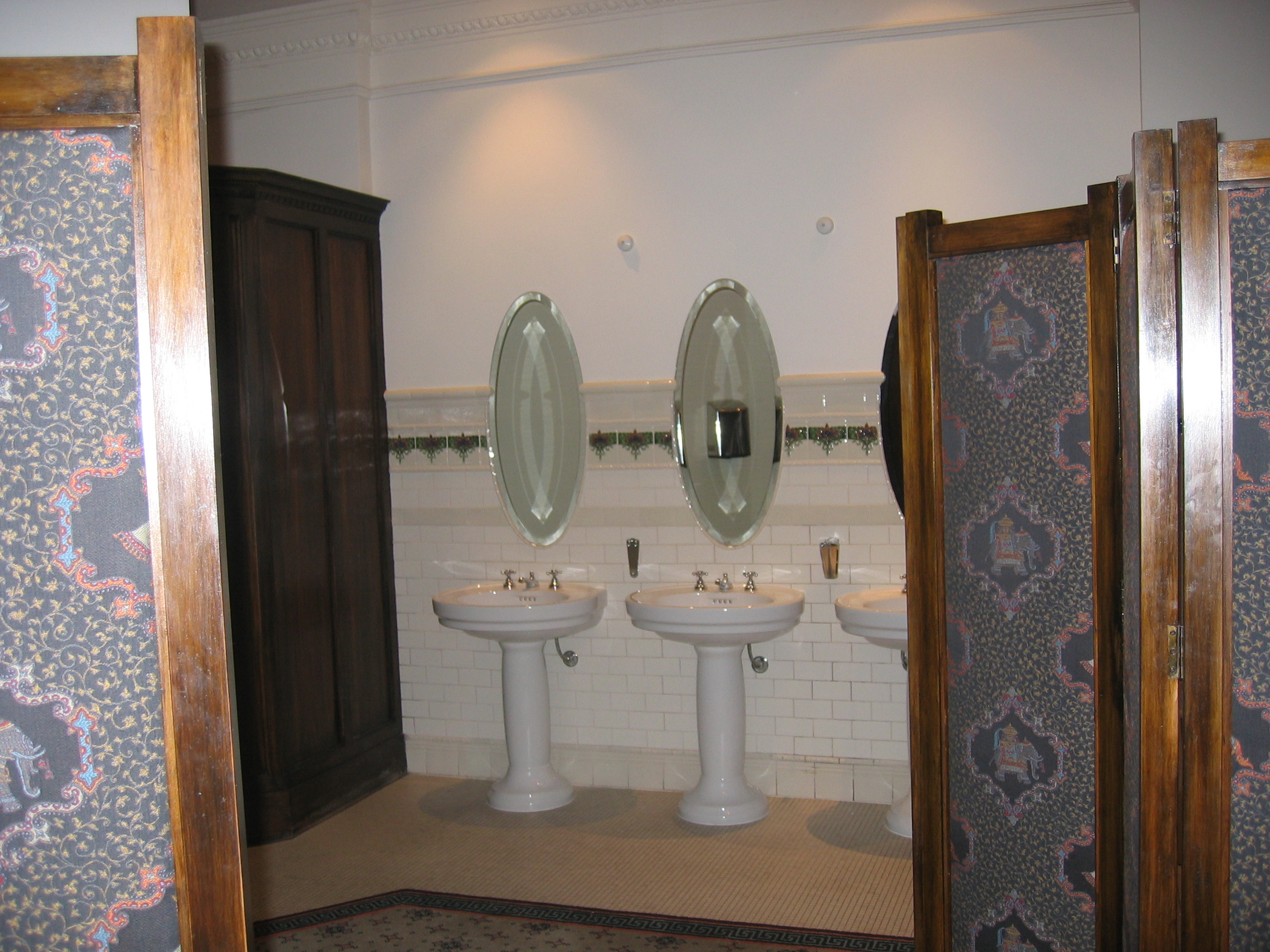
The bathrooms inside the Embassy Theatre

Designed in the classical style, the interior of the Embassy Theatre includes a marble staircase with brass fittings, tiled walls and floors, and dark wooden fixtures. Many of the furnishings reflect the overall style, which even carries into the design of the restrooms, which mirror the tiling with and dark wooden fixtures found elsewhere in the theatre. The theatre has three screens, the largest of which is thought to be one of the largest in the Southern Hemisphere. Other amenities include a snack bar and Blondini's Cafe and Jazz Lounge, which provides a wide selection of food and drink options in addition hosting live jazz music. The ground floor also contains the Black Sparrow cocktail bar and two smaller cinemas.

== Hosted world premieres ==
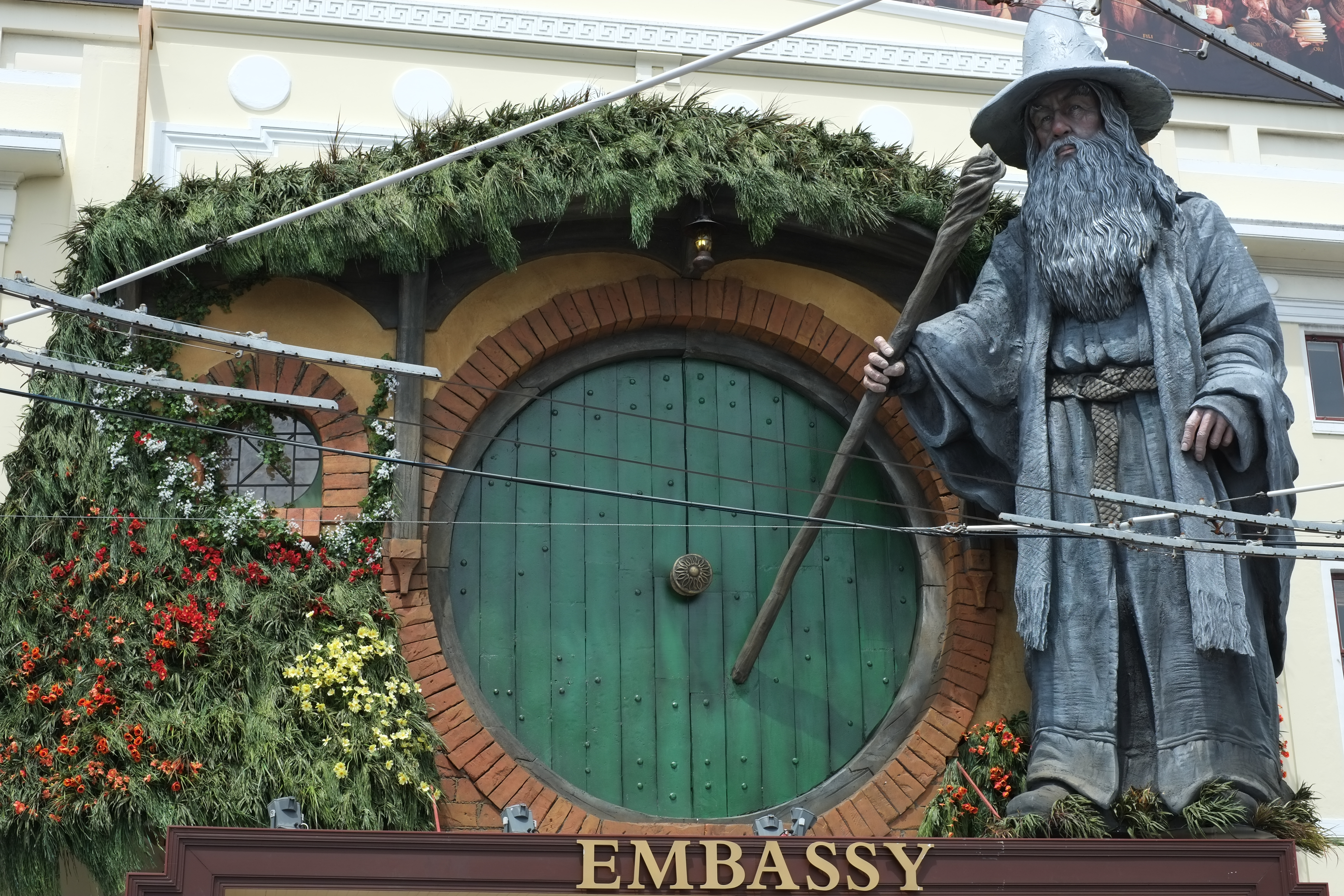
When the Theatre hosts film premieres, it is often adorned with film-related sculptures

The theatre was thrust into the international cinematic limelight when it hosted the world premiere of The Lord of the Rings: The Return of the King on 1 December 2003. Nearly 120,000 people lined the red carpet along Courtenay Place to watch the procession of actors and filmmakers as they made their way into the theatre for the screening. The theatre also hosted the Australasian premieres of The Fellowship of the Ring and The Two Towers.

The theatre held a red carpet screening of Peter Jackson's King Kong in 2005 and the 2012 world premiere of The Hobbit: An Unexpected Journey.

== Other events ==
The Embassy Theatre also takes part in the New Zealand International Arts Festival as well as the New Zealand International Film Festival.
