= YALLFest =

Annual young adult book festival in Charleston, South Carolina

YALLFest is a public two-day annual young adult book festival in Charleston, South Carolina that is the largest of its kind in the South. The festival was founded in 2011 by Jonathan Sanchez of the Charleston bookstore Blue Bicycle Books along with authors Kami Garcia and Margaret Stohl. Author Melissa de la Cruz joined as Director of Development in 2012. Margaret Stohl and Melissa de la Cruz currently co-chair the festival.

In 2015, Stohl and de la Cruz co-founded a sister festival, YALLWEST, that occurs every spring in Santa Monica, California.

== Attending authors ==
=== 2011 ===
Festival Director: Jonathan Sanchez

Author Track Guests:

Listed in Alphabetical Order by Authors Last Name
Kwame Alexander; Pseudonymous Bosch; Sarah Rees Brennan; Heather Brewer; Lisa Brown; Rosemary Clement-Moore; Andrea Cremer; Katie Crouch	Melissa de la Cruz; Kimberly Derting; Gayle Forman; Donna Freitas; Kami Garcia; Adele Griffin; Michelle Hodkin; Ellen Hopkins	Caitlin Kittredge; David Levithan; Isaac Marion; Saundra Mitchel; Kaleb Nation; Diana Peterfreund; Beth Revis	Marie Ruthoski; Carrie Ryan; Eliot Schrefer; Victoria Schwab; Holly Goldberg Sloan; Natalie Standiford; Margaret Stohl

=== 2012 ===
Festival Director: Jonathan Sanchez

YALLFest 2012 Keynote Conversation: Cassandra Clare and Holly Black

Author Track Guests:

Listed in Alphabetical Order by Authors Last Name
Kwame Alexander; Jennifer Lyn Barnes; Holly Black; Pseudonymous Bosch; Sarah Rees Brennan; Heather Brewer; Kiera Cass; Cinda Chima; Cassandra Clare; Andrea Cremer; Katie Crouch; Gitty Daneshvari	Melissa de la Cruz; Matt de la Peña; Kim Derting; Simone Elkeles; Elizabeth Eulberg; Gayle Forman; Kami Garcia; Adam Gidwitz; David Macinnis Gill; Adele Griffin; Deborah Harkness; Jenny Han	Siobhan Vivian; Michelle Hodkin; Ellen Hopkins; Tonya Hurley; Michele Jaffe; Caitlin Kittredge; Alyson Noel; David Levithan; Stephanie Perkins; Diana Peterfreund; Kathy Reichs; Brendan Reichs	Beth Revis; Jessica Rothenberg; Carrie Ryan; Eliot Schrefer; Natalie Standiford; Trenton Lee Stewart; Margaret Stohl; Cate Tiernan; Robin Wasserman; Marjorie Wentworth; John Corey Whaley; Kathryn Williams

=== 2013 ===
YALLFest 2013 brought together forty-eight top young adult, middle grade and crossover writers (including 25 New York Times Bestsellers) from all over the country.

Festival Director: Jonathan Sanchez

Programming Directors: Margaret Stohl (YA), Melissa de la Cruz (Crossover), Pseudonymous Bosch (Middle Grade)

YALLFest 2013 Keynote Conversation: Veronica Roth and Rae Carson (Presented by Epic Reads & HarperTeen)

Author Track Guests:

(NYT = New York Times Bestseller)
#	Author	Prominent work	Secondary prominent work
01.	Leigh Bardugo	Grisha trilogy NYT	
02.	Pseudonymous Bosch	The Secret Series	Write this Book NYT
03.	Alexandra Bracken	The Darkest Minds Trilogy	
04.	Libba Bray	The Diviners NYT	
05.	Heather Brewer	The Slayer Chronicles	Soulbound NYT
06.	Rae Carson	Fire and Thorns Trilogy	
07.	Cinda Chima	The Heir Chronicles NYT	
08.	Matthew Cody	Super	
09.	Rachel Cohn	BETA NYT	
10.	Ally Condie	Matched Trilogy #1 NYT	
11.	Jocelyn Davies	A Beautiful Dark Trilogy	
12.	Melissa de la Cruz	Witches of East End	Frozen NYT
13.	Daniel Ehrenhaft	Americapedia	
14.	Gayle Forman	If I Stay	Just One Year NYT
15.	Kami Garcia	Unbreakable	Dangerous Creatures #1 NYT
16.	Adam Gidwitz	A Tale Dark and Grim Trilogy NYT	
17.	David Macinnis Gill	Rising Sun	
18.	Lev Grossman	The Magicians Series NYT	
19.	Lisi Harrison	The Clique Series	Monster High #1 NYT
20.	Aaron Hartzler	Rapture Practice	
21.	Michelle Hodkin	Mara Dyer Series NYT	
22.	Nancy Holder	Buffy the Vampire Slayer	Teen Wolf NYT
23.	Ellen Hopkins	Crank Trilogy	Impulse Series NYT
24.	Mike Johnston	Frozen	
25.	Bill Konigsberg	Openly Straight	
26.	David Levithan	Two Boys Kissing NYT	
27.	C. Alexander London	Dog Tags Series	
28.	Marie Lu	The Legend Series NYT	
29.	C.J. Lyons	Broken NYT	
30.	Tahereh Mafi	Shatter Me Trilogy NYT	
31.	Myra McEntire	Hourglass Series	
32.	Lisa McMann	Wake Series	Crash NYT
33.	Barnabas Miller	7 Souls	
34.	Alyson Noel	The Immortal Series	Soul Seekers Series #1 NYT
35.	Lauren Oliver	Delirium Series	Panic NYT
36.	Stephanie Perkins	Lola and the Boy Next Door NYT	
37.	Aprilynne Pike	Wings Series	Earthbound #1 NYT
38.	Brendan Reichs	Virals Series NYT	
39.	Ransom Riggs	Miss Peregrine's Home for Peculiar Children #1 NYT	
40.	Veronica Rossi	Under the Never Sky Series NYT	
41.	Veronica Roth	Divergent Series #1 NYT	
42.	Rainbow Rowell	Fangirl NYT	
43.	Carrie Ryan	The Forest of Hands and Teeth Series NYT	
44.	Victoria Schwab	The Archived	Vicious
45.	Natalie Standiford	The Boy on the Bridge	
46.	Margaret Stohl	Icons	Dangerous Creatures #1 NYT
47.	Sean Williams	Twinmaker	
48.	J.E. Thompson	The Girl From Felony Bay	

=== 2014 ===
YALLFest Board of Directors: Festival Director: Jonathan Sanchez; Programming Committee: Pseudonymous Bosch; Melissa de la Cruz (Board Vice Chair); Kami Garcia; Margaret Stohl (Board Chair); Treasurer: Brendan Reichs; Librarian Liaison: Andria Amaral; Board Secretary, Festival Assistant: Emily Williams; Board Member: Patrick Dolan; Merchandise, Green Room: Stephanie Barna	Advisory Board: Richard Abate (3 Arts Entertainment); Jennifer Besser (Penguin Young Readers); Sarah Burnes (The Garnet Company); David Levithan (Author); Emily Meehan (Disney-Hyperion); Carrie Ryan (Author); David Stohl (Activision); Sally Willcox (Creative Arts Agency); Editorial Track Guests: Daniel Ehrenhaft – The Last Dog on Earth; Emily Meehan; Jocelyn Davies – A Beautiful Dark; Sarah Burnes; YALLFest 2014 Keynote Conversation: James Dashner and Sarah Zarr (Presented by Random House)

Author Track Guests:

#	Author	Prominent work	Secondary prominent work
01.	Kwame Alexander	The Crossover	
02.	Jennifer Armentrout	Don't Look Back	
03.	Leigh Bardugo	The Grisha Trilogy	
04.	Pseudonymous Bosch	The Secret Series	
05.	Alexandra Bracken	The Darkest Minds Series	
06.	Ann Brashares	The Sisterhood of the Traveling Pants	
07.	Libba Bray	Gemma Doyle Trilogy	
08.	Coe Booth	Bronxwood	Kinda Like Brothers
09.	Kiera Cass	The Selection Trilogy	
10.	Ally Condie	Matched Trilogy	
11.	James Dashner	The Maze Runner series	The Mortality Doctrine series
12.	John Parke Davis	Map to Everywhere	
13.	Melissa de la Cruz	Blue Bloods Series	The Ring and the Crown, and more
14.	Matt de la Peña	Mexican WhiteBoy	The Living
15.	Sarah Dessen	Along for the Ride	The Moon and More
16.	Jim di Bartolo	In the Shadows	
17.	Susan Ee	Penryn & the End of Days Series	
18.	Daniel Ehrenhaft	The Last Dog on Earth	
19.	Sarah Fine	Guards of the Shadowlands Series	
20.	Becca Fitzpatrick	Hush, Hush series	Black Ice
21.	Gayle Forman	If I Stay	Just One Day
22.	Kami Garcia	The Beautiful Creatures Series	The Legion Series
23.	Adam Gidwitz	A Tale Dark and Grim Series	
24.	Ryan Graudin	The Walled City	
25.	Adele Griffin	The Unfinished Life of Addison Stone	
26.	Nikki Grimes	Bronx Masquerade	Words with Wings
27.	Lev Grossman	The Magician's Land	
28.	Aaron Hartzler	Rapture Practice	
29.	Michelle Hodkin	Mara Dyer Series	
30.	Ellen Hopkins	Smoke	Crank
31.	Varian Johnson	The Great Greene Heist	
32.	Mike Johnston	Frozen Series	
33.	Christina Lauren	Sublime	
34.	David Levithan	Two Boys Kissing	
35.	E Lockhart	The Disreputable History of Frankie Landau-Banks	We Were Liars
36.	Alexander London	Proxy	
37.	Marie Lu	Legend Series	The Young Elites
38.	Sarah J. Maas	Throne of Glass Series	
39.	DJ MacHale	Sylo	
40.	Barnabas Miller	7 Souls	
41.	Lauren Myracle	Twelve	The Internet Girls Series
42.	Lauren Oliver	Delirium Series	Panic Rooms
43.	Danielle Paige	Dorothy Must Die Series	
44.	Stephanie Perkins	Anna and the French Kiss	Isla and the Happily Ever After
45.	Brendan Reichs	The Virals Series	
46.	Kathy Reichs	The Virals Series	The Temperance Brennan Series
47.	Morgan Rhodes	Falling Kingdoms	Rebel Spring
48.	Veronica Roth	Divergent Series	
49.	Rainbow Rowell	Eleanor & Park	Fangirl
50.	Carrie Ryan	The Forest of Hands and Teeth series	The Road to Everywhere
51.	Kieran Scott	Private & Privilege series	Only Everything, and more
52.	Jen E Smith	The Statistical Probability of Love at First Sight	The Geography of You and Me
53.	Natalie Standiford	How to Say Goodbye in Robot	Switched at Birthday
54.	Margaret Stohl	The Beautiful Creatures Series	Icons Series
55.	Laini Taylor	Daughter of Smoke and Bone Trilogy	
56.	J.E. Thompson	The Girl From Felony Bay	
57.	Maya Van Wagenen	Popular: Vintage Wisdom for the Modern Geek	
58.	Scott Westerfeld	Uglies	Leviathan Series
59.	Rita Williams-Garcia	One Crazy Summer	
60.	Sara Zarr	Story of a Girl	Roomies, and more

== See also ==
- Books in the United States
