= Caster Chronicles =

Novel series by Kami Garcia and Margaret Stohl

- Beautiful Creatures (2009); Beautiful Darkness (2010); Beautiful Chaos (2011); Beautiful Redemption (2012)
- Author: Kami Garcia; Margaret Stohl
- Country: United States
- Language: English
- Genre: Young Adult, Southern Gothic, Fantasy, Romance
- Publisher: Little, Brown and Company
- Published: 2009–2012
- Media type: Print, e-book, audiobook
- No. of books: 4
- Followed by: Dangerous Creatures

Caster Chronicles is a series of young adult fiction novels written by Kami Garcia and Margaret Stohl that were published in the United States by Little, Brown and Company. It comprises four novels that were published between 2009 and 2012. In 2014, it was followed by a second series set in the same universe, Dangerous Creatures. The series is told from the viewpoint of the teenage boy Ethan Wate.

== Synopsis ==
The series follows Ethan Wate, a 16-year-old boy that dreams of leaving his small South Carolina town for something larger. At the start of the series. he falls in love with Lena Duchannes, a new girl that is part of a secret section of people called Casters, who can work magic. The two find that there are several obstacles to their love, most notably the social and cultural differences between their two societies and the fact that Ethan cannot touch Lena for extended periods of time without suffering a severe electric shock. Throughout the series, Lena is troubled by the fact that she must claim herself as either a Light or Dark Caster on her 16th birthday and in the first novel manages to perform a spell that prevents her from having to make the choice. However, in the process, Ethan is mortally wounded, and Lena is forced to perform another spell to bring him back to life, which causes her to distance herself from him out of fear that he will be further harmed. Their relationship is further harmed by the introduction of Liv, a secondary love interest for Ethan who is also aware of the Caster world.

As the series progresses, Ethan finds that he is constantly haunted by a series of strange songs, and Lena is further tempted by various family members (including her mother and her cousin Ridley) to claim herself as a Dark Caster. Those ongoing problems pose serious threats to their romance but are ultimately unsuccessful as Ethan and Lena are inevitably and continually drawn to each other. The only true barrier to their love comes in the form of a prophecy that the "One Who Is Two" must be sacrificed to bring Order back to the world. Initially, they believe that to be Lena due to her dual Light/Dark nature, but they find that it actually refers to Ethan, as his resurrection was done too quickly, and part of his soul was left behind in the underworld. Knowing that is the only way to keep everyone he knows and loves safe, Ethan voluntarily throws himself off of the town's water tower to his death, and both parts of his soul are reunited.

In the underworld, Ethan finds that he still has limited communication with the living world and so manages to communicate with family members. He also discovers that he can come back to life but only through a difficult ordeal that requires him to remove his page from The Caster Chronicles, which is held by the Keepers at the Gates of the Far Keep. Ethan barely manages to succeed at this task and returns to the living world, where he is reunited with Lena. Although left with more questions than answers to everything, Ethan finds that he can now touch Lena without physical harm, which allows them to finally become a true couple.

== Novels ==
1. Beautiful Creatures (December 1, 2009)
2. Beautiful Darkness (October 12, 2010)
3. Beautiful Chaos (October 18, 2011)
4. Beautiful Redemption (October 23, 2012)

== Reception ==
Critical reception for the series has been largely positive, and the books were praised by multiple media outlets.

== Adaptations ==
There have been two adaptations of the work, the 2013 film Beautiful Creatures and a manga adaptation that was illustrated by Cassandra Jean.

=== Film ===
In 2013 Alcon Entertainment produced a movie version of the first novel, which was directed by Richard LaGravenese. The movie starred Alden Ehrenreich and Alice Englert as Ethan Wate and Lena Duchannes and was released on February 14, 2013. The film was a box-office bomb and a critical disappointment.

== Dangerous Creatures ==
In 2013 Garcia and Stohl announced that they had begun work on a new series set within the same universe as the Caster Chronicles. The series, which is entitled Dangerous Creatures, follows the relationship between Ethan's friend Link and his girlfriend Ridley, a Siren and Lena's cousin. The two authors launched the series on December 17, 2013 with the e-novella Dangerous Dream, and the first novel in the series was published on May 6, 2014.

=== Books ===
1. Dangerous Dream (Prequel, 2013)
2. Dangerous Creatures (2014)
3. Dangerous Deception (2015)

A group of short stories has also been published:

- The Mortal Heart (2015)
- The Seer's Spread (2015)
- Before the Claiming (2015)
- A Gatlin Wedding (2016)
