= Margaret Stohl =

American author

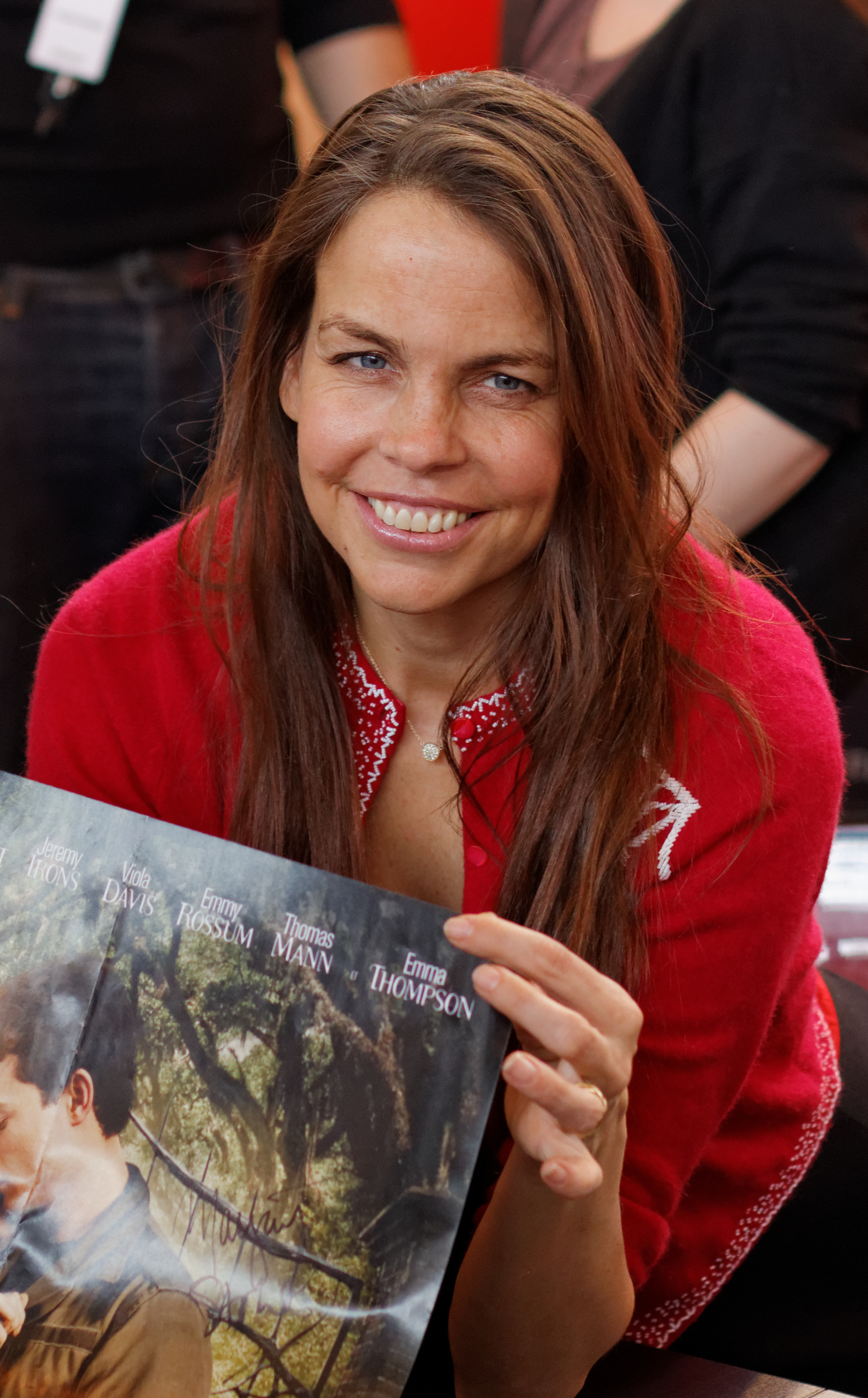
- Stohl at a 2013 book fair in Salon du Livre, Paris
- Education: Amherst College; Stanford University; Yale University
- Occupation: Writer
- Spouse: Lewis Peterson (former)
- Writing career
- Genres: Young adult, fantasy, romance
- Notable works: Beautiful Creatures; Mighty Captain Marvel
- Notable awards: Knox Prize for English Literature, Amherst College. (1989) William C. Morris Award, YALSA, ALA, Finalist, for Beautiful Creatures, with Kami Garcia. (2010) Most Innovative Game Design, Game Developers Conference Spotlight Award, Finalist, for Zork Grand Inquisitor. (1998)

Margaret Stohl (/stoʊl/) is an American writer. She is the author of 14 novels, as well as five volumes of comics and several video games.

== Early life and education ==
Margaret Stohl is a graduate of Amherst College, where she won the Knox Prize for English Literature, Stohl earned a master's degree in English from Stanford University and pursued, but did not complete, a doctorate in American Studies at Yale University. Stohl was a teaching assistant in Romantic Poetry at Stanford and in Film Studies at Yale. She attended the Creative Writing program of the University of East Anglia, where she was mentored by the Scottish poet George MacBeth.

== Writing career ==
=== Novels ===
Stohl is best known as the co-author, along with her friend Kami Garcia, of the "Caster Chronicles" book series, starting with Beautiful Creatures. The series, consisting of four books, two spin off books, and a novella collection, is generally classified as contemporary young adult fantasy, with particular interest for teens. It is set in the fictional small town of Gatlin, South Carolina in the Southern United States, and deals with a group of townspeople, friends, witches (called "Casters" in the books), and numerous other magical creatures.

Beautiful Creatures debuted on the New York Times Best Seller List and quickly became an international bestseller, published in 39 countries and translated into 28 languages. It was made into the 2013 film Beautiful Creatures, the cast of which included Alden Ehrenreich, Emmy Rossum, Alice Englert, Jeremy Irons, Emma Thompson, Viola Davis, Zoe Deutch, Rachel Brosnahan and Thomas Mann. The film adaptation was written and directed by Richard LaGravenese.

Her sci-fi duology the Icons Series is in development at Alcon Entertainment, the company behind the Beautiful Creatures feature film.

In April 2017, Stohl released her eleventh YA novel, Royce Rolls, a satirical look at Los Angeles' celebrity culture. The book was published by Disney's Freeform Press, and released with a trailer lampooning a reality television family.

In 2018 and 2019, Stohl collaborated with her former husband Lewis Peterson on her first two middle-grade novels, Cats Vs. Robots: This is War and Cats Vs. Robots: Now With Fleas. Both books were illustrated by their child, Kay Peterson, a student at Maryland Institute College of Art. In 2022, the first Cats vs. Robots was banned from elementary school libraries in Independence, Missouri for featuring a non-binary character. The ban drew an angry response from some parents.

Stohl subsequently released the Little Women re-telling Jo And Laurie, co-written with Melissa de la Cruz, in spring 2020.

=== Comics ===
In 2014, Stohl began to work with Sana Amanat of Marvel Comics and Emily Meehan of Marvel Press (a part of Disney Publishing) on a series of YA novels featuring the popular Marvel Avengers character Natasha Romanoff, the Black Widow. Black Widow Forever Red was a New York Times bestseller, and given generally favorable reviews, including an "A" rating by Entertainment Weekly. Black Widow Red Vengeance soon followed.

After writing two one-shots for Marvel Comics (based on a YA character invented for the novels, Ava Orlova, also known as the Red Widow) Stohl was asked to write the Mighty Captain Marvel comic in December 2016, followed by Generations, Legacy: Dark Origins, and Life of Captain Marvel. After G. Willow Wilson, Stohl became the second female creator ever invited to attend the Marvel Creative Summit.

Life of Captain Marvel, a retelling of Carol Danvers's origin story in advance of her debut in the Marvel Cinematic Universe (with artists Carlos Pacheco and Marguerite Sauvage) was well-received and well-reviewed. Three collected volumes of Stohl's Mighty Captain Marvel had previously been released as trade editions; Life was the fourth.

In 2019, Marvel announced that Stohl would be scripting a new Spider-Man: Noir series (with artist Juan Ferreyra) for a March 2020 release. Spider-Man Noir: Twilight in Babylon was released as a trade paperback in fall 2020.

On August 20, 2020, Stohl was the subject of the fifth episode of Marvel's Storyboards, filmed at the U.S.S. Intrepid in Manhattan, with Marvel Entertainment Chief Creative Officer, Joe Quesada.

=== Games ===
Stohl works in the video game industry. Notable writing credits include Activision's adventure games The Elk Moon Murder, Zork Nemesis and Zork: Grand Inquisitor (the latter as lead designer, for which she was nominated for "Most Innovative Game Design" at the Game Developers' Conference Spotlight Awards in 1998); Westwood Studios' real-time strategy titles Dune 2000, Command & Conquer: Red Alert Retaliation, Command & Conquer: Tiberian Sun; Infogrames' Slave Zero; Midway Games' Legion: The Legend of Excalibur and the 2002 Defender remake; Activision's Apocalypse and Fantastic Four. In 1999, Stohl co-founded the developer 7 Studios with her former husband Lewis Peterson; they ran the studio together until 2011, when 7 was acquired by Activision.

After taking a hiatus from the game industry to establish her career as a novelist, in 2017 Stohl began to work as a consulting writer for Activision Blizzard again, ultimately joining the game developer Bungie as a narrative director for Destiny 2. In July 2018, her twitter and instagram profiles listed her position as Bungie Incubation Narrative Director. Other game work includes the consulting company, Foundational IP Group.

== Book festivals ==
Stohl co-founded two literacy-based non-profits for teen and youth, the YALLFest book festival in Charleston, South Carolina in 2011 (with her former writing partner, Kami Garcia, as well as Jonathan Sanchez of Charleston's Blue Bicycle Books) and the YALLWest book festival in Santa Monica, California in 2014 (with author and friend, Melissa de la Cruz). As an outspoken LGBT advocate, Stohl is also a regional board member for Facing History & Ourselves, an organization dedicated to advocating empathy and eliminating bias (whether based on race, religion, gender or sexuality) in schools.

== Bibliography ==
=== Novels ===
The Beautiful Creatures Novels (contemporary fantasy series)

There are four books in the series, along with five additional e-novellas (also cowritten with Kami Garcia). They are often known to fans as "The Caster Chronicles."

1. Beautiful Creatures (2009) ISBN 978-0-316-23168-8
2. Beautiful Darkness (2010) ISBN 978-0-316-12917-6
3. Dream Dark (2011) e-novella only
4. Beautiful Chaos (2011) ISBN 978-0-316-19306-1
5. Beautiful Redemption (2012) ISBN 978-0-316-21460-5

The Dangerous Creatures Novels (contemporary fantasy series)

There are two books in the spin-off series (also cowritten with Kami Garcia) featuring popular characters from the original series.

1. Dangerous Dream (2013) e-novella only
2. Dangerous Creatures (2014) ISBN 978-0-316-37031-8
3. Dangerous Deception (2015) ISBN 978-0-316-38363-9

The Icons Series (dystopian sci-fi series)

There are two books in the series thus far.

1. Icons (2013) ISBN 9780316231992
2. Idols (2014) ISBN 9781306946971

Marvel's Black Widow Prose Novels (Marvel superhero series)

There are two books in the Black Widow YA series, thus far.

1. Black Widow: Forever Red (2015)
2. Black Widow: Red Vengeance (2016)

Royce Rolls (contemporary humor) (2017)

Cats vs Robots: This is War (2018) and Cats vs Robots: Now With Fleas (2019) (middle grade humor)

Jo and Laurie (2020) (historical romance, co-written with Melissa de la Cruz)

=== Comics ===
Spider-Man: Noir: Twilight in Babylon (2020) for Marvel Comics, edited by Devin Lewis, art by Juan Ferrerya. (limited series #1-5)

Batwoman/Supergirl: World's Finest Giant #1 (2019) for DC Comics, "Sister Sister," one shot, edited by Katie Kubert, art by Laura Braga. (anthology)

Life of Captain Marvel (2018) for Marvel Comics, edited by Sarah Brunstadt and Sana Amanat, art by Carlos Pacheco and Marguerite Sauvage. (limited series #1-5)

Mighty Captain Marvel (2016-2017) (ongoing) for Marvel Comics

- Issues #0-4, "Alien Nation," - edited by Sana Amanat, art by Ramon Rosanas; Issues #5-9, "Band of Sisters," - edited by Sana Amanat, art by Michele Bandini; "Generations: The Bravest; Captain Marvel & Captain Mar-Vell, Issue #1" - edited by Sana Amanat, art by Brent Schoonover; "Captain Marvel: Legacy #125-129;" - edited by Sana Amanat, art by Michele Bandini.
- Red Widow: The Last Opus (2016) one shot
- Red Widow: First Strike (2015) one shot
- Ms. Marvel: Ms. Grinch (2015) holiday one shot
