= Beautiful Creatures (novel) =

2009 American young adult novel

- Cover image for the novel
- Author: Kami Garcia; Margaret Stohl
- Language: English
- Series: Caster Chronicles
- Genre: Young adult, fantasy, romance
- Publisher: Little, Brown
- Publication date: December 1, 2009
- Publication place: United States
- Pages: 563
- ISBN: 978-0-316-04267-3
- Followed by: Beautiful Darkness

Beautiful Creatures is a 2009 American young adult novel written by authors Kami Garcia and Margaret Stohl and the first book in the Caster Chronicles series. The book was published on December 1, 2009 by Little, Brown, and Company. In the UK, Beautiful Creatures is published by Penguin Books.

The book was written in 12 weeks, inspired by a bet with seven children the authors knew, and was not originally intended to be published.

== Characters ==
- Ethan Lawson Wate is the 16-year-old narrator of the novel. He is a high school boy from the fictional town of Gatlin, South Carolina. Though he is not a Caster himself, he somehow has the ability to protect Lena from powerful magic and Dark Casters. He and Lena share a connection called Kelting, which lets them communicate telepathically even if they are miles away.
- Lena Duchannes is a Caster who appears in Ethan's dreams before she moves to Gatlin. She must be claimed for either Light or Dark on her 16th birthday.
- Sarafine Duchannes is Lena's mother and the strongest Dark Caster. She tries to convince Lena to become a Dark Caster.
- Macon Melchizedek Ravenwood is Lena's uncle. He is an incubus who chooses to live off dreams rather than blood. While characters in the book compare him to Boo Radley, he is described by the writers in an interview with Boys with Books, as an "Atticus Finch of badasses."
- Genevieve Duchannes was the Caster who caused the curse in Lena's family by trying to bring her dead fiancé, Ethan Carter Wate, back to life by using the Book of Moons. She was likely a Natural.
- Ethan Carter Wate was Genevieve's fiancé who died after he was shot during the great burning of Gatlin. Genevieve tried to bring him back to life by using the Book of Moons, which led to her turning Dark. However, Ethan was revived for only a few moments before he died again.
- Ridley Duchannes is Lena's cousin and a Dark Caster. She can manipulate people by using a lollipop.
- Mitchell Wate is Ethan's father, is a reclusive writer who is deep in mourning for his wife.
- Amarie "Amma" Treadeau is a Seer who is like a grandmother to Ethan. She can communicate with her dead family, which she calls the Greats. She is known throughout Gatlin for her culinary skill.
- Marian Ashcroft is the librarian of the Mortal and the Caster libraries. She was the best friend of Ethan's late mother, Lila Evers Wate, and has known Ethan since he was born. She greatly rues the fact that she cannot help Ethan when he is in danger because she is a Caster librarian and is bound by Caster rules.
- Hunting Phineas Ravenwood is a ruthless incubus who is Macon's brother. Unlike Macon, he feeds on blood, which gives him a more youthful appearance.
- Lila Evers Wate was Ethan's mother and died a year before the story took place. She was the best friend of the librarian Marian Ashcroft and is hinted to have had a previous relationship with Lena's uncle Macon in the past. She is later revisited by Macon when he is dying.

== Plot ==
16-year-old Ethan Wate lives in Gatlin, South Carolina, with his widowed and shut-in father, his superstitious aunt Amarie "Amma" Treadeau, who helped in raising him, and his best friend, Wesley Jefferson "Link" Lincoln. As his return to high school after the summer approaches, Ethan is subject to recurring nightmares, in which he desperately tries to save a mysterious girl. He quickly comes to meet this girl in the flesh: Lena Duchannes, a new arrival to Gatlin, and niece of the infamous town recluse Macon Ravenwood. Though she initially rebuffs his attempts at interacting with her, the pair eventually become friends, despite harassment from other classmates due to the town's distrust of strangers. This excessive hatred escalates until Lena is almost expelled, spearheaded by Link’s mother Mrs. Lincoln.

After many strange events, Lena reveals the truth to Ethan: she and her family are Casters, people who possess magical powers. On Lena's 16th birthday, she will be "claimed" as either a Light or Dark Caster without any choice in the matter, and is terrified of becoming Dark. Macon and Amma, who knows of the Caster world, both discourage the two of spending time together, but the two persist and eventually begin a relationship, despite Ethan suffering dangerous electric shocks when being too physical with her. Ethan also encounters Lena's estranged cousin Ridley, a Dark Caster and a Siren (able to manipulate others to do her will), who seduces Link to get close to the pair.

The pair discovers a locket at the Greenbrier plantation, which induces visions of their ancestors, Genevieve Duchannes and Ethan Carter Wate, who were engaged during the American Civil War. They discover that Genevieve tried to resurrect Ethan Carter Wate using the magical Book of Moons, after the latter was shot and killed by Union soldiers. Genevieve's use of the spell failed, and as payment, the Book of Moons cursed the Duchannes family by removing their choice to become Light and Dark, and deciding for them instead. Ethan and Lena find the Book in Genevieve's grave and study it for ways to prevent Lena from becoming Dark. Furthermore, Lena is continuously spiritually attacked by a Dark Caster, Sarafine, who is revealed to be her mother.

When Lena's birthday finally arrives, Ridley and Link organize a huge party for her, which turns out to be a trap to separate her and Ethan. Ethan is lured away by Ridley, who almost pushes his father to succumb to his depression and commit suicide, but relents due to her newfound compassion for Link. Ethan and Link wade through a Civil War battle reenactment to find Lena, but encounter Sarafine, who had possessed Mrs. Lincoln in order to stoke the town's hate against Lena. Sarafine reveals to the trio that Lena, unlike the rest of her family, has a choice: she can claim herself Light or Dark, but will kill all the Casters in her family of the opposite orientation when she does. They also learn that it is impossible for Casters and Mortals to be physically together, as the shocks would eventually kill Ethan.

During Sarafine's attempts to convince Lena to turn Dark, Macon arrives, but is forced to fight his brother Hunting, an Incubus like him, but who feeds on blood, while Macon chose to spend his life feeding on Mortal thoughts and dreams instead to avoid succumbing to his Dark nature. Ethan escapes, but is stabbed by Sarafine while searching for Lena, and falls to his death. Desperate, Lena unleashes her magic and makes the moon temporarily disappear, seemingly canceling her Claiming and postponing it for another year.

Lena and Amma find Ethan's body, and unable to let him go, use the Book of Moons as Genevieve did to bring him back to life. The spell succeeds, but exchanges Macon's life for Ethan's. Ethan wakes up, unable to remember what happens, and finds Lena grieving over her uncle. The pair mourn together, and the next day, Ethan finds Lena to have one green eye and one gold; respective marks of Light and Dark Casters.

== Reception ==
Kirkus Reviews writes that "Ethan's wry narrative voice will resonate with readers of John Green as well as the hordes of supernatural-romance fans looking for the next book to sink their teeth into." Booklist also positively reviewed the book, stating "there's plenty teens will like: romance, magic, hauntings, and the promise of more to come." The School Library Journal praised Beautiful Creatures's "detailed descriptions" and "satisfying conclusion" and noted that it would appeal to fans of True Blood. Publishers Weekly criticized the book's "protracted climax" but wrote that Beautiful Creatures had a "compelling and dimensional mythology." Despite its use of magic, the book is praised for its "authentic" characters and world. Linda Perez of the Journal of Adolescent & Adult Literacy states "Stohl writes clearly and lyrically," "the world they've created... is so believable that readers will find themselves unwittingly believing in magic". According to Ilene Cooper of Booklist "the 600 pages could have been cut to make a tight, better story."

On January 3, 2013, a new edition of the novel was published that featured images from the movie on the cover.

== Accolades ==
The series was named one of MTV News's "series to watch" in 2010.

== Adaptations ==
=== Film ===
Alcon Entertainment, with 3 Arts Entertainment and Belle Pictures, produced a 2013 movie version for Warner Bros that was adapted and directed by Richard LaGravenese, starring Alden Ehrenreich and Alice Englert as Ethan Wate and Lena Duchannes and Jeremy Irons, Viola Davis, Emma Thompson, and Emmy Rossum in supporting roles. The film was released on February 14, 2013. The film received mixed reviews and was a box office bomb.

Beautiful Creatures: The Official Illustrated Movie Companion by Mark Cotta Vaz, was published in the UK by Penguin Books on 2 January 2013, as a Puffin Paperback.

=== Comic book ===
Yen Press announced in 2012 it was adapting Beautiful Creatures into manga format with the artist Cassandra Jean.

=== Music ===
In 2016, Martin Mazanek wrote the symphonic poem Lena that was inspired by the book.

== Sequels ==
Beautiful Creatures was signed by Little, Brown, and Company for a four-book series, the Caster Chronicles. It had three sequels:

- Beautiful Darkness (2010)
- Beautiful Chaos (2011)
- Beautiful Redemption (2012)

== Bibliography ==
- Garcia, Kami; Stohl, Margaret (2009). Beautiful Creatures. New York: Little, Brown and company. p. 563. ISBN 9780316071284.
