= Beautiful Redemption =

Beautiful Redemption may refer to:

- Beautiful Redemption (album), a solo album by Chrissy Conway-Katina
- Beautiful Redemption (novel), a 2012 young adult novel by Kami Garcia and Margaret Stohl
