= Edith Campion =

Edith Campion may refer to:

- Édith Cresson, née Campion, French politician
- Edith Campion (actress), New Zealand actor, writer, and a co-founder of the New Zealand Players theatre company
