= New Zealand Players =

1950s New Zealand theatre company

The New Zealand Players were one of New Zealand's first professional theatre companies, active between 1952 and 1960. The company's director was Richard Campion, who with his wife and co-founder Edith Campion were former members of the New Zealand branch of the Unity Theatre people's theatre movement. Edith was a member of the Hannah family, and the company was funded by the Hannah Trust.

Other members of the company included Raymond Hawthorne, Nola Millar, Nyree Dawn Porter, Barbara Leake, Roy Bonnell, George Swan, Molly Parton, Rosalie Carey, Thane Bettany, Raymond Boyce and Louise Petherbridge.

== See also ==
- Southern Comedy Players
