= Ann Aguirre =

American author of speculative fiction

- Born: August 27, 1970 (age 56); United States
- Occupation: Novelist
- Spouse: Andres Aguirre
- Writing career
- Pen name: Ellen Connor, Ava Gray
- Genres: Urban fantasy, Romantic science fiction, Young adult fiction
- Notable work: Enclave
- Notable awards: RITA award – Young Adult Romance; 2012 Enclave; Top 10 Quick Picks for Reluctant Readers, YALSA Best of 2011, 2020 LITA Notable List
- Website: www.annaguirre.com

Ann Aguirre (born August 27, 1970) is an American author of speculative fiction. They write urban fantasy, romantic science fiction, apocalyptic paranormal romance (with co-author Carrie Lofty as Ellen Connor), paranormal romantic suspense (as Ava Gray), and post-apocalyptic dystopian young adult fiction.

== Personal life ==
Aguirre has a degree in English literature and lives in Mexico with her husband and children.

== Bibliography ==
In alphabetical order by series.

=== 2B Trilogy ===
New adult romance

1. I Want It That Way (2014, ISBN 9780373779833)
2. As Long As You Love Me (2014, ISBN 9780373779840)
3. The Shape of My Heart (2014, ISBN 9780373779857)

=== Apparatus Infernum ===
Steampunk noir as A.A. Aguirre, with Andres Aguirre

1. Bronze Gods (May 2013)
2. Silver Mirrors (May 2014)

=== Ars Numina Series ===
Paranormal romance

1. The Leopard King (2016, ISBN 9781537711904)
2. The Demon Prince (2017, ISBN 9781946085016)
3. The Wolf Lord (2018, ISBN 9781985392175)

=== Corine Solomon Series ===
Urban fantasy

1. Blue Diablo (2009, ISBN 978-0-451-46264-0)
2. Hell Fire (2010, ISBN 978-0-451-46324-1)
3. Shady Lady (2011, ISBN 978-0-451-46325-8)
4. Devil's Punch (2012, ISBN 978-0451464491)
5. Agave Kiss (2013, ISBN 9780451465030)
- "Forbidden Fruit" (2013, novella)

=== Dark Age Dawning Series ===
Apocalyptic romance with Carrie Lofty as Ellen Connor

1. Nightfall (2011, ISBN 978-0-425-24169-1)
2. Midnight (2011, ISBN 978-0-425-24299-5)
3. Daybreak (2011, ISBN 978-0-425-24340-4)

=== Dread Queen Series ===
Science fiction set in the Sirantha Jax Series universe

1. Perdition (2013, ISBN 9780425258118)
2. Havoc (2014, ISBN 9780425258125)
3. Breakout (2015, ISBN 9780425258163)

=== The Honors series ===
Young adult science fiction with Rachel Caine

1. Honor Among Thieves (2018, ISBN 978-0062570994)
2. Honor Bound (2019, ISBN 978-0062571021)
3. Honor Lost (2020, ISBN 978-0062571052)

=== The Immortal Game Trilogy ===
Paranormal YA

1. Mortal Danger (2014, ISBN 978-1-250-02464-0)
2. Public Enemies (2015, ISBN 9781250024640)
3. Infinite Risk (2016, ISBN 9781250024657)
- "The Girl in the Gray Sweatshirt" (2014, short story)

=== The Razorland Series ===
Young-adult fiction

1. Enclave (2011, ISBN 978-0-312-65008-7)
2. Outpost (September 4, 2012, ISBN 978-0312650094)
3. Horde (September 2013, ISBN 978-1250024633)
4. Vanguard (July 25, 2017 ISBN 9781250089823)
- "Foundation" (2012, short story)
- "Endurance" (2012, short story)
- "Restoration" (2013, short story)

=== Sirantha Jax Series ===
Science fiction

1. Grimspace (2008, ISBN 978-0-441-01599-3)
2. Wanderlust (2008, ISBN 978-0-441-01627-3)
3. Doubleblind (2009, ISBN 978-0-441-01781-2)
4. Killbox (2010, ISBN 978-0-441-01941-0)
5. Aftermath (2011, ISBN 978-0-441-02078-2)
6. Endgame (2012, ISBN 978-1937007744)

=== The Skin Series ===
Paranormal romantic suspense as Ava Gray

1. Skin Game (2009, ISBN 978-0-425-23153-1)
2. Skin Tight (2010, ISBN 978-0-425-23516-4)
3. Skin Heat (2011, ISBN 978-0-425-23920-9)
4. Skin Dive (2011, ISBN 978-0-425-24214-8)

=== Other novels ===
- Stone Maiden (2009, BoD and Free PDF Download under Creative Commons Attribution-Noncommercial-No Derivative Works 3.0 United States License)
- Thistle & Thorne (February 2013)
- The Queen of Bright and Shiny Things (2015, ISBN 9781250047502)
- Like Never and Always (2018, ISBN 9780765397584)
- Heartwood Box (2019, ISBN 9780765397645)

=== Anthologies ===
- Primal (2011, ISBN 978-0425239056), as Ava Gray with Lora Leigh, Michelle Rowen and Jory Strong
- 'Til the World Ends (2013, ISBN 978-0373803491), with Julie Kagawa and Karen Duvall
- Fierce Reads: Kisses and Curses (2015, ISBN 9781250060532), ed. Lauren Burniac

=== Short fiction ===
- Circle Unbroken (2009)
- Princes of Dominion (2010)
- Skin & Bone (2011)
- Wild Magic (2011)
- Endurance (2012)

== Awards and reception ==
Awards for Ann Aguire
Year	Nominated work	Category	Award	Result	Notes	Ref.
2012	Enclave	Young Adult Romance	Romance Writers of America RITA Award	Won		
