= The Seven Realms =

High fantasy series written by Cinda Williams Chima

The Seven Realms is a series of four novels written by the American author Cinda Williams Chima. The series genre is high fantasy, set in the Queendom of the Fells - a traditional fantasy world of medieval technology, swordplay, castles, and keeps. Han Alister, a thief-turned-wizard, joins forces with Princess Raisa ana'Marianna to defend her right to the Gray Wolf Throne. The action takes place in and around The Seven Realms, which are seven loosely related areas that were once ruled by the Gray Wolf Queens and their wizard consorts, or kings.

The Seven Realms include the mountainous Queendom of the Fells, the Kingdom of Tamron, the Kingdom of Arden, the southern Kingdoms of Bruinswallow and We’enhaven, the Southern Islands, and the Northern Islands. The four books in the current series are: The Demon King, The Exiled Queen, The Gray Wolf Throne, and The Crimson Crown.

A sequel series titled The Shattered Realms began publication in 2016. Set a generation after The Seven Realms, the books are set in the same world, following the progeny of many of the characters in the original series. The four books in this series are Flamecaster, Shadowcaster, Stormcaster, and Deathcaster.

== Synopsis ==
16-year-old Han Alister encounters three underage wizards setting fire to the sacred mountain of Hanalea. Han is unaware that this will lead to a series of events that threaten to consume the world in chaos. Han makes the wizard Micah hand over the magical amulet he is using. Later Han learns that the amulet has a dark history: it once belonged to the Demon King, an evil sorcerer who almost destroyed the world a millennium ago. Now, the wizards will stop at nothing to get their amulet back.

Meanwhile, Princess Raisa ana’Marianna, heir to the Gray Wolf throne of the Fells, has her own battles to fight. After spending three years of freedom with her father's family at Demonai Camp, riding, hunting, and working at the famous Clan markets, she must readjust to Court life in Fellsmarch. While she fends off an arranged marriage to Micah Bayard, the power of the Wizard Council is growing, and her people are starving and rebellious.

Even though Han and Raisa come from different backgrounds, they wind up in a race to keep balance in the Queendom and to save Fellsmarch.

== Series ==
- The Demon King
- The Exiled Queen
- The Gray Wolf Throne
- The Crimson Crown

== Main characters ==
=== Hanson Alister ===
Hanson Alister, Han for short, is the first main character that the reader meets. He is presented as the tragic hero and the dangerous charmer throughout the series, going by various names. In his early life as a gang leader, he went by Cuffs Alister (referring to a permanent pair of silver handcuffs he has worn since birth, which became his gang trademark). His clan name is Hunts Alone and spends every summer in Marisa Pines.

Growing up, Alister led a gang known as the Raggers, which he abandoned for his younger sister's safety. Alister tells his mother that he wishes to start a life making an honest living. This would normally take him to the clans in the Spirit Mountains, where he learned hunting, botany and other fresh-air trades. He also acted as delivery boy for the mysterious Lucius Frowsley. Alister is now sixteen and comes across the wizard Micah Bayar and his cousins, while hunting with his clan brother, Fire Dancer. The other boys are wizards, who have started a magical forest fire (supposedly so that Princess Raisa and her mother can hunt upland deer). After a standoff, Alister takes Micah's magic amulet, sparking a series of events that include Alister being accused of murders, kidnapping a disguised Princess Raisa and accidentally causing the death of his sister and mother after a standoff with Lord Bayar, Micah Bayar's father. Taking refuge again with the Spirit clans, Alister learns that he is actually the descendant of the villainous Demon King. Alister finds out he is actually a wizard himself (his silver cuffs have drained his natural magic since birth). Alister agrees to travel with Fire Dancer to Oden's Ford wizard university, Mystwerk, where he will learn wizardry. This will lead him to champion the clans against wizards led by the Bayars. Han's amulet is a relic of the Breaking which once belonged to the Demon King. A mysterious man, known as Crow, is sealed inside the amulet and he teaches Han ancient magic.

Alister is described as a handsome young man with a scar near his right eye and a large personality. This resulted in several flirtations with females throughout the series. The silver cuff once worn around his wrists are magical restraints put on when he was a child. Since the beginning of his education, his appearance has changed to that of a bluebloods, or the people of the castle close, changing clothes, style and personality in order to fit in with the other bluebloods at Odens Ford. It has been said that Han has a face for different situations. He has a face of the former thief who isn't afraid of violence, then he can swiftly change to a charming young man that wins the hearts of women.

=== Raisa ana'Marianna ===
Raisa ana'Marianna, also known as Rebecca Morley, Briar Rose, or Brianna Trailwalker, is the princess heir of the Fells. She is known to be stubborn, headstrong, and ill tempered but has a kind heart. She is shown to believe in justice such as when she starts a prison escape to save tortured Raggers. Raisa is 16-years-old and is short with long, thick black hair. Her skin is said to be honey colored and her eyes emerald green. She is said to be very beautiful, with a waist a man can put his two hands around. At the beginning of the series, she is shown to be very naive - such as when she told Han he would be given a fair trial if he gave himself in; over the series, she becomes more worldly. Her best friend, Amon Byrne, is the captain of her guard. They nearly shared a romantic relationship, but that quickly ended when Raisa learned of the Bonding, but they remained best friends throughout the series.

Oden's Ford: She left her queendom when her mother tried to force her into an illegal marriage, to Micah Bayar, under the influence of the High Wizard. The marrying of a queen to a wizard consort has been banned since the Naèming - the ceremony which was done by the Queen Hanalea in order to save the world from the Demon King in the Breaking. Raisa then traveled to Wein House at Oden's Ford, the best academy in all of the Seven Realms. She is accompanied by Amon and his triple, the gray wolves, with whom she forms close bonds with. There she crosses path with Han Alister who only knows her as Rebecca Morley. They quickly become entangled with each other. It is shown throughout the 2nd book (The Exiled Queen) that they both have deep feelings for one another.

Her relationship with her mother isn't the best because her mother, Queen Marianna, favored her younger sister, Princess Mellony. Raisa and the queen are considered to be complete opposites, even in their appearance. But even though the relationship between Raisa and her mother is not optimal, she is very sad when her mother dies, leaving her as queen. Raisa takes after her father, Lord Averill Lightfoot, a Demonai warrior and Royal Consort to the Queen. Her crest and clan name is Briar Rose.

=== Amon Byrne ===
Amon Byrne is introduced after he comes back from Wien House in Oden's Ford. Princess Raisa and Amon grew up as childhood best friends. Despite their difference in station, they were forced together due to the lack of children in court. They are still very close, and there is a steadfast romantic attraction that follows the two of them throughout several of the books, but the difference in their stations, and the bonding between the queen and the captain of the guard, keeps them apart. Throughout the series, Amon is completely concerned with Princess Raisa's safety and makes that clear to her numerous times, mostly to her dismay. Amon is also very blunt, kind, caring, honest, and straight to the point. Eventually, he becomes the Captain of the Queen's Guard. He is the son of Edon Byrne, the Captain of the Queen's Guard before him. He is also the commander of the Gray Wolves and attends Wien House in Oden's Ford with Princess Raisa for a time and is a commander there.

=== Mellony ana'Marianna ===
Princess Mellony ana'Marianna is the younger princess of the Fells. She is described as favoring the side of her mother, Queen Marianna ana'Lissa, by the blue eyes, blond hair, fair complexion, and most of all, her naive personality. In the beginning of the series, Mellony is described as "bubbly and outgoing". However, that changes when Raisa leaves the queendom, as Mellony succumbs to the throne and overlooks it as an attraction for her daring yet dangerous crush, Micah Bayar. In a certain event, the two are seen kissing passionately. Mellony begins to overlook the title of being a Gray Wolf queen and makes some choices that affect the queendom of the Fells greatly, such as not believing Raisa when Raisa accuses their dead mother of forcing her to marry the young Lord Bayar, which Mellony does not believe, because she has fallen in love with him.

Mellony is the favored daughter of Queen Marianna. Being younger, less observant, and less stubborn than her sister Raisa, the Bayars believed she would be easier to manipulate. This was made especially true when she fell in love with Micah Bayar.

=== Micah Bayar ===
Micah Bayar is the handsome and daring son of the High Wizard, Gavan Bayar, and brother to Fiona. He is also related to Fire Dancer of Marisa Pines Camp, as his father seduced his mother for her looks and personality, as a younger half-brother. He begins to take an interest in Princess Raisa ana'Marianna for a bride, as instructed to by his father. When Raisa leaves the queendom, he is under the control of his father and takes control of Mellony, though he prefers Raisa. He is a powerful wizard, but not nearly as skilled as Han.
