= Marvel's Storyboards =

2020 documentary web television series

- Official logo
- Genre: Documentary
- Created by: Joe Quesada
- Written by: Eric Enright
- Directed by: Tony Castle
- Presented by: Joe Quesada
- Country of origin: United States
- Original language: English
- No. of seasons: 2
- No. of episodes: 12

Production
- Executive producers: Joe Quesada; Tony Castle; Roxy Hunt
- Production company: Marvel New Media

Original release
- Network: YouTube
- Release: July 23 – December 15, 2020

Marvel's Storyboards is an American web television documentary series developed by Marvel New Media and hosted by Joe Quesada. The series was released on Marvel Entertainment's YouTube channel on July 23, 2020. The series was originally planned as a 12-episode miniseries, but its release, initially scheduled for November 2019, was postponed, and the project was later split into two seasons.

== Premise ==
Marvel's Storyboards follows Joe Quesada, executive vice president and creative director of Marvel Entertainment, as he explores the origin stories and inspirations of storytellers across various mediums and backgrounds, visiting their favorite locations in New York City and beyond. Quesada stated that the series "captures the spirit and drive behind some of the most incredible voices across film, television, music, theater, sports, journalism, and beyond," and emphasized the importance of making these inspirational stories widely accessible during a time when many were spending more time at home.

== Episodes ==
Season	Episodes	Originally released	
Season	Episodes	First released	Last released
1	6	July 23, 2020	August 27, 2020
2	6	November 16, 2020	December 15, 2020

=== Season 1 (2020) ===
No. overall	No. in season	Title	Interviewee	Profession/ Known for	Original release date
1	1	"Hugh Jackman's Wolverine Journey"	Hugh Jackman	Actor known for playing Wolverine	July 23, 2020
2	2	"Natalia Cordova-Buckley & A Super Hero Workout"	Natalia Cordova-Buckley	Actress known for playing Elena "Yo-Yo" Rodriguez	July 30, 2020
3	3	"Christian Borle & Comics in Theatre!"	Christian Borle	Actor	August 6, 2020
4	4	"Johnny Weir & The History of Super Hero Costumes"	Johnny Weir	Figure skater	August 13, 2020
5	5	"Margaret Stohl & The Life of Captain Marvel"	Margaret Stohl	Writer	August 20, 2020
6	6	"Robert Lopez & The Art of Songwriting"	Robert Lopez	Songwriter	August 27, 2020

=== Season 2 (2020) ===
No. overall	No. in season	Title	Interviewee	Profession/ Known for	Original release date
7	1	"Gillian Jacobs & The Art of Directing"	Gillian Jacobs	Notable director	November 16, 2020
8	2	"Sasheer Zamata & Stand-Up Comedy"	Sasheer Zamata	Comedian	November 23, 2020
9	3	"Samhita Mukhopadhyay & The History of Costumes"	Samhita Mukhopadhyay	Costume designer	November 30, 2020
10	4	"Nelson Figueroa & His Baseball Origin Story"	Nelson Figueroa	Athlete	December 1, 2020
11	5	"Taboo & The Power of Representation"	Taboo	Musician	December 8, 2020
12	6	"Ed Viesturs and the Mountaintop"	Ed Viesturs	Mountaineer	December 15, 2020

== Production ==
=== Development ===
Joe Quesada conceived the series after interviewing Charlie Cox at the 2017 San Diego Comic-Con and pitched the idea to Disney+, which subsequently greenlit the project. In July 2020, Marvel Entertainment announced that the series would move from Disney+ to its YouTube channel, with a premiere date of July 23, 2020.

=== Filming ===
Quesada designed the series to be participatory rather than consisting solely of one-on-one interviews. In the episode featuring Ed Viesturs, Quesada joined Viesturs for high-altitude mountain climbing in the Idaho Mountains. He commented on the experience, "A comparison that everyone knows is Anthony Bourdain: Parts Unknown. We go on locations, but instead of food or culture being the focus, the focus is a guest, the way they tell stories, and their story… The show started when someone asked me, 'What's your hobby?' and I realized that, much like Stan Lee, I'm doing my hobby for a living. That's the reason Stan never retired—he was living that old adage, 'When you do what you love, you never work a day again.' And my absolute love is storytelling. So I started to formulate this… The results are sometimes hilarious. If you want to see me face-plant in the snow several times with a mountain climber, you get your wish."

=== Guests ===
The first season featured twelve guests, including Hugh Jackman, Robert Lopez, Samhita Mukhopadhyay, Johnny Weir and Ed Viesturs. Guests in the second season included Sasheer Zamata, Ed Viesturs, Nelson Figueroa, Samhita Mukhopadhyay, and Taboo.

== Release ==
Marvel's Storyboards premiered on the Marvel Entertainment YouTube channel on July 23, 2020, and ran for six episodes until August 27, 2020. The second season, also comprising six episodes, was released from November to December 2020. The first season of Marvel's Storyboards received over five million views on YouTube.
