= Beautiful Creatures (2013 film) =

2013 film by Richard LaGravenese

- Theatrical release poster
- Directed by: Richard LaGravenese
- Written by: Richard LaGravenese
- Based on: Beautiful Creatures by Kami Garcia; Margaret Stohl
- Produced by: Erwin Stoff; Andrew A. Kosove; Broderick Johnson; Molly Smith; David Valdes
- Starring: Alden Ehrenreich; Alice Englert; Jeremy Irons; Viola Davis; Emmy Rossum; Thomas Mann; Emma Thompson
- Cinematography: Philippe Rousselot
- Edited by: David Moritz
- Music by: Thenewno2; Dhani Harrison; Paul Hicks
- Production companies: Alcon Entertainment; 3 Arts Entertainment; Belle Pictures
- Distributed by: Warner Bros. Pictures (United States); Summit Entertainment (International)
- Release dates: January 19, 2013 (Moscow); February 14, 2013 (United States)
- Running time: 124 minutes
- Country: United States
- Language: English
- Budget: $50–60 million
- Box office: $60.1 million

Beautiful Creatures is a 2013 American romantic gothic fantasy film written for the screen and directed by Richard LaGravenese. Based on the 2009 novel of the same name by Kami Garcia and Margaret Stohl, the film stars Alden Ehrenreich, Alice Englert, Jeremy Irons, Viola Davis, Emmy Rossum, Thomas Mann, and Emma Thompson.

It was released in the United States on February 14, 2013, by Warner Bros. Pictures. It received mixed reviews from critics and grossed only $60.1 million worldwide against its $60 million budget.

== Plot ==
In Gatlin, South Carolina, teen Ethan Wate awakens from a recurring dream of a girl he has not met. He despairs of his small-town existence and dreams of leaving for college.

On Ethan's first day of junior year, newcomer Lena Duchannes arrives, who resembles the girl in his dreams. Other students gossip about Lena's reclusive uncle Macon Ravenwood, and suggest that the members of her family are devil worshippers. On the way home, Ethan nearly runs her over. Giving her a ride, they bond over interests.

In class, a few students insist that they cannot be in class with Lena so they pray to be protected from her and her family. Visibly shaken, her class’ windows shatter, which increases fears and suspicions that she is a witch. Ethan and Lena become friends, and he gives her a locket that he found at Greenbriar. Both touch the locket, which triggers a shared flashback to the American Civil War.

Macon disapproves of their relationship and conspires with Ethan's family friend Amma to separate them. Lena tells Ethan that she and her family are "casters" (called witches by mortals) and can perform spells. On her 16th birthday, her true nature will reveal itself toward either the light or dark.

Complications arise when two powerful dark casters aim to push Lena to the dark: Lena's cousin Ridley and Lena's mother Sarafine, who did not raise her and has possessed the mother of Ethan's friend Link, Mrs. Lincoln.

Foreseeing that Lena will become a powerful caster, Sarafine wants Lena to use her power to purge the Earth of mortals and leave just casters. The couple have another flashback of their past with the locket that reveals that their ancestors, the caster Genevieve Duchannes and the mortal Confederate soldier Ethan Carter Wate, were in love. Ethan died in battle, and Genevieve revived him. Doing so laid a curse on all Duchannes women, who will go dark on their 16th birthday.

A mortified Lena asks Amma to help since she is a seer and keeper of the caster library, which is beneath the town library and extends across the United States. The most ancient of the books reveals the secret to undoing the curse: a person Lena loves has to die. Unwilling to take Ethan's life, Lena erases his memories of their love.

Seducing Link, Ridley gives him a bullet to use in the upcoming Civil War reenactment of the Battle of Honey Hill, which is also on Lena's 16th birthday. Lena feels the shock of the curse being broken, runs to Ethan, and clutches his dying body while Ridley and Sarafine encourage her to accept the dark. She lashes out in anger and sends a huge tornado through the crowd until Ethan's body transforms into Macon, who disguised himself to be the sacrifice to lift the curse.

As Macon is dying, he reveals that he promised Ethan's mother to keep her son alive. Those dying words encourage Lena to "claim herself". She causes the moon to disappear so it cannot claim her for the dark. Allowing Ridley to flee, she pulls Sarafine from Mrs. Lincoln's body and powerfully seals away Sarafine's spirit.

Six months later, a still-amnesiac Ethan visits Amma in the library before a college tour with Link. Lena gives him a book that they had once shared as a present. She is a half-light/dark caster. As Link and Ethan reach the town line, the town's burned exit sign seems to restore his memories. He gets out of the car and shouts for Lena, who hears his call.

== Cast ==
- Alden Ehrenreich as Ethan Wate
- Alice Englert as Lena Duchannes
- Jeremy Irons as Macon Melchizedek Ravenwood
- Viola Davis as Amarie Treadeau, "Amma"
- Emmy Rossum as Ridley Duchannes
- Thomas Mann as Wesley Jefferson Lincoln, "Link"
- Emma Thompson as Mavis Lincoln/Sarafine Duchannes
- Margo Martindale as Delphine Duchannes, "Aunt Del"
- Eileen Atkins as Emmaline Duchannes, "Gramma"
- Zoey Deutch as Emily Asher
- Tiffany Boone as Savannah Snow
- Kyle Gallner as Larkin Kent
- Rachel Brosnahan as Genevieve Katherine Duchannes
- Pruitt Taylor Vince as Mr. Lee
- Robin Skye as Mrs. Hester
- Randy Redd as Reverend Stephens
- Lance E. Nichols as Mayor Snow
- Leslie Castay as Principal Herbert
- Sam Gilroy as Ethan Carter Wate
- Gwendolyn Mulamba as Mrs. Snow
- Cindy Hogan as Mrs. Asher

== Production ==
Alcon Entertainment purchased the rights to Beautiful Creatures in 2009, with the director Richard LaGravenese signing on soon after to write and direct the movie. Casting began in late 2011, and in February 2012, Viola Davis was cast as Amma. Soon after, Jack O'Connell and Alice Englert were announced to play the lead characters of Ethan Wate and Lena Duchannes. O'Connell later dropped out because of a scheduling conflict, with Alden Ehrenreich assuming the role of Ethan. Further casting included Emma Thompson as Sarafine and Mrs. Lincoln and Jeremy Irons as Lena's uncle, Macon Ravenwood. Of the character of Lena, Englert stated that "Lena is like most girls when you feel massively insecure."

Principal photography was originally scheduled to begin 23 April 2012 in New Orleans and it took place, according to LaGravenese, from "I think, April 16th, and then we shot until June 26th, and then post[-production] was for me from July 5th to December 17th." LaGravenese chose to incorporate practical special effects along with computer-based ones for certain scenes, as Emmy Rossum described: "[W]hen we walked on to the stage and realized the chandelier does actually move, the chairs did actually spin, the table did actually spin.... it was all very exciting." On 19 September 2012, the first trailer for Beautiful Creatures was released.

Camille Balsamo played Genevieve Katherine Duchannes in a sequence cut from the film; LaGravenese said:

There was one part that I shot on green screen where I had all these actresses playing all the different Duchannes women from different periods [from the Civil War on]. And my costume designer, Jeffrey Kurland, had gowns and things, one was from the turn of the century, one was from the '20s, one was from the ’40s, one was from the '60s, and they were going to appear in the first flashback and at the end of the movie, and then I cut them.... It was just an idea that didn't work.

=== Music ===
The original soundtrack was composed by thenewno2 and released by WaterTower Music. Its musical style was referred to as "swamptronic", a term coined by LaGravenese, and it was recorded at Abbey Road. Dhanni Harrison, son of George Harrison, used some of his father's guitars and equipment in recording the soundtrack.

== Distribution ==
=== Release ===
The film's release date was originally scheduled to be on 13 February 2013, but the distributor Warner Bros. Pictures later pushed the date to 24 February 2013. The film was still released in Sweden on the 13th, a day before the film's North American release date. The film held its official US premiere on 11 February 2013, in New York City.

=== Home media ===
Beautiful Creatures was released on DVD and Blu-ray on 21 May 2013. In its first month in release, the film sold around 428,792 copies in both DVD and Blu-ray formats combined, bringing in a consumer revenue of $7,377,859. As of 16 June 2013, the film has grossed an estimated $10,337,826 in DVD and Blu-ray sales.

== Reception ==
=== Box office ===
The film grossed $10,124,912 during its opening weekend, including its Thursday release date, under-performing based on media expectations.

While the film was considered to be a flop domestically by grossing only $19,452,138 by the end of its North American domestic theatrical run against a $60 million production budget, it did better internationally, where it has grossed $40,600,000. As of 21 April 2013, the film grossed a worldwide total of $60,052,138, making it a financial loss. It failed to recoup its production budget and other costs, as generally speaking, half of ticket sales proceeds go to theaters. Variety magazine listed Beautiful Creatures as one of "Hollywood's biggest box office bombs of 2013".

=== Critical response ===
The film has received mixed reviews from critics. It has a 47% rating on review aggregation website Rotten Tomatoes, based on 180 reviews, with the site's consensus stating: "Charming romantic leads and esteemed supporting cast aside, Beautiful Creatures is a plodding YA novel adaptation that feels watered down for the Twilight set". On Metacritic, the film received a score of 52/100 based on 40 reviews, indicating mixed or average reviews.

Owen Gleiberman, in Entertainment Weekly, gave the film a "B−", writing, "Beautiful Creatures is arriving in a market-place full of Twilight junkies still eager for their supernatural teen-romantic fix, and the film's concept couldn't be clearer: It's Twilight with the sexes reversed. This time it's the boy who's the mortal: moody, bookish Ethan, the outsider in his sleepy small town." Gleiberman added that though the film "is lushly pictorial and not-too-badly acted... the audience, like Ethan, spends way too much time waiting around for Lena to learn whether she's a good girl or a bad girl."

The film review website ScreenRant called the film "a choppy and melodramatic experience with very little payoff beyond the central love story. Worse yet, overlooking the usual on-the-nose dialogue about eternal love and sacrifice, this tale of star-crossed sweethearts is especially cheesy and unconvincing – even when compared to similarly heavy-handed young adult novel-turned-movies. Fans of the supernatural romance subgenre will get about what they expect...."

David Denby of The New Yorker wrote that the movie "is a classic example of the confusions and the outright blunders that can overtake talented people who commit themselves to a concept driven purely by the movie marketplace.... Alas, the satirical energy and Ethan's bright talk dissipate after a while." He praises a scene from the Civil War flashback which "appears as Ethan and Lena are watching a movie in a local theatre, but only they can see it" as "an interesting idea that I wish LaGravenese had pursued as a parallel narrative. This kind of movie, however, demands not interesting ideas but whooshing spectacle and madly redundant climaxes and a soundtrack filled with thuds and a shouting female chorus."

Scott Mendelson of Forbes magazine called the film "shockingly good" and encouraged viewers who missed it to check it out on video.

CinemaScore audience polls gave the film a B grade.

Beautiful Creatures was featured on episode 187 of the comedy podcast How Did This Get Made?.

=== Accolades ===
| Award | Category | Nominee | Result |
|---|---|---|---|
| 2013 Teen Choice Awards | Choice Movie Romance | | Nominated |
| 2013 Teen Choice Awards | Choice Movie Actor Romance | Alden Ehrenreich | Nominated |
| 2013 Teen Choice Awards | Choice Movie Actress Romance | Alice Englert | Nominated |
| 2013 Teen Choice Awards | Choice Movie: Sci-Fi/Fantasy | | Nominated |
| 2013 Teen Choice Awards | Choice Movie Breakout | Alice Englert | Nominated |
| 2013 Teen Choice Awards | Choice Movie Liplock | Alden Ehrenreich and Alice Englert | Nominated |

== Canceled sequels ==
Warner Bros. and Alcon Entertainment initially purchased the film rights to all four novels in the Caster Chronicles series, with this film being based on the first book. Tentative plans for the next three books to be adapted into films were abandoned following this film's failure at the box office, along with criticism that this film deviated too much from the novel, which would make it difficult to adapt the sequel novels into films.
