= Mark Cotta Vaz =

American Author

Mark Cotta Vaz (born September 16, 1954, in San Francisco, California) is an American author, editor and film historian. He has authored over thirty books, including four New York Times bestsellers. In 1989, he wrote Tales of the Dark Knight Batman's First Fifty Years: 1939–1989, which the Los Angeles Times noted "will delight comics fans." He has focused on documenting film special effects and other behind-the-scenes aspects of visual presentation. He has written about these aspects for both Star Wars and Star Trek. He has produced a number of movie companion books, such as those for The Spirit, Beautiful Creatures and four for the Twilight series. Publishers Weekly said about his biography of Merian C. Cooper: The charismatic Cooper, "a man living his own movie," is no longer an obscure, remote figure, thanks to Vaz's exhaustive research and skillful writing.

== Selected works ==
- (1989) Tales of the Dark Knight Batman's First Fifty Years: 1939–1989
- (1995) From Star Wars to Indiana Jones: The Best of the LucasFilm Archives co-authored with Shinji Hata
- (1996) Industrial Light & Magic: Into the Digital Realm co-authored with Patricia Rose Duignan
- (2002) The Invisible Art: The Legends of Movie Matte Painting co-authored with Craig Barron
- (2002) The Art of Star Wars: Episode II: Attack of the Clones
- (2005) Living Dangerously: The Adventures of Merian C. Cooper, Creator of King Kong a Los Angeles Times bestseller
- (2006) Mythic Vision: The Making of Eragon
- (2008) The Spirit: The Movie Visual Companion
- (2009) Star Trek – The Art of the Film
- (2009) New Moon: The illustrated companion to the movie based on the second book in Stephenie Meyer’s Twilight vampire romance series. A New York Times bestseller.
- (2010) The Inheritance Almanac: An A-to-Z Guide to the World of Eragon co-authored with Michael Macauley
- (2012) Batmobile: The Complete History
- (2013) Beautiful Creatures: The Official Illustrated Movie Companion
- (2014) Godzilla: The Art of Destruction
- (2014) Interstellar: Beyond Time and Space
