= Bad Behaviour (2023 film) =

Film by Alice Englert

- Release poster
- Directed by: Alice Englert
- Written by: Alice Englert
- Produced by: Desray Armstrong; Molly Hallam
- Starring: Jennifer Connelly; Alice Englert; Dasha Nekrasova; Karan Gill; Marlon Williams; Ben Whishaw
- Cinematography: Matt Henley
- Edited by: Simon Price
- Music by: Cameron Tuliloa McArthur; Alice Englert
- Production companies: Sandy Lane Productions; Ask About My Films; New Zealand Film Commission; Bee-hive Productions
- Distributed by: Ahi Films
- Release dates: January 21, 2023 (Sundance); November 2, 2023 (New Zealand)
- Running time: 107 minutes
- Country: New Zealand
- Language: English
- Box office: $88,469

Bad Behaviour is a 2023 New Zealand dark comedy film directed and written by Alice Englert in her feature directorial debut. She also stars in the film alongside Jennifer Connelly, Dasha Nekrasova, Karan Gill, Marlon Williams and Ben Whishaw.

The film premiered at the 2023 Sundance Film Festival on 21 January 2023, and was released in select New Zealand cinemas on 2 November 2023.

== Cast ==
- Jennifer Connelly as Lucy, a former child actress
- Alice Englert as Dylan, Lucy's daughter and stunt performer
- Dasha Nekrasova as Beverly
- Karan Gill as Leonard
- Marlon Williams as Elmore
- Ben Whishaw as Elon Bello, a spiritual leader
- Beulah Koale as Dion
- Ana Scotney as Petunia
- Alistair Sewell as Tom
- Robbie Magasiva as Lawrence

== Production ==
In June 2022, it was reported that Jennifer Connelly and Ben Whishaw joined the cast of the film, with Alice Englert directing from a screenplay she wrote.

During an interview with W in November 2022, Englert revealed that the film's production had just wrapped and taken place in New Zealand.

== Release ==
Bad Behaviour had its world premiere at 2023 Sundance Film Festival on 21 January 2023. It was released in select New Zealand cinemas on 2 November 2023; in the UK the film was released on Icon Film Channel on 4 December 2023, followed by the release in cinemas on 5 January 2024. It was released in limited cinemas and VOD by Gravitas Ventures in the United States and Canada on 18 June 2024.

== Reception ==
=== Critical response ===
On the review aggregator website Rotten Tomatoes, 48% of 44 critics' reviews are positive, with an average rating of 7.5/10. The website's consensus reads: "Despite impressive work from Jennifer Connelly and Alice Englert, Bad Behaviour is too scattered and disjointed to support its unwieldy ambitions." Metacritic, which uses a weighted average, assigned the film a score of 57 out of 100, based on 13 critics, indicating "mixed or average" reviews.

=== Awards and nominations ===
Award	Date of ceremony	Category	Recipient(s)	Result	Ref.
Sydney Film Festival	18 June 2023	Best Film	Bad Behaviour	Nominated	
