= The Lovers (2013 film) =

- Theatrical release poster
- Directed by: Roland Joffé
- Screenplay by: Roland Joffé
- Story by: Ajey Jhankar
- Produced by: Paul Breuls; Guy J Louthan; Dale G Bradley; Catherine Vandeleene
- Starring: Josh Hartnett; Bipasha Basu; Alice Englert; Tamsin Egerton; Abhay Deol
- Cinematography: Michael Coulter; Ben Nott
- Edited by: John Scott
- Music by: Dirk Brossé
- Production companies: Corsan Films; Limelight Media; Bliss Media; Neelmudra Entertainment
- Distributed by: Corsan World Sales; IFC Films (US)
- Release dates: 25 October 2013 (Philip K. Dick European Science Fiction Film Festival); 15 May 2014 (Cannes); 13 March 2015 (limited release)
- Running time: 109 minutes
- Country: Belgium
- Language: English
- Budget: $27 million

The Lovers (previously known as Singularity, released in the UK as Time Traveller and in Belgium under the French title La Prophétie de l'anneau) is a 2013 Belgian romance time travel adventure film written and directed by Roland Joffé from a story by Ajey Jhankar. The film stars Josh Hartnett, Indian actress Bipasha Basu in her only foreign film to date, Alice Englert, Tamsin Egerton and Abhay Deol in lead roles. The film is the tale of an impossible romance set against the backdrop of the first Anglo-Maratha war across two time periods and continents and centred on four characters—a British officer in 18th century British India, the Indian woman he falls deeply in love with, and a 21st-century American marine archeologist and his wife.

== Plot ==
In 2020, marine archeologist Jay Fennel (Josh Hartnett) is brain-dead after trying to save his wife Laura (Tamsin Egerton) who got trapped exploring the wreck of a colonial British East Indiaman. The comatose Fennel dreams about the adventures of Captain James Stewart in 1778 Pune, and his romance with a Maratha warrior Tulaja Naik (Bipasha Basu).

== Cast ==
- Josh Hartnett as Jay Fennel and James Stewart
- Bipasha Basu as Tulaja Naik
- Tamsin Egerton as Laura Fennel, Jay's wife
- James Mackay as Charles Stewart, James' brother
- Alice Englert as Dolly
- Simone Kessell as Clara Coldstream
- Abhay Deol as Udaji
- Aegina de Vas as Queen Jamnabai
- Andrea Deck as Ali
- Matthew Beard as Matt
- Bille Brown
- Steve Nicolson as Yost
- Vijay Thombre as Desai
- Yateen Karyekar as Mudhoji Killedar
- Shane Briant as Governor Hornby, the governor of Bombay
- Claire van der Boom
- Roshan Seth as Guru Dev (uncredited)
- Atul Kulkarni as Raoji
- Milind Gunaji as Shiv
- Vijay Thombre as Havaldar Desai, Captain James Stewart's right-hand man
- Tehmina Sunny as Sonubai
- Mahesh Jadu as the Assassin

== Production ==
The Lovers was produced by Paul Breuls' Corsan NV, Dale G. Bradley's Limelight International Media Entertainment, Wei Han's Bliss Media and co-financed by Ajey Jhankar's Neelmudra Entertainment. Sales outfit Corsan World Sales, a division of Corsan NV, is handling international sales. Previously known as The Invaders, the film was in works from the late 1990s and was due originally to feature Hollywood actors Brendan Fraser and Neve Campbell and Bollywood actors Aishwarya Rai Bachchan and Vivek Oberoi. The Anglo-Indian historical romance is Bipasha Basu's first English language film. She was encouraged to take up her international debut by actress Hilary Swank. Basu first met up with Swank at the New Seven Wonders of the World Official Declaration ceremony convened in Lisbon in 2007 and met her again at the 2011 International Indian Film Academy Awards in Toronto. Though originally planned for shooting partly in the United Kingdom, production began in Queensland, Australia, on 8 November 2010. It concluded there on the third week of December 2010. The production then moved to India on 31 March 2011 for a further five weeks, roaming the rocky terrain of Chambal, Orchha and Gwalior in the state of Madhya Pradesh. Principal photography wrapped on 23 April 2011. The film was planned to premiere at the 65th annual Cannes International Film Festival in May 2012, but in late 2011 the production company was placed in administration and all further filming was stopped when some ten percent remained. In June 2012, Belgian-based financing and production outfit Corsan agreed to put further money into the production, and the final scenes were to be shot in London. In September 2012, it was reported that the filming in London was finished, while some creditors were still waiting for payment. And in May 2013, producer Paul Breuls confirmed that the film has been finally completed and aims to launch it at an autumn festival.

== Release ==
A preview trailer for the film premiered on 6 December 2011 at the 11th annual Festival International du Film de Marrakech during a master class given by Roland Joffé. In late April 2014, the production company Corsan announced that the film would be shown at the 67th annual Cannes Film Festival on 15 May 2014 under the new name The Lovers. The film was released on DVD in the UK as Time Traveller in 2016.
