= Beautiful Darkness =

2010 novel by Kami Garcia and Margaret Stohl

- First edition
- Author: Kami Garcia; Margaret Stohl
- Language: English
- Series: Caster Chronicles
- Genre: Young adult, Fantasy, Romance
- Publisher: Little, Brown
- Publication date: October 12, 2010
- Publication place: United States
- Pages: 512
- ISBN: 978-0-316-07705-7
- Preceded by: Beautiful Creatures
- Followed by: Beautiful Chaos

Beautiful Darkness is a young adult paranormal romance novel written by Kami Garcia and Margaret Stohl. The second novel in the Caster Chronicles, it was published by Little, Brown on October 12, 2010.

The third novel, Beautiful Chaos. was released on October 18, 2011. Beautiful Darkness debuted at number three on the New York Times Bestsellers list for children's books.

== Synopsis ==
The book continues to follow Ethan Wate, a teenage boy living in the small Southern town of Gatlin. He is in love with Lena Duchannes, a girl with the ability to work great magic, which she used to bring Ethan back to life after the events in the preceding book. She has managed to avoid having to make the choice between dark or light, but she is still not free to live her life as she chooses.

== Reception ==
Critical reception for Beautiful Darkness was positive, with the Manila Bulletin calling it "moody and atmospheric." Booklist praised the book's "gothic atmosphere" and new characters. The School Library Journal blog positively reviewed Beautiful Darkness, with a librarian also giving a positive review for the book's "great storytelling balance." Kirkus Reviews noted that while the book had a "weaker and more hurried plot" than its predecessor, "readers... will find satisfaction here."
