= Beautiful Chaos (Garcia and Stohl novel) =

2011 novel by Kami Garcia and Margaret Stohl

- Cover to the 2011 first edition hardback
- Author: Kami Garcia and Margaret Stohl
- Language: English
- Series: Caster Chronicles
- Genre: Young adult, Fantasy, Romance
- Publisher: Little, Brown
- Publication date: October 18, 2011
- Publication place: United States
- ISBN: 978-0-316-12352-5
- Preceded by: Beautiful Darkness
- Followed by: Beautiful Redemption

Beautiful Chaos is a paranormal romance young adult novel by authors Kami Garcia and Margaret Stohl. The book is the third entry in the Caster Chronicles series and was released on October 18, 2011.

Beautiful Chaos debuted at number 45 on the USA Today bestseller list.

== Plot ==
Beautiful Chaos takes place shortly after the events in the previous book. Lena and Ethan are once again a couple, but her Claiming both the Light and Dark has some serious repercussions, as it disturbed the Order of things. Meanwhile Ethan finds himself slowly changing. He is unable to eat even his favorite foods without becoming nauseous, begins to hear voices, see mysterious writings, and his dreams make it impossible for him to sleep. Ethan also finds himself beginning to slowly lose his memories as well as seeing a stranger in his mirror, something that Amma reacts abnormally to. Suspicious, Ethan and Link follow Amma as she travels to visit a male Seer. They decide to return later to visit him, where they discover that due to Ethan being revived in the events in Beautiful Creatures, his soul was brought back too quickly and was fractured as a result. Part of his soul resides in the underworld and unless Ethan brings the two back together, he will eventually change more and ultimately lose himself completely. Link inquires as to how this would be possible, only for the Seer to mention that he and Amma made a deal and then refuse to elaborate.

As the chaos in Gatlin increases, Ethan and Lena attempt to find a way to save the town. They discover that the "One Who is Two" must be sacrificed for Order to be brought back into balance. It is believed that this person is Lena, as she had claimed both the Light and the Dark, only for them to find that it cannot be her because she is destined to bind the new Order once this person is sacrificed. The group briefly believes that it is John and the group travels to the town's water tower so John can commit suicide. Once there, John shares a brief moment with Liv, whom he has grown to love, before jumping from the tower. John narrowly avoids death, as it is revealed through one of the voices in Ethan's head that John is not the sacrifice and the group is transported back to Ethan's room by the Seer.

Ethan eventually discovers that he is the one destined to be the sacrifice to restore Order and spends the rest of the night in Lena's arms. The next day, he spends his last hours with his loved ones, later going to find Lena so he can say goodbye. Lena begs him not to become the sacrifice and that nothing else matters but him. The two exchange gifts, Ethan giving Lena his map of the various locations he'd planned on traveling to and Lena giving him her memory necklace. Ethan makes Lena swear to bind the new Order after his death, only for Lena to become hysterical. For their last moments together he holds her until it is time for him to go. After leaving Lena, Ethan looked over his house and father one last time, as well as confronting Amma over her knowledge of his death and sacrifice.

Ethan arrives at the tower with John, only for Amma to appear and state that she was present for his birth and would do the same for his death, even though this is not that day. She attempts several times to save Ethan using her power and the power of her ancestors, which is interrupted with Macon's arrival and eventually ends with the Greats turning their backs on her. Ethan then climbs up the water tower and tries to jump, only to be stopped by his other half. The two fight, eventually toppling off the side of the water tower and slamming into the ground. Before he falls, Ethan thinks of Lena.

== Reception ==
Critical reception for Beautiful Chaos has been mostly positive, with TeenReads calling the book's ending "mind-boggling". RT Book Reviews gave the book 4 1/2 stars, saying it was "a must-read for series followers". VOYA wrote that the book was "multilayered", but sometimes inconsistent.
