= Richard Campion (theatre director) =

New Zealand theatre director (1923–2013)

Richard Campion ONZM
- Born: 13 December 1923
- Died: 2 July 2013 (aged 89)
- Citizenship: New Zealand
- Education: Victoria University of Wellington; Old Vic Theatre School
- Occupations: Theatre director and actor
- Known for: Co-founding The New Zealand Players
- Spouse(s): Edith Campion, Judith Phipson
- Children: 3, including Jane Campion
- Honours: New Zealand 1990 Commemoration Medal; Officer of the New Zealand Order of Merit; 2004 Queen's Birthday Honours

Richard Meckiff Campion ONZM (13 December 1923 – 2 July 2013) was a New Zealand actor, theatre director, and producer. Campion and his wife Edith Campion co-founded New Zealand's first professional theatre company, the New Zealand Players.

== Early life and education ==
Born into a family well-established in Wellington's Mt Victoria, he was the second son and third child, of John Stanley Campion (1893—1950) and his wife born Eleanor Wright, who he had brought back to New Zealand from London after serving in the first world war. The Campion family belonged to the Exclusive Brethren Christian Evangelical movement.

Campion attended Clyde Quay School and Wellington College. He studied at Victoria University College, where he met his future wife and trained as a secondary school teacher. After graduating, Campion taught at Wellington College.

== Career ==
Under the influences of playwright Bruce Mason, theatre director Ngaio Marsh, and German refugee Maria Dronke who was a talented actress, producer and teacher he developed into a theatre and opera director.

At the close of the 1940s Campion and his wife Edith spent three years in the Old Vic in London where he took the production course. Campion and Edith co-founded the New Zealand Players, New Zealand's first professional theatre company, in the spring of 1952. Ngaio Marsh agreed to return from London and produce one of their plays.

In 1990 Campion was awarded the New Zealand 1990 Commemoration Medal. In the 2004 Queen's Birthday Honours, he was appointed an Officer of the New Zealand Order of Merit, for services to the theatre.

The Academy Award-winning screenwriter, producer, and director Jane Campion is his daughter.

The Ngā Whakarākei O Whātaitai / Wellington Theatre Awards annually an award called The Richard Campion Accolade for Outstanding Performance.

== Personal life ==
Campion married heiress Edith Hannah in December 1945 at Wellington's Anglican pro-cathedral when they were both 22 and still attending university. Their children, Anna, Jane, and Michael, grew up in the world of New Zealand theatre. Their marriage came apart and Campion remarried Judith Phipson then headmistress of noted girls' boarding school, Woodford House.

Campion died in July 2013 at the age of 89. He had continued to attend the theatre though, Jane Campion said, by then he could neither hear nor understand the words. Downstage (in the Hannah Playhouse) and Circa theatres and ballet and opera all benefitted hugely from his life's work.

Richard was the leading figure of New Zealand theatre during the latter part of the 20th Century and we are privileged to remember him as an important part of our history and the first man of New Zealand professional theatre as we know it today. Ray Henwood
