= The Heir Chronicles =

Book series written by Cinda Williams Chima

- First book of the series, the Warrior Heir
- The Warrior Heir; The Wizard Heir; The Dragon Heir; The Enchanter Heir; The Sorcerer Heir
- Author: Cinda Williams Chima
- Country: United States
- Language: English
- Genre: Fantasy
- Publisher: Disney Hyperion
- Published: 2006–2008, 2013-2014
- Media type: Print

The Heir Chronicles is a young adult fantasy series that was written by Cinda Williams Chima and published through Disney Hyperion. The first book, The Warrior Heir, was published on April 2, 2006, and was named one of YALSA's "Popular Paperbacks for Young Adults" for 2008.

== Synopsis ==
The series begins with Jack, a teenager growing up in the small Ohio town of Trinity. His life seems largely uneventful until the day he neglects to take his daily medication. Jack is surprised to find that there are several benefits to not taking his medication (to be later known as Weirsbane), such as super strength and confidence. He decides to take advantage of this and try out for the soccer team, but almost kills a peer in the process. It's at that point that Jack finds that he's part of a secret magic society and that he's considered to be part of the race of Weirlinds, the warrior clan of the magical world. He then gets drawn into an intricate and complex society ruled over by two houses, the Red Rose and the White Rose, that are constantly at odds with one another. Because of his Warrior status, Jack is wanted by both sides and encounters all sorts of problems involving capture by one of the Roses for entry in the Game, a contest with two warriors representing each Rose fighting to the death. Jack's assistant principal (who happens to be a wizard), Leander Hastings, trains Jack and wants him to join another group that he would enter. Jack's aunt Linda (an enchanter) doesn't want him to be in the Games at all and tries to protect him. Jack, while all of this is going on, is distracted by Ellen, a girl he is attracted to.

== Bibliography ==
- The Warrior Heir (April 2006)
- The Wizard Heir (May 2007)
- The Dragon Heir (August 2008)
- The Enchanter Heir (October 2013)
- The Sorcerer Heir (October 2014)

== Characters ==
Jack Swift: Born a Wizard, received a Warrior stone transplant. Lives in Trinity, he was previously unaware that he was a Wizard/Warrior until one day he stopped taking his medicine. He fought in the Tournament at Raven's Ghyll against Ellen but they decided to rebel after falling in love. His sword is Shadowslayer, one of the 7 legendary swords presumed to have been myths from a different time.

Ellen Stephenson: A rare Warrior(Weirlind), she fought in Tournament in the Raven's Ghyll; Jack Swift's equal partner on the battlefield and off.

Linda Downey: Enchanter, guardian and aunt of Jack Swift. Collects Seph from his nightmare boarding school and brings him to Trinity

Harmon Fitch: The close friend of Jack who witnesses the night when Jack found Shadowslayer

Joseph “Seph” McCauley: A very powerful Wizard who doesn't know how to control his powers due to being an orphan. He is in seek of a Wizard to train him, however his lawyers, trying to keep out of the trouble, send him to a boarding school where the nightmares are worse than anything he had ever experienced before.

Jason Haley: An orphaned Wizard whose specialty is illusion.

Madison Moss: an Anaweir with an incredible ability and a soft spot for a certain Wizard. Originally from the South where she was incorrectly called a witch for having strange things happening around her.

Leander Hastings: A powerful wizard on the council of Wizards who is fighting for Wizards to have less power over the other magical communities.

Will Childers: Jack's friend who helps him while along on his journey.

== Film Adaptation ==
Walt Disney Studios Motion Pictures purchased the film rights.

== Reception ==
Critical reception for The Heir Chronicles has been mostly positive, and books in the series have received praise from the Bulletin of the Center for Children's Books and School Librarian. Reception for The Enchanter Heir has been mixed, as The Horn Book Guide wrote "Tangled conflict lines, secret identities, besieged protagonists, and nonstop action make this a thrilling and thought-provoking Heir Chronicles volume, despite dropped plot threads and a truncated resolution." The Bulletin of the Center for Children's Books was also mixed on The Enchanter Heir, criticizing the book's romance between Jonah and Emma and stated that while this "may not bother readers previously blinded by sparkly vampires, but as those readers are less likely to commit to series as complex as this one, expect some mild disappointment along with howling clamors for the next book." The Plain Dealer was more positive in their review for The Enchanter Heir and rated it a "B".
