= Alice Englert =

Australian actress (born 1994)

- Born: Alice Allegra Englert; 15 June 1994 (age 32); Sydney, Australia
- Occupation: Actress
- Years active: 2006–present
- Mother: Jane Campion
- Relatives: Richard Campion (grandfather); Edith Campion (grandmother)

Alice Allegra Englert (born 15 June 1994) is an Australian actress. The daughter of filmmaker Jane Campion, Englert is best known for her lead roles in films such as Ginger & Rosa (2012), Beautiful Creatures (2013), and Them That Follow (2019), as well as supporting roles in Body Brokers, The Power of the Dog (both 2021), and You Won't Be Alone (2022).

She made her feature directorial debut with the dark comedy film Bad Behaviour (2023), for which she was nominated for the Grand Jury Prize at the 2023 Sundance Film Festival.

== Early life ==
Alice Allegra Englert was born in Sydney on 15 June 1994, the daughter of New Zealand filmmaker Jane Campion and Australian filmmaker Colin Englert. She is the maternal granddaughter of actress Edith Campion and theatre director Richard Campion. She was raised in Sydney and various locations where her parents' work took the family, explaining, "I’ve spent half my life on planes. I have a lot of love for New Zealand, though. That is where the really arty, whimsical side of the family resided." She attended schools in Australia, New Zealand, New York City, Rome, and London, as well as other places in England such as the Sibford School, a Quaker school in Oxfordshire. Her parents divorced when she was seven. She later left high school to become an actress.

== Career ==
Englert made her film debut at the age of eight in a film called Listen, followed by an appearance in her mother's short film The Water Diary at the age of 12. She appeared in the sci-fi romance film The Lovers, which was showcased at the 2012 Cannes Film Festival and was later released on DVD in the UK as Time Traveller in 2016. In 2012, she starred in Ginger & Rosa. In 2013, she starred in the low-budget horror film In Fear and the supernatural romance film Beautiful Creatures, which was based on the novel of the same name. "Needle and Thread", a song written and performed by Englert, was used in the film's soundtrack. In an interview, she stated that she recorded the song "in the bathroom of the apartment [she] was staying in the Warehouse District of New Orleans". She had a role in 2020's Ratched on Netflix.

== Filmography ==
=== Film ===
Key
†	Denotes productions that have not yet been released

Year	Title	Role	Notes
2008	8	Ziggy	Segment: "The Water Diary"
2008	Flame of the West	Casey	Short film
2012	Ginger & Rosa	Rosa	
2013	Beautiful Creatures	Lena Duchannes	
2013	In Fear	Lucy	
2013	The Lovers	Dolly	a.k.a. Time Traveller
2015	The Boyfriend Game		Short film Writer and composer
2016	The Rehearsal	Thomasin	
2017	Family Happiness	Fiona	Short film Writer and director
2019	Them That Follow	Mara Childs	
2021	Body Brokers	Opal	
2021	The Power of the Dog	Buster	
2022	You Won't Be Alone	Biliana	
2023	Bad Behaviour	Dylan	Feature film Also director, writer and composer

=== Television ===
Key
†	Denotes productions that have not yet been released

Year	Title	Role	Notes
2014	New Worlds	Hope Russell	Main role; 4 episodes
2015	Jonathan Strange & Mr Norrell	Lady Emma Pole	Main role; 7 episodes
2017	Top of the Lake	Mary Edwards	Main role (season 2); 6 episodes
2020	Ratched	Dolly	Recurring role, 6 episodes
2021	The Serpent	Teresa Knowlton	Mini-series, 3 episodes
2022	Dangerous Liaisons	Camille, Marquise de Merteuil	Main role, 8 episodes
2024	Exposure	Jacs Gould	Mini-series, Main role (IMdB)
2026	Star City	Anastasia Belikova	Main role

== Awards and nominations ==
Year	Association	Category	Nominated work	Result
2012	British Independent Film Awards	Best Supporting Actress	Ginger & Rosa	Nominated
2013	Women Film Critics Circle	Women's Work/Best Ensemble (shared with Elle Fanning, Christina Hendricks, Jodhi May and Annette Bening)	Ginger & Rosa	Won
2013	Teen Choice Awards	Choice Movie: Liplock (shared with Alden Ehrenreich)	Beautiful Creatures	Nominated
2013	Teen Choice Awards	Choice Movie Breakout	Beautiful Creatures	Nominated
2013	Teen Choice Awards	Choice Movie Actress: Romance	Beautiful Creatures	Nominated
2016	Berlin International Film Festival	Generation Kplus – Best Short Film	The Boyfriend Game	Nominated
2017	St. Kilda Film Festival	Best Achievement in Screenplay	The Boyfriend Game	Won
