= Unity Theatre =

Unity Theatre may refer to one of several theatres:

== United Kingdom ==
In the United Kingdom, the Unity theatre movement developed from workers' drama groups in the 1930s, seeing itself as using theatre to highlight the issues of the working class being produced by and for working-class audiences. The movement had strong links with the Communist Party of Great Britain and the Left Book Club Theatre Guild.

At one time there were over 50 local theatre groups known as "Unity Theatre":

- Unity Theatre, Liverpool
- Unity Theatre, London
- Unity Theatre, Manchester
- Unity Theatre, Cardiff
- Glasgow Unity Theatre

== New Zealand ==
- Unity Theatre, Wellington

== United States ==
- The Unity Theatre, Brenham, Texas
