= Cinda Williams Chima =

American novelist

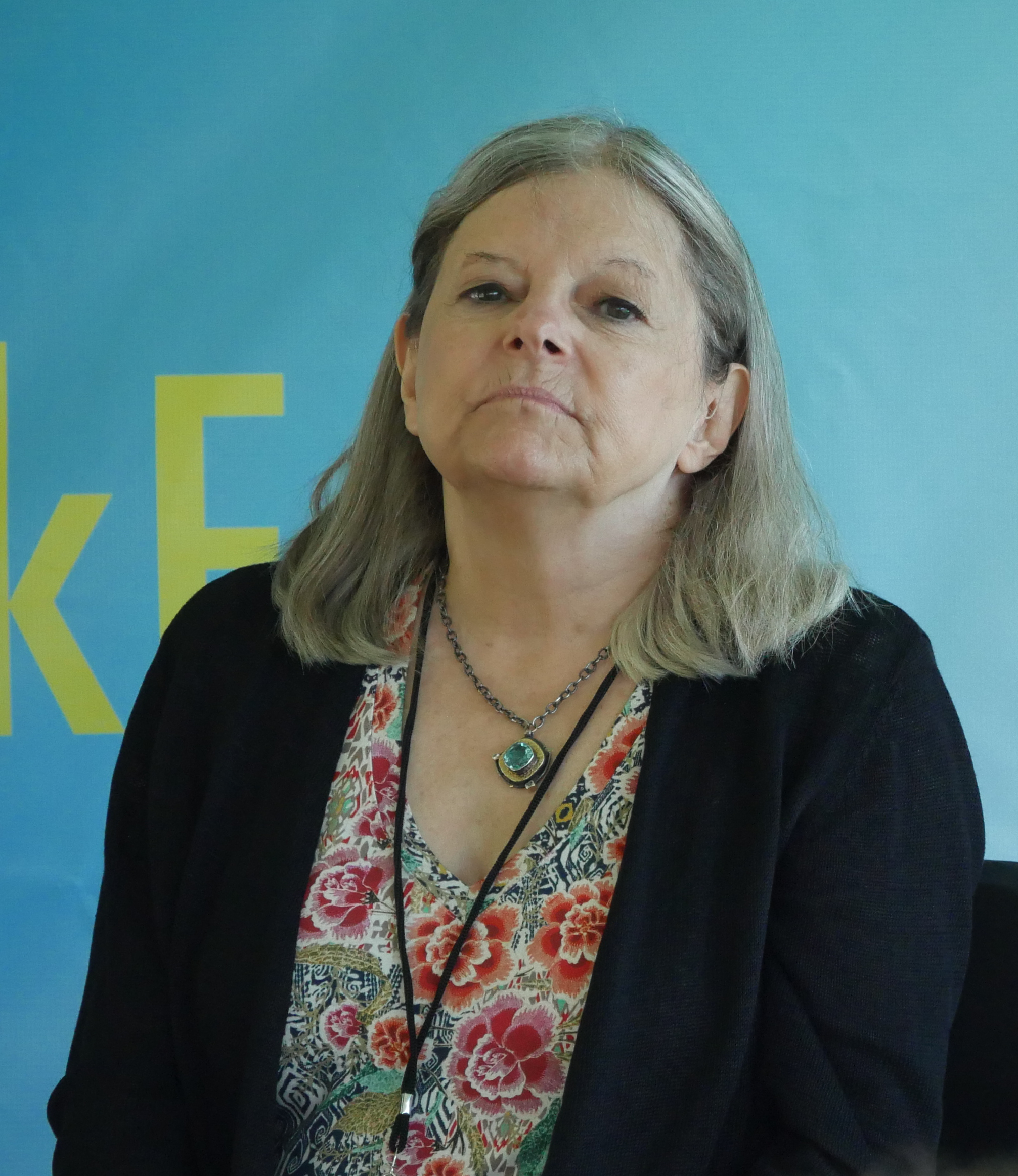
- Born: 1952 (age 73–74); Springfield, Ohio, U.S.
- Education: University of Akron (BA); Case Western Reserve University (Master's)
- Occupation: Novelist
- Spouse: Rod Chima
- Children: 2
- Writing career
- Language: English
- Genres: Young adult and fantasy
- Notable works: The Heir Chronicles and The Seven Realms Series
- Website: www.cindachima.com

Cinda Williams Chima (born 1952) is a New York Times bestselling author of young adult fantasy, best known for The Heir Chronicles, The Seven Realms and The Shattered Realm series.

Her Heir Chronicles young adult contemporary fantasy series was originally published by Hyperion from 2006 to 2008, with two more installments in 2013 and 2014. Her young adult high fantasy series Seven Realms was published between 2009 and 2012, and a sequel series, Shattered Realms, set in the same world only generation later, was published between 2016 and 2019. She is currently in the middle of another series, The Runstone Saga, the first book of which, Children of Ragnarok, was published in 2022.

== Early life ==
Cinda Williams was born in Springfield, Ohio in 1952. She began writing in high school before stopping to focus instead on college. She has a twin, Linda. Her fortune-telling grandmother and the Celtic magical beliefs in her native Jackson County heavily influenced her writing. She graduated from the University of Akron in 1975 with a BA in Philosophy, and in 1981 received a post-baccalaureate in Nutrition. She received her master's degree in Nutrition from Case Western Reserve University in 1984.

== Career ==
Prior to becoming a novelist, Chima was a clinical dietitian and filled several clinical management and leadership roles at the Cleveland Clinic and The MetroHealth System in Cleveland, where she directed the Clinical Nutrition Department and established the Diabetes Self-Management Program. Chima was also a freelance contributor to The Plain Dealer (Cleveland, Ohio) and other local and regional publications, focusing on health-related topics and personal essays about family life.

From 2004–2009, she was an assistant professor of nutrition at the University of Akron before leaving to write full-time.

When her sons were in their teens, she began writing again. Her efforts ended up becoming The Warrior Heir. While she was shopping around The Warrior Heir, she began a high fantasy series for adults called Star-Marked Warder. The series was never finished because the Heir Chronicles were picked up for publication, but the world of Star-Marked Warder was adapted for Chima's young adult high fantasy series Seven Realms (set a generation before) and Shattered Realms (refocusing the story on teenagers).

== Awards and honors ==
Chima's books have received starred reviews in Kirkus Reviews and VOYA, among others. They have been named Booksense and Indie Next picks, an International Reading Association Young Adult Choice, a New York Public Library Book for the Teen Age, to the Kirkus Best YA list, and the VOYA Editors' Choice, Best Science Fiction, Fantasy and Horror, and Perfect Tens lists.

She was a recipient of the 2008 Lit Award for Fiction from the Cleveland Lit and was named a Cleveland Magazine Interesting Person 2009. She has been active in the Society of Children's Book Writers and Illustrators (SCBWI) for more than five years.

== Bibliography ==
=== The Heir Chronicles ===
- The Warrior Heir (2006)
- The Wizard Heir (2007)
- The Dragon Heir (2008)
- The Enchanter Heir (2013)
- The Sorcerer Heir (2014)

=== The Seven Realms ===
- The Demon King (2009)
- The Exiled Queen (2010)
- The Gray Wolf Throne (2011)
- The Crimson Crown (2012)

=== The Shattered Realms ===
- Flamecaster (2016)
- Shadowcaster (2017)
- Stormcaster (2018)
- Deathcaster (2019)

=== The Runestone Saga ===
- Children of Ragnarok (2022)
- Bane of Asgard (2024)

== Personal life ==
She lives in Ohio with her husband, rocket scientist Rod Chima, and two sons Eric and Keith.
