= Edith Campion (actress) =

New Zealand actor, writer and poet (1923–2007)

Edith Campion MBE
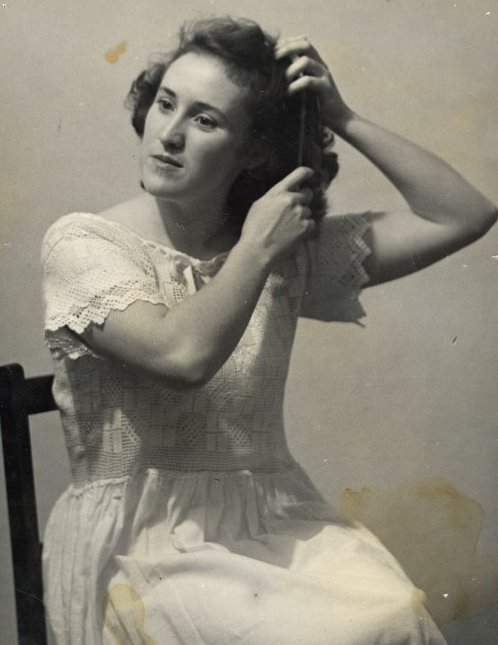
- in 1946 as "Mary Boyle" in "Juno and the Paycock"
- Born: Beverley Georgette Hannah; 13 December 1923; Wellington, New Zealand
- Died: 16 September 2007 (aged 83); Ōtaki, New Zealand
- Education: Victoria University of Wellington Old Vic Theatre School
- Occupations: Actress, writer
- Spouse: Richard Campion (m. 1945; div. 1987)
- Children: 3, including Jane Campion
- Relatives: Alice Englert (granddaughter); Sheilah Winn (cousin)

Edith Campion MBE (born Beverley Georgette Hannah; 13 December 1923 – 16 September 2007) was a New Zealand actor, writer, and a co-founder of the New Zealand Players theatre company.

== Early life ==
Campion was the only child of George Alfred Hannah (1891—1931), the youngest child of Robert Hannah and his wife Jessie McLean Hannah (née Armstrong). Robert Hannah founded the R. Hannah and Co. shoemaking business, owning shoe factories and a chain of shops throughout the country.

Her father died when she was 8 and her mother 2 years later but her maternal grandmother did not die until 1944. Campion was educated at Queen Margaret College and Nga Tawa Diocesan School as well as receiving a private education from governesses. In 1942 she attended Victoria University of Wellington. In 1945 Campion married Richard. She then travelled with him to London in 1948 to attend the Old Vic Theatre School, training as an actor.

== New Zealand Players Theatre Company ==
Campion founded the New Zealand Players Theatre Company in 1953 with her husband Richard, using some of her inheritance to finance the company. She acted numerous leading roles in many productions put on by the company and by the 1950s was regarded as one of New Zealand's pre-eminent actresses. In 1955 Campion took the lead role of Saint Joan in the play of the same name and garnered very favourable reviews. This production was also notable as Douglas Lilburn composed the incidental music for it. In 1959 Campion became a Member of the Most Excellent Order of the British Empire.

== Writing career ==
In the late 1970s Campion began writing more, producing works of fiction and of poetry. In 1977 she published A Place to Pass Through and Other Stories and in 1979 had her novella The Chain published in a co-publication called Tandem along with En Route, a novella by Frank Sargeson.

== Later life ==
She was divorced from Richard in 1987. In 1990 Campion had a cameo role in her daughter Jane's movie An Angel at My Table. Jane's 1993 film The Piano was also dedicated to her. Campion died in September 2007.
