= Beautiful Redemption (novel) =

Book by Kami Garcia

- First edition hardcover
- Author: Kami Garcia; Margaret Stohl
- Language: English
- Series: Caster Chronicles
- Genre: Young adult, Fantasy, Romance
- Publisher: Little, Brown
- Publication date: October 23, 2012
- Publication place: United States
- Pages: 464
- ISBN: 978-0-316-12353-2
- Preceded by: Beautiful Chaos

Beautiful Redemption is a 2012 young adult novel by Kami Garcia and Margaret Stohl and the final book in the Caster Chronicles series.

The book was released on October 23, 2012, by Little, Brown and Company and focuses on Lena's attempts to bring Ethan back from the dead and to deal with the aftermath of his death.

In its 2012 Y.A./Middle-Grade Book Awards, The Atlantic Wire awarded the book with the "Best Conclusion" award for having a "beautiful, powerful conclusion".

== Plot ==
Ethan Wate finds himself in the Otherworld's version of Wate's Landing, where he sees his mother, but he longs to be with Lena. To make his presence known, he creates crossword puzzles at Gatlin's local publication, The Stars & Stripes, to get his messages to Lena.

Aunt Prue tells Ethan that his death was not supposed to happen, and the only way that he can return to the Mortal world is to remove his page from The Caster Chronicles, which is held by the Keepers at the Gates of the Far Keep. To get there, he must get two "river eyes" (perfect black stones) to get across the Great River and to the Gates, where he must give the Gatekeeper "something he can't refuse."

Ethan acquires the first "river eye" from Sulla the prophet, one of the Greats. The second one was given to Lena by her great-aunt Twyla. Ethan is helped along his journey by Uncle Abner's crow, Exu; crows are the only animals capable of crossing one world to the other.

Ethan, with the help of a map that is given to him by Prue, navigates the Otherworld and meets the River Master. On reaching the other shore, Ethan meets the Gatekeeper, Xavier, who demands payment before he shows Ethan the Gates. Xavier reveals that he is a former Keeper who is condemned to be a monster and Gatekeeper for questioning Angelus's "experiments" of injecting Caster tissue and blood into himself to become immortal. Upon seeing the Book of Stars, the Light equivalent of the Book of Moons, Ethan realizes that the safest place to hide the Book of Moons is with Xavier. Making another crossword puzzle, he asks Lena to give him the Book of Moons.

Lena visits Abraham Ravenwood, the person last known to have the book. Abraham nearly kills Lena and John, but they are saved by the intervention of Macon Ravenwood and Link. To get the book to Ethan, Macon seeks out Amma. In the middle of their ritual, Genevieve Duchannes's Sheer appears and offers her help in bringing the Book to Ethan. Lena eventually gives the book to Genevieve, who in turn give it to the Greats.

Ethan, while waiting for the Book of Moons, helps Xavier catalogue his many possessions and slowly loses his memories of Lena. When the book arrives, however, his memories return. Ethan offers the book to Xavier as payment, and Xavier takes him to the Gates.

Upon entering, a Keeper tells Ethan that he must go through a labyrinth before he enters the Far Keep. In the labyrinth, he finds Sarafine surrounded by bones. As a punishment, Angelus had condemned her to be the Guardian of the labyrinth. Expressing her hatred for Angelus, she burned herself to death so that Ethan could get to the Far Keep and kill Angelus himself.

Inside the Keep, Ethan is welcomed a hero. He expresses his wish of removing his page from The Caster Chronicles. Angelus refuses and reveals that he rewrote the fates of several Casters to fulfill his plan of annihilating the Mortals and that Ethan's death was not supposed to happen. The apocalypse, which started after Lena's Seventeenth Moon, should have continued until the world was free of Mortals, but it was thwarted by the Lilum, who told Ethan what must be done to restore the Order.

Xavier appears as Ethan's friend and proposes a challenge: the one who reaches the Chronicles first will do whatever he wishes. Ethan is separated from The Caster Chronicles by a pool of water. Angelus taunts him with the body of Ethan Carter Wate, Ethan's ancestor who also tried to remove his page but failed. Ethan reminds Angelus of his own mortality, and Angelus angrily denies it. As proof, Angelus throws himself to the pool full of corpses. Thinking Angelus to be dead, Ethan finds a bridge and crosses the pool but is stopped by Angelus, who performed a Cast underwater. Ethan remembers that he has one more "river eye" and throws it at the pool. The corpses go back underwater, and Ethan reaches the island in which the Chronicles lie. Ethan removes Angelus's page from the Chronicles and causes Angelus's death. He finds his own page and removes it.

Ethan wakes up back at the water tower from where he jumped. He sees Amma going upwards and joining the Greats. To fulfill the prophecy, she had traded her life for his.

In Gatlin, the news of Amma's death is met with disbelief. Lena and Ethan spend their time together. Link and Ridley renew their on-and-off relationship, and John and Liv's relationship continues.

The book ends with Ethan offering glasses of chocolate milk to Aunt Prue, Twyla, Amma, and his mother; then, drinking his own glass, he remarks that "life has never tasted sweeter."

== Reception ==
Entertainment Weekly gives the book a "B+" and noted that it did not disappoint. The Manila Bulletin panned Beautiful Redemption as having a "lackluster ending" and stated that while all of the loose ends are tied, "it comes at the cost of what made the first three books good."
