= Falling Kingdoms =

Young adult fantasy book series

- First edition of first book in the series
- Falling Kingdoms, Rebel Spring, Gathering Darkness, Frozen Tides, Crystal Storm, Immortal Reign
- Author: Morgan Rhodes
- Country: United States
- Language: English
- Genre: Fantasy
- Publisher: Penguin Group
- Published: December 11, 2012-February 6, 2018
- Media type: Print

Falling Kingdoms is a fantasy book series for young adults by Morgan Rhodes. It follows the lives of four teenagers: Cleo of Auranos, Jonas of Paelsia, and Magnus and Lucia of Limeros. The series begins after a shocking murder plunges Limeros and Paelsia into a war against Auranos.

Falling Kingdoms, the first novel of the series, was published in 2012, followed by Rebel Spring (2014), Gathering Darkness (2014), Frozen Tides (2015), Crystal Storm (2016), and finally Immortal Reign (2018), which concludes the series.

In 2015, a spin-off series was launched with A Book of Spirits and Thieves, followed by The Darkest Magic (2016). In August 2018, Rhodes announced that the third book in the series, The Cursed Heir, is "indefinitely delayed" due to failing sales of the previous books.
