= Kami Garcia =

American writer

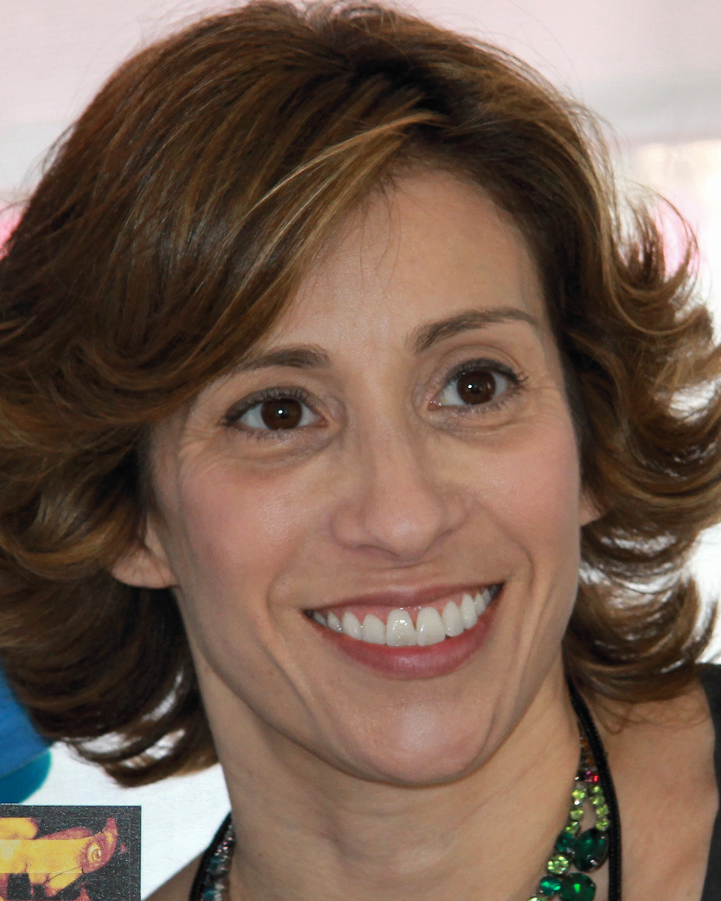
- Garcia at the 2013 Texas Book Festival
- Born: Kami Marin; March 25, 1972 (age 54)
- Occupation: Writer
- Spouse: Max Garcia
- Relatives: Robert Marin (father)
- Writing career
- Language: English
- Period: 2009–present
- Genres: Children's fantasy, science fiction, adventure novels
- Notable works: Beautiful Creatures; The Lovely Reckless

Kami Garcia (born March 25, 1972) is an American writer. She is known for writing young adult fiction and graphic novels for DC Comics.

== Life ==
She grew up in the Washington, D.C. area, but currently resides in Los Angeles, California. Garcia is a teacher and reading specialist with an MA in education, and leads book groups for children and teenagers. She formerly taught in the Washington D.C. area until she moved to Los Angeles. In addition to teaching, she was a professional artist.

== Career ==
=== Caster Chronicles series ===
She is the co-author along with her friend Margaret Stohl of the Caster Chronicles book series, starting with Beautiful Creatures. The series currently consists of four books and a novella and is generally classified as a contemporary young adult fantasy novel, with particular interest for teens. It is set in the fictional small town of Gatlin, South Carolina in the Southern United States, and deals with a group of townspeople, friends, witches (called "Casters" in the books), and numerous other magical creatures.

The first book, Beautiful Creatures reached International Bestseller Status and is on The New York Times Best Seller list. It has been published in 50 countries and translated into 39 languages. It was made into the 2013 film Beautiful Creatures and has also been turned into a graphic novel.

=== Graphic novels ===
Garcia and Brazilian artist Gabriel Picolo have created four Teen Titans young adult graphic novels for DC Comics. The graphic novels have told stories about Teen Titans characters Raven and Beast Boy.

== Personal life ==
She is married to Alex Garcia, a video game producer. They have two children together.

== Bibliography ==
=== Novels ===
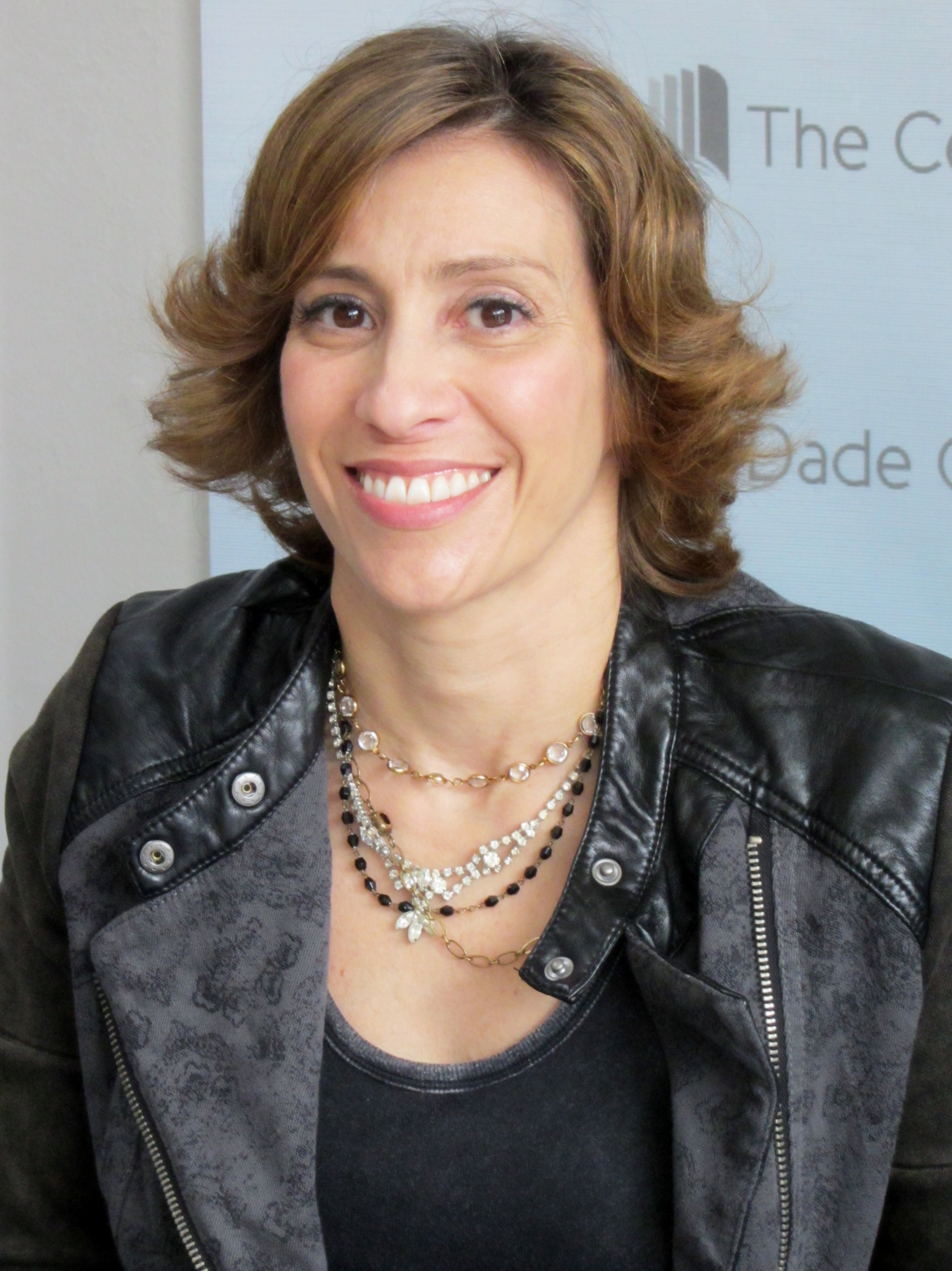
Garcia at the Miami Book Fair International 2014

- Broken Beautiful Hearts (2018; Imprint) – ISBN 978-1250079206
- The Lovely Reckless (2016; Imprint) – ISBN 978-1250129680

==== The X-Files Origins ====
- The X-Files Origins #1: Agent of Chaos (2017; Imprint) – ISBN 978-1250119568

==== Caster Chronicles series ====
1. Beautiful Creatures (2009) – ISBN 978-0-316-23168-8
2. Beautiful Darkness (2010) – ISBN 978-0-316-12917-6
3. Dream Dark (2011) e-novella only
4. Beautiful Chaos (2011) – ISBN 978-0-316-19306-1
5. Beautiful Redemption (2012) – ISBN 978-0-316-21460-5

==== Dangerous Creatures series (Caster Chronicles spin-offs) ====
1. Dangerous Dream (2013) e-novella only
2. Dangerous Creatures (2014) – ISBN 978-0-316-37031-8
3. Dangerous Deception (2015) – ISBN 978-0-316-38363-9

==== Legion series ====
1. Unbreakable. Little, Brown Books for Young Readers. 1 October 2013. ISBN 978-0-316-21020-1.
2. Unmarked. Little, Brown Books for Young Readers. 30 September 2014. ISBN 978-0-316-21022-5.

=== Short stories ===
- "Red Run", published in Enthralled: Paranormal Diversions (2011) – ISBN 978-0-062-01579-2
- "Improbable Futures"

=== Graphic novels ===
==== Teen Titans ====
- Teen Titans: Raven (2019; DC Ink) – ISBN 978-1401286231
- Teen Titans: Beast Boy (2020; DC Ink) – ISBN 978-1401287191
- Teen Titans: Beast Boy Loves Raven (2021; DC Ink) – ISBN 978-1779514882
- Teen Titans: Robin (2023; DC Ink) - ISBN 1779512244
- Teen Titans: Starfire (2024; DC Ink) - ISBN 978-1779517999
- Teen Titans: Together (2026; DC Ink) - ISBN 9781799503064

=== Comic books ===
- Joker/Harley: Criminal Sanity #1 - #8 (October 9, 2019 – April 7, 2021)

== Awards ==
Year	Award	Category	Nominated work	Result	Ref
2014	Bram Stoker Awards	BSA–Young Adult	Unbreakable	Nominated	
2015	Bram Stoker Awards	BSA–Young Adult	Unmarked	Nominated	
2022	Bram Stoker Awards	BSA–Graphic Novel	Joker/Harley: Criminal Sanity	Nominated	
