= Alden Ehrenreich =

American actor (born 1989)

- Ehrenreich at TIFF in 2026
- Born: Alden Caleb Ehrenreich; November 22, 1989 (age 36); Los Angeles, California, U.S.
- Education: New York University (attended)
- Occupation: Actor
- Years active: 2005–present

Alden Caleb Ehrenreich (/ˈɛrənraɪk/; born November 22, 1989) is an American actor. He began his career by appearing in the television series Supernatural (2005), and in Francis Ford Coppola's films Tetro (2009) and Twixt (2011). Following supporting roles in the 2013 films Blue Jasmine and Stoker, his breakthrough came in 2016 with a lead role in the Coen brothers' comedy Hail, Caesar!, for which he gained praise.

Ehrenreich played Han Solo in Solo: A Star Wars Story (2018) and starred in the dystopian television series Brave New World (2020). In 2023, he had starring roles in the comedy Cocaine Bear and the thriller Fair Play, and a supporting role in Christopher Nolan's biographical film Oppenheimer. In 2025, he had supporting roles in the superhero miniseries Ironheart as Zeke Stane, and in the horror film Weapons. In 2026, he made his Broadway debut in Becky Shaw, winning the Tony Award for Best Featured Actor in a Play.

== Early life ==
Alden Caleb Ehrenreich was born on November 22, 1989, in Los Angeles, California, the only child of Sari (née Newmann), an interior designer, and Mark Ehrenreich, an accountant. He is named after the director Phil Alden Robinson, a family friend. His stepfather, Harry Aronowitz, is an orthodontist. Ehrenreich is Jewish; his ancestors were Jewish emigrants from Austria, Hungary, Russia, and Poland, and he was raised in Reconstructionist Judaism.

Ehrenreich began acting at the Palisades Elementary School in Pacific Palisades, Los Angeles, and continued doing so at Crossroads School in Santa Monica, California. After graduating from high school, he studied acting at New York University at the Stella Adler Studio of Acting, but never finished his degree. In 2009, he co-founded "The Collectin" with his friend Zoë Worth, a group of New York City actors, writers, producers and directors who collaborate on films and theater performances.

== Career ==
Ehrenreich was discovered at a friend's bat mitzvah reception by Steven Spielberg, who watched a comedy video created by Ehrenreich and a friend, "which began in the present and eventually cut to 20 or 30 years later, with Mr. Ehrenreich, in a kimono, screaming to stop a wedding." Ehrenreich has described the comedic performance he gave in the movie as, "I ran around as a skinny little punk, trying on girls' clothes and eating dirt." He was then contacted by DreamWorks, a studio which Spielberg helped found, and met with its casting director. Spielberg said of Ehrenreich:

[He] was in a bat mitzvah video that my daughter acted with him in for their best friend. They showed me the video and I loved it and I got him an agent. That's sort of how it all began ... I thought he had a lot of promise in comedy ... I didn't know he was going to rogue [into] drama. He was so funny in this video, I thought, "I have found the next really funny comedian." But most of his choices have been in drama and people don't know how really funny he is.

The meeting with Spielberg led to acting roles on television shows such as Supernatural and CSI: Crime Scene Investigation.

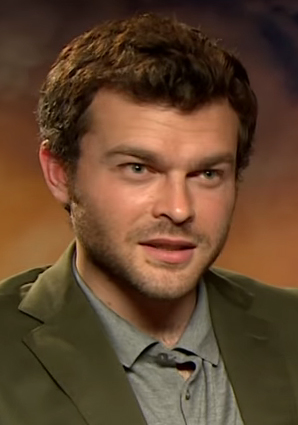
Ehrenreich in 2018

In 2007, Ehrenreich won the role of Bennie Tetrocini in Francis Ford Coppola's Tetro. Coppola asked Ehrenreich to read a passage from The Catcher in the Rye for his main audition. The film was released in limited release in 2009 and received generally positive reviews from critics, who praised Ehrenreich's performance. In 2011, he played a minor role in Coppola's subsequent film Twixt and appeared alongside Natalie Portman in the Sofia Coppola-directed Miss Dior Cherie commercial.

In 2013, he starred as Ethan Wate in the film adaptation of the novel Beautiful Creatures, and appeared as Whip Taylor in Park Chan-wook's thriller film Stoker. He then played the stepson of Cate Blanchett in the Woody Allen-directed drama film Blue Jasmine. In 2016, Ehrenreich became more widely known for his co-leading role as Hobie Doyle in the Coen brothers film Hail, Caesar!, alongside a cast that included Josh Brolin and George Clooney. Many critics praised Ehrenreich's performance in particular. That same year, Ehrenreich starred in the leading role of Frank Forbes in Warren Beatty's romantic comedy-drama Rules Don't Apply. He then starred in The Yellow Birds with Tye Sheridan, Jack Huston, and Jennifer Aniston, which premiered at the 2017 Sundance Film Festival.

Ehrenreich starred as Han Solo in the Star Wars anthology film Solo: A Star Wars Story (2018), following Solo's early life before the events of the original 1977 Star Wars. He headlined the Brave New World series on NBC, based on the 1932 novel of the same name by Aldous Huxley.

Ehrenreich's recent projects include the thriller Fair Play co-starring Phoebe Dynevor, Cocaine Bear, directed by Elizabeth Banks, Oppenheimer, directed by Christopher Nolan, and played Ezekiel Stane in the Marvel Cinematic Universe miniseries Ironheart.

In 2024, he joined Zach Cregger's horror thriller film Weapons (2025). He also joined Anton Corbijn's Switzerland, alongside Helen Mirren, and The Last Resort with Daisy Ridley.

In 2026, he was cast as Max Garrett in the 2026 Broadway revival of Gina Gionfriddo's play, Becky Shaw. The production opened on April 6, 2026 at the Helen Hayes Theatre and Ehrenreich won the Tony Award for Best Featured Actor in a Play and the Drama Desk Award for Outstanding Featured Performance in a Play for his performance, while also being nominated for the Drama League Award for Distinguished Performance.

== Acting credits ==
=== Film ===
Key
†	Denotes works that have not yet been released

Year	Title	Role	Director(s)	Notes
2009	Tetro	Bennie Tetrocini	Francis Ford Coppola	
2010	Somewhere	Actor at Party	Sofia Coppola	Uncredited
2011	Twixt	Flamingo	Francis Ford Coppola	
2013	Beautiful Creatures	Ethan Wate	Richard LaGravenese	
2013	Stoker	Whip Taylor	Chan-wook Park	
2013	Blue Jasmine	Danny Francis	Woody Allen	
2013	Teenage	1940s Teenager	Matt Wolf	Documentary
2016	Hail, Caesar!	Hobie Doyle	Joel Coen & Ethan Coen	
2016	Rules Don't Apply	Frank Forbes	Warren Beatty	
2017	The Yellow Birds	John Bartle	Alexandre Moors	
2018	Solo: A Star Wars Story	Han Solo	Ron Howard	
2023	Fair Play	Luke	Chloe Domont	
2023	Cocaine Bear	Eddie	Elizabeth Banks	
2023	Oppenheimer	Senate Aide	Christopher Nolan	
2025	Weapons	Paul Morgan	Zach Cregger	
2026	A Talent for Murder	Edward Ridgeway	Anton Corbijn	
2027	The Last Resort †	Ben	Donald Petrie	Post-production
2028	Miami Vice '85 †		Joseph Kosinski	Filming

=== Television ===
Year	Title	Role	Notes
2005	Supernatural	Ben Collins	Episode: "Wendigo"
2006	CSI: Crime Scene Investigation	Sven	Episode: "Built to Kill, Part 2"
2020	Brave New World	John the Savage	Main role, 9 episodes
2025	Ironheart	Joe McGillicuddy / Ezekiel "Zeke" Stane	Miniseries, 5 episodes
2025	The American Revolution	Joseph Plumb Martin (voice)	Miniseries, 5 episodes

=== Theater ===
Year	Title	Role	Venue	Ref.
2026	Becky Shaw	Max Garrett	Hayes Theater, Broadway	

=== Video games ===
Year	Title	Role	Notes
2017	Star Wars Battlefront II	Han Solo	Voice and likeness. Content based on Solo: A Star Wars Story

=== Music videos ===
Year	Title	Artist(s)
2026	"Don't Leave Me on the Dance Floor"	Carly Rae Jepsen

== Awards and nominations ==
Year	Association	Category	Project	Result
2013	Teen Choice Awards	Choice Movie Actor: Romance	Beautiful Creatures	Nominated
2013	Teen Choice Awards	Choice Movie: Liplock (shared with Alice Englert)	Beautiful Creatures	Nominated
2016	Chicago Film Critics Association Awards	Best Supporting Actor	Hail, Caesar!	Nominated
2016	Detroit Film Critics Society Awards	Best Supporting Actor	Hail, Caesar!	Nominated
2016	IndieWire Critics' Poll Awards	Best Supporting Actor	Hail, Caesar!	Nominated
2016	San Diego Film Critics Society Awards	Breakthrough Artist	Hail, Caesar!	Nominated
2016	San Diego Film Critics Society Awards	Best Comedic Performance	Hail, Caesar!	Nominated
2016	Georgia Film Critics Association Awards	Breakthrough Actor	Hail, Caesar! and Rules Don't Apply	Nominated
2018	Teen Choice Awards	Choice Summer Movie Actor	Solo: A Star Wars Story	Nominated
2026	Tony Awards	Best Featured Actor in a Play	Becky Shaw	Won
2026	Drama League Awards	Distinguished Performance	Becky Shaw	Nominated
2026	Drama Desk Awards	Outstanding Featured Performance in a Play	Becky Shaw	Won
2026	New York Drama Critics' Circle Awards	Best Individual Performance	Becky Shaw	Won
2026	Dorian Awards	Outstanding Featured Performance in a Broadway Play	Becky Shaw	Won
