= List of ethnic origins of New Zealanders =

In the most recent New Zealand census, in 2018, 70.2 per cent of the population identified as European and 16.5 per cent as Māori. Other major pan-ethnic groups include Asians (15.1 per cent) and Pacific peoples (8.1 per cent). Middle Eastern, Latin American and African ethnicities constitute a small remainder (1.5 per cent) of the population. When completing the census people could select more than one ethnic group and this list includes all of the stated ethnic groups if more than one is chosen.

New Zealand's ethnic diversity can be attributed to its history and location. For example, the country's colonisation by the UK is a core reason for its Western values and culture.

== Terminology ==
The New Zealand census invites respondents to identify with an ethnic group.

There are six major ethnic groupings:

- European New Zealanders (Pākehā) are a European ethnic group. It includes New Zealanders of European descent, European peoples (e.g. British, Scottish, Irish, Dutch, German, Russian, Italian, Greek), and other peoples of indirect European descent (e.g. Americans, Canadians, Australians and South Africans,).
- Māori are the indigenous people of New Zealand.
- Pacific peoples (Pasifika) originate from other islands in the Pacific, including from the Cook Islands, Niue, and Tokelau, all of which are dependent states of New Zealand, as well as other places like Tuvalu, Palau, The Pitcairn Islands and Fiji.
- Asian New Zealanders are a pan-ethnic group deriving from various nations in the Asian continent, such as Chinese, Japanese, Koreans, Indians, Filipinos, Vietnamese or their descendants.
- Middle Eastern, Latin American, African (MELAA), and Caribbean ethnicities constitute a very small remainder of the population.
- "Other" is a grouping of ethnic groups which do not fit into the other five top-level ethnic groups.

=== Handling multiple ethnicities ===
Many respondents identify with multiple ancestries. Outputting data on multiple ethnicities is normally handled one of two ways: total response or prioritised ethnicity. For this list, the total response method is used.

Total response counts people of multiple ethnicities in each ethnic groups in which they identify. While this shows all the people that identify with a particular ethnicities, the sum of all ethnic group populations adds to more than the total population. For example, a person who identifies as New Zealand European and Māori would be counted twice, once under each ethnicity, under total response output.

Prioritised ethnicity counts people with multiple ethnicities in the highest-priority single ethnic group in which they identify. The order of priority for ethnicity, from highest to lowest, is Māori, Pacific peoples, Asian, MELAA, other and European. While it has the advantage that the sum of all ethnic groups equals the total population, the preferential order can cause ethnic groups to be overrepresented or underrepresented, and may categorise a person differently from their self-identified primary ethnicity. For example, a person who identifies as New Zealand European and Māori would be counted under the Māori ethnic group under prioritised ethnicity output.

Comparison of different methods of handling multiple ethnicites, 2023 census data
Ethnic group	Single/combination		Total response		Prioritised	
Ethnic group	Number	%	Number	%	Number	%
European	2,790,354	55.9	3,383,742	67.8	2,790,354	55.9
Māori	366,015	7.3	887,493	17.8	887,493	17.8
Pacific peoples	277,002	5.5	442,632	8.9	348,957	7.0
Asian	782,646	15.7	861,576	17.3	831,402	16.6
Middle Eastern/Latin American/African	72,588	1.5	92,760	1.9	85,986	1.7
Other	44,763	0.9	56,133	1.1	49,623	1.0
European–Māori	409,401	8.2				
European–Pacific	58,215	1.2				
European–Asian	44,142	0.9				
Māori–Pacific	44,796	0.9				
Two ethnic groups, not elsewhere included	37,446	0.7				
European–Māori–Pacific	43,908	0.9				
Three ethnic groups, not elsewhere included	19,401	0.4				
Four or more ethnic groups	3,234	0.1			3,234	0.1
Total responses	4,993,923	100.0	5,724,336	114.6	4,993,923	100.0
Total population	4,993,923	100.0	4,993,923	100.0	4,993,923	100.0

== Ethnicities ==
Only ethnicities with 1,000 or more responses at the 2023 census are included individually:

Code	Ethnicity	Ethnic group	Responses		
Code	Ethnicity	Ethnic group	2013	2018	2023
11111	New Zealand European	European	2,727,009	3,013,440	3,099,858
21111	Māori	Māori	598,605	775,836	887,493
42100	Chinese nfd	Asian	163,101	231,387	259,755
43100	Indian nfd	Asian	143,520	221,916	255,261
31111	Samoan	Pacific	144,138	182,721	213,069
41111	Filipino	Asian	40,350	72,612	108,297
33111	Tongan	Pacific	60,333	82,389	97,824
32100	Cook Islands Māori nfd	Pacific	61,077	80,532	94,176
12114	English	European	38,916	72,204	68,517
12948	South African European	European	28,656	37,155	48,930
61118	New Zealander	Other	65,973	45,330	42,684
44311	Korean	Asian	30,171	35,664	38,944
34111	Niuean	Pacific	23,883	30,867	34,944
12211	Dutch	European	28,503	29,820	30,948
12811	Australian	European	22,467	29,349	30,591
36111	Fijian	Pacific	14,445	19,722	25,038
43112	Fijian Indian	Asian	10,929	15,132	23,808
10000	European nfd	European	26,472	34,632	21,834
12116	Irish	European	14,193	17,835	21,261
12119	Scottish	European	14,412	18,627	19,767
44211	Japanese	Asian	14,118	18,141	19,488
12943	American	European	12,339	16,245	18,606
12711	German	European	12,810	16,818	17,565
52100	Latin American nfd	MELAA	5,622	9,798	15,861
44111	Sinhalese	Asian	1,017	9,171	14,436
41311	Vietnamese	Asian	6,660	10,086	14,157
41415	Thai	Asian	8,052	10,623	12,858
40000	Asian nfd	Asian	4,623	11,811	12,645
12100	British nfd	European	36,024	11,607	12,021
41211	Cambodian	Asian	8,601	9,672	11,514
51100	Middle Eastern nfd	MELAA	4,380	8,268	10,245
35111	Tokelauan	Pacific	7,173	8,676	9,822
52113	Brazilian	MELAA	2,868	6,663	9,216
43116	Sikh	Asian	213	192	9,111
61117	Other South African	Other	255	6,816	8,919
12945	Canadian	European	5,871	7,797	8,910
44411	Afghani	Asian	3,417	5,250	8,721
12924	French	European	4,593	7,677	8,451
41000	Southeast Asian nfd	Asian	1,272	6,219	8,235
42116	Taiwanese	Asian	5,715	6,570	8,163
44414	Pakistani	Asian	3,261	6,135	8,094
12935	Russian	European	5,979	7,713	8,040
41412	Indonesian	Asian	4,137	6,033	7,614
44413	Nepalese	Asian	1,590	3,630	6,948
37144	Tuvaluan	Pacific	3,537	4,653	6,585
12611	Italian	European	3,798	5,352	6,444
53100	African nfd	MELAA	6,822	7,221	6,402
12949	Afrikaner	European	1,197	789	6,069
42113	Malaysian Chinese	Asian	1,848	4,866	5,865
12121	Welsh	European	3,708	4,971	5,724
51115	Iranian/Persian	MELAA	3,198	4,425	5,613
44100	Sri Lankan nfd	Asian	9,561	4,245	5,100
41414	Malaysian	Asian	4,797	3,729	4,797
37124	Kiribati	Pacific	2,115	3,225	4,659
44112	Sri Lankan Tamil	Asian	732	3,501	4,221
43115	Punjabi	Asian	324	459	4,152
52114	Chilean	MELAA	1,686	2,886	4,083
12511	Croatian	European	2,673	2,946	3,609
44412	Bangladeshi	Asian	1,623	2,337	3,552
42111	Hong Kong Chinese	Asian	222	3,177	3,501
41411	Burmese	Asian	2,187	2,475	3,453
12411	Polish	European	2,163	2,871	3,360
12939	Spanish	European	2,043	2,773	3,162
12941	Swiss	European	2,388	2,649	2,880
52111	Argentinian	MELAA	726	1,824	2,826
12311	Greek	European	2,478	2,475	2,823
53127	Other Zimbabwean	MELAA		1,068	2,760
51117	Israeli/Jewish	MELAA	1,353	1,854	2,757
51112	Arab	MELAA	2,919	2,994	2,640
12999	European nec	European	2,637	1,968	2,562
12920	Danish	European	1,986	2,214	2,496
51116	Iraqi	MELAA	2,583	2,688	2,490
53119	Somali	MELAA	1,617	1,701	2,376
43119	South African Indian	Asian		1,632	2,340
30000	Pacific Peoples nfd	Pacific	1,026	2,724	2,271
52115	Colombian	MELAA	654	1,620	2,226
41499	Southeast Asian nec	Asian	723	1,638	2,223
61199	Other ethnicity nec	Other	150	4,017	2,163
12942	Ukrainian	European	852	1,281	2,151
53121	Ethiopian	MELAA	1,242	1,635	2,151
12940	Swedish	European	1,401	1,911	2,127
37140	Tahitian	Pacific	1,407	1,737	2,019
52123	Mexican	MELAA	711	1,425	1,965
12919	Czech	European	1,083	1,740	1,953
53199	African nec	MELAA	1,158	1,005	1,929
51120	Lebanese	MELAA	1,044	1,278	1,878
41413	Laotian	Asian	1,374	1,608	1,860
51114	Egyptian	MELAA	1,110	1,533	1,854
12926	Hungarian	European	1,365	1,638	1,788
51127	Turkish	European	957	1,320	1,779
12932	Portuguese	European	942	1,365	1,746
61113	Indigenous American	Other	750	1,278	1,623
12950	Zimbabwean European	European	1,617	1,872	1,497
42112	Cambodian Chinese	Asian	132	1,413	1,467
12933	Romanian	European	1,452	1,485	1,437
12931	Norwegian	European	810	1,131	1,410
53115	Nigerian	MELAA	291	636	1,365
12514	Serbian	European	1,056	1,284	1,347
12913	Austrian	European	1,029	1,272	1,338
37138	Rotuman	Pacific	783	981	1,323
44416	Eurasian	Asian	1,365	1,389	1,296
37135	Papua New Guinean	Pacific	807	1,131	1,290
53118	Caribbean	MELAA	807	1,047	1,284
37112	Indigenous Australian	Pacific	453	795	1,161
37145	Ni Vanuatu	Pacific	492	990	1,161
41417	Chin	Asian		834	1,110
51113	Assyrian	MELAA	1,497	1,293	1,101
53116	African American	MELAA	510	855	1,083
43114	Indian Tamil	Asian	300	315	1,074
99999	Not specified^{a}		230,646	0	

- nfd – Not Further Defined (insufficient data to classify the response further)
- nec – Not Elsewhere Classified (when no category exists for the response)
- a – Includes Don't Know, Refused to Answer, Response Unidentifiable, Response Outside Scope and Not Stated
- MELAA – Middle Eastern, Latin American and African

== Ethnic groups by area ==
Ethnic groups by regional council area, 2023 census

=== By region ===
Region	European		Maori		Pacific		Asian		MELAA		Other	
Region	Num.	%	Num.	%	Num.	%	Num.	%	Num.	%	Num.	%
Northland	141,594	73.0	72,612	37.4	9,486	4.9	9,345	4.8	1,263	0.7	2,208	1.1
Auckland	825,144	49.8	203,544	12.3	275,079	16.6	518,178	31.3	44,718	2.7	15,144	0.9
Waikato	357,624	71.7	125,574	25.2	26,139	5.2	60,792	12.2	7,146	1.4	5,742	1.2
Bay of Plenty	240,087	71.9	102,387	30.6	14,202	4.3	29,262	8.8	3,954	1.2	3,558	1.1
Gisborne	28,905	56.5	28,029	54.8	2,841	5.6	1,968	3.8	381	0.7	468	0.9
Hawke's Bay	128,415	73.3	50,076	28.6	10,902	6.2	11,361	6.5	1,398	0.8	2,118	1.2
Taranaki	105,366	83.6	27,411	21.8	3,234	2.6	7,215	5.7	699	0.8	1,719	1.4
Manawatu-Whanganui	196,431	78.1	63,177	25.1	12,522	5.0	19,329	7.7	1,836	1.0	3,339	1.3
Wellington	378,429	72.6	80,613	15.5	47,349	9.1	79,314	15.2	11,934	2.3	5,823	1.1
North Island	2,401,995	63.1	753,423	19.3	401,754	10.6	736,764	19.3	74,166	1.9	40,119	1.1
Tasman	52,416	90.7	5,745	9.9	1,509	2.6	2,298	4.0	435	0.8	915	1.6
Nelson	44,544	84.7	6,252	11.9	1,485	2.8	4,533	8.6	714	1.4	705	1.3
Marlborough	42,450	85.9	7,344	14.9	1,821	3.7	2,667	5.4	738	1.5	744	1.5
West Coast	29,964	89.7	4,491	13.5	540	1.6	1,335	4.0	180	0.5	723	2.2
Canterbury	522,498	80.3	69,060	10.6	23,868	3.7	86,430	13.3	10,299	1.6	8,205	1.3
Otago	205,224	85.2	23,910	9.9	8,274	3.4	20,379	8.5	5,211	2.2	3,207	1.3
Southland	84,195	84.1	16,848	16.8	3,351	3.3	7,152	7.1	1,014	1.0	1,509	1.5
South Island	981,291	82.8	133,650	10.5	40,848	3.4	124,794	10.5	18,591	1.6	16,008	1.4
New Zealand	3,383,742	67.8	887,493	19.8	442,632	8.9	861,576	17.3	92,760	1.9	56,133	1.1

==== In images ====
European from 2006 to 2018

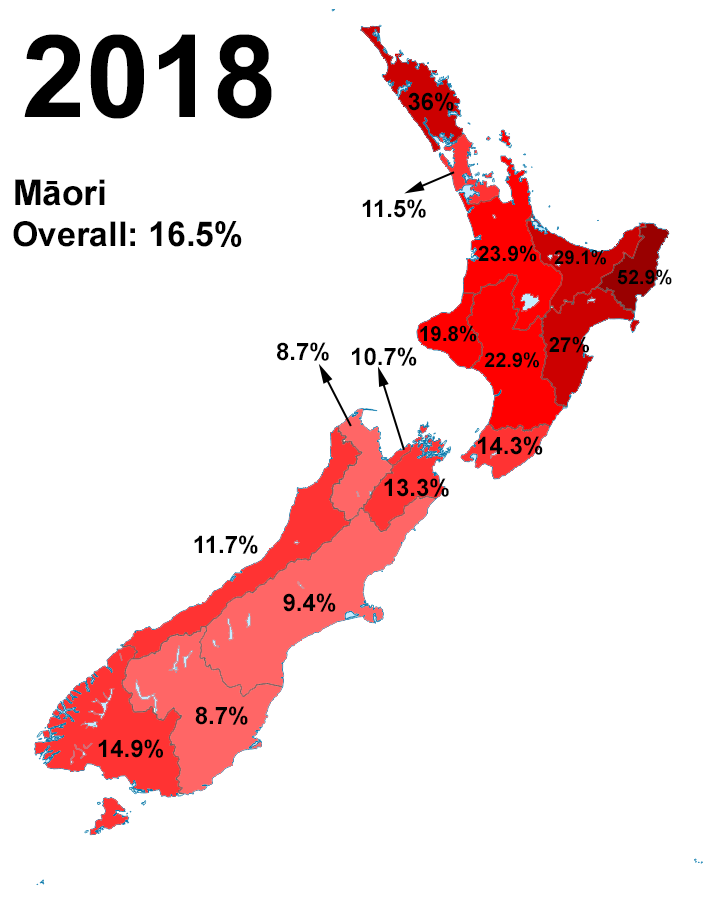
Māori in 2018

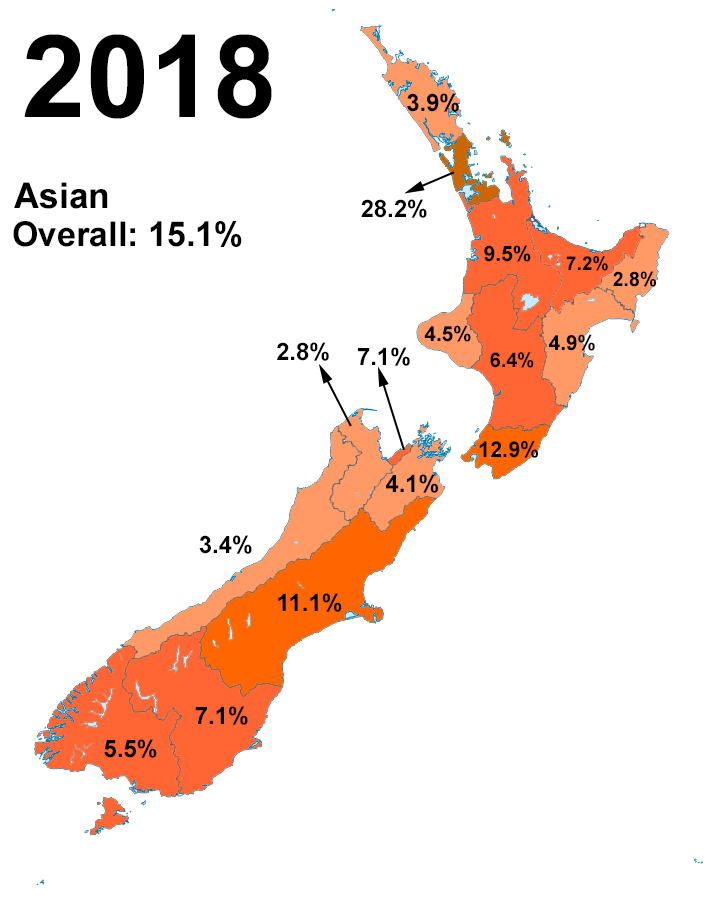
Asian in 2018

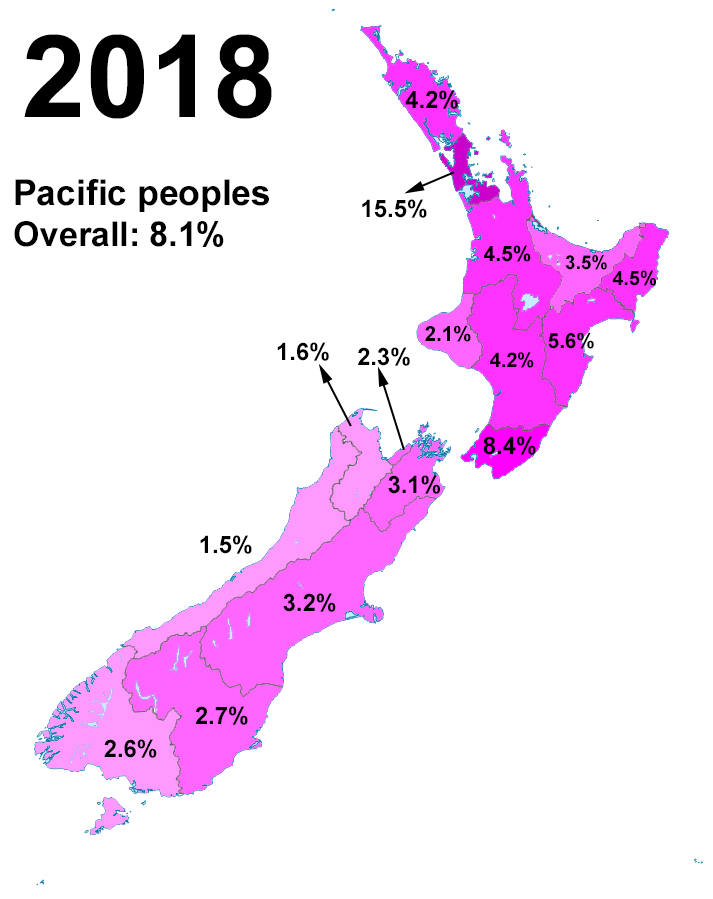
Pacific peoples in 2018

=== By territorial authority and Auckland local board ===
Territorial authority or Auckland local board	European		Māori		Pacific		Asian	
Territorial authority or Auckland local board	Num.	%	Num.	%	Num.	%	Num.	%
Far North district	46,131	64.6	35,679	49.9	3,834	5.4	2,265	3.2
Whangarei district	73,776	76.3	30,351	31.4	4,398	4.5	6,153	6.4
Kaipara district	21,687	83.7	6,579	25.4	1,254	4.8	927	3.6
Auckland	825,144	49.8	203,544	12.3	275,079	16.6	518,178	31.3
Auckland – Rodney local board area	66,204	84.9	9,543	12.2	3,324	4.3	7,341	9.4
Auckland – Hibiscus and Bays local board area	86,598	75.9	8,169	7.2	2,790	2.4	23,436	20.6
Auckland – Upper Harbour local board area	37,794	49.1	4,713	6.1	2,418	3.1	34,983	45.5
Auckland – Kaipātiki local board area	49,785	56.5	8,328	9.4	5,835	6.6	30,669	34.8
Auckland – Devonport-Takapuna local board area	38,493	66.4	3,603	6.2	1,695	2.9	16,842	29.0
Auckland – Henderson-Massey local board area	54,420	43.6	22,629	18.1	27,669	22.2	39,546	31.7
Auckland – Waitākere Ranges local board area	37,737	70.0	7,452	13.8	7,104	13.2	9,405	17.4
Auckland – Aotea/Great Barrier local board area	1,122	89.7	285	22.8	27	2.2	21	1.7
Auckland – Waiheke local board area	8,061	88.0	1,125	12.3	333	3.6	417	4.6
Auckland – Waitematā local board area	48,819	59.9	6,876	8.4	4,725	5.8	25,692	31.5
Auckland – Whau local board area	30,522	37.6	8,913	11.0	16,050	19.7	34,332	42.2
Auckland – Albert-Eden local board area	56,025	58.0	8,322	8.6	8,343	8.6	31,953	33.1
Auckland – Puketāpapa local board area	18,261	32.1	3,795	6.7	8,931	15.7	28,701	50.4
Auckland – Ōrākei local board area	56,937	68.4	5,316	6.4	3,072	3.7	22,215	26.7
Auckland – Maungakiekie-Tāmaki local board area	32,973	42.2	11,013	14.1	20,190	25.9	23,370	29.9
Auckland – Howick local board area	58,503	38.1	9,717	6.3	12,339	8.0	80,565	52.5
Auckland – Māngere-Ōtāhuhu local board area	14,466	18.4	13,302	16.9	47,463	60.4	15,408	19.6
Auckland – Ōtara-Papatoetoe local board area	12,678	14.6	13,749	15.8	42,381	48.7	30,792	35.4
Auckland – Manurewa local board area	24,213	24.5	24,858	25.2	39,450	39.9	27,249	27.6
Auckland – Papakura local board area	26,541	36.7	17,811	24.6	14,811	20.5	24,732	34.2
Auckland – Franklin local board area	64,986	77.0	14,019	16.6	6,129	7.3	10,509	12.5
Thames-Coromandel district	28,287	88.4	6,003	18.8	789	2.5	1,143	3.6
Hauraki district	17,829	83.6	5,139	24.1	777	3.6	969	4.5
Waikato district	63,252	73.6	23,088	26.9	4,704	5.5	7,821	9.1
Matamata-Piako district	30,903	83.3	6,888	18.6	981	2.6	2,547	6.9
Hamilton city	102,180	58.5	44,445	25.4	11,862	6.8	39,798	22.8
Waipa district	50,748	86.5	9,303	15.9	1,332	2.3	3,552	6.1
Ōtorohanga district	7,944	76.3	3,384	32.5	330	3.2	453	4.4
South Waikato district	17,271	69.0	9,585	38.3	3,378	13.5	1,248	5.0
Waitomo district	6,000	62.6	4,341	45.3	426	4.4	477	5.0
Taupo district	30,198	74.9	12,453	30.9	1,479	3.7	2,625	6.5
Western Bay of Plenty district	45,003	80.1	12,111	21.6	1,899	3.4	4,113	7.3
Tauranga city	120,345	78.7	29,562	19.3	5,430	3.6	15,726	10.3
Rotorua district	45,588	61.6	32,199	43.5	4,716	6.4	7,443	10.1
Whakatane district	23,145	62.3	18,054	48.6	1,431	3.9	1,590	4.3
Kawerau district	4,053	53.8	4,764	63.2	357	4.7	252	3.3
Ōpōtiki district	5,013	49.7	6,678	66.2	456	4.5	318	3.2
Gisborne district	28,905	56.5	28,029	54.8	2,841	5.6	1,968	3.8
Wairoa district	4,140	46.9	6,048	68.5	375	4.2	150	1.7
Hastings district	60,132	69.9	24,435	28.4	7,320	8.5	6,513	7.6
Napier city	51,096	79.0	15,651	24.2	2,724	4.2	4,224	6.5
Central Hawke's Bay district	12,987	83.9	3,903	25.2	483	3.1	456	2.9
New Plymouth district	73,092	84.0	17,358	20.0	2,199	2.5	5,727	6.6
Stratford district	9,156	90.2	1,587	15.6	177	1.7	345	3.4
South Taranaki district	23,265	80.2	8,496	29.3	861	3.0	1,152	4.0
Ruapehu district	9,009	68.8	5,979	45.7	456	3.5	474	3.6
Whanganui district	37,284	78.3	13,566	28.5	1,965	4.1	2,415	5.1
Rangitikei district	12,468	79.6	4,422	28.2	867	5.5	462	2.9
Manawatu district	28,521	88.0	5,946	18.3	897	2.8	1,089	3.4
Palmerston North city	64,239	73.8	18,042	20.7	5,169	5.9	12,498	14.4
Tararua district	15,678	84.0	5,013	26.9	495	2.7	585	3.1
Horowhenua district	29,091	79.3	10,149	27.7	2,667	7.3	1,797	4.9
Kapiti Coast district	48,438	86.6	8,826	15.8	2,097	3.8	3,468	6.2
Porirua city	35,733	60.1	13,668	23.0	15,753	26.5	6,834	11.5
Upper Hutt city	35,853	78.4	7,650	16.7	2,991	6.5	5,460	11.9
Lower Hutt city	69,168	64.3	21,072	19.6	13,125	12.2	19,977	18.6
Wellington city	146,208	72.1	19,878	9.8	11,565	5.7	41,436	20.4
Masterton district	23,163	83.7	6,267	22.6	1,260	4.6	1,413	5.1
Carterton district	9,222	91.2	1,428	14.1	234	2.3	312	3.1
South Wairarapa district	10,638	90.1	1,821	15.4	324	2.7	411	3.5
Tasman district	52,416	90.7	5,745	9.9	1,509	2.6	2,298	4.0
Nelson city	44,544	84.7	6,252	11.9	1,485	2.8	4,533	8.6
Marlborough district	42,450	85.9	7,344	14.9	1,821	3.7	2,667	5.4
Kaikoura district	3,669	87.0	801	19.0	42	1.0	165	3.9
Buller district	9,459	90.6	1,362	13.0	177	1.7	348	3.3
Grey district	12,309	90.7	1,662	11.8	192	1.4	564	4.0
Westland district	7,758	87.2	1,470	16.5	174	2.0	420	4.7
Hurunui district	12,309	90.5	1,368	10.1	177	1.3	636	4.7
Waimakariri district	61,008	92.1	6,546	9.9	1,065	1.6	2,547	3.8
Christchurch city	296,955	75.9	44,022	11.2	16,746	4.3	67,050	17.1
Selwyn district	65,682	84.1	7,050	9.0	1,869	2.4	8,877	11.4
Ashburton district	28,185	81.1	3,000	8.6	2,097	6.0	3,273	9.4
Timaru district	41,508	87.3	4,953	10.4	1,650	3.5	2,772	5.8
Mackenzie district	4,323	84.5	447	8.7	75	1.5	459	9.0
Waimate district	7,176	88.4	708	8.7	123	1.5	531	6.5
Chatham Islands territory	444	72.5	420	68.6	24	3.9	12	2.0
Waitaki district	19,941	85.0	2,241	9.5	1,293	5.5	1,626	6.9
Central Otago district	21,819	89.8	2,319	9.5	591	2.4	1,089	4.5
Queenstown-Lakes district	39,594	82.8	3,060	6.4	696	1.5	5,001	10.5
Dunedin city	109,635	85.1	13,914	10.8	5,037	3.9	11,961	9.3
Clutha district	15,912	86.9	2,538	13.9	675	3.7	828	4.5
Southland district	27,465	86.3	4,137	13.0	453	1.4	2,409	7.6
Gore district	11,040	86.9	1,953	15.4	273	2.1	504	4.0
Invercargill city	45,687	82.2	10,764	19.4	2,625	4.7	4,242	7.6
New Zealand	3,383,742	67.8	887,493	17.8	442,632	8.9	861,576	17.3

== See also ==
- Demographics of New Zealand
