= Lebanese New Zealanders =

Total population
- 1,278 Lebanese-born (2018 Census)

Regions with significant populations
- Auckland and Wellington

Languages
- Arabic (Lebanese Arabic), English (New Zealand English)

Religion
- Majority: Christian: Maronite Catholic, Greek Orthodox, Greek Catholic, Protestant Minority: Islam: Shia Islam, Sunni Islam, Alawite, Jewish and Druze

Related ethnic groups
- Lebanese British, Lebanese Americans, Lebanese Canadians, Lebanese Australians

Lebanese New Zealanders refers to citizens or permanent residents of New Zealand of Lebanese ancestry. The community is diverse, having a large Christian religious base, being mostly Maronite Catholics and Greek Orthodox, while also having a small Muslim group of both the Shia and Sunni branches of Islam. By the late 1980s, an estimated 5,000 New Zealanders were of Lebanese descent, meaning there are likely at least 8,000 to 12,000 Lebanese New Zealanders today.

Lebanon, in both its modern-day form as the Lebanese state (declared in 1920, granted independence in 1943) and its historical form as the region of the Lebanon, has been a source of migrants to New Zealand for over two centuries. According to 2018 census, 1,278 Lebanese-descent people in New Zealand, with most of all people with Lebanese ancestry living in Auckland Region (46.0 percent), followed by the Wellington Region (21.8 percent), and the Otago Region (8.5 percent). Furthermore, 71.4 percent were born in New Zealand, up from 68.4 percent in 2013.

== History ==
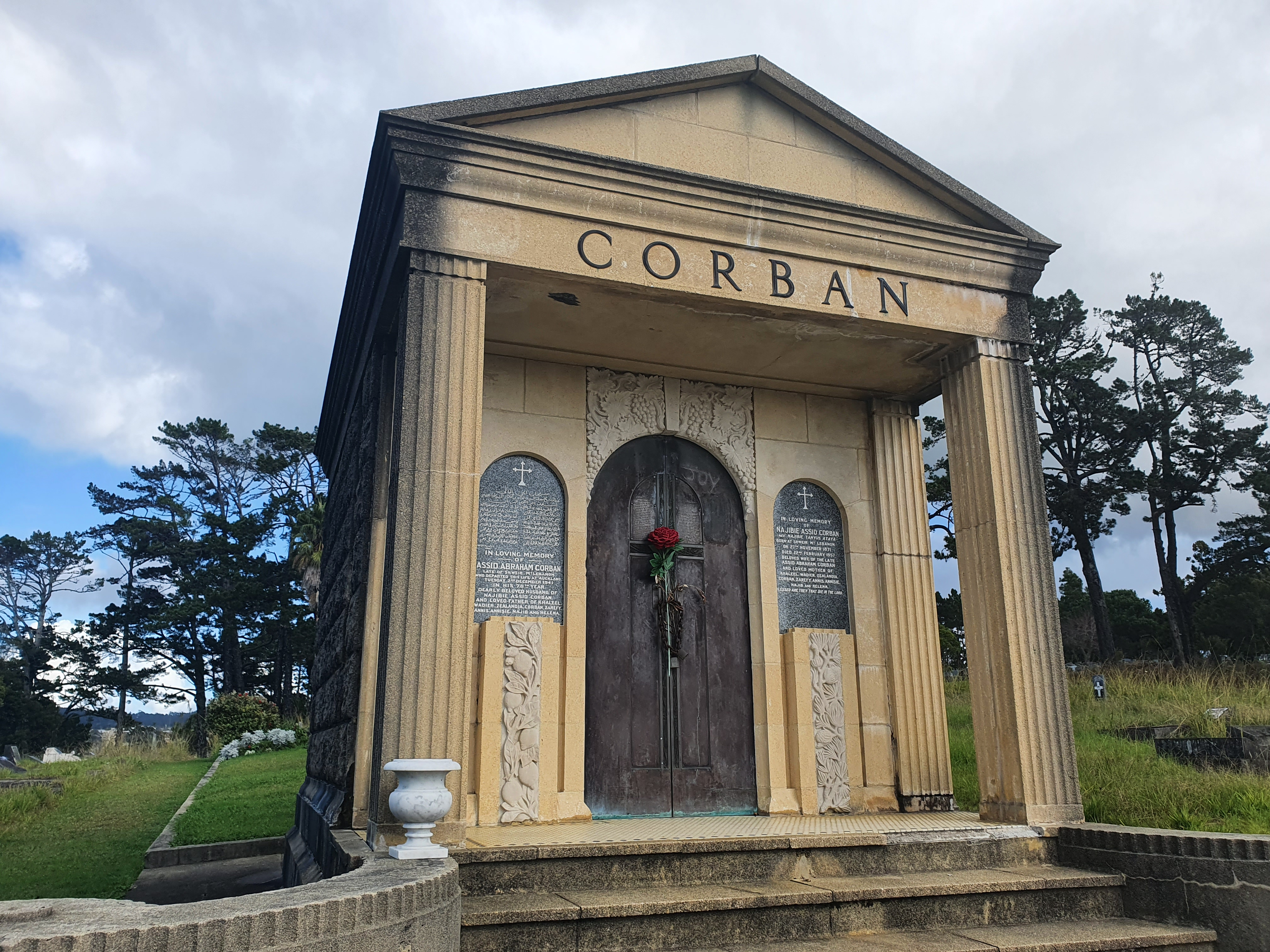
The Corban family mausoleum in Waikumete Cemetery, Glen Eden

As part of a large scale emigration in the 1840s, numerous Lebanese (mostly Christians) migrated in great numbers out of Lebanon to various destinations. Most emigrated to Brazil and other Latin American nations, particularly Argentina, Venezuela, Colombia and Ecuador. Many also went to the United States, Canada, the United Kingdom, or the United Arab Emirates and others to Australia and New Zealand.

Thus, New Zealand's Lebanese population is one of the older established non-English speaking minorities in the country (though many Lebanese people now speak English, to a greater or lesser extent).

In the 1890s, there were increasing numbers of Lebanese immigrants to New Zealand, part of the mass emigration from the area of the Lebanon that would become the modern Lebanese state, and also from the Anti-Lebanon Mountains region of the border area with Syria.

Some Lebanese people had settled in Auckland as early as 1890. The Lebanese blended into the community and attended local churches. Their language ability and entrepreneurial skills, along with a sense of belonging, gave them the confidence to integrate without losing their tradition and culture connection.

Early Lebanese settler Assid Abraham Corban and his family were instrumental in introducing commercial winemaking to New Zealand. The Corban family migrated to West Auckland from Dhour El Choueir in 1892, establishing Corbans Wines at Henderson in 1902.

== Religious diversity ==
Religious affiliation of Lebanese New Zealanders (2018 census)
1. Christianity (53.8%)
2. Islam (6.60%)
3. Judaism (0.20%)
4. No religion (31.0%)
5. Declined to answer (5.90%)
6. Other (2.50%)

In New Zealand, 53.8% of Lebanese are Christian, while a minority (6.6%) are Muslim. 31.0 percent said they had no religion.

All main Lebanese religious groups — Christians, including Maronites, Greek Orthodox, Melkites, Protestants, Muslims, including Shi'a and Sunnis denominations; Druze, amongst others — are now represented.

== Notable Lebanese New Zealanders ==
- Assid Abraham Corban, wine-maker
- Ben Ellis, rugby league footballer
- Ranginui Walker, writer

== See also ==
- Lebanese diaspora
- Immigration to New Zealand
- Lebanese Australians
- Egyptian New Zealanders
- Iraqi New Zealanders
- Syrian New Zealanders
- Jewish New Zealanders
- Arab New Zealanders
