= Iraqi New Zealanders =

Total population
- 6,024 Iraq-born

Regions with significant populations
- Wellington, Auckland

Languages
- New Zealand English and Iraqi Arabic also Kurdish (Sorani and Kurmanji dialects), Turkish (Iraqi Turkmen/Turkoman dialects), Neo-Aramaic (Assyrian and Mandaic), and Hebrew

Religion
- Predominantly Christianity (mostly Eastern Orthodox and Eastern Catholic) and Islam; Minority: Judaism and Mandaeism

Related ethnic groups
- Arabs, Armenians, Assyrians, Azerbaijanis, Iranians, Mizrahi Jews, Turks, Mandaeans; Some descendants of New Zealanders

Iraqi New Zealanders constitute a small population immigrants from Iraq and New Zealand-born people of Iraqi heritage or descent.

The 2006 census found that 6024 New Zealanders were born in Iraq, although the figure of Iraqi New Zealanders will be higher than this as many New Zealand-born children of Iraqis may consider themselves to be Iraqi New Zealanders. The majority of Iraqi New Zealanders came to New Zealand as skilled migrants during the 1990s and many were Assyrian Christians who had been persecuted for their religion. The greatest concentrations of Iraqis are in Auckland and Wellington.

Many Iraqi Christians (predominantly ethnic Chaldeans, Assyrians and Syriacs) live in the North Shore region of Auckland city. These are mainly highly educated Christians who were from Baghdad, the capital of Iraq, and Basra city in the south of Iraq, but originally heiling from Mosul. They came under the skilled migrant point system category in the mid 1990s. Many of these have settled in the Unsworth Heights and Albany suburbs. The North Shore Iraqi community is one of the fastest growing middle eastern communities in New Zealand. Many Iraqi immigrants had trouble working in their professional fields as there was a lack of employment during the early 1990s; however, by the late 2000s, many had established their own private businesses from private medical clinics to industrial firms.

== See also ==
- Arab diaspora
- Assyrian diaspora
- Arab New Zealanders
- Iranian New Zealanders
- Lebanese New Zealanders
- Syrian New Zealanders
