= Syrian New Zealanders =

Total population
- 1,300 (estimated); 156 (Syrian ancestry) (2013 Census); 393 (Syrian-born) (2013 Census); 750 additional Syrian refugees (2017)

Languages
- New Zealand English, Syrian Arabic

Religion
- Islam, Christianity and Jewish minorities

Related ethnic groups
- Other Arab New Zealanders, Syrian people, Lebanese New Zealanders

Syrian New Zealanders refer to New Zealanders of Syrian descent or Syria-born people who reside in the New Zealand.

== History ==
Syrians have been migrating to New Zealand since at least the 1920s. The 1921 New Zealand census counted 338 Syrians. 393 Syrian-born people were counted in the 2013 census. Due to the Syrian Civil War, many Syrians have been made refugees since 2011. The New Zealand government has taken in 750 Syrian refugees and will increase its intake of Syrians. The majority of Syrians in New Zealand are refugees of the Syrian Civil War. The New Zealand government is working to double its refugee quota to be able to take in more Syrian refugees.

== See also ==
- Syrian diaspora
- Arab New Zealanders
- Lebanese New Zealanders
