= African New Zealanders =

Ethnic group of New Zealand

Total population
- 15,849 (2018); 0.3% of New Zealand's population

Regions with significant populations
- Auckland Region, Wellington Region

Languages
- New Zealand English, languages of Africa

Religion
- Christianity, Islam, Traditional African religions

New Zealanders of sub-Saharan African descent represent less than 0.3% of New Zealand's population, although the number has been growing substantially since the 1990s.

In the early 20th century, a small number of sub-Saharan African students and professionals came to New Zealand to study or work. In the 1960s and 1970s, larger numbers of sub-Saharan African immigrants arrived in New Zealand, including refugees from countries such as Zambia, Uganda, and Zimbabwe.

Today, African New Zealanders make up a small but growing portion of the New Zealand population. According to the 2018 New Zealand census, there were 16,890 people in New Zealand who identified as being of sub-Saharan African ancestry.

== History ==
The history of African New Zealanders dates back to the late 19th century, when the first sub-Saharan African immigrants arrived in the country. These early immigrants were mostly students and professionals who came to New Zealand to study or work.

In the early 20th century, sub-Saharan African immigration to New Zealand remained relatively small, with only a handful of sub-Saharan African students and professionals coming to the country each year. In the 1960s and 1970s, however, larger numbers of sub-Saharan African immigrants began to arrive in New Zealand, including refugees from countries such as Zambia, Uganda, and Zimbabwe.

In the 1980s and 1990s, sub-Saharan African immigration to New Zealand continued to increase with many sub-Saharan African immigrants settling in the larger cities of Auckland and Wellington most of the immigrants being refugees, these refugees often arrived with few possessions and had experienced traumatic events in their home countries. Many came from countries in crisis, such as Ethiopia, Rwanda, Somalia, and Zimbabwe, where wars and brutal political regimes had driven thousands from their homes.

== Culture ==
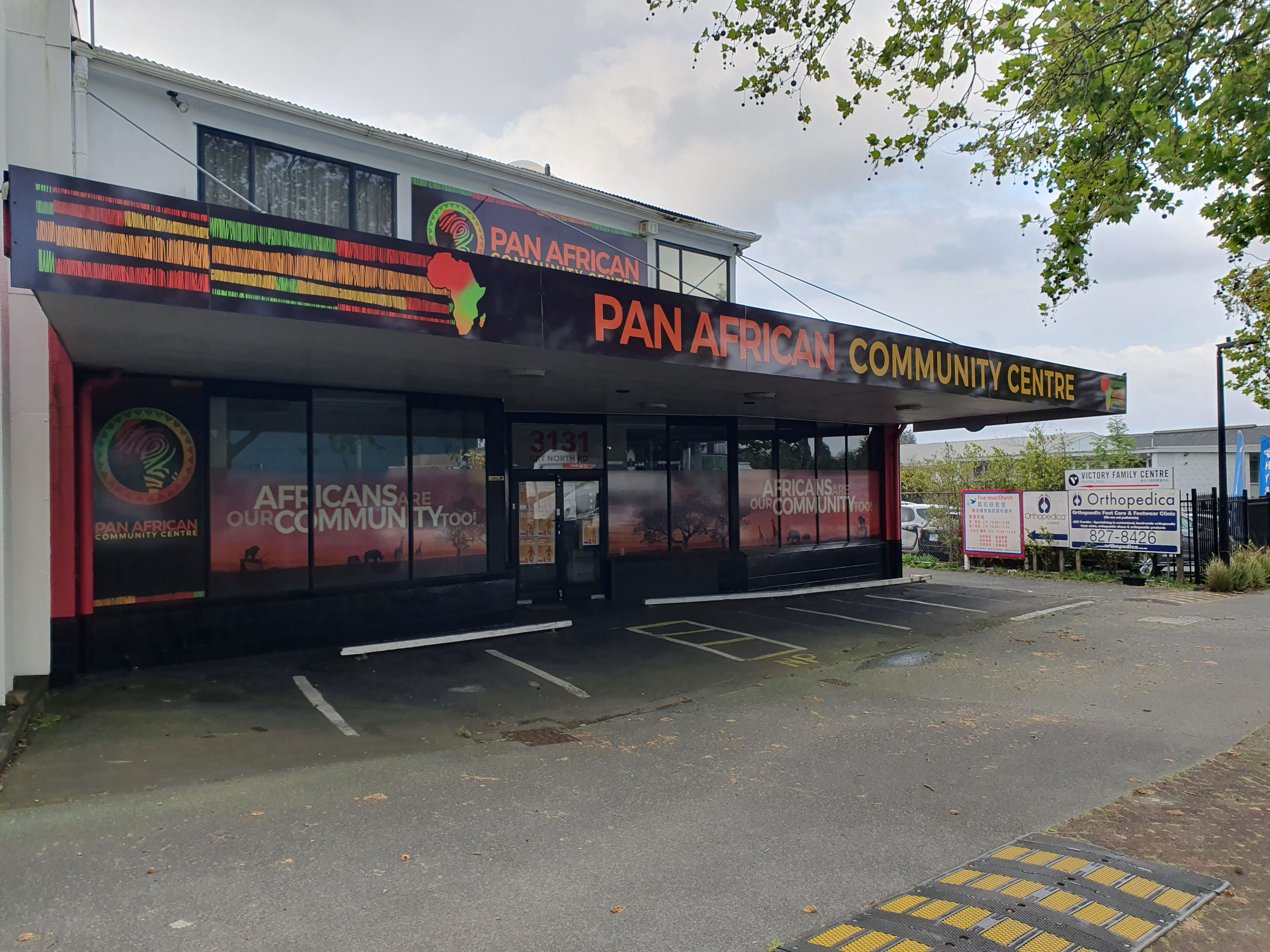
The Pan African Community Centre in New Lynn, West Auckland

African New Zealanders are a diverse and multicultural community, with a wide range of experiences and backgrounds. Their cultural traditions and practices are shaped by the diverse countries and regions from which they or their ancestors come, as well as by their experiences living in New Zealand.

African New Zealanders have a wide variety of cultural practices and traditions, including music, dance, art, food, and dress. Many African New Zealanders participate in cultural events and festivals that celebrate their heritage and traditions, such as the Africa Day Festival, which is held each year in Auckland to celebrate the diversity of sub-Saharan African culture.

== Notable African New Zealanders ==
- Colin de Grandhomme - Zimbabwean-born cricket player for the New Zealand national cricket team
- Addil Somani (born 1967), Ugandan-born cricketer
- Alan Blake (1922–2010), rugby player of African-American descent
- David Nyika (born 1995), boxer of Ugandan descent
- Devon Conway (born 1990), cricketer playing for New Zealand
- Rex Mason, politician, Attorney General of New Zealand (1935–1949)
- Grace Nweke (born 2002), netball player of Nigerian descent
- Gus Nketia (born 1970), Ghanaian-born track and field athlete
- Ibrahim Omer (born 1979), Eritrean-born Member of Parliament for the Labour Party.
- Zoë Robins, actress of Nigerian descent
- Israel Adesanya (born 1989), Nigerian-born mixed martial artist
- JessB, rapper of Kenyan descent
- John da Silva (1934–2021), wrestler of Brazilian descent
- Lesley-Anne Brandt (born 1981), South African-born actress
- Mazbou Q (born 1989), UK-born New Zealand-based Nigerian hip hop artist
- Meryl Cassie (born 1984), South African-born actress
- Nneka Okpala (born 1988), athlete of Nigerian descent
- Steve Maina (born 1970), Kenyan-born Anglican bishop
- Precious McKenzie (born 1936), South African-born weightlifter
- Penny Hulse, local politician, Deputy Mayor of Auckland (2010–2016)
- Tamupiwa Dimairo (born 1996), Zimbabwean-born footballer
- Tawanda Manyimo (born 1981), Zimbabwean-born actor
- Terefe Ejigu (born 1988), Ethiopian-born long-distance runner
- Kwabena Appiah (born 1992), footballer
- Gareth Evans - player for Hawkes Bay and the Hamilton Chiefs in Super Rugby

== See also ==
- List of ethnic origins of New Zealanders
- Immigration to New Zealand

== Bibliography ==
- African Youth Health and Well-Being: Participatory Action Research Project. Evolve and Victoria University, 2005.
