= Egypt–New Zealand relations =

- Egypt: New Zealand

Egypt–New Zealand refers to the bilateral relations between Egypt and New Zealand.

== History ==
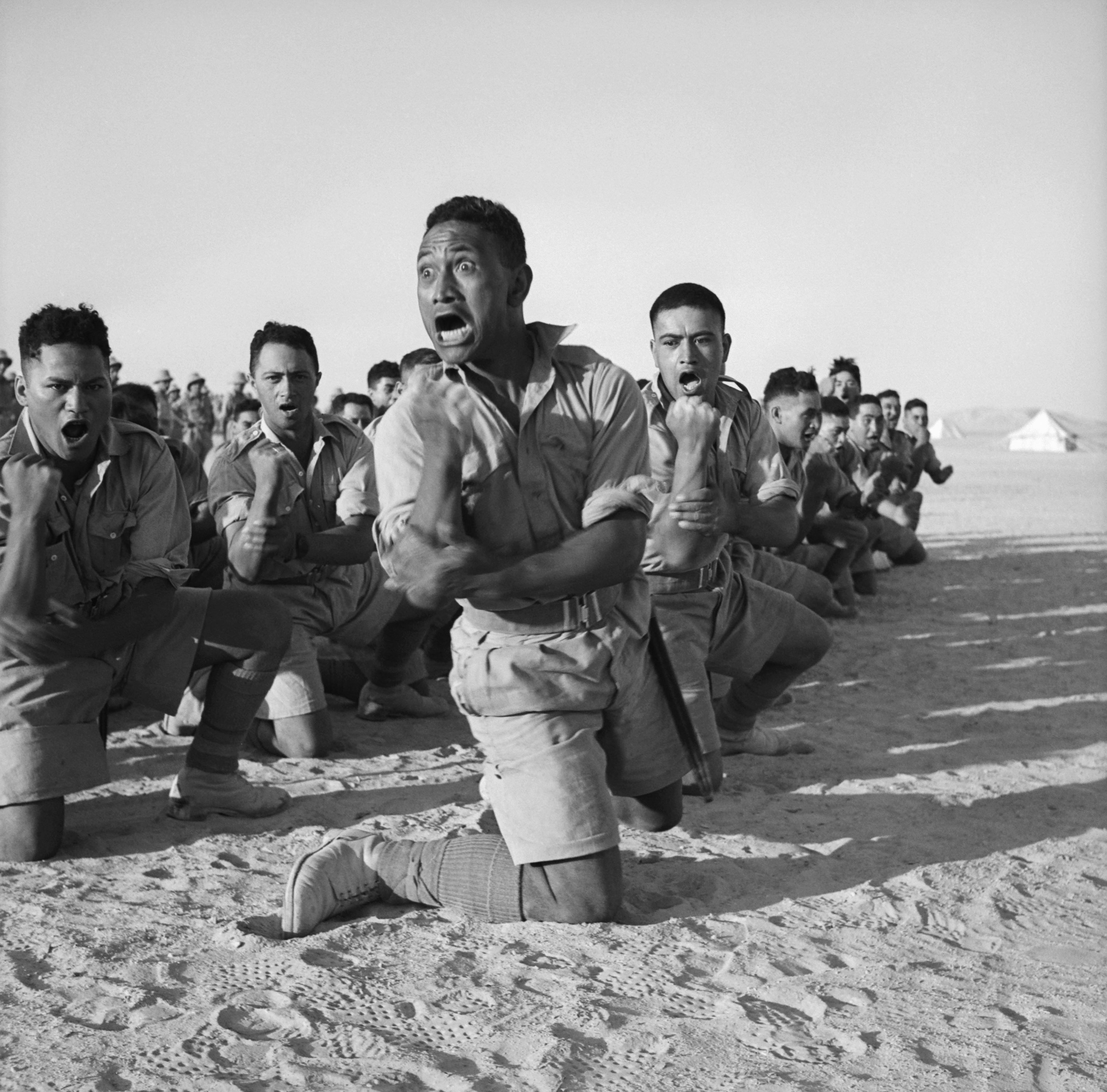
New Zealand soldiers from the Māori Battalion performing the Haka in Helwan, Egypt; 1941

Egypt and New Zealand share a brief common history in the fact that both nations formed part of the British Empire. The first official contact between Egypt and New Zealand was during World War I when in October 1914, troops from the New Zealand Expeditionary Force landed in Egypt and assisted in repulsing an Ottoman attack on the Suez Canal in February 1915. During the war, New Zealand forces partook in the Senussi Campaign and Sinai and Palestine Campaigns. After the war, in February 1922, Egypt obtained its independence from the United Kingdom after the issuance of the Unilateral Declaration of Egyptian Independence.

During World War II, New Zealand forces returned to Egypt to fight against both German and Italian incursions in Egypt and known as the Western Desert Campaign. In May 1941, New Zealand Prime Minister Peter Fraser paid a visit to Egypt to visit with his country's troops and personnel. New Zealand troops partook in several battles within Egypt including the first and second Battles of El Alamein in 1942 which turned the tide of the North African wars and ended the Axis threat to Egypt and the Suez Canal.

In 1947, New Zealand obtained its independence from the United Kingdom after the passing of the Statute of Westminster Adoption Act. In 1974, diplomatic relations were established between Egypt and New Zealand and in 1975, Egypt opened an embassy in Wellington, however, the Egyptian embassy was closed in 1988 after New Zealand did not reciprocate the gesture. In November 2007, during a visit of Prime Minister Helen Clark to Egypt, New Zealand opened an embassy in Cairo. Egypt opened an embassy in Wellington in 2014.

Since 1981, New Zealand has been a member of the Multinational Force and Observers, whose mission is to supervise the implementation of the security provisions of the Egypt–Israel peace treaty signed in 1979. There are currently 28 New Zealand soldiers based in Egypt. In February 2011, New Zealand evacuated its citizens from Egypt after the removal of Egyptian President Hosni Mubarak during the Arab Spring. In January 2015, New Zealand Foreign Minister Murray McCully visited Egypt and met with President Abdel Fattah el-Sisi.

== Trade ==
In 2015, trade between Egypt and New Zealand totaled US$341 million. Egypt's main exports to New Zealand include: vehicles, apparel, carpets and fertilizer. New Zealand exports to Egypt include: Dairy products, eggs, honey, edible products and products of animal origin. Egypt is New Zealand's third largest trading partner in Africa.

== Resident diplomatic missions ==
- Egypt has an embassy in Wellington.
- New Zealand has an embassy in Cairo.

== See also ==
- Foreign relations of Egypt
- Foreign relations of New Zealand
- Egyptian New Zealanders
- Māori Battalion
