= Assid Corban =

New Zealand politician

Assid Corban OBE JP

1st Mayor of Waitakere City
- In office 1989–1992
- Preceded by: new office
- Succeeded by: Bob Harvey

4th Mayor of Henderson Borough
- In office 1974–1989
- Preceded by: Reginald Keeling
- Succeeded by: position abolished

Personal details
- Born: Assid Khaleel Corban; 1 February 1925
- Died: 16 September 2018 (aged 93)
- Spouse: Miriam Khouri (m. 1948)
- Children: Four (1 son, 3 daughters)

Assid Khaleel Corban OBE JP (1 February 1925 – 16 September 2018) was a New Zealand local-body politician and company director. He was the first Mayor of Waitakere City and previously Mayor of the Henderson Borough Council.

== Biography ==
=== Early life ===
Corban was descended from Assid Abraham Corban, who emigrated in 1892 to New Zealand from Lebanon and in 1902 established the first commercial vineyard in New Zealand. In 1948, Assid Corban married Miriam Khouri, and the couple went on to have four children. Corban worked as an orchid grower, and as a director of Corbans Wines.

=== Political career ===
Corban was first elected as a councillor for Henderson Borough Council in 1956–1959, and again in 1965–1971. In 1971–1974, he held the position of Deputy Mayor, and he was elected Mayor of Henderson Borough Council in 1974. He held that position until the 1989 local government reforms when Henderson became part of the newly formed Waitakere City. As mayor, Corban oversaw the development of Henderson Square, a large-scale shopping centre (now known as WestCity Waitakere).

In 1989, Corban was elected as the first Mayor of Waitakere City, winning against former Waitemata City mayor Tim Shadbolt. He held the position for one term until 1992. He was then elected as a councillor to Waitakere City 1998–2001, and from 2007 to 2010.

In the 2010 local elections, he successfully stood for both the Henderson-Massey Local Board and the Waitakere Licensing Trust Ward 4 – Henderson.

== Community involvement ==
Corban was a longstanding member of the New Zealand Orchid Society and the Auckland Horticultural Council.

== Honours and awards ==
In 1977, Corban was awarded the Queen Elizabeth II Silver Jubilee Medal. In the 1988 Queen's Birthday Honours, he was appointed an Officer of the Order of the British Empire, for services to local government and the community. In 1990, both Assid and Miriam Corban received the New Zealand 1990 Commemoration Medal. Miriam Corban also was awarded the New Zealand Suffrage Centennial Medal in 1993, and in the 1999 Queen's Birthday Honours she was appointed a Companion of the Queen's Service Order for community service.

== Death ==
Corban died aged 93 of cancer on 16 September 2018 and was buried at Waikumete Cemetery in West Auckland on 25 September 2018. His wife, Miriam Corban, died in 2021.
