= Shirefie Coory =

New Zealand businesswoman and matriarch

- Born: c. 1865; Bsharri, Ottoman Empire
- Died: 18 March 1950
- Occupation: Businesswoman

Shirefie Coory (c.1865–18 March 1950) was a New Zealand businesswoman and matriarch. She was born in Bsharri, in the Ottoman Empire in about c.1865.
