= Arab New Zealanders =

Arab New Zealanders النيوزيلنديون العرب
Total population
- 12,000

Regions with significant populations
- Auckland, Wellington, Christchurch

Languages
- Arabic, New Zealand English

Religion
- 75.7% Muslims; 9.7% Christianity; 7.8% No religion

Related ethnic groups
- Arabs, Arab diaspora, Arab Australians, Arab Americans, Arab Argentines, Arab Brazilians, Arab Canadians, Arab Mexicans, British Arabs, Arabs in Germany

Arab New Zealanders refers to people from Arab countries, particularly Lebanon, Syria, Palestine, Iraq, and Jordan and also small groups from Egypt, Algeria, Tunisia, Morocco, Libya, Yemen and Sudan, who emigrated from their native nations and currently reside in New Zealand. The term also refers to descendants of diasporic Arabians such as descendants of Arab merchants to Asian nations, whose ancestral origins may be traced to merchants hailing from the Southern Arabian nations such as Yemen and Oman and the Arab nations of the Persian gulf region. Most Arab New Zealanders are of Lebanese and Iraqi descent because they were the first Arabs to arrive in New Zealand. Therefore, an Arab New Zealander is a New Zealander of Arab cultural and linguistic heritage or identity whose ancestry traces back to any of various waves of immigrants originating from one or more of the twenty countries comprised by the Arab world.

== History ==
People from the Arab world have been migrating in numbers to New Zealand since the 1900s beginning with those from Lebanon. In 1936 there were 1,261 people of Lebanese origin in New Zealand; it has been estimated that in the early 1980s the descendants of Lebanese totalled 5,000. Many assimilated and moved to other parts of the country. In the 1890s there was a move to introduce legislation that would stop Lebanese migration and ban those already resident from peddling goods. This proved successful and few migrants arrived from Lebanon as a result.

== Today ==
Recently Iraqis in New Zealand have replaced Lebanese, of which there are approximately 1,000 as the most common Arab migrant group with more than 6,500 settling mostly in the main centres. Statistics show that nearly 15,000 Middle Eastern immigrants (including those of Persian origin) moved to New Zealand since 1997. However, New Zealanders with an ethnic Arab background are likely to be greater in number, since many migrants have had children in New Zealand. Many of these migrants have entered under the humanitarian category when seeking residence in New Zealand.

== Religion ==
The Lebanese brought with them different Christian and Muslim faiths. The three main Christian followings are Maronites, Eastern Orthodox and Melkites (Greek Catholics). The three main Muslim followings are Shia, Sunni and Druze. Many of the other Arab people however follow mainly Islam, and it is thought that more than half of all migrants from the Arab world are Muslim.

== Notable people ==
- Bobby Chinn, chef
- Ben Ellis (rugby league) (born 1982), former rugby league footballer
- Shirefie Coory (c.1865–1950), businesswoman
- Assid Corban (1925–2018), politician
- Joe Karam (born 1951), New Zealand former rugby footballer
- Ranginui Walker (1932–2016), academic and author
- Assid Abraham Corban (1864–1941), viticulturist and wine-maker

== See also ==
- Immigration to New Zealand
- Iraqi New Zealanders
- Arab Australians
- Arab diaspora
- Lebanese diaspora
- Syrian diaspora
- Iraqi diaspora
- Refugees of Iraq
- Refugees of the Syrian Civil War
