= Addil Somani =

New Zealand cricketer

Adil Somani
Personal information
- Born: 22 October 1967 (age 59); Kampala Uganda
- Batting: Right-handed
- Bowling: Right-arm leg break

Domestic team information
- Years: Team
- 1987: Nottinghamshire
- 1988/89–1993/94: Northern Districts

Career statistics
Competition	First-class	List A
Matches	8	5
Runs scored	177	44
Batting average	17.70	11.00
100s/50s	0/0	0/0
Top score	40	15
Balls bowled	583	66
Wickets	9	3
Bowling average	37.55	16.00
5 wickets in innings	0	0
10 wickets in match	0	0
Best bowling	2/7	2/16
Catches/stumpings	0/–	2/–
- Source: Cricinfo, 30 September 2010

Addil Somani (born 22 October 1967) is a Ugandan-born former cricketer. Somani was a right-handed batsman who bowled leg breaks and played top-level cricket in both England and New Zealand. He was born at Kampala.

Somani's first-class debut came for English county side Nottinghamshire in 1987, against Oxford University, which was his only first-class match for the county side.

In 1989, he made his debut in New Zealand for Northern Districts against Canterbury. Between the 1988/89 and 1993/94 seasons, he represented Northern Districts in 7 first-class matches, the last of which came against Wellington. In his 8 career first-class matches, he scored 177 runs at a batting average of 17.70, with a high score of 40. With the ball he took 9 wickets at a bowling average of 37.55, with best figures of 2/7.

He made his List A debut for Northern Districts in the 1993/94 season against Otago. During that season he represented the team in 5 List-A matches, the last of which came against Wellington. In his 5 List-A matches, he scored 44 runs at an average of 11.00, with a high score of 15. With the ball he took 3 wickets at an average of 16.00, with best figures of 2/16.
