= Assid Abraham Corban =

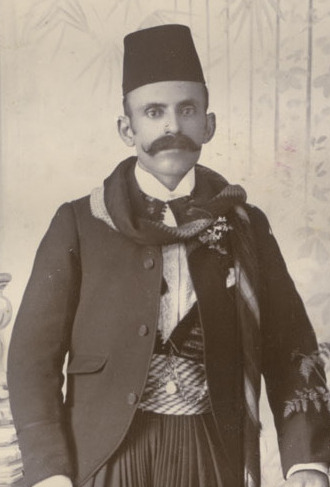
- Born: 25 August 1864; Shweir, Mount Lebanon Mutasarrifate
- Died: 2 December 1941 (aged 77); Auckland, New Zealand
- Occupation: Wine-maker
- Known for: Corbans Wines

Assid Abraham Corban was a New Zealand pedlar, importer, viticulturist and wine-maker. One of the earliest Lebanese settlers in New Zealand, he founded Corbans, now one of New Zealand's oldest and largest wineries.

== Early life and career ==
Assid Abraham Corban was the third child to Orthodox Christians Abraham Hannah Corban, a vigneron, and Helene Hannah Corban. Assid Corban grew up in Shweir, Lebanon which was a predominantly Christian community. In 1890, both of Corban's parents died. This prompted Corban to leave Lebanon to seek a better life.

In 1892, Corban migrated to New Zealand via Egypt and Melbourne, drawn by the opportunities presented by the New Zealand gold rush. Corban learnt English through an Arabic-English phrasebook. Corban established himself as a haberdasher owning a store in Waihi, then Thames. In 1895, he rented a shop on Queen Street in Auckland, which he opened with his cousins, Elias and Job Corban. That same year, Corban became a naturalized British citizen and arranged for his wife and children to join him; they arrived in 1897.

Corban's acquisition of a 10-acre block in Henderson for £320 marked the beginning of Corbans Wines. The land, formerly scrub-covered gumland, was named Mt Lebanon Vineyards, and the business was established under the name A.A. Corban. The first Corban vineyard was experimental, containing varieties like Syrah, Meunier, Cabernet Sauvignon and Black Hamburgh. However, it would be three to four years before the vineyards yielded enough grapes to produce wine in commercial quantities. Thus, the Corbans supplemented their income by selling butter, honey, fruit, vegetables and eggs from their orchards. The viticulturalist, Romeo Bragato, referred to the vineyard as 'the model vineyard of New Zealand, and an object lesson to [winegrowers].'

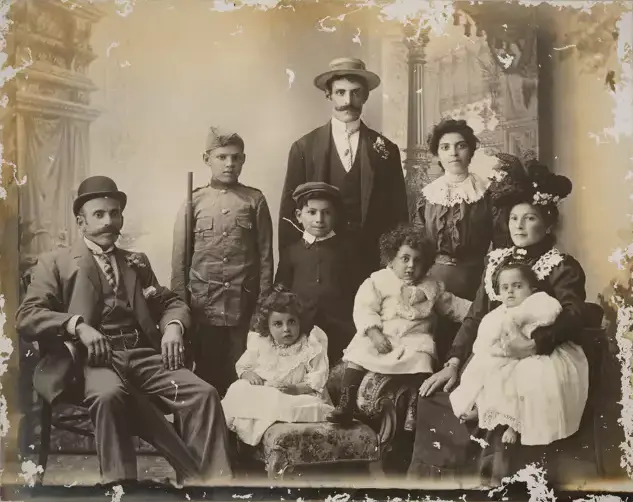
Corban family portrait, 1902

Throughout the 1900s, Assid expanded his vineyards. A three-level wine cellar was added in 1907, and in 1909, Assid bought a 20-acre property where he planted 5-acres of grapes. The temperance movement was an obstacle to Assad's business ventures, with Henderson becoming dry in 1909. To avoid restrictions, Corban opened a depot in wet territory to sell wine. He opened a wine depot in Auckland city, and later built a 17-room homestead on Great North Road. By the end of the 1930s, his winery became known as A. A. Corban and Sons Limited. Corban's wines received numerous accolades. A.A. Corban and Sons won first prize for its unsweetened red wine at the 1910 Henderson show. During the Auckland Exhibition, the company won gold medals for its sherry and port. By the 1930s, Corban's had become one of the largest wineries in New Zealand.

== Personal life and death ==
Assid Corban married Najibie Tanyus Ataia in 1888, a daughter of a well-respected Shwier family. They had ten children.

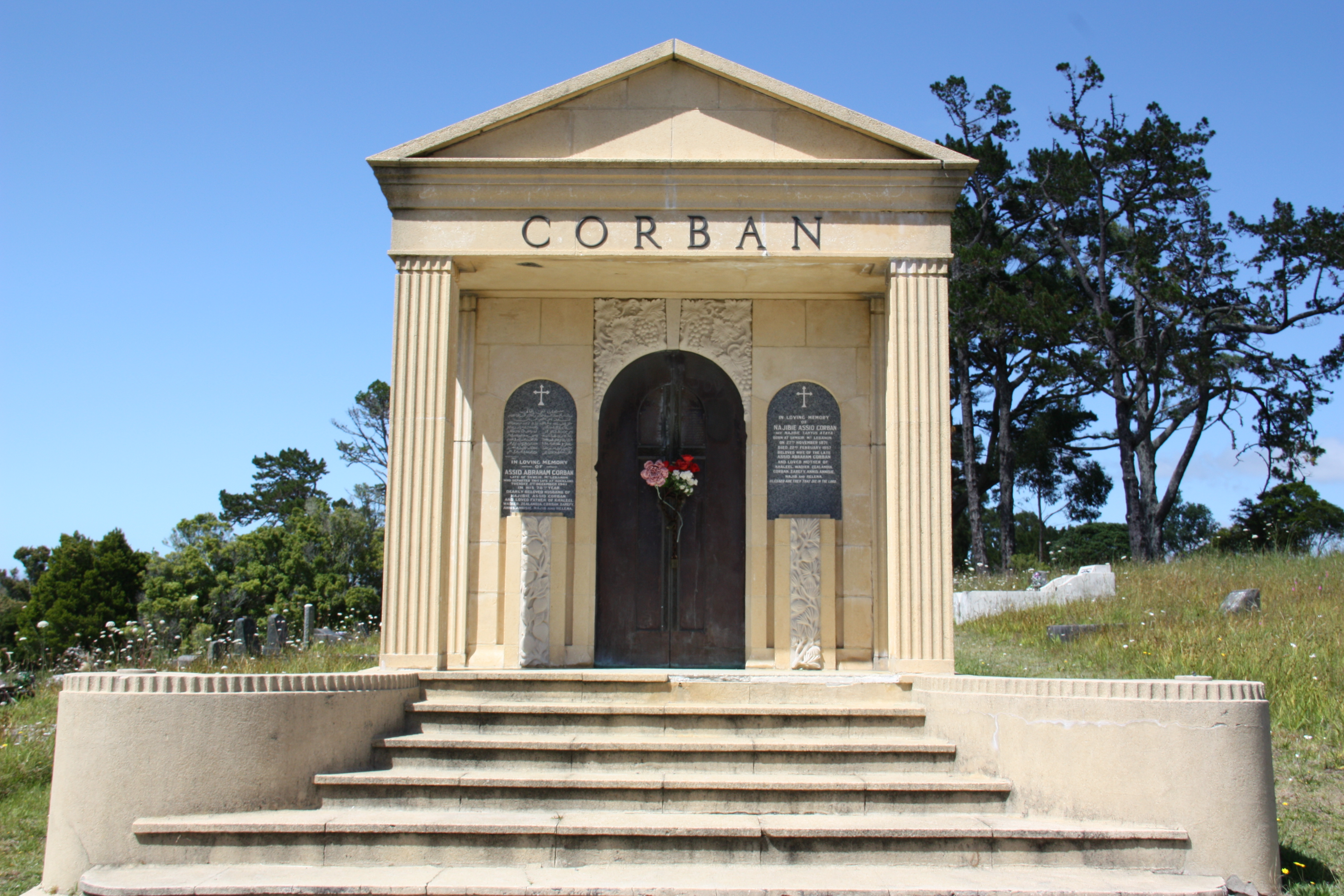
Corban's mausoleum at Waikumete Cemetery

Corban never retired. He died following complications from a stroke, aged 1941, survived by Najibie and their nine of their ten children. His remains were initially held at his homestead, where long lines of mourners streamed past the open casket. He was buried at Waikumete Cemetery in a mausoleum that was built one year after his death, due to labour and materials shortages caused by World War II. His tomb was broken into in the early 1990s. In 1997, Corban was inducted into the New Zealand Business Hall of Fame.

One of Corban's descendants, Assid Khaleel Corban, became a West Auckland local-body politician and rose to become the mayor of Waitakere City.
