= Egyptian New Zealanders =

Total population
- 1,854 (2023)

Regions with significant populations
- Auckland

Languages
- New Zealand English, Egyptian Arabic, Coptic, Nobiin, Sa'idi Arabic

Religion
- Majority: Christianity (Coptic Orthodox), Minorities: Islam (Sunni), Baháʼí, Judaism.

Related ethnic groups
- Egyptians, Egyptian diaspora, Arab New Zealanders, Egyptian Australians, Egyptian Americans, Egyptian Canadians, Egyptian British

Egyptian New Zealanders are New Zealand citizens and New Zealand permanent residents of Egyptian descent. According to the New Zealand 2023 Census, 1,854 New Zealand citizens and permanent residents declared that they were of Egyptian descent.

The majority of Egyptian New Zealanders are Christians, predominantly Coptic Christianity, which is in contrast to the religious affiliation to Islam of the majority of the population of ethnic Egyptians within modern Egypt. Centuries of a steady continuous rate of conversions of the local indigenous Egyptian population has resulted in modern Egypt's Muslim majority, although the indigenous Christian Church of Egypt has retained a sizeable minority throughout its history, up until today. Christians comprise much of the Egyptian diaspora, both in New Zealand and elsewhere.

Some New Zealand citizens and residents declared membership of the Coptic Orthodox Church. Most Egyptian Christians, however, may simply have declared themselves "Christian" without specifying the Coptic denomination, while other Egyptian Christians may belong to various other denominations, either born into or converted.

== Emigration ==
Emigration from Egypt was significant in the late 1940s and 1950s, disproportionately so for non-Muslim religious minorities escaping the growing Arab nationalist movement in Egypt which saw the overthrow of the Egyptian monarchy and the subsequent Suez Crisis.

In total numbers, Egyptian Christians were the largest contingent of emigrants to leave Egypt for other countries, including to New Zealand. Christians were the second largest in terms of proportion to their original community size in Egypt. Egyptian Jews, as a proportion of their original community size in Egypt, were the largest emigrant community to leave Egypt (they were the second largest in total numbers). The number of Jews in Egypt numbered around 75,000 in 1948, and following the establishment of the State of Israel that same year, almost the entire population left in the subsequent years during the Jewish exodus from Arab lands, settling largely in Israel, United States, Europe, Latin America, as well as Australia and New Zealand.

== See also ==
- Egyptian Australians
- Arab New Zealanders
- Coptic Orthodox Church in Australia and New Zealand
- Egypt–New Zealand relations
