= Corbans =

Former New Zealand winery

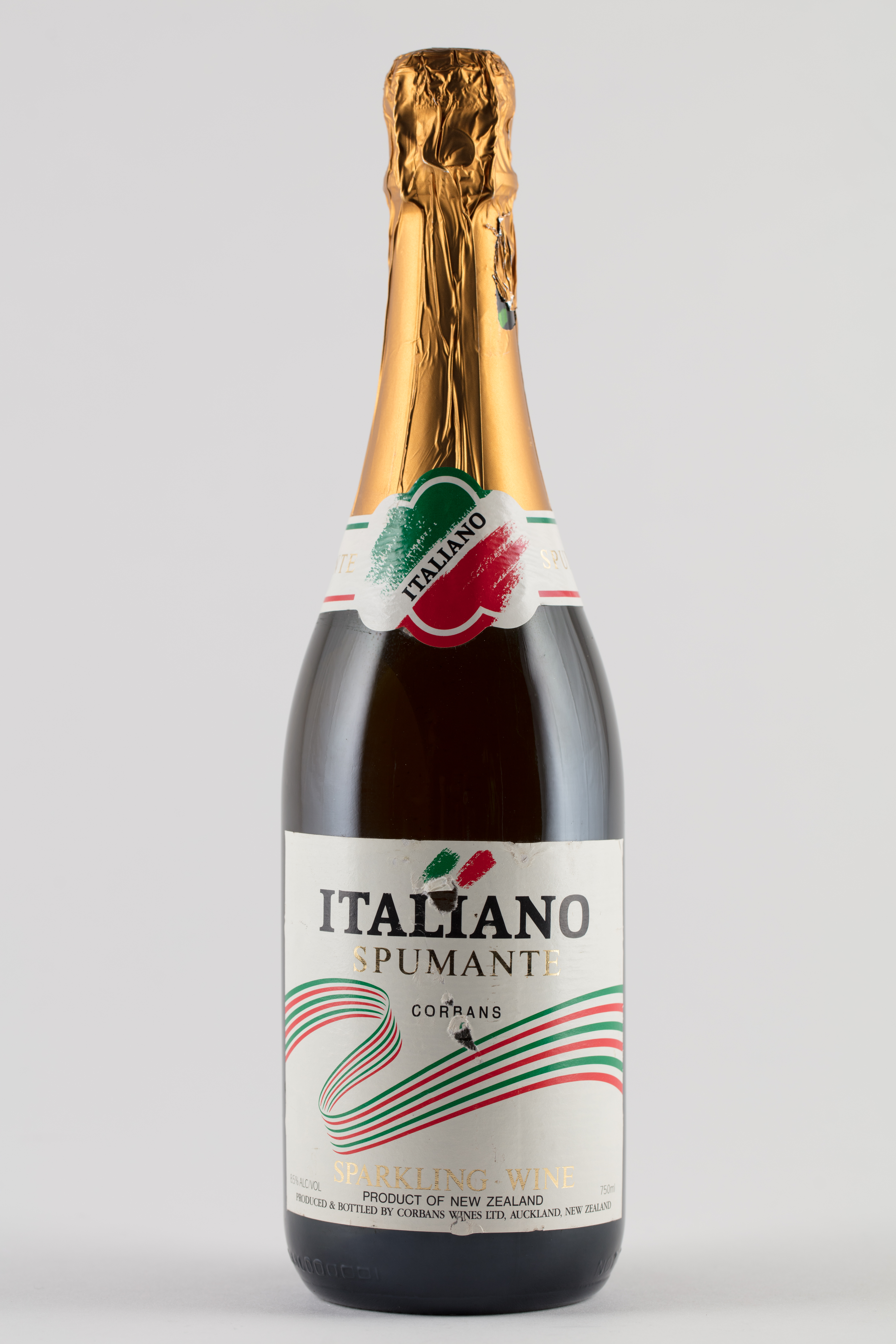
Bottle of Italian-style sparkling wine from Corbans

Corbans Wines was one of New Zealand's oldest wineries, established in 1902 by Assid Abraham Corban, a Lebanese immigrant who had arrived in New Zealand ten years earlier. Corbans Wines grew to become the second largest producer of wine in New Zealand, until they were purchased by their largest competitor Montana Wines in 2000. Following several takeovers of Montana by Allied Domecq and then Pernod Ricard, the Corbans brand was spun off in 2011 and is now owned by Lion.

== History ==
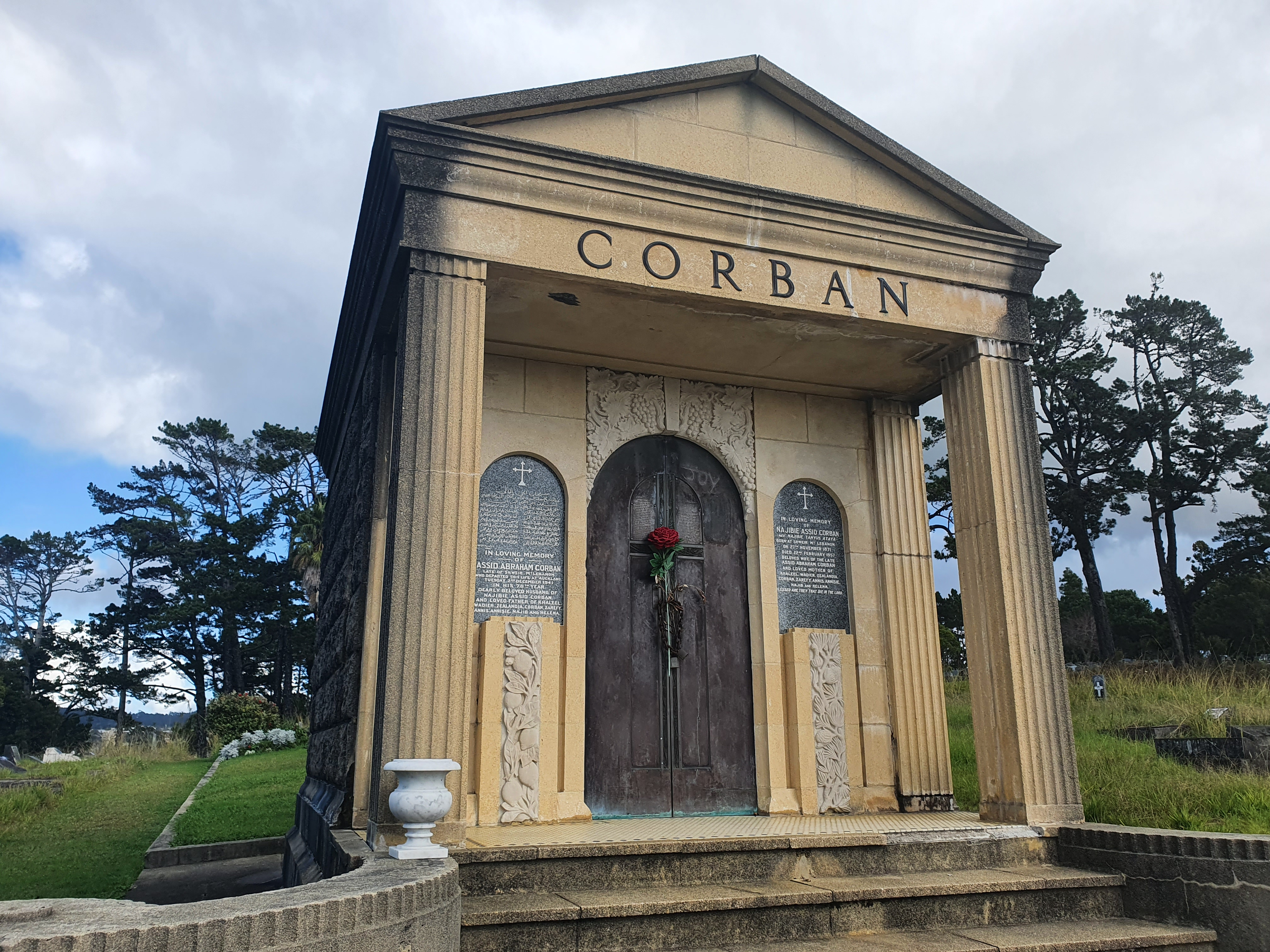
The Corban family mausoleum in Waikumete Cemetery

Assid Abraham Corban purchased a 4-hectare (9.9-acre) block of rural land for £320 in Henderson. Although Henderson is now suburban Auckland, at the time the block was in a rural area quite some distance away, which he named Mt Lebanon Vineyards. The original plantings were Black Hamburgh, Chasselas, Hermitage, and Cabernet Sauvignon.

The first vintage was in 1908, coinciding with the local electorate voting in prohibition, which meant he was unable to sell wine from the property. Assid's son Wadier took over wine-making in 1916, and by the 1920s the Corban family were the largest winemakers in New Zealand. Development of different vineyards by the five sons of Assid Corban continued until 1963 when the partnership of the five brothers was converted into Corban Wines Ltd.

By the 1960s, Corbans produced New Zealand's first commercial Müller-Thurgau, Pinotage, and Chardonnay wines, and were pioneering many new developments in winemaking such as using cultured yeast and temperature-control during fermentation, and the use of stainless steel tanks and press machinery. At the same time however, the family struggled to finance increasing competition with Montana Wines. New Zealand food wholesaler Rothman Industries (later Magnum Corporation) took a shareholding, and by 1979 had taken full control.

In the 1980s Corbans was also producing wines under the Stoneleigh and Robard and Butler labels. Today, the Corban family are no longer associated with Corbans wines; Alwyn Corban set out in 1981 to establish Ngatarawa Wines in what is now the Bridge Pa Triangle zone of the Hawke's Bay wine region, now owned by Mission Estate.

== Corban Estate Arts Centre ==
The original estate homestead and winery buildings in Henderson were sold in 1992 to the Waitakere City Council, which repurposed the historic buildings as artist's studios, galleries, office spaces and a café establishing the Corban Estate Arts Centre (CEAC) in 2001. The address is 2 Mt Lebanon Lane and 426 Great North Road, Henderson, Auckland. Since the Auckland city councils merged, the centre is funded by the Auckland City Council and also the Henderson-Massey Local Board. There is a wide range of programmes, including art classes for adults and children and a schools education programme. One example is the Kākano Youth Arts Collective, set up in 2013 in response to concerns about anti-social behaviour of young people in West Auckland. Arts organisations based at Corbans Estate also include Te Pou Theatre, Red Leap Theatre and Atamira Dance Company.
