= Pasifika New Zealanders =

Ethnic group in New Zealand

Tagata Pasefika-Niu Sila; Fakatangata Pasifiki-Nuʻu Sila
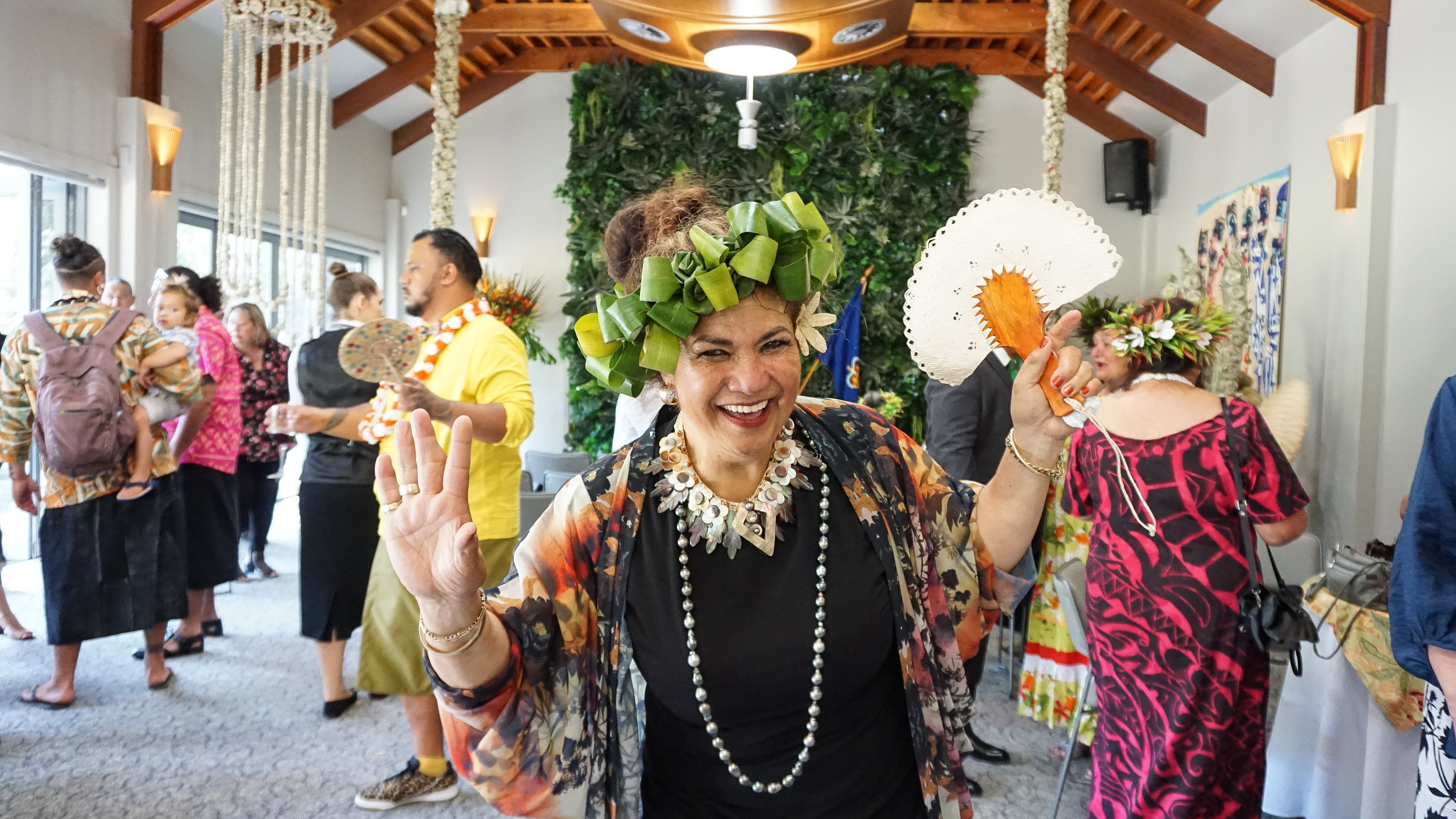
- Mary Ama and the Pacifica Mamas celebrating the Matairangi Mahi Toi arts residency at Government House

Total population
- 442,632 (2023)

Regions with significant populations
- Auckland, Wellington, Hamilton, Christchurch

Languages
- New Zealand English, Samoan, Tongan, Cook Islands Māori, Fijian, Rotuman, Tokelauan, Niuean, Tuvaluan, Tahitian

Related ethnic groups
- Tuvaluan New Zealander, Tongan New Zealanders, Pacific Islander Americans, Solomon Islander New Zealanders, Samoan New Zealanders, Papua New Guinean New Zealanders, Māori people, Māori Australians, Samoan Australians, Tongan Australians, Fijian Australians

Pasifika New Zealanders (also called Pacific Peoples) are a pan-ethnic group of New Zealanders associated with, and descended from, the indigenous peoples of the Pacific Islands (also known as Pacific Islanders) outside New Zealand itself. (Note: Note Pasifika does include indigenous peoples originating from other nations in the Realm of New Zealand, namely Niue, the Cook Islands and Tokelau; see § Ethnic origins.) They form the fourth-largest ethnic grouping in the country, after European New Zealanders, indigenous Māori, and Asian New Zealanders. Over 380,000 people identify as being of Pacific origin, representing 8% of the country's population, with the majority residing in Auckland.

== History ==
Prior to the Second World War, Pasifika in New Zealand numbered only a few hundred. Wide-scale Pasifika migration to New Zealand began in the 1950s and 1960s, typically from countries associated with the Commonwealth and the Realm of New Zealand, including Western Samoa (modern-day Samoa), the Cook Islands and Niue.

In the 1970s, governments (both Labour and National), migration officials, and special police squads targeted Pasifika illegal overstayers. Pacific Studies academic Dr Melani Anae describes the Dawn Raids as "the most blatantly racist attack on Pacific peoples by the New Zealand government in New Zealand's history".

Immigrant Pasifika families settled in the inner city suburbs of Auckland and other major cities in the country, when middle-class Pākehā families were tending to move outwards to newer, more distant suburbs. Pasifika immigrants also tended to replace Urban Māori in central suburbs.

By the mid-1970s, gentrification became an issue for Pasifika communities in Auckland. The cheap housing found in Ponsonby and other inner city Auckland suburbs were attractive to Pākehā young professionals, especially socially liberal families searching for a multicultural and urban lifestyle. As these houses were purchased, the available rental stock plummeted, and Pasifika families who tended to rent more began to relocate to suburbs further out from the city centre. The Pasifika populations in Ponsonby and Freemans Bay peaked in 1976. Grey Lynn continued to have a large Pasifika population (particularly Samoan) until the mid-1980s.

The umbrella term Pasifika, meaning "Pacific" in Polynesian languages, was first used by government agencies in New Zealand in the 1980s to describe all migrants from the Pacific islands and their descendants.

== Demographics ==
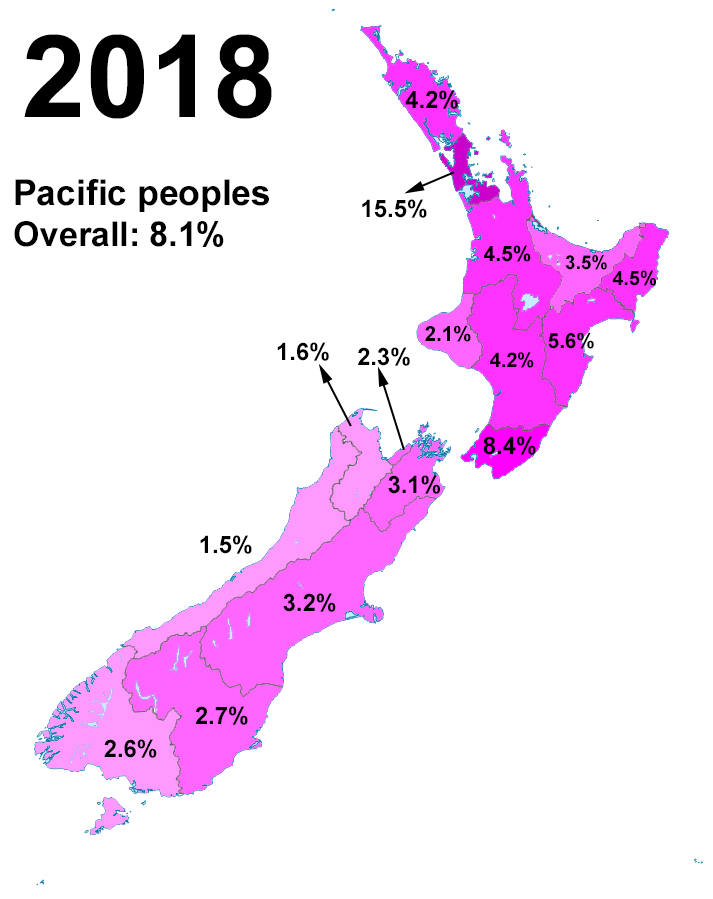
Pacific peoples in 2018

Pacific Islanders New Zealanders population pyramid in 2018

There were 442,632 people identifying as being part of the Pacific Peoples ethnic group at the 2023 New Zealand census, making up 8.9% of New Zealand's population. This is an increase of 60,990 people (16.0%) since the 2018 census, and an increase of 146,691 people (49.6%) since the 2013 census. Some of the increase between the 2013 and 2018 census was due to Statistics New Zealand starting to add ethnicity data from other sources (previous censuses, administrative data, and imputation) to the census data to reduce the number of non-responses.

The median age of Pasifika New Zealanders was 24.9 years, compared to 38.1 years for all New Zealanders; 136,077 people (30.4%) were aged under 15 years, 123,828 (28.0%) were 15 to 29, 156,534 (35.4%) were 30 to 64, and 26,193 (5.9%) were 65 or older.

At the 2018 census, there were 191,391 males and 190,254 females, giving a sex ratio of 1.006 males per female. The majority of Pasifika were born in New Zealand: 66.4% at the 2018 census, up from 62.3% at the 2013 census and 60.0% at the 2006 census.

In terms of population distribution as at the 2023 census, 275,079 (62.1%) Pasifika New Zealanders lived in the Auckland region, 126,678 (28.6%) live in the North Island outside the Auckland region, and 40,845 (9.2%) live in the South Island. The Māngere-Ōtāhuhu local board area of Auckland had a majority Pasifika population at 60.4%, with the next highest concentrations in the nearby Ōtara-Papatoetoe local board area (48.7%) and Manurewa local board area (39.9%). Porirua City had the highest concentration of Pacific people outside Auckland at 26.5%. The lowest concentrations of Pasifika New Zealanders are in northern Canterbury: the Kaikōura district had the lowest concentration at 1.0%, with the neighbouring Hurunui district having the second-lowest concentration at 1.3%.

According to responses to the 2018 census, 91.6% of Pacific Peoples spoke English, and 37.8% spoke two languages.

=== Origins (alone or in any combination) ===
Pacific New Zealanders in the 2023 New Zealand Census
Ancestry	Flag	2023	
Ancestry	Flag	Numbers	%
Samoan		213,069	4.26%
Tongan		97,824	1.96%
Cook Islands Māori		94,176	1.89%
Niuean		34,944	0.70%
Fijian		25,038	0.50%
Tokelauan		9,822	0.20%
Tuvaluan		6,585	0.13%
I-Kiribati		4,659	0.093%
"Pacific Islander" (not further defined)		2,271	0.045%
Tahitian		2,019	0.040%
Rotuman		1,323	0.026%
Papua New Guinean		1,290	0.026%
Indigenous Australian		1,161	0.023%
Ni-Vanuatu		1,161	0.023%
Solomonese		924	0.019%
Native Hawaiian		699	0.014%
Pacific Peoples not elsewhere classified		564	0.011%
New Caledonian		265	0.00008%
Pitcairn Islander		264	0.0053%
Nauruan		120	0.0024%
Total Pacific Peoples population		442,632	100.0%

== In politics ==
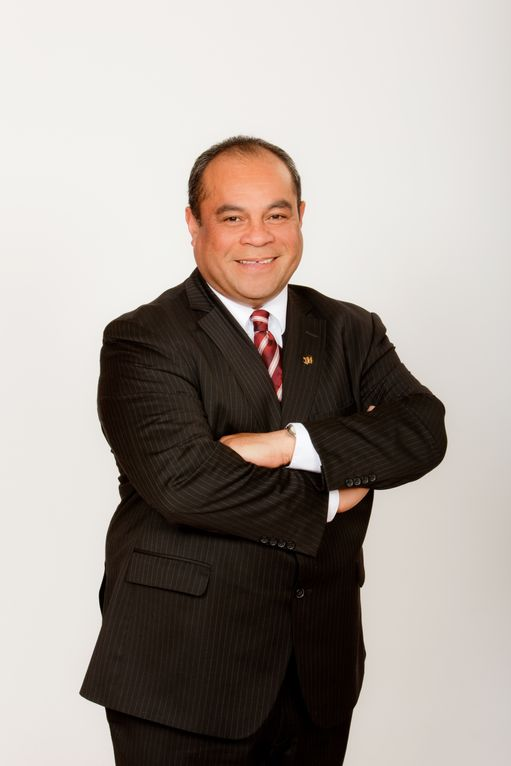
Samoan-born Aupito William Sio currently holds the record for being the longest serving Pasifika MP, serving from 2008 to 2023

In 1993, Samoan-born Taito Phillip Field became the first Pasifika member of parliament (MP), when he won the Otara electorate seat for Labour. Field was joined in 1996 by Samoan politicians Mark Gosche and Arthur Anae (the first Pasifika MP from the National Party), and by Winnie Laban in 1999. In 2008, Field left the Labour Party and formed the New Zealand Pacific Party, a short-lived political party aimed at representing conservative Christian Pasifika communities.

For the 2008 New Zealand general election, Samoan-born Sam Lotu-Iiga was elected as MP for Maungakiekie, and was joined by Labour list MPs William Sio and Carmel Sepuloni, who was the first MP of Tongan heritage. In 2010, Kris Faafoi entered parliament by winning the 2010 Mana by-election, becoming the first MP of Tokelauan descent. In 2011, Alfred Ngaro became the first MP of Cook Island descent by winning the Maungakiekie electorate. Further Pasifika MPs entered parliament in the 2010s: Asenati Taylor for New Zealand First (2011), Christchurch East MP Poto Williams (2013), Manukau East MP Jenny Salesa (2014) and Anahila Kanongata'a-Suisuiki (2017).

The 2020 New Zealand general election saw the largest cohort of Pasifika MPs entering parliament: Terisa Ngobi, Barbara Edmonds, Tangi Utikere, Neru Leavasa for the Labour Party, and the first Pasifika MP from the Green Party, Teanau Tuiono. 2023 saw Efeso Collins, formerly a member of the Auckland Council, joining as a member of the Green Party.

Tala Cleverley was the first Pasifika local body politician elected in Aotearoa. She was elected to the Wellington City Council in 1979 and held her role as a Labour Party city councillor until 1995.

The Auckland Council has had three Pasifika councillors since its founding in 2010: Alf Filipaina and former National MP Arthur Anae representing the Manukau ward since 2010, and Efeso Collins in 2016, replacing Anae's for the Manukau ward. In 2022, Collins unsuccessfully ran for the 2022 Auckland mayoral election. Collins entered parliament in 2023 as a member of the Green Party of Aotearoa New Zealand, serving until his death in February 2024.

When elected to the Dunedin City Council in October 2016, Marie Laufiso became Dunedin’s first Pasifika city councillor and the Green Party's first successful Pasifika election candidate at either local or central government level; Laufiso is of Sāmoan and Tongan descent.

In 2025, Fauono Ken Laban became New Zealand's first Pasifika mayor when he was elected as mayor of Lower Hutt.

== Gallery ==
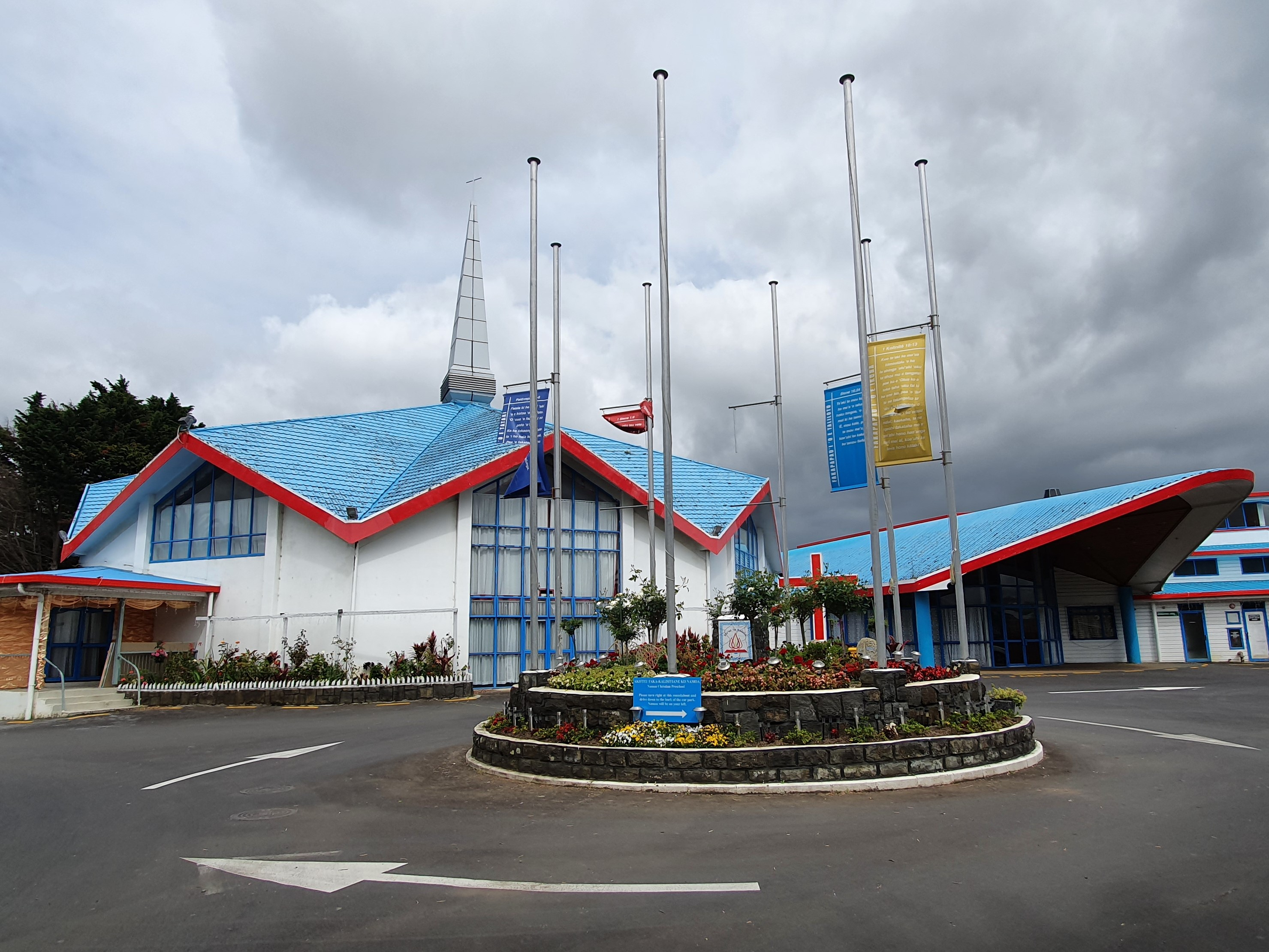
Tokaikolo Tongan Church in Māngere Bridge

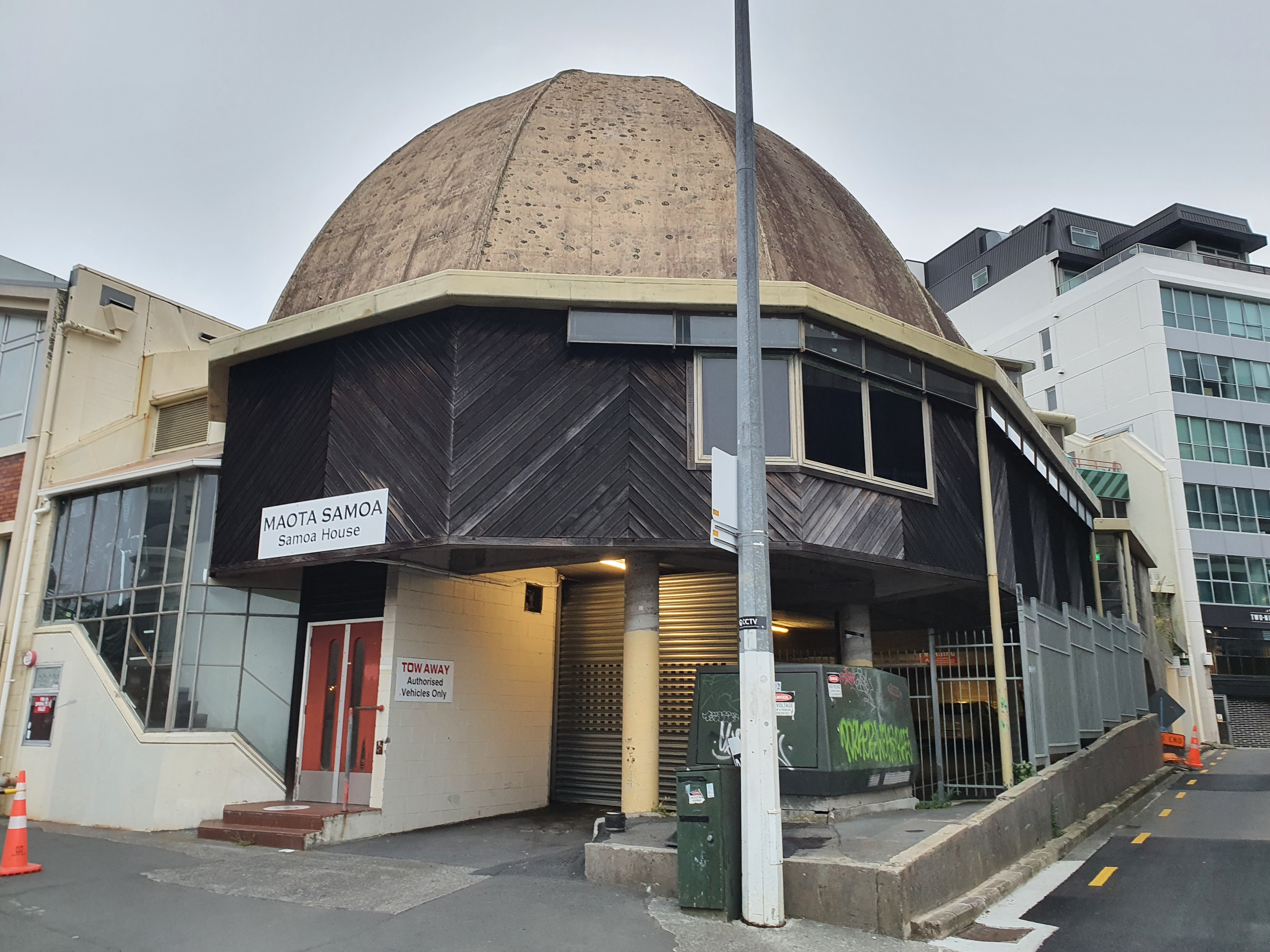
Maota Samoa / Samoa House, former consulate and current library and event space on Karangahape Road, Auckland

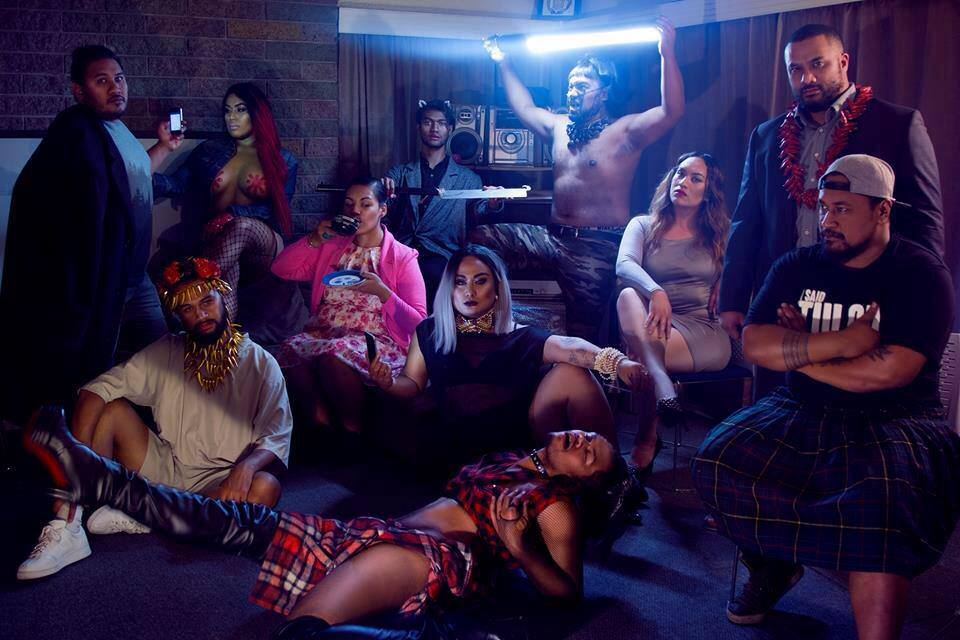
FAFSWAG, a Māori and Pasifika queer arts collective

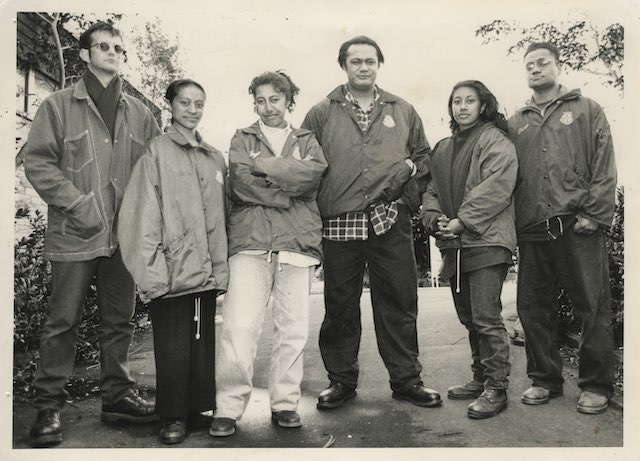
Member of the Pacific Underground performing arts collective (1994)

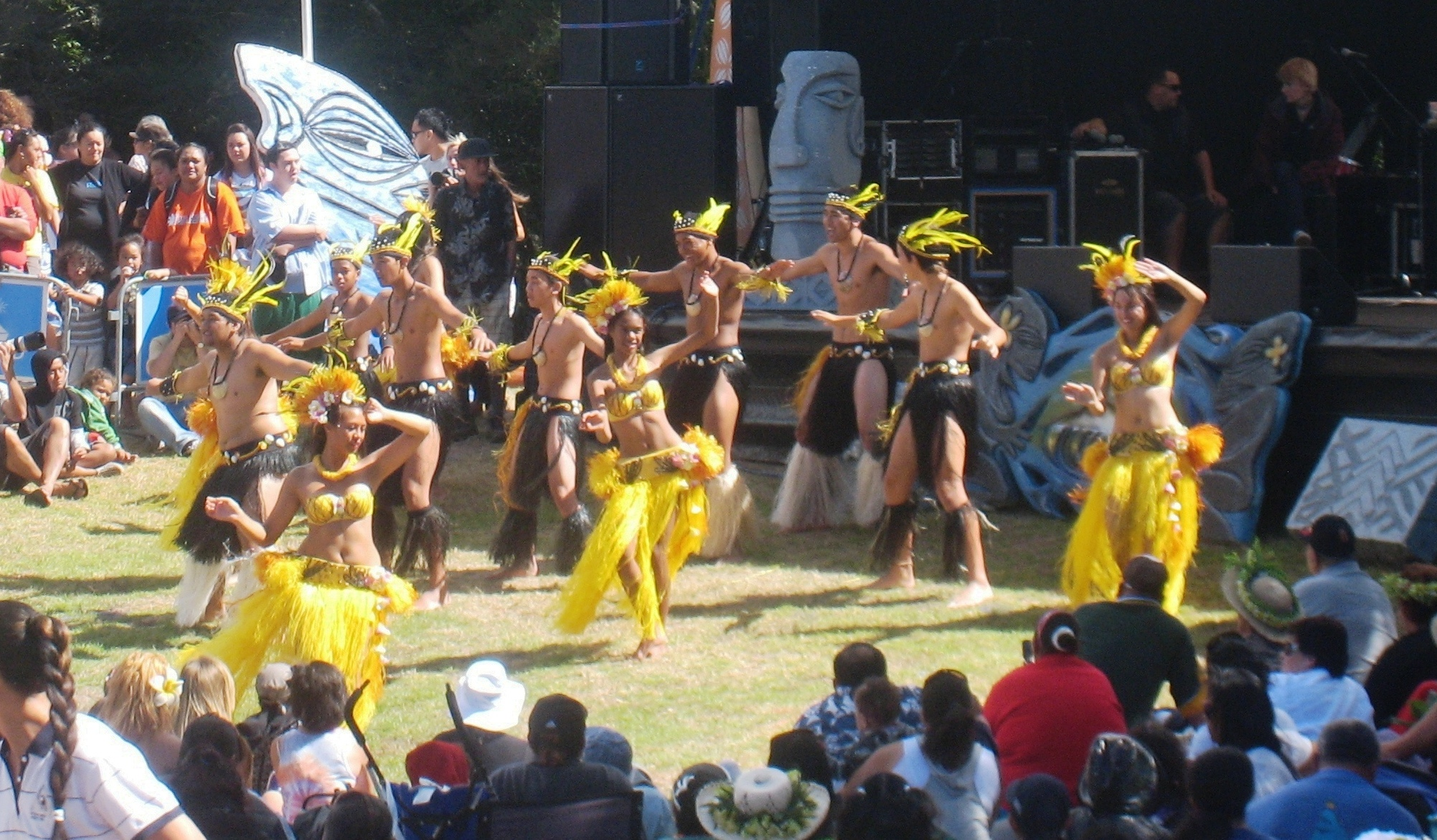
Dancers at the Cook Islands stage at the Pasifika Festival in Auckland (2010)

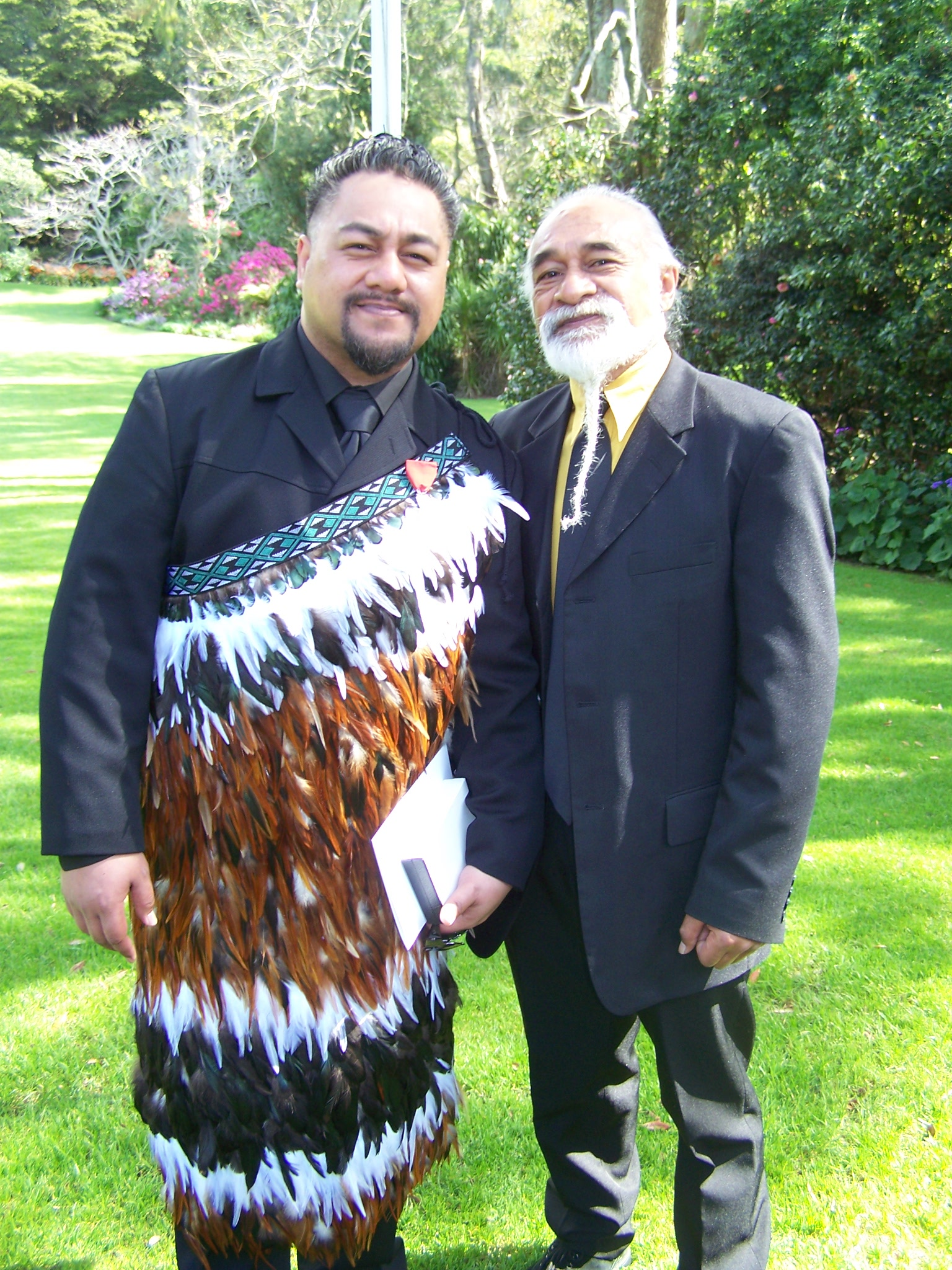
Hip-hop musician Che Fu won the Single of the Year and Best Male Vocalist awards at the 1997 Aotearoa Music Awards, for the single "Chains".

== See also ==
- Urban Pasifika, hip hop music
- Pasifika Festival
- List of ethnic origins of New Zealanders
- Culture of New Zealand
