= Pasifika Festival =

Annual Pacific Islands-themed festival in Auckland, New Zealand

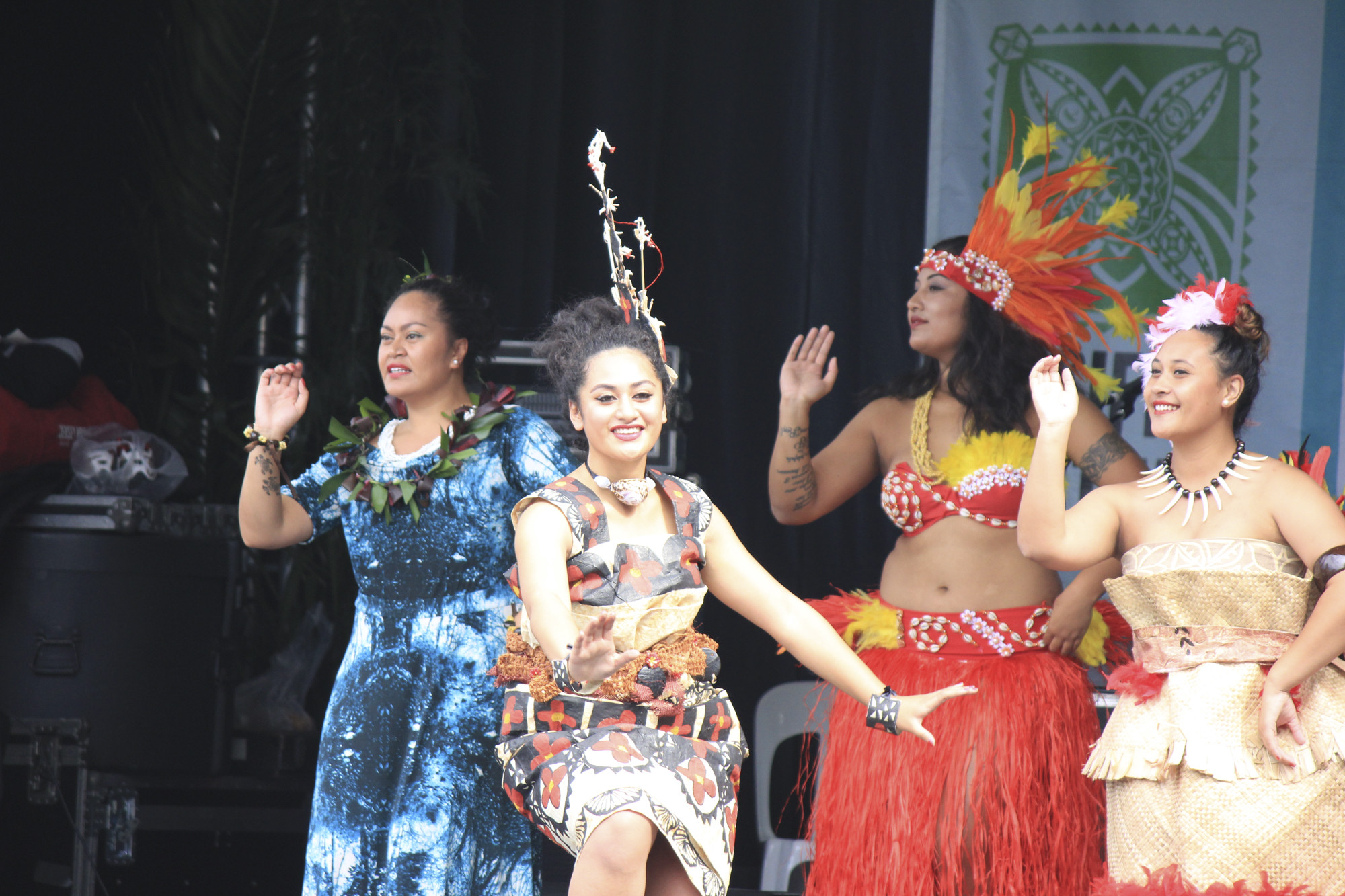
- Cook Islands dancers at the Pasifika Festival
- Genre: Pasifika arts and culture
- Frequency: annual
- Location: Auckland
- Country: New Zealand
- Established: 1993
- Attendance: 200,000
- Major events: traditional cuisine and performances from Samoa, Tonga, Cook Islands, Fiji, Niue, Tahiti, Tokelau, Tuvalu, Kiribati, Hawai'i and Māori
- Organiser: Tātaki Auckland Unlimited
- Website: https://www.aucklandnz.com/pasifika

The Pasifika Festival is a festival celebrating Pasifika New Zealanders and their pan-cultural identity, held annually in Western Springs Reserve, Auckland. Celebrated since 1993, it is the largest festival of its type in the world and attracts over 200,000 visitors every year.

The event is owned and hosted by Auckland Council.

The festival presents a wide variety of cultural experiences, including traditional cuisine and performances from Samoa, Tonga, Cook Islands, Fiji, Niue, Tahiti, Tokelau, Tuvalu, Kiribati and the Tangata Whenua (New Zealand Māori).

== History ==
=== Beginnings ===
The original driving force behind the festival was a secretary of the South Pacific Forum, Roy Vaughan. His idea to create an event to celebrate the cultures of the South Pacific came to realisation in February 1991 when he showed his proposal to several high-ranking officials of South Pacific nations: Cook Islands Consul General Bill Te Ariki, Papua New Guinea Consul General Alister Martin and others. Initially the festival was supposed to take place in Central Auckland. The newly formed South Pacific Island Nation Development Agency accumulated feedback from the community and changed the location to Western Springs a week and a half before the event; Western Springs was supported by the mayor, Les Mills, and the City Council.

The first Pasifika Festival was held 6–12 March 1993; its community day was visited by 30,000 people. The scope of the festival broadened at the very first event as several Micronesian and Melanesian groups chose to participate. Despite some initial scepticism and remarks on lack of representation in an evaluation report delivered by Nancy Sheehan, overall it was successful. The festival was awarded the Creative New Zealand Creative Places Award next year.

Annual events were held for the first four years without significant change. In 1997, after a reorganisation, Auckland City Council encapsulated the Pasifika committee and the support from the South Pacific Island Nation Development Agency became redundant. After that, the new event coordinator Pitsch Leiser worked towards making the festival sustainable during the two years he was involved with it. From that time onwards visitor numbers started to grow rapidly.

=== The mid-years ===
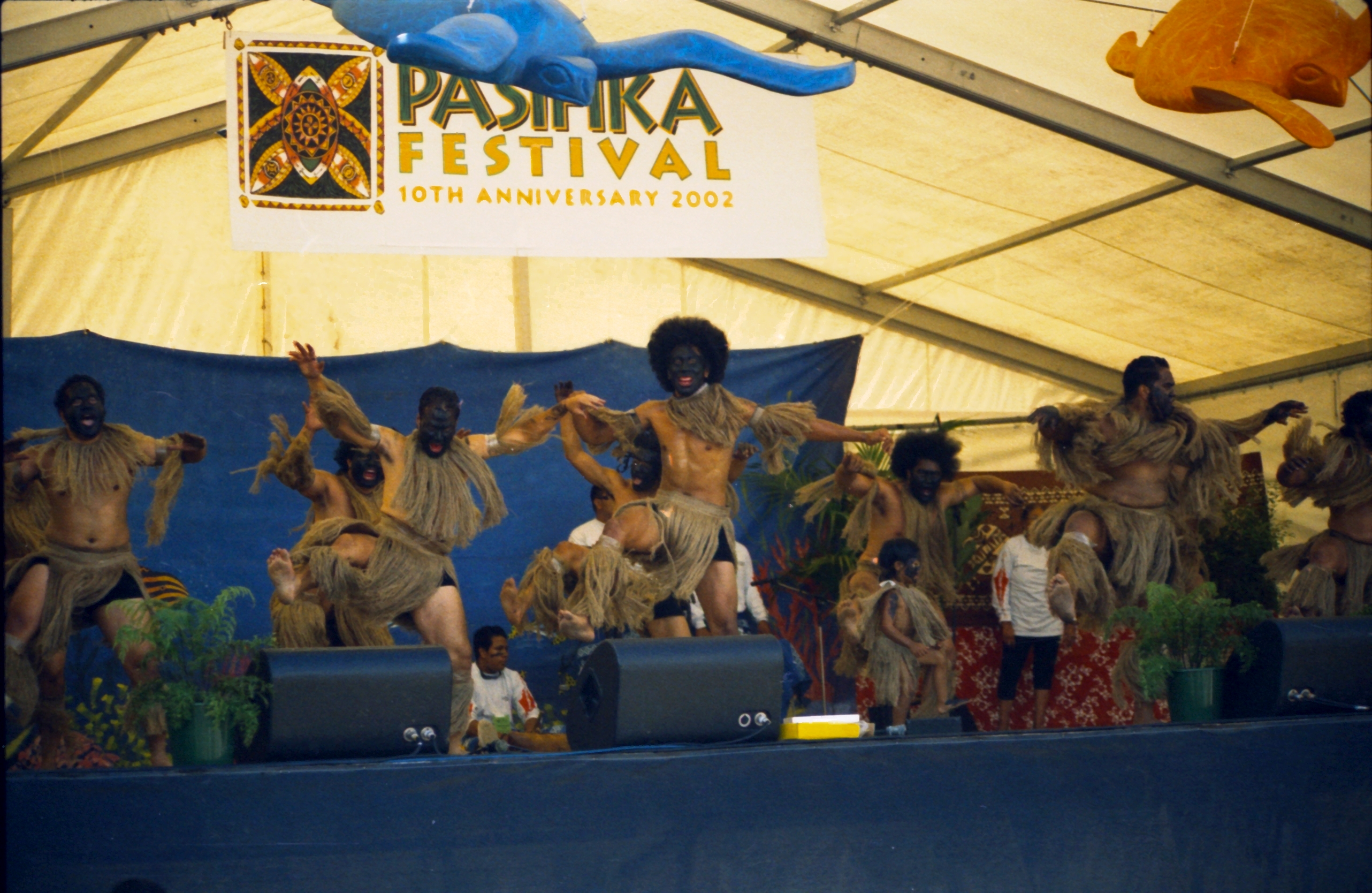
Niuean dancers at the Pasifika Festival (2002).

The Pasifika 1999 was the first Pasifika festival with a large company sponsorship. Although the involvement of KFC as the main sponsor was deemed highly controversial, it helped to increase the budget and attracted other major sponsors to the consequential events. The other important development of that year was the concept of 'national villages' that were presenting culturally appropriate items and performances.

After the event Leiser stepped down from the coordinator role. The new coordinator, Michelle Khan, re-established communication with the communities, raised the stallholder's fees and worked on improving and increasing the role of villages that were mainly just market stalls while the performances mainly occurred at the main stages. The organisers started to express their concerns to the performing groups if they felt that the performance quality was lacking, advising them to gain more experience at smaller local festivals.

The Pasifika Festival 2000 was attended by close to 100,000 people. The 2001 festival was awarded with the Creative New Zealand Creative Places Award.

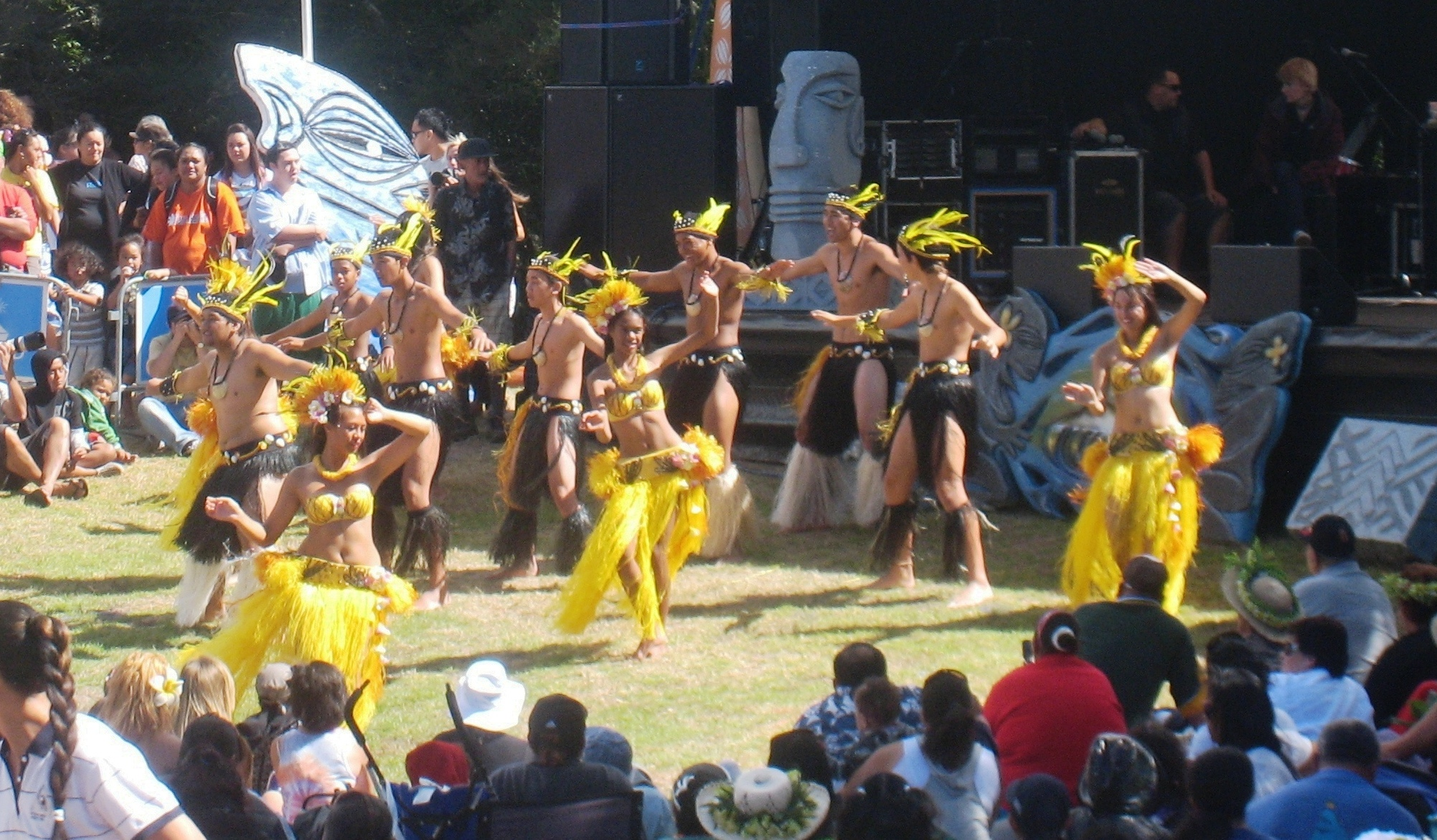
Dancers at the Cook Islands stage, 2010

The 2002 festival was jointly organised by Mere Lomaloma Elliot and a non-Pacific event manager, but it was deemed unsuccessful due to the lack of mutual understanding between them. Elliot was appointed the festival's director in 2003 and held that position until 2006. The position of the full-time festival administration was vacated in 2004 and filled by Rebecca Knox, who in 2006 initiated splitting of the director position into 2: the operations manager (Knox) and the strategic/relationships festival director (Ole Maiava, an artist and an event manager who was earlier involved in the Tu Fa'atasi festival and the Creekfest).

=== 2010s onwards ===
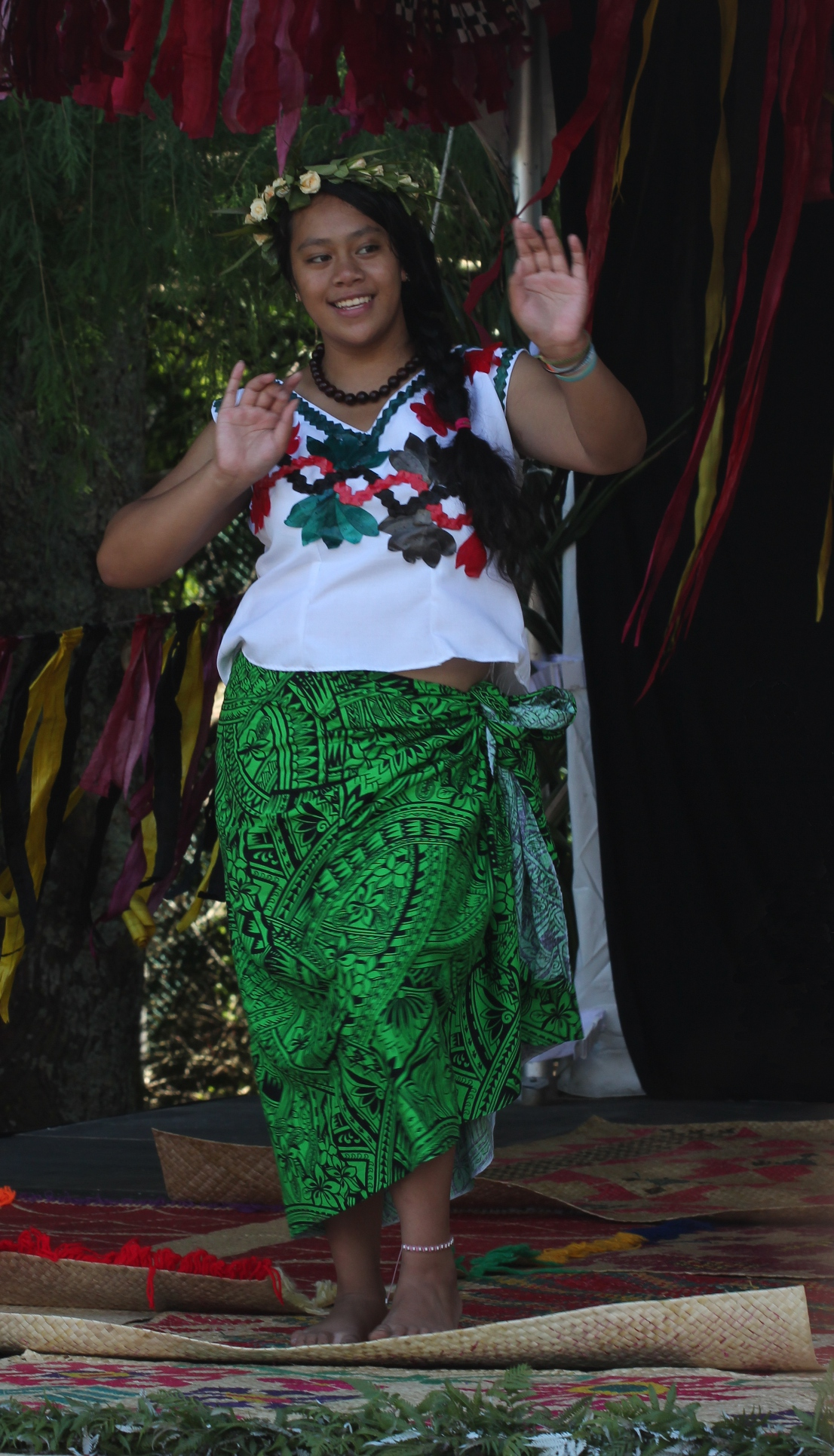
Tuvaluan New Zealand dancer on the Tuvalu stage, 2011 Pasifika festival

Maiava reworked the compensations model for the participants. The auditioning process was streamlined by Tanya Muagututi’a who also established a workshop for emerging artists. Around that time the preparations started taking the whole year, and many staff members do it as a full-time job. After the 2010 festival Pasifika was moved under the Auckland Tourism Events and Economic Development jurisdiction.

The question of Māori exclusion bothered many people, but the organisers could not immediately find a solution that would be appropriate for all parties involved.

The 2012 festival was only two days long, and its length is limited to 2 to 3 days as of 2019.

The 11th Hawaiian village was added in 2015.

In 2015, the festival was moved temporarily to Hayman Park in Manukau after the discovery of Queensland fruit flies in the Grey Lynn area near Western Springs.

In 2016, it moved back to Western Springs.

In 2019, the festival was cancelled for safety reasons on account of the Christchurch mosque shootings.

In 2020, the festival was again cancelled, because of the Coronavirus Pandemic. It was held in 2021 at Mount Smart Stadium.

== Notable people ==
- Joana Monolagi - Fijian village coordinator (2000 - current).

== See also ==
- Pasifika New Zealanders
