= Corban Estate Arts Centre =

Arts precinct in West Auckland, New Zealand

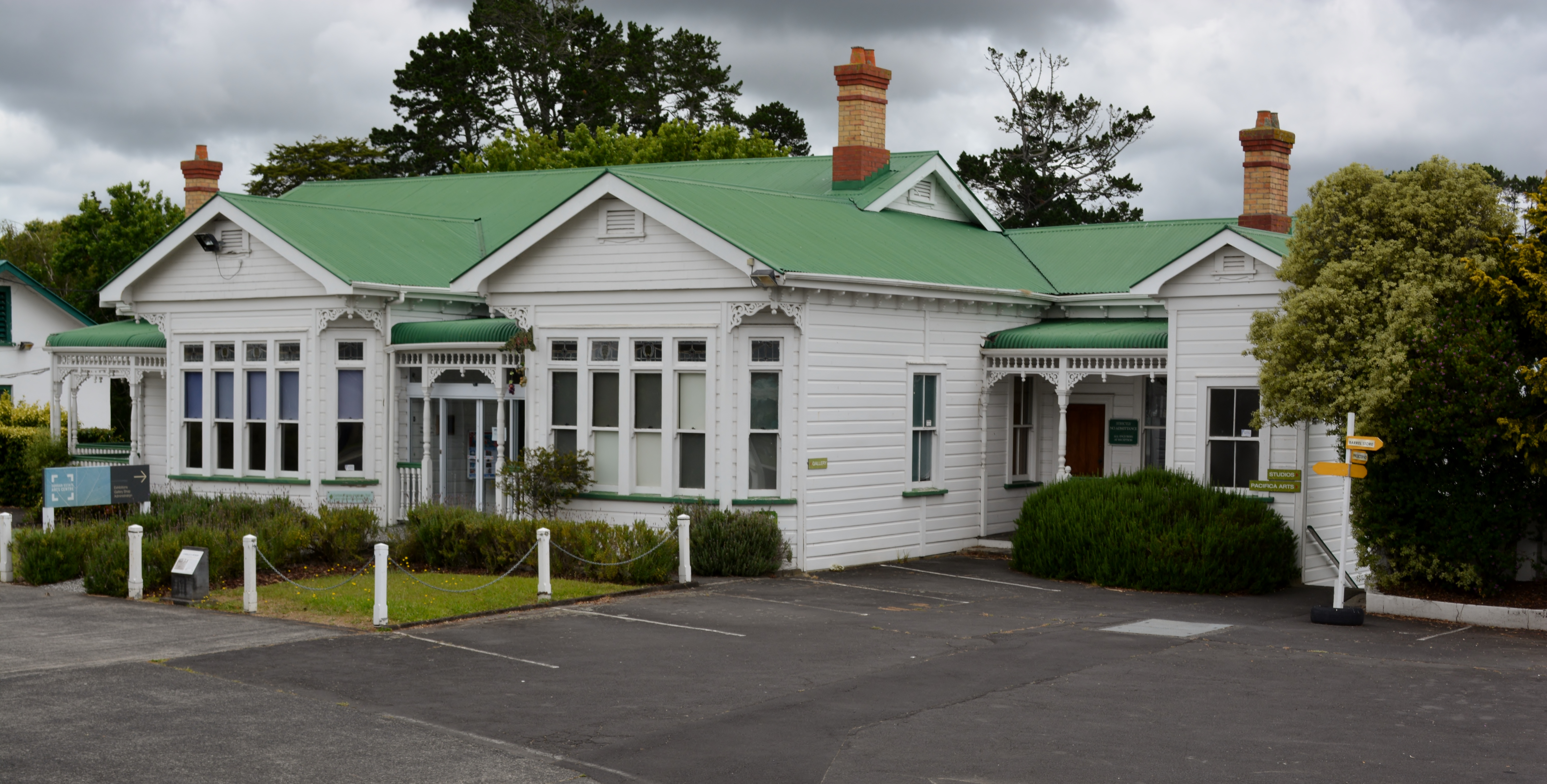
- The Corban Homestead
- Interactive map of Corban Estate Arts Centre
- Address: 2 Mount Lebanon Lane, Henderson, Auckland 0612
- Coordinates: 36.8768°S 174.6277°E

Construction
- Built: 1903
- Opened: 2002

Heritage New Zealand – Category 1
- Designated: 7-July-2022
- Reference no.: 9336

Corban Estate Arts Centre is an arts precinct in West Auckland, New Zealand. Established in 2002 at the site of the Mt Lebanon Vineyard and Winery, the arts centre provides creative production, theatre and gallery space to New Zealand artists.

== Facility ==
The Mt Lebanon Vineyard and Winery was established in 1902 by Assid Abraham Corban. The winery and cellar on the estate were built between 1903 and 1907, and the Corban Homestead, an Edwardian home, was constructed in 1923. The selling depot at the entrance of the site was constructed in 1913, during alcohol prohibition in New Zealand, as an area just outside of the Eden Electorate where alcohol could be purchased. The property was the headquarters for Corban Wines until 1977, when the company sold its interests.

In 1992, the Waitakere City Council purchased the site, subdividing three hectares and establishing the Corban Estate Arts Centre in 2002 on the remaining 6.7 hectare site.

St Michael's Church, a historic Henderson church built in 1914 on the opposite site of Great North Road, was relocated to the arts centre in 2008, and is now a hirable venue.

In July 2022, the Corban Winery and Mt Lebanon Vineyards were entered into the Heritage New Zealand list of category 1 historic places.

== Resident artists, companies and regular events ==
- Atamira Dance Company, a Māori contemporary dance company.
- InterACT Disability Arts Festival
- Kākano Youth Arts Collective, who showcase art produced at the centre at the Kākano Art Gallery in Henderson.
- Pacifica Mamas, based at the Pacifica Arts Centre.
- Mind Over Matter, a charitable organisation focusing on building skills for neurodivergent teenagers through theatre.
- Red Leap Theatre, a theatre troupe who were established in 2010.
- Te Pou Theatre, a centre for Māori theatre, opened on 11 April 2015 in New Lynn, before relocating to Corban Estate in July 2018.
- Uhi Tapu, a tā moko studio run by Mokonuiarangi Smith
- Winter Best, a winter music festival first held in 2022.

=== Former artists, companies and festivals ===
- The Pacifica Living Arts Festival was a festival held annually at Corban Estate in November. The festival was held annually between 1995 and 2014.
- The Waitemata Theatre were long-term residents at the arts centre, performing at the Cellar Theatre. In 2013, the company left the venue, merging with Titirangi Theatre.
