= Kākano Youth Arts Collective =

New Zealand youth art programme

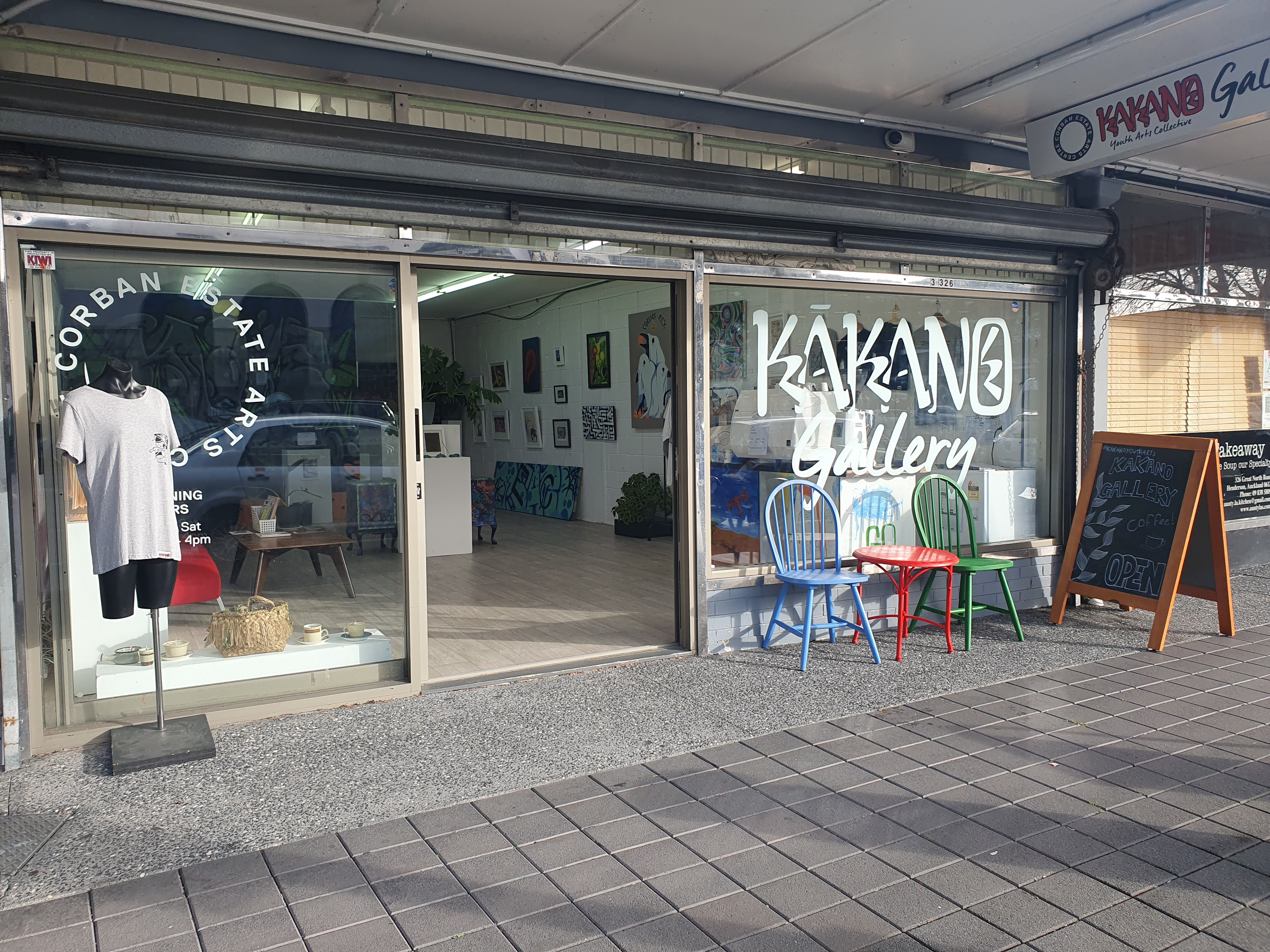

Kākano Youth Arts Collective is a collaborative art group and mentored programme for vulnerable youth in West Auckland, New Zealand. The collective has been based at Corban Estate Arts Centre since 2013 and provides artistic opportunities for participants to improve self-worth and create a safe environment of belonging.

== History ==
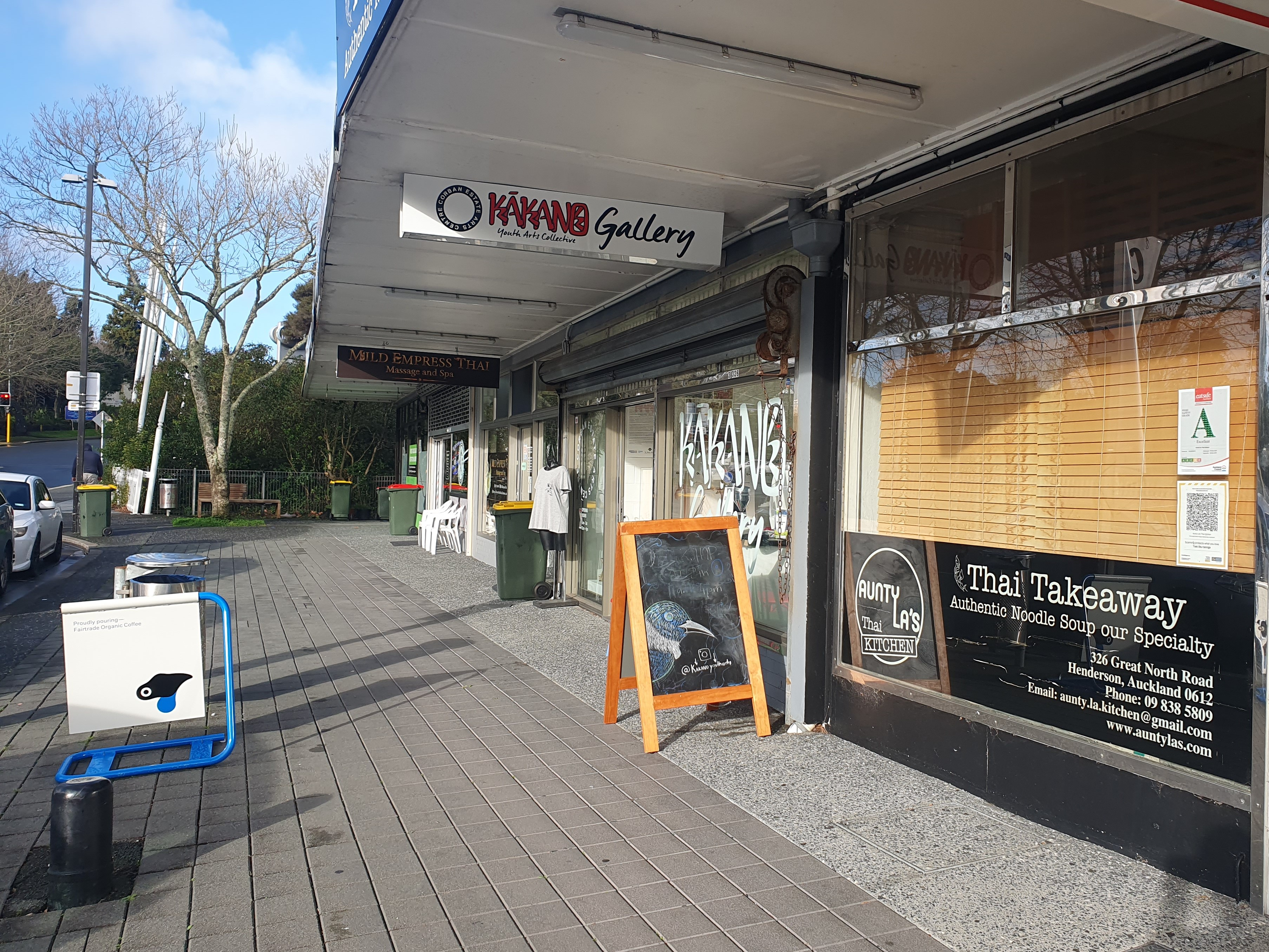
Kākano Art Gallery, Henderson, 2023

The name of the collective originates from the Māori term for 'seed', kākano, as well as 'growth', he kākano. This definition refers to the group's overall aim of inclusivity and development of potential. Alongside Glass Ceiling Arts Collective, Ngā Rangatahi Toa, and Crescendo, Kākano Youth Arts Collective has created and continues to a provide a safe creatively engaging environment for vulnerable rangatahi. The Corban Estate Arts Centre education manager, Mandy Patmore, actioned this response in 2013, later being joined by resident artist Jermaine Reihana in 2015. As of 2025, the programme has hosted 80 young artists total, with around 18 people aged between 12 and 21 participating in their three regular studio sessions per week and external opportunities such as murals and running local workshops.

A more recent development for the collective was their April 2022 opening of Kākano Art Gallery located on Great North Road, Henderson. The publicly accessible gallery supports their artists with annual showings of work and by giving the artists 80% of the profits made from the gallery. A variety of displayable and wearable art items made by the collective's artists are available to view and purchase. Additionally experimental studio sessions are offered to young artists who want to try other artistic mediums. The gallery was assisted in its opening by the Henderson-Massey local board, Eke Panuku Development Auckland, and Te Puni Kōkiri and their Rangatahi Manawaroa fund. Larger companies and institutions like Google, KiwiRail, and Auckland Transport have also been clients of the collective.

== Selected projects ==
To celebrate 10 years of the collective artists Georgia, Lani, TJ, and Eveyz presented a group exhibition at the gallery on Wednesday 20th December 2023. Their works centred around themes of resilience and embracing identity.

A Matariki event was also held between 28 June and 1 July 2021 in partnership with Auckland Live to create an active studio space at the See.Do.Auckland pop-up in Britomart train station. Reihana led the set-up and function of the event and it was free to see up until mid July that year.

The programme collaborated with coffee business Zephyr Coffee and created coffee bag designs. The bags were sold in store alongside limited edition items for 18 months beginning in 2024. Georgia Sykes, 19 years old at the time, was interviewed about her native Kōtare bird design. The company described the choice of bird representing the meaning of Zephyr, "a gentle breeze, capturing a sense of freedom, courage, and adventure."

=== Henderson youth art project ===
The first of the native bird murals located around Henderson was a pihupihu (waxeye) at Henderson Railway Station. This project was interrupted by theft of $700 worth of spray paint from Corban Estate Art Centre, which resulted in a fundraiser on the collective's Facebook page. Beginning in 2015, 23 other murals were completed as part of the Henderson Youth Project (HYAP) in collaboration with Auckland Council and Unitec in response to the council's Graffiti Prevention Plan in central Henderson.

A 2016 report by Dr Bronwen Gray on the project found that initiatives like these were more financially viable for prevention of city damage and promotion of the education system, however despite this a lack of funding for them was reported. Whilst levels of graffiti ranged during the period of research, there was a 59% decrease in graffiti in Henderson Town centre area.

Exhibitions and Projects
Project/Exhibition Title	Artists	Location	Dates
Kākano Art Exhibition	Kākano Youth Arts Collective (2017 cohort, including Nathan Cole in interview)	Corban Estate Arts Centre	13 – 16 December 2017
The Falls Restaurant Gallery Pop-up	Kākano Youth Arts Collective	The Falls Restaurant Car Park, Henderson	3 November 2018 – February 2019
Mōrehu	Kākano Youth Arts Collective (2018 cohort)	Corban Estate Arts Centre	13 -16 December 2018
Te Whakatipu Akoranga	Kākano Youth Arts Collective (2019 cohort)	Corban Estate Arts Centre	12 – 15 December 2019
On The Brighter Side	Kākano Youth Arts Collective (2020 cohort)	Corban Estate Arts Centre	9 – 13 December 2020
FRANKiE 4	Sarah Kaulima (Kākano student), Sam Bailey (Ngāti Porou Ki Harataunga, Ngāti Huarere), and Ahsin Ahsin	Aotea Square	25 August 2021
We Have Something To Say	Georgia, Lani, TJ and Eveyz	Kākano Gallery	20–23 December 2023 16 January – 17 February 2024
Zephyr Coffee x Kākano Youth Art Collective	Georgia Sykes and others	Zephyr Coffee	2024
Whetūrangitia	Students of Kākano Youth Arts Collective, Kelston Boys' High School, and Liston College: Rory Carlyle, Marshall Hepana, Ty Howson, Sarah Kaulima, Tory Whiting	Corban Estate Arts Centre	14 June – 2 August 2025

== Recognition and further opportunities ==
The collective were formally recognised for their work with West Auckland youth by the Henderson-Massey Local Board in 2018, particularly for providing alternative educational opportunities and the progress made with 'the Henderson Youth [mural] Project' alongside Unitec and Auckland Council.

Another opportunity the collective was offered in March 2023 was welcoming famous rapper Snoop Dogg to Aotearoa on the New Zealand leg of his tour. The artist returned to New Zealand after his postponed November 2022 dates, and performed at Christchurch's Orangetheory Stadium, as well as Auckland's Trusts Outdoors. He was welcomed with a kapa haka performance and hongi before meeting with members of the Kākano Youth Arts Collective who gifted him some of their artworks. The artist's response expressed his gratitude for his warm invitation to Aotearoa as quoted: "It's the second time I've been to this place, they greet me with a spiritual ritual and you can feel it." Isiah Noble was one of the Kākano artists who attended. The music artist gifted 16 of the Kākano members tickets to his Auckland show.

=== Career development ===
The collective provides a collaborative space for young artists to create, and notably there is no time frame on how long students can stay in the programme. The programme works with Oranga Tamariki, NZ Police, youth alternative education providers, councils, and boards to make it a pathway for artistic careers. Reihana states that some go on to the Unitec School of Art and Design to get Foundational, Certificate, or Bachelor degrees in their choice of field. Others pathways have been Ama Training Group's animation programme and areas in the film industry.
