= Tuvaluan New Zealanders =

Tuvaluan people living in New Zealand

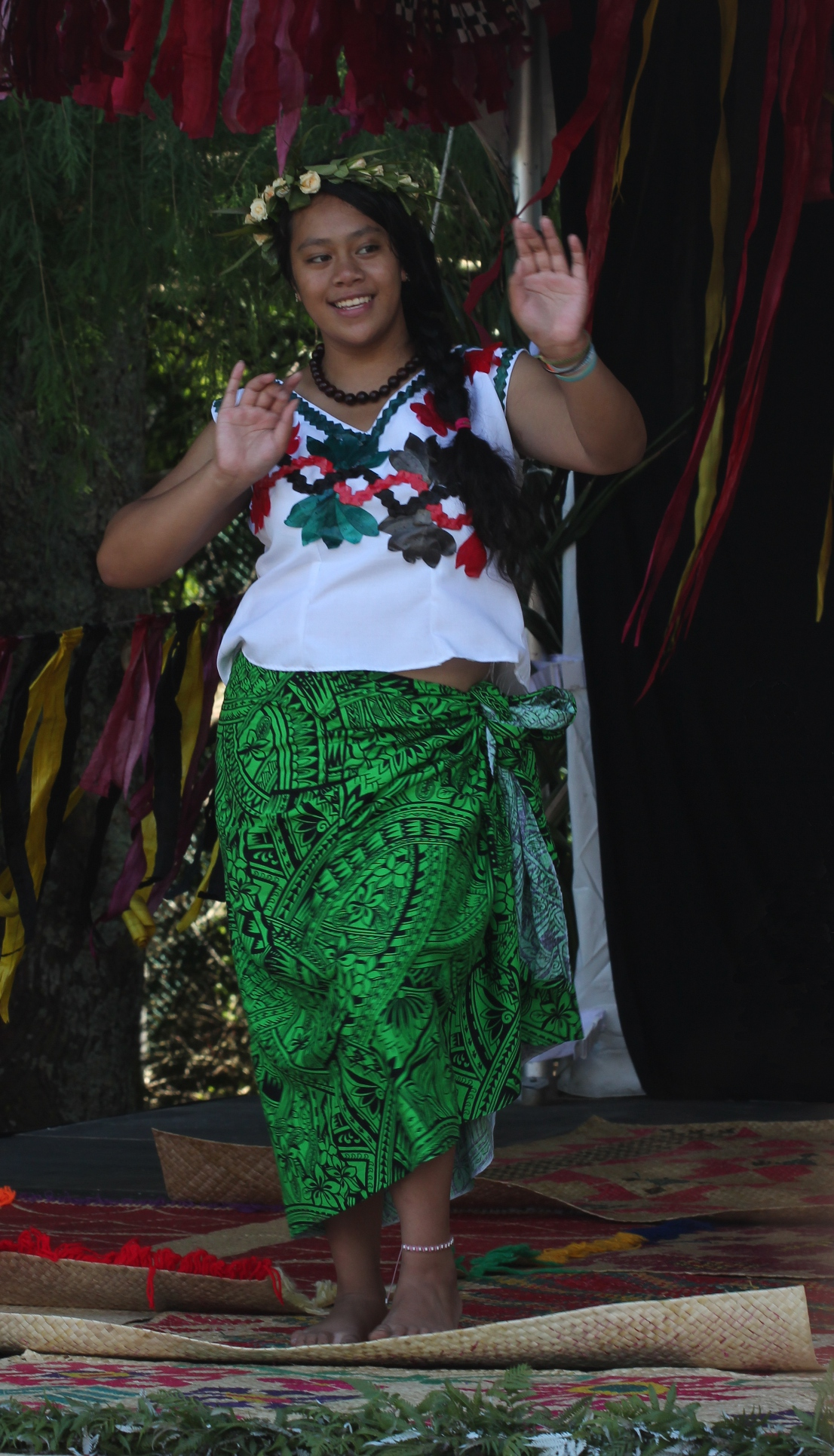
- A Tuvaluan dancer at Auckland's Pasifika Festival

Total population
- 6,585 (2023 census)

Regions with significant populations
- Auckland

Languages
- Tuvaluan, English

The Tuvaluan New Zealand community consists of 6,585 Tuvaluans living in New Zealand. About 46% were born overseas and nearly 80% of them live in Auckland.

== History ==
Due to global warming, Tuvalu's land is under threat from rising sea levels. In response to this risk, in 2002, the Tuvaluan government made an agreement with New Zealand which would allow the migration of all 11,000 Tuvaluans into New Zealand. The New Zealand Census indicates a higher proportion of Tuvaluans being born in Tuvalu, which illustrates the significance of New Zealand as a long term destination for Tuvaluan migrants.

New Zealand has an annual quota of 75 Tuvaluans to be granted work permits under the Pacific Access Category, as announced in 2001. Tuvaluans also have access to seasonal employment in the horticulture and viticulture industries in New Zealand under the Recognised Seasonal Employer (RSE) Work Policy introduced in 2007, allowing for employment of up to 5,000 workers from Tuvalu and other Pacific islands.

== Demographics ==
According to the 2006 Census, there were 2,625 Tuvaluans in New Zealand. This number has since grown to 3,537 in 2013, 4,653 in 2018 and 6,585 in 2023.

About 88% of Tuvaluan New Zealanders are English speakers and approximately 42% can speak another language, mainly the Tuvaluan language.

=== Religion ===
The vast majority of Tuvaluan New Zealanders (76.9%) follow Christianity while 8.7% of them don't identify with a religion, according to the most recent New Zealand Census.

In 1992, the Tuvalu Community Church congregation of Henderson, Auckland was established. In 2021, the first Tuvaluan Congregational church was opened. It was designed by South Pacific Architecture, which won a Public Architecture Award at the 2021 Auckland Architecture Awards.
