= Pacifica Mamas =

Arts collective in Auckland, New Zealand

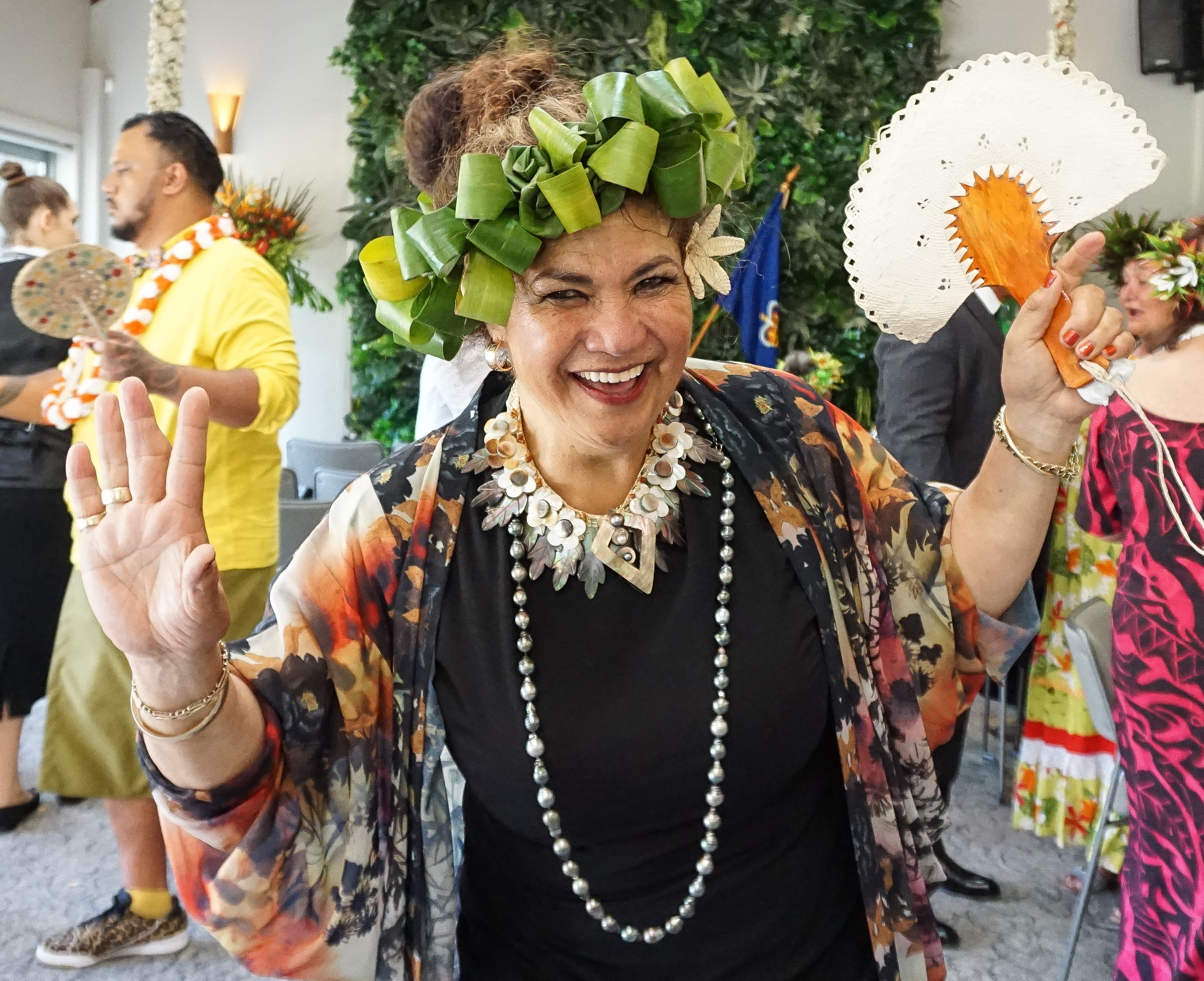
- Mary Ama one of the founders of Pacifica Mamas
- Formation: late 1980s
- Purpose: Traditional Pacific arts - creation and teaching
- Headquarters: Pacifica Arts Centre, Corbans Estate, Henderson, Auckland
- Website: https://www.pacificaarts.org/who-we-are/the-pacifica-mamas/

The Pacifica Mamas Arts and Cultural Trust is an arts collective based in Auckland, New Zealand, with the mission to pass on traditional Pacific arts. The arts collective are based at the Pacifica Arts Centre, located in the Corban Estate Arts Centre.

== Establishment ==
Established in the late 1980s, the centre's vision is to develop and support Pacific arts and cultural projects, with a focus on Pacific heritage art practices. They are known as the Pacifica Mamas and also as the Pacifica Mamas and Papas. Mary Ama and Teuke Malaga were two of the founders. The collective was formed from first-generation Pacific immigrants to New Zealand. There are many Pacific Island nations represented amongst the collective including the Cook Islands, Samoa, Tuvalu, Tonga, Tokelau, Kiribati and Niue.

The collective were based in a single room shed at the Corban Estate Arts Centre until 2004, when the shed caught fire.

== Activities ==
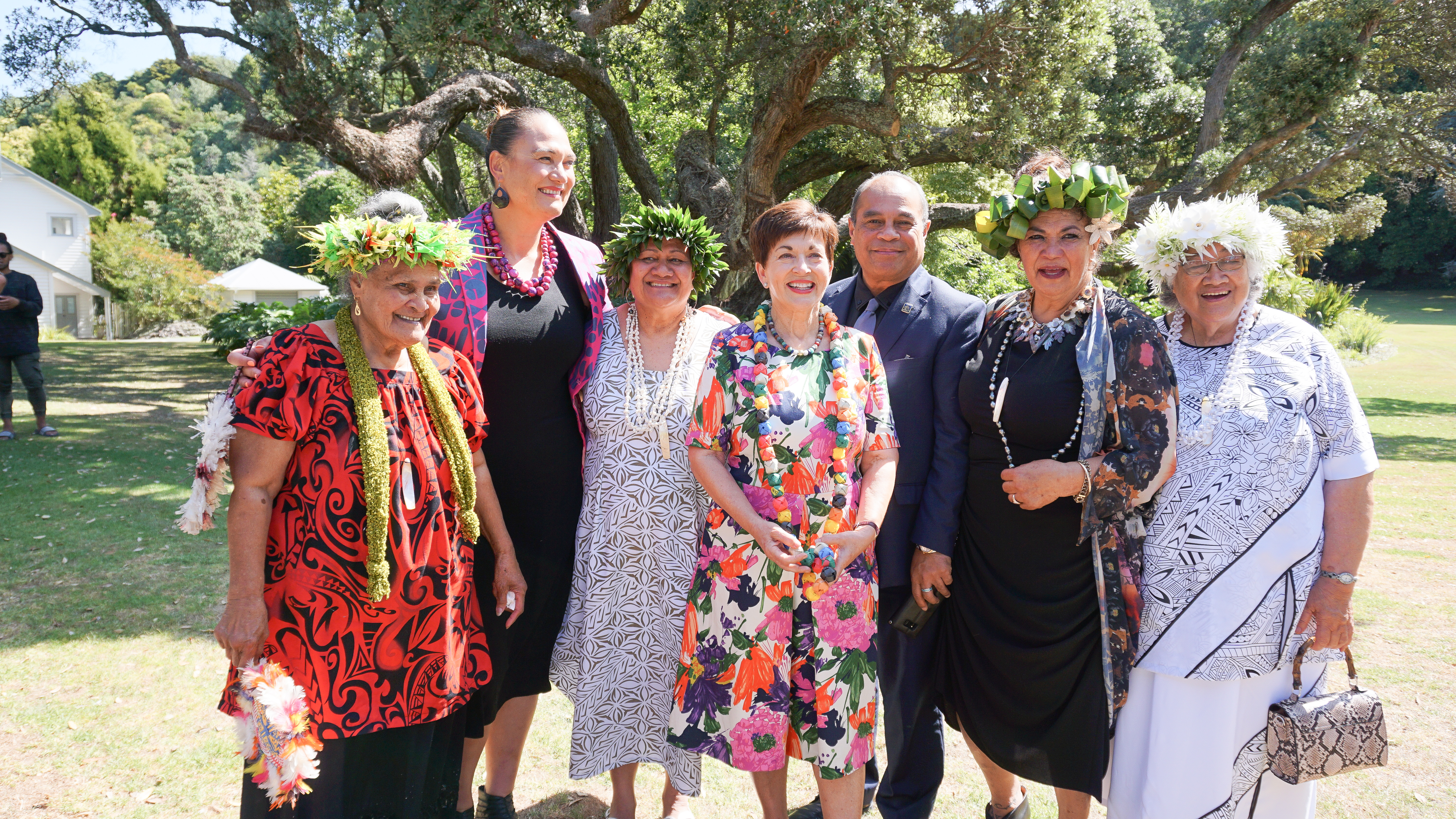
Pacifica Mamas & dignitaries at a Matairangi Mahi Toi reception at Government House, Wellington, New Zealand

The collective has a home base called the Pacifica Arts Centre at Corban Estate Art Centre in West Auckland. The collective provides 'guidance and support' to other Pacific arts collectives and artists.

Regular workshops are held by the Pacifica Mamas at their Pacifica Arts Centre. This includes a schools programme where students learn some Pacific weaving, drumming and dance. The centre's director is Jarcinda Stowers-Ama.

The Pacifica Mamas Trust governs the annual Pacifica Living Arts Festival held at Corban Estate that consists of arts, crafts, traditional food and school groups performing.

Pacifica Mamas Arts and Cultural Trust and the Pacifica Arts Centre receive funding from Creative New Zealand as part of the 2020 Toi Uru Kahikatea programme.

Some members of the collective are Maria Fastnidge (Samoan/Chinese descent), Mary Ama (Rarotonga), Mata Smith (Niue) and Tiana Epati (Samoa).

== Awards ==
2012 - Pacific Heritage Art Award, Arts Pasifika Awards (awarded to Mary Ama and the Pacifica Mamas)

2015 - Arts Access Corrections Community Award (awarded to Mary Ama and the Pacifica Mamas)
