= Mary Ama =

Cook Islands–New Zealand activist

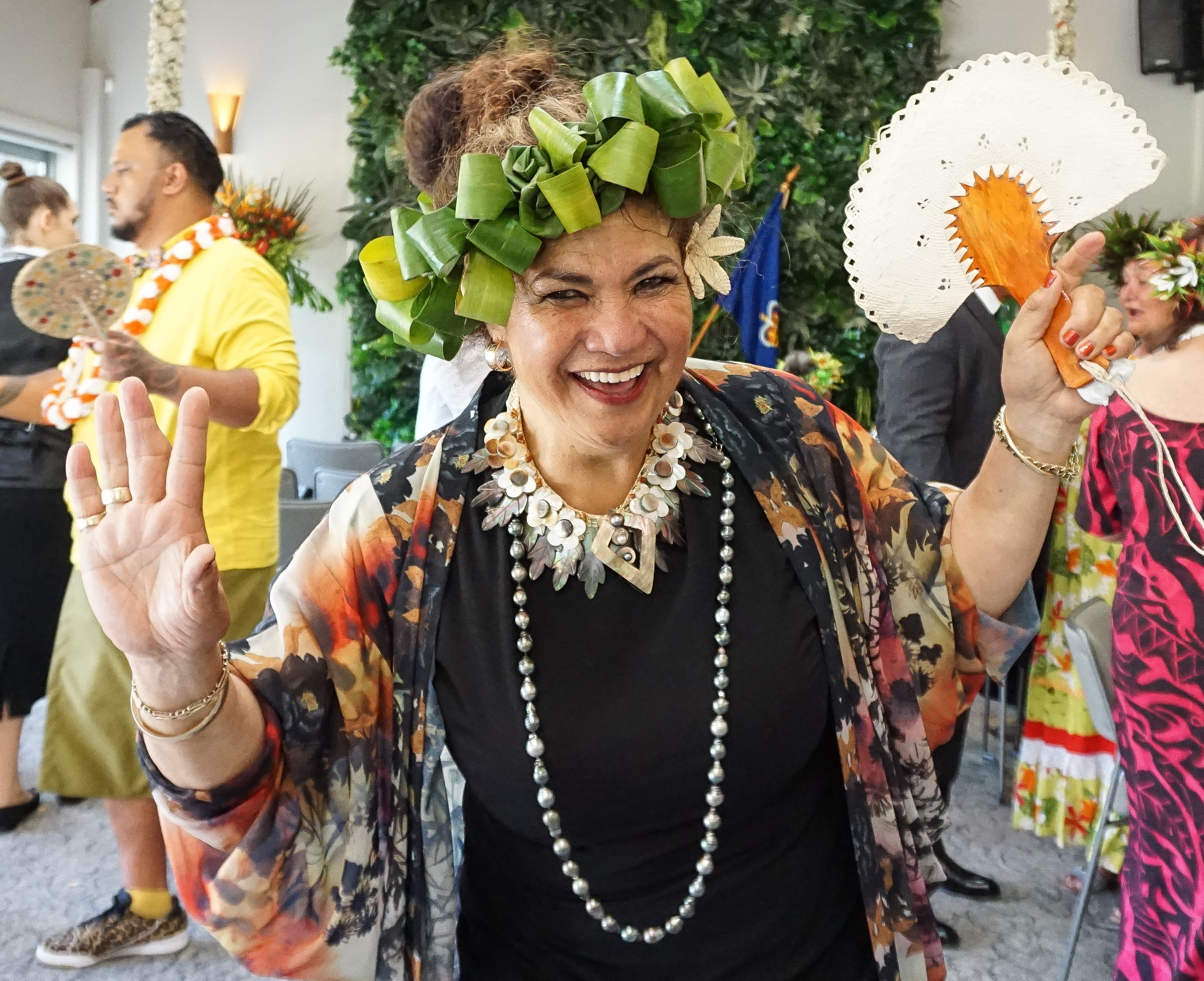
Ama in 2020

Mary Tupai Ama CNZM is a Cook Islands–New Zealand artist and community arts organiser.

== Biography ==
Ama was born in Vaka Takitumu in the southeast of the island of Rarotonga in the Cook Islands, and has Cook Island Maori, Samoan and English heritage. Her mother died when Ama was young and her father remarried, and Ama was raised by her grandparents. Ama immigrated to New Zealand in 1965, and worked for various government departments.

Ama founded Pacifica Mamas, a community arts collective based in Auckland, New Zealand, in the late 1980s. The collective designs and delivers Pacific-based arts and cultural programmes in schools and the community both in New Zealand and overseas in the Cook Islands, Samoa, Papua New Guinea, Hawaii, the United Kingdom and the United States. Ama also developed a programme for Pacific prison inmates, which she has delivered at Spring Hill Correction Facility near Huntly for more than ten years. Ama has been the Pacific Island Arts Advocate for the Waitakere City Council and has taught at both Mt Albert Grammar School and Corbans Estate Arts Centre.

In 1998, Ama began working for the Waitakere City Council, and as a part of Pacifica Mamas began teaching tivaevae classes in 1999.

She has delivered other Pacific arts, culture and community projects for Museum of New Zealand Te Papa Tongarewa, Auckland War Memorial Museum, Auckland Council, Auckland Art Gallery Toi o Tamaki, and ASB Polyfest.

=== Recognition ===
In 2012, the collective won the Creative NZ Pacific Heritage Arts Award. In 2015, Ama and the Pacifica Mamas won the Arts Access Corrections Community Award for their work at Spring Hill. In the 2017 Queen's Birthday Honours, Ama was appointed a Companion of the New Zealand Order of Merit, for services to the arts and the Pacific community.
