= Papua New Guinean New Zealanders =

Total population
- 2023 Census: 1,131 (by birth) (by ancestry)

Regions with significant populations
- Auckland: 507
- Canterbury: 213
- Wellington: 162
- Waikato: 147
- Bay of Plenty: 102

Languages
- English · Tok Pisin · Motu

Religion
- Christianity (Predominantly Roman Catholicism) · Other

Papua New Guinean New Zealanders (Tok Pisin: pipol bilong Papua Niugini long Niu Zilen) are Papua New Guineans, or people of Papua New Guinean descent, who are also citizens and residents of New Zealand.

Papua New Guinea was administered by Australia until 1975, formally divided into the Territory of Papua and the Territory of New Guinea (a League of Nations mandate). The indigenous peoples of Papua New Guinea were nonetheless subject to the White Australia policy, and only limited numbers were allowed to enter the rest of Australia – notably to work in the Queensland pearling industry.

The number of Papua New Guineans in New Zealand is considered relatively small, given the countries are neighbours and PNG's status as a former Australian territory. Other Pacific island countries have much larger populations in New Zealand. At the time of the 2018 New Zealand census, there were 1,131 Papua New Guineans in New Zealand. This has increased 1,290 Papua New Guineans at the 2023 New Zealand census.

== See also ==
- Papuan people
- New Zealand–Papua New Guinea relations
