= Hens' Teeth =

Woman-only comedy troupe in New Zealand

Hens' Teeth Women's Comedy Company, also known as Hens' Teeth, is a woman-only comedy troupe based in Wellington, New Zealand, founded in 1988. As of 2025, it appears to be dormant.

== Background ==
After attending a women's comedy festival in Sydney Kate JasonSmith founded Hens' Teeth in time to debut just before Christmas in 1988. It was a success, breaking box-office records for Wellington's Circa Theatre. The company's name comes from the saying 'as rare as hens’ teeth' pointing to the scarcity of female comedians working professionally in New Zealand.

Between 1988 and 2001 Kate JasonSmith produced regular performances of Hens Teeth mostly in Wellington featuring over 100 women. Performers included: Ginette McDonald, Rima te Wiata, Emily Perkins, Cathy Sheat, Michelle Scullion, Ann Pacey, Riwia Brown, Ann Jones, Alison Wall, Pam Corkery, Perry Piercy, Nancy Fulford, Stephanie Creed, Vicki Walker, Donna Akersten, Jane Waddell, TV personality Chloe (Chloe Perovic), and Phylli JasonSmith. The core cast included Lee Hatherly, Dame Kate Harcourt, Lorae Parry, Pinky Agnew, Helen Moulder, Carmel McGlone, Sue Dunlop, Sally Rodwell, Madeline McNamara, Rose Beauchamp, Prue Langbein, Bub Bridger, April Phillips, and Darien Takle.

== Performance history and format ==
Each show was held together by a compere or M.C., with the most famous being "Mother Chook" (Lee Hatherly; full name, Leone Rosemary Lucille Hatherly). The usual format involved a comic line-up that changed nightly, with some regulars and some "tryouts." It has been described as "a variety show consisting of a series of comedy sketches" connected with the comediennes' identity as women. Hens' Teeth's success has been attributed to its focus on things that are part of the fabric of most women's lives: sex, politics, aging, cooking, ambition, breastfeeding, men, opera, housework, dieting, childcare, self-defense, love, money, contraception and creativity. The company's only major rule was that the performers' jokes should not come at the expense of men or other minorities.

The second season was called Hens' Teeth: The Second Bite at Taki Rua The Depot Theatre (Wellington) early in 1989 and had similar success to the first season.

In March 1990 Hens' Teeth was included in the biennial New Zealand International Festival of the Arts with the title Daughter of Hens’ Teeth with design by Debra Bustin and choreography by Jamie Bull; the performances were in the Illott Concert Chamber of the Wellington Town Hall; music was by Michelle Scullion and performers included Sandra McKay, Madeline McNamara, Helen Moulder, Lorae Parry, and Sally Rodwell.

The September 1991 Circa Theatre season, Hens' Teeth squawk this way: a season of women comedians included Lee Hatherly, Rose Beauchamp, Bub Bridger, Sue Dunlop, Madeline McNamara, Prue Langbein, Helen Moulder, Lorae Parry, and Dame Kate Harcourt. A group of performers may also have appeared on the night including Beryl Te Wiata, Sally Rodwell, Jane Waddell, and more.

The March 1996 Circa Theatre season, Hens' Teeth: Raw eggs and old boilers, featured Lee Hatherly, with Rose Beauchamp, Bub Bridger, Kate Harcourt, Lorae Parry, Madeline McNamara, Lindy Hatherly (Lee Hatherly's daughter, performing a fire-eating act), Sally Rodwell, Prue Langbein, Sue Dunlop, Marg Layton, Cathie Sheat, Pinky Agnew, April Phillips (then known as April Mardle), Carmel McGlone, Ann Pacey, and Dorothy McKegg. The group won the Chapman Tripp award for Female Comedian or Group of the Year in 1996.

In 1992 they performed at the Adelaide Fringe Festival in Adelaide, South Australia. In 1995–6 they toured South Island, which was filmed for a documentary.

The group was largely dormant from 2001 until 2017, when it returned as part of WTF! (Women's Theatre Festival). and then in December 2020 presented the sold-out season The Older the Better, featuring the talents of three 90-year-old performers.

== Significance in New Zealand culture ==
Hens' Teeth began as a reaction to the absence of professional opportunities for women in entertainment in New Zealand. Its legacy continues in on-going work by former members of the company. The problem it addressed has remained a topic of discussion and research for New Zealand women. Marian Evans completed a PhD on women's involvement in film production in New Zealand at Victoria University. Producer Kate JasonSmith undertook similar research (supported by the New Horizons for Women Trust), on proportion of women's roles on New Zealand stage and screen as part of an honours degree program in 2002 at Victoria University of Wellington. Circa Theatre in Wellington has been running a Women's Theatre Festival (WTF!) that uses some of this research.

Many of the women in Hens’ Teeth were recognizable figures before joining Hens' Teeth; for others, Hens' Teeth provided an opportunity to launch or develop their careers.

Some examples of work that has come out of Hens’ Teeth includes The Legend Returns by Helen Moulder and Rose Beauchamp. This is a show based on characters and skits developed in Hens Teeth. The Legend Returns has toured extensively around NZ and also San Francisco. Moulder's part in the duo is an "aging diva" called Cynthia Fortitude; Beauchamp is Gertie, the long-suffering, generally mute, but piano-playing sidekick. In 2018 the pair developed a sequel to The Legend Returns, called Cynthia and Gertie Go Baroque. The Legend Returns is a popular audio available in the Radio New Zealand collection.

Sally Rodwell published a book of monologues based on characters developed partly in Hens’ Teeth titled Gonne Strange Charity. Sally Rodwell and Madeline McNamara used Hens’ Teeth to explore characters of 'The Nobodies' which ended up being a show Crow Station that premiered in Wellington and then performed at the Magdalena Project women's festival in Cardiff in 1994. Rodwell and McNamara went on to form Magdalena Aotearoa, a New Zealand network of women performers.

Also produced after Hens’ Teeth had paved the way was a women's performance cabaret Not Broadcast Quality, with a wider programme than comedy including for example dance, music, theatre and mask and Women Off The Planet a women's music cabaret both ran for more than one year in the 1990s and both at Taki Rua The Depot Theatre.

Producer Kate JasonSmith wrote and performed in a solo show called I’ll Tell You This for Nothing - My Mother the War Hero, that premiered at BATS Theatre in Wellington and then performed at the Edinburgh Festival in 2019.
