= Rose Beauchamp =

New Zealand actress and puppeteer (1946–2022)

- Born: 26 October 1946
- Died: 5 January 2022 (aged 75)
- Occupations: Puppeteer; actor; musician

Rose Beauchamp (26 October 1946 – 10 January 2022) was a New Zealand puppeteer, actress, musician, and member of the Red Mole and Hens' Teeth theatre companies.

== Life and career ==
Rose Beauchamp Thomas was born in Auckland in 1946. In her 20s and 30s she travelled and lived in the Middle East and England, attending puppetry festivals in Europe. She married poet Ian Wedde at age 20; they were married for 20 years and had three sons.

She began performing, mostly as a musician, with White Rabbit Puppet Theatre, a branch of the Red Mole Theatre Company. She joined Red Mole in 1975 and began doing puppetry.

Beauchamp studied and performed puppetry in Japan. She attended the UNIMA World Puppet Festival in 1988 and was funded by the New Zealand–Japan Exchange Programme to study and perform with a puppet company in 1989. In 1990 she made her third trip to Japan to perform at a puppet festival on Shikoku Island. She travelled around Japan performing her puppet show with an anti-nuclear environmental message in schools and kindergartens. She observed similarities between Noroma puppetry and Māori puppetry (karetao, karari or toko raurape as they were respectively known to Tūhoe, Ngāti Porou and a far North tribe).

In 2015 she organised a puppet festival in Wellington.

Beauchamp performed as a comedy duo with actress Helen Moulder. In 1997 they wrote a full-length show The Legend Returns with Michael Wilson, based on a sketch for Hen's Teeth, which they toured in New Zealand and to San Francisco. Moulder played the opera singing heroine Miss Cynthia Fortitude and Beauchamp her accompanist, Miss Gertrude Rallentando. Their second production was Cynthia & Gertie Go Baroque! (2015). The Legend Returns was recorded by Radio New Zealand and is a popular audio, often requested. These characters were developed by Beauchamp and Moulder in Hens' Teeth, a women's comedy group. Beauchamp performed in Hens Teeth for a decade alongside many other performers including Lee Hatherly, Bub Bridger, Sue Dunlop, Lorae Parry, Rima Te Wiata and Kate Harcourt. Most recently Beauchamp performed at Circa Theatre in the show The Older the Better (2020).

She died in January 2022, at the age of 75.
