= Scarlet & Gold =

2016 New Zealand play by Lorae Perry

Scarlet & Gold is a stage play written by Lorae Parry and dramaturged by Kate JasonSmith. It is based around the historic events of the 1912 Goldminers' Strike in Waihi, New Zealand. The script was a finalist for the 2016 Adam NZ Play Award.

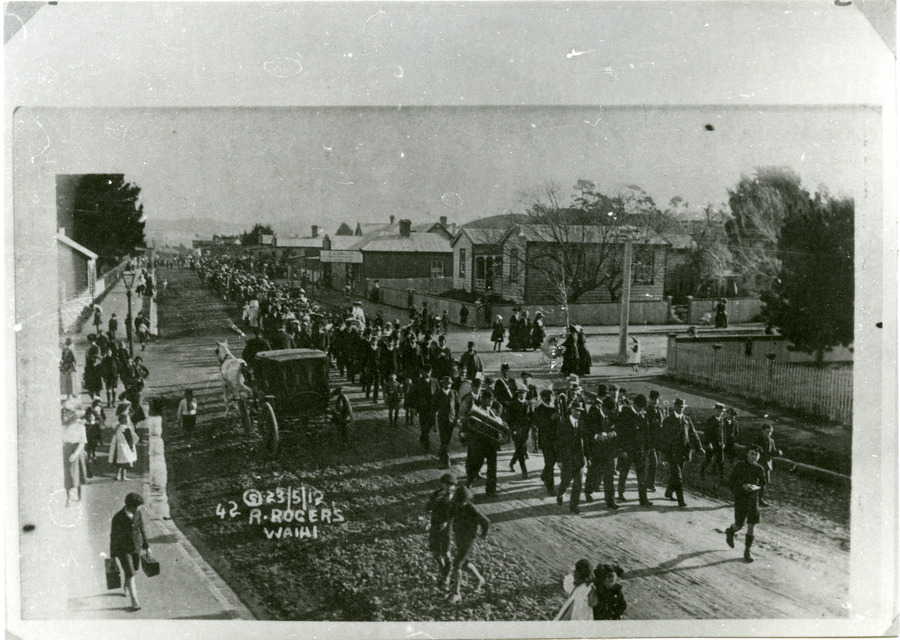
Waihi miner's strike 1912

The Waihi strike was the first union action in New Zealand where women played an active and innovative part. The play follows the changing fortunes of women from the three sectors that clashed dramatically in Waihi: the striking miners; the mine owners and shareholders; and the workers who crossed the line.

The cast is 4 women, 4 men, and 2 children. Some of the characters are based on real people, such as Fred & May Evans, and Bill & Georgina Parry. Other characters are fictional, in an imaginative re-rendering of the story. Bill (William) Parry, the great-grand-uncle of Lorae Parry, was the spokesman for the Miners' Union in Waihi, and later was instrumental in the formation of the NZ Labour Party, and was elected as a member of Parliament.

"Scarlet & Gold" had its first public reading at Circa Theatre, Wellington on 9 July 2016.

The play premiered at Circa Theatre in November 2016 for a 4-week season, directed by Kate JasonSmith and choreographed by Jan Bolwell, with set & lighting design by Lisa Maule, and costumes by Pinky Agnew. Laughton Pattrick was Musical Director and Neal Barber was Stage & Production Manager.

== Cast ==
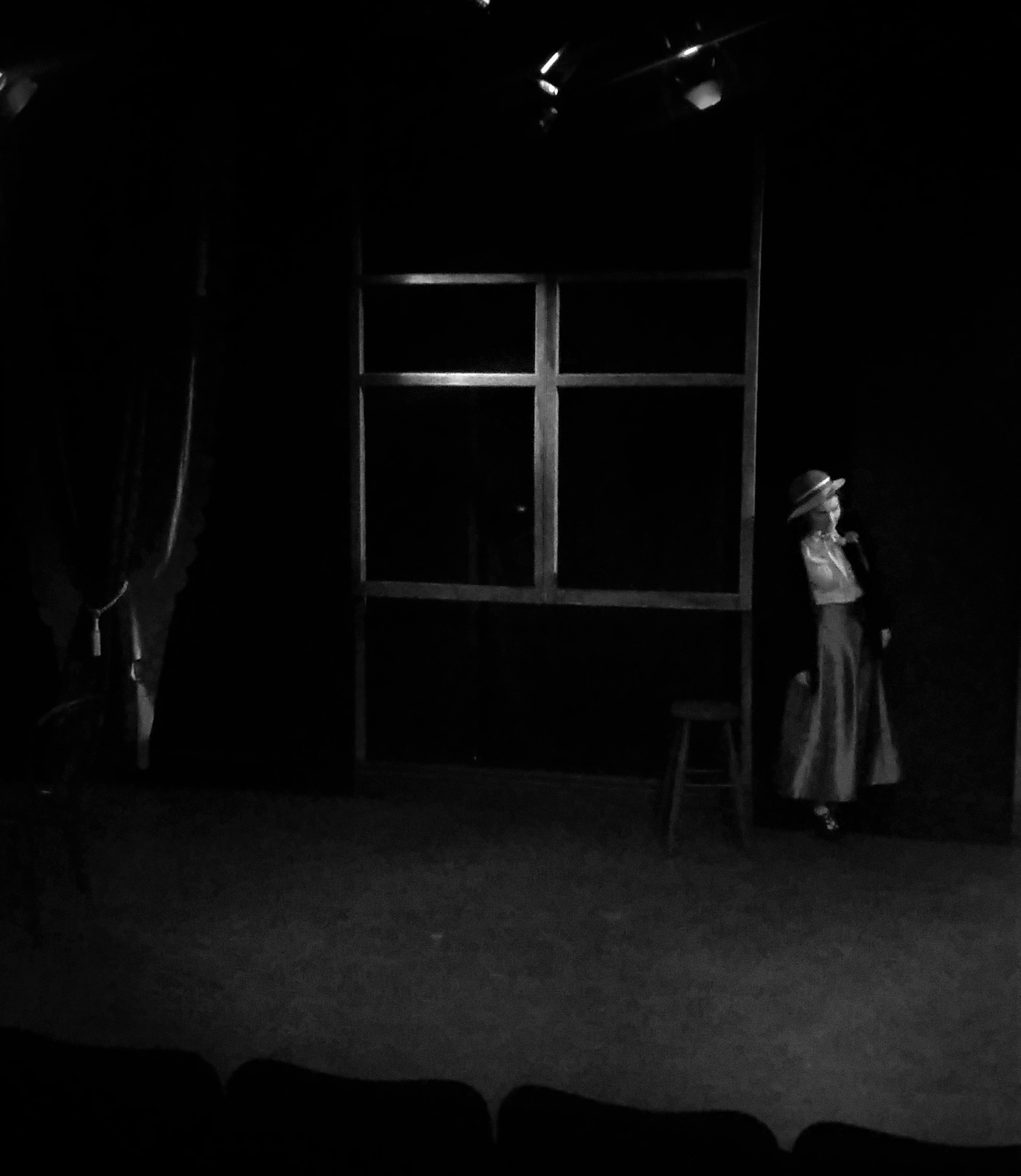
November 2016 production at the Circa Theatre in Wellington, New Zealand

The cast for the Premiere was:

- Lorae Parry as Jane Ashton, the wife of a Gold Boss
- Carmel McGlone as Mrs Burgess, the Ashton's housekeeper
- Emily Regtien as Katherine Beech, the wife of an injured miner
- Isobel MacKinnon as Emma Beech, daughter of Katherine, in love with Thomas
- Todd Rippon as Bill Parry, a trade unionist
- Jon Phelong as Fred Evans, a radical unionist
- James Gordon as Thomas O’Connor, son of Paddy, in love with Emma
- Paddy Davies as Paddy O’Connor, a miner
- Lola Gonzalez Boddy as Molly Beech, 12 year old daughter of Katherine
- Jack Archibald as Bobby O’Connor, 12 year old son of Paddy
- Maia Diamond as A Maori Kuia
- Cary Stackhouse as Herbert Kennedy, a union man
- Alexandra Taylor as May Evans, wife of Fred
- (All actors play several roles)
