= Kate JasonSmith =

New Zealand actress and filmmaker

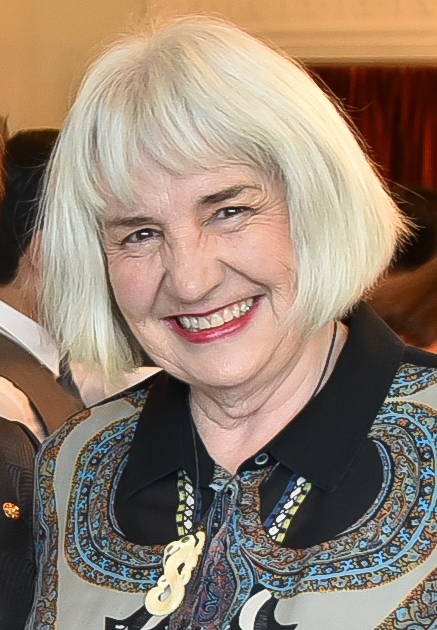
JasonSmith in 2020

Kate (Kathleen) JasonSmith (born 1950) is a New Zealand actor, producer, playwright, filmmaker, photographer, and businesswoman. Based in Wellington, she has studied and worked elsewhere, including Australia, Ireland, and the United Kingdom. A feminist, as a theatre and film practitioner, she has been most recognised throughout her career for her role in establishing and producing Hens' Teeth, a platform for dozens of Kiwi female actors, musicians, and comedians that became a staple of the New Zealand theatre and comedy scene between 1988 and 2003. Her television film, Xmas for Lou (1992), won the Best Drama – Television award in the New Zealand Film and Television Awards of 1994. From 2018 on, the one-woman show I'll Tell You This for Nothing: My Mother the War Hero has received national and international praise for both the play, which she wrote, and her performance.

== Early life and education ==
Kate JasonSmith was born in Eastbourne, England, in 1950. Her mother, Phyllis Helena Jean Garvin, Légion d’honneur, was a QA nurse on the European front during World War II; her father, Jason Lewis Francis Smith, MC, was an engineering officer in the British Army during the war, and an architect by profession after the war. Both Irish, her parents emigrated to New Zealand in part because her mother was Protestant and her father was Catholic.

Kate JasonSmith completed a Dip Design in 1967 from Wellington Polytechnic (where Len Lye also studied) Dip Film Planning and Production at the New South Wales Institute of Technology in Sydney in 1987. She received a BA in Theatre and Film from Victoria University of Wellington in 1998. In 2002 she received a Society for Research on Women (administered by the New Horizons for Women Trust) award to do research on the number and type of female roles on New Zealand stages and screens for the 2002 year; the results were part of work she did toward a BA (Hons).

== Feminism ==
"My first job at 18 was as an actress. Following fast upon the heels of the heady glory was the disgust that all the good parts were written for men. When I asked why, I was told 'Because women don't do anything interesting.' The real horror of that statement was that for years I believed it, in spite of the wealth of evidence around me to the contrary. Finally I asked the right question, why women weren't writing plays and was told 'You're a woman, why don't you write plays.' It was good advice—the reason I've created anything of importance in my life is because I've given up waiting for someone else to do it.'"

In 1971 Kate JasonSmith "heard that the [National] Film Unit were training people as directors. She had just completed a tour with Sam Neill and the New Zealand Players and thought: 'I'd be quite a good person because I've spent two years working as a professional actor and I've got a year at Design School. So I wrote and said I was interested in being trained as a director. And they wrote a letter back to me saying that they didn't train women as directors because they got married and had children.' To make it worse, Sam Neill applied at the same time for the same position and was accepted." Kate JasonSmith was also among a number of women who "were told they couldn't be camerawomen because the gear was too heavy—even though in Kate's case she had been carrying heavy mail bags up and down the hills of Wellington while working as a postie."

In 1976, Kate JasonSmith, along with Donna Cross, Christine Poland, and Nina Dawidowska, formed the idea of "a women-only art studio-gallery ... called Nga Tamahine Marama—the daughters of light, sun, moon and stars." Located in Wellington, it was later established by another team with the aim of encouraging "women to work according to their own way of seeing things, based on the premise that men and women view life from very different perspectives [because] in a male-dominated world, women's different insights and different kinds of creativity are too often scorned by the male critics." Hens' Teeth likewise included many sketches that involved the "deconstruction of gender on stage," as theatre historian Hannah Banks said with regard to regular acts involving irony resulting from cross-dressing characters.

This interest in women's opportunities within the creative arts has been a life-long concern for Kate JasonSmith. In 2016 and in 2018, Playmarket, "New Zealand's national playwriting agency," released statistical research on "what was being performed" over a given period of time in the country's major theatres, including information about the involvement of women relative to men. The later research "depicted the significant difference in the amount of works by women" that were performed. Adopting Māori cultural practice, Kate JasonSmith (along with Linda Wilson of Circa Theatre) called a "Hui on Women in Theatre" "to discuss the representation of women in New Zealand theatre," which was held "on the 19th September 2016, the 123rd anniversary of women gaining the right to vote in Aotearoa. ... Around one hundred people attended the two sessions at Circa Theatre in Wellington, ... made up ... predominantly of women, of all ages and stages in their careers including actors, directors, designers, writers, producers and academics."

Kate JasonSmith gave the first of two introductory presentations at this meeting, in which she "welcomed everyone and spoke of the times she has experienced injustice and discrimination against women in the New Zealand theatre industry." Among other things, this led to an interview broadcast on Standing Room Only, a weekly arts show aired nationally by Radio New Zealand. The follow-up meeting, an "all-day event" held on 11 March 2017 and "convened by Linda Wilson and Kate JasonSmith," featured a keynote address by Gaylene Preston, in which she "made the observation that corporate talk of goals and list making were not applicable to the theatrical life – career paths were replaced by "people who just do stuff." Nonetheless, as the hui closed "Kate JasonSmith introduced the concept of 50/50 by 20/20, meaning a goal of 50% participation and recognition of women in theatre by 2020."

=== Theatre ===
In 1969 Kate JasonSmith toured with Children's Art Theatre, a Whanganui based theatre company that toured primary schools in the North island of New Zealand.*Three shows a day, five days a week." An early play, Charge, "was performed on the London stage in 1978." Later in her career she directed Scarlet & Gold, a play written by Lorae Parry, that had its premiere at Circa Theatre in 2016 and was "a finalist for the 2016 Adam Play Award."

==== Hens' Teeth Women's Comedy Company ====
The name Hens' Teeth "pointed to the scarcity of female comedians"; the group's creation followed JasonSmith's "attendance at a women's comedy festival in Sydney." Under the larger heading of "Social issues on stage," Te Ara: The Encyclopedia of New Zealand devotes its paragraph on feminist cabaret to JasonSmith: "Second-wave feminism also picked up on the power of cabaret, initially with JasonSmith's The carefree show (1976) at Unity Theatre, Wellington" and then with Hens' Teeth, a women's comedy show." The show, what participant Madeline McNamara has called "feminist devised comedy," debuted in Wellington's Circa Theatre in December 1988 and "broke box office records." According to Hannah Banks, "A typical Hens' Teeth show would always start with the Mother Chook, Lee Hatherly," who would warm up the audience with direct—sometimes physically direct—interaction with the audience; "then what followed really was like a variety show. So it had its roots in music hall." "Hen's Teeth [sic] performed as a company regularly throughout the 1990s and then after a sixteen-year hiatus, they performed again at Circa Theatre in 2017 as part of WTF! Women's TheatreFestival." The group's producer throughout its existence, JasonSmith rarely appeared as a performer, although she was sometimes the MC. Comedians, actors, and musicians, and dozens of other major figures in New Zealand theatre, film, and television who were involved in the group included Dame Kate Harcourt and Dame Gaylene Preston.

==== I'll Tell You This for Nothing ====
Directed by Jan Bolwell, produced by Shirley Domb, with a soundscape by David Downes and the help of Deb Filler as dramaturge, the one-woman play I'll Tell You This for Nothing (subtitled My Mother the War Hero), written and acted by JasonSmith, honours Phyllis JasonSmith, JasonSmith's mother, covering her Irish Protestant background, her experiences as a nurse during WWII that earned her the French Légion d'honneur, her marriage to an Irish Catholic that led to their emigrating from Ireland to New Zealand, and the impact of this background and her mother's experience on JasonSmith herself. As well as being among the few nurses at the front from D-Day on, Phyllis was among the small number of medical personnel who went into Bergen Belsen once it was liberated. The play premiered at BATS Theatre in November 2018 and toured around New Zealand over the next few months. One early reviewer called the play "a show about the life of an ordinary woman who achieved extraordinary things" and said that it managed "to create an effective balance between personal experience and the larger historical events through which Phyllis moves."

Another reviewer, writing shortly after the Christchurch massacre in 2019, noted "the underbelly of racism and religious intolerance in our communities. Against this backdrop, the story of Phyllis JasonSmith's experiences as a nurse in the last days of World War II is all the more poignant, all the more valid. ... Probably the most poignant aspect of Phyllis' story is that ... as an Irish Protestant, Phyllis knows her mother will never accept her Irish Catholic beau, but there is no denying the love and friendship that springs up between them amidst the violent explosions of wartime Europe. ... She has seen first-hand the impact of religious hatred and bigotry, and she will never allow these feelings to take root within her."

Cut to just under 60 minutes to fit the Edinburgh Fringe Festival format, I'll Tell You This for Nothing had a month-long run there in 2019. Promotional material for this iteration of the play described it as follows: "Irish-born Phyllis was one of only two New Zealand women ever to have been honoured with France's highest decoration, the Légion d'Honneur, for extreme bravery in WWII. She spoke of bombs screaming overhead, crawling around the hospital tents on their knees, the constant stream of wounded and dying soldiers. Not all her stories were tragic, most had a lighter side, a twist, a punchline. Award-winning director and actor JasonSmith brings to life the dramatic and often humorous tale of her mother's life in this acclaimed show about war, courage and romance." Acting the various characters involved in her mother's experiences, JasonSmith makes use of her skill with accents from various languages and regions. The Scotsman's reviewer wrote that she "is a brisk and lively solo storyteller, and her facility for accents helps her paint a picture of those times through its characters, particularly when she inhabits her wide-eyed young Irish mother and the much older woman reminiscing with the young Kate."

=== Film and television ===
As an actor, JasonSmith has appeared in Peter Jackson's splatstick film Braindead (1992), as well as The Hobbit (2012). She also had a role in Gaylene Preston's Bread and Roses (1993), as well as other New Zealand films and television productions. "In the 1970s she worked as a television designer in Dublin and for the BBC."

In 1987 "Kate JasonSmith and a collective of Australian film-makers directed The Quick Window ... a non-linear narrative on the margin of memory and fantasy in an old man's mind."

The bulk of her other film work (apart from acting) "reflects her interest in exploring her experiences and choices as a woman."

JasonSmith's work as a film and television director from 1985 through 1996 has included short, semi-experimental student films, a dramatic short drama, an episode of a television arts program, and a short drama commissioned by the Wellington South Community Law Centre "exploring legal issues for lesbians." Reflections (1981), for example, is a 2-minute film, shown at the Sydney 8mm film festival that involves images interpreting a poem read in voice-over; "I was trying to do to poetry what people were just starting at that time to do to music with video clips." The Quick Window (1988) is set in a Sydney café, features an elderly male protagonist, and uses the café's glass window in part to reflect the man's memories as well as show the present. It was edited by Annie Collins and features Australian as well as New Zealand actors such as Jennifer Ludlam and Cathy Downes, along with JasonSmith's own mother, Phyllis.

==== Xmas for Lou ====
"In the early 90s, having been offered a number of projects that were too long to be short films, [producer Robin] Laing came up with the idea of an anthology series for television." Working through her own Meridian Films production company, and increasingly "concerned about the lack of New Zealand drama, and more importantly the lack of women's perspective on television, [Laing] gathered together an impressive line-up of female film-makers and produced a four-part Anthology Drama series." The individual films were "ultimately screened in two different slots, including as the first Kiwi entries on the Montana Sunday Theatre series." The directors included Gaylene Preston (Married), Shereen Maloney (Mother Tongue), Pat Robins (Matrons of Honour), and JasonSmith (Xmas for Lou); the writers included Sue McCauley and Joy Cowley, both well-known New Zealand authors at that point; editors Dell King and Annie Collins, and composers Jan Preston and Michelle Scullion. Xmas for Lou (1992), a short drama of 52 minutes made on 16mm in colour, celebrates 1950s New Zealand culture while presenting "a story of adoption and of the love and hate between two sisters." Executive produced by Robin Laing and produced and edited by Annie Collins, a 50-minute version of it aired on New Zealand television as part of the Work of Art series in 1993. It also had a screening at Wellington's City Gallery on 28 November 1993 as part of a series of film screenings to celebrate the Centenary of Suffrage in New Zealand.

Writing about "women's film in Aotearoa New Zealand in 1973–1993," Deborah Shepard includes JasonSmith's Xmas for Lou along with films by Jane Campion and Anna Campion in a discussion of themes appearing towards the end of that period. They all present "the family as a melting pot of chaotic and perverse emotions" along with "the vulnerability of the young girl [protagonist] caught up in perplexing adult emotions." Xmas for Lou shares Kiwi Christmas traditions combined with a beach setting with contemporaneous examples of Kiwi film and theatre, e.g., Dorthe Scheffmann's short film The Beach (1995) and Robert Lord's last play, Joyful and Triumphant, which was first performed on stage in 1992 and then adapted for television and broadcast around Christmastime in 1993.

Xmas for Lou also "broke new ground" in its portrayal of "the fierce ambivalence between sisters," played by Joanne Simpson and Madeline McNamara, who was part of the Hens' Teeth company. Following passage in 1985 of the Adult Adoption Information Act, adoption remained a current issue for discussion into the 1990s.

== Additional professional activities ==
In 1993, at the request of Jenny Stevenson, Kate JaspnSmith designed the curriculum for the Wellington Performing Arts Centre Acting Course, and taught screen acting at the full-time school. Both she and Lorae Parry were tutors for acting on screen at the Performing Arts Centre, Wellington for over a decade. In 2002/03 JasonSmith researched the funding available for women working in New Zealand theatre, film, and television as well as statistics on roles for women both on stage/in front of the camera and behind the scenes/below the line.

With her partner, Francesca Brice, Kate JasonSmith set up Pacific Perfumes Ltd in 2002, through which they manufacture and sell solid perfumes and other products in Aotearoa New Zealand as well as overseas. In 2011 the company participated in an international competition, the HBA International Package Design Awards, and won top honours in the green category, beating such competitors as "the Estee Lauder subsidiary Aveda." The award led to access to the US market as well as "inquiries from South Africa, Australia and the UK"; half their product already went "mainly to the tourist markets in Fiji and Hawaii but also to various stores in Canada and Australia, and to online retailers." In 2011 the company was selling "about 30,000 pots of cream perfume annually."

== Filmography ==
=== Director ===
- 1975, Meanwhile (documentary; co-film maker with Annie Collins, Donna Cross, Jerry Smith, and others)
- 1982, Reflections (2 min; director; Australia)
- 1982, Shifting (drama – director)
- 1987, The Quick Window (15 min; experimental; writer, director, producer; New Zealand/Australia)
- 1992, Xmas for Lou (TV drama; director)
- 1993, The Edge (TV arts series; episode director)
- 1995, Mel's Amazing Movies (children's TV drama; director)
- 1996, Lesbians and the Law (14 min drama; director)

=== Actor ===
- 1992, Braindead Mother at Park (US title: Dead Alive – Peter Jackson, director)
- 1993, Bread and Roses (Gaylene Preston, director)
- 1997, Mirror Mirror Doctor (NZ television drama)
- 1999, Ouch Isabel (Short film: Brian Challis, director; Ainsley Gardiner, producer)
- 2003–2005, Freaky Mrs Bond (NZ television series)
- 2009, Separation City Female Guest No. 1 (as Kate Jason Smith)
- 2012, The Hobbit Featured Extra (Peter Jackson, director)
