= Coup D'etat (band) =

New Zealand band

- Origin: New Zealand
- Years active: 1980–1982
- Label: Vertigo Records
- Past members: Harry Lyon (Guitar / Vocals); Jan Preston (Keyboards / Vocals); Neil Hannan (Bass Guitar); Steve Osborne (Drums); Paul Dunningham (Drums)

Coup D'État was a New Zealand band active between 1980 and 1982. Members included Harry Lyon, previously (and subsequently) of Hello Sailor, Jan Preston and Neil Hannan of Red Mole, and drummer Paul Dunningham. Originally, Preston and Hannan were members of the band Wolfgang with drummer Steve Osborne. Harry Lyon joined the band, which was then renamed Coup D'État.

== History ==
The band is best known for their New Zealand top ten hit "Doctor I Like Your Medicine" (written and sung by Lyon), which won Single of the Year at the 1981 New Zealand Music Awards.

Neither their first single "No Music on My Radio" (sung by Preston), nor later single "Permanent Hire" (sung by Lyon) equalled the success of "Doctor I Like Your Medicine". Their self-titled album, released in 1981, reached 14 in the national charts.

Preston left the band in 1981. The band reformed with a new lineup in 1982, but soon afterwards broke up permanently.

== Legacy ==
Lyon joined fellow ex-Hello Sailor member Graham Brazier's band The Leigonnaires, which eventually led to a full Hello Sailor reunion.

Paul Dunningham joined Mi-Sex.

Preston went on to have a lengthy solo career as a boogie-woogie pianist and singer.

== Discography ==
Albums

- (1981) Coup D'etat / Vertigo Records

Singles

- (1980) "Doctor I Like Your Medicine" / Vertigo Records
- (1980) "No Music on My Radio" / Vertigo Records
