= Sally Rodwell =

New Zealand artist (1950–2006)

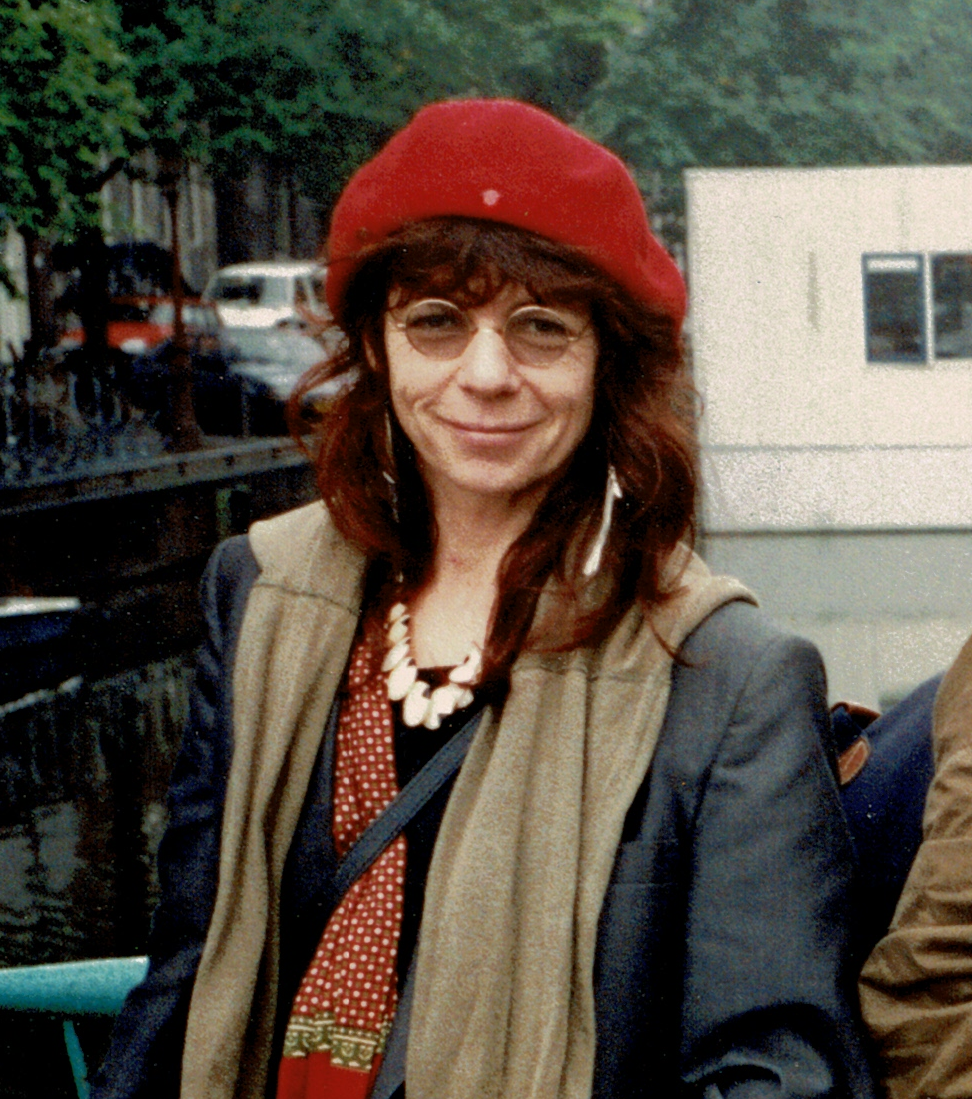
- Sally Rodwell on tour with the show Crow Station in 1994 in Amsterdam
- Born: 16 May 1950
- Died: 15 October 2006 (aged 56); Wellington, New Zealand
- Known for: Red Mole Theatre Company; Magdalena Aotearoa; performer, director, writer, film-maker
- Spouse: Alan Brunton

Sally Katherine Rodwell (16 May 1950 – 15 October 2006) was a New Zealand multi-disciplinary artist who worked mainly in the fields of theatre, film, and poetry. Her creative work included performing, directing and writing; making masks, puppets and costumes; film-making, illustration and publishing. She was a co-founder with Alan Brunton of the iconic Red Mole Theatre Company in 1974 and with Madeline McNamara of Magdalena Aotearoa in 1997.

== Biography ==
Rodwell was born in Dunedin in 1950 and spent her later childhood in Rotorua, attending Rotorua Intermediate School and Rotorua Girls’ High School. She graduated with an MA in English from the University of Auckland in 1970. Other education included a diploma in Russian language, and teaching English to Speakers of Other Languages (ESOL). While at university in Auckland Rodwell was Director of the University Arts Centre and Cultural Affairs Officer for the Students’ Association, she chaired the University Theatre Company, and she was also part of the Student Capping Week Revue in 1970 called Was 1969 Really Necessary?. In 1973 she taught English and drama at Selwyn College in Auckland.

From 1988, she lived in Island Bay, Wellington, with Alan Brunton and their daughter Ruby. She was actively involved with community organisations and projects including Peace Movement Aotearoa, the Southern Environmental Association and the Island Bay Residents Association. Rodwell and Brunton rehearsed in Island Bay at the Island Bay Surf Club and also the historic building of Erskine College. In 1992, the Save Erskine College Trust (SECT) was established to save the building from demolition, with Brunton an original trustee.

Following the sudden death of her husband and artistic partner Alan Brunton in 2002, Rodwell struggled with depression and ultimately chose to take her own life on 15 October 2006. A few months earlier she had collaborated on a radio documentary to help raise awareness about depression.

== Career ==
Rodwell and Brunton founded Red Mole Theatre Company in 1974, which quickly established itself at the forefront of New Zealand's avant-garde. Rodwell was a key member of the troupe, participating as a performer, co-author, maker of masks and costumes, and film-maker. From 1978 to 1988 the company traveled extensively in Mexico, the USA, and Europe, for much of that time based in New York.

After returning to Wellington, Rodwell continued to collaborate with Brunton and Red Mole, as well as leading workshops for and performing with the women's comedy company Hen's Teeth. It was here that she met and began to collaborate with Madeline McNamara. They created the show Crow Station which they toured to the Magdalena Project Festival in Cardiff, Wales, in 1994. This experience inspired Rodwell and McNamara to mount a similar festival in New Zealand. They founded the Magdalena Aotearoa Trust in 1997 and gathered a team of local women to organise the 1999 Magdalena Aotearoa International Festival of Women's Performance in Wellington and Paekakariki, March-April 1999. The Trust continues to organise events and host international artists.

Rodwell worked in a theatre company called Roadworks. In 2000 she directed and adapted O Fortuna by G. G. Marquez, starring Angeline Conaghan, Bridget Kelly and Tahi Mapp-Boren.

== Selected works ==
- Crow Station (performance), 1993. Sally Rodwell, Madeline McNamara.
- Shoes (short film), 1997. Director: Sally Rodwell. Producer: Glenis Giles, Oliver Giles Productions. Writer: Robin Nathan. Music by Plan 9 and Robin Nathan. https://www.nzonscreen.com/title/shoes-1996
- Gonne Strange Charity (book), 2000. A playscript of three monologues: "Rhonda", "Ballad of Stella Strange", and "Charity Cartwright's Family Disunion". Sally Rodwell with Alan Brunton. Bumper Books. ISBN 0-9583649-9-0
- Crazy Voyage (documentary film about the 1999 Magdalena Aotearoa International Festival of Women's Performance). Directed by Sally Rodwell and Alan Brunton. Produced by Red Mole, 2001.
- Grooves of Glory (performance), 2002. Sally Rodwell, Alan Brunton, Jeff Henderson.
- Demeter's Dark Ride - an Attraction (promenade performance), 2005, BATS Theatre, Wellington. Directed by Madeline McNamara. Produced by Helen Varley Jamieson.
