= Don't Touch Me (disambiguation) =

Don't Touch Me may refer to:

== Songs ==
- Don't Touch Me (Jeannie Seely song) a song by Jeannie Seely written by Hank Cochran, covered by Bettye Swann
- Don't Touch Me (Busta Rhymes song), see Don't Touch Me (Throw da Water on 'em)
- Don't Touch Me (Hazel O'Connor song), N. O'Connor, E. Case 1984
- "Sondaeji-ma", Don't Touch Me (Ailee song)
- "Don't Touch Me", a song by The Drongos Mitchell 1982
- "Don't Touch Me", a song by Starfighters (band) Burton, Dennis, Hambly, Young
