= Aberration (film) =

- French DVD cover
- Directed by: Tim Boxell
- Written by: Darrin Oura; Scott Lew
- Produced by: Chris Brown; Tim Sanders
- Starring: Pamela Gidley; Simon Bossell; Valery Nikolaev; Helen Moulder; Norman Forsey
- Cinematography: Allen Guilford
- Edited by: John Gilbert
- Music by: David Donaldson
- Distributed by: Grundy Films; Victor Film Company
- Release date: 11 September 1997 (Sweden)
- Running time: 93 minutes
- Countries: New Zealand; United States
- Language: English
- Budget: $4,000,000 (NZD)

Aberration is a 1997 horror film directed by Tim Boxell. It was set in the United States and shot in New Zealand, and stars Pamela Gidley as a woman who moves to her old childhood cabin in the woods, only to discover that it is overrun by a pack of murderous lizards.

== Plot ==
An oddball animal biologist local field researcher named Marshall Clarke (Simon Bossell) is investigating the disappearance of local wildlife, and stumbles upon an unidentified slimy residue. Meanwhile, a woman named Amy Harding (Pamela Gidley) moves into her old cabin in the woods of Langdon, where she spent her family holidays as a child, along with her cat, Frankie, a large sum of money, and all of the personal belongings. While attempting to make the cabin habitable, Amy realises that a moist substance has spoiled a piece of cake she is about to eat and fears she may have mice. Outside, she meets Mr. Peterson (Norman Forsey), looking for his dog Florence, which was killed by an unseen creature, he tells her to get out of Langdon.

She goes to the general store owned by Mrs. Miller (Helen Moulder), and asks her for some mouse traps, but she says that they are out of stock and instead tries some insect repellent. Back at the cabin, she discovers that Frankie's bowl is empty, and she gives him canned food. As she takes a bath, the lights goes out and she goes to her shed to check the generator. While there, slimy residue falls into her hair. Amy returns to the general store where Mrs. Miller loans her a poison sprayer. There, she meets Marshall and explains her situation, who drives her back to the cabin when her own car breaks down. As they get back to the cabin, they search the kitchen and something bites Amy's hand. Marshall discovers the remains of Amy's cat Frankie on the bathroom floor during the search. They finally kill one of the lizard-like creatures, which Marshall reveals to be a mutant gecko that can spit blinding venom to paralyze its prey. They attempt to leave in the middle of a snow storm and drive away before crashing.

They eventually approach Mr. Peterson's cabin and find that, it too, has been infested by the creatures as they devour his body. Amy blows up Mr. Peterson's cabin, and in the process, his truck, too. They now have no other alternative but to take refuge in Amy's cabin until the storm passes. As they fight for their lives, Marshall is attacked and blinded by the poisonous venom of one the lizards, while Amy sacrifices her goldfish by drowning a lizard, only to discover that the creatures are amphibious, forcing her to electrocute it by throwing a lamp into the fishtank. She then completely destroys the remaining eggs in the attic.

The following morning Marshall realises that his eyesight has returned when he awakes to the sound of someone outside. He meets Amy's ex-boyfriend Uri Romanov (Valery Nikolaev), who knocks Marshall unconscious. Amy finds new eggs hatching in the closet before encountering Uri, where it is revealed that Amy's real name is Alex and that she fled him with her own money, which he claims is his. She attempts to lead Uri into a trap by telling him the money is in the closet, but to no avail, when he shoots down the lizards. Amy eventually gives in and tells him that the money is in the attic. Amy then attacks Uri. He falls into the fireplace, causing eggs to fall onto his head and lizards to begin to eat him alive, prompting Amy to shoot him repeatedly. She and Marshall set the cabin on fire, but she fails in her attempt to accumulate the money before the cabin burns down.

They both escape in Uri's car as the cabin burns. The car starts to break down and Marshall goes to look under the hood, where he finds eggs hatching in it. Suddenly, lizards start pop out of various places inside the car, attacking Amy. Marshall tells her to unlock the door after she accidentally locked it in her panic. He takes a cigar she had lit and throws it into the gas tank, blowing up the car while simultaneously killing the lizards. He carries an unconscious Amy to the general store and insists Mrs. Miller help him extract a lizard that has eaten through Amy's leg. When it is removed, it causes Amy to scream in pain. When Marshall is searching the store for lizard, he is unaware that it is killing Mrs. Miller. He manages to locate a flare gun, but before he can finish loading it, the lizard attacks him and begins to scratch and bite him. Suddenly, Amy shows up and grabs the flare gun, shooting the lizard in the mouth. Sent flying, the lizard hits the wall and explodes. Amy and Marshall collapse on the floor and kiss.

== Cast ==
- Simon Bossell as Marshall Clarke
- Pamela Gidley as Amy Harding / Alex Langdon
- Valery Nikolaev as Uri Romanov
- Helen Moulder as Mrs. Miller
- Norman Forsey as Mr. Peterson
- Merlin The Cat as Frankie The Cat
- Frank Welker as The Geckos

== Release ==
=== Reception ===
The film has received a mixed critical reception. On Rotten Tomatoes, it has received three reviews, one positive and two negative. Jessica Mellor at the News of the World has said the film is "absolutely excellent entertainment...a startling and scary cheeky treat". Video World has said that the film is "a rampaging, monster-packed, jugular-piercing fear flick". Impact has said that the film has "laughs, loves & lizards from hell...what more could you ask for?!". Samhain has said "size doesn't matter...these lizards are lethal", and Starburst has said there is "gore galore in this intriguing creature-feature". Efilmcritic.com has said that "for ninety three minutes, this is one long dull boring film".

=== Home Video ===
The film has been released on VHS and DVD format. However, the film is almost impossible to find. It made its release in the United States on VHS on 30 March 1999, by Artisan Entertainment. It was also made available in the UK on 3 August 1998 via Marquee Pictures. The film has never been made available in the United States or UK on DVD.

The DVD has been released in other countries such as Japan on 22 December 2000, by Adoba Pictures, with both English and Japanese Dolby Digital 2.0 stereo tracks and an aspect ratio of 4:3. The DVD is also available in France, and Norway, in which the Norwegian DVD has the original English language, but the Norwegian subtitles are not removable. The DVD also made its release in Germany on 15 May 2012, titled as "Echsenjagd", with both English and German Dolby Digital 2.0 stereo tracks.
