= Samhain (disambiguation) =

Samhain is a Gaelic festival.

Samhain may also refer to:

- Samhain (band), an American rock band
- Samhain (magazine), an Irish theatrical periodical
- Samhain (software), a file integrity checker
- Samhain (Ghostbusters), a character from The Real Ghostbusters
- NWA Samhain, a 2023 professional wrestling pay-per-view event produced by the National Wrestling Alliance

== See also ==
- Sam Hain (b. 1995), cricketer
- Irish mythology in popular culture
- Samhan, a period in early Korean history
