= Bronwyn Elsmore =

New Zealand writer and academic

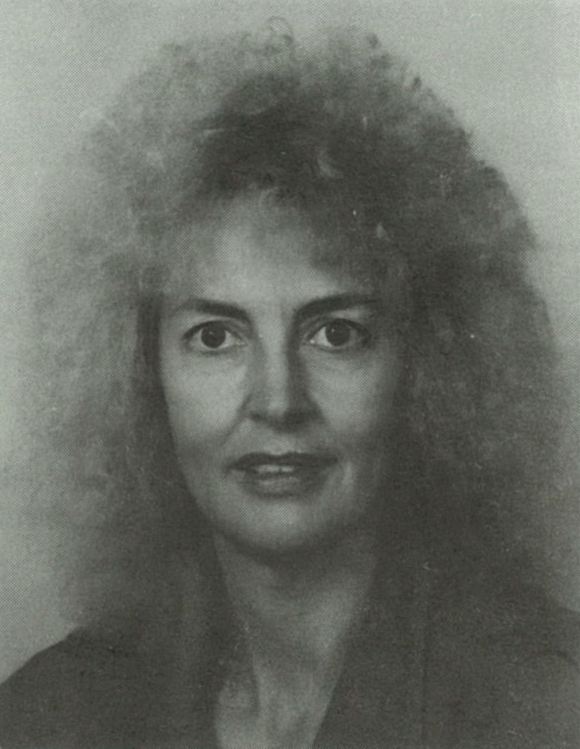
- Elsmore in 1989
- Born: Wairoa, New Zealand
- Occupations: Writer and senior lecturer

Academic background
- Education: Victoria University of Wellington (PhD)
- Thesis: According to the Scriptures: the influence of the publication of the Christian Scriptures in Maori on Maori religious movements (1986)

Academic work
- Discipline: Religious studies
- Institutions: Massey University (senior lecturer)
- Website: Official website

Bronwyn Margaret Elsmore is a New Zealand fiction and non-fiction writer and playwright. She was a senior lecturer in religion at Massey University from the late 1980s until 2005, and has written a number of works about religion in New Zealand.

== Life and career ==
Elsmore was born in Wairoa, Hawkes Bay. She has a PhD from Victoria University of Wellington. She has worked as a journalist for the Bay of Plenty Times and Radio New Zealand, and as a creative writing tutor. From the late 1980s until 2005 she was a senior lecturer in religious studies at Massey University.

She has written several non-fiction works about religion in New Zealand. Te Kohititanga Marama, about the prophet Te Matenga Tamati, was published in 1998; a review in The Southland Times described her as "one of the leading writers on Maori religion in New Zealand". Creedism: Religious Prejudice in New Zealand (1995) examined "the extent and the scope of religious intolerance in this country". Her work Like Them That Dream, about the impact of Christianity on early Maori society, was originally published in 1985 and republished in 2000 and 2011; the Waikato Times called it "a classic work in its own right".

Elsmore's short stories have been published in literary journals and magazines such as The New Zealand Listener, and her plays have been aired on radio. She writes for both adults and children. In 1997 she received an outstanding achievement award from the Playwrights Association of New Zealand (PANZ). Her play Fallout: The Sinking of the Rainbow Warrior (about the sinking of the Rainbow Warrior) was performed at The Basement Theatre in Auckland in 2015, directed by Jennifer Ward-Lealand. A review in The New Zealand Herald called it a "straight-talking, wonderfully-illustrated show", and "a hell of a tale for only $25".

She has been a judge for the New Zealand Book Awards and other literary competitions. She has been a writer for Playmarket since 1978, a member of the New Zealand Society of Authors (NZSA) since 1984, and a member of PANZ since 1979. In 2005 she participated in the Playmarket Auckland Playwrights Studio, and established the Auckland Playwrights Collective with other participants.

== Awards ==
Elsmore has received the following awards:

- Keith Henderson Award for Short Story, 1976
- The Phillips Cup for children's poetry, 1987
- PANZ playwriting competition award, for Drought, 1992
- PANZ playwriting competition award for Celestial Pursuits, 1997
- PANZ Doug Wrenn Award (now known as the Outstanding Achievement Award), 1997
- PANZ playwrighting competition award for Rushton Roulette, 1999
- International Writers Workshop short story award 2003
- NZSA Short Story Award 2010
- Franklin Writers Group short story award 2011
- Christine Cole Catley Short Story Award 2013 for "Dear Sir or Madam"
- PANZ playwriting competition, second place award for Cliché, 2014
- PANZ one-act playwriting competition, first place award for Reponui High Presents, 2022

== Selected works ==
=== Books ===
Elsmore's published non-fiction books include:

- Like Them That Dream – the Māori and the Old Testament (Tauranga Moana Press, 1985; Reed, 2000; Libro International, 2011)
- Creedism – Religious Prejudice in NZ (Nagare, 1995)
- Te Kohititanga Marama – New Moon, New World: The Religion of Matenga Tamati (Reed, 1998)
- Mana From Heaven – a century of Maori prophets in New Zealand (Reed, 1999)
- Religionz – A Guide to Religions in New Zealand (Reed, 2006)

Elsmore's published fiction works include:

- Every Five Minutes, novel (Flaxroots, 2012)
- Seventeen Seas, novel (Flaxroots, 2012)
- Backwards into the Future, novel (Flaxroots, 2015)
- These Islands Here – Short Stories of the South Pacific (Flaxroots, 2018)

=== Plays ===
Elsmore's plays for children and adults include:

- Drought (1992)
- Celestial Pursuits (1997)
- Rushton Roulette (1999)
- GoldiSnowErellaHood (2015)

=== Other works ===
Other works include:

- The Cats of Dipping Dell, children's picture book, (Golden Press, Sydney, 1979)
- Which Shoes to Choose?, children's picture book (Nelson-Price Milburn, 1989)
- "Baha'i Faith", essay in Religions of New Zealanders edited by Peter Donovan (Dunmore Press, 1997)
- Editor of Will Wandafar – Writings of Bernard Teague (Nagare, 2003)
- Editor of Southern Edge – New writers from Manukau Counties, Writer in Manukau Libraries (Manukau City, 2006)
