= Helen Moulder =

New Zealand actress

- Born: 22 August 1947 (age 78); Nelson, New Zealand
- Occupation: Actress
- Years active: 1974 – present

Helen Moulder (born 1947) is a New Zealand actress.

== Biography ==
Helen Moulder was born in Brightwater, Nelson, New Zealand in 1947. However she began her professional career in the UK in 1974, singing in musicals and pantomime and spending a year with the D'Oyly Carte Opera Company. In 1977 she returned to New Zealand where she has worked for several decades as an actor in theatre, television, film, and radio. In 2000 she won Actress of the Year in the Chapman Tripp Theatre Awards for her role as Vivian Bearing in the Circa Theatre production of Wit and did the same in 2003 for Sylvia in Meeting Karpovsky, a play she produced with Sir Jon Trimmer.

== Theatre ==
Recent theatre roles she has undertaken in New Zealand include the comic character of Cynthia Fortitude, which she developed along with Rose Beauchamp, who plays her long-suffering sidekick and accompanist Gertrude Rallentando, as part of their contributions to Hen's Teeth performances over several decades. Feature-length performances involving these characters include A Vote for Cynthia and The Legend Returns; the latter was developed from a Hen's Teeth sketch in 1997 and toured in New Zealand and San Francisco. She has also played Madam Giry in Ken Hill's Phantom of the Opera in Japan, and Virginia Woolf in Vita and Virginia.

She is represented by GCM (Gail Cowan Management Ltd).

== Filmography ==
Year	Title	Role	Notes
1981	Pictures	Lydia Burton	
1984	Out of Time		TV movie
1985	Dangerous Orphans	Madelaine	
1986	The Fire-Raiser	Mrs. Chalmers	
1986	Seekers	Judith	Episode: "The Apocalypse Is Now"
1987	Erebus: The Aftermath	Mrs. Maria Collins	TVNZ mini-series
1990	The Ray Bradbury Theater	Black's Mother	Episode: "Mars Is Heaven"
1992	Absent Without Leave	Ed's Aunt	
1992	The Ray Bradbury Theater	Mrs. Brabbam	Episode: "Great Wide World Over There"
1994	Rugged Gold	Doris	TV movie
1997	Aberration	Mrs. Miller	
1998	The Enid Blyton Secret Series	High Priest	Episode: "The Secret Mountain"
1999	Duggan	Jean Goodman	Episode: "Going Overboard"
2006	The Lost Children	Mrs. Brand	Episode: "1.5"
2010	Sweet As	Nana	Short film
2011	Rest for the Wicked	Margaret	Post-production
