= Playwrights Association of New Zealand =

Association in New Zealand

The Playwrights Association of New Zealand (PANZ) is an incorporated society in New Zealand. The association was founded in 1958. It awards an annual Outstanding Achievement Award, which from 1988 to 2016 was known as The Doug Wrenn Award. Doug Wrenn was a former president of PANZ. The award, instituted in 1988, is presented to "a member who had significant success in playwriting during the year".

== Award winners ==
Outstanding Achievement Award winners include:

2022: Tim Hambleton, "for community theatre productions of On the Right Track, Gone to Seed and Killer Boobs"

2021: Rex McGregor

2020: Lindsey Brown

2019: Alister Emerson

2018: Elspeth Tilley

2017: April Phillips

2016: Rex McGregor

2015: Rex McGregor

2014: Graeme Webber

2013: April Phillips

2012: Jennie Turner

2011: Neil Troost

2010: Angie Farrow

2009: Peter Franklin

2008: Leo Cappel

2007: Thomas Sainsbury

2006: Denis Edwards

2005: Diane Francis

2004: Richard Prevett

2003: Rosalie Carey

2002: Richard Prevett

2001: Alan Williamson

2000: Campbell Smith

1999: Jean Dinnie

1998: Brian Turner

1997: Bronwyn Elsmore

1996: Daphne Calderwood, Bruce Goodman, John Dunmore

1995: no award given

1994: Andre Surridge

1993: Denise Walsh

1992: Bruce Goodman

1991: Harrison Bray

1990: Campbell Smith

1989: Suzanne Le Prou

1988: Nancy Kinkel, Leslie Pearce
