= Jan Preston =

New Zealand musician

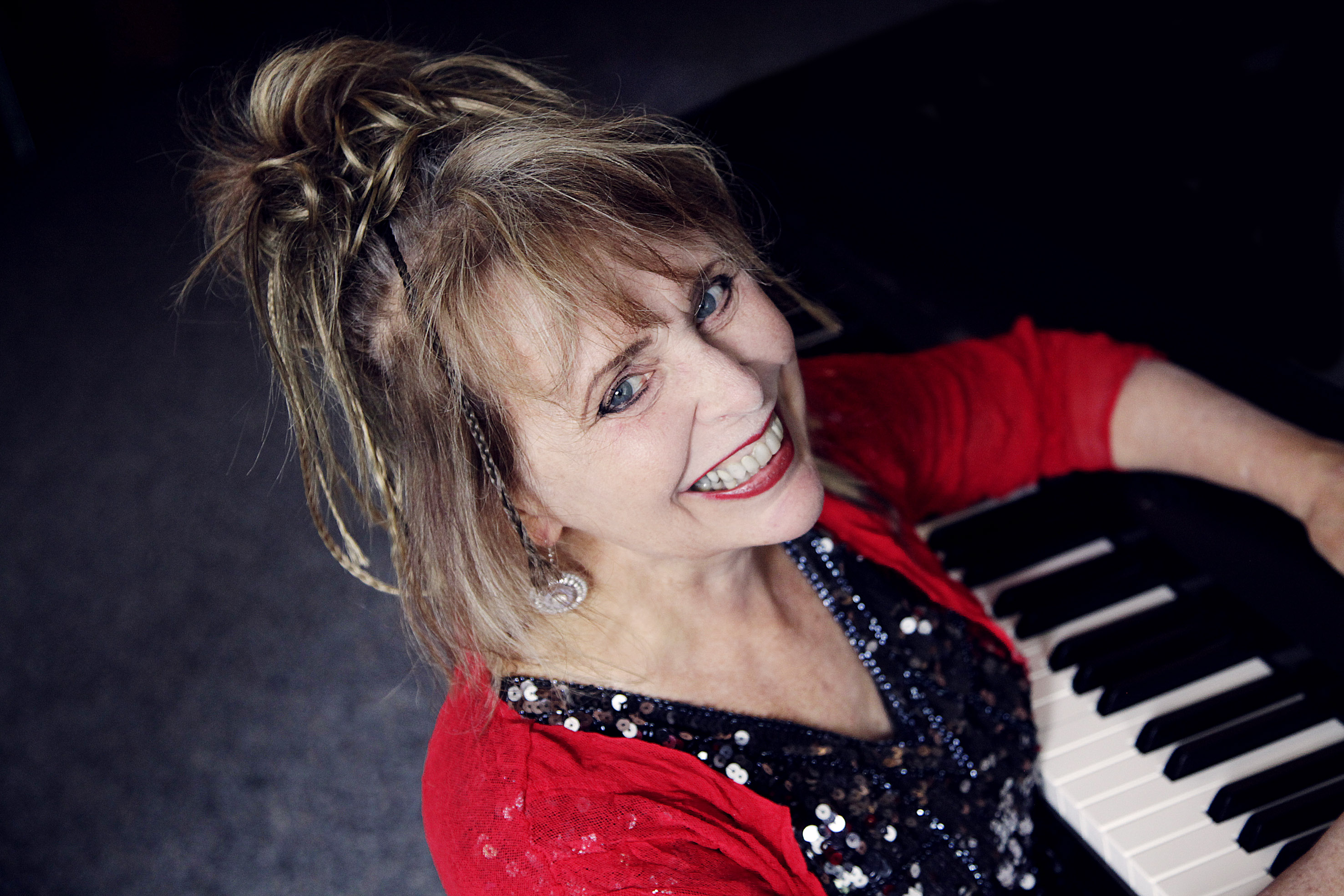
- Jan Preston in 2017

Background information
- Origin: New Zealand
- Genres: Boogie
- Occupations: Musician composer, songwriter
- Instrument: Piano
- Years active: 1979 - present

Jan Preston is a pianist, composer and songwriter, known as Australasia's Queen of Boogie Piano due to her mastery of the 1930s boogie-woogie piano style. Originally classically trained, she has released over ten solo albums, often featuring her boogie-woogie piano playing.

Preston has been a member of bands, including Midge Marsden's Country Flyers, Coup D'Etat (with Harry Lyon) and, in Australia, The Tribe. She sang lead vocals on the Coup D'Etat single No Music on my Radio.

She worked with theatre cooperative Red Mole, alongside their backing band Red Alert. Her work was documented by Sam Neill in the film Red Mole on the Road.

Preston has composed music for films such as Illustrious Energy, Home by Christmas and My Year with Helen, as well as music for 'hundreds of documentaries'. She collaborated with her sister, filmmaker and director Gaylene Preston to compose the scores for Gaylene's films Home By Christmas and My Year with Helen.

In 1988, she received the Best Music award at the New Zealand Listener Film and Television Awards for her score for Illustrious Energy.

In 2016, Jan Preston broke both of her wrists in an accident; once healed she continued to tour Australia and New Zealand with her band Jan Preston's Boogie Circus.
