= Magdalena Aotearoa =

New Zealand network of women in performance arts

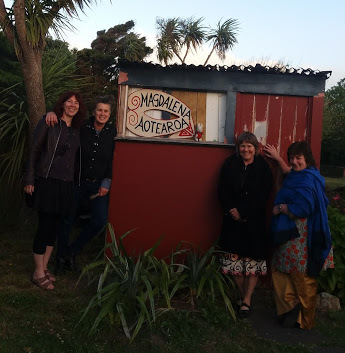
Magdalena Aotearoa Trust (2017)

Magdalena Aotearoa is a network of women in performing arts based in New Zealand (Aotearoa in Māori).

Founded in 1997 to encourage and promote women's ability to express their political and cultural realities through performing arts, it is a registered charitable trust. Soon after its founding, Magdalena Aotearoa organised a large international festival in 1999. Other activity is to host workshops, forums and international guests throughout New Zealand. Many participants from Magdalena Aotearoa events have gone on to attend related festivals and conferences in other countries that are all part of the original Magdalena Project, based in Wales.

== Background ==
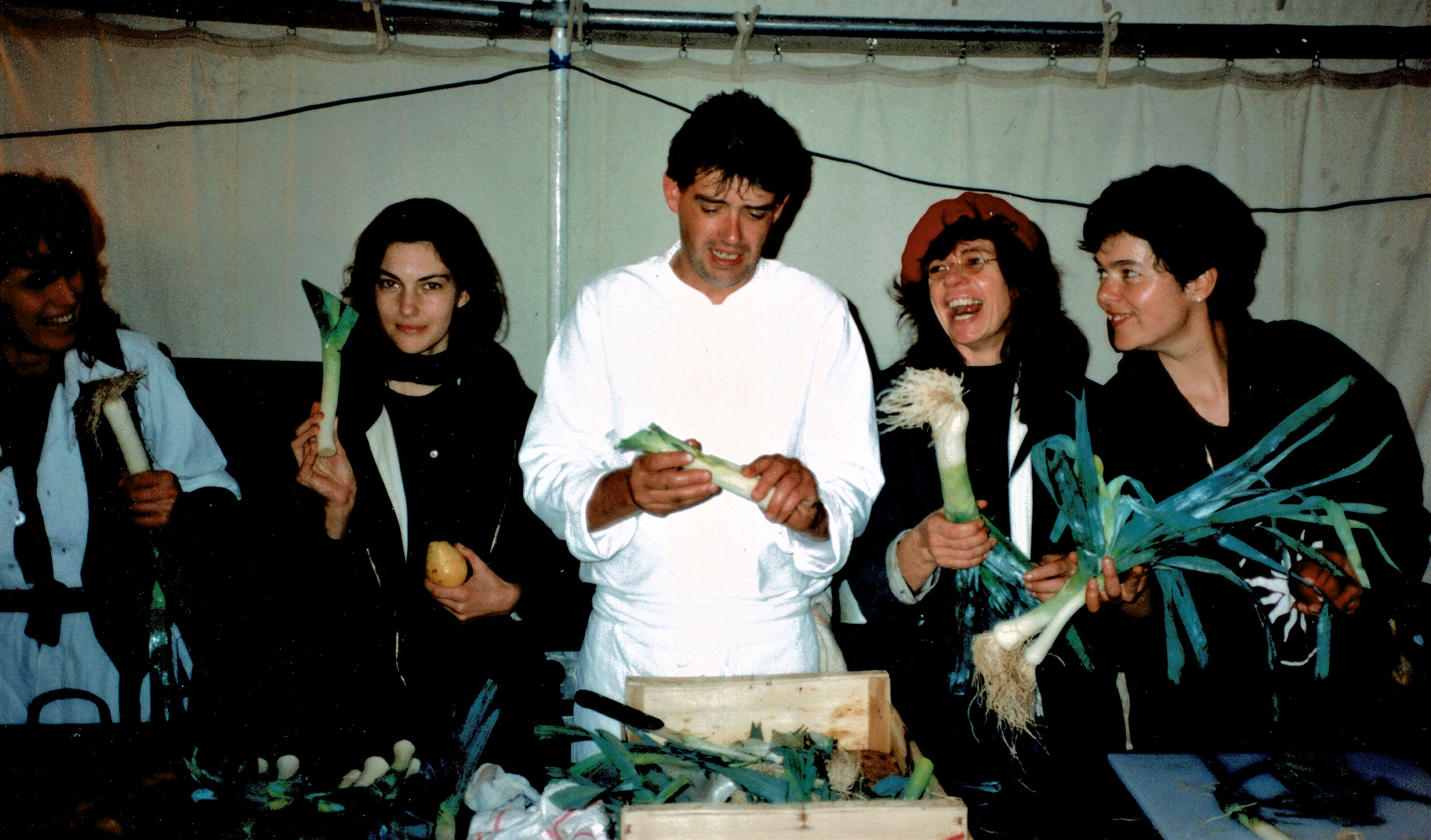
Rodwell and McNamara's company The Toad Lilies, with leeks and the chef at dinner at the Magdalena Project Festival in 1994, Cardiff, Wales. From the left: Madeline McNamara, Helen Johnston, the chef, Sally Rodwell, Robin Nathan.

Founding members Sally Rodwell and Madeline McNamara contacted the authors of Magdalena: International Women's Experimental Theatre, a book about a group of women in a creative theatre. This led to Rodwell and McNamara presenting their show Crow Station at the second Magdalena Project festival in 1994 in Cardiff, Wales. This began an enduring creative relationship between New Zealand theatre makers with many in this international network. In 1997, three years after attending the festival in Cardiff, Magdalena Project founder Jill Greenhalgh toured New Zealand and ran a series of workshops. Rodwell and McNamara formed the Magdalena Aotearoa charitable trust in the same year, with the intention of organising a Magdalena festival in New Zealand.

Rodwell and McNamara had a producing and creative partnership: in the 1990s they produced, along with Sue Dunlop and Gloria Hildred, three women's performance festivals called Not Broadcast Quality at Taki Rua Theatre in Wellington (1990, 1992, 1997). Many people from these performances became involved in Magdalena Aotearoa. A foundation principle in the network was to have a partnership between Māori and non-Māori embedded into the working practice.

The founding aims of the Magdalena Aotearoa Charitable Trust are:

- To encourage and promote the work on women in the performing arts;
- To create artistic, training and economic structures to enable women in theatre and related art forms to practise their craft;
- To encourage innovative individual and collaborative projects in the performing arts;
- To encourage the use of, respect for and knowledge of diverse theatrical forms and performance events expressing the political and cultural realities of the many different groups of women in Aotearoa;
- To set up a programme of workshops and performance events enabling more women to acquire the confidence and skills required for them to take the initiative and create work situations for themselves;
- To establish a network of artistic women both nationally and internationally;
- To be guided by the principals of the Treaty of Waitangi in promoting an active working partnership between Māori and tauiwi women in all of the Trust's work (the word 'tauiwi' denotes all those, other than Māori, who have settled in New Zealand)
- To host festivals that promote the above aims and to do any other act within Aotearoa that advances our charitable aims.

== 1999 International Festival, Wellington and Paekākāriki ==
The Magdalena Aotearoa International Festival of Women's Performance was held 21 March – 4 April 1999 and included performances of shows, workshops, installations, street events, music and cabaret, and an exhibition of fine art. The festival was structured into two sections: first a series of events across Wellington City, and second a shorter period in Paekākāriki, a village north of Wellington. The Paekākāriki section was curated and hosted by Magdalena Māori, a group of Māori women within Magdalena Aotearoa. In Wellington many of the events and performances were held at Circa Theatre on Wellington's waterfront.

In a review of the festival Adele Chynoweth highlighted why a women specific festival is valuable: "Separate events such as the Magdalena Festival provide relief from the mainstream global arts markets, thus allowing women to negotiate their own politics and representation of identity."

=== Programme of the 1999 Magdalena Aotearoa International Festival ===
The festival opened with a pōwhiri ceremony, and in the evening a free outdoor event held at Frank Kitts Lagoon called the Opening Spectacular. It was a big festival with many acts and parts to it. In Wellington city three theatre spaces were programmed, two at Circa Theatre, while Shed 11 (also on the Wellington waterfront) was converted into a theatre space. In addition there was an art exhibition in Shed 6, workshops, public lectures and street performances in the suburb of Newtown. In Paekākāriki the festival was located at a holiday park where a marquee created a concert venue alongside artist Debra Bustin's Tent of the Universe, where daily workshops were held by Māori tutors.

International acts and artists featured included:

- Ana Woolfe
- Mary Salem (Australia)
- Jill Greenhalgh (UK)
- Peggy Shaw and Lois Weaver - Split Britches (USA)
- Jolanta Krukowska (Poland)
- Dah Theatre
- Kirsten McIver
- Gilla Cremer
- Deborah Leiser
- Regina Heilman
- Julia Varley
- Teatret Om
- ARMAR
- Teatro La Mascara
- Geddy Aniksdal
- Stella Chiweshe
- Deborah Hunt
- Verena Tay (Singapore)

New Zealand acts and artists featured included:

- Emma Buttle & Jules Novena Sorrel
- France Herve (NZ and France)
- Ngā Tuahine
- Louse Maich
- all & sundry
- Dianna Fuemana
- Pacific Sisters
- Lilicherie McGregor & Olivia Lory Kay
- Roadworks
- Miff Moore
- Jo Randerson
- Storm Davenport & Anitta Alexander
- Tai Timu

== Activities ==
Between 1997 and 2015 a number of women theatre artists were brought to New Zealand for performances and workshops for artistic exchange.

- Geddy Aniksdal and Lars Vik (Norway), February–March 2015
- Violeta Luna (Mexico/USA), workshop and performance, June 2014
- Jadranka Andjelic (Serbia) and Antonella Diana (Italy/Denmark), July–August 2006
- Rosa Casado (Spain), June 2006
- Josefina Baez (USA/Dominican Republic), 2002 and 2004
- Birgitte Grimstad (Norway), 2002
- Teatro delle Radici (Switzerland), 2001 and 2005
- Jill Greenhalgh (Wales), 1997

Magdalena Aotearoa and the organisation Tii Kouka were represented at a Treaty of Waitangi conference called Treaty 2000. Madeline McNamara and Parekotuku Moore presented a performance and also a conference talk called Tino Rangatiratanga in the Performing Arts: The Story of Magdalena Aotearoa.

There was an annual event between 2007 and 2010, called a 'National Gathering' with workshops and work in progress showings.

In 2017 trustees Lisa Maule and Madeline McNamara presented a panel called The Magdalena Effect at the Women's Theatre Festival at Circa Theatre in Wellington. In 2018 and 2019 Magdalena Aotearoa facilitated the rewriting of a script about women in politics in New Zealand, supported by the Ministry of Women's Suffrage 125 Community Fund. The original script was called Women Like Us and the rewritten update was called The Fifty Percent Party.
