= April Phillips =

Writer, producer, singer living in New Zealand

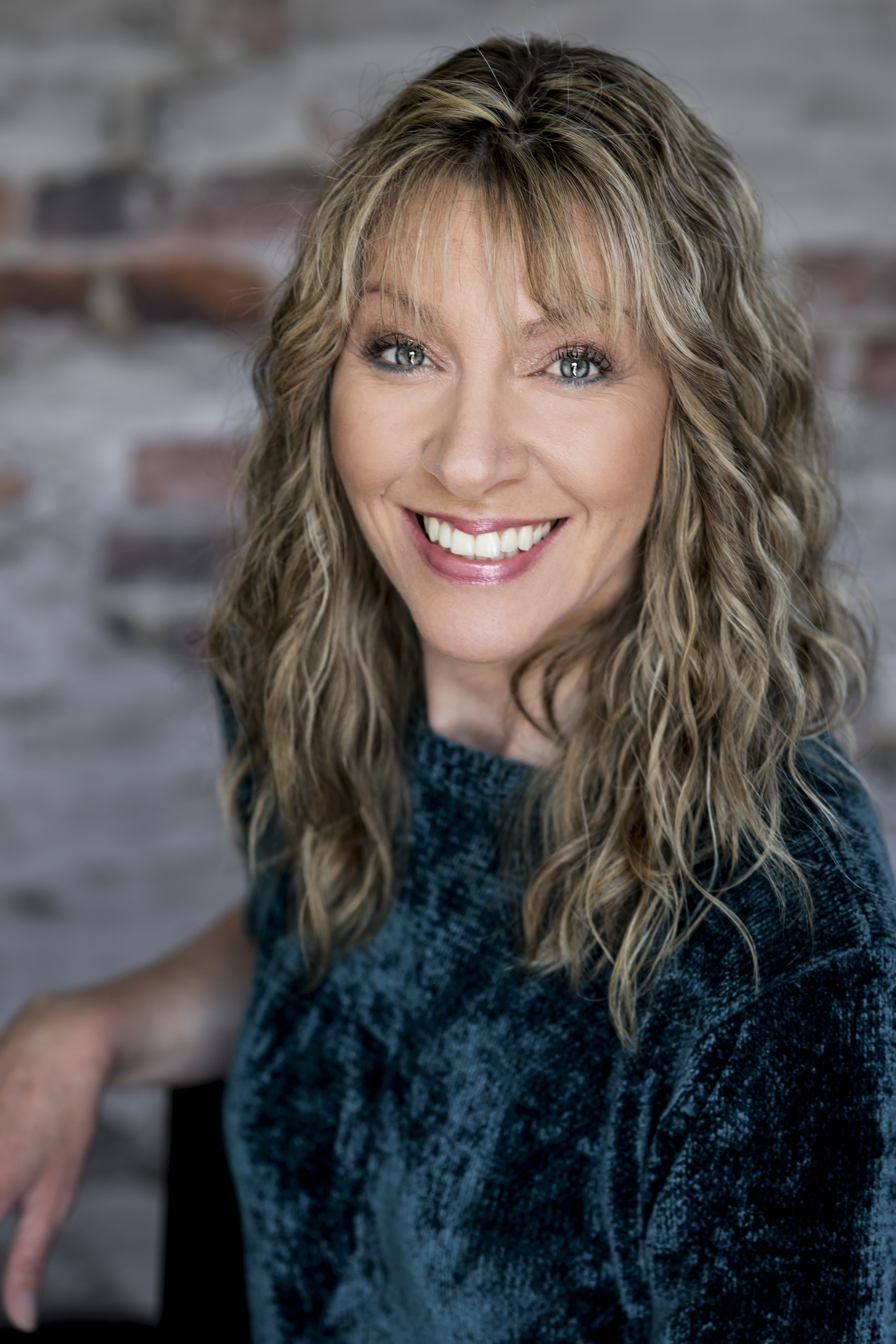
- Born: April Phillips; 1965 (age 60–61); Coventry, England
- Citizenship: New Zealand
- Education: Master's degree (Scriptwriting)
- Alma mater: Victoria University of Wellington
- Occupations: Actress, writer, singer, producer
- Agents: The Pro Actors (acting); Playmarket (scripts)
- Website: aprilphillips.com

April Phillips (born 1965) is an actress, writer, singer, director and producer of film and theatre. She was born in Coventry, England, but resides in Wellington, New Zealand. Her production company, Godiva Productions Limited, was named after the Lady Godiva legend of her hometown of Coventry.

== Writing ==
Phillips holds a master's degree in Scriptwriting from the International Institute of Modern Letters at Victoria University of Wellington. Her theatre works are represented internationally by Playmarket. and by David Spicer Productions in Australia. She is a member of the New Zealand Writers Guild and the Playwrights Association of New Zealand.

Phillips writes predominantly for theatre and film but has had two radio plays recorded by Radio New Zealand. Her most successful stage play, the modern farce "STiFF", has been produced internationally.

== Acting ==
Phillips is a stage and screen actress. She is represented by The Pro Actors. She has been a member of the acclaimed women's comedy troupe Hens' Teeth since 1995. She is a founding and current member of the stage sketch comedy show "Femme Natale" which has toured New Zealand and performed in the Edinburgh Fringe Festival 2023.

== Singing ==
Phillips is a professional and recorded singer. In addition to singing in various bands and at jazz festivals her TV appearances include multiple performances on Television New Zealand's "Good Morning" Show and "Breakfast Show" and the TV satirical series "McPhail and Gadsby" alongside Jon Gadsby and David McPhail. She released her debut jazz album in 2004 and has since donated 100% of her income from that album to Make A Wish New Zealand and donated over $12,000 to the charity. She recorded a follow up song called "What I'd Do For You" for Make A Wish New Zealand

Phillips also released an album of her own original pop songs called "Tempting Fate" and appears on a collaborative Nat King Cole tribute CD "Unforgettable".

Phillips performs with the bands "The Retro Pack", jazz and blues band "April's Fools", and disco duo "The Toffee Pops".

== Production ==
Phillips' production company, Godiva Productions Limited, has produced various musical stage shows including the jazz play Blue Eyes and the Nat King Cole tribute show Unforgettable. More recently she produced the musical shows The Glory of Gershwin for the 2016 Wellington Jazz Festival and The Retro Pack jazz revue at Wellington's Circa Theatre and at jazz festivals and clubs. In 2022, she was co-producer of the musical stage show "Let's Talk About Me!" which is now touring New Zealand. She was co-producer on the short films Utu Pihikete, Letter For Hope and The Odds and executive producer of the films "R.E.M." and "The Last Man on Earth". These films have received official selections at numerous US film festivals and won awards. She is a co-producer of the feature film "Blind Panic" which was released globally in 2025.

== Directing ==
Phillip's directorial debut was the award-winning sci-fi/horror short film REM which she also wrote and acted in. The film was officially selected for many international film festival screenings including "Fantasia", Montreal and "Horror Hound", Cincinnati, and notably at the 51st Worldfest, Houston where the film won a Platinum REMI award. Phillips's was nominated Best Director (Short Film) at the Ouchy Film Awards, Lausanne, Switzerland and Best Actress (Short Film) at the Madrid International Film Festival 2017. The film received 7 nominations at the Short Film Awards (S.O.F.I.E.S) in New York where Phillips won Best Director. Phillips short film "The Last Man on Earth" was completed in 2019 and was officially selected for Screamfest 2020, London Sci-Fi Film Festival, North Hollywood Film Festival and the 53rd Worldfest Houston where it received the Special Jury Award for Suspense/Thriller. Phillips earned an Honorable Mention as Director from the Los Angeles Film Awards (L.A.F.A) and Best Sci-Fi award, and Best Director at Festigious. The film was a finalist at the 2019 Flickers' Rhode Island International Film Festival. Phillips was awarded the Best Shorts 2020 annual Humanitarian Award - Outstanding Achievement - for the disability themes in her film. She was nominated for the Minerva Award at FilmQuest for her work as a female producer/director in genre filmmaking 2021. She is the co-director of the comedy drama feature film "1978" which had its world premiere in Beijing in June 2026.

== Filmography ==
Year	Title	Role	Other	Notes
2026	1978	Miss Dickens (Teacher)	Co-Writer/Co-Director/Casting	Feature Film
2025	Blind Panic		Co Producer/Script Consultant	Feature Film
2024	Powerswitch TVCs	Jen & Sue		TV Commercials
2024	The Crowning		Writer	Short Film
2022	Mako		Co-Writer/Acting Coach	Short Film
2021	Eels	Mother	Actress	Short Film
2021	The Odds		Writer/Co-Producer	Short Film
2020	Letting You Go	Mother	Actress	Music Video
2019	The Last Man on Earth	Prime Minister	Writer/Director/Executive Producer	Short Film
2017	Mortal Engines	Medic		Feature Film
2016	REM	Gail Morris	Writer/Director/Executive Producer	Short Film
2014	Girl vs. Boy Series 3	Carrie King		TV series
2014	Passion in Paradise	Mary King		TV series
2013	Utu Pihikete	Beth Brown	Writer/Co-producer	Short Film
2013	Letter For Hope	Jane	Writer/Co-producer	Short Film
2012	Mr Wilkins	Janice Hockney		Short Film
2011	Eternity	Cynthia Green		Feature Film
2009	The Lovely Bones (dir. Sir Peter Jackson)	Mother		Feature Film
2005	The Lost Children (Eps. 5 & 6)	Doris		TV series
2001	The Strip Ep 7 ("Assume The Position")	Miss Petit		TV series
1999	Duggan ("Moving House" Ep)	Rose Bergson		TV series
1998	First Impressions	Self and Various		TV series
1998	McPhail and Gadsby with Jon Gadsby and David McPhail	Core Cast		TV series
1997	McPhail and Gadsby with Jon Gadsby and David McPhail	Core Cast		TV series

== Awards ==
- 2023 New Zealand International Film Festival Letterboxd Audience Award for the film "Mako" (co-writer)
- 2021 FilmQuest Nominee for Minerva Award (female filmmaker in genre) - for the film "The Last Man on Earth"
- 2021 Top of the South Film Festival, New Zealand Best Film Aoteoroa for the film "The Haka" (co-writer)
- 2020 Best Shorts annual Humanitarian Awards - Outstanding Achievement Award - for the film "The Last Man on Earth"
- 2020 53rd Worldfest, Houston - for the film "The Last Man on Earth" - Special Jury Award Suspense/Thriller
- 2020 Festigious Film Awards - for the film "The Last Man on Earth" - Best Director, Best Original Story, Best Sci-Fi
- 2020 Independent Shorts Awards - annual awards - nominated Best Sci-Fi Film
- 2019 Los Angeles Film Awards (L.A.F.A.) - for the film "The Last Man on Earth" - Best Sci-Fi and Honorable Mention (Director)
- 2019 Independent Shorts Awards, L.A. - for the film "The Last Man on Earth" - Best Women Short (Gold), Best Supporting Actor (Gold), Best Director - Female (Silver), Best Sci-Fi Short (Silver), Best Original Story (Bronze) and Best Original Score (Bronze)
- 2017 Short Film Awards, New York (SOFIES) - Best Director for the film "REM"
- 2017 Short Film Awards, New York (SOFIES) - Nominated in Best Actress, Best Writing, Best Film and Best Director categories.
- 2017 Independent Spirit Award, Fantastic Planet Film Festival, Sydney
- 2017 Outstanding Achievement Award – Playwrights Association of NZ (PANZ)
- 2017 50th Worldfest, Houston – Platinum "REMI" Award for "REM"
- 2017 Fantastic Planet, Sydney – Independent Spirit Award for "REM"
- 2017 Madrid International Film Festival – Nomination for "Best Actress – Short" for "REM"
- 2017 Global Independent Film Awards – Bronze Medal for "REM"
- 2017 Finalist SWANZ Award for Best Unproduced Screenplay for "Blind Eye"
- 2016 IndieFest Film Awards Award of Excellence Special Mention "REM"
- 2016 Ouchy Film Festival Lausanne selection and nominated Best Director "REM"
- 2016 Hollywood Boulevard Film Festival Best Foreign Short for "REM"
- 2016 Los Angeles Independent Film Festival Awards Best Horror Short Foreign and Best Sound Design for "REM"
- 2016 Global Accolade Film Competition Award of Merit Special Mention for "REM"
- 2016 Best Shorts Film Competition Award for Excellence for the film "REM"
- 2015 Best Shorts Film Competition Award for Excellence for the film Utu Pihikete
- 2014 Global Accolade Film Competition Awards for Excellence for the films "Letter For Hope" and "Utu Pihikete"
- 2014 Action on Film Festival for the films "Letter For Hope" and "Utu Pihikete"
- 2014 IndieFest Film Festival for the films "Letter For Hope" and "Utu Pihikete"
- 2013 Doug Wrenn Award for Achievement
- 2013 Finalist in SWANZ Awards Best Play category for "Motel"
- 2013 Winner New Zealand Writer’s Guild 5 Page Film Treatment competition for "As Seen on TV"
- 2012 Finalist in SWANZ Awards Best Play category for "SNiP"
- 2010 Michael Hirschfeld Scholarship for Scriptwriting (Victoria University of Wellington)
- 2010 Playwrights Association of NZ (PANZ) One Act Play for "Bonking James Bond"
- 2010 Radio New Zealand Drama Student Short for the radio play "In Two Minds"
- 2003 Playwrights Association of NZ (PANZ) Playwriting Competition for "STiFF"
- 2003 Stellar Award for "Best Music Production" for "Blue Eyes"
- 2002 Adam Play Reading Series – Downstage Theatre for "STiFF"
- 1996 Chapman Tripp Theatre Awards – "Hens' Teeth Women's Comedy Company" – Best Female Comedy

== Plays ==
- Perfect - a drama with disability themes which has been produced for the Short + Sweet theatre festivals in Sydney, Hollywood and Mexico.
- Let's Talk About Me! - musical comedy first produced by LTAM Partnership at Te Raukura Ki Kapiti Theatre, Paraparaumu, New Zealand in September 2022
- Swingers - a comedy first produced by CAS'n'OVA Productions, Christchurch, New Zealand 2018
- "Motel" – a contemporary drama first produced by CAS'n'OVA Productions, Christchurch, New Zealand 2013
- "STiFF" – a modern farce first produced by Playbox Theatre, Hamilton, New Zealand 2002
- "Death & Taxe$" – comedy first produced by 16th Avenue Theatre, Tauranga, New Zealand 2010
- "Bonking James Bond" – One act comedy first produced by CAS'n'OVA Productions, Christchurch, New Zealand 2012
- "Snip" – One act comedy first produced by CAS'n'OVA Productions, Christchurch, New Zealand 2012
- "Blind Eye" – a contemporary drama first produced by CAS'n'OVA Productions, Christchurch, New Zealand
- "Blue Eyes" – musical play first produced at Circa Theatre 2004, winner of the Stellar Award for Best Musical Production, Fringe Festival
- "Killing Me Softly" – a contemporary drama first produced at Taki Rua Theatre, Wellington, New Zealand 1996
- "Instinct" – One act drama first produced by Elmwood Players, New Zealand 2015

== The Prince Edward ==
In 1983, at the age of 17, Phillips was the focus of intense international media interest when she appeared in a stage production of the play Charley's Aunt opposite Prince Edward at the prestigious Wanganui Collegiate School. The Prince was a tutor at the school for two terms during his gap year. The media speculated about a romance between the pair but Phillips has always maintained that they are just friends.
