= Angie Farrow =

New Zealand playwright and academic

Angie Farrow ONZM
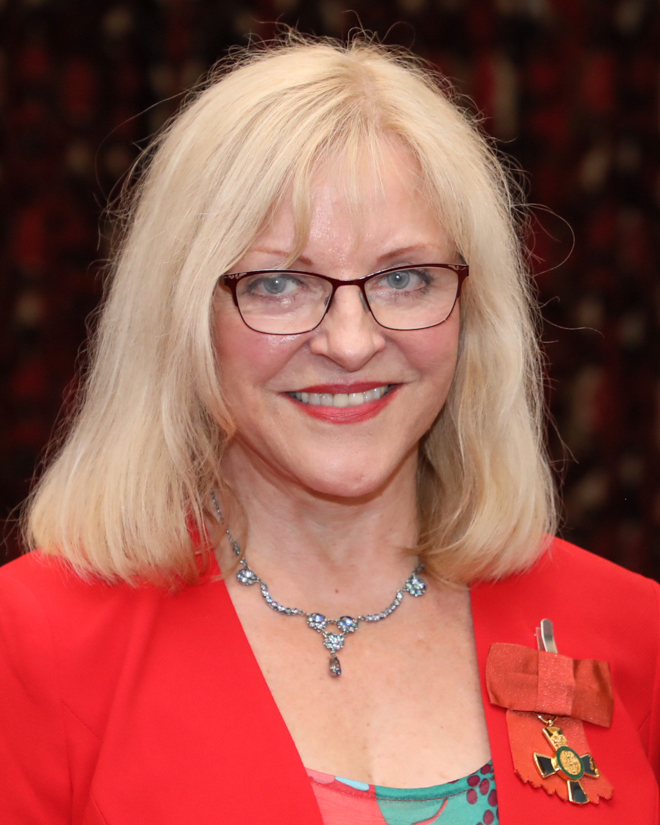
- Farrow in 2021
- Born: 1951 (age 74–75)

Academic background
- Education: University of Exeter
- Thesis: The writing of a community theatre play for the Manawatu (2000)

Academic work
- Discipline: Theatre
- Institutions: Massey University
- Website: Massey profile

Angela Rosina Farrow ONZM (born 1951) is a New Zealand academic and writer for theatre and radio. Born in the United Kingdom, Farrow was appointed professor emerita at Massey University in November 2022. She was promoted to full professor in 2011 and in the same year was awarded Massey University lecturer of the Year. Farrow has published books on the production of physical theatre as well as her own numerous plays for theatre and radio. In April 2015, her series of 10-minute-long sketches Together All Alone was performed at Bats Theatre in Wellington. In the 2021 New Year Honours, Farrow was appointed an Officer of the New Zealand Order of Merit, for services to the arts, particularly theatre.

== Awards ==
- The Pen is a Mighty Sword International Playwriting Competition, USA, 2007
- Doug Wrenn Award for Outstanding Contribution to NZ Playwriting
- Globe Theatre Award for ‘Best New New Zealand Play’
- Best Drama Script at the Auckland Short and Sweet Festival
- Winner of Inspirato Playwriting Award, Canada
- Best Wild Card at the Sydney Short and Sweet Festival
- People's Choice Winner at the Inspirato Festival, Canada
- People's Choice Award for Falling in Melbourne Short and Sweet Festival, Melbourne
- First Prize in The Three Leeches Playwriting Contest for Lifetime, USA
- Best Script for Lifetime at the Singapore Short and Sweet Festival

== Publications ==
- Plays for Physical Theatre: Three plays for young adults with notes for their production
- Plays for Physical Theatre II

== Plays ==
- Falling
- Despatch
- New Zealand Lamb
- Goodbye April
- Happiness
- Last Breath
- Leo Rising
- Lifetime
- Nearly There
- Replay
- Tango Partner
- Speed of Light
- Follow Follow Follow
- Before The Birds
- Amnesia
- August Moon
- the river
