= Should I Be Good? =

- Directed by: Grahame McLean
- Written by: Grahame McLean
- Produced by: Grahame McLean
- Starring: Harry Lyon; Joanne Mildenhall; Hammond Gamble
- Cinematography: Warrick Attewell
- Edited by: Jamie Selkirk
- Music by: Geoff Castle
- Release date: May 13, 1985
- Running time: 107 min
- Country: New Zealand
- Language: English

Should I Be Good? is a 1985 New Zealand film. Loosely based around the true story of Mr Asia, a musician is looking for his partner who has become a addicted drug mule. It was filmed in 1984 back to back with Lie of the Land, rushed into production before changes to government funding policies.

Hammond Gamble and Beaver's rendition of "Should I Be Good Or Should I Be Evil?" from the soundtrack won the 1985 New Zealand Music Award for best film soundtrack.

== Cast ==
- Harry Lyon as Nat Goodman
- Joanne Mildenhall as Vicki Strassbourg
- Hammond Gamble as Ed Patterson
- Beaver as Julie Patterson
- Spring Rees as Anne-Marie Carre
- Terence Cooper as Frank Lauber
- Robin Dene as Robert Appleby
- Simon O'Connor as Michael Elworthy
- Johnny Chico as Chico
- Christine Higgs as Caroline Prendergast
- Gilbert Goldie as Alan Galloway
- Bruce Allpress as Neville Oswald

== Reception ==
Helen Martin in New Zealand film, 1912-1996 says "All the actors are hampered by lack of a coherent script and are obviously making it up as they go along. Gaping plot holes, non sequiturs and awkward filler scenes give the whole thing a stuck together look. There is no centre to the narrative and there are far too many characters. Just when the story seems to be going somewhere it lurches off in another direction." Variety reviewer Mike Nicolaidi wrote "The low budget shows in the quality of the print. Great lurches are evident in the plotline, and in character motivation." He adds "Lyon, a singer in real life, brings a certain shy, rugged charm to Nat Goodman. Among the femmes, Beaver, in a small support role, is the standout."
