= Lie of the Land (film) =

- Directed by: Grahame McLean
- Written by: Grahame McLean; Kevin Smith
- Produced by: Grahame McLean: Narelle Barsby
- Starring: Roberta Wallach; Marshall Napier; Terence Cooper
- Cinematography: Warrick Attewell
- Edited by: Jamie Selkirk
- Music by: Dale Gold
- Release date: May 12, 1985
- Running time: 91 min
- Country: New Zealand
- Language: English

Lie of the Land is a 1985 New Zealand film created by Grahame McLean. It was filmed in 1984 back to back with Should I Be Good?, rushed into production before changes to government funding policies.

In the 1920s a former soldier helps a widow keep her land from a land baron. The property also has a makutu (Maori curse) on it.

== Cast ==
- Roberta Wallach as Alwyn Lewis
- Marshall Napier as Major Martin Hudson
- Terence Cooper as Clifford
- Jonathan Hardy as Doctor Max Steiner
- Dean Moriarty as Henry
- Jim Moriarty as George Thompson / George's brother
- Ann Pacey as Jenna

== Reception ==
Helen Martin in New Zealand film, 1912-1996 says "Big problems with the script are that much of the 'mystery' is explained in dialogue or flashback and plot holes and non sequiturs make for confusion and bathos." Variety wrote "For much of the time , it seems not sure whether to take its subject seriously (albeit with humor) or send it up totally."
