= Roberta Wallach =

American actress

- Born: 1955 or 1956 (age 70–71)
- Occupation: Actress
- Years active: 1972–

Roberta Wallach is an American actress of stage, screen, and television. She was the daughter of Eli Wallach and Anne Jackson. She made her professional film debut at age sixteen. She starred in The Effect of Gamma Rays on Man-in-the-Moon Marigolds and Lie of the Land and featured in Family Reunion along with multiple other famous children of actors. She featured in the TV movie The Land of Hope which was a pilot that was not picked up.

On stage she has appeared alongside her parents in Down the Garden Path (Minetta Lane Theatre, 2000) and The Diary of Anne Frank (Young People's Theatre, 1978). Other featured stage roles include The Model Apartment (La Jolla Playhouse, 1997).
