= Rosalie Carey =

New Zealand actor, playwright, director and author

Rosalie Carey MNZM
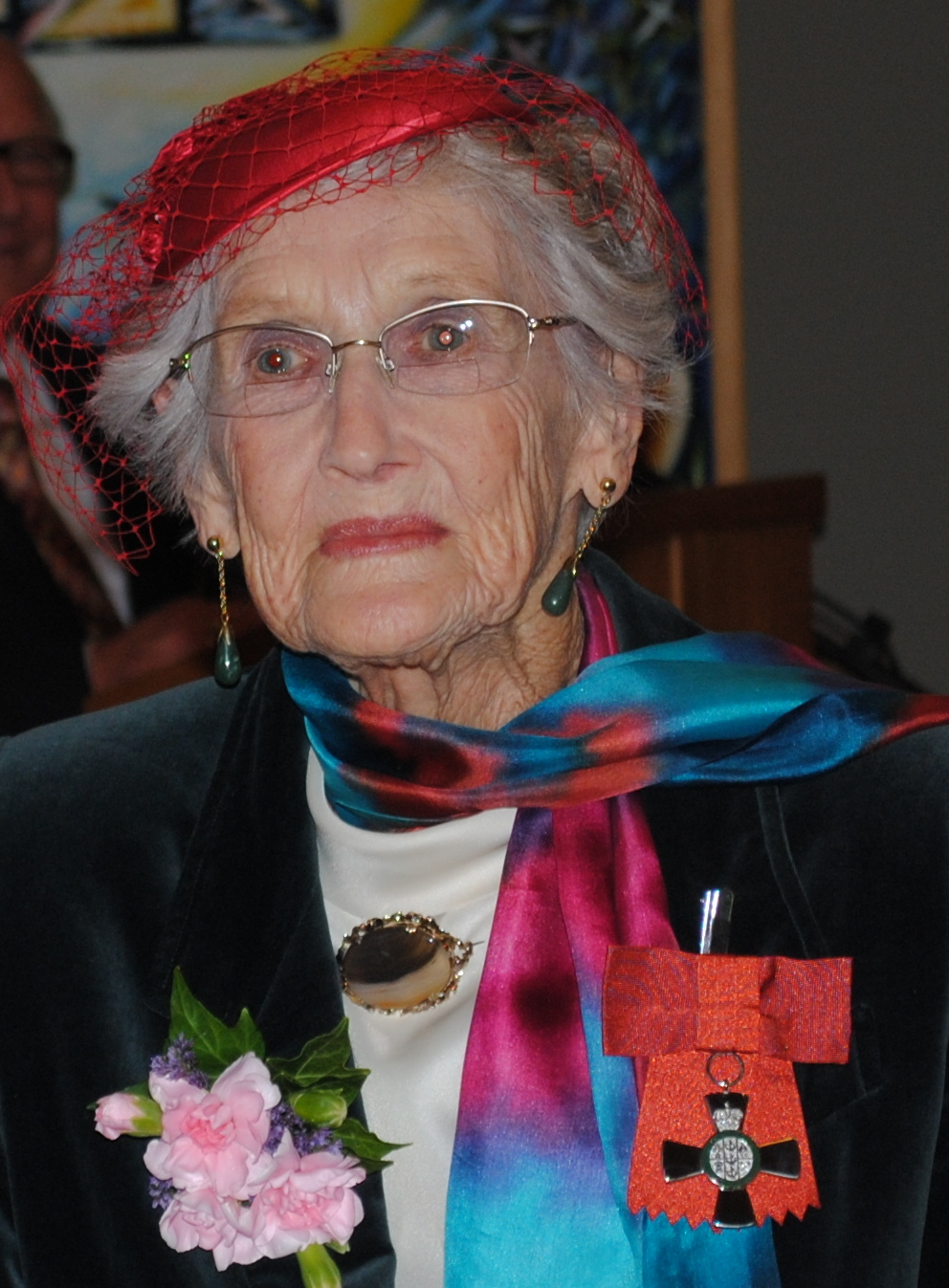
- Carey in 2010
- Born: Rosalie Louise Seddon; 18 May 1921; New Zealand
- Died: 29 June 2011 (aged 90); Whangārei, New Zealand
- Education: Guildhall School of Music and Drama
- Occupation(s): Playwright, director, poet, actor, author
- Known for: Founding the Globe Theatre, Dunedin
- Spouse: Patric Carey (m. 1953; div. 1982)

Rosalie Louise Carey MNZM (née Seddon; 18 May 1921 – 29 June 2011) was a New Zealand actor, playwright, director and author who founded the Globe Theatre in Dunedin, the first purpose-built theatre for professional repertory in New Zealand, with then-husband Patric Carey. In 2010 Carey was appointed a Member of the New Zealand Order of Merit for services to the theatre. The New Zealand Society of Authors made Carey an honorary life member.

== Early life ==
Carey was born on 18 May 1921 to parents Ada Yvonne Rica Seddon and Richard Stephen Rowley Seddon.

Carey was brought up in Lumsden and Hamilton, and planned to study theatre and acting in England but had to change her plans after the outbreak of World War II. She was an elocution and voice production teacher in Waikato, before joining the New Zealand Women's Auxiliary Air Force. She adapted two novels which were performed in Hamilton, and wrote and played the lead part in Amy Robsart, performed in 1940, receiving particular attention for her costuming and for using a suit worn by Sir Henry Irving for the leading man. Carey's older sister Audrey Seddon studied commercial art in London, and provided two posters for advertising the play.

== England ==
After the war, Carey travelled to England, where she studied at the Guildhall School of Music and Drama in London, and worked in repertory and provincial theatre, including with the Adelphi Guild Theatre. Carey met Patric Carey, an Irish theatre designer, in Cornwall and they were married at the church in Gulval before travelling to New Zealand in 1953.

== Return to New Zealand ==
On their return, the Careys initially settled in Wellington, and Carey joined the New Zealand Players, a touring professional theatre company. At that time in New Zealand there was no other professional theatre. When the Dunedin Repertory Society offered Patric Carey the position of director, the couple moved south, and purchased a large wooden house at 104 London Street in Dunedin. The house had been built by architect William Mason as his personal residence, however prior to their purchase it had changed hands several times, most recently having been rented out, and was in a deteriorated condition. The Careys staged plays in the garden and drawing room.

== The Globe ==
The Careys decided to extend the house into a theatre, digging the foundations in 1957. The extension, designed by Niel Mason, included a domed ceiling, and a stage with no proscenium arch. It was built by volunteers and Patric Carey, with the oversight of engineer Ben Elson. The Globe was the first purpose-built theatre for professional repertory in New Zealand.

== Later life ==
Patric Carey retired to Mahinerangi some years after the theatre was sold to the Friends in 1971, and the Careys dissolved their marriage in 1982. Patric Carey died in 2006.

Carey was a member of the Whangarei Writers Workshop, the Playwrights Association of New Zealand, and wrote several books, including A Theatre in the House: The Careys' Globe, poetry, a children's book, and a memoir It's Not What You Know. She was an honorary life member of the New Zealand Society of Authors. Carey was awarded the Playwrights Association of New Zealand Outstanding Achievement Award in 2016.

Carey was appointed a Member of the New Zealand Order of Merit, for services to the theatre, in the 2010 New Year Honours. She died in Whangārei on 29 June 2011.

== Selected publications ==
- Rosalie Carey (1999). A Theatre in the House: The Careys' Globe. Dunedin: Otago University Press. ISBN 1-877133-66-3. OCLC 42920246. OL 6854103M. Wikidata Q106816634.
- Rosalie Carey; Earl of Seacliff Art Workshop (2007). Autumn leaves. ISBN 978-1-86942-085-7. OCLC 145082104. Wikidata Q106838029.
- Rosalie Carey (2007). It's not what you know. ISBN 978-1-877338-98-4. OCLC 156767492. OL 16802234M. Wikidata Q106838019.
- Rosalie Carey; Ruth Kiel (1989). The tolliwoffle. ISBN 978-0-7055-1464-4. OCLC 154141386. Wikidata Q106838023.
