= Terence Cooper =

British actor (1933–1997)

- in Casino Royale (1967)
- Born: 5 July 1933; Carnmoney, County Antrim, Northern Ireland
- Died: 16 September 1997 (aged 64); Cairns, Queensland, Australia
- Other names: Terrance Cooper; Terrence Cooper
- Occupation: Actor
- Years active: 1955–1997

Terence Cooper (5 July 1933 – 16 September 1997) was a British film actor, best known for his roles in Australian and New Zealand television and film.

== Biography ==
Born in 1933 at Carnmoney, a district of the modern-day borough of Newtownabbey in Northern Ireland, he became a stage actor and appeared in ITC British television series such as The Buccaneers and The Adventures of William Tell.

Cooper is known for appearing in the 1967 film, Casino Royale, a James Bond satire based on Ian Fleming's first Bond novel of the same name. Producer Charles K. Feldman kept him on a contract for two years before the film was made.

In New Zealand he appeared in a number of New Zealand TV series such as Hunter's Gold (1977), an episode of Ngaio Marsh Theatre (1977), Gather Your Dreams (1978), Children of Fire Mountain (1979), Jack Holborn (1982) and Mortimer's Patch (1982). He played the part of Sir Arthur Conan Doyle's bombastic character 'Professor George Edward Challenger' in a 1982 New Zealand radio dramatisation of Doyle's novel "The Lost World" (produced by Peggy Wells and Barry Campbell).

In Australia, he appeared in guest roles in local drama series including Homicide, Division 4, Matlock Police, and Rafferty's Rules, with a regular role as Inspector Leo Vincetti in Bony (1992).

He was also a water colour artist. He retired in Far North Queensland, Australia where he painted a collection of water colours depicting Australian tropical rain forests and birdlife.

Perhaps one of Cooper's lesser known achievements was his 1982 publication, Trouper Cooper's Curry Cookbook (William Collins Publishers, Auckland 1982). At the time, Cooper ran a successful curry restaurant in Auckland, New Zealand, Trouper Cooper's Curry House. He also wrote The Parnell Cookbook.

He died in Cairns in September 1997 at the age of 64.

== Partial filmography ==
- The Square Peg (1958) – Paratrooper (uncredited)
- Oh... Rosalinda!! (1955) – Gentleman
- Top Floor Girl (1959) – (uncredited)
- No Safety Ahead (1959) – (uncredited)
- Calculated Risk (1963) – Nodge
- Man in the Middle (1964) – Maj. Clement
- Walk a Tightrope (1964) – Jason Shepperd
- Casino Royale (1967) – Cooper (James Bond 007)
- Gather Your Dreams (1978) - Wallace Carter
- Radio Waves (1978) - Rex Latimer
- The Park Terrace Murder (1976) - Mr. Cotter
- Beyond Reasonable Doubt (1980) – Paul Temin
- Jack Holborn (1982) – Morris
- Trespasses (1984) – Doug Mortimer
- Heart of the Stag (1984) – Robert Jackson
- Pallet on the Floor (1984) – Brendon O'Keefe
- Should I Be Good? (1985) – Frank Lauber
- Sylvia (1985) – Inspector Bletcher
- Kingpin (1985) – Dave Adams
- Hot Target (1985) – Carmichael
- Lie of the Land (1985) – Clifford
- Hot Pursuit (1987) – Captain Andrew
- No Way Out (1987) – N.Z. Ambassador
- Defense Play (1988) – Professor Vandemeer
- The Shrimp on the Barbie (1990) – Sir Ian Hobart
- The Grasscutter (1990) – Jack Macready
- Old Scores (1991) – Eric Hogg
- Fatal Past (1994) – David Preston
- Hell's Belles (1995) – (final film role)
