= Alan Brunton =

New Zealand poet and playwright (1946–2002)

Alan Mervyn Brunton (14 October 1946 – 27 June 2002) was a New Zealand poet and playwright.

== Biography ==
Brunton was born in Christchurch and educated at Hamilton Boys' High School, the University of Auckland and Victoria University of Wellington. He was founding editor of Freed, and in 1970 Brunton moved to Europe and Asia, publishing Messengers in Blackface (1973, London). From 1974 to 1978 he co-founded an experimental theatre group, Red Mole with his partner Sally Rodwell. He co-edited Spleen 1976–77. He lived his latter years at Island Bay, a suburb of Wellington. He died in Amsterdam in 2002 during a visit to Europe.

== Works ==
Alan Brunton's work was interwoven between his poetry and theatre. He performed as part of the troupe in Red Mole in many venues including in the 1970s Carmen's Balcony in Wellington, New Zealand. Carmen's Balcony was a notorious nightclub run by Carmen Rupe. His colleague Arthur Baysting was performing there too and says of his work: "Alan’s political eye could be sharp and droll: “the vaudeville king of politics is calling names again on the radio … how much gin does He drink in a day?” (Sally’s Turn to Talk). On a good night, in the face of drunken calls for the live rock band or topless dancers, he could silence the packed crowds with a tender, softly spoken love song."

- Black & White Anthology (1976). A 33-part sequence with an Asian setting
- Oh Ravachol (1978). Red Mole
- And She Said (1984). Red Mole
- New Order (1986). Red Mole
- Red Mole, a Sketchbook. ISBN/SKU: 9780864730930
- Beyond the Oh La La Mountains (2014). Poems 1968–2002. Titus Books. 2014
- Ecstasy (2001). A collection of poems for the new millennium. Bumper Books. ISBN 0-9582225-1-7

Brunton has also edited and co-edited a number of publications.
