= The Drongos =

The Drongos were a quartet of New Zealanders that performed from 1979 to 1986 primarily in New York City.

They originated from Wellington, where, as Red Alert, they were the backing band of the theatrical troupe Red Mole. They were notable for their successful "busking" performances on busy Manhattan street corners and also played the legendary CBGB. The New York Times called their eponymous first album "a delightful melange of funk rhythms, country harmonies, precisely layered electric guitar counterpoint and airy folk-rock sounds, with many influences, old and new, absorbed into a delightfully original sound."

== Members ==
The Drongos all moved to New York from New Zealand in 1978: They were managed by Martha Moran and Mike Shatzkin

- Tony McMaster
- Jean McAllister
- Stan Mitchell
- Richard Kennedy

=== Albums ===
- The Drongos Proteus Records (1984)
- Small Miracles Proteus Records (1985)
