= Jan Bolwell =

New Zealand playwright, choreographer and dance teacher

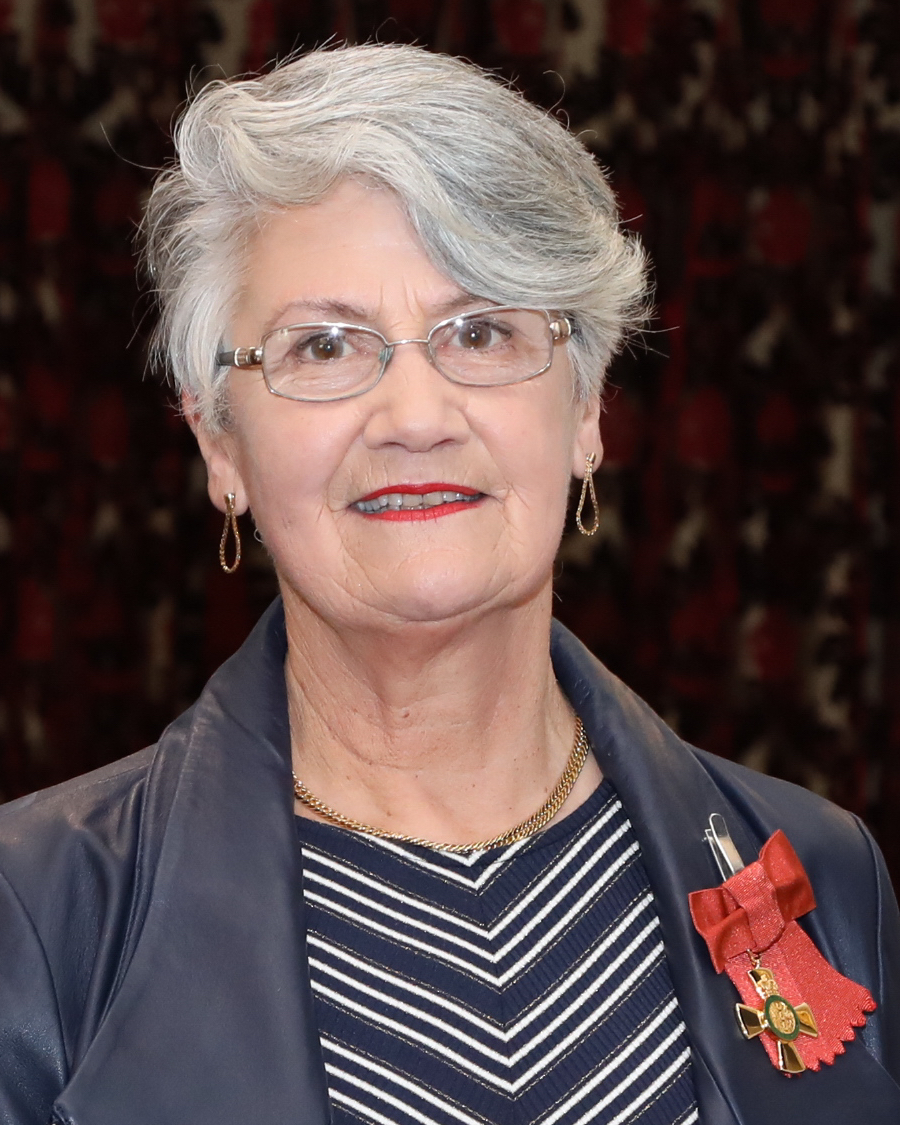
- in 2020
- Born: 1949 (age 76–77); Oamaru
- Education: Columba College and the University of Otago
- Occupation: academic
- Employer: Dunedin College of Education then Wellington College of Education
- Known for: dance and theatre

Jan Patricia Bolwell ONZM (born 1949) is a Wellington-based New Zealand playwright, choreographer, director, dancer and teacher of dance. She established the Crows Feet Dance Collective in 1999 and remains its director.

== Biography ==
Bolwell was born on the South Island in Oamaru but grew up in Dunedin where she was educated at Columba College. She then completed a Bachelor of Arts at the University of Otago, majoring in history.

Having set up and run the dance curriculum for the Dunedin College of Education she was promoted to senior lecturer, before moving to the Wellington College of Education as head of performing arts from 1987 to 1997.

In 2018 she directed Kate JasonSmith in I'll Tell You This For Nothing: My mother the war hero, a play written by JasonSmith about her mother's experiences in World War II, performed at BATS Theatre in Wellington.

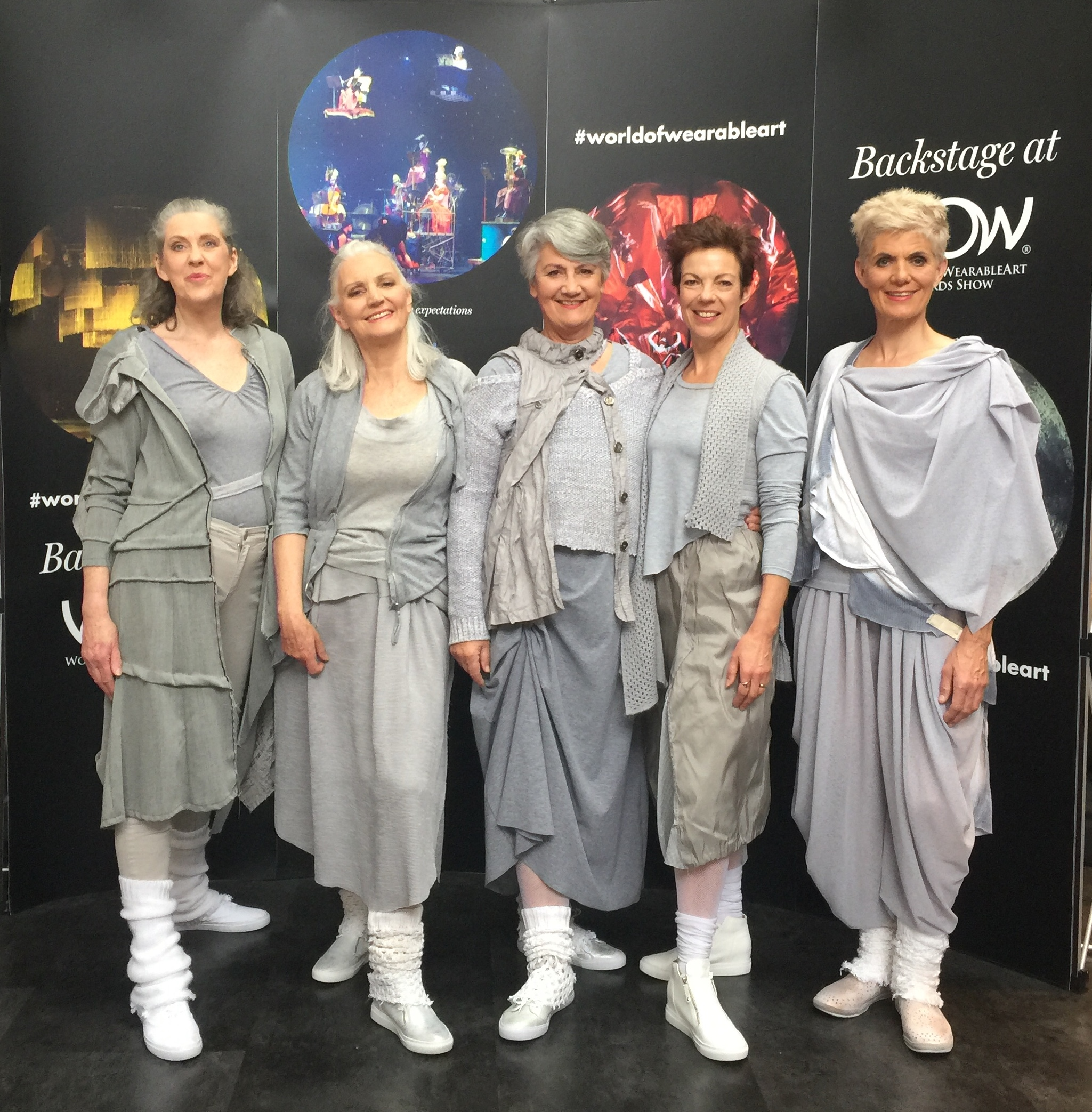
Crows Feet dancers - Jan Bolwell, Helen Balfour, Meg Bailey, Jenny Cossey and Trish Stevenson in WOW (2019)

== Awards and recognition ==
In 1995, with Sunny Amey and Keri Kaa, she won Production of the Year in the Chapman Tripp Theatre Awards for Takitoru.

Bolwell was appointed an Officer of the New Zealand Order of Merit for "service to dance and theatre" in the 2020 New Years Honours.

== Plays ==
- Standing on My Hands
- Here's Hilda! – writer and performer, 2007
- Double Portrait: Finding Frances Hodgkins – writer, first performed 2009
- Dancing In The Wake: The Story of Lucia Joyce – writer, first performed 2012

== Published work ==
- Milord Goffredo (2002) - Published by Steele Roberts, Wellington, NZ, ISBN 187722863X (pbk.)
- A pretty piece of driving : Hilda Gardiner, my grandmother (2005) - Published by Steele Roberts, Wellington, NZ, ISBN 9781877338816
