= Te Matenga Tamati =

Te Matenga Tamati, or Hia (1835-9?–1914?), was a notable New Zealand religious leader, prophet and healer. Of Māori descent, he identified with the Ngati Kahungunu and Ngati Rongomaiwahine iwi.
