= Bub Bridger =

New Zealand writer and performer

Bub Bridger MNZM
- Born: 15 July 1924; Napier, New Zealand
- Died: 8 December 2009 (aged 85); Granity, New Zealand
- Writing career
- Genre: Poetry
- Notable works: Up Here on the Hill, Wild Daisies: The Best of Bub Bridger

Noeline Edith "Bub" Bridger MNZM (15 July 1924 – 8 December 2009) was a New Zealand poet and short story writer and actor, who often performed her own work and drew inspiration from her Māori, Irish and English ancestry.

== Early life ==
Bridger was born in Napier, New Zealand, of Ngāti Kahungunu and Irish descent. She grew up in Napier during the depression years. She attended several primary schools in the region followed by Napier Intermediate, and then one year at Napier Girls' High School. She left school after the third form and found work in Napier in local factories. In 1942, Bridger moved with her father to Wellington and worked in the Social Security Department. She married and had four children, but the marriage failed and she raised the children on her own.

== Writing ==
Bridger was interested in writing from an early age. During her school years, she excelled in reading and writing. After her children had grown up, at the age of 50 she enrolled in a creative writing course being held at Victoria University in 1974, taught by Michael King. Describing her experience at this course, she said: "Michael was the one who showed me the way. When he read my first short story he said: 'You are going to be a writer.'"

Bridger's first published story, "The Stallion", featured in the New Zealand Listener in 1975.

Her writing was largely anthologized and she published several book-length collections of poetry, including Up Here on the Hill (1989) and Wild Daises: The Best of Bub Bridger. Her writing is known for its energy, comedy and the use of fantasy.

== Performance ==
Bridger was a well-known performer who acted on stage, notably with Hens' Teeth Women's Comedy Company, and she also wrote for television and broadcast radio.

== Later years ==
Bridger moved to Westport in 1994 and then to Granity. She died at her home in Granity on 8 December 2009, aged 85.

== Honours and awards ==
In the 2002 Queen's Birthday and Golden Jubilee Honours, Bridger was appointed a Member of the New Zealand Order of Merit, for services to literature.

== Bibliography ==
- Wendt, Albert; Whaitiri, Reina; Sullivan, Robert, eds. (September 2010). Mauri Ola: Contemporary Polynesian Poems in English. Auckland: Auckland UP. ISBN 9781869404482.
