= Red Mole (theatre company) =

NZ theatre company (1970s–2000s)

Red Mole was an avant garde theatre company from New Zealand. It was founded by Alan Brunton and Sally Rodwell in 1974.

== Biography ==
Red Mole was formed in 1974 by Alan Brunton and Sally Rodwell. Other members of the company included Deborah Hunt, John Davies, Ian Prior, Jan Preston, Rose Beauchamp (Wedde), Jean McAllister and Martin Edmond. Red Mole was one of the best known alternative theatre companies in New Zealand. In 1977, they toured New Zealand with Split Enz. Red Mole later travelled internationally. From 1978 to 1988 it was based in the United States and Europe.

In both New Zealand and overseas, Red Mole was backed by the band Red Alert.

Red Mole was known for its rough, political and experimental style. Its productions often combined a low life New Zealand style humour and sentiment with high-art European Modernism. Authorship of Red Mole works was complex as Brunton and Rodwell wrote for the company both individually and together, but many other works were devised by the entire company.

In 1979, Sam Neill wrote and directed a documentary on Red Mole, titled Red Mole On the Road. In 1992 their production, The Book of Life, was performed at the Adelaide Fringe.

Red Mole created a manifesto with five principles:

1. to keep (the) romance alive.
2. to escape programmed behaviour by remaining erratic.
3. to preserve the unclear and inexplicit idioms of everyday speech.
4. to abhor the domination of any person over any other.
5. to expend energy.

With the deaths of Brunton in 2002 and Rodwell in 2006, Red Mole effectively dissolved.

== Films ==
Two films of Red Mole's work were made. Red Mole on the Road (1979) was directed by Sam Neill. Radio with Pictures - Red Mole (Life is a Zoo) (1980), much of which was filmed in Wellington Zoo, was directed by Tony Holden.

Return Season by Barry Thomas, Sally Rodwell, Alan Brunton

The film Red Mole: a romance directed by Annie Goldson was released in 2023.

== Works ==
- Whimsy and the Seven Spectacles (1974)
- Siddhartha (1975)
- Cabaret Paris Spleen (1975)
- Vargos Circus (1976)
- Ace Follies (1976)
- Towards Bethlemhem (1976)
- Cabaret Pekin 1949 (1976)
- Cabaret Capital Strut (1977)
- Slaughter On Cockroach Ave (1977)
- Pacific Nights (1977)
- Ghost Rite (1978)
- Our World (1978)
- Crazy In The Streets (1978)
- Bitter Lemons (1978)
- Goin' To Djibouti (1978 and 1979)
- Last Days of Mankind (1979)
- Blood In The Cracks (1979)
- Dead Fingers Walk (1979)
- Numbered Days In Paradise (1979)
- Lord Galaxy's Travelling Players (1980)
- I'll Never Dance Down Bugis St Again (1980)
- The Redmole Version (1980)
- The Early Show/The Late Show (1980)
- The Excursion (1982)
- Childhood of A Saint (1982)
- 2 Quacks on Io (1983)
- The Rise & Fall of T D Lysenko (1983)
- Liberty Is Not Won With Flowers (1983)
- Dreamings End (1984)
- Poems for the Young At Hearts (1984)
- Cabaret Katti Mundoo (1985)
- Circi Sfumato (1985)
- Lost Chants For The Living (1986)
- Playtime (1987)
- Hour of Justice (1987 and 1988)
- Gas Attack!! (1988)
- New Hope (1988)
- Comrade Savage (1989)
- The Book of Life (1992)
