= Harry Lyon (musician) =

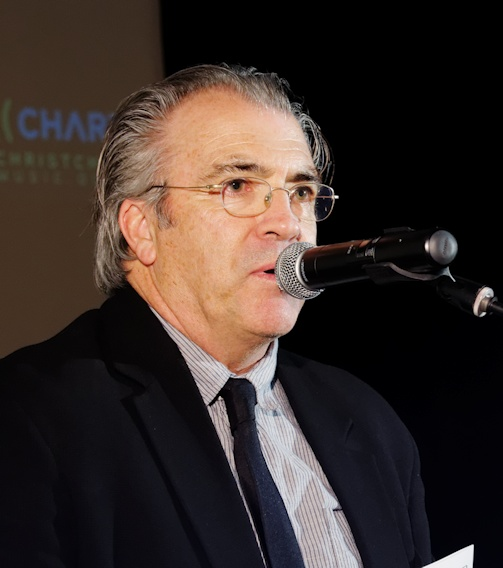
- Harry Lyon in 2010

Background information
- Born: 1950 (age 75–76)
- Origin: New Zealand
- Genres: Rock, pop
- Occupations: Musician, songwriter

Harry Lyon is a New Zealand musician and songwriter. He first came to prominence as a member of the band Hello Sailor after playing with Christchurch top 40 band Beam.

In 1980 after Hello Sailor, Lyon formed Coup D'État with Jan Preston, Neil Hannan and Steve Osborne (who was replaced by Paul Dunningham after a short time). They toured the country and performed at the second 'Sweetwaters Music Festival' in January 1981. Coup D'etat were awarded the 1981 RIANZ Single of the Year for "Dr I Like Your Medicine". The band split the following year.

In 1982 Graham Brazier formed the Legionnaires and Lyon joined a revised line-up, but Brazier suddenly formed a new band. Lyon joined Dave McArtney in the Pink Flamingos for a short time.

He appeared in the feature film Should I Be Good? in 1984, playing Nat Goodman, a former drug dealer just released from prison. Nat sang in nightclubs so Lyon also contributed music to the film.

Hello Sailor reformed for the opening of the renovated Gluepot in 1985 and, following the success of the performances, began touring again.

Lyon has an MCPA (Hons) (Master of Creative & Performing Arts) from the University of Auckland and is currently Director of MAINZ (Music and Audio Institute of New Zealand).

In May 2017, according to musician Delaney Davidson, Lyon is recording a solo album.

== Aotearoa Music Awards ==
The Aotearoa Music Awards (previously known as New Zealand Music Awards (NZMA)) are an annual awards night celebrating excellence in New Zealand music and have been presented annually since 1965.

Year	Nominee / work	Award	Result	Ref.
2011	Harry Lyon (as part of Hello Sailor)	New Zealand Music Hall of Fame	inductee	
