= Samhain (magazine) =

Irish theatrical periodical (1901–1908)

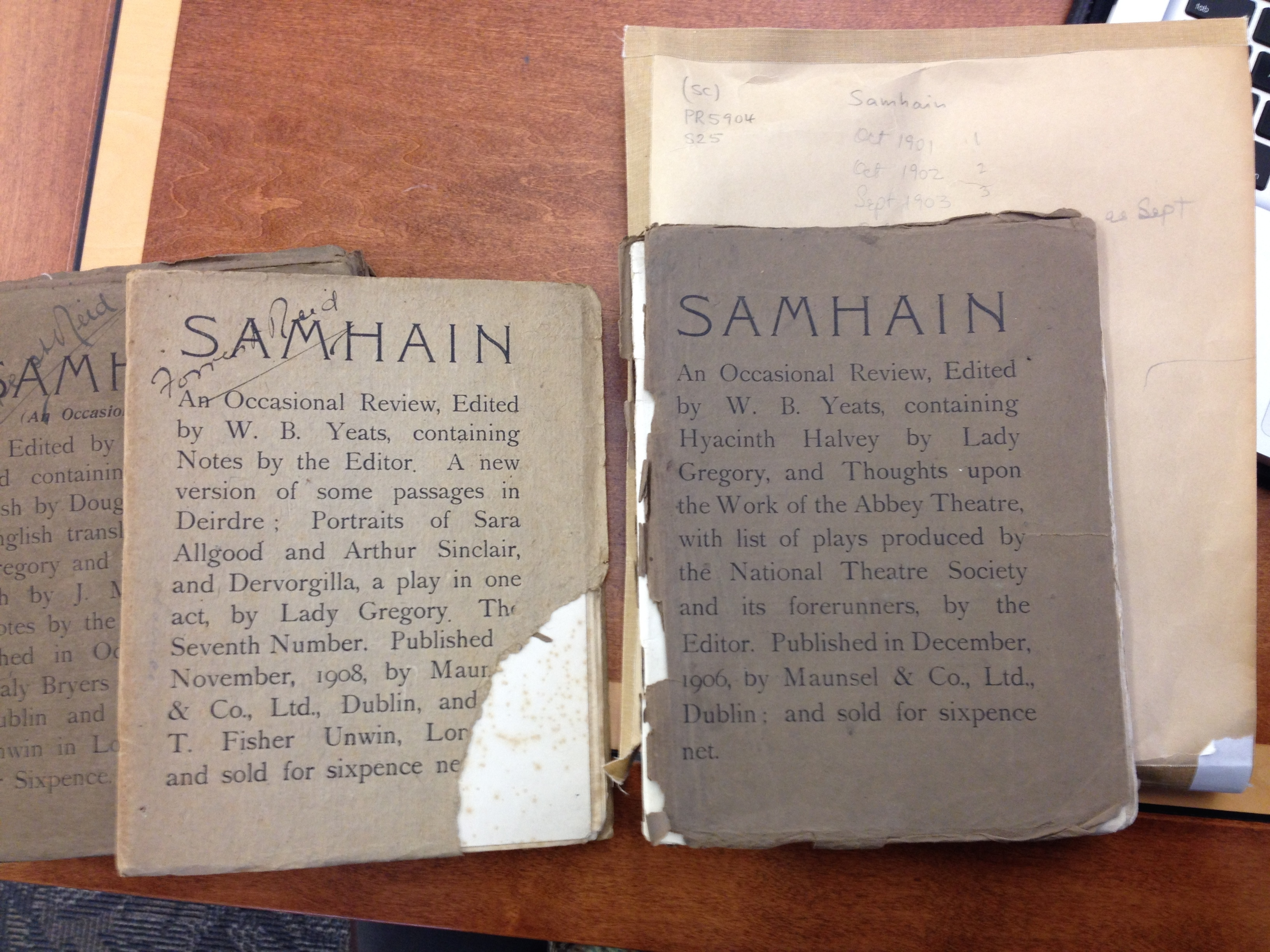
Three issues of Samhain

Samhain was an Irish theatrical periodical published irregularly, with an annual in December. The Irish poet W. B. Yeats was a regular and leading contributor of essays outlining his artistic principles. It existed between 1901 and 1908.

== History and profile ==
Samhain was established in 1901. Publication began in October 1901, superseding Beltaine, an occasional theatre review and publication of the Irish Literary Theatre named for the ancient Irish festival Bealtaine. The Irish Literary Theatre published Samhain. It has been noted that the two periodicals "constitute at once a history and a running critical commentary … of the origin and growth of the dramatic activity in Ireland."

In the first issue of Samhain, Yeats explained the name change as referring to "the old name for the beginning of winter, because our plays this year are in October, and because our Theatre is coming to an end in its present shape." Samhain also published the texts of new plays for a time, but later these were printed in book form as The Abbey Theatre Series. It supported the poetic drama. The magazine was published in Dublin by Sealy, Bryers & Walker, and in London by T. Fisher Unwin.

In 1908 Samhain ceased publication.

== Sources ==
- The Collected Letters of W.B. Yeats. Edited by John Kelly and Ronald Schuchard. Oxford University Press, 2005, pp. 15, 978, et passim.
