= Pinky Agnew =

Actor, author and social commentator based in New Zealand

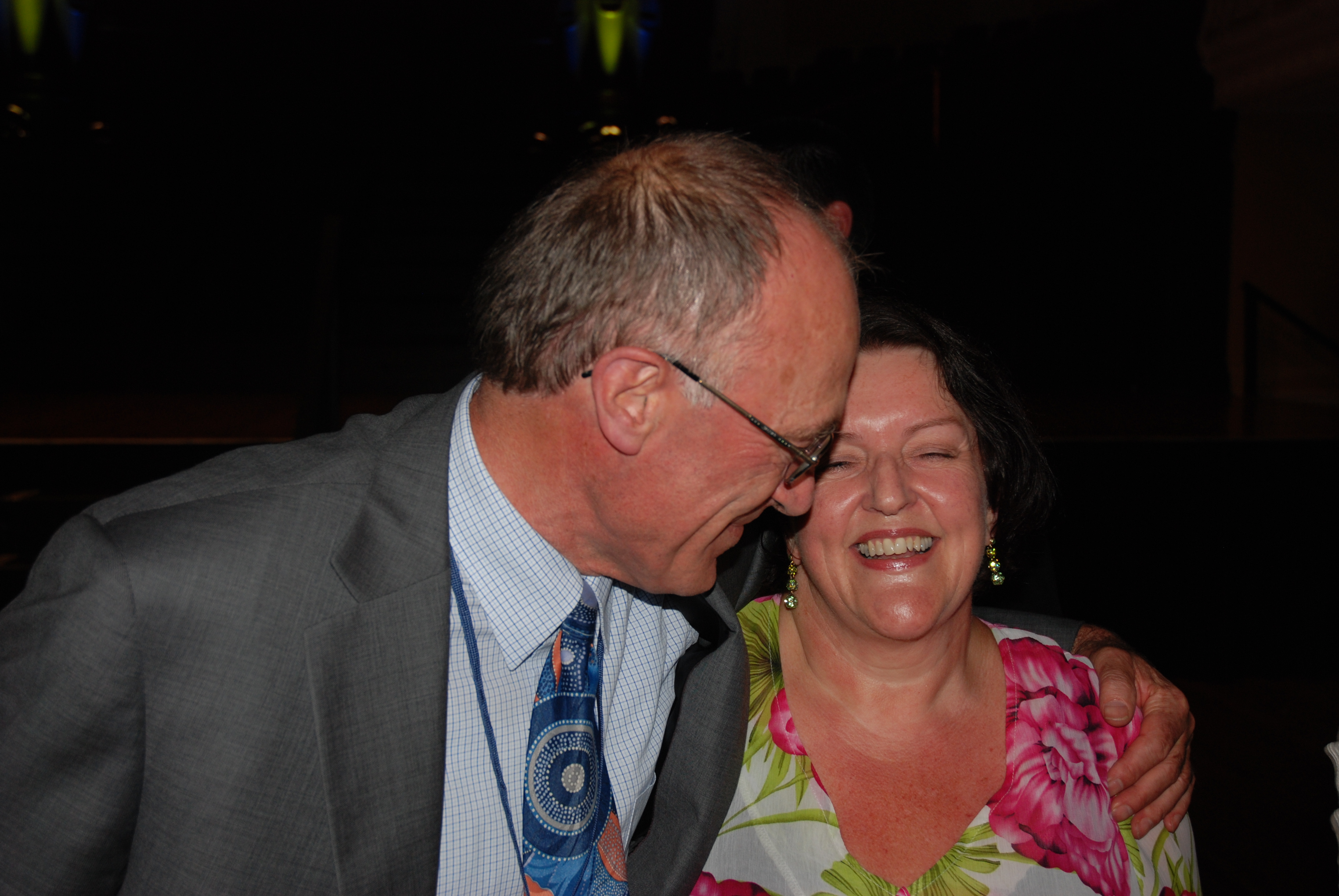
Dr Morgan Williams and Pinky Agnew

Pinky Agnew, MNZM (born 1955 in Port Chalmers) is an actor, author and social commentator based in Wellington in New Zealand. She has been a full-time performer and entertainer since 1990. In 2004 she appeared in the New Year's Honours list, becoming a member of the New Zealand Order of Merit (MNZM) for her services to entertainment.

Agnew appears frequently on radio in New Zealand and has featured in television shows impersonating Jenny Shipley, who served as Prime Minister of New Zealand from 1997 to 1999.

Agnew has been a wedding celebrant since 1996 and has been part of several hundred weddings. As well as weddings, she officiates at civil unions, naming ceremonies, and funerals.

== Plays ==
- Hens' Teeth Women's Comedy Company (1994–2002)
- The Power Breakfast (1994–1998)
- An Evening with Elvis-Anne
- Pinky Pops In
- The Truth about Love (2003) - a musical comedy
- The Candidates (2005) - a political comedy
- Party Girls (2011) - an election year comedy
- Sex Drive (2011) - a comedy about decisions in a women's life
- Destination Beehive (2014) - an election year political comedy

Pinky was one of the cast of Grumpy Old Woman Live, which toured all of New Zealand in March 2010 and again in a "mini tour" in September 2010.

== Books ==
- Heartsongs (Random House 2004) - a compilation of readings for weddings
- Lifesongs (Random House 2006) - readings for life's milestones
- Pinky's Poems (self published 2007) - collection of comic poems

== Television ==
- Love Mussel (2001) - about the unique properties of a New Zealand shellfish
- McPhail Gadsby (1998) - a political satire

== Radio ==
- The Pink Report (current) - weekly social commentary on Newstalk ZB in Wellington
- Nine To Noon with Kathryn Ryan (current) - monthly commentary with Te Radar on Radio New Zealand
