= Lorae Parry =

New Zealand playwright and actor

Lorae Parry MNZM
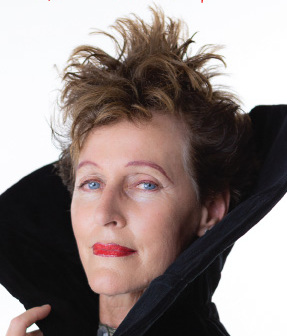
- Born: 1955 (age 69–70); Sydney, New South Wales, Australia
- Education: Diploma in Acting, Toi Whakaari, New Zealand Drama School, MA in Scriptwriting, Victoria University of Wellington
- Known for: playwriting, performance
- Notable work: Eugenia, 1996
- Style: Parry's plays often explore sexuality, gender, and class systems.

Lorae Ann Parry MNZM (born 1955) is an Australian-born New Zealand playwright and actress.

== Biography and education ==
She was born in 1955 in Sydney, Australia and in 1970 moved to New Zealand. Parry has two qualifications, a Diploma in Acting from Toi Whakaari, the national New Zealand Drama School in 1976, and a Master in Scriptwriting from Victoria University of Wellington.

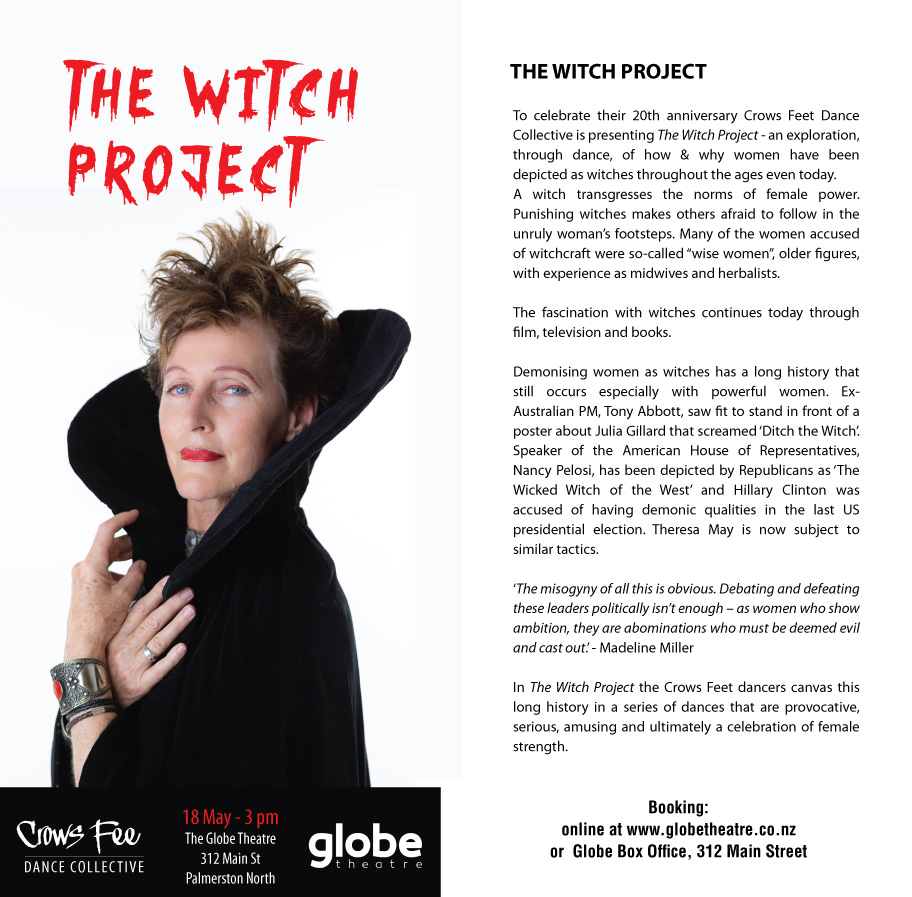
The Witch Project (2019) featuring Parry

== Career ==
A noted feminist playwright, Parry's plays often explore sexuality, gender, and class systems. Her first plays, Strip, and Frontwomen, used a combination of realism and humor to promote empowerment of women and more acceptance of lesbianism. The play Frontwomen was a breakthrough in history when it was the first lesbian play performed in New Zealand. However, her most influential play, Eugenia, was published in 1996 and explored the nature of sexuality and gender, as well as challenging social traditions around females. Eugenia is noted for its mixing of the magical and supernatural with the true historical figure Eugene Falleni, an Italian-Australian transgender man convicted of the 1917 murder of his first wife. Parry constantly focuses on empowering women through theatre and through her plays, she focuses on the importance of women's lives. She continues to be active in women's issues through play publishing and theatre.

Parry is a performer including being part of the Crows Feet Dance Collective, a dance company for women with a lowest age limit of 40 years. She is known for her stage impersonation of former New Zealand prime minister Helen Clark.

== Plays ==
- (1986) Strip
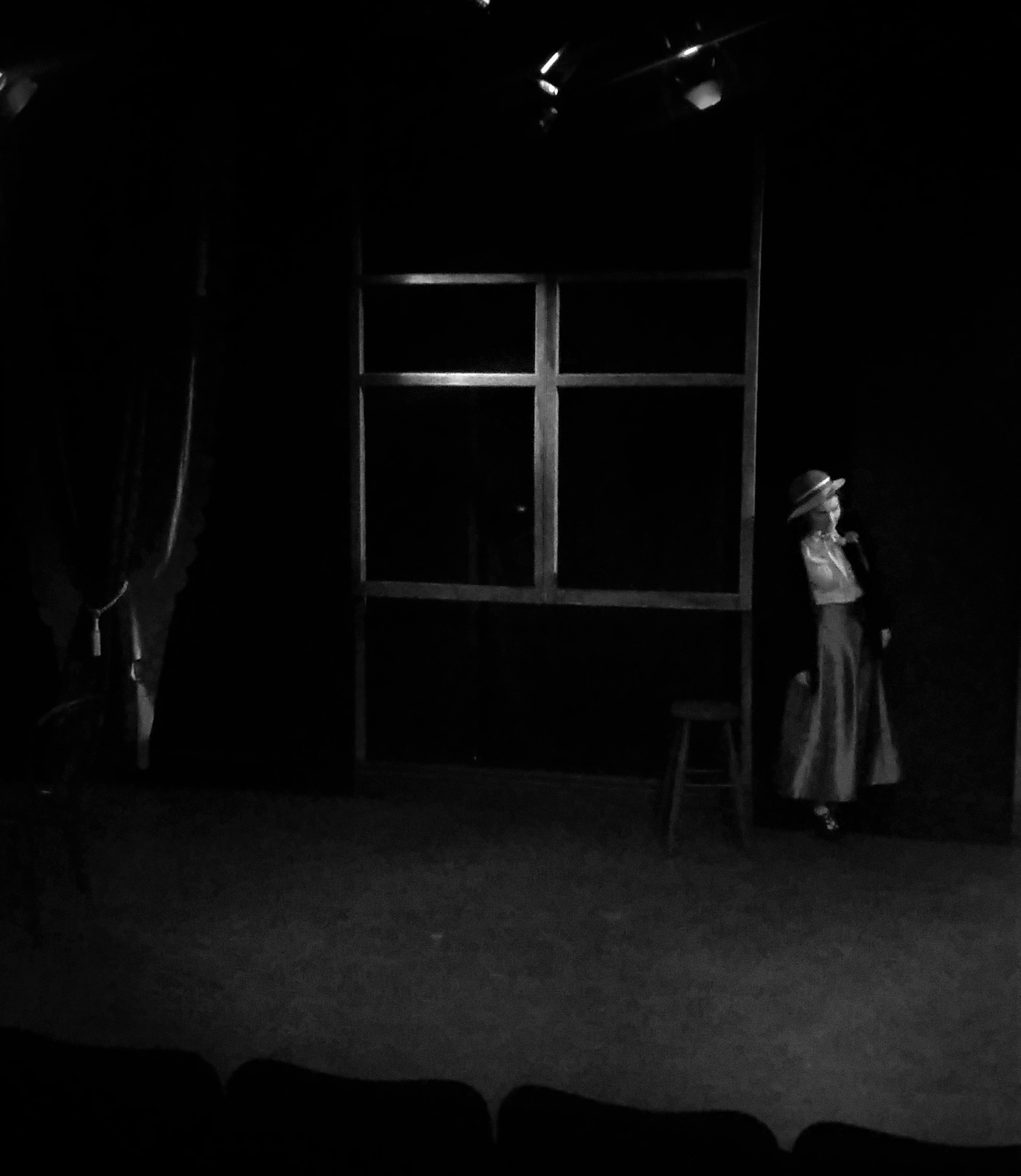
  Season of Scarlet and Gold at Circa Theatre in 2016
- (1992) Digger & Nudger Try Harder, co-written by Carmel McGlone
- (1993) Frontwomen
- (1994) Cracks
- (1996) Eugenia
- (2002) Vagabonds
- (2003) The Truth About Loven, co-written by Pinky Agnew
- (2006) The Candidates, co-written Pinky Agnew
- (2008) Kate & Mrs Jones
- (2010) Bloomsbury Women & The Wild Colonial Girl
- (2010) Sex Drive, co-written by Pinky Agnew
- (2014) Destination Beehive, co-written by Pinky Agnew
- (2016) Scarlet & Gold

== Film ==
- (1988) Send a Gorilla as Sender of revenge gram

== Honours and awards ==
- 1994 – Awarded Stout Fellowship, Victoria University of Wellington
- 1995 – The Reader's Digest PEN Stout Research Centre Fellowship
- 1998 – Writer in Residence, Victoria University of Wellington. Parry was the first female playwright to achieve this award.
- 2004 – Appointed a Member of the New Zealand Order of Merit, for services to the performing arts, in the 2004 New Year Honours
