= Magdalena Project =

International network of women in contemporary theatre

The Magdalena Project is an international network of women in contemporary theatre and performance. It aims to increase awareness of women's contributions to theatre and to create the artistic and economic structures and support networks to enable women to work.

== Background ==
The idea for a network of women theatre practitioners was born in a café in Trevignano, Italy in September 1983, during a festival of alternative theatre: a discussion on the predominance of male directors and writers at the festival led Jill Greenhalgh to ask what such a festival might be like if the primary creative voices were those of women. Inspired by this, Greenhalgh organised MAGDALENA '86 - The First International Festival of Women in Contemporary Theatre, in Cardiff, Wales in August 1986 and at this event the Magdalena Project was founded.

From then until 1999, The Magdalena Project operated from an administrative base in Cardiff, with a board of advisors and Greenhalgh as its artistic director. During this period the Magdalena Project produced performances, organised workshops and festival gatherings in Europe and published a regular newsletter.

In 1988, women theatre practitioners in Latin America became involved, organising meetings in Peru, Colombia and Uruguay, and extending the network to Chile and Argentina with further meetings in 1993. This was to be the beginning of growing interest in the Project from around the world, with affiliate groups forming and hosting festivals and events in many countries.

In 1999, the Welsh Arts Council ceased its infrastructure funding of the Magdalena Project, necessitating the closure of the Cardiff office and the cessation of most cost-bearing activities. However, by this time the network was strongly established at an international level, and was about to launch its web site and email list. The move into online communications ensured the continuation of the network despite the loss of funding.

== International Festivals and Affiliate Groups ==
The international membership of the Magdalena Project network is made up of individuals (of all genders and sex [non]identifications), theatre companies and organisations; in some locations affiliate Magdalena groups have been formally established. These groups are autonomous and all of their activities are organised and funded locally. Since 1986 festivals have been held throughout Europe, including in Wales, Denmark, Norway, Germany, Italy, France, Spain, and Belgium. The Transit Festival of Women's Performance is held approximately every three years at Odin Teatret, Denmark, organised by Julia Varley, one of the founders of the Magdalena Project.

The Latin American network has been operating since 1988, with festivals taking place in Argentina, Colombia, Cuba, Peru, Brasil, Mexico, Chile and Ecuador. In Argentina, the network has operated under the name Magdalena 2nd Generacion since 1999.

In 1997 Magdalena Aotearoa was officially established in New Zealand and an international festival of women's performance was held there in 1999. Other festivals outside Europe and Latin America have been held in Australia (2003), USA (2005), Singapore (2006) and India (2012, 2016 and 2019). Other companies and festivals that are connected to the Magdalena Project include Grenland Friteater (Norway), Teatro delle Radici (Switzerland), AMAR (Colombia), DAH Teater (Serbia), Voix de Femmes (Belgium), Voix Polyphoniques (France), Teatret OM (Denmark), Double Edge (USA) and others.

An up-to-date list of Magdalena festivals and events around the world is available in the Archive section of the Magdalena Project website.

== Publications ==
Numerous books, journals and articles have been published about the Magdalena Project and by members of the network, contributing to the documentation of women's contemporary theatre and performance. Up-to-date information can be found in the https://themagdalenaproject.org/en/content/publications of the Magdalena Project website.

TheMagdalenaProject@25 - Legacy and Challenge - published in 2011 to celebrate the Project's 25th anniversary, this book includes contributions by Gilly Adams, Geddy Aniksdal, Jill Greenhalgh, Julia Varley, Maggie B. Gale, Susan Bassnett and 40 other women closely associated with The Magdalena Project.

Magdalena: international women's experimental theatre - compiled and introduced by Susan Bassnett, this hardcover book records the early years of the Magdalena Project, illustrated with black-and-white photos. Contact the publisher: Berg, 77 Morrell Ave., Oxford, OX4 1NQ, UK. ISBN 0-85496-016-3.

The Way of Magdalena - by Chris Fry, published in 2007 by Open Page Publications, with the support of Odin Teatrets Forlag, Grenland Friteater, The Magdalena Project and CTLS - Centre for Theatre Laboratory Studies; ISBN 978-87-87292-13-9.

The Open Page - a journal of women's thoughts, questions and visions for theatre, published annually from 1996 to 2008 by Odin Teatret in association with the Magdalena Project

The Articulate Practitioner - Articulating Practice - produced and Compiled by Jill Greenhalgh and Mike Brookes This interactive DVD comprises research materials generated by The Magdalena Project: International Network of Women in Contemporary Theatre. The DVD includes documentary material from artist-led workshops, performances, performed lectures, presentations and academic papers.
