= Richard Huber =

Actor, director, playwright in New Zealand

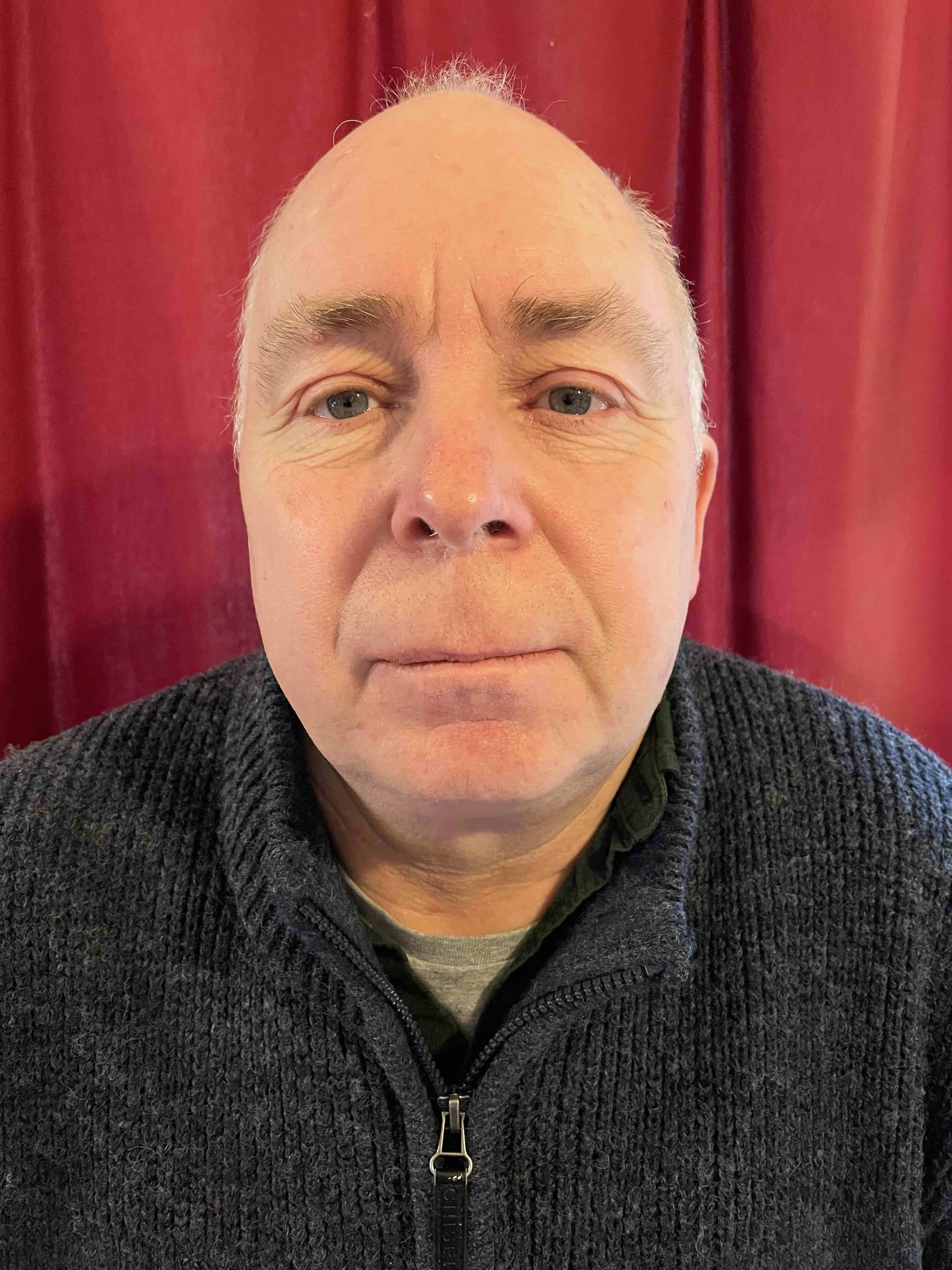
- Born: 1960 (age 65–66)

Richard Huber (born 1960) is a playwright, actor and director based in Dunedin, New Zealand.

== Early life and education ==
Born in 1960, Huber's early theatre work included performances for Splinta and Terra Firma, two stilt theatre companies based in Christchurch. In 1993, he moved to Dunedin to teach theatre at the University of Otago.

== Work ==
Huber is the author of a number of plays, including:

- Red Seven (1991), co-written with Nic Farra, and inspired by Akira Kurosawa's The Seven Samurai.
- Bruised (1993)
- Lingering (1995)
- Parasol (1996), co-devised with Greg Brooks
- The Bookshop (1997)
- 3 Days, 5 Hours and 36 Minutes (1997)
- Envious Sliver (1998), co-devised with Debbie Hoar
- Happy and Beautiful (1998)
- Hamlet - He Was a Grave Digger (1998), a deconstruction of Shakespeare's Hamlet, set in a parodic version of Australia, and featuring a fantasy version of Chips Rafferty, who apparently once expressed an interest in playing Hamlet.
- Airport (1999), co-devised with Hilary Halba
- Café Café (1999)
- Supermarket (2000), co-devised with Hilary Halba
- The Dangerous Wife (2002)
- Glorious (2009)
- Hubble (2009), co-devised with Nadya Shaw Bennett and Martyn Roberts
- One Day (2010), co-devised with Barbara Power and Simon O'Connor
- Voice of Heaven (2010), a play about Dr Donald Stuart, the first minister of Knox Church, Dunedin.
- Songbird (2012) at the Globe Theatre, Dunedin, drawing in part on Huber's love for the musical The Sound of Music.

His play St Joan on Broadway was workshopped by the Fortune Theatre in 2012.

He has extensive directing credits, including many works presented in the Lunchtime Theatre programme at Allen Hall Theatre. Recent directing work includes:

- Blood of the Lamb by Bruce Mason at the Globe Theatre, Dunedin for the Dunedin Arts Festival, as part of the inaugural New Zealand Theatre Month.
- Simple Acts of Malice by Vincent O'Sullivan for the Dunedin Arts Festival, 2021.
- Toy Factory Fire for Talking House at the Dunedin Public Art Gallery, as part of the 2021 Dunedin Arts Festival - a performance art installation.

Huber was the overall artistic director for Farley's Arcade (2015), a project devised by Wow! Productions, and presented as a promenade piece through the Athenaeum Building, Dunedin.

His radio script, Country Life, or Up, Down and Over at the Abbey - a satire of Downton Abbey - was given a reading by the Stage South Collective in 2015 as part of Marginalia: A Fringe Celebration of a City of Literature.

Huber's production of Waiting For Godot at the Globe Theatre, Dunedin (2011) won two Dunedin Theatre Awards - production of the year and best director.

He has had extensive work as an actor, including performances for the Fortune Theatre and for WoW! Productions, and has also featured in two short films by Good Company Arts (Daniel Belton and co) - Ato-Mick (2010) and Ato-Miss (2012), also featuring Sir Jon Trimmer. Both films screened at the "Linoleum" International Festival of Contemporary Animation and Media Art in Moscow.

== Awards and honours ==
Huber won the Best Director award for Waiting For Godot at the Dunedin Theatre Awards in 2011. In 2013 he won the Narrative/Script of the Year Award at the Dunedin Theatre Awards for Songbird.
