= Dunedin Theatre Awards =

Annual theatre awards in New Zealand

The Dunedin Theatre Awards are annual theatre awards in Dunedin, New Zealand. The awards were established in 2010 by director and actor Patrick Davies, and the winners are selected by a panel of theatre reviewers. The winners are selected by the Dunedin Reviewers Collective.

== 2010 awards ==
The first awards were presented by Mayor Dave Cull in December 2010 at an event held at the Fortune Theatre. The panel of reviewers who selected the winners consisted of Anna Chinn, Jimmy Currin, Barbara Frame, Terry MacTavish, Sharon Matthews, and Jen Aitken. The awards were criticised when 6 out of 7 awards were won by the Fortune Theatre, and no awards were given to visiting production Miss Saigon. Founder of the awards Patrick Davies said that the awards explicitly excluded children's theatre, musical theatre or "anything to do with education" from consideration, but that categories for those types of production might be included the following year. The OSTAs (Otago Southland Theatre Awards) were launched in 2013 to reward achievements in musical theatre.

| Award | Winner | Notes |
|---|---|---|
| Technical design | Peter King for Wuthering Heights | at the Fortune Theatre. King was head of design at Fortune Theatre. |
| Scenographic design | Peter King for The Pitmen Painters | at the Fortune Theatre |
| Dunedin script | Harry Love for All's Well that Ends | at the Globe Theatre |
| Production of the year | The Pitmen Painters | at the Fortune Theatre |
| Male performance | John Glass in The Pitmen Painters | at the Fortune Theatre |
| Female performance | Anna Henare in Wuthering Heights | at the Fortune Theatre |
| Director | Patrick Davies for The Pitmen Painters | at the Fortune Theatre |
| Outstanding contribution to Dunedin theatre | Nicholas McBryde | Founding director of the Otago Festival of the Arts. "For his work in establishing the Otago festival. |
| Wild card awards | Karen Elliot Janice Cheng Kathryn Hurst Vicki Cross | Interim Fortune Theatre manager Dunedin theatre stalwart Anti-Social Tap founder Anti-Social Tap founder |

== 2011 Awards ==
The 2011 Awards were held at the Playhouse Theatre on 12 December 2011.

| Award | Winner | Notes |
|---|---|---|
| Production of the year | Waiting For Godot | at the Globe Theatre |
| Best director | Richard Huber for Waiting For Godot | at the Globe Theatre |
| Best female performance | Elena Stejko in A Shortcut To Happiness | at the Fortune Theatre |
| Best male performance | Peter Hayden in A Shortcut To Happiness | at the Fortune Theatre |
| Best design (scenographic) | Peter King for set design for Avenue Q | at the Fortune Theatre |
| Best design (technical) | Stephen Kilroy for lighting design for The Tutor | at the Fortune Theatre |
| Best publicity | James Higgs, Miguel Nitis and Nikki Kidd for Avenue Q | at the Fortune Theatre |
| Emerging talent | Jake Metzger for The Tutor | at the Fortune Theatre |
| Best visiting production | Mates And Lovers | by Fabulous Arts Aotearoa New Zealand |
| Best script/narrative | Simon Cunliffe for The Truth Game | at the Fortune Theatre |
| Rising star award | Stageworks Theatre Society Otago Inc, RAD Productions and Young, Wild and Fortunate | |
| Outstanding contribution to Dunedin theatre | Clare Adams | Wow! Productions producer and Stage South founder |
| Lifetime achievement award | playwright Roger Hall | |

== 2012 awards ==
In 2012 a decision-making matrix was introduced to the judging process to try to achieve a fairer result. New awards were introduced for emerging talent, industry support, outstanding contribution to Dunedin theatre and for lifetime achievement. The awards ceremony was held at the Mayfair Theatre on 11 December.

| Award | Winner | Notes |
|---|---|---|
| Production | Play | by the Fortune Theatre, in the Standard Insurance building in the Exchange |
| Director | Lara Macgregor for Play | by the Fortune Theatre |
| Female performance | Hilary Halba for Play | by the Fortune Theatre |
| Male performance | Simon O'Connor for Heroes | by the Fortune Theatre |
| Scenographical designer | Hannah Kidd for Play | by the Fortune Theatre |
| Technical designer | Stephen Kilroy for Play | by the Fortune Theatre |
| Promotion | Cabaret Botanica, by Inge Andrewes | |
| Emerging artists | Grace Park and Alex Wilson | |
| Visiting production | Richard Meros Salutes the Southern Man | by Conditional Productions |
| Script/narrative | Death*Sex*Magic | by Jonathan Cweorth |
| Outstanding industry support | Bill Noble and University Book Shop | |
| Outstanding contribution to Dunedin theatre | Michael Andrewes and the Really Authentic Gilbert and Sullivan Performance Trust | |
| Lifetime achievement award | Shirley Kelly, Mary Dixon, Denise Walsh and Louise Petherbridge | |

== 2013 awards ==
The 2013 awards were held at the Globe Theatre on 15 December.

| Award | Winner | Notes |
|---|---|---|
| Technical Design of the Year | Midge aka Brendon McBryde for music design for Sheep | by Counterpoint |
| Scenographic Design of the Year | Sofie Welvaert for costume design for Macbeth | at the Globe Theatre |
| Promotion of the Year | Angus McBryde, Jozephine Parker, Hadley R. Taylor for Moose Murders | by Counterpoint |
| Visiting Production of the Year | Travelling Medicine Show by Porcelain Punch | at the Fortune Theatre |
| Narrative/Script of the Year | Richard Huber for Songbird | |
| Female Performance of the Year | Sophie Hambleton in Gifted | |
| Male Performance of the Year | Simon O'Connor in Gifted | |
| Direction of the Year | Abby Howells for Moose Murder | |
| Production of the Year | Tribes | at the Fortune Theatre |
| Emerging Artist of the Year | Abby Howells | "for her sterling work in writing" |
| Emerging Artist of the Year | Alexandra Ross | "for her lighting work in various theatres" |
| Outstanding Industry Support | Dunedin Performance Journal | "for its work creating a formidable forum and platform for online discussion of the theatre around Dunedin" |
| Outstanding Contribution to Dunedin Theatre | Rosemary Beresford | for "vital and tireless [work] in responding to the Globe Theatre’s restoration" |
| Lifetime Achievement award | Hilary Norris | she "was there at the beginning of the Fortune Theatre and has been a vital and active worker, bringing powerful performances as an actor and incisive direction to the stage" |
| Lifetime Achievement award | Harry Love | he "has worked tirelessly to provide top quality classics – both ancient and modern to our audiences" |

== 2014 awards ==
The 2014 awards at were held at the Fortune Theatre on 16 December. A new nationwide initiative to honour longevity and commitment to theatre was launched, with awards for practitioners involved in 25, 50 and 100 professional shows. Shirley Kelly, Louise Petherbridge, and Hilary Norris were honoured for completing more than 100 professional shows. For more than 50 professional shows, Martyn Roberts, Lisa Warrington, Lara Macgregor, Terry MacTavish, Peter King, Julie Edwards, and Simon O'Connor were honoured. In the third category, for more than 25 professional shows, honours went to Hilary Halba, Karen Elliot, Vivien Aitken, Barry Dorking, Matthew Wilson, and Patrick Davies.

| Award | Winner | Notes |
|---|---|---|
| Technical Design of the Year | Martyn Roberts for light design for This Other Eden | by Opera Otago |
| Scenographic Design of the Year | Brenda Rendall for costume design for This Other Eden | by Opera Otago |
| Promotion of the Year | Andrew Brinsley-Pirie, Rosemary Beresford, Dale Neill, Keith Scott, Sofie Welvaert for A Midsummer Night’s Dream promotion campaign | by the Globe Theatre |
| Visiting Production of the Year | Promise & Promiscuity | by Hotpink Productions |
| The Robert Lord Narrative/Script of the Year | Stuart Young, Cindy Diver, Susie Lawless for The Keys Are In The Margarine | by Talking House. This award this year was sponsored by a donor who asked that it be named for Dunedin playwright Robert Lord. |
| Female Performance of the Year | Angela Johnson in Souvenir | |
| Male Performance of the Year | Jason Whyte in The Caretaker Ken Blackburn in The Caretaker Kip Chapman in The Caretaker | Three winners were awarded "to acknowledge the tight ensemble acting in this three-man production." |
| Director of the Year | Jacqueline Coats for This Other Eden | |
| The 'Outstanding Performance' Production of the Year | Peninsula | by Fortune Theatre. This award "was sponsored for 2014 by Outstanding Performance, a company which began in Dunedin and which employs actors nationwide for simulated patient and leadership training work." |
| Emerging Theatre Artist Award | Rosie Howells, Nell Guy, and Heidi Geissler | Three people were awarded, "all with strong links to both Counterpoint and to the female comedy troupe Discharge." |
| A one-off, special award category was created as "to acknowledge the number of quality theatre shows presented this year that commemorated World War I." | Journey’s End | by Globe Theatre |
| Outstanding Contribution to Dunedin Theatre | Allen Hall Theatre in its centenary year | |
| Lifetime Achievement award | Lisa Warrington | |

== 2015 awards ==
The sixth annual awards were held at the Allen Hall Theatre on 7 December.

| Award | Winner | Notes |
|---|---|---|
| ‘Robert Lord Award’ for Script/Narrative of the Year | Phil Braithwaite for The War Play | by Fortune Theatre |
| Promotion of the Year | Gareth McMillan & Zoe Robson for Farley's Arcade | Wow! Productions |
| Technical Design of the Year | Matthew Morgan for sound for The Hound of the Baskervilles | by Fortune Theatre |
| Scenographic Design of the Year | Martyn Roberts, Richard Clark, Stephen Kilroy for set design for Farley's Arcade | Wow! Productions |
| Female Performer of the Year | Nadya Shaw Bennett in Farley's Arcade | Wow! Productions |
| Male Performer of the Year | Jared Kirkwood in Punk Rock | by Fortune Theatre |
| Outstanding Contribution of the Year | Lara Macgregor | Fortune Theatre |
| Director of the Year | Lara Macgregor for Punk Rock | Fortune Theatre |
| Ensemble of the Year | The Hound of the Baskervilles cast | Fortune Theatre |
| ‘Outstanding Performance’ Production of the Year | Punk Rock | by Fortune Theatre/ OU Theatre Studies |
| Special Awards Presented: Lifetime Achievement | Natalie Ellis | |
| Kaitiaki | Rua McCallum | |
| ‘Otago Community Trust’ Outstanding Community Event | 86 hour Shakespeare Marathon | Fortune Theatre |
| ‘Otago Community Trust’ Outstanding Community Event | Farley’s Arcade: The Wildest Place in Town | Wow! Productions |
| ‘DCC Creative Communities Scheme’ Outstanding Community Engagement | Talking House | |

== 2016 awards ==
The 2016 awards were held on the 5 December at the Fortune Theatre.

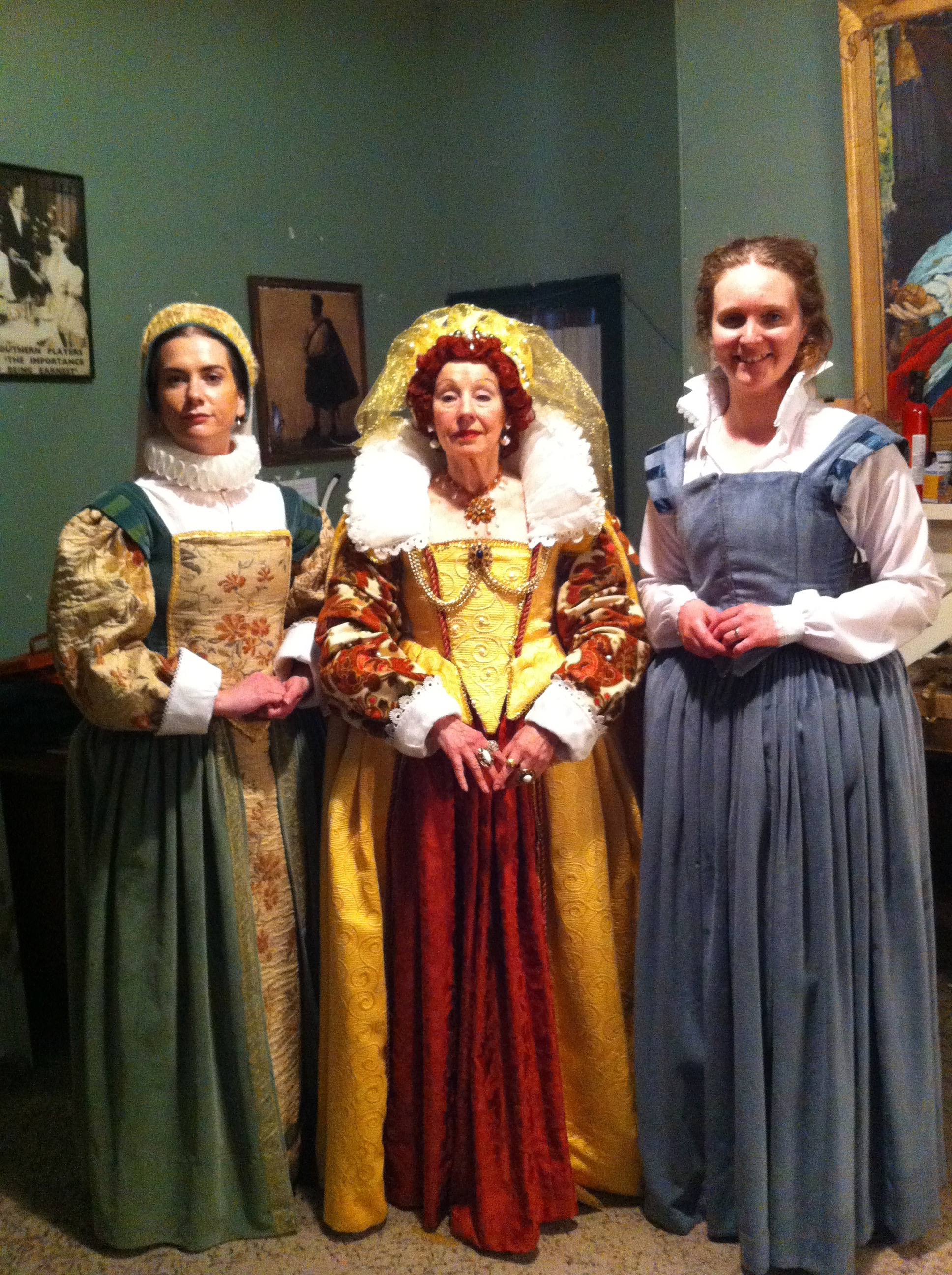
Some of the costumes for Mary Stuart, which won Charmian Smith the 2016 costume design award. From left, Emer Lyons as the maid, Terry MacTavish as Elizabeth I, and Helen Fearnley, who received the Outstanding Performance award for her role as Mary Stuart.

| Award | Winner | Notes |
|---|---|---|
| Outstanding Lighting Design | Martyn Roberts for Wai=Rua A Line=Near | |
| Watson White Award for Outstanding Costume Design | Charmian Smith for Mary Stuart | |
| Outstanding Use of Digital Technologies | Grounded – Digital Design | |
| Outstanding Set Design | Peter King for Winston's Birthday | |
| DCC Creative Communities Scheme Award for Outstanding Innovation | Circus Alice by Brophy Aerials | |
| Robert Lord Award for Outstanding Script/Narrative | Paul Baker for Winston's Birthday | |
| DCC Creative Communities Scheme Award for Outstanding Ensemble | The Skriker cast | |
| Otago Community Trust Special Event 2016 Marking the ‘Shakespeare 400’ | Globe Theatre for The Comedy of Errors | |
| Outstanding Performance In A Female Role | Claire Chitham for Grounded [contemporary] Helen Fearnley for Mary Stuart [classical] | |
| Outstanding Performance In A Male Role | Simon O'Connor for Krapp's Last Tape | |
| Counterpoint Productions Award for Emerging Talent | Jordan Dickson | |
| Director of the Year | Keith Scott for Mary Stuart | |
| Outstanding Contribution to New Zealand Theatre 2016 | John Smythe, Managing Editor, Theatreview | |
| Outstanding Contribution to Dunedin Theatre 2016 | Nicholas McBryde, Director, Arts Festival Dunedin | |
| Production of the Year | Grounded by Fortune Theatre | |

== 2017 awards ==
The 2017 award ceremony was held on 4 December at the Athenaeum Theatre.

| Award | Winner | Notes |
|---|---|---|
| Outstanding Lighting Design | Garry Keirle for Into The Woods | |
| ‘Watson White’ Award for Outstanding Costume Design | Sofie Welvaert for Pirates Of Penzance | |
| ‘Robert Lord’ Award for Outstanding Script/Narrative/Libretto | Keith Scott for 1917: Until The Day Dawns | |
| Outstanding Set Design | Peter King for Twelfth Night | |
| Outstanding Sound Design | Lindsay Gordon for Into the Woods | |
| Outstanding Innovation (joint winners) | Brophy Aerial Studio for Fragments of a Dream Dunedin Medieval Society for The Bookworm Amanda Brosnan for Ghost Soldiers | |
| ‘Dunedin Goldsmiths’ Award for Outstanding Ensemble | Cast of The Pirates of Penzance | |
| Outstanding Performance (two awarded) | Jonathon Hendry as Malvolio in Twelfth Night Bryony Skillington as Feste in Twelfth Night | |
| Emerging Talent (two awarded) | Lydia Bernard Shaun Swain | |
| Outstanding Visiting Production | That Bloody Woman | |
| ‘Otago Community Trust’ Award for Outstanding Community Theatre | Stopping Violence Dunedin for Stories to Heal Violence | |
| Director of the Year | Lewis Ablett-Kerr for Never the Sinner | |
| ‘Outstanding Performance’ Award for Production of the Year | Twelfth Night | by Fortune Theatre |
| Special awards | Josh Thomas | for services to the Dunedin Fringe Festival |
| | Nigel Ensor and Peter King | for services to Dunedin theatre |

== 2018 awards ==
The 2018 awards were held at Hanover Hall on 10 December, and presented by Louise Petherbridge.

| Award | Winner | Notes |
|---|---|---|
| Outstanding Lighting Design | Martyn Roberts for Dark Matter | |
| Outstanding Sound Design | Shayne P. Carter for An Iliad | |
| ‘Watson White’ Award for Outstanding Design (Set/Costume/AV) | Rochelle Brophy for Elemental | |
| Outstanding Performance | Helen Fearnley as Henry Higginson in Blood of the Lamb Michael Hurst as The Poet in An Iliad Sara Georgie as Eloise and Karen in Eloise in the Middle | |
| ‘Robert Lord’ Award for Outstanding Script/Narrative/Libretto | Emily Duncan for Eloise in the Middle | |
| ‘Dunedin Goldsmiths’ Award for Outstanding Ensemble | cast of Jeeves and Wooster in Perfect Nonsense cast of 4 Note Opera | |
| Emerging Talent (two awarded) | Josephine Chan Josephine Devereaux | |
| Outstanding Visiting Production | Hudson and Halls Live | by Silo Theatre |
| ‘Otago Community Trust’ Award for Outstanding Community Theatre | Mental Notes, by Suitcase Theatre | |
| Contribution to Dunedin Theatre | Maryanne Wright-Smyth Brian Beresford | |
| Company of the Year | Arcade Theatre Company | |
| Director of the Year | Orion Carey-Clark, for The Lieutenant of Inishmore | |
| ‘Outstanding Performance’ Award for Production of the Year | An Iliad, by Fortune Theatre | |
| Special achievement | 70th anniversary celebration year, Taieri Dramatic Society | |
| Special Performance Achievement | Harrison Diver | |
| Most Spectacular Event | Elemental, by Brophy Aerials | |
| Outstanding Public Programme | Toitū Otago Settlers Museum | |
| Outstanding WW1 Community Commemoration | Homecoming, TheatreWorks and UO Theatre Studies Mārama Tōnu Hāhakaranga: Ake Ake Theatre Company | |

== 2019 awards ==
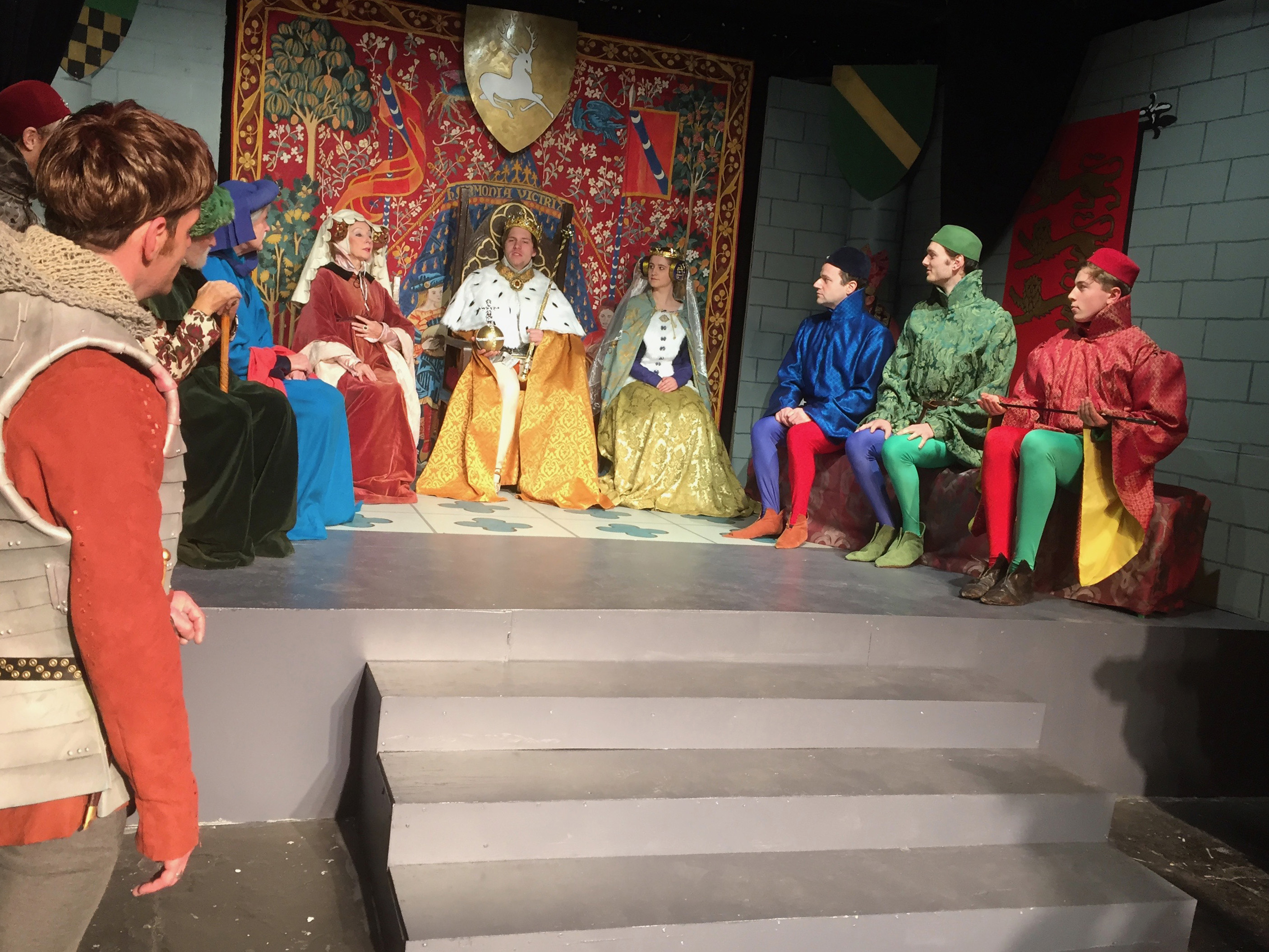
The opening scene from Globe Theatre's 2019 Richard II, based on a medieval Book of Hours. Charmian Smith won the Outstanding Technical Design award for costumes.

The tenth anniversary Dunedin Theatre Awards were held at Hanover Hall on 2 December. The awards were presented by Dunedin Theatre Awards founder Patrick Davies. Special presentations were made for longstanding achievements in theatre to Chris Manley, John Watson, and Playhouse Theatre, with a further special award recognising the recent UNESCO Cities of Literature Short Play Festival, and an award for the production of the decade.

| Award | Winner | Notes |
|---|---|---|
| Outstanding Technical Design (Light/Sound/AV) | Kerian Varaine for AV for The Toy Factory Fire | |
| Outstanding Technical Design – Set | Shannon van Rooijen for Wings | |
| Outstanding Technical Design – Costumes | Charmian Smith for Richard II | at the Globe |
| Outstanding Technical Design – Costumes | Maryanne Wright-Smyth for The Mikado | |
| Outstanding Performance | Nick Dunbar as Sam in The Flick | |
| Outstanding Performance | Cheyne Jenkinson for multiple roles & productions | |
| Outstanding Performance | Laura Wells as The Maid in Ophelia Thinks Harder | |
| Emerging Talent | Laniet Swann as Rory in A Hundred Words for Snow | |
| Outstanding Script/Narrative | Emily Duncan for Le Sujet Parle | |
| Outstanding Visiting Production | Measure for Measure | by the Pop Up Globe |
| Outstanding Community Engagement | Trouble – D | |
| Outstanding Ensemble | Cast of The Bald Soprano | |
| Director of the Year | Lara Macgregor for The Flick | |
| Production of the Year | The Bald Soprano | by Arcade |
| Company of the Year | The Globe Theatre | |
| Outstanding Service to Theatre in Education | Chris Manley | |
| Outstanding Contribution to Children's Theatre | Playhouse Theatre | |
| Outstanding Enterprise | UNESCO Cities of Literature Short Play Festival | |
| Outstanding Contribution to Dunedin Theatre | John Watson | |
| Production of the Decade | Punk Rock (2015) | |

== 2021 awards ==
An awards ceremony on 13 December 2021 at Hanover Hall celebrated productions during 2020 and 2021. Winners were:

| Award | Winner | Notes |
|---|---|---|
| Production of the Year | Resilience, A Lockdown Theatre Response (Wow! Productions & Theatreworks) | |
| Outstanding Director | Lisa Warrington — The End of the Golden Weather (Wow! Productions) | |
| Performance Female Role | Kimberley Buchan — The Glass Menagerie (Globe Theatre) | |
| Performance Male Role | Matt Wilson — The End of the Golden Weather (Wow! Productions) | |
| Performance Ensemble | Sophie Graham & Alex Martyn — Lemons, Lemons, Lemons, Lemons, Lemons (Arcade Theatre Company) | |
| Community Theatre | Bittersweet: Unwrapping Cadbury’s (Talking House) | |
| Script/Narrative/Libretto | Michael Metzger — The Changing Shed | |
| Design & Technology | Charmian Smith — costumes for Murder in the Cathedral (Dunedin Medieval Society/Suitcase Theatre) | |
| Touring Production | Wild Dogs Under My Skirt | |
| Outstanding Contribution to Dunedin Theatre | Alister McDonald | |
| Outstanding Contribution to Dunedin Theatre | Simon O'Connor | |
