= Wow! Productions =

Theatre co-operative in Otago, New Zealand

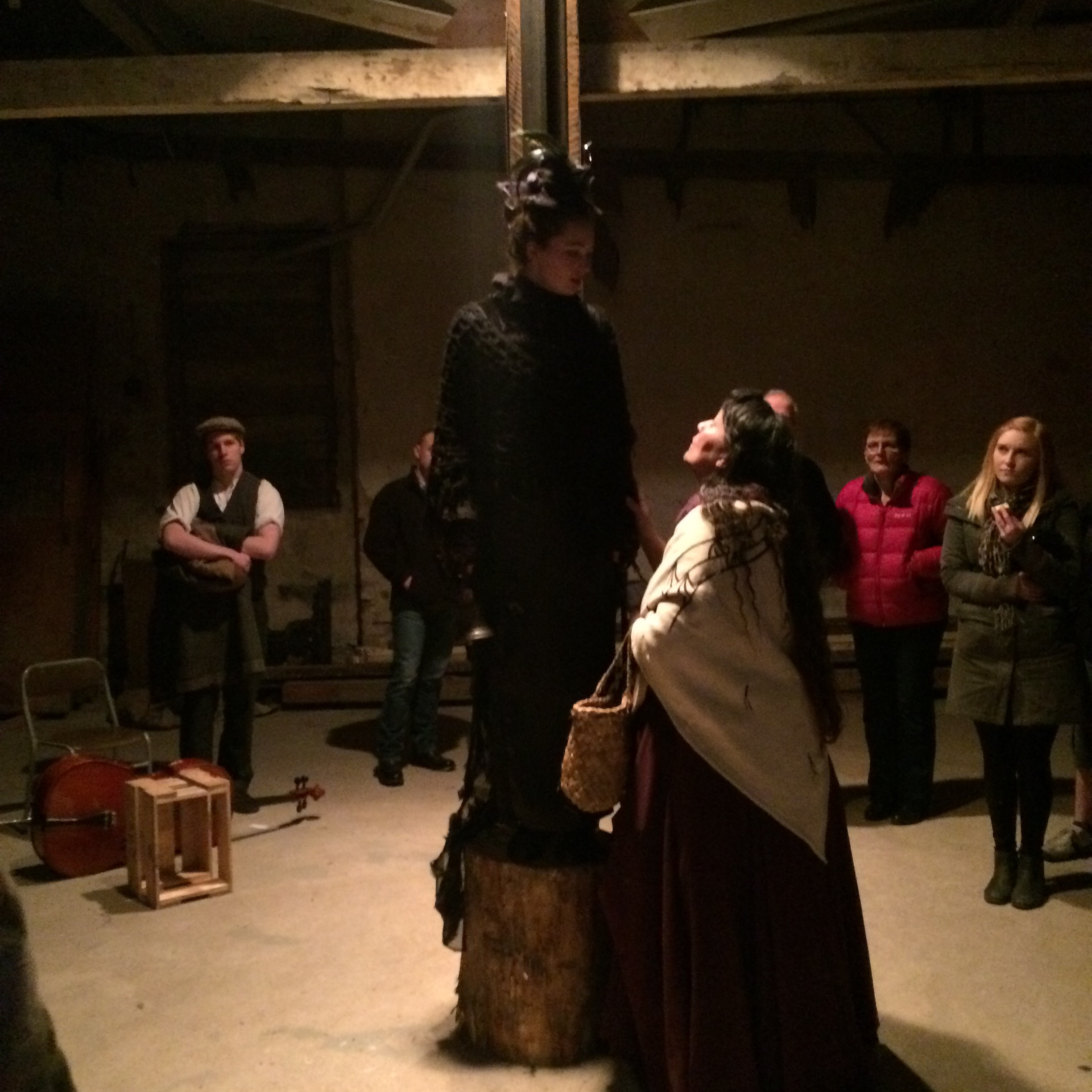
- Scene from Farley's Arcade, 2015, in the Athenaeum Basement
- Formation: 1996
- Type: Theatre group
- Location: Dunedin
- Members: Lisa Warrington, Cindy Diver, Martyn Roberts, Alison Finegan, Hilary Halba, Donna Agnew, Peter Chin, Courtney Drummond, Liesel Mitchell
- Website: https://wowproductions.nz/

Wow! Productions is a professional theatre co-operative based in Dunedin, New Zealand. It performs in non-theatre spaces, described by one reviewer as "weird and wonderful venues".

The co-operative began in 1996 and is run by a charitable trust, whose membership is Martyn Roberts, Cindy Diver, Alison Finigan, Hilary Halba, Lisa Warrington, Donna Agnew, Peter Chin, Courtney Drummond, and Liesel Mitchell. Productions have been mounted in pubs, clubs, art galleries, community halls, an accountancy office, a hairdressing salon, a cathedral crypt and a railway station, where the production included use of a real train.

Its 2020 production of New Zealand theatre classic The End of the Golden Weather was described as a "gift to the community".

== Production history ==
Date	Production	Author	Director	Venue
Sept 1996	Saving Grace (NZ)	Duncan Sarkies	David O'Donnell	Fortune Studio Theatre
Nov 1996	Dancing at Lughnasa(Ireland)	Brian Friel	Lisa Warrington	Transport Gallery, Otago Settlers Museum.
May 1997	Twelfth Night (England)	Shakespeare	Lisa Warrington	Allen Hall Theatre
October 1997	Unidentified Human Remains & the True Nature of Love (Canada)	Brad Fraser	Richard Huber	Manhattan Theatre space, Moray Place
November 1997	Tzigane (NZ)	John Vakidis	Hilary Norris	Otago Settlers Museum foyer
June-July 1998	Arcadia (England)	Tom Stoppard	Lisa Warrington	Dunedin Public Art Gallery (as part of Science Festival).
August 1998	Two Weeks With the Queen (Australia)	Mary Morris/ Morris Gleitzman	Hilary Norris	Mary Hopewell Theatre, Dunedin College of Education. Featuring Danny Still, Richard Carrington, Sara Connor, Julian Wilson, Gemma Carroll.
October 1998	Goldie (NZ)	Peter Hawes	David O'Donnell	Rehearsed reading in Dunedin Public Art Gallery during Goldie exhibition.
March 1999	One Flesh (NZ)	Fiona Samuel	Lisa Warrington	Fortune Theatre. Cast included Cindy Diver, Ronn Kjestrup, Richard Huber, Rachel Wallis, Patrick Davies, Sarah Entwistle, Edwin Wright.
June-July 1999	Whaea Kairau: Mother Hundred-Eater (NZ)	Apirana Taylor	Richard Huber	Otago Museum Special Exhibitions Gallery (in partnership with Kilimogo Productions). Cast included: Hilary Norris, Anya Tate-Manning, Patrick Davies, Julie Edwards, Rangimoana Taylor, Martin Phelan, Keri Hunter, Richard Huber, Maaka Pohatu.
February 2000	The Beauty Queen of Leenane (Ireland)	Martin McDonagh	Richard Huber	Fortune Studio Theatre, with Hilary Norris, Karin Reid, Danny Still and Ronn Kjestrup
May 2000	Horseplay (NZ)	Ken Duncum	Gary Henderson	Fortune Theatre, with Peter Hayden, Simon O'Connor, Hilary Norris and Sara Connor.
October 2000	An Unseasonable Fall of Snow (NZ)	Gary Henderson	Rachel More	Ruby in the Dust, Octagon, for the Inaugural Otago Festival of the Arts. With Lloyd Edwards, Matt Dwyer and Nick Dunbar.
September 2001	Collected Stories (USA)	Donald Margulies	Patrick Davies	Carnegie Gallery, Moray Place. With Hilary Norris and Mel Dodge.
September 2001	Autowalk (NZ)	Barbara Carey, Antony Partridge & Stayci Taylor	Directed by the devisors	Arc Cafē
Nov- Dec 2001	Blue Smoke (NZ)	Rawiri Paratene & Murray Lynch	Lisa Warrington	Ruby in the Dust, Octagon
September 2002	Hitting 50 (NZ)	Sue McCauley	Tony McCaffrey	Court 2 Christchurch & Fortune Studio Theatre.
April-May 2004	Miss Julie (Sweden/NZ)	August Strindberg, translation by Ted Nye	Hilary Norris	Playhouse Theatre Dunedin
Sept-Oct 2004	Cherish (NZ)	Ken Duncum	Lisa Warrington	Dunedin Public Art Gallery, for Otago Festival of the Arts.
Sept–Oct 2006	Lines of Fire (NZ)	Gary Henderson	Lisa Warrington	Dunedin Railway Station, for Otago Festival of the Arts & 10th anniversary WOW! celebration. Featuring Barbara Carey, Sara Connor-Best, Cindy Diver, Hilary Halba, Sarah McDougall.
December 2007	Hairway to Heaven (NZ)	Sarah McDougall	Lisa Warrington	Otago Polytechnic Hairdressing salon, with Barbara Power (a trained hairdresser), Sara Georgie Tunoka, Julie Edwards, Simon O'Connor and Phoebe Smith.
March 2008	Tracey and Traci (NZ)	Hilary Halba, Barbara Power, Clare Adams	Clare Adams	Polson Higgs Accountancy Offices
October 2008	The Cape (NZ)	Vivienne Plumb	Simon O'Connor	Playhouse Theatre, as part of Otago Festival of the Arts. Producer Clare Adams. Cast James Lee, Luke Agnew, Matt Johl, Johnny Appleby.
Sept/Oct 2009	Glorious (NZ)	Richard Huber	Patrick Davies	Fortune Theatre Studio
October 2010	Backwards in High Heels (NZ)	Stuart Hoar	Richard Huber	Sundry community halls around Dunedin for the Otago Festival of the Arts, including St Martins Hall, Northeast Valley; Waitati Community Hall, St Mary's Church Hall, Mosgiel; Burns Hall, First Church; Port Chalmers Town Hall; Coronation Hall, Portobello; and Maori Hill Community Centre. Choreographed by Karyn Taylor, cast Dunedin actors Patrick Davies, Anna Henare and Clare Adams.
March 2014	Milk Milk Lemonade (USA)	Joshua Conkel	Anna Henare & Patrick Davies	St Paul’s Cathedral Crypt, Octagon. Part of the 2014 Dunedin Fringe Festival.
28 Aug/6 Sept 2015	Farley’s Arcade: The Wildest Place in Town (NZ)	Richard Huber & others	Richard Huber/Lisa Warrington	Sundry spaces in the Athenaeum Building, Octagon. Won 2015 Promotion of the Year at the Dunedin Theatre Awards.
Jan 2018 and ongoing	Journey of the Jura (NZ)	Emily Duncan (dramaturg, with cast)	Anya Tate-Manning	Held in ‘Across the Ocean Waves’ exhibit at Toitu
April to Nov 2019	Party with the Aunties	Erina Daniels (devised with the cast)	Erina Daniels	Various venues in Paekakariki, Wellington, Feilding, Nelson, Thames, Paeroa, New Plymouth, Christchurch and Dunedin. "Skilful, heartwarming entertainment".
July 2019	The Flick	Annie Baker	Lara Macgregor	At Allen Hall Theatre
Nov 2020	The End of the Golden Weather (NZ)	Bruce Mason	Lisa Warrington	Starring Matt Wilson. At various locations around Dunedin, Oamaru, Mosgiel, Waitati
