= Daniel Belton =

New Zealand dancer, choreographer, filmmaker and multi-media arts practitioner

- Born: 1970 (age 54–55); Nelson, New Zealand
- Occupations: Dancer; choreographer; film-maker
- Spouse: Donnine Harrison
- Awards: Creative New Zealand Choreographic Fellowship (2009); Arts Foundation of New Zealand Laureate (2015)

Daniel Alexander Belton (born 1970) is a New Zealand dancer, choreographer and film-maker based in Dunedin. He is the co-founder and artistic director of Good Company Arts (GCA). He is an Arts Foundation of New Zealand Laureate. His works have been shown in America, Europe, South America, Asia and the Pacific.

== Early life and education ==
Belton was born in Nelson in 1970. He was educated at Nelson College from 1983 to 1987, and was a prefect in his final year there. Belton graduated from the New Zealand School of Dance in 1990. He then toured overseas as a dancer with the Douglas Wright Dance Company, with his wife and artistic partner, dancer Donnine Harrison. They remained in Europe for seven years, working with a number of prestigious companies, including Arc Dance Company and the Royal Opera House Covent Garden. They returned to New Zealand in 1997.

== Work ==
Belton has choreographed a number of acclaimed dance works, including Leaf (1998), Concertina (1999) and Soundings (2000). He has also created a number of experimental filmed dance works, such as Axis: Anatomy of Space (2017), which featured dancers from the Royal New Zealand Ballet, and had its world premiere in the Planetarium of the Otago Museum (Dunedin). Belton's 2014 work Satellite was commissioned by the Royal New Zealand Ballet; dancers performed while holding round discs related to kinetic sculptures by sonic artist Jim Murphy. The ideas from Satellite were developed further in Axis, performed in the planetarium at the Otago Museum in 2017 as part of the Matariki Festival. Reviewer Hahna Briggs wrote "The film shows the infiniteness of the universe through the simultaneous imploding and exploding of bodies in space and time. In addition, the interconnectedness of everything is demonstrated in the dance through showing similar and repeating patterns that occur in space, sound, water and bodies." Axis has subsequently been screened (as an Official Selection) in Festivals in Singapore, Colombia, Korea, Hong Kong, Auckland and San Francisco.

Belton's first major collaborative work was Soundings, produced for the Otago Festival in 2000, and employing 30 people, including actors Simon O'Connor and Richard Huber, dancers Donnine Harrison, Tom Ward, Simon Ellis, Bronwyn Judge, Melanie Hamilton, Kristian Larsen, Kelly Nash, designers and technicians. Costumes were by leading NZ fashion designer Tanya Carlson. Belton directed, choreographed and danced in the piece.

OneOne is a 35-minute video piece with video mapping by Belton. Belton reworks the piece for each setting. A performance at the 2016 Light Nelson event featured music recorded by Richard Nunns using taonga pūoro (traditional Māori musical instruments), sound effects recorded from the Waitaki region and dance by Janessa Duffy of the Sydney Dance Company.

His most recent collaborative work, still in progress, is Ad Parnassum - purapurawhetū, made with composer Dame Gillian Karawe Whitehead, along with the New Zealand String Quartet and the use of Taonga Pūoro. It is scheduled to have its digital premiere in December 2021.

As a film maker, Belton has created a number of short films which have been premiered in sundry film festivals, under the Good Company Arts banner. These include Matchbox (2008), Ato-Mick (2010) and Ato-Miss (2012), amongst others. Ato-Mick, for example, was selected for Official Competition in: Linoleum 2010 International Festival of Contemporary Animation and Media Art, Moscow, Russia. It was a finalist in the Roma Independent Film Festival Awards 2011, Rome, Italy.

== Awards and honours ==
In 2004 Belton was based at the University of Otago as the Creative New Zealand choreographic research resident, and in 2008 the media artist in residence at Massey University. Also in 2008, Belton received the prize for "most innovative work" for After Durer at the XV Festival Internazionale di Videodanza, at the Museo Madre, in Naples.

In 2009, Belton received the largest choreographic award available in New Zealand, the Creative New Zealand Choreographic Fellowship, worth $65,000. Making the award, the chair of the Arts Board of Creative New Zealand, Alan Sorrell, said "Daniel Belton is one of New Zealand’s leading dance film choreographers whose work is characterised by innovation and a multi-disciplinary approach...he is internationally renowned in the dance film genre."

Belton was choreographic fellow of the Arts Council of New Zealand in 2010.

Belton was a New Zealand Arts Foundation laureate in 2015. In 2017, at the World Stage Design Awards, Taipei, Taiwan, he received a professional designer/projection and multi-media design bronze award, for OneOne.

In 2019 Daniel and Good Company Arts were awarded first place in the Sino x Niio Illumination Art Prize, Hong Kong, also for OneOne. In her review of Belton's work, Catherine Pattison describes him as one of only two New Zealand dance film-makers to make it on the international stage (the other being Shona McCullagh).
