= Lara Macgregor =

Actor, director and dramaturg in New Zealand

Lara Macgregor is an actress, director, dramaturg, photographer and performance coach in New Zealand.

== Education ==
Macgregor studied acting in New York City with Uta Hagen, Anthony Abeson and Tony Greco and subsequently worked for ten years as an actor in the U.S.

She holds a Post-Graduate Diploma in Directing from The National Institute of Dramatic Art (NIDA) in Sydney and has directed over 40 productions throughout America, Australia and New Zealand.

== Career ==
=== Directing ===
In 2009, Macgregor was appointed Associate Artistic Director at the Court Theatre in Christchurch, New Zealand. She directed a number of plays at The Forge, as the Court's studio theatre was known for a time, including (in 2009) Dave Armstrong's The Tutor (a New Zealand comedy, and the first production at The Forge) and Dean Parker's The Perfumed Garden (2010).

In 2010, she was appointed Artistic Director at the Fortune Theatre in Dunedin, a position she held until late 2015. Since that year, she has worked as a freelance director at the Court Theatre, and for Wow! Productions in Dunedin, for whom she directed Annie Baker's Pulitzer prize-winning play The Flick.

Macgregor's productions at the Fortune Theatre include:

- God of Carnage by Yasmina Reza (2011)
- Five Women Wearing the Same Dress by Alan Ball (2011). Also at Court Theatre.
- The Truth Game by Simon Cunliffe - a New Zealand premiere (2011)
- A Short Cut To Happiness by Roger Hall (2011)
- Red by John Logan (2012)
- In the Next Room (or The Vibrator Play)) by Sarah Ruhl (2012)
- Heroes by Gerald Sibleyras, translated by Tom Stoppard (2012)
- Play by Samuel Beckett (2012)
- Love, Loss and What I Wore by Nora Ephron and Delia Ephron (2013)
- Tribes by Nina Raine (2013)
- Book Ends by Roger Hall (2014)
- The Caretaker by Harold Pinter (2014)
- Ladies' Night by Anthony McCarten and Stephen Sinclair (2015)
- Punk Rock by Simon Stephens (2015)
- Winston's Birthday by Paul Baker (2016) (Also at Court Theatre)

For the Court Theatre, at The Forge, Macgregor has directed:

- Poe by Jeff Clark (2009) (a.k.a. A True Account of the Regrettable Circumstances and Mysterious Demise of Edgar Allan Poe.)
- My Name Is Rachel Corrie by Alan Rickman and Katherine Viner (2009)
- The Tutor by Dave Armstrong (2009). Also at Fortune Theatre.
- The Perfumed Garden by Dean Parker (2010)
- On the Rocks by Amy Rosenthal (2010)
- Saving Grace by Duncan Sarkies (2010)

At Court Theatre MainStage, Macgregor has directed:

- The Curious Incident of the Dog in the Night-Time by Simon Stephens (2017)
- Venus in Fur by David Ives (2017)
- Elling by Simon Bent (2019)

At Circa Theatre, Wellington, she had directed:

- Bone by John Donnelly (2008)

=== Acting ===
Macgregor has played leading roles in many productions at the Court Theatre, including Lady Macbeth in Macbeth (2016), Thilde Forster in Michelanne Forster's Don't Mention Casablanca (2010), When the Rain Stops Falling by Andrew Bovell (2014) - all three directed by Ross Gumbley; M'Lynn in Steel Magnolias (2017, director Gregory Cooper), Annie Wilkes in Misery (2018, director Dan Bain) and Fran in Things I Know To Be True by Andrew Bovell (2021, director Shane Bosher). The latter play had a season at Circa Theatre in Wellington, where Macgregor has also appeared in Di and Viv and Rose by Amelia Bullmore (2020, directed by Stephanie McKellar-Smith) and Burn Her by Sam Brooks (2019, directed by Katherine McRae). She played Rosemary in John Patrick Shanley's Outside Mullingar (2015, Fortune Theatre, director Lisa Warrington).

She has appeared in a number of film and TV shows, including Clickbait (Netflix, 2021), an eight-part thriller miniseries, and This Town (2020).

== Awards and nominations ==
- Best Director for Play (Beckett) 2012, Dunedin Theatre Awards
- Outstanding Contribution of the Year (2015), Dunedin Theatre Awards
- Director of the Year, Punk Rock (2015), Dunedin Theatre Awards Wilkes
- Director of the Year, The Flick (2019), Dunedin Theatre Awards
