= David O'Donnell (actor-director) =

New Zealand theatre academic and theatre director (1956- )

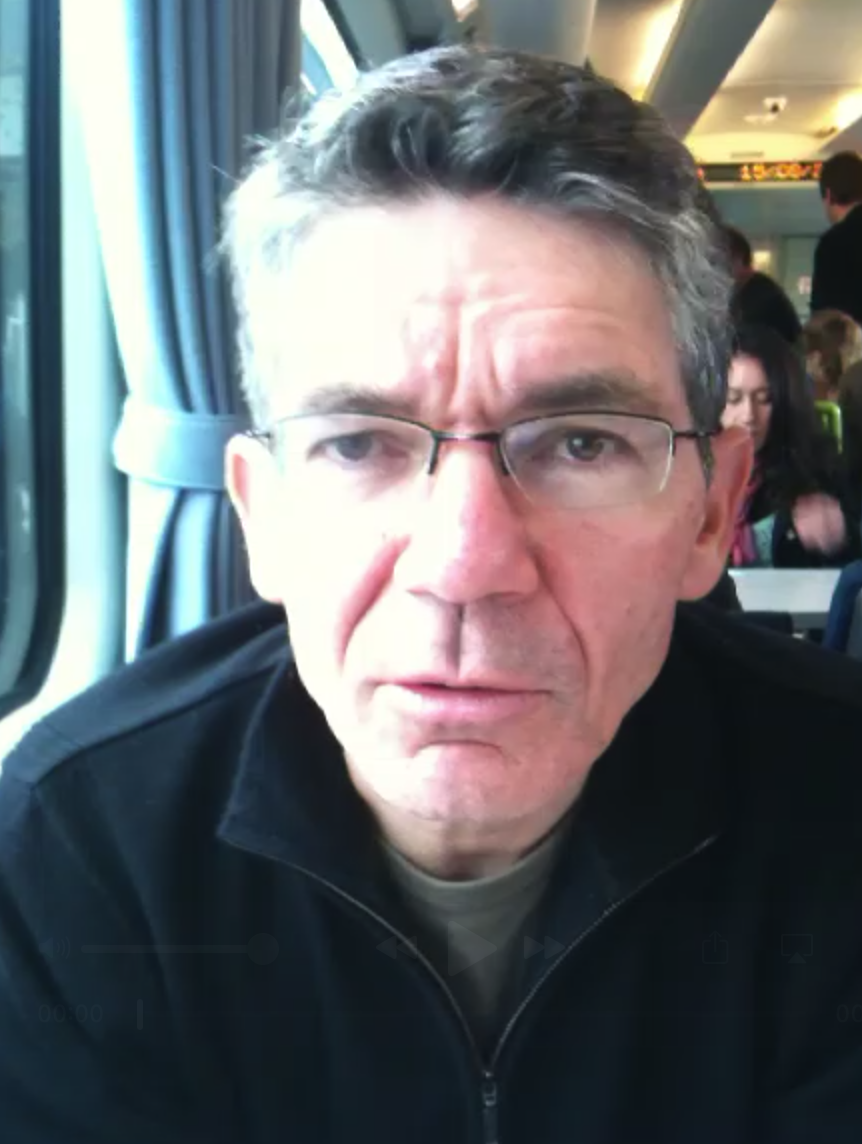
David O'Donnell

David John O'Donnell is a New Zealand theatre director, actor, and academic based in Wellington, New Zealand. He taught at Victoria University of Wellington from 1999 to 2023, became a full professor in 2020 and was made Emeritus Professor in 2025.

== Early life and education ==
O'Donnell has a diploma in Acting from Toi Whakaari/New Zealand Drama School (1979), where his contemporaries included Lani Tupu and Simon Phillips. He is a graduate of both Victoria University of Wellington and the University of Otago, where he was awarded a Postgraduate Diploma in Arts (PGrad Dip) and an MA. His 1999 Master's thesis was titled Re-staging history: historiographic drama from New Zealand and Australia.

== Work ==
O'Donnell began his academic career as an assistant lecturer in Theatre Studies at Allen Hall, Otago University (1992 -1998), and taught at Victoria University of Wellington from 1999 to 2023, where he is (since 2025) an Emeritus Professor in the School of English, Film, Theatre, Media Studies and Art History. He has won two Excellence in Teaching Awards.

O'Donnell co-edited the 2007 book Performing Aotearoa: New Zealand Theatre and Drama in an Age of Transition with Marc Maufort. In 2017, he co-authored Floating Islanders: Pasifika Theatre in Aotearoa with Lisa Warrington. He co-authored Playmarket 40: 40 Years of Playwriting in New Zealand in 2013 with Laurie Atkinson. He co-edited the book Indigeneity on the Oceanic Stage: Intimations of the Local in a Globalised World (2024) with Marc Maufort, and in 2025 co-edited Acting in Aotearoa (2025) with Hilary Halba.

He has written and published extensively on aspects of theatre and performance in New Zealand and the Pacific, including articles, book chapters, conference papers and production reviews.

He has been the editor of the Playmarket New Zealand Play Series since 2010, editing to date 17 play collections and theatre books.

He is the regional managing editor for New Zealand of The Theatre Times, a website which provides worldwide theatre news.

He has directed many plays, with a strong focus on Shakespeare and works from New Zealand, both professionally and with student performers. Shakespeare productions include several outdoor Summer Shakespeare productions for Victoria University of Wellington, including A Midsummer Night's Dream (1991), Richard III (featuring Jonathan Hendry in the title role) in 1998 and Hamlet, featuring a female 'hero' (Stevie Hancox-Monk) in 2019. He had previously directed Hamlet in 2005 at Dunedin's Fortune Theatre, and has also directed the Henry VI trilogy for Toi Whakaari/NZ Drama School at Te Whaea in 2006. Plays by New Zealand writers he has directed include Take Me Home Mr by William Walker (2002), Te Karakia by Albert Belz (2009), Heat by Lynda Chanwai-Earle (2010), The Great Gatsby adapted by Ken Duncum Circa Theatre 2010, and Hole by Lynda Chanwai-Earle (2020), amongst a number of others. (See Awards below for more.)

As an actor, he has worked professionally for Downstage (Wellington), Centrepoint (Palmerston North) and Wow! Productions (Dunedin) amongst other companies.

== Awards ==
- 2004: Best director for Albert Speer by David Edgar, Chapman Tripp Theatre Awards
- 2006: Production of the Year for Yours Truly by Albert Belz, Chapman Tripp Theatre Awards
- Nominated for the following Chapman Tripp Theatre Awards: The Sojourns of Boy by Jo Randerson (best director, best production and most original production 1999); Irish Annals of Aotearoa by Simon O'Connor (best director, best production and most original production, 2001); Yours Truly by Albert Belz (best director, 2006); Charles Darwin: Collapsing Creation by Arthur Meek (best director, 2009); West End Girls by Ken Duncum (best director, 2012)
- Nominated for Best Director (with Lori Leigh) for Hamlet, Wellington Theatre Awards, 2019.
- 2015: Po' Okela Award from the Hawai’i State Theatre Council, for his direction of Victor Rodger’s My Name is Gary Cooper at Kumu Kahua Theater, Honolulu.
- 2016: Created Life Member, Australasian Association for Theatre, Drama and Performance Studies.
- 2018: Rob Jordan Book Prize, awarded by the Australasian Association for Theatre, Drama and Performance Studies, for Floating Islanders (joint award with Lisa Warrington).
- 2023: Mayoral Award for Significant Contribution to Theatre, Wellington Theatre Awards 2023.
