= University of Otago School of Performing Arts =

Part of a university in New Zealand

Coordinates: 45°52′2.92″S 170°31′13.43″E

The University of Otago School of Performing Arts, or Te Kāhui Tau, is part of the University of Otago's Division of Humanities. The school is based in Dunedin, New Zealand. It is ranked in the world's top-200 universities for the performing arts.

The School of Performing Arts consists of four programmes:

- Music
- Theatre
- Dance
- Performing Arts

These were originally individual departments but were merged into the one school in 2018. The school is composed of 23 academic staff members. The school awards degrees ranging from Bachelor of Arts (BA) to Doctor of Philosophy (PhD).

Alongside teaching and research in the above fields students are also offered the opportunity to demonstrate their practical skills at lunchtime performances at Marama Hall (Music) and Allen Hall (Theatre, Dance, Performing Arts). Marama Hall was formerly the Medical Students Training Corps for the Otago Medical School and inside the hall is a board that lists all medical personnel who served aboard the New Zealand Hospital Ships during World War One. Allen Hall was constructed in 1914 as the university’s first Student Union building which was named after former university chancellor Hon. Sir James Allen, who headed a committee for the hall’s construction.
