= Heavenly Creatures =

1994 film by Peter Jackson

- Theatrical release poster
- Directed by: Peter Jackson
- Screenplay by: Frances Walsh; Peter Jackson
- Produced by: Jim Booth
- Starring: Melanie Lynskey; Kate Winslet; Sarah Peirse; Diana Kent; Clive Merrison; Simon O'Connor
- Cinematography: Alun Bollinger
- Edited by: Jamie Selkirk
- Music by: Peter Dasent
- Production companies: WingNut Films; Fontana Productions; New Zealand Film Commission
- Distributed by: Miramax International
- Release date: 14 October 1994
- Running time: 99 minutes 109 minutes (director's cut)
- Country: New Zealand
- Language: English
- Budget: $5 million
- Box office: $5.4 million

Heavenly Creatures is a 1994 New Zealand biographical crime drama film directed by Peter Jackson, from a screenplay he co-wrote with his partner, Fran Walsh. It stars Melanie Lynskey and Kate Winslet in their feature film debuts, with Sarah Peirse, Diana Kent, Clive Merrison, and Simon O'Connor in supporting roles.

Based on the notorious Parker–Hulme murder case, Heavenly Creatures examines the relationship between two teenage girls—Pauline Parker and Juliet Hulme—which culminates in the premeditated killing of Parker's mother. The story's events span the period from the girls' first meeting in 1952 to the carrying out of the crime, which took place in Christchurch, New Zealand on 22 June 1954.

Heavenly Creatures debuted at the Venice Film Festival in September 1994, where it was awarded the Silver Lion. It went on to receive widespread critical acclaim, becoming one of the best-received films of that year. Reviewers praised most aspects of the production, with particular attention given to the work of the previously unknown Lynskey and Winslet, as well as Jackson's directing. The film received an Oscar nomination for Best Original Screenplay in 1995.

== Plot ==
In 1952 Christchurch, Juliet Hulme, an affluent 13-year-old English girl, transfers to a new school and befriends Pauline Parker, a 14-year-old girl from a working-class family. Bonding over a shared history of severe childhood disease and isolating hospitalisations, they develop an intense friendship. Pauline admires Juliet's outspoken arrogance and beauty.

Unlike the peaceful intellectual life Juliet shares with her family, Pauline's relationship with her mother, Honora, is hostile, and the two fight constantly. Pauline spends most of her time at the Hulmes', where she feels accepted.

Together, Juliet and Pauline paint, write stories, make figurines, and eventually create a fantasy kingdom called Borovnia. It is the setting of the adventure novels they write together, which they hope to have published and made into films in Hollywood. Over time, it begins to be as real to them as the real world. Juliet introduces Pauline to the idea of "the Fourth World", a Heaven without Christians where music and art are celebrated. Juliet believes she will go there when she dies.

During a day trip to Port Levy, Juliet's parents announce their plan to go on a trip together, leaving Juliet by herself. Hysterical at the prospect of being left alone, Juliet experiences the Fourth World for the first time, perceiving it as a land where all is beautiful and she is safe. She asks Pauline to come with her, and this world also becomes visible to Pauline. This shared spiritual vision confirms their Fourth World belief and begins to affect their perception of events in the everyday world.

When Juliet is diagnosed with tuberculosis and sent to a clinic, she and Pauline begin writing to each other, not only as themselves but in the roles of the royal couple of Borovnia. During this time, Pauline has a sexual relationship with a lodger, making Juliet jealous. Their fantasy life becomes a useful escape from the real world, and the two engage in increasingly violent, even murderous, fantasies about people who oppress them. After Juliet is released from the clinic, their relationship intensifies. Wary of her attachment to Pauline, Juliet's father speaks to Pauline's parents, who take her to a doctor. The doctor suspects that Pauline is homosexual and uses it to explain her dramatic weight loss and increasing anger at her mother.

Juliet's parents announce their intention to divorce and leave Christchurch, with Juliet to stay with a relative in South Africa. Increasingly distraught at the thought of separation, the two girls plan to run away together. When that plan becomes impossible, the two share a bathtub and talk about murdering Pauline's mother, seeing her as the primary obstacle to their being together.

The two girls spend the last three weeks together at Juliet's house. At the end of that time, Pauline returns home, and the two finalise plans for the murder. Honora plans a trip for the three of them to Victoria Park. After having tea, the three walk on a path down a steep hillside. When Honora bends over to pick up a pink charm the girls have deliberately dropped, Juliet and Pauline bludgeon her to death with a broken piece of brick hidden in an old stocking.

A textual epilogue reveals that Pauline and Juliet were arrested shortly after the murder, sentenced to five years in prison, as they were too young to face the death penalty, and released separately in 1959 on the condition that they never see each other again.

== Cast ==
- Melanie Lynskey as Pauline Parker
- Kate Winslet as Juliet Hulme
- Sarah Peirse as Honora Parker
- Diana Kent as Hilda Hulme
- Clive Merrison as Dr. Henry Hulme
- Simon O'Connor as Herbert Rieper
- Jed Brophy as John
- Peter Elliott as Bill Perry
- Gilbert Goldie as Dr. Bennett
- Elizabeth Moody as Miss Waller

== Production ==
=== Development ===
Fran Walsh suggested to Peter Jackson (who was noted for horror-comedy films) that they write a film about the notorious Parker–Hulme murder. Jackson took the idea to his long-time collaborator, producer Jim Booth (who died after filming). The three filmmakers decided that the film should tell the story of the friendship between the two girls rather than focus on the murder and trial. "The friendship was for the most part a rich and rewarding one, and we tried to honour that in the film. It was our intention to make a film about a friendship that went terribly wrong," said Peter Jackson.

Walsh had been interested in the case since her early childhood. "I first came across it in the late Sixties when I was ten years old. The Sunday Times devoted two whole pages to the story with an accompanying illustration of the two girls. I was struck by the description of the dark and mysterious friendship that existed between them—by the uniqueness of the world the two girls had created for themselves."

Jackson and Walsh researched the story by reading contemporaneous newspaper accounts of the trial. They decided that the sensational aspects of the case that so titillated newspaper readers in 1954 were far removed from the story that Jackson and Walsh wished to tell. "In the 1950s, Pauline Parker and Juliet Hulme were branded as possibly the most evil people on earth. What they had done seemed without rational explanation, and people could only assume that there was something terribly wrong with their minds," states Jackson. To bring a more humane version of events to the screen, the filmmakers undertook a nationwide search for people who had had close involvement with Pauline Parker and Juliet Hulme forty years earlier. This included tracing and interviewing seventeen of their former classmates and teachers from Christchurch Girls' High School. In addition, Jackson and Walsh spoke to neighbours, family friends, colleagues, police officers, lawyers and psychologists. Jackson and Walsh also read Pauline's diary, in which she made daily entries documenting her friendship with Juliet Hulme and events throughout their relationship. From the diary entries, Jackson and Walsh perceived that Pauline and Juliet were intelligent, imaginative, outcast young women who possessed a wicked and somewhat irreverent sense of humour. In the film all of Pauline's voice-overs are excerpts from her journal entries.

=== Casting ===
The role of Pauline was cast after Walsh scouted schools all over New Zealand to find a Pauline 'look-alike'. She had trouble finding an actress who resembled Pauline and had acting talent before discovering Melanie Lynskey. Kate Winslet was among 175 girls to audition for the film and was cast after impressing Jackson with the intensity she brought to her part. The girls were both so absorbed by their roles that they kept on acting as Pauline and Juliet after the filming was done, as is described on Jackson's website.

=== Principal photography ===
The entire film was shot on location in Christchurch in 1993. Jackson has been quoted as saying "Heavenly Creatures is based on a true story, and as such I felt it important to shoot the movie on locations where the actual events took place."

=== Post-production ===
The visual effects in the film were handled by the then newly created Weta Digital. The girls' fantasy life, and the ‘Borovnian’ extras (the characters the girls made up) were supervised by Richard Taylor while the digital effects were supervised by George Port. Taylor and his team constructed more than 70 full-sized latex costumes to represent the Borovnian crowds—plasticine figures that inhabit Pauline and Juliet's magical fantasy world. Heavenly Creatures contains more than thirty shots that were digitally manipulated, ranging from the morphing garden of the ‘Fourth World’ to castles in fields and the sequences with "Orson Welles" (played by Jean Guérin).

=== Music ===
1. "Just a Closer Walk with Thee" – Choirs of Burnside High School, Cashmere High School, Hagley Community College, Villa Maria College
2. "Be My Love" – written by Nicholas Brodszky, Sammy Cahn; performed by Mario Lanza
3. "The Donkey Serenade" – performed by Mario Lanza
4. "(How Much Is) That Doggie in the Window?" – Bob Merrill; performed by the actors
5. "Funiculì, Funiculà" – written by Luigi Denza, Peppino Turco; performed by Mario Lanza
6. "E lucevan le stelle" from Tosca by Giacomo Puccini; performed by Peter Dvorský
7. "The Loveliest Night of the Year" – performed by Mario Lanza
8. "Sono Andati" from La Bohème by Giacomo Puccini; performed by Kate Winslet
9. "The Humming Chorus" from Madama Butterfly by Giacomo Puccini – performed by the Hungarian State Opera
10. "You'll Never Walk Alone" – performed by Mario Lanza

== Reception ==
=== Critical response ===
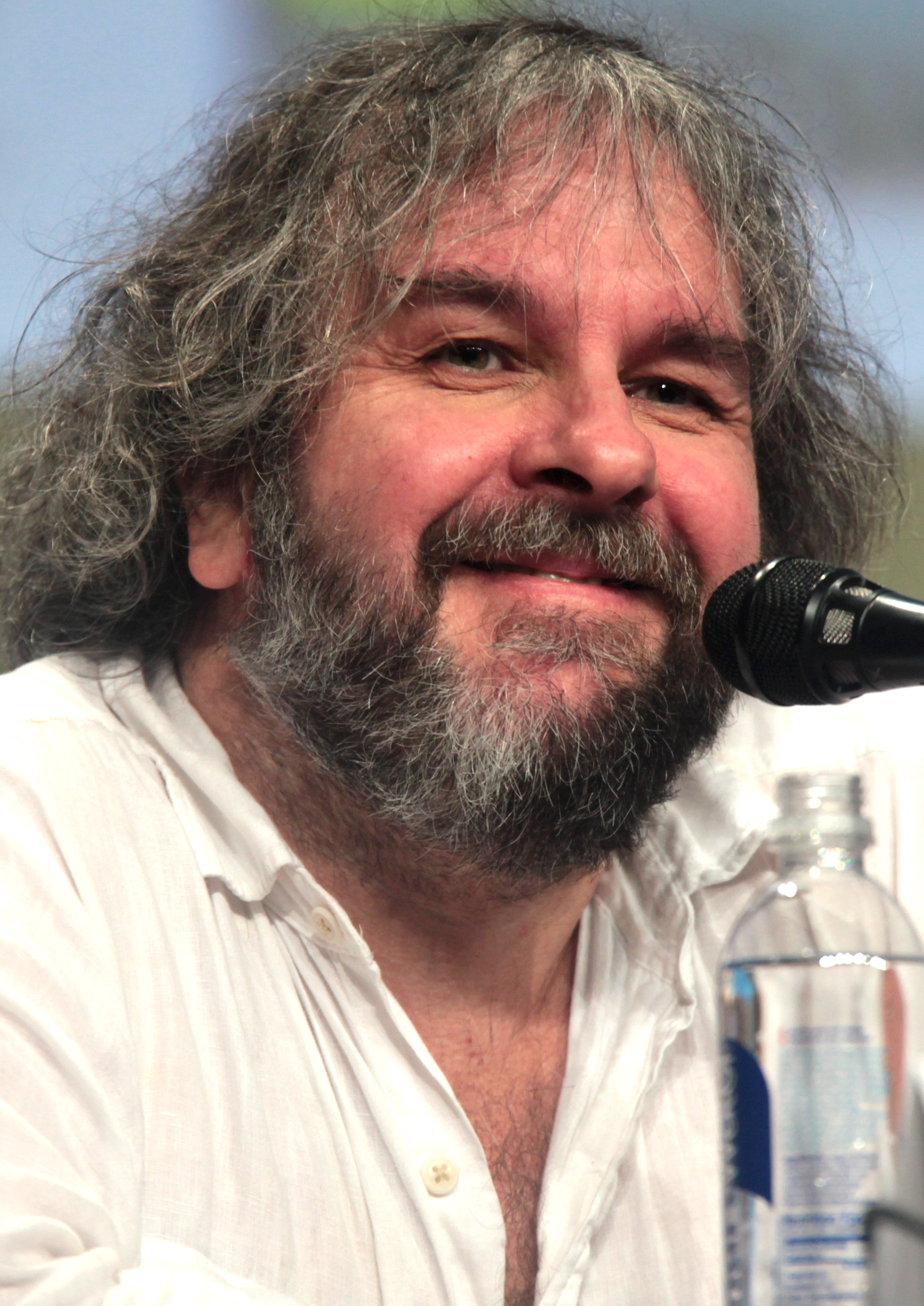
Peter Jackson, pictured in 2014

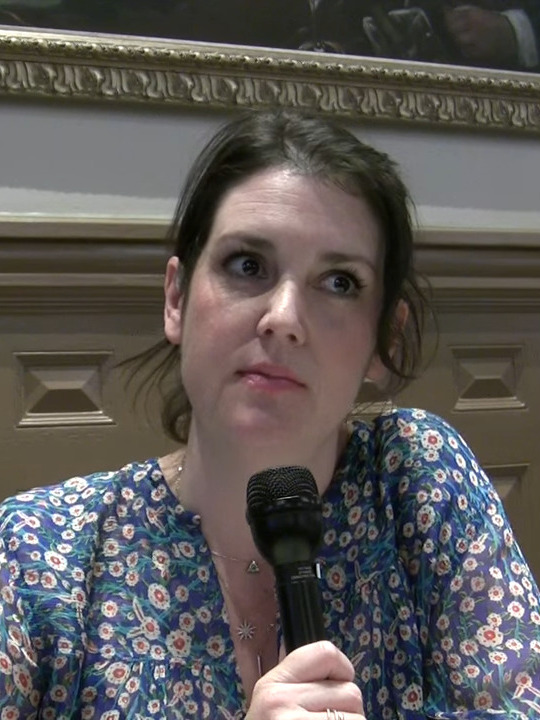
Melanie Lynskey, pictured in 2016

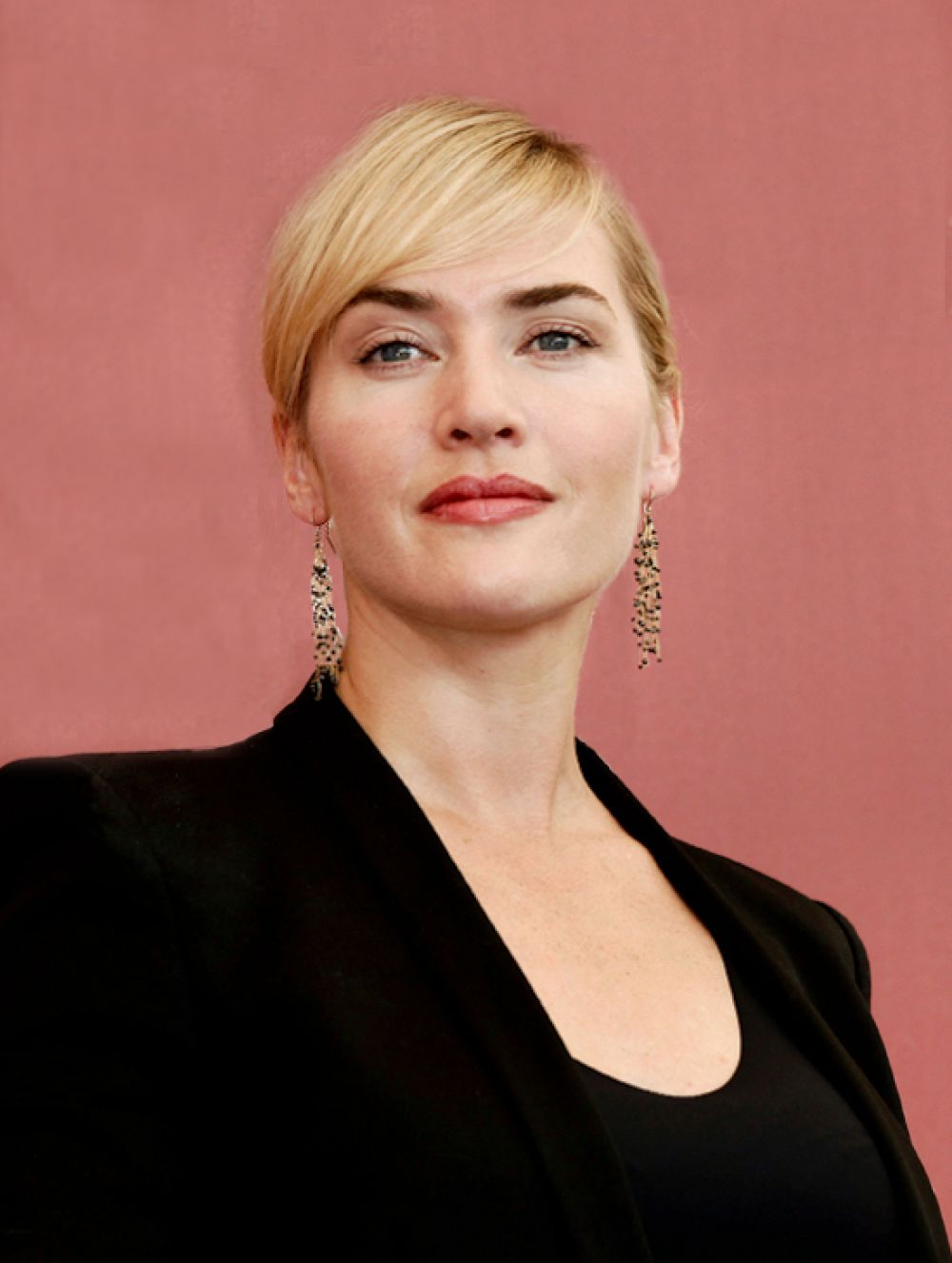
Peter Jackson's direction, as well as Melanie Lynskey and Kate Winslet's performances (both in their feature film debuts), received praise. (Winslet, pictured in 2011)

Heavenly Creatures garnered wide critical praise, in particular for its direction, screenplay and lead performances. On the review aggregator website Rotten Tomatoes, the film holds an approval rating of 95% based on 108 reviews, with an average rating of 8.2/10. The website's critics consensus reads, "Dark, stylish, and captivating, Heavenly Creatures signals both the auspicious debut of Kate Winslet and the arrival of Peter Jackson as more than just a cult director." Metacritic, which uses a weighted average, assigned the film a score of 86 out of 100, based on 31 critics, indicating "universal acclaim"..

Nick Hyman, writing for Metacritic, thought that 1994's Oscar-winning Forrest Gump was equally matched by "Memorable Film(s) Not Nominated for Best Picture", including Heavenly Creatures, of which Hyman said, "Peter Jackson's masterful blend of fantastical visions and a heartbreaking real-life murder tragedy has arguably never been topped."

Owen Gleiberman, writing for Entertainment Weekly, gave the film a B+ and said, "Set in the early '50s, in the New Zealand village of Christchurch, this ripe hallucination of a movie – a rhapsody in purple – has been photographed in sun-drenched candy colour that lends it the surreal clarity of a dream... There's something bracing about the way that Heavenly Creatures serves up its heroines' fantasies with literal-minded brute force." Gleiberman complains that Jackson never quite explains "why the two girls have metamorphosed into the '50s teenybop answer to Leopold and Loeb," yet concludes, "Still, if the pleasures of Heavenly Creatures remain defiantly on the surface, on that level the movie is a dazzler."

=== Box office ===
Heavenly Creatures had a limited box office success but performed admirably in various countries, including the United States, where it grossed a total of $3,049,135 during its limited run in 57 theatres; it grossed $5,438,120 worldwide. In the US it opened on two screens in New York City (Angelika Film Center and Lincoln Plaza) and had the biggest per-screen gross of the weekend with an average of $15,796, grossing $41,323 in its opening 5 days.

=== Accolades ===
Heavenly Creatures was an Academy Award nominee in 1994 for Best Original Screenplay and won for Best British Actress at the 1st Empire Awards. It featured in a number of international film festivals, and received very favourable reviews worldwide.

Miramax International believed that reception at the Cannes Film Festival would make the film more appealing than it already was.

The film made top ten of the year lists in Time, The Guardian, The Sydney Morning Herald, and The New Zealand Herald. It appears in the book 1001 Movies You Must See Before You Die.

The film also did exceptionally well at the 1995 New Zealand Film and Television Awards, being nominated for 10 awards and winning nine.

==== Year-end lists ====
- 3rd – Kevin Thomas, Los Angeles Times
- 5th – Kenneth Turan, Los Angeles Times
- 5th – Yardena Arar, Los Angeles Daily News
- 9th – Desson Howe, The Washington Post
- 9th – Glenn Lovell, San Jose Mercury News
- Top 10 (listed alphabetically, not ranked) – Matt Zoller Seitz, Dallas Observer
- Top 10 (listed alphabetically, not ranked) – Eleanor Ringel, The Atlanta Journal-Constitution
- Top 10 (listed alphabetically, not ranked) – Steve Murray, The Atlanta Journal-Constitution
- Top 10 (listed alphabetically, not ranked) – Bob Ross, The Tampa Tribune
- Top 10 (not ranked) – Betsy Pickle, Knoxville News-Sentinel
- Best of the year (not ranked) – Jeffrey Lyons, Sneak Previews
- Honorable mention – Michael Mills, The Palm Beach Post
- Honorable mention – Michael MacCambridge, Austin American-Statesman
- Honorable mention – Jeff Simon, The Buffalo News

==== Awards ====
Institution	Year	Category	Recipient(s)	Result	Ref.
Academy Awards	1995	Best Original Screenplay	Peter Jackson; Fran Walsh	Nominated	
Chicago Film Critics Association	1995	Best Foreign Film	Heavenly Creatures	Nominated	
Chicago International Film Festival	1994	Best Feature	Peter Jackson	Nominated	
Empire Awards	1996	Best British Actress	Kate Winslet	Won	
Festival international du film fantastique de Gérardmer	1995	Grand Prize	Peter Jackson	Won	
London Film Critics' Circle	1996	Director of the Year	Peter Jackson	Won	
London Film Critics' Circle	1996	British Actress of the Year	Kate Winslet	Won	
London Film Critics' Circle	1996	Film of the Year	Heavenly Creatures	Nominated	
Los Angeles Film Critics Association	1994	Best Picture	Heavenly Creatures	Nominated	
National Board of Review	1994	Top 10 Films	Heavenly Creatures	Won	
New Zealand Film and Television Awards	1995	Best Actress	Melanie Lynskey	Won	
New Zealand Film and Television Awards	1995	Best Supporting Actress	Sarah Peirse	Won	
New Zealand Film and Television Awards	1995	Best Foreign Performer	Kate Winslet	Won	
New Zealand Film and Television Awards	1995	Best Director	Peter Jackson	Won	
New Zealand Film and Television Awards	1995	Best Film Score	Peter Dasent	Won	
New Zealand Film and Television Awards	1995	Best Editing	Jamie Selkirk	Won	
New Zealand Film and Television Awards	1995	Best Soundtrack	Mike Hopkins; Greg Bell; Michael Hedges	Won	
New Zealand Film and Television Awards	1995	Best Design	Grant Major	Won	
New Zealand Film and Television Awards	1995	Best Contribution to Design	Richard Taylor; George Port	Won	
New Zealand Film and Television Awards	1995	Best Cinematography	Alun Bollinger	Nominated	
Toronto International Film Festival	1994	Metro Media Award	Peter Jackson	Won	
Venice Film Festival	1994	Silver Lion	Peter Jackson	Won	
Writers Guild of America Award	1995	Best Screenplay Written Directly for the Screen	Peter Jackson; Fran Walsh	Nominated	

== Home media ==
In 1996 the film was released on videocassette and on Laserdisc at its original runtime of 99 minutes. In 2002 the film received DVD releases in Region 1 and Region 4 in an uncut version, which ran for 109 minutes. Region 2 released the original 99-minute theatrical version. As of 2026, the film has been notably absent from streaming and digital platforms, likely due to the fact that it was distributed by Miramax, then co-owned by Harvey Weinstein, whose films have notably become entangled in numerous legal rights issues since his sexual assault charges and convictions since 2017 (a situation that also occurred with Kevin Smith's film Dogma until said issues were cleared up for its 2025 re-release).

== See also ==
- "Lisa the Drama Queen", an episode of The Simpsons loosely based on the film.
- Don't Deliver Us from Evil, another film loosely based on the Parker–Hulme case.
- Perfect Sisters, similar plot
