= Australasian Association for Theatre, Drama and Performance Studies =

Academic society in Australia and New Zealand, since 1977

Australasian Association for Theatre, Drama and Performance
- Formation: 1977
- President: Rea Dennis
- Website: www.adsa.edu.au

The Australasian Association for Theatre, Drama and Performance Studies (ADSA), formerly the Australian Drama Studies Association, is an academic association promoting the study of theatre in New Zealand and Australia.

== History ==
The Australian Drama Studies Association was established in 1977 by Philip Parsons AM (1926–1993), an academic in drama based at the University of New South Wales, known also for being a co-founder of the performing arts publishing company Currency Press.

The association changed its name in 1993, but kept the abbreviation of ADSA.

== Publications and conferences ==
ADSA publishes a peer-reviewed journal, Australian Drama Studies, established in 1982. It also holds an annual conference.

== Awards ==
ADSA awards a number of prizes, as well as life memberships. Notable life members include Lisa Warrington, Katharine Brisbane, Gareth Griffiths, and David O’Donnell.

Awards include:

- Marlis Thiersch Prize – "for research excellence in an English-language article or book chapter published anywhere in the world in the broad field of theatre and performance studies"
- Rob Jordan Prize – for "the best book on a theatre, drama or performance studies related subject published in the previous two years"
- Joanne Tompkins Prize – for "excellence in book and journal editing", once every four years, starting in 2017
- Peta Tait Prize – for "excellence in creative projects and scholarship achievement over time".
- Flinders University AusStage Prize – "to recognise research excellence that utilises AusStage in articles, books, and non-traditional digital outputs"

=== Philip Parsons Prize ===
The Philip Parsons Prize for Performance as Research is "an annual Philip Parsons Prize for a senior student (honours or postgraduate) undertaking a Performance As Research (PAR) project". The inaugural award was given in 1995, but it has not been awarded every year since then. Prizewinners include:

- 2021 Michael Metzger (New Zealand)
- 2019 Margi Brown Ash (Griffith University)
- 2018 Alex Tálamo (University of New South Wales)
- 2017 Lynne Bradley (Queensland University of Technology) and David Joseph (University of New England) (joint winners)
- 2016 Suzie J. Jarmain (University of New England)
- 2015 Natasha Budd (Queensland University of Technology)
- 2014 Emily O'Connor (University of New South Wales)
- 2013 Teresa Izzard (Curtin University)
- 2011 Rachel Swain (Melbourne University)
- 2009 Ben Knapton (Queensland University of Technology)
- 2008 Leah Mercer (Queensland University of Technology)
- 2007 David Fenton (Queensland University of Technology)
- 2005 Liza-Mare Syron (University of Wollongong)
- 2004 Julie Robson (Queensland University of Technology)
- 2003 Amanda Lynch and Neal Harvey (University of Queensland)
- 2000 Michael Noble (Murdoch University)
- 1998 Sandra d'Urso (La Trobe)
- 1997 Cracka Theatre Company (University of Queensland)
- 1996 Stacey Callaghan (University of New England)
- 1995 Tim Benzie (University of Queensland)
