= Hilary Norris =

New Zealand stage, film and television actress

Hilary Norris is a New Zealand stage, film and television actress.

== Biography ==
Norris has performed on stage and in film and television productions. She performed in theatre productions at Dunedin's Fortune Theatre from 1975 to 2013, and holds the record for the most appearances at the Fortune.

Norris serves as an adjudicator for theatre festivals across New Zealand.

=== Recognition ===
Norris received a Lifetime Achievement Award at the 2013 Dunedin Theatre Awards.

== Filmography ==
Year	Title	Role	Notes
2017	Boxes	Grandmother	
2014	The Light Between Oceans	Matron	
2014	How to Murder Your Wife	Annie Cousins	
2024	The Rule of Jenny Pen	Eunice Joyce	
2026	Black Sheeps	Moira	
