= OISTAT =

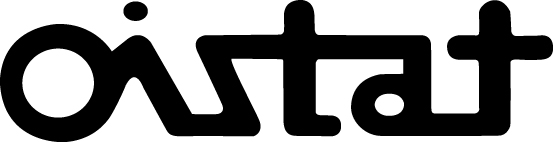
Formation / 1968; Type / NGO; Official language / English; Status / Active; Headquarters / Taipei, Taiwan; Website / Oistat.org

The International Organisation of Scenographers, Theatre Architects and Technicians (OISTAT) is a non-governmental organization (NGO) founded in 1968 in Prague, Czech Republic. According to its founding name, the organization is mainly a network for theatre designers, theatre architects and theatre technicians around the world, made up of people associated with creating or studying live performances, including educators, researchers and practitioners. The organization has members from 51 countries, in the membership categories: Centre Member, Associate Member and Individual Member.

== History ==
The predecessor of the organization was the scenography section of the International Theatre Institute (ITI), founded in 1948. This institute was expected to form an international co-operation of all artistic fields and establish leading publishing and educational direction from the drama sections. The project failed, but interest in the visual elements of theatre grew. Shortly after, in 1958, the International Association of Theatre Technicians (IATT) was formed in Paris. This association also faltered due to lack of direction, programming, organizational structure, administrative and financial provisions.

The representatives sought ITI to take up the activities again, and the ITI Secretary General Jean Darcante went to Prague in 1967 to discuss with representatives of the Czechoslovak National ITI Center, the Theatre Institute and the Institute of Scenography, the possibility of establishing an organization with a general secretariat in Prague. Czechoslovak scenographers, including professional workers and theatre specialists from both institutions, prepared a draft program for the activity of the new organization with the Czechoslovak Ministry of Culture. Darcante travelled to Prague again in early 1968 to obtain a binding promise from the Czechoslovak official authorities and agree the final details with the Theatre Institute and the Institute of Scenography. On 7 and 8 June 1968, the foundation committee met to establish the new International Organization of Scenographers and Theatre Technicians (French: Organisation Internationale des Scénographes et Technicians de Théatre; OISTT). The founding membership consisted of representatives from Czechoslovakia, Canada, Israel, Hungary, the German Democratic Republic, the Federal Republic of Germany and the United States.

== Organizational structure ==
=== The World Congress ===
OISTAT is composed of members in regions around the world, known as OISTAT Centres, Associate members and Individual members. As defined in the statutes, "the directing body of OISTAT is the Congress, which is formed when the delegates of the OISTAT Centres, Associate Members and Individual Members are assembled in plenary session". Every four years, the delegates of the World Congress elect the president and the members of executive committee. They also decide on changes in the statutes and other arising issues of the organization.

=== Executive committee and governing board ===
OISTAT affairs are coordinated by the governing board and its executive committee. The executive committee consists of eight elected members including the president, elected at the congress. The governing board consists of the elected chairs of the six commissions.

=== Headquarters ===
The Headquarters, known as the Secretariat until 2011, are the only constant office of the organization in charge of daily communications, and serve as the central network for its members and commissions. The Headquarters has moved twice since its foundation; it was in Prague from 1968-1993, in the Netherlands from 1993-2005, and since 2006 it is in Taipei, Taiwan.

=== Commissions ===
Six commissions lead various projects in their field of studies:

- Architecture: The Architecture commission was composed mainly of architects, theatre designers and technicians. The commission initiated the quadrennial Theatre Architecture Competition (TAC) in 1978 and the finalist designs are exhibited at the Prague Quadrennial.
- Education: This commission is the main facilitator of OISTAT Scenofest and International Stage Design Students' Works Exchange (ISDSWE) in Beijing, China.
- Research: The Research commission focuses on the theoretical and historical aspects of theatre scenography, architecture, and technologies. The Theatre Timeline Sub-commission is a recent establishment by the commission focusing on archiving theatre technologies, recording and preservation.
- Performance design: Performance Design includes four sub-commissions: Costume Design, Lighting Design, Sound Design and Space Design.
- Publication and communication: This commission's recent projects include Core Strategy, World Scenography, the Digital Theatre Words and the Bibliography of Theatre Arts.
- Technology: OISTAT Technology facilitates exchange of ideas in the field of theatre technology, develops research projects, and examines standards and safety issues. The commission offers technical advice and support for theatre technicians worldwide. The Theatre Invention Prize (TIP) is a competition initiated since 2011 by the commission.

== OISTAT projects ==
=== Theatre Architecture Competition (TAC) ===
Theatre Architecture Competition is an international ideas competition, aimed at students and emerging practitioners, which is organized every four years by the Architecture commission. The sites of the competition have been in these cities:

- 1978, Paris, France
- 1983, Stockholm, Sweden
- 1990, Moscow, Russia
- 1999, Prague, Czech Republic
- 2003, Hengelo, Netherlands
- 2007, Prague, Czech Republic
- 2011, Prague, Czech Republic
- 2015, Berlin, Germany
- 2017, Hsinchu, Taiwan

In 2011, the competition theme was to design a theatre for a specific performance. The theatre can be in 'found' spaces which were not previously or presently a performing space or create a temporary installation.

In 2015, the theme was to construct a 'floating theatre' on Spree River in Berlin, Germany. The competition has moved from Prague Quadrennial to Berlin's Stage|Set|Scenery.

In 2017, the theme is 'Theatre as Public Space'. The aim of the competition is to challenge the conventional typology of the theatre and to focus on the design of a temporary theatre (or theatres) in The Public Activity Center, a disused sports stadium in Hsinchu City in Taiwan. The 25 selected entries of TAC 2017 were exhibited and awarded during 2017 World Stage Design on July 1–9, 2017 in Taipei, Taiwan.

=== World Stage Design ===
World Stage Design is an international exhibition of performance design from theatre, dance, music, and opera, as well as a showcase for cross-disciplinary performances and installations in non-conventional theatre spaces since 2005. It is held every four years on different continents, to purposely show the latest designs in theatre performances. Different from the Prague Quadrennial which presents designs curated by each country, World Stage Design allows every individual designer to submit design works directly to the curatorial panel for the grand exhibition. It has been in these cities:

- 2005, Toronto, Canada
- 2009, Seoul, South Korea
- 2013, Cardiff, UK
- 2017, Taipei, Taiwan
- 2022, Calgary, Canada (postponed from 2021 due to COVID-19)

=== Scenofest ===
OISTAT Scenofest has been held in conjunction with Prague Quadrennial since 2003. It provides seminars, workshops, thematic exhibitions, performances, and presentations in the field of theatre design. Since 2013, Scenofest has formed new connections with World Stage Design.

== OISTAT publications ==
- World Scenography is a three-volume series which aims to gather significant scenographic works of theatre set, costume, and lighting designs from 1975 to 2015. The first volume World Scenography 1975-1990, published in 2012, documented 430 designs from 61 countries and was awarded the United States Institute for Theatre Technology Golden Pen Award in March 2014. The second volume World Scenography 1990-2005 was published in 2014.
- Digital Theatre Words is an ongoing digital publication project launched by OISTAT Publication and Communication to edit the most common theatre terms into a multi-language dictionary. The project comprises 2,000 theatre terms in 24 languages, along with descriptions, photos, and pronunciations. The Digital Theatre Words mobile application was launched on 15 June 2014.
- New Theatre Words is an illustrated multi-lingual theatre dictionary and reference first published in 1975. There are currently three editions: Northern Europe, Central Europe, and World Edition, comprising 25 languages in total.
