= Simon O'Connor (actor) =

New Zealand playwright and academic

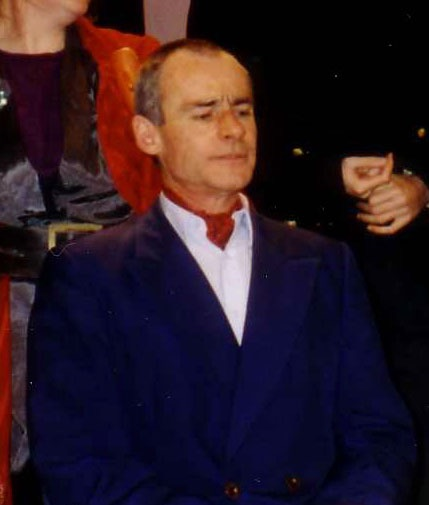
New Zealand actor Simon O'Connor, onstage in 1993

Simon O'Connor (born 1949 in Wellington) is a New Zealand actor and playwright.

O'Connor began his stage career in the late 1960s after reading an article about Dunedin's Globe Theatre. He travelled to the southern city where he studied theatre for three years. He began writing, with a first short piece, Lift, being produced in 1974.

Since this time, O'Connor has appeared as an actor on stage, radio, and television, and notably in the role of Herbert Rieper in Sir Peter Jackson's film Heavenly Creatures, for which he was nominated for Best Male Performance in a Supporting Role in the 1995 New Zealand Film and Television Awards.

O'Connor's television appearances have included a central role in 2015 black comedy How to Murder Your Wife, as well as roles in Shark in the Park, Close to Home, and Country GP. He was also a writer on both of the latter series.

In 1992, O'Connor became a teaching fellow at the University of Otago's Theatre Studies Department, specialising in playwriting. Fellow staff at the department included Lisa Warrington, Richard Huber, David O'Donnell, and Hilary Halba. He was a co-founder of Dunedin's Talking House community arts trust.

O'Connor was the winner of the 1984 Bruce Mason Playwriting Award.
