= Globe Theatre, Dunedin =

Theatre and theatre company in Dunedin, New Zealand

Globe Theatre
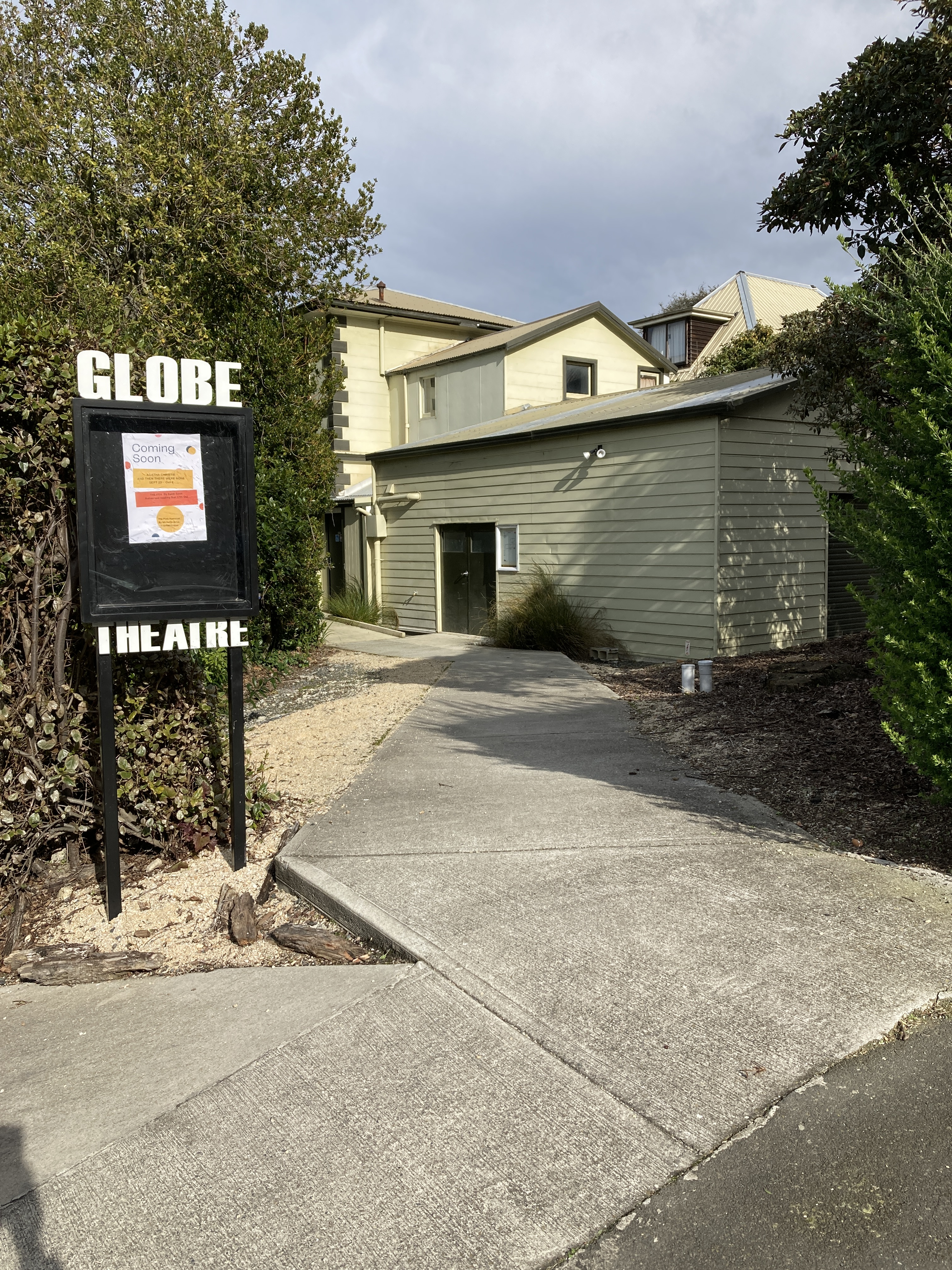
- Location: Dunedin
- Coordinates: 45.8707°S 170.4997°E
- Capacity: 80

Construction
- Opened: 1961
- Architect: William Mason; Niel Mason

Website
- globetheatre.org.nz

Globe Theatre is a theatre located in Dunedin, New Zealand, and the amateur theatre company that runs it. The theatre was built in 1961 by Patric and Rosalie Carey as an extension of their house. The building to which it is attached, at 104 London Street, was designed by architect William Mason as his own house and built in 1864. Ralph Hotere designed both sets and costumes for the theatre productions. The foyer area was also used for exhibitions, notably the Waterfall paintings of Colin McCahon, paintings by Michael Smither, and pots by Barry Brickell, Len Castle, and Doreen Blumhardt.

== 104 London Street as residence ==
The large family house at 104 London Street was designed by architect William Mason as his own house and built in 1864. Mason built his residence at 104 London Street in 1864. When he retired to Glenorchy, he sold the house to Robert Blackadder, a Dunedin merchant, who occupied it from 1879 to 1901, and then sold it to Dunedin draper Herbert Haynes, who resided there from 1901 to 1915. From 1915 to his death in 1941, the house was owned by Alexander Beggs, son of Charles Begg, of the music and piano store. Beggs' widow Christina remarried to John McLaren in 1948, and after her death in 1956 it passed into the ownership of McLaren. Rosalie Carey MNZM (1921–2011) and Patric Carey (1920–2006) bought the house from McLaren in November 1957.

== 104 London Street as theatre ==
The Careys came to Dunedin intending to start a theatrical company, despite being aware of Sybil Thorndyke's description of the city as "the graveyard of theatre". The Careys first staged productions in the garden and drawing-room, but began excavations to add a theatre off the former drawing room in 1961. The addition was designed by Niel Wales, who was the grandson of Nathaniel Wales, Mason's partner in Mason and Wales architects, and was originally approved by the council only as an extension to Rosalie Carey's teaching studio. According to theatre studies lecturer David Carnegie, the theatre may have been the first in New Zealand built without a proscenium arch.

The Globe Theatre opened on 31 May 1961, with a production of Romeo and Juliet, and a seating capacity of 45. Juliet was played by Dallas Campbell and Romeo by Richard Butler. Patric Carey acted and produced, while Rosalie acted, took charge of costumes, fed cast and crew and kept the books. Rosalie Carey left Dunedin after 18 years.

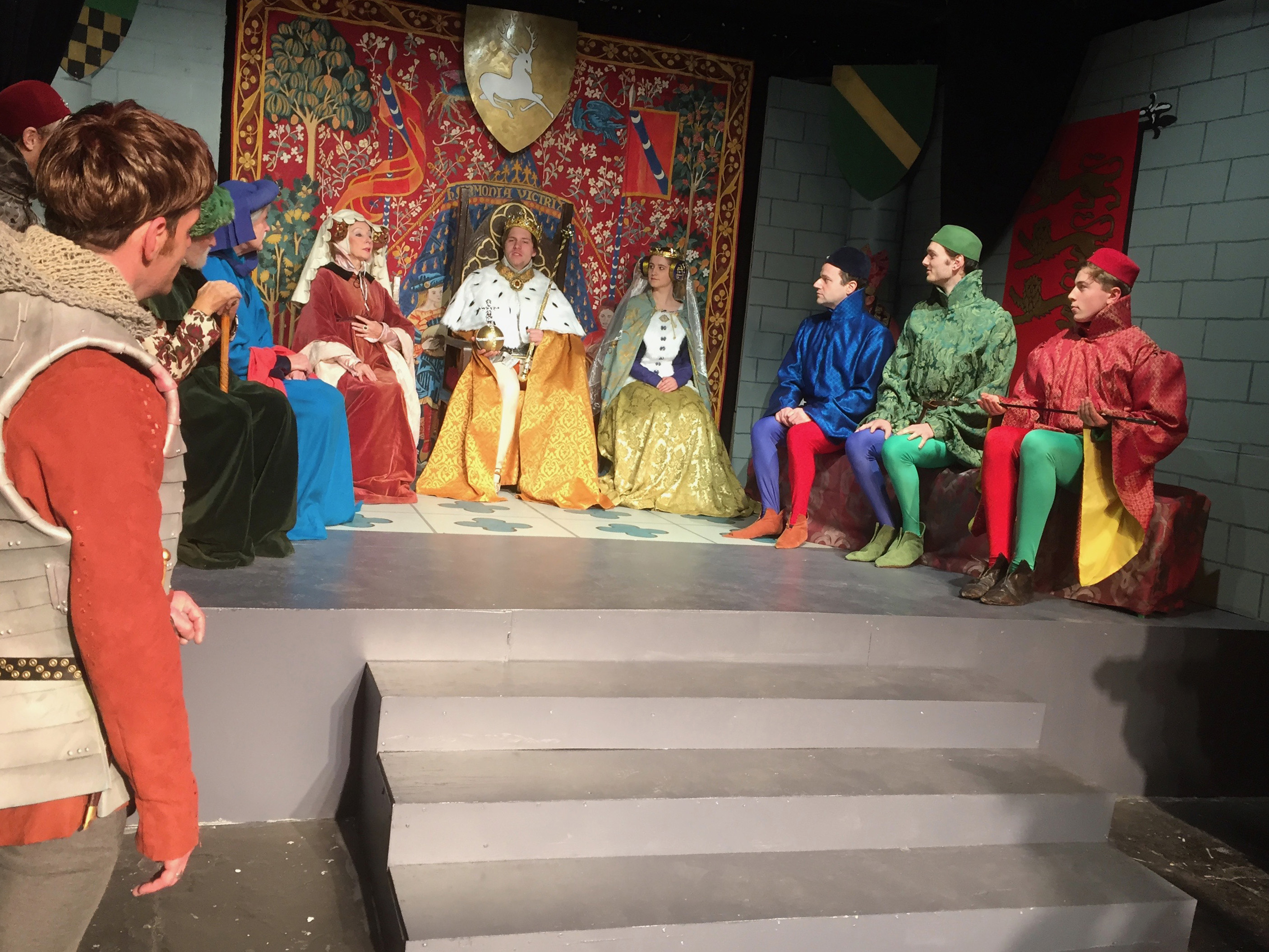
Opening scene from Richard II in 2019, costumes by Charmian Smith and Sophie Welvaert

== Theatre company ==
A complete list of plays performed at the Globe up to 1973 is included as an appendix in Rosalie Carey's book A Theatre in the House. The theatre premiered all or most of James K. Baxter's plays, and held first productions in New Zealand for many other playwrights such as Samuel Beckett. Academic, actor and playwright Simon O'Connor spent three years at the Globe after reading a Listener article about the Careys.

As of 2021, the Globe is administered by a society, the Friends of the Globe. The Globe continues to entertain Dunedin, with recent productions including Friedrich Schiller's Mary Stuart, adapted by Keith Scott, in 2016, and Shakespeare's Richard II in 2019 both receiving praise for Charmian Smith's historical costumes. By 2016, the theatre capacity had been increased to 70.
