= Allen Hall Theatre =

University of Otago building, Leith Street, Dunedin, New Zealand

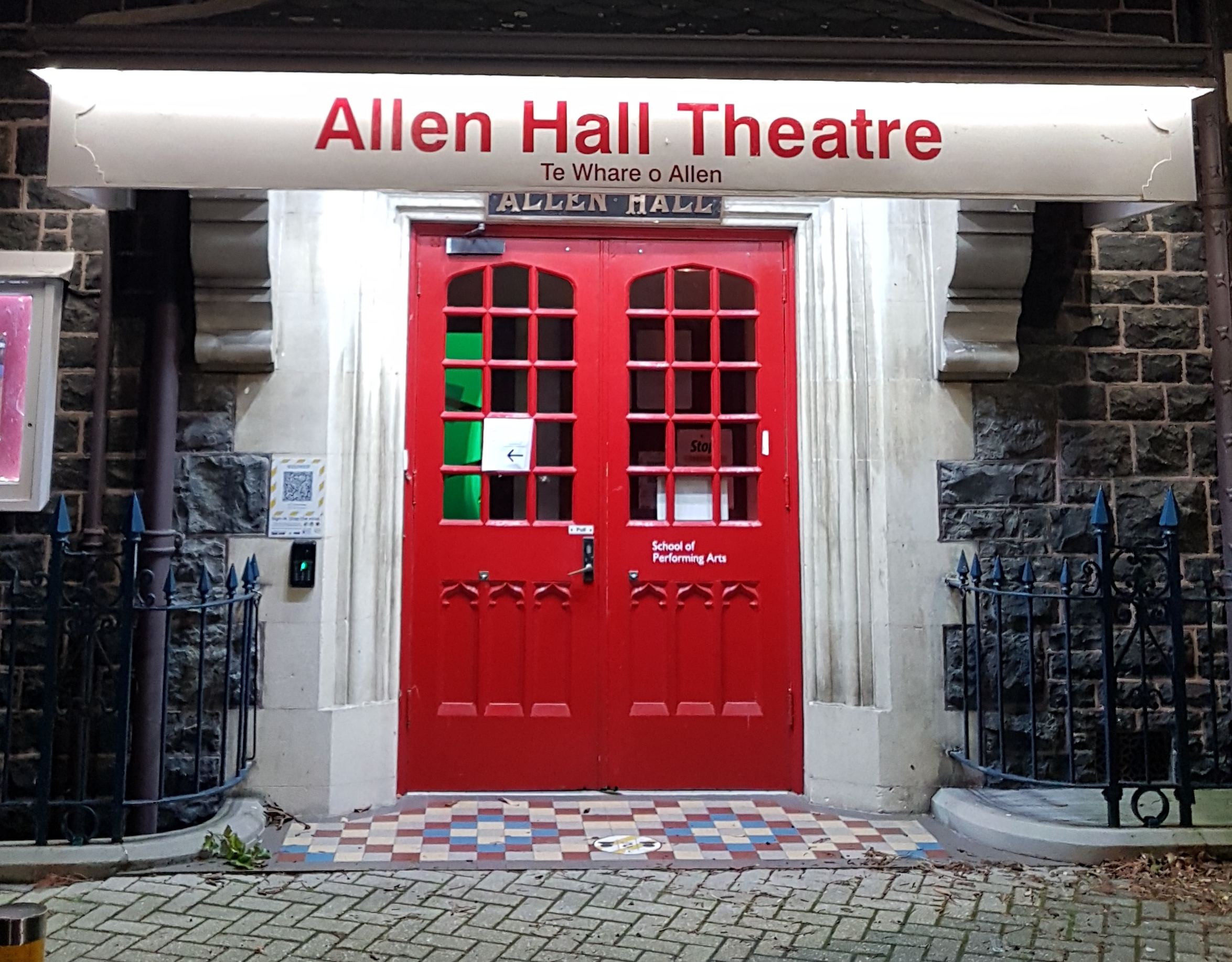
- Location: Dunedin
- Operator: Performing Arts University of Otago
- Capacity: number of people

Construction
- Opened: 1914
- Renovated: 1970s
- Architect: Edmund Anscombe

Heritage New Zealand – Category 1
- Official name: University of Otago Allen Hall Theatre and Archway
- Designated: 7 July 1988
- Reference no.: 2225

Allen Hall, also known as the Allen Hall Theatre, is a building at the University of Otago in Dunedin, New Zealand. It is named after James Allen, Vice-Chancellor and then Chancellor of the university, who was instrumental in raising funds for building the hall. Originally the student association building, opened in 1914, the hall now operates as a theatre. Allen Hall is known for the series of Lunchtime Theatre performances. The hall and archway are registered as a Category I historic place by Heritage New Zealand.

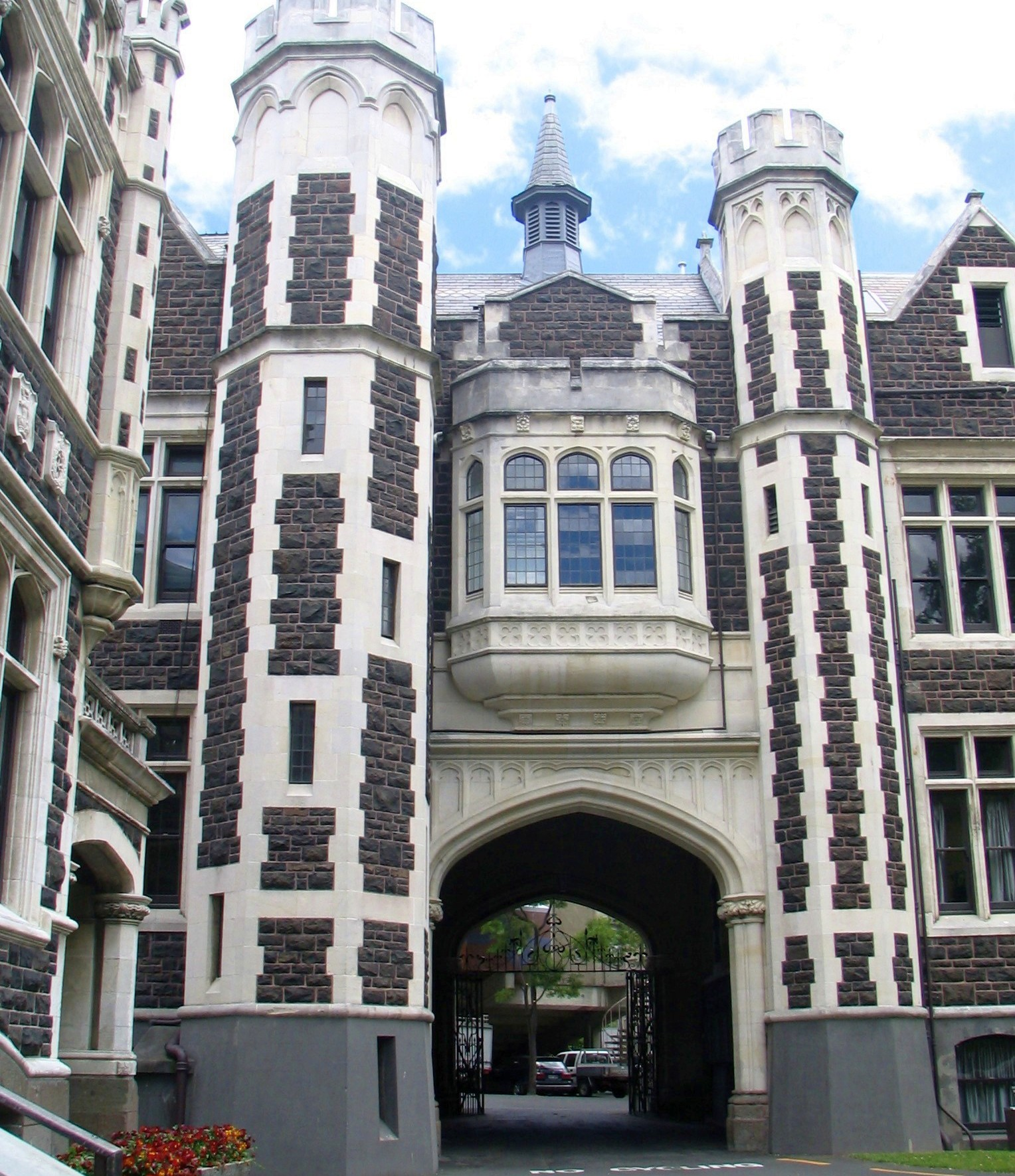
University of Otago Archway part of Allen Hall

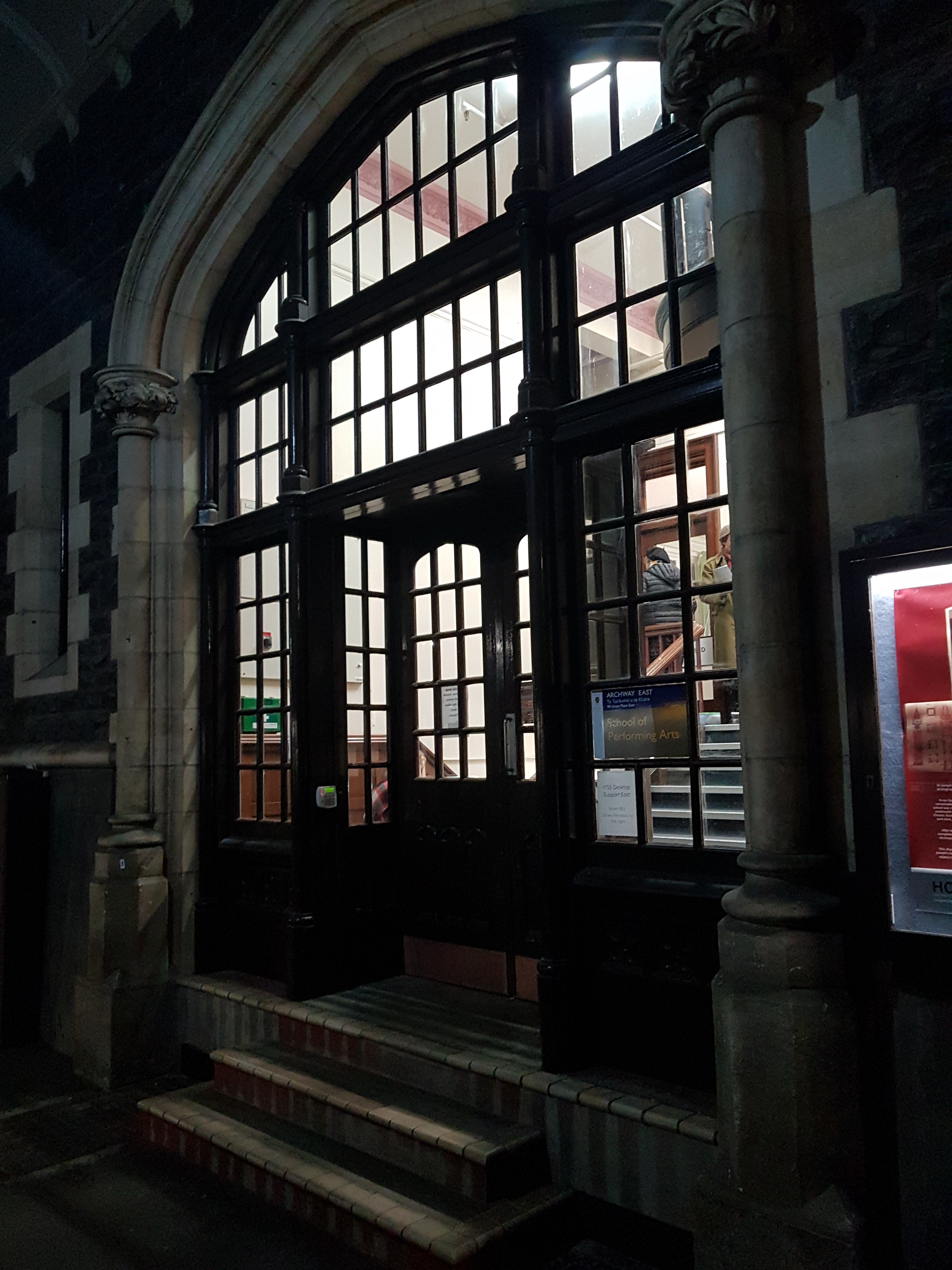
Allen Hall archway entrance at night

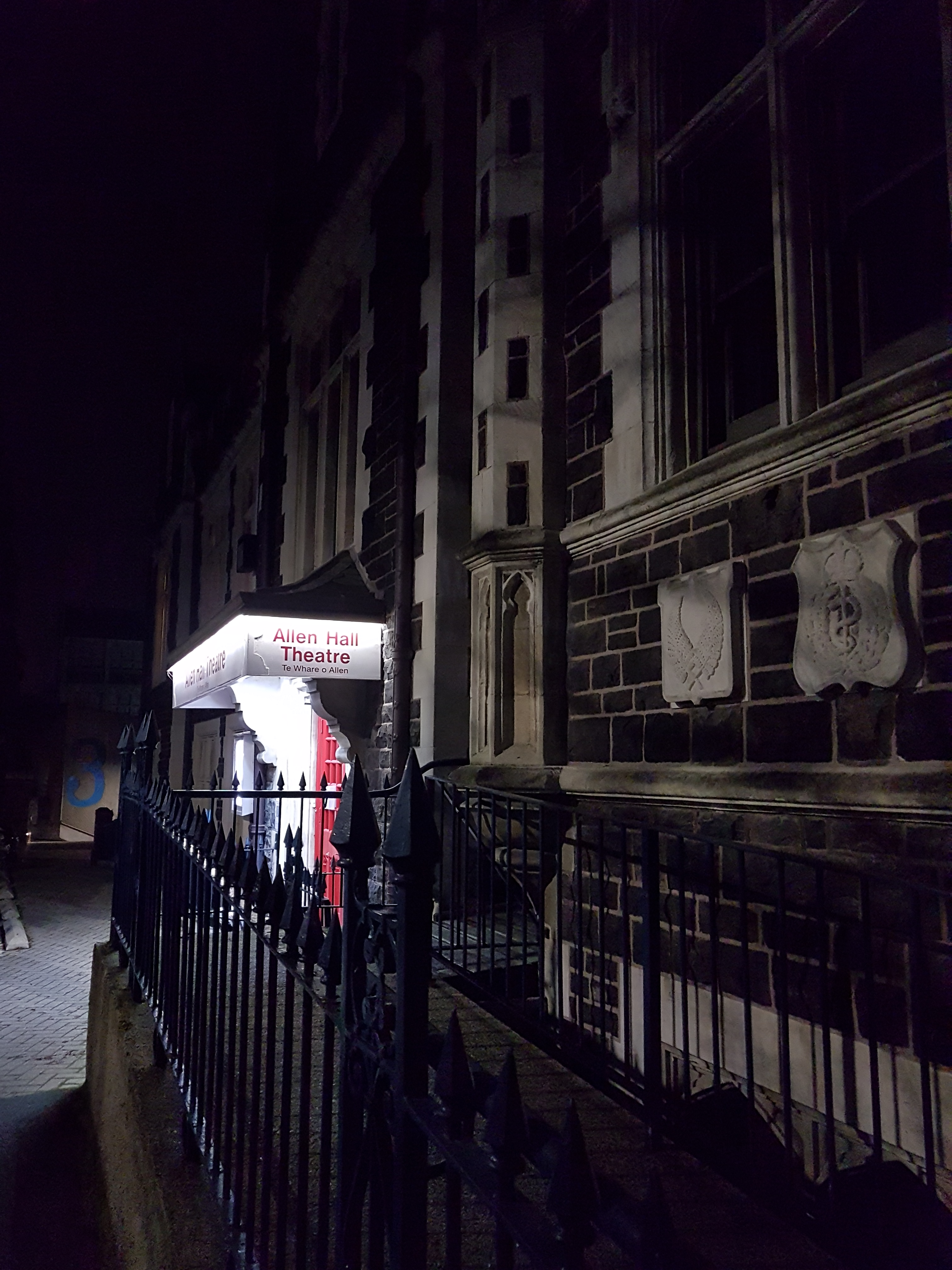
Allen Hall's recognisable red door entrance

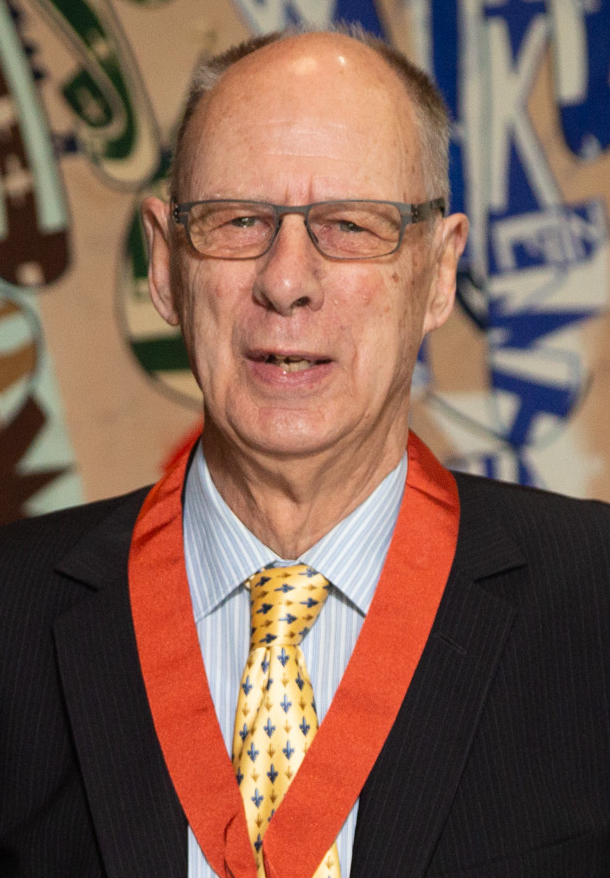
Roger Hall KNZM (cropped)

== History of the building ==
In 1909 it was proposed that a building be constructed for the use of students. At that time, the university had 323 students, with only two cloakrooms. There was nowhere for students to socialise, read, or pass the time between lectures. Furthermore, the largest room was the Chemistry Lecture Hall, which was too small to accommodate all the students of the university at once, having space only to seat the women students, and leaving the men ranged around the walls and listening from the corridors. Social events were required to be held in hired halls off-campus due to the fixed seating in the lecture theatre.

The proposal was made in 1909 for a building to house a ballroom for socials and student meetings, a reading room and committee room, cloak rooms, a gymnasium, lunch room and lavatories, at an estimated cost of £6000. By 1911, the estimated cost of construction had risen to £10,500. Architect Edmund Anscombe, who had just completed the Dental School and the School of Mines, was appointed by mid-1912. It was used for graduation ceremonies and started being used for performing arts in the 1920s.

The building, constructed of bluestone with white facings, was officially opened by the Governor of New Zealand Lord Liverpool on 7 April 1914. Alumna Emily Seideberg donated an armchair for the women's cloakroom.

In 1960 due to a growing enrolment University of Otago opened a bigger Student Union building and the Allen Hall fell into disrepair until the theatre department took it over. It had renovations in the early 1970s to adapt it for theatre use under the direction of Drama lecturer David Carnegie. In 1988, the building and adjoining archway were registered as a Category I historic place by Heritage New Zealand.

== Current facilities ==
Allen Hall has flexible seating units, sound, lighting and projection equipment. There are office spaces, rehearsal and teaching spaces and dressing rooms. There is also a theatre library and a costume and prop store. It is managed and used by the School of Performing Arts Te Kāhui Tau.

== Lunchtime theatre ==
Lunchtime Theatre is a regular slot where people can book time to do a performance in the university lunchtime, currently on a Thursday or Friday during the university terms. It has been a springboard for many people in the New Zealand theatre and has been going since 1977. There have been over 1,000 Lunchtime Theatre productions.

== Performances ==
Allen Hall was the venue for productions from departments other than Theatre Studies. French, German, Classics and Music departments all staged productions of plays or operas taught in their programmes. Molière's Les Femmes Savantes, Goethe's Faust, Euripides Medea and Purcell's Dido and Aeneas were notable productions. In addition to lunchtime theatre and plays staged by staff and students Allen Hall sometimes hosts visiting productions.

In 2014, in its centenary year, the Allen Hall Theatre was awarded an "Outstanding Contribution to Dunedin Theatre Award" at the Dunedin Theatre Awards.

== Notable people ==
Laurence Olivier and his wife Vivian Leigh visited the theatre on 2 October 1948, while touring the Commonwealth with the Old Vic Theatre Company. The pair received a raucous welcome from the packed crowd, the overflow from which was accommodated in the canteen, and Olivier "held the spellbound attention of his audience for about half an hour, in a manner which some of the lecturers present must have envied."

Many notable creative practitioners began their careers at Allen Hall, including comedians Jeremy Elwood and Te Radar, film makers and writers Duncan Sarkies and Matthew J. Saville, and actor Edwin Wright who is now based in Auckland.

Playwright Roger Hall received the University of Otago's Robert Burns Fellowship in 1977, after which he was appointed to teach a new course entitled "Theory and Practice of Playwriting". He organised Lunchtime Theatre for a year during the absence of the foundation drama lecturer Jane Oakshott.
