= Hilary Halba =

New Zealand actor, theatre director and academic

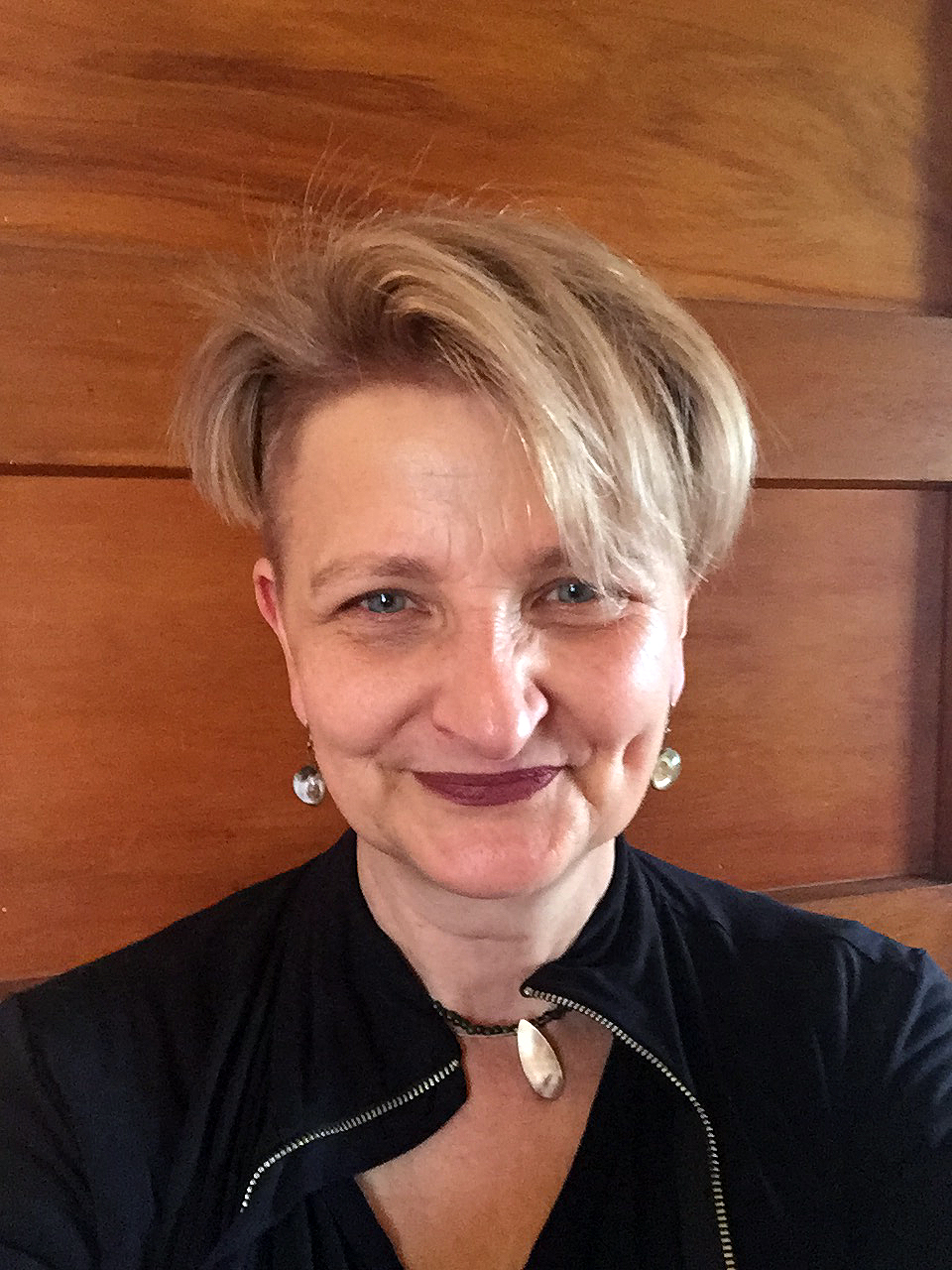
- Halba in 2019
- Occupations: Actor; theatre director; academic

Academic background
- Education: DipTchg, MA
- Alma mater: University of Otago

Academic work
- Discipline: Performing arts
- Institutions: University of Otago
- Doctoral students: Abby Howells

Hilary May Halba (born c. 1962) is a New Zealand actor, theatre director and academic. She is the head of the performing arts programme at the University of Otago.

== Biography ==
Halba was born in Milton and attended Tokomairiro High School before studying at the University of Otago.

Halba studied acting and the teaching of acting at the Neighborhood Playhouse School of the Theater in New York City, and is an accredited teacher of the Meisner Technique. She was a founding member of theatre collectives Kilimogo Productions and Wow! Productions Trust.

In 2010 she collaborated with Stuart Young to research and create a verbatim theatre production telling stories of domestic violence.

In 2025, she co-edited the book Acting in Aotearoa with David O'Donnell.

=== Recognition ===
Halba won Best Female Performer in the 2012 Dunedin Theatre Awards, and was named Dunedin's best actor of 2003 by the New Zealand Listener.

== Theatre and television work ==
=== Theatre ===
| Year | Title | Author | Role | Notes |
|---|---|---|---|---|
| 2011 | Hush | | Researcher and performer | |
| 2010 | Skin Tight | Gary Henderson | Director | |
| 2010 | Mo and Jess Kill Susie | Gary Henderson | Actor | |
| 1999 | Whaea Kairau: Mother Hundred Eater | Apirana Taylor | Producer (Kilimogo Productions) | |
| 1997 | Ngā Tāngata Toa | Hone Kouka | Co-director (with Rangimoana Taylor) | |

=== Television ===
| Year | Title | Role | Notes |
|---|---|---|---|
| 1987 | The Marching Girls | Michelle | |

=== Film ===
| Year | Title | Role | Notes |
|---|---|---|---|
| 1994 | The Last Tattoo | Committee Woman | |
