= New Zealand performing arts venues =

New Zealand performing arts venues are places in New Zealand that are set up to host performing arts and music events such as theatre, dance and concerts.

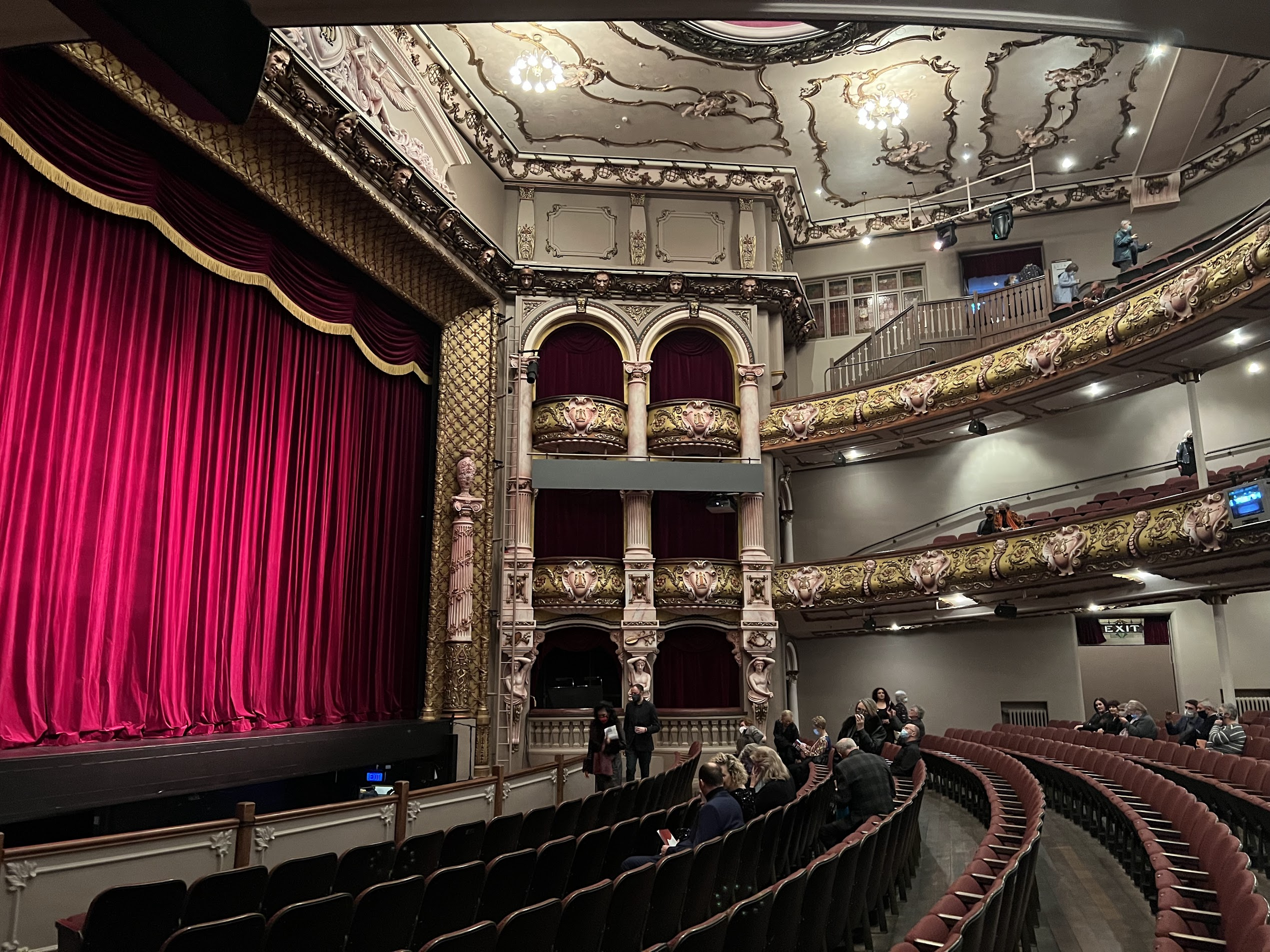
St James Theatre Wellington, in 2022

== History ==
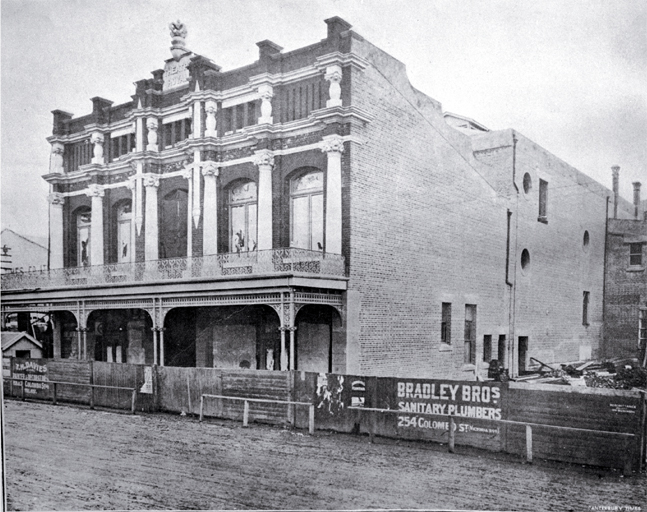
Theatre Royal, Christchurch 1907

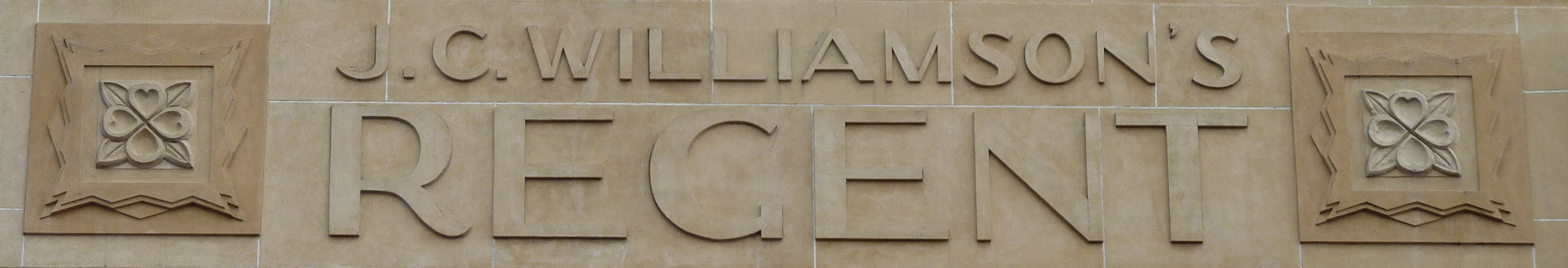
The stone sign J.C. Williamson's on the front of The Regent in Palmerston North.

Built indoor venues specifically for performing arts were created by British settler-colonists to New Zealand soon after settlements were established. In Wellington the first theatre was the Royal Victoria Theatre on Manners Street, which opened in September 1843. It was a small wooden building with stalls and a gallery, lit by whale oil gas. The first performances were the Rover of the seas and Crossing the line, or the twin brothers. The Royal Victoria Theatre closed in 1844 due to the competition of another new theatre, the Britannia Saloon (1844) in Willis Street. In Auckland the Fitzroy on Shortland Street opened in 1844.

J.C Williamson's built and leased theatres operating in New Zealand including the Theatre Royal that opened in 1907. Others included His Majesty's Theatre in Auckland (demolished in 1987), the Opera House in Wellington, the Regent Theatre in Palmerston North and The Regent Theatre, Greymouth (opened February 1935).

After the Second World War, over 300 memorial halls were built in city suburbs and small towns, using subsidies from central government.

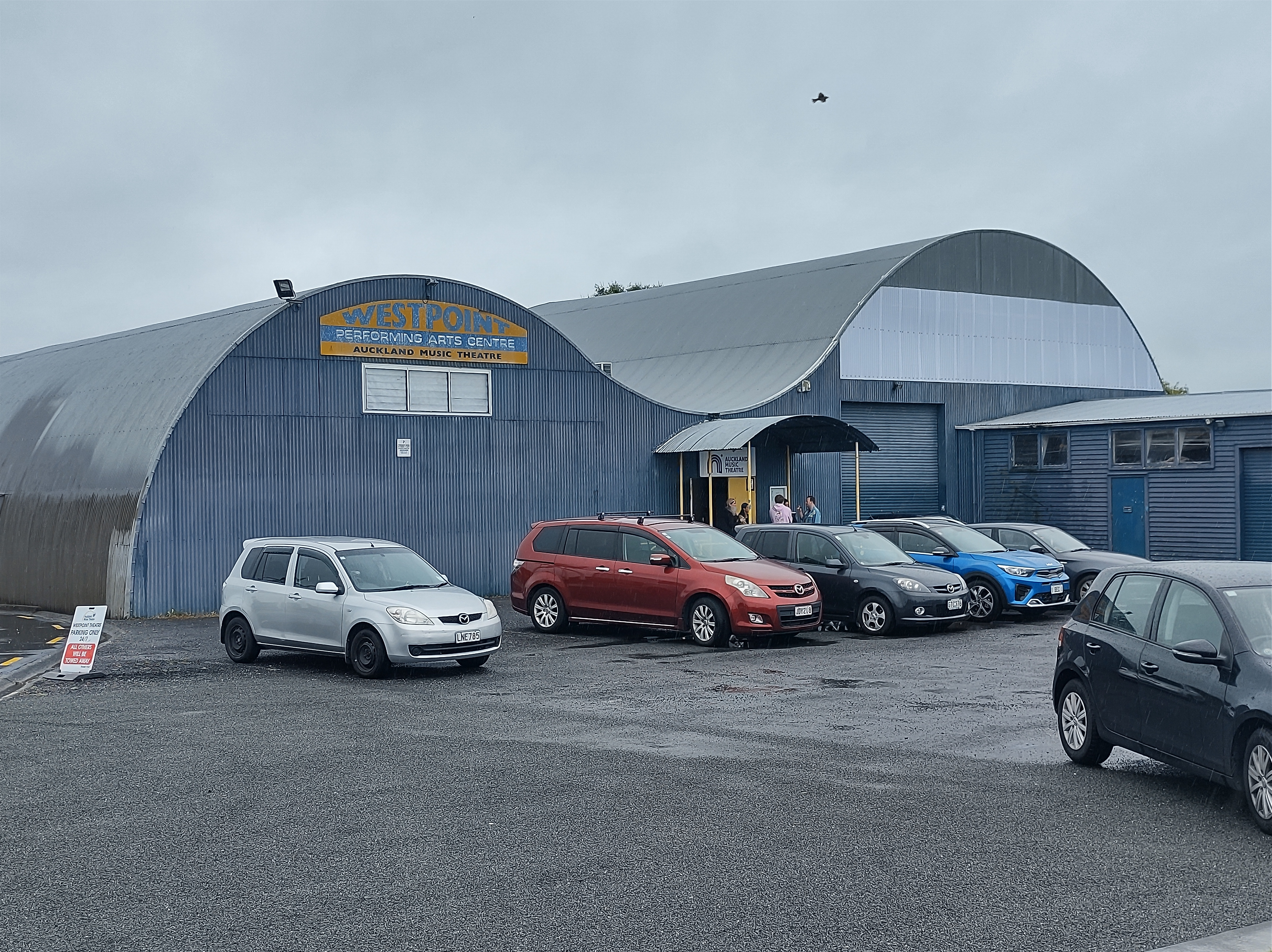
Westpoint, Auckland

== Venues ==
This is not a comprehensive list of all venues rather an overview. Most towns have a town hall with concert facilities. There are also lots of venues owned and maintained by amateur societies (musical theatre and drama) such as Westpoint Performing Arts Centre, Western Springs, Auckland.

There are also purpose built auditoriums and facilities in some schools.

Entertainment Venues Association Of New Zealand (EVANZ) is a members organisation that does advocacy and development for venues such as theatres, stadia, arenas, convention centres, sports grounds and community event centres.

=== Whangārei ===
Forum North in Whangārei operating for over 40 years has a main theatre and exhibition hall.

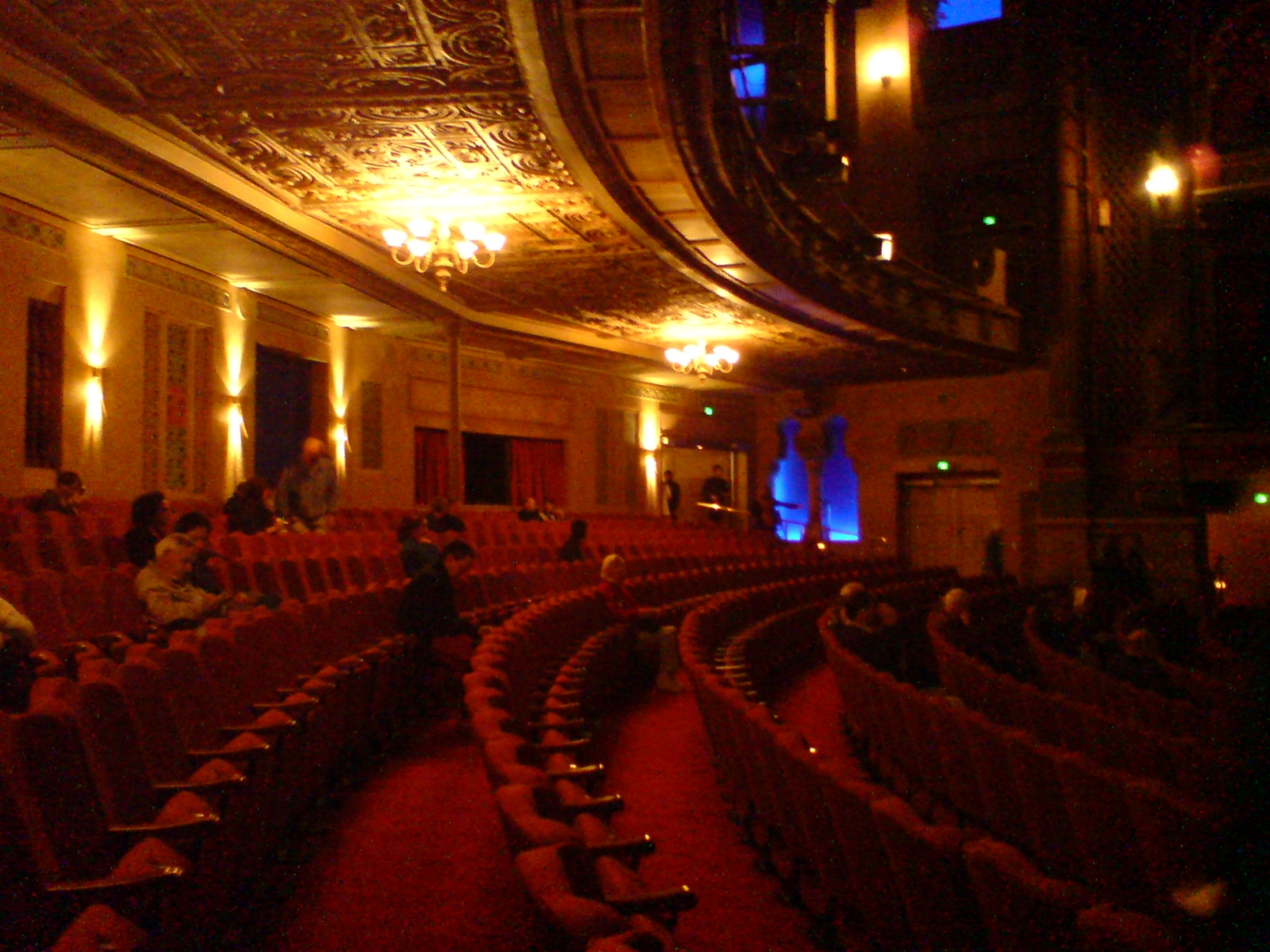
Interior of auditorium Civic Theatre, Auckland

=== Auckland ===
Auckland central has on Queen Street the Aotea Centre, The Civic, Q Theatre, The Classic: Comedy Club and the Auckland Town Hall. The St. James Theatre, built for vaudeville acts originally is closed with a renewed campaign to save it in 2021 that has the backing of Auckland Central MP Chloe Swarbrick. Three venues very different from each other that are near to Auckland city centre are Sky City Theatre in a casino, the Basement Theatre and the ASB Waterfront Theatre. Other notable venues in Auckland are the Bruce Mason Centre in Takapuna and the Corban Estate Arts Centre in Henderson that includes Te Pou Theatre.

=== Tauranga ===
The Baycourt Community and Arts Centre is a multi-purpose performing arts and theatre facility in the central business district of Tauranga. It has a main auditorium, the Addison Theatre, that seats 589. One of the unusual features of Baycourt is its Wurlizter organ.

=== Hamilton ===
Venues in Hamilton include the Meteor Theatre, Clarence St Theatre, and Riverlea Theatre. The Founders Theatre was closed due to health and safety concerns in 2016. A new facility, the Waikato Regional Theatre, is due to open in 2025 after delays due to "a tight market for materials" and the COVID-19 pandemic.

=== Taupō ===
The Great Lakes Centre at Taupō has a theatre for up to 600 people and an exhibition hall.

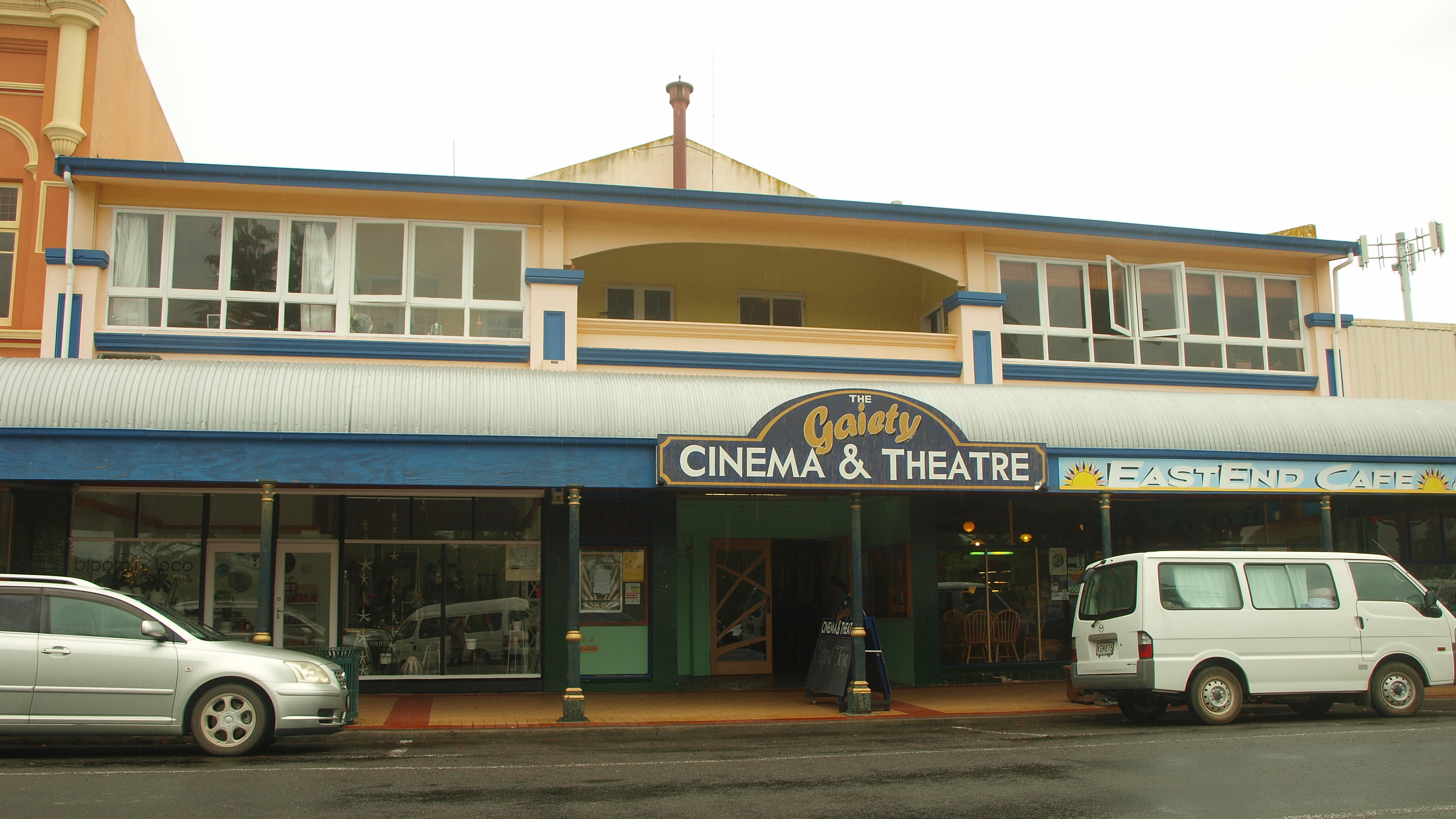
Gaiety Cinema and Theatre, Wairoa

=== Wairoa ===
The Gaiety Cinema and Theatre, located at 252 Marine Parade was built in 1925. It was destroyed in the 1931 Hawkes Bay earthquake, but was subsequently rebuilt in 1932 in an Art Deco style, and is a Category 2 listed historic building. It has hosted many events including screenings of movies, concerts, political rallies and boxing matches. It closed in 1960 and was used for a variety of purposes including as a supermarket and basketball court. In 1998, work was completed to restore it to its former use as a cinema and theatre and it was reopened in 2000. Finances forced it to close in 2009. It reopened in 2015 with support from the Wairoa District Council. It has a capacity of 250 patrons.

=== Napier ===
In Napier is the Hawke's Bay Municipal Theatre.

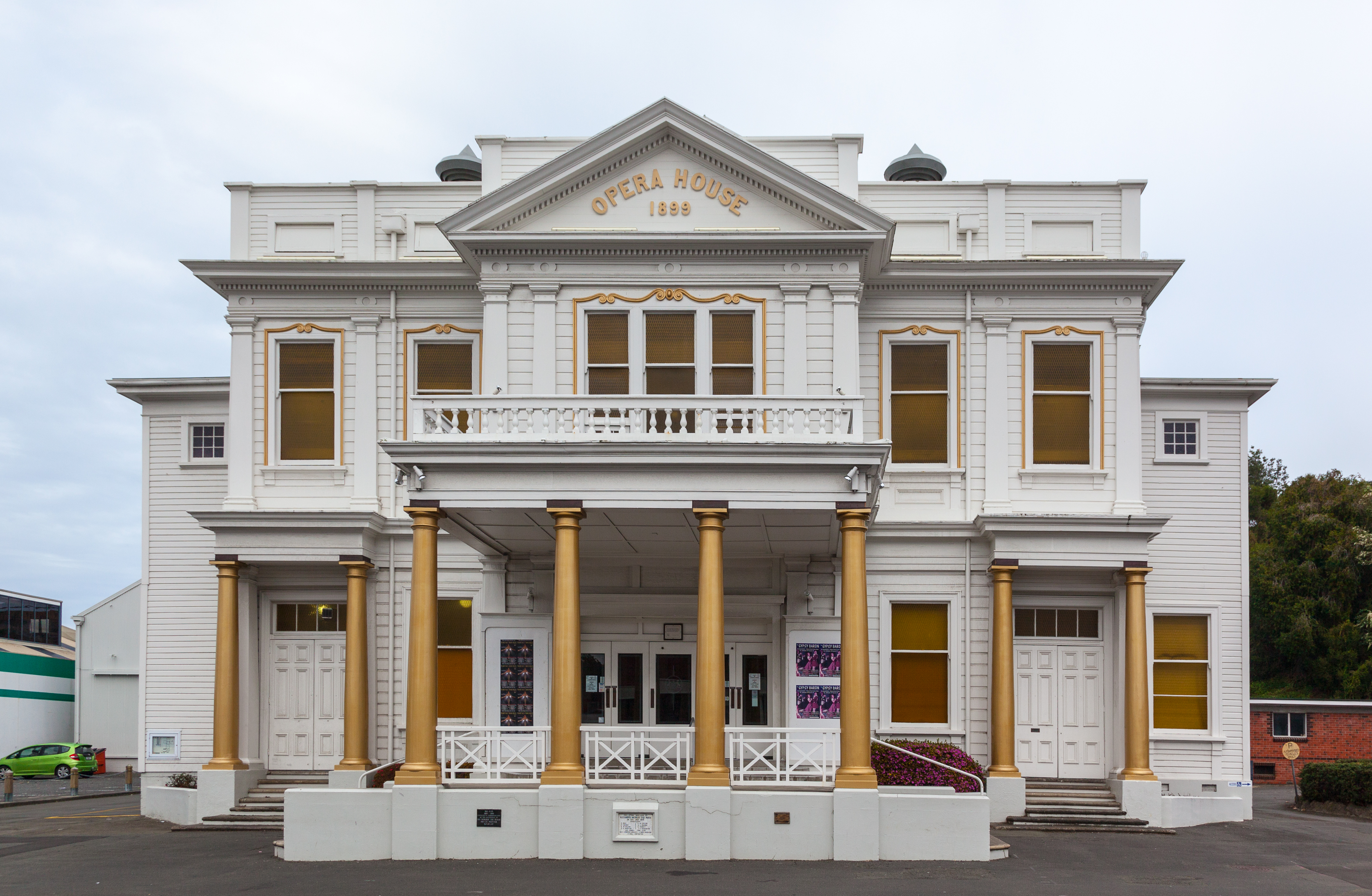
Royal Whanganui Opera House

=== Whanganui ===
The Royal Whanganui Opera House is a Category 1 listed historic building that opened in 1900. It is said to be the New Zealand's last Victorian theatre.

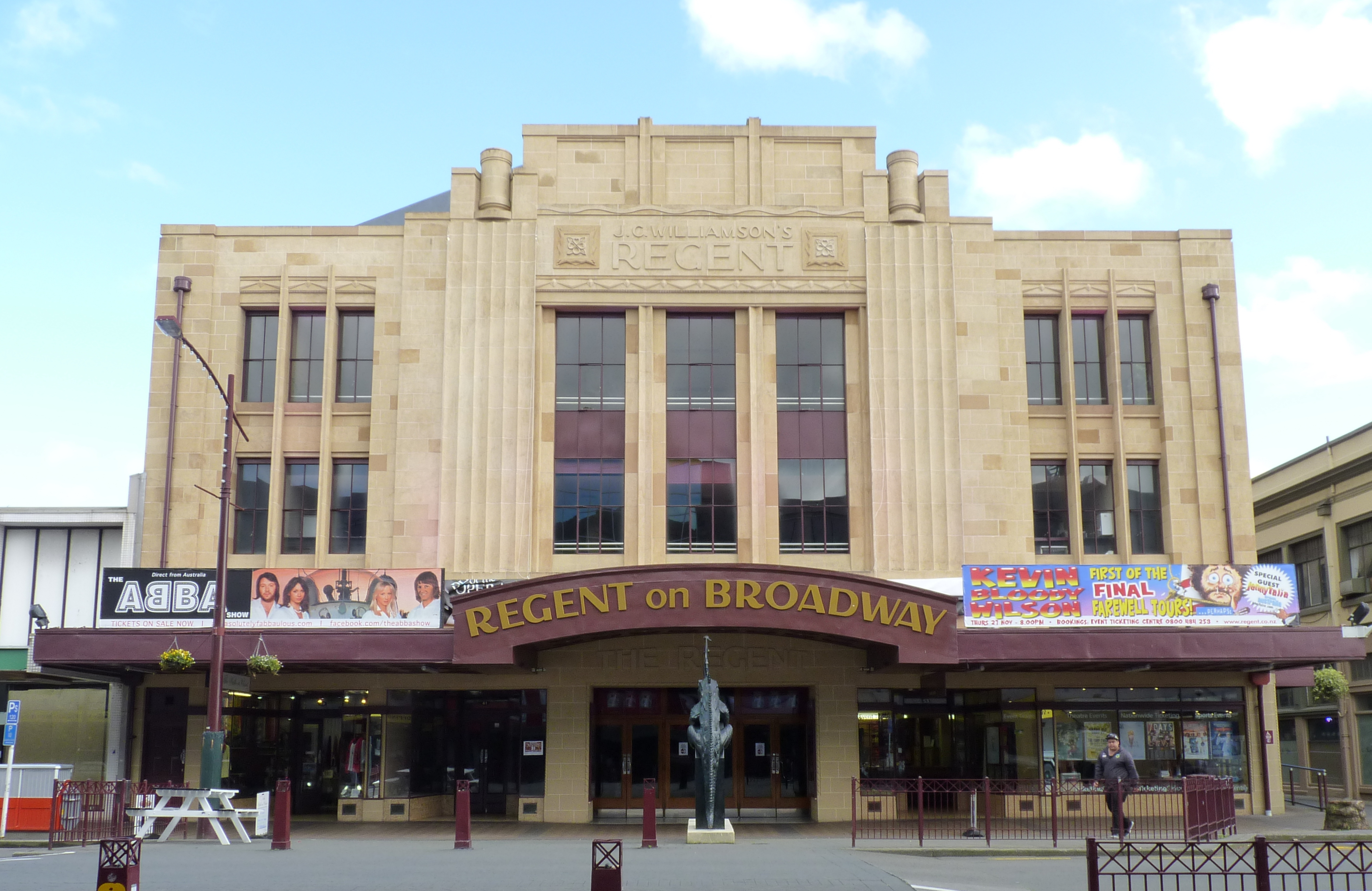
Regent Theatre, Palmerston North

=== Palmerston North ===
The Regent Theatre, Centrepoint Theatre and the Globe Theatre are three performing arts venues in Palmerston North.

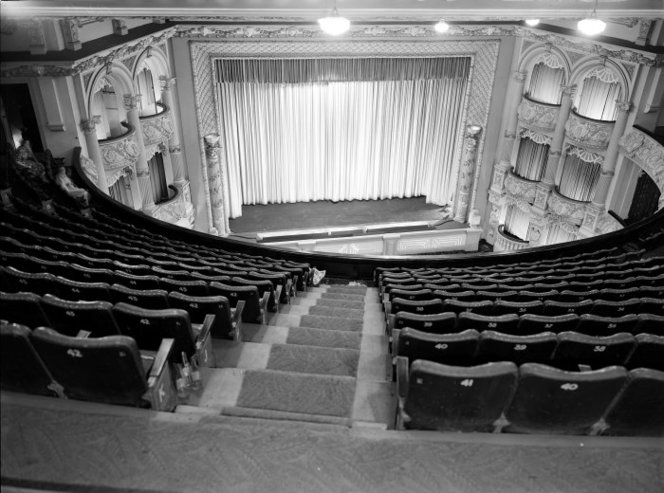
St James Theatre, Wellington

=== Wellington ===
In Wellington are a number of theatre venues. The smaller ones in Wellington City are BATS Theatre in a restored building, Circa Theatre on the waterfront, the Hannah Playhouse formally the home of Downstage Theatre and the Gryphon (84 seats), home of Stagecraft. The bigger venues are the Opera House, St. James Theatre, the Town Hall and the Michael Fowler Centre.

Wellington is also home to Te Whaea, in Newtown. This is the New Zealand National Dance and Drama Centre, and is home to the New Zealand School of Dance and Toi Whakaari: New Zealand Drama School.

In the Hutt Valley there is the Lower Hutt Little Theatre next to the War Memorial Library on Queens Drive, and in Upper Hutt is Whirinaki Whare Taonga (formally Expressions) an arts centre that includes a theatre.

=== Granity ===
The Lyric Theatre in Granity on the West Coast was bult in 1956 to replace a theatre that was destroyed in a fire. In 2014 the roof was blown off in Cyclone Ita and the community rallied to replace and upgrade the facility.

=== Christchurch ===
The Court Theatre moved from premises at the Christchurch Arts Centre to The Shed in Addington after the 2011 earthquake. It has planned a permanent home in the city centre. Built in 1908, the Isaac Theatre Royal is the only operational Edwardian style theatre remaining in New Zealand. It was closed for four years for repairs following earthquake damage, but reopened in 2014. The Ngaio Marsh Theatre in the student union building at the University of Canterbury opened in 1967, replacing The Little Theatre, which burned down in 1948. The Ngaio Marsh theatre was destroyed in the earthquake of 2011, and the rebuilt theatre reopened in 2019. The Odeon Theatre, Christchurch, a masonry building with a Category 1 heritage listing, opened as the Tuam Street Hall in 1883. It was partially destroyed by the earthquakes, although the facade has been retained.

The Loons is a venue in Lyttelton, located in a heritage building that was converted in 2007 to host music and performance events. It sustained significant damage in the 2011 Christchurch earthquake but was renovated and re-opened in 2021. The Lyttelton Arts Factory is a black box theatre located on the grounds of the Lyttelton Primary School and is a shared-use facility.

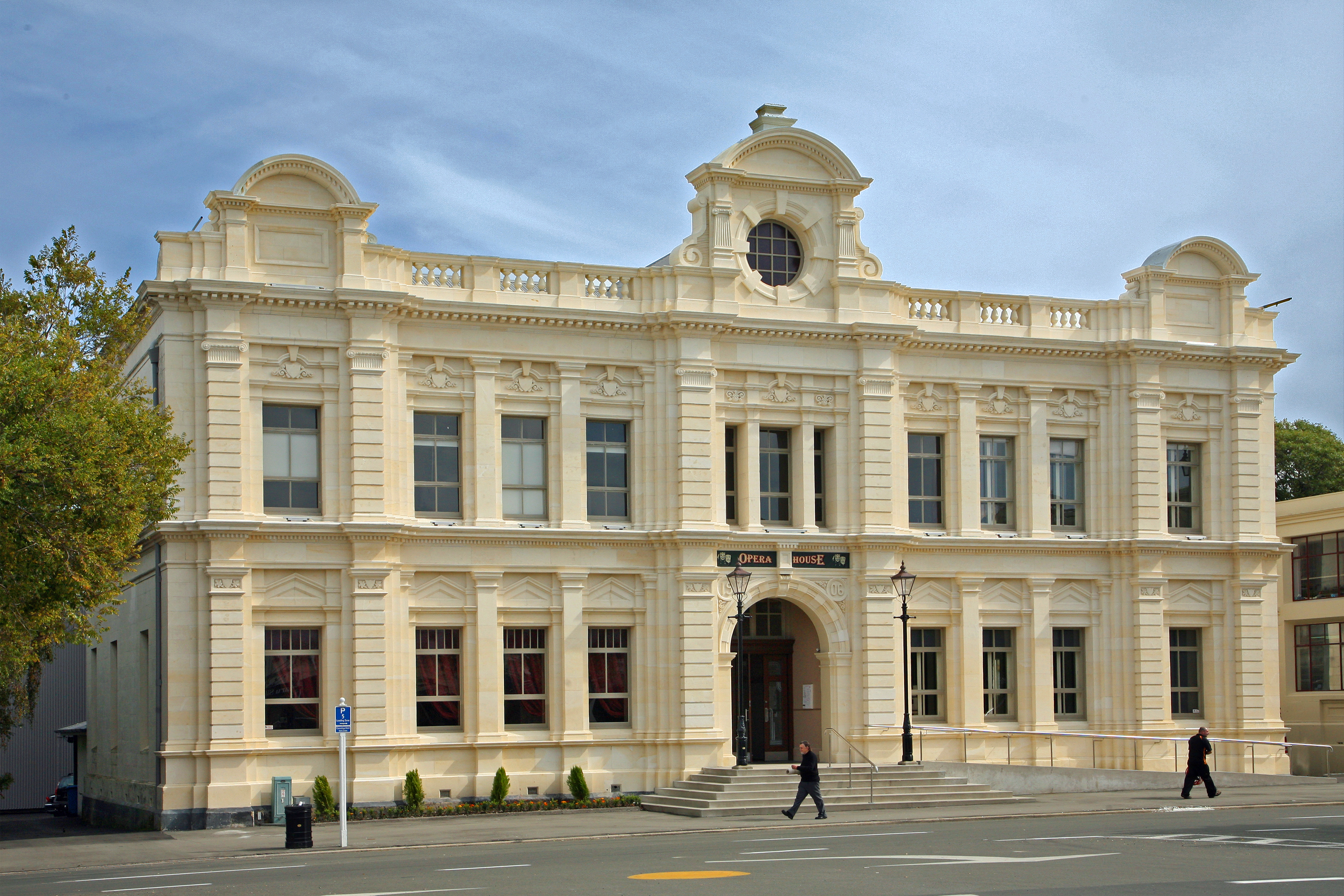
Oamaru Opera House

=== Oamaru ===
The Oamaru Opera House is a Category 1 listed historic building that opened in 1907, originally as the town hall, but is now an auditorium and performing acts venue.

=== Dunedin ===
The Globe Theatre, Dunedin was the first purpose-built theatre for repertory in New Zealand, when it was built in 1961. It may also have been the first in New Zealand built without a proscenium arch. Dunedin's Fortune Theatre was housed in an adapted church, with the wardrobe up the hill at King Edward Technical College, and the Regent Theatre in Dunedin was built as a cinema. Other venues in the city include Allen Hall theatre at the University of Otago, the Athenaeum, the Dunedin Town Hall, the Mayfair Theatre in South Dunedin, and the Playhouse Theatre, home of the Dunedin Repertory Society. There are several performing arts centres at high schools, notably Otago Boys' High School, Kavanagh College, and a shared performing arts centre for King's and Queen's High Schools.

=== Invercargill ===
The Civic Theatre complex presents touring companies and local organisations with an auditorium that can seat approximately 1000 people .
