= Mustn't Grumble =

Mustn't Grumble may refer to:

- Mustn't Grumble, a 1981 album by Chas & Dave
- Mustn't Grumble, a 1993 book by cartoonist Posy Simmonds
- Mustn't Grumble: An Accidental Return to England, a 2006 travel book by Joe Bennett
- Mustn't Grumble, a 2006 autobiography by Terry Wogan
