= Lyttelton Arts Factory =

Performance venue in New Zealand

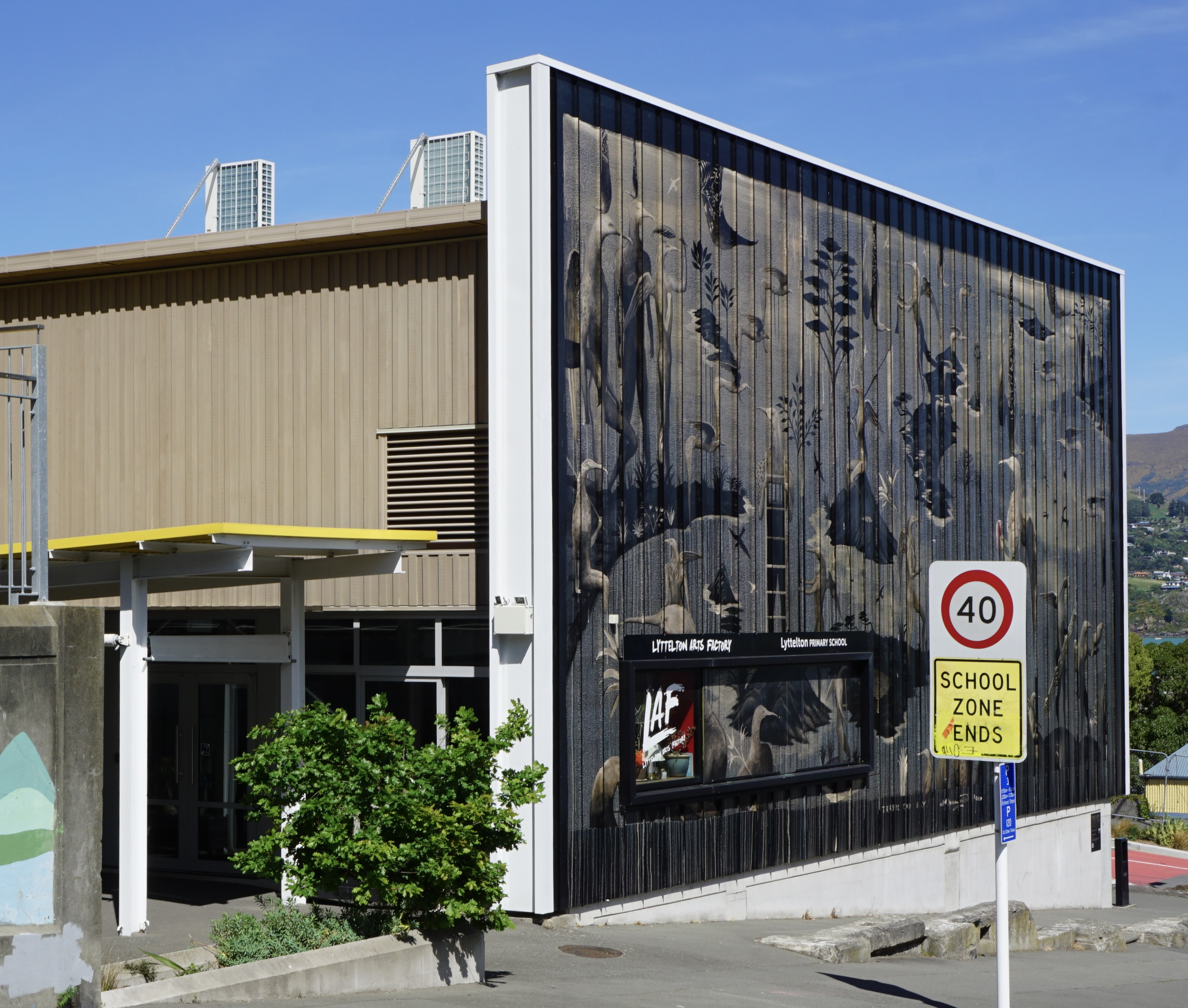
- Lyttelton Arts Factory from the north
- Interactive map of Lyttelton Arts Factory
- Address: 1 Sumner Road, Lyttelton; Christchurch; New Zealand
- Coordinates: 43°36′10″S 172°43′23″E

Website
- laf.co.nz

The Lyttelton Arts Factory (also known as LAF) is a performing arts events venue in Lyttelton, Christchurch, in the South Island of New Zealand. The venue is a black box theatre located on the grounds of the Lyttelton Primary School and is a shared-use facility. It is the school hall during the day but a performing arts theatre and teaching venue outside of school hours.

== History ==
From 2007 to 2011, the Loons Circus Theatre Company in Lyttelton staged over 400 events, ranging from community quiz nights and charity fund-raisers to children's shows and professional theatre. Their home venue was a historic building known as The Loons. In addition to adult theatre performances, the Loons venue was also used for teaching circus and theatre skills for children aged 5 to 14. The 2010 and 2011 Christchurch earthquakes caused damage to the Loons building and the theatre company was without a home. Planning for repair of the building began, but the theatre company was unable to reach agreement with the building owners over the terms for a new lease.

The Loons Circus Theatre Company then entered into an arrangement with the Lyttelton Primary School and the Ministry of Education to share in the development of a new dual purpose hall and performance theatre on school property on the corner of Oxford Street and Sumner Road. The theatre company obtained grant funding to help cover the costs of strengthening the new hall to make it suitable for circus work, and for installation of lighting rigs, retractable seating and theatre equipment. A major grant was also received from the Rata Foundation.

The new venue was opened in 2016 and was named as the Lyttelton Arts Factory. It is a fully-equipped black box theatre that can be adapted for multiple layouts and purposes. A cabaret night was held on 17 June 2016 to mark the theatre company performing in a permanent home for the first time in five years. The company's first season at the Lyttelton Arts Factory in July 2016 was Jim Cartwright's 1986 play Road. It was the company's first major show in five years. An adaptation of Charles Dickens Oliver Twist was staged in December 2016.

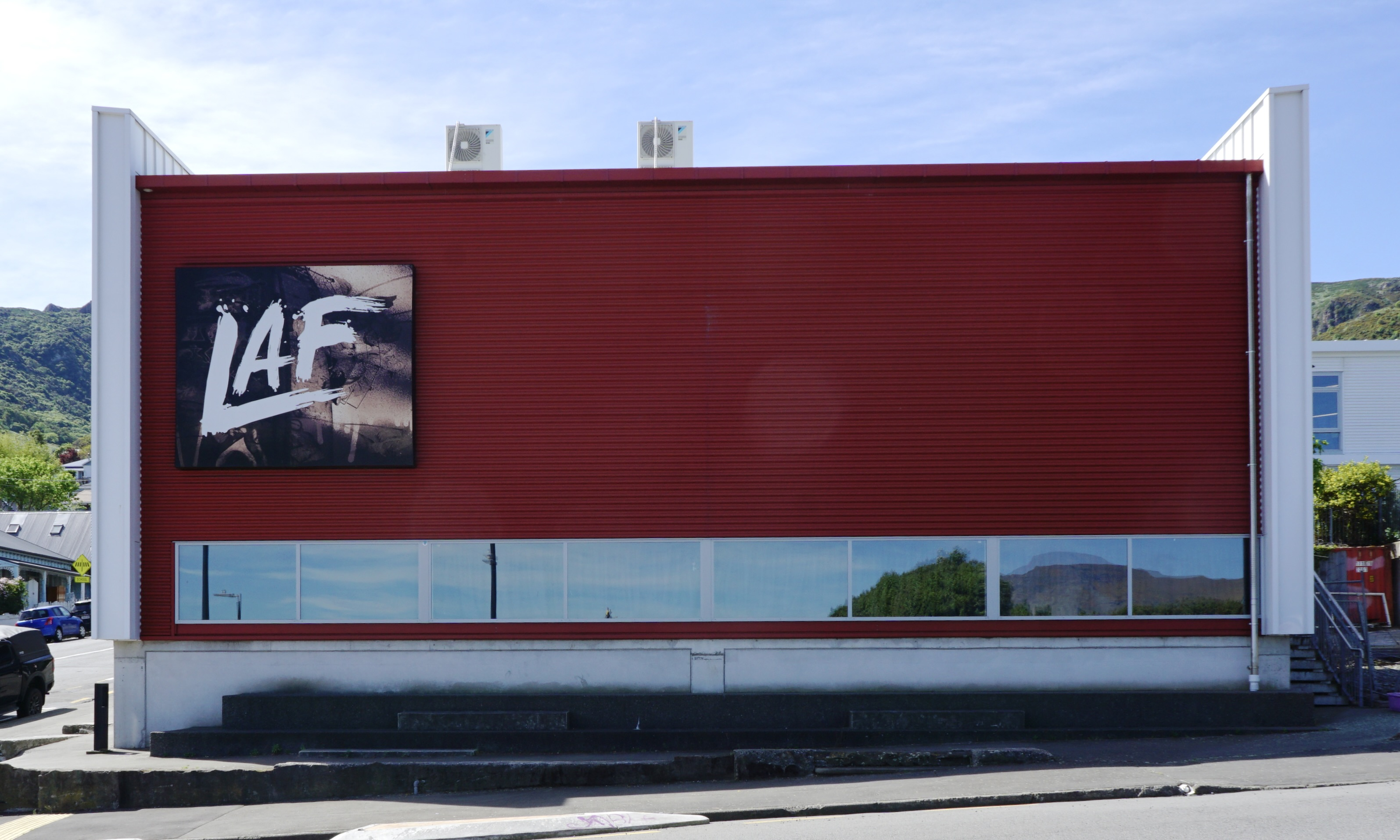
From the south

Since opening in 2016, the LAF venue has hosted a diverse range of performing arts including choir performances, dance, solo shows, bands, and independent drama productions. It has also hosted film festival screenings, and public meetings.

One of those who supported the new theatre facility was artist and former Lyttelton resident Bill Hammond. A reproduction of one of Bill Hammond's best known works, Traffic Cop Bay, named after an area near to the artist's home in Lyttelton, was installed on the Oxford Street frontage of the Lyttelton Arts Factory building in 2024. The work was reproduced on 41 vinyl drops, each 8 metres long.

The theatre company based at the LAF was renamed from The Loons Circus Theatre Company to the Lyttelton Circus Theatre Company in 2024.
