= Mayfair Theatre, Dunedin =

Theatre in Dunedin, New Zealand

Mayfair Theatre
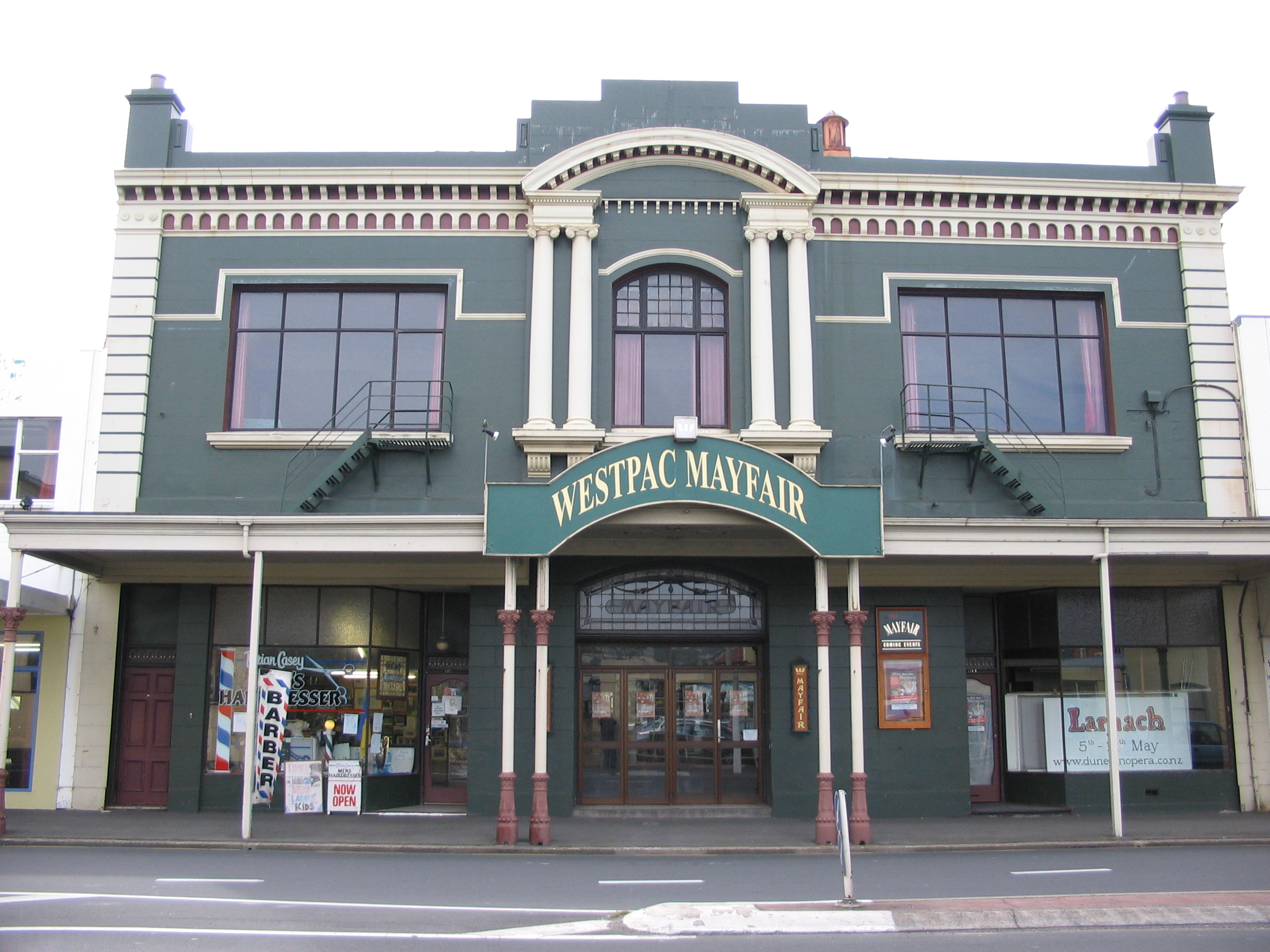
- The Mayfair Theatre in 2007
- Interactive map of the Mayfair Theatre area
- Former names: King Edward Picture Theatre

General information
- Type: Theatre
- Architectural style: Neoclassical
- Location: South Dunedin, 100 King Edward Street, Dunedin, New Zealand
- Coordinates: 45.89272°S 170.49830°E
- Completed: 1914
- Inaugurated: 7 December 1914
- Renovated: 1967

Technical details
- Structural system: Unreinforced masonry
- Floor count: two

Design and construction
- Architect: Edward Walter Walden

Heritage New Zealand – Category 2
- Designated: 5 December 2008
- Reference no.: 7786

References
- "King Edward Picture Theatre (Former)". New Zealand Heritage List/Rārangi Kōrero. Heritage New Zealand.

The Mayfair Theatre, Dunedin, New Zealand, was opened on 8 December 1914 as the "King Edward Picture Theatre". It is owned by the Mayfair Theatre Charitable Trust and serves as a 400-seat venue for live performances for a number of local community groups and as the Dunedin venue for some touring agencies.

It is located in King Edward Street, South Dunedin, close to the crossroads known as Cargill's Corner.

== History ==
The theatre was built as a purpose-designed cinema in 1914 by the King Edward Picture Theatre Company. This included some people prominent in Dunedin business such as William and Mary Ann Hudson of the eponymous confectionery company, the brewer Charles Speight and Robert and Charles Greenslade, also of the brewery (Speight's).

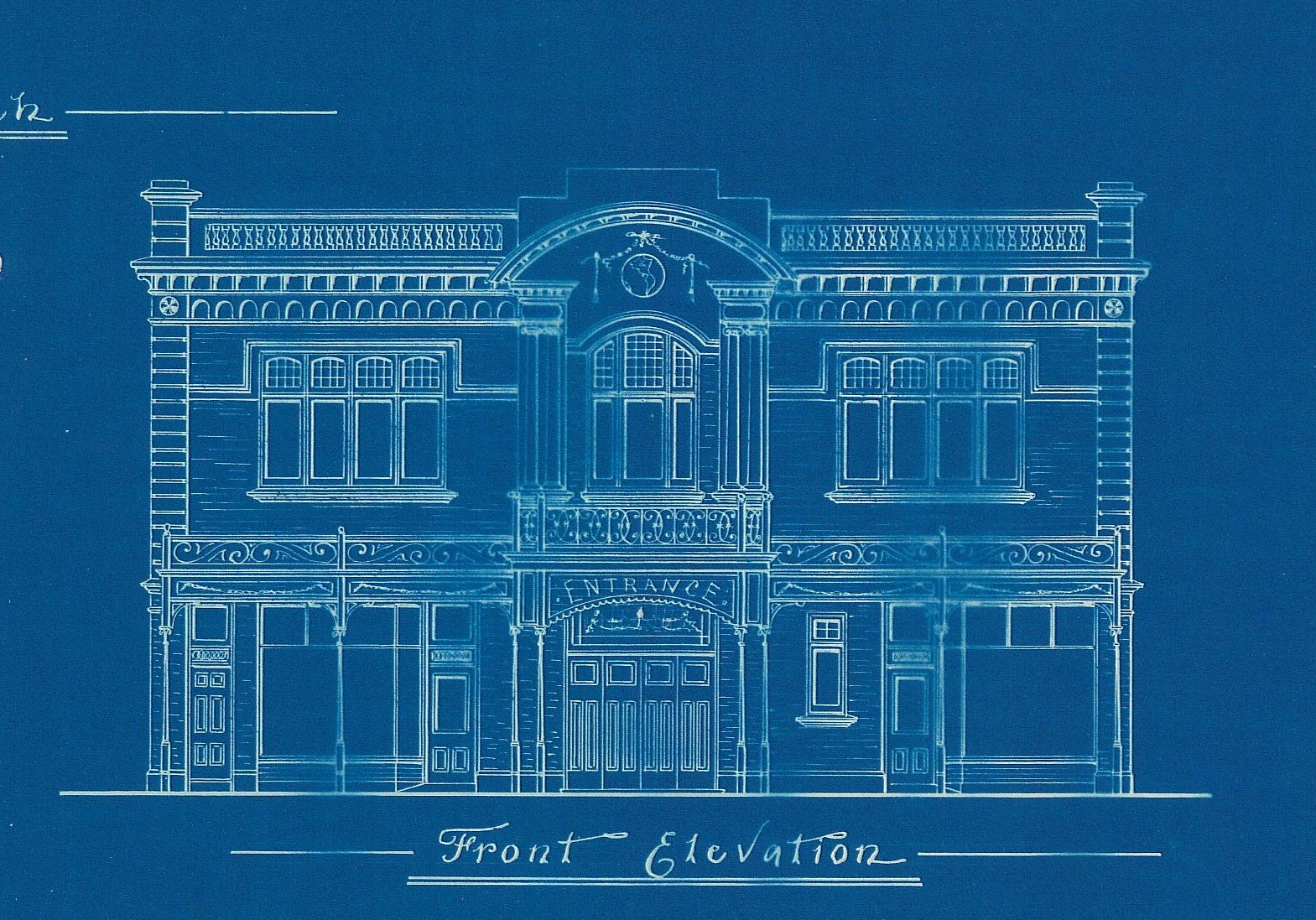
Mayfair Theatre permit plan, 1914. Dunedin City Council Archives.

The name overtly associated with the building's design is Edward Walter Walden (died 1944), but it seems to reflect the expertise and personal touch of Edmund Anscombe (1874–1948). This was early in the history of purpose-designed cinemas. While live venues had fan-shaped auditoria and deep stages behind the proscenium arch the Mayfair has the characteristic rectangular auditorium and originally small space behind the proscenium of a cinema. It was decorated with exuberant plasterwork by Robert Wardrop (1858–1924) which remains a striking feature of the interior. There are solemn faced caryatids, resembling respectable Dunedin matrons and personalised naked putti.

It was modified for sound in 1934 and renamed the Mayfair Theatre. The proscenium was altered, as was some plasterwork and new stained glass windows were introduced, in a re-fit designed by Llewellyn E. Williams. It was closed as a cinema on 25 September 1966.

The building was acquired by the Dunedin Opera Company in 1967 which converted it to a live venue. The seating capacity was reduced from 862 to 413 by removing the ground floor stalls and advancing the proscenium into the auditorium to achieve a greater stage depth. It has since been operated as a live theatre, particularly for opera.

By 2008 it was one of oldest three remaining buildings in New Zealand originally purpose-designed as cinemas, with the Princess Theatre in Gore (1913) and the Victoria Theatre in Devonport, Auckland (1912).

In 2008, a $20,000 state-of-the-art fire alarm system was installed with donations from several charities. Previously the code phrase "Mr Sands to report to the dressing rooms" would have been used to evacuate the building, but this was eventually disallowed by the Fire Service as not meeting legal requirements.

On 5 December 2008 the theatre was registered by the New Zealand Historic Places Trust as a Category II historic place.

== The theatre today ==
In 2013 the Mayfair Theatre Charitable Trust was formed from members of the Dunedin Opera Company and registered as a Charity on 15 October 2013. The Dunedin Opera Company then gifted the Mayfair Theatre to the Mayfair Theatre Charitable Trust on 30 June 2014 to separate the two groups and allow each to pursue their respective passions – Opera Otago pursuing its passion for performance, while the theatre trust pursues its passion for the Mayfair as a community venue.
