= Angela Cullen =

New Zealander physiotherapist and field hockey player

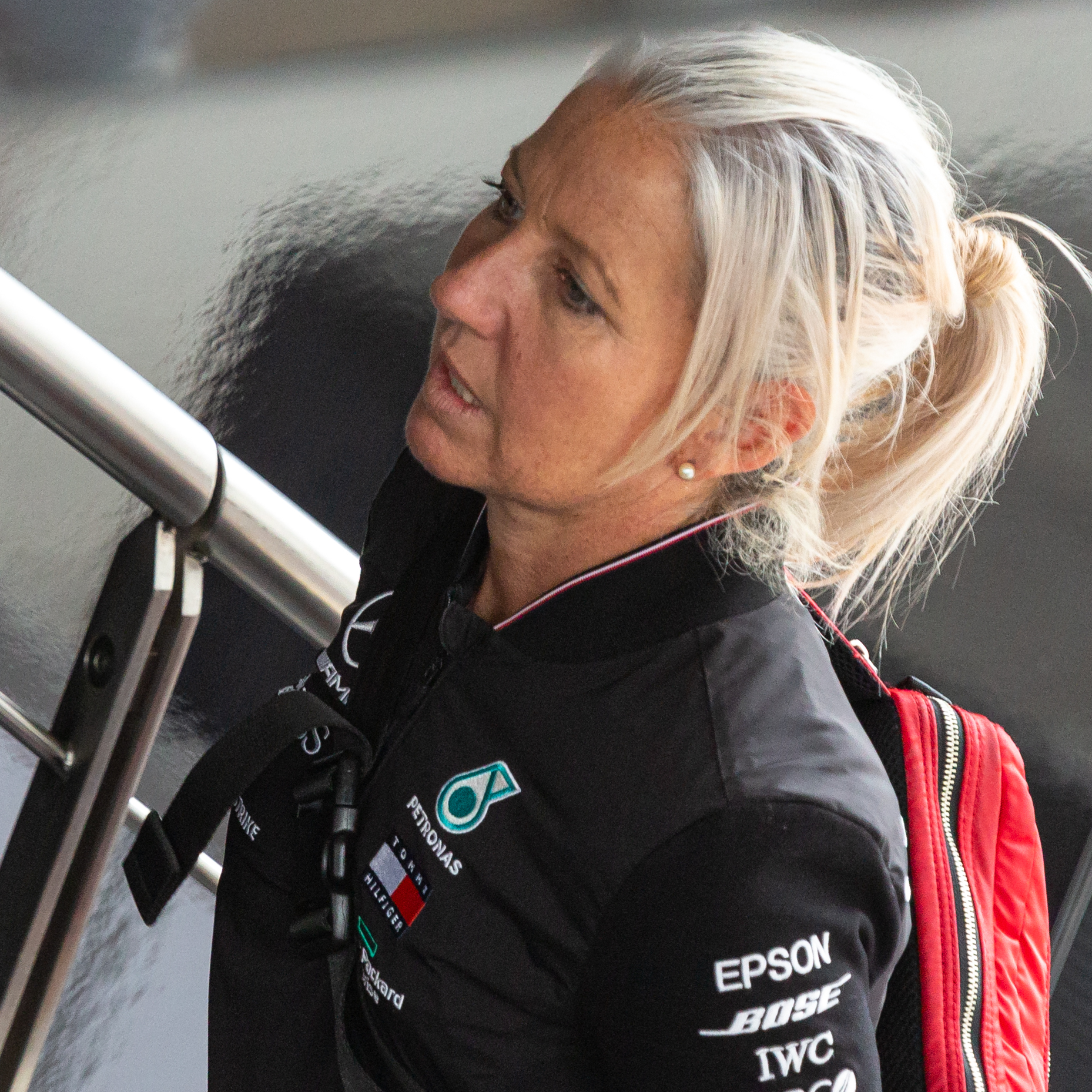
- Cullen in 2020
- Born: 5 August 1974 (age 51); Devonport, New Zealand
- Education: Auckland University of Technology
- Occupation: Physiotherapist
- Employer(s): Ferrari (2025–present); Mercedes-AMG (2016–2023)
- Known for: Physiotherapist to Lewis Hamilton
- Spouse: Silas Cullen
- Children: 3, two sons and daughter

Angela Cullen (born 5 August 1974) is a New Zealand physiotherapist and former field hockey player. From 2015 to March 2023, she worked for Hintsa Performance and Mercedes-AMG Petronas F1 Team. She is best known for being the physiotherapist to seven-time Formula One world champion Lewis Hamilton. From 2025, she has been working with him again now at Ferrari.

== Biography ==
Born in Devonport, New Zealand, August 5, 1974, Cullen played hockey at an international level for New Zealand between the ages of 15 and 21. She holds a degree in health science and physiotherapy.

Cullen worked at the English Institute of Sport in London as a senior physiotherapist, supporting the British Olympic team, UK Athletics the British triathlon team and other corporate clients. In the British Olympic team, she worked with 100 m and 200 m sprinters and the 4 × 100 m relay team, the latter going on to win a gold medal at the 2004 Summer Olympic games in Athens.

Cullen undertook a cycle tour in 2006 riding from Tierra del Fuego to Colombia, cycling up to 155 miles a day. She was later a senior advisor for SPARC High Performance in New Zealand. Cullen also worked with the New Zealand Academy of Sport and Sport New Zealand.

In 2015, Cullen joined the Hintsa Performance company. Following the death of Aki Hintsa, a mentor to Hamilton, she became Hamilton's physiotherapist and assistant. Cullen took up the role in 2016, also being described as his chauffeur and confidante.

On 17 March 2023, it was announced that Angela was moving on and would no longer work alongside Lewis Hamilton.

She then worked with Marcus Armstrong – who also hails from her homeland of New Zealand. During NBC's broadcast for the first-ever Thermal Club $1 Million Challenge event, the 50-year-old was spotted in the pit box of former Ferrari junior prospect Armstrong.

Following Lewis Hamilton's move to Ferrari for 2025, she is working with him again.

== Personal life ==
Cullen has 3 children, 2 sons and a daughter, and lives in the Alps region of France.
