= Mary Taylor (etcher) =

New Zealand artist

- Born: 1948 (age 77–78); Devonport, Auckland
- Education: University of Auckland, Massey University
- Known for: Painting, etching
- Notable work: Old Blue: The Rarest Bird in the World (book)
- Movement: Realism
- Awards: AIM Children's Book Awards - non-fiction award (1993)

Mary Taylor (born 1948) is a New Zealand artist and children's author.

== Background ==
Mary Taylor was born in Devonport, Auckland in 1948. She was educated at the University of Auckland and Massey University.

== Career ==
Formerly a teacher, Taylor has worked as a professional artist since 1983. Taylor is known for etchings and paintings. She follows a traditional process in her etchings, involving nitric acid, zinc plate, a manual etching press, and hand colouring each work. Her paintings primarily use acrylic and oils. Taylor's works are grounded in realism and are predominantly of New Zealand's flora and fauna.

Taylor has exhibited with the New Zealand Academy of Fine Arts and internationally, in New York and Beijing, as part of exhibitions of New Zealand art.

She is the author of Old Blue: The Rarest Bird in the World, winner of the AIM Children's Book Awards non-fiction award in 1994.
