= Lyttelton Circus Theatre Company =

Lyttelton theatre company

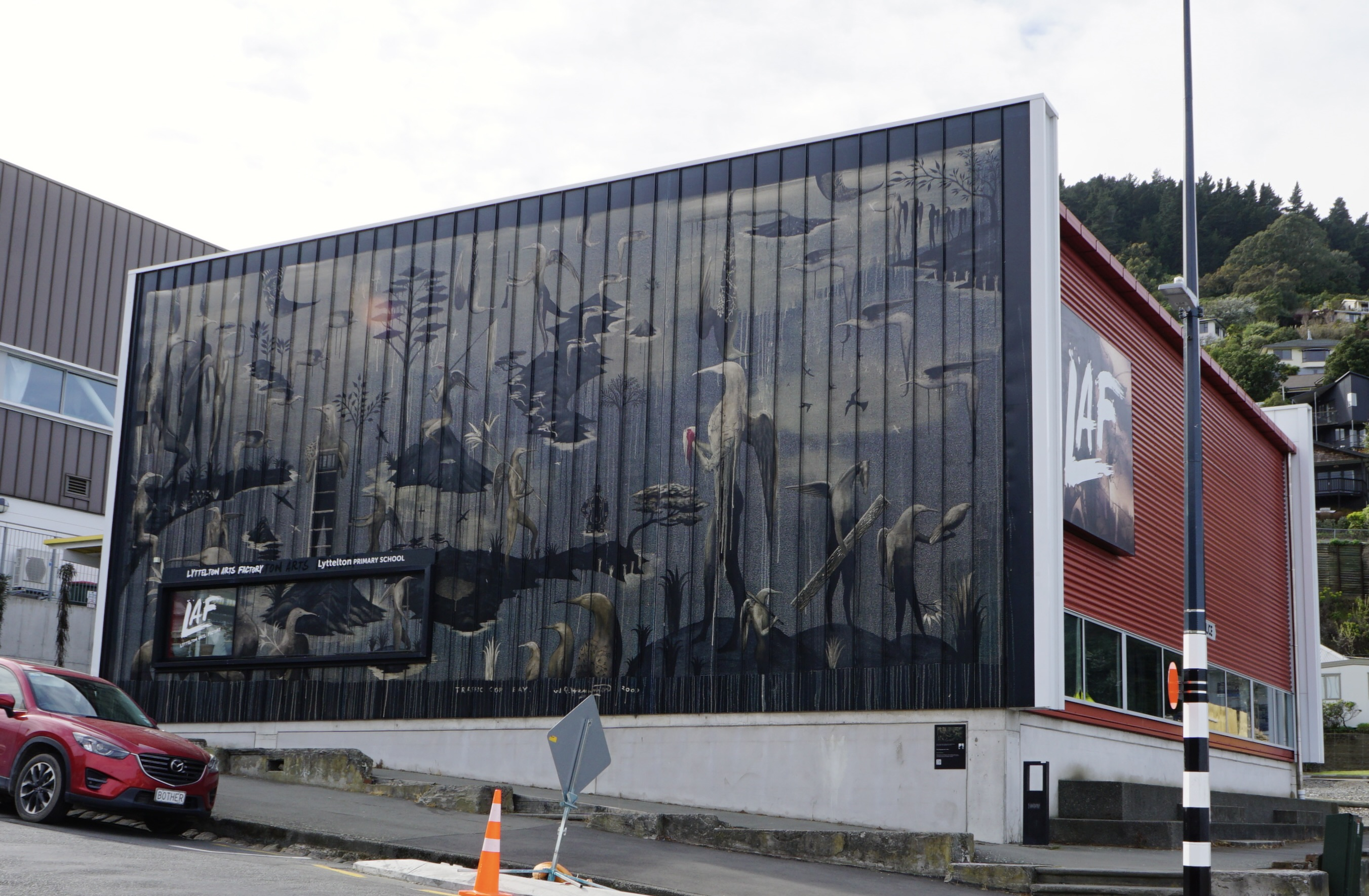
- The Lyttelton Arts Factory, home of the Lyttelton Circus Theatre Company
- Formation: 2006
- Type: Theatre group
- Location: Lyttelton, New Zealand
- Artistic director: Mike Friend
- Notable members: Joe Bennett
- Website: lytteltoncircustheatre.co

The Lyttelton Circus Theatre Company (formerly known as the Loons Circus Theatre Company, or The Loons) is a professional circus theatre company based in Lyttelton, New Zealand.

== Establishment ==
The Loons Circus Theatre Company, or The Loons, began in 2006 when theatre director Mike Friend and manager Darryl Cribb with support from writer and entertainer Joe Bennett took over the lease of the Lyttelton Working Men's Club building at 16 Canterbury Street, to develop it into a performing arts venue. They adopted the existing name of the building, The Loons, as the name for the theatre company. The opening performance was a cabaret with Joe Bennett, held on 31 March 2007. The theatre group used The Loons as a rehearsal space during the day, and members of the company provided waiter service for functions at night. Over 400 events were staged at the venue over a period of 5 years, ranging from community quiz nights and charity fund-raisers to children's shows and professional theatre. In addition to adult theatre performances, the venue was also used for teaching circus and theatre skills for children aged 5 to 14.

Between 2008 and 2010, the company staged performances of a work The Butler, written by Joe Bennett, that had been developed over several years. The original cast included David Ladderman, Tom Trevella and Pascal Ackermann. According to the reviewer for The Press, it was "an original and unique piece of art, with a strong foundation of physical theatre". After a 2010 season at The Loons, the work was staged in the James Hay Theatre in Christchurch and at the Fuel Festival in Hamilton, and went on tour to the Pleasance Theatre, London.

As part of 2009 Christchurch Arts Festival, the company staged a season at the James Hay Theatre of a work that included drama, music, circus and dance. Happy Home Road was an adaptation by Bennett of an absurdist play by the British playwright Paul Sellar. In 2010, the company also developed and staged a season of Berlin Burlesque based on the story of Erik Jan Hanussen in 1930s Berlin.

== Loss of The Loons venue ==
The September 2010 and 2011 Christchurch earthquakes caused damage to the Loons building leading to closure, and the theatre company was without a home.

Prior to the earthquakes, the Christchurch Arts Festival programme had included plans for a production of Macbeth to be staged in The Loons Theatre. Following the June 2011 earthquake, the production was moved to a temporary outdoor theatre constructed amongst the rubble and cleared land that had previously been the site of the Volcano Cafe and other Lyttelton businesses. Bennett had prepared a cut-down version of the original play, reducing the word count from 19,000 to 6,000, to suit a more visual style of performance. The performances in the temporary outdoor venue were supported by Project Lyttelton community earthquake funding. The season was sold out, and ran for three weeks from 23 August to 17 September 2011.

Despite the loss of their home venue, the company was able to stage performances in some other locations including the Christ's College Old Boys Theatre and the Nelson Arts Festival. Works included Stuck Up The Alley and The Butcher's Daughter, both written by Bennett. The company toured Berlin Burlesque - The Story of Hanussen in Nelson and Blenheim in October 2011. They also performed at the Sculpture on the Peninsula event held at Loudon Farm on Banks Peninsula in November 2011. There was a season of Hanussen - The Palace of Burlesque at the Mann Auditorium at the University of Canterbury in January 2012. There were 86 performances of Berlin Burlesque in 10 cities during 2011 and 2012.

The Lyttelton Working Men's Club began work on fundraising and plans for repairs of the damaged Loons building with support from the theatre company. However, the theatre company was unable to reach agreement with the Working Men's Club over the terms for a new lease.

== New home at Lyttelton Arts Factory ==
The theatre company entered into an arrangement with the Lyttelton Primary School and the Ministry of Education to share in the development of a new dual purpose hall and performance theatre on school property on the corner of Oxford Street and Sumner Road. The Loons obtained grant funding to cover the costs of strengthening the hall to make it suitable for circus work, and for installation of lighting rigs, retractable seating and theatre equipment.

The new venue was opened in 2016. A cabaret night was held on 17 June 2016 to mark the company performing in a permanent home for the first time in five years. The company's first season at the Lyttelton Arts Factory in July 2016 was Jim Cartwright's 1986 play Road. It was the company's first major show in five years. An adaptation of Charles Dickens Oliver Twist was staged in December 2016.

The company had a season of Let's Not Argue in June 2017, with a cast including David Ladderman and Lizzie Tollemache. In January 2018, the company revived and adapted its 2006 play The Butler with a new title The Butler Dresses Again. The production aimed to attract new audiences. in 2023, former members of the company were asked to come together again for a revised production of Berlin Burlesque. This led to further seasons of Berlin Burlesque at the Lyttleton Arts Factory in 2024 and 2025, and the show toured to Melbourne. The company was renamed from The Loons Circus Theatre Company to the Lyttelton Circus Theatre Company in 2024.

== Members of the company ==
The leaders of the company since its formation have been Mike Friend as artistic director, with Darryl Cribb as producer, and Joe Bennett as writer. Core members of the company have included:

- Pascal Ackermann
- Skye Broberg
- Sophie Ewert
- David Ladderman
- Tom Trevella
- Jola and Nele Siezen (also known as the Twisty Twinz)
- Daniel Lee Smith
