= Victoria Theatre, Devonport =

Cinema in Auckland, New Zealand

- The Victoria Theatre
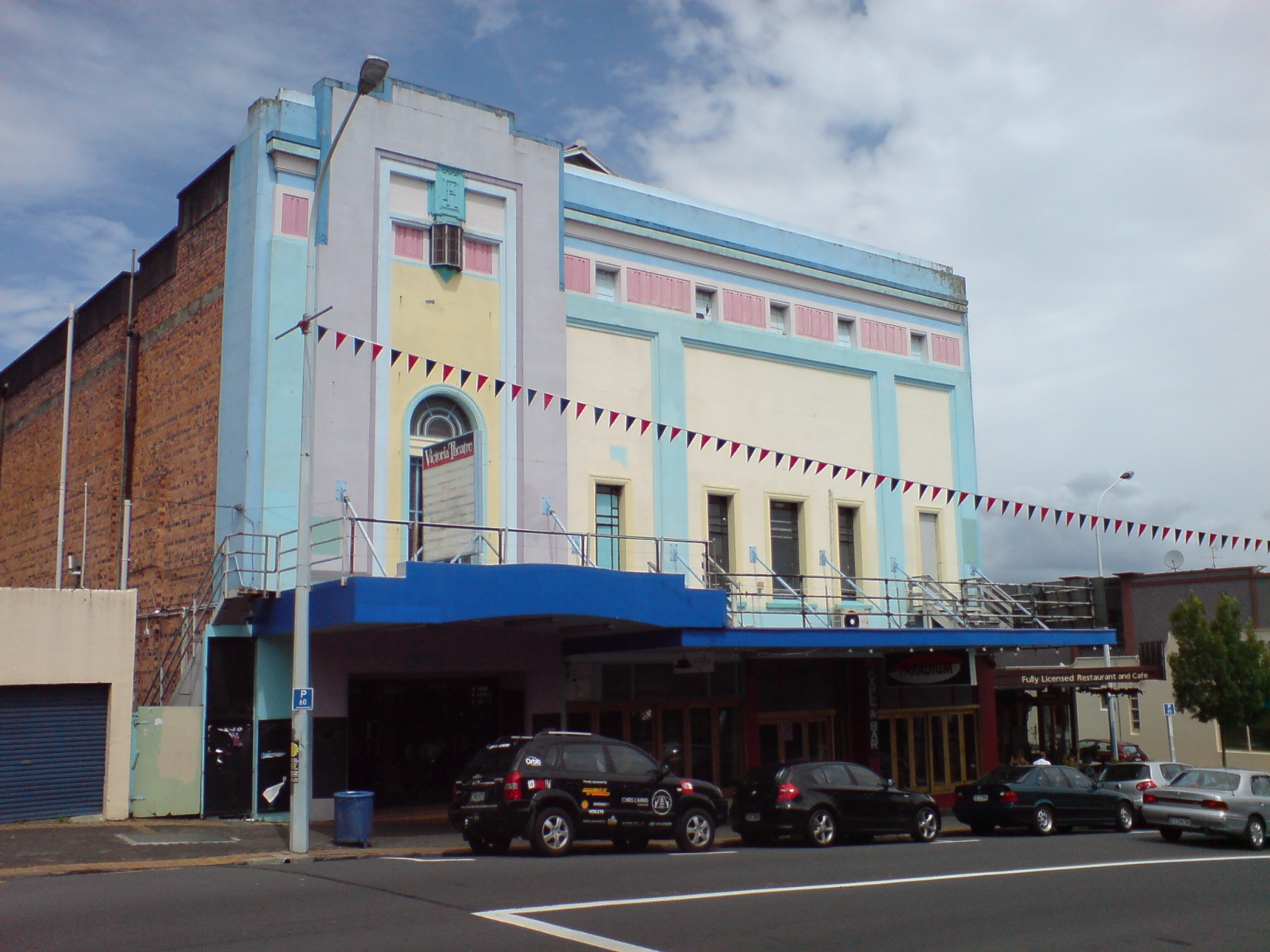
- The Vic, Devonport
- Interactive map of the Victoria Theatre, Devonport area
- Alternative names: The Vic

General information
- Type: Movie theatre; Performing arts venue
- Architectural style: Art Deco
- Location: 48 Victoria Road, Devonport, Auckland 0624, Auckland, New Zealand
- Coordinates: 36°49′45″S 174°47′53″E
- Inaugurated: 1912

Design and construction
- Architect: John Walker

Other information
- Seating capacity: 386

Heritage New Zealand – Category 1
- Reference no.: 7712

The Victoria Theatre, in Devonport, Auckland, New Zealand, is both the country's and the Southern Hemisphere's oldest surviving purpose-built cinema, dating from 1912. It was extensively refurbished in 2010.

== History ==
The Victoria Theatre was built in 1912 for American John Leon Benwell, and originally held a capacity of 965. In 1914 John Benwell sold the theatre to Fuller-Haywards Picture Company. The building was remodelled after a fire in 1924. In 1929, Fuller-Haywards converted the building to allow for the new talking pictures.

The Victoria was taken over by Kerridge Odeon in 1945. Kerridge ran the theatre until 1988, when dwindling patronage saw the building put up for sale. Publisher Bruce Palmer, who acquired the theatre, converted it into Charley Gray's Twin Cinemas Devonport, with three separate cinema theatres. The Victoria changed ownership several times in the following years, before a threat to turn it into an apartment complex in the early 2000s saw the creation of the Victoria Theatre Trust. The trust persuaded the then North Shore City Council to purchase the building, and reopened the venue as a cinema and live venue.

== Architecture ==
The theatre was originally designed by Auckland architect John Walker and erected for £6,000, just two years after the country's first purpose-built cinema. The complex was built by Edward James for £6,500. Remodelling to accommodate sound technology in 1929 was to a design by Daniel Patterson. Patterson's changes included enlarging the previous building, with major changes to both interior and exterior. Much of the building's current Art Deco exterior dates from this time. The building has a Heritage New Zealand Historic Place Category 1 status.

== The theatre today ==
The building currently contains four cinema theatres (total capacity 386) plus a live venue space.
