= Baycourt Community and Arts Centre =

Performing arts venue in Tauranga, New Zealand

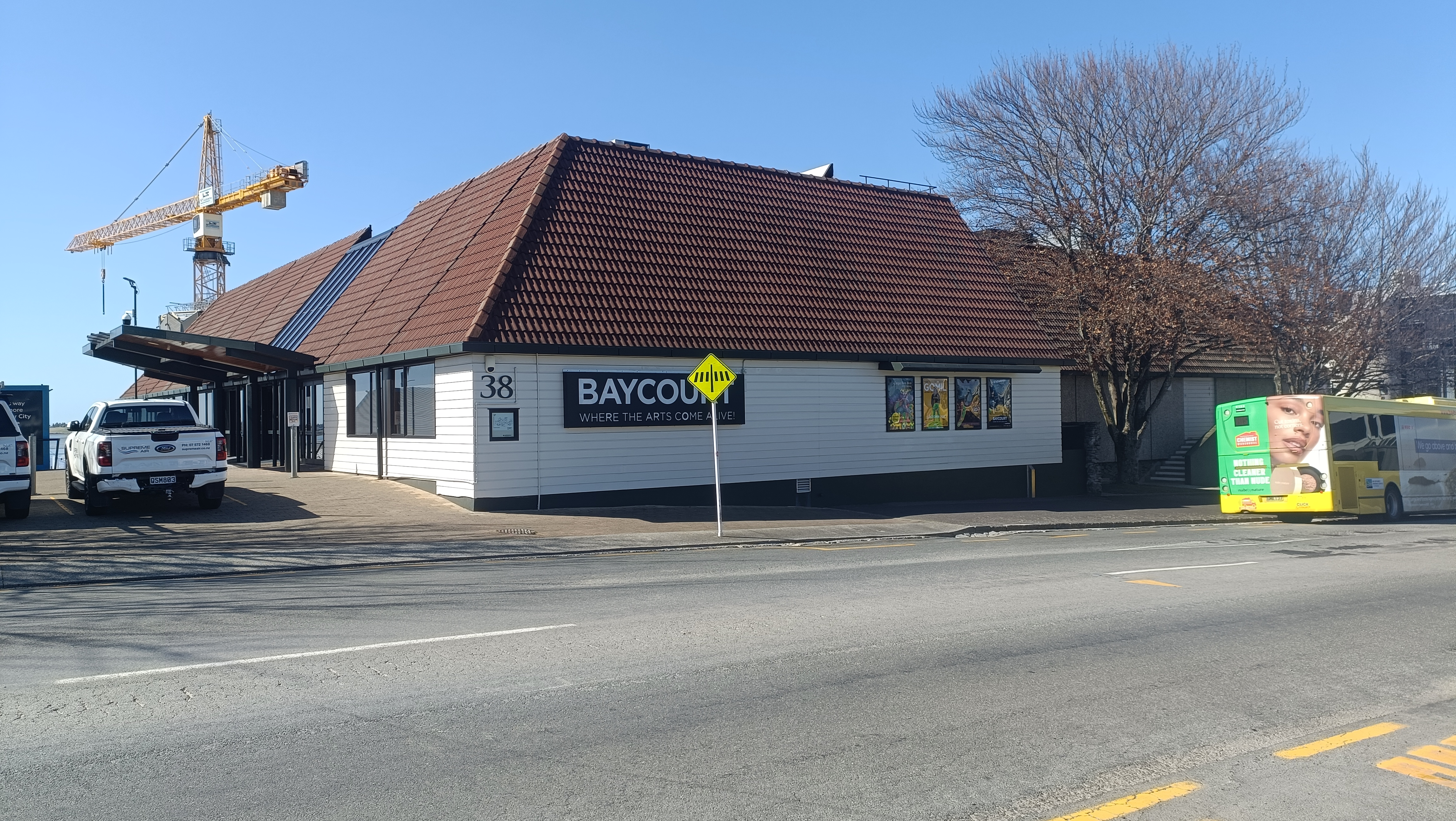
- Interactive map of the Baycourt Community and Arts Centre area

General information
- Type: Performing arts and theatre venue
- Location: 38 Durham Street, Tauranga, New Zealand
- Coordinates: 37.6832°S 176.1676°E
- Construction started: October 1981
- Opened: 26 April 1983

Design and construction
- Architect: Warren and Mahoney

Website
- www.baycourt.co.nz

Baycourt Community and Arts Centre is a multi-purpose performing arts and theatre facility in Tauranga, New Zealand. It was designed by Warren and Mahoney, and has a main auditorium, the Addison Theatre, that seats 589. The Addison Theatre is named after Bob Addison, chairman of a group of local residents who formed the Tauranga Community Arts Council and developed the original proposal for a community and arts centre in 1974. It took nine years of fundraising and planning before the centre was built and officially opened in 1983.

Warren and Mahoney won an award for their design, from the Waikato Bay of Plenty branch of the New Zealand Institute of Architects.

One of the unusual features of Baycourt is its Wurlizter organ. The instrument is a 1926 Mighty Wurli (2/10 Wurlitzer Model H Opus 1482). It was originally installed in a theatre in Wellington, then moved to a shed in Tokoroa, and then into the former Tauranga Town Hall before being installed in Baycourt.

Baycourt also has a Steinway D-274 concert grand piano, purchased in 2009. Fundraising to purchase the piano was organised by the Tauranga Regional Concert Piano Trust. In 2017 and 2018, Friends of Baycourt organised open days where members of the public had an opportunity to play the instrument.
