= Westpoint Performing Arts Centre =

Performing arts venue in Auckland, New Zealand

Coordinates: 36.8595°S 174.7164°E

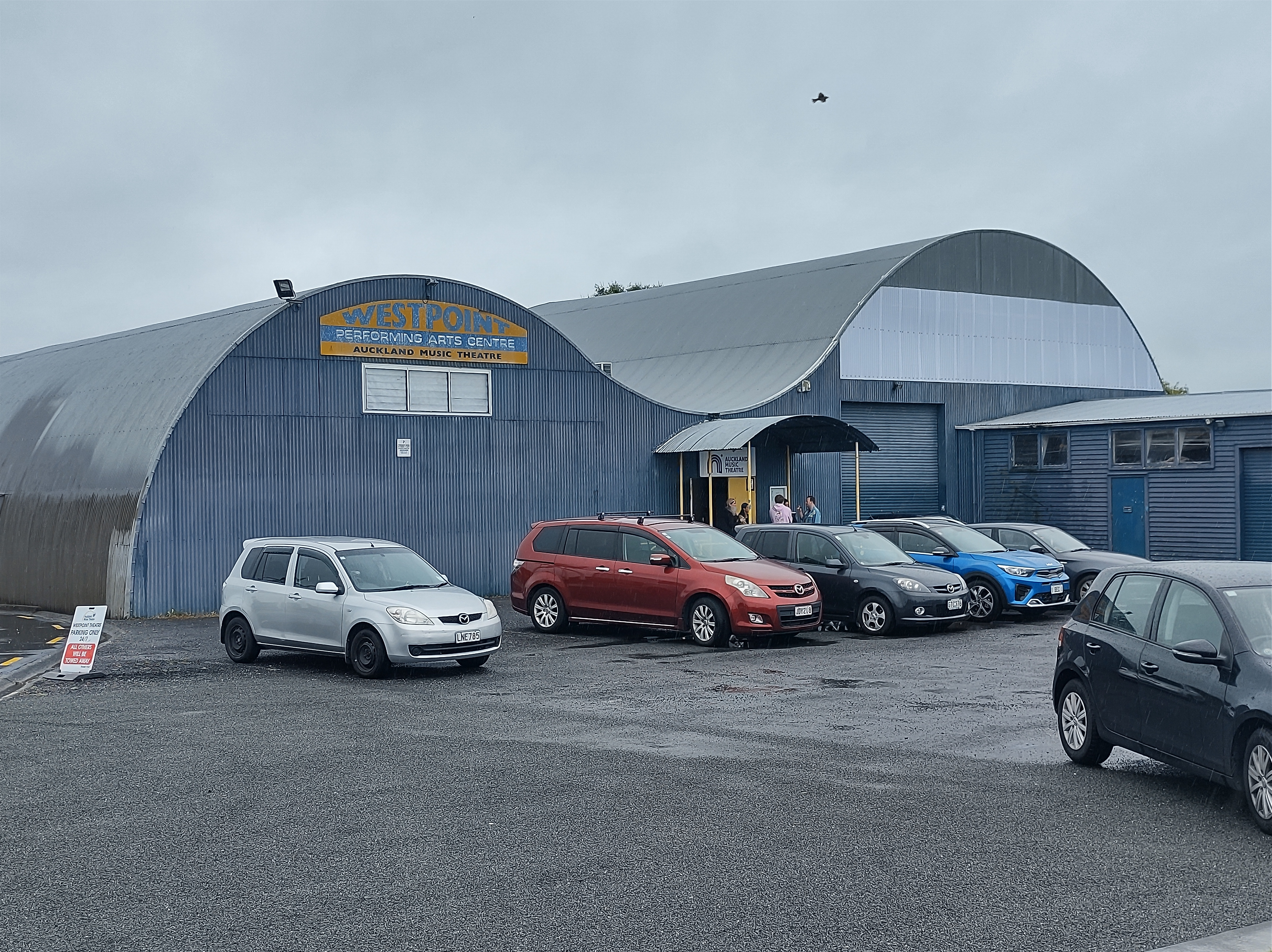
Westpoint Performing Arts Centre in Port Chevalier, Auckland, New Zealand

The Westpoint Performing Arts Centre is a venue located in Point Chevalier, Auckland, New Zealand used for theatrical performances and rehearsals.

== Building location and name ==
The venue shares the MOTAT 2 (Museum of Transport and Technology - Aviation Section) Carpark, and is located at 190 Meola Road, Point Chevalier. Access is also available from Motions Road, Western Springs, or via the Motat Western Springs Tramway.

Legend says that the building was named 'Westpoint' because it is located right on the border between three Auckland suburbs - Western Springs, Westmere, and Point Chevalier. The land that the building was built on was once a rubbish dump, and methane gas monitoring stations can still be seen outside the building today.

== Ownership ==
The building is owned by The Auckland Musical Arts Trust and administered by Auckland Music Theatre Incorporated who use the building as their own 'home base'. Auckland Council own the land which the building sits on.

== Building usage and layout ==
The performance space within the venue seats approximately 120 patrons, however the building has a number of spaces which can be configured to suit smaller, or larger numbers of patrons.
