= Devonport, New Zealand =

Devonport
- Suburb
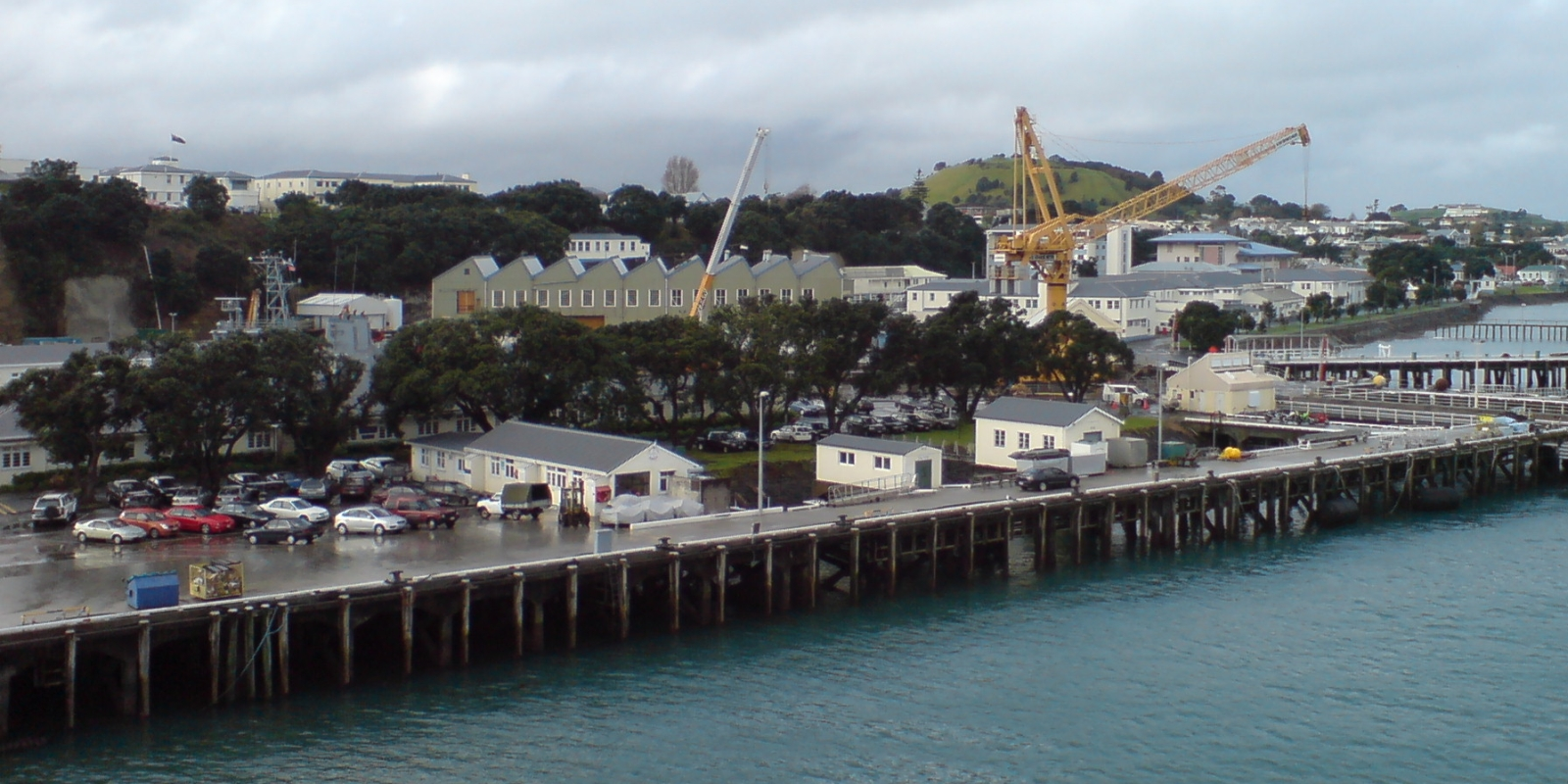
- Devonport Naval Base with Mount Victoria visible in background
- Interactive map of Devonport
- Coordinates: 36.831667°S 174.796278°E
- Country: New Zealand
- City: Auckland
- Local authority: Auckland Council
- Electoral ward: North Shore ward
- Local board: Devonport-Takapuna Local Board
- Established: 1841

Area
  - Land: 189 ha (470 acres)

Population (June 2025)
  - Total: 5,090
  - Density: 2,690/km^{2} (6,980/sq mi)
- Postcode: 0624
- Ferry terminals: Devonport Wharf
- Hospitals: Navy Hospital

(Ngataringa Bay)	Narrow Neck	(Rangitoto Channel)
Stanley Point	Devonport	(Rangitoto Channel)
(Waitematā Harbour)	(Waitematā Harbour)	(Waitematā Harbour)

Devonport (/ˈdɛvənpɔːrt/ DEV-ən-port) is a harbourside suburb of Auckland, New Zealand. It is located on the North Shore, at the southern end of the Devonport Peninsula that runs southeast from near Lake Pupuke in Takapuna, forming the northern side of the Waitematā Harbour. East of Devonport lies North Head, the northern promontory guarding the mouth of the harbour.

The suburb hosts the Devonport Naval Base of the Royal New Zealand Navy, the main facility for the country's naval vessels, but is also known for its harbourside dining and drinking establishments and its heritage charm.

== Etymology ==
Devonport is named after the English naval town of Devonport.

Eastern Devonport is known as Cheltenham, named after the English town of Cheltenham.

== Geography ==
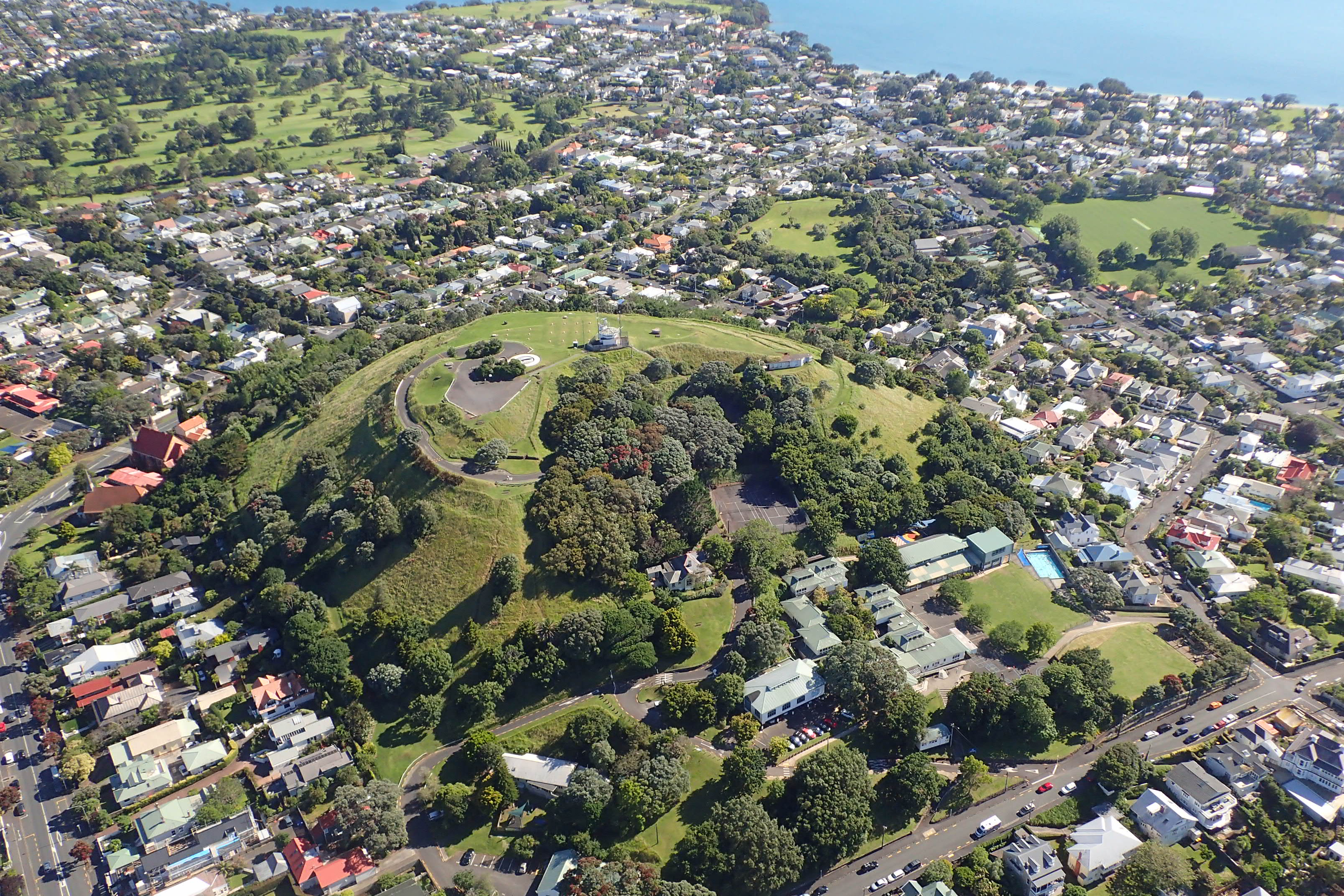
Aerial view of Takarunga / Mount Victoria in 2018

Devonport is a peninsula at the mouth of the Waitematā Harbour on the North Shore of Auckland. It is surrounded by Ngataringa Bay to the northwest, the Waitematā Harbour mouth to the south, and the Rangitoto Channel of the Hauraki Gulf to the east.

The suburb of Stanley Point can be found to the west of Devonport, while the suburbs of Narrow Neck and Vauxhall are found to the north. The northwestern section of Devonport is located at Duders Point, a peninsula within Ngataringa Bay.

The suburb has three beaches: Devonport Beach and Duders Beach to the south, and Cheltenham Beach to the northeast.

Devonport is home to three volcanoes of the Auckland volcanic field: Takarunga / Mount Victoria, Maungauika / North Head and Takararo / Mount Cambria. Of these three volcanoes, Maungauika / North Head is the oldest, estimated to have last erupted around 87,500 years ago. Takaroro / Mount Cambria and Takarunga / Mount Victoria are estimated to have last erupted 42,300 and 34,800 years ago respectively. Takarunga / Mount Victoria is the taller of the volcanoes, reaching a height of 81 metres (266 ft), with Maungauika / North Head reaching a height of 65 metres (213 ft). Takararo / Mount Cambria formerly stood at a height of 30 metres (98 ft), but was quarried in the 1870s. Another scoria cone, the 20 metres (66 ft) high Duders Hill, believed to be a section of Takarunga / Mount Victoria, was quarried in the early 20th century.

== History ==
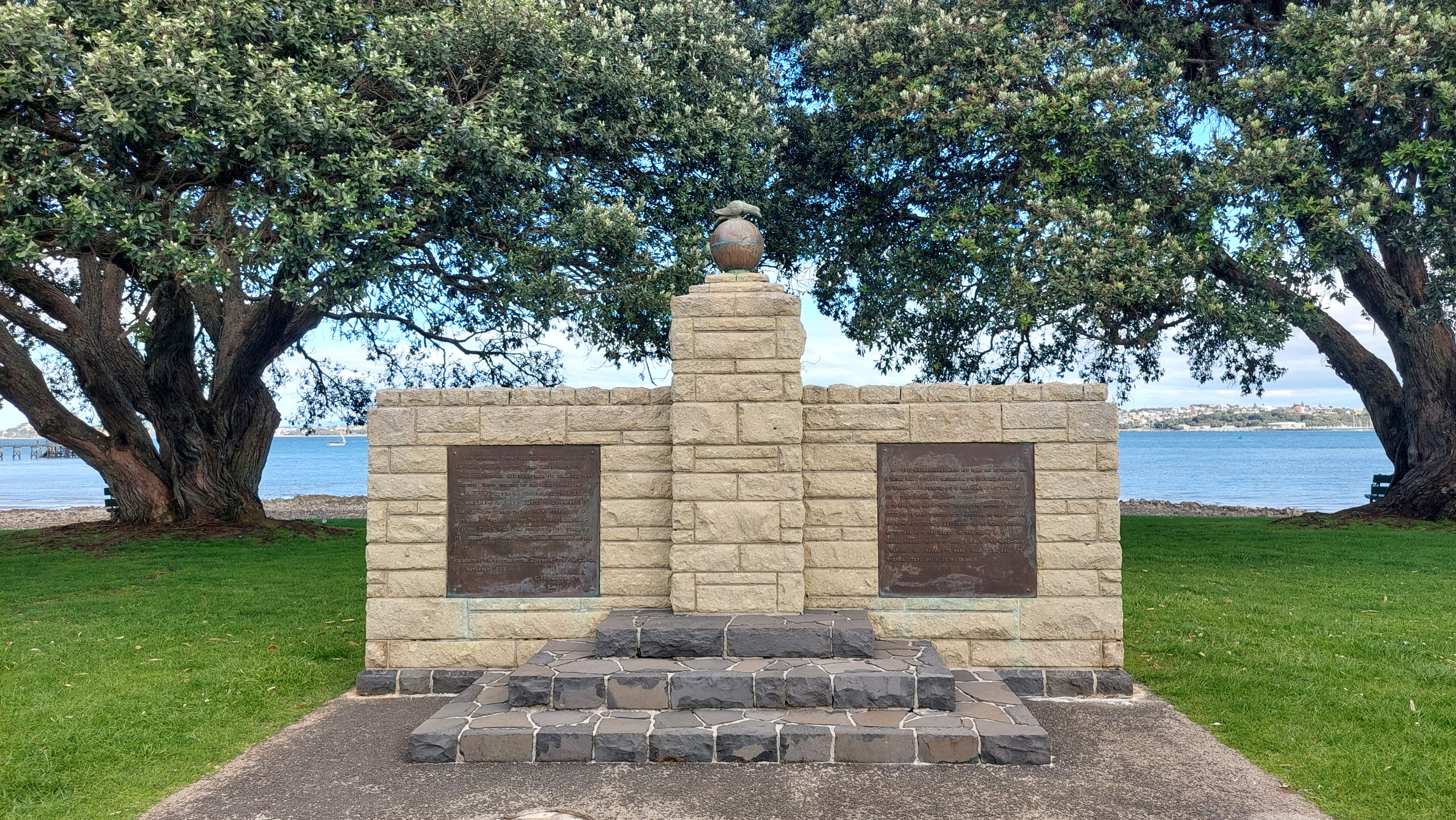
Tainui Landing Memorial, marking the spot where the Tainui migration canoe landed c.1350.

Around 40,000 years ago Devonport consisted of three islands of volcanic origin, Mount Victoria, North Head and between them Mount Cambria (now largely quarried away).

The earliest evidence for Māori settlement dates from the mid-14th century (roughly the same time as the believed landing of the Tainui migration canoe, which is commemorated by a stone memorial on the foreshore). A significant Māori settlement on North Head was ended by attacks from rival tribes in the 1790s. About 50 Māori were still living in Torpedo Bay, with their meeting house just east of Cambridge Terrace, until they fled to the Waikato when the colonial government launched war on Waikato Māori in 1863.

Jules Dumont d'Urville, a French explorer, is thought to have gone ashore in the area in 1827, possibly as the first European. The first European building on the foreshore was a gunpowder magazine built in 1840.

Devonport is one of the oldest colonial settlements in Auckland, and the first on the North Shore. The Royal Navy survivors of HMS Buffalo settled at Devonport. In 1841 a signal station for Auckland's shipping was erected on Mount Victoria (Takarunga), and the signal master, Robert Snow, and his family became the first Europeans to live in the area permanently. From then until the 1860s, the settlement was called Flagstaff, because of the flagstaff at the signal station. Flagstaff was subdivided for town sections and farms in the early 1850s.

For the first half century or so of its existence Devonport was geographically isolated from the rest of the North Shore, and was sometimes called "the island" by the local inhabitants. Only a thin strip of land beside the beach at Narrow Neck connected Devonport to Belmont and the rest of the North Shore peninsula. In the late 19th century the mangrove swamp that stretched from Narrow Neck to Ngataringa Bay was filled in to form a racecourse, now a golf course. A new road was built along the western edge of the racecourse allowing more direct travel to the north.

On the southern shore, to the west of the centre of Devonport, a nearby deep water anchorage suitable for Royal Navy vessels, the Devonport Naval Base was established in 1841. William Hobson, then the Governor of New Zealand, considered the sandspit-protected area a better choice for a naval installation than the shallower waters on the southern side of the Waitematā Harbour. While some facilities have expanded and shifted in location over time, the area is still the primary base for the Royal New Zealand Navy. The Calliope Dock at Stanley Bay, part of the base, was opened on 16 February 1888 and at the time was the largest dock in the Southern hemisphere. The suburb also had one of the oldest New Zealand shipyards, now part of the Devonport Yacht Club area.

The main centre of the suburb slowly shifted west from Church Street and the original wharf at Torpedo Bay, to its current location around the ferry wharf. The settlement itself was renamed Devonport by 1859 after the English naval town of Devonport. Devonport achieved Borough status in 1886 and was incorporated into North Shore City in 1989.

Devonport played a special role in the nuclear free movement. In 1981 the Devonport Borough Council voted to declare Devonport a nuclear-free zone, the first local council in New Zealand to do so.

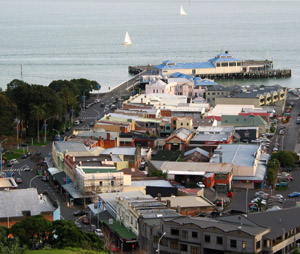
Devonport as seen from Mt Victoria. Victoria Road on left, Devonport Wharf at the rear.

In July 2007, Devonport was given permission to be excluded from a list of local Auckland growth node centres. The Auckland Regional Council accepted that while it was encouraging intensified growth (such as higher-density housing) around transport nodes such as Devonport, the character and historical nature of the Devonport Wharf area would make such a designation inappropriate in this case.

=== Ferries ===
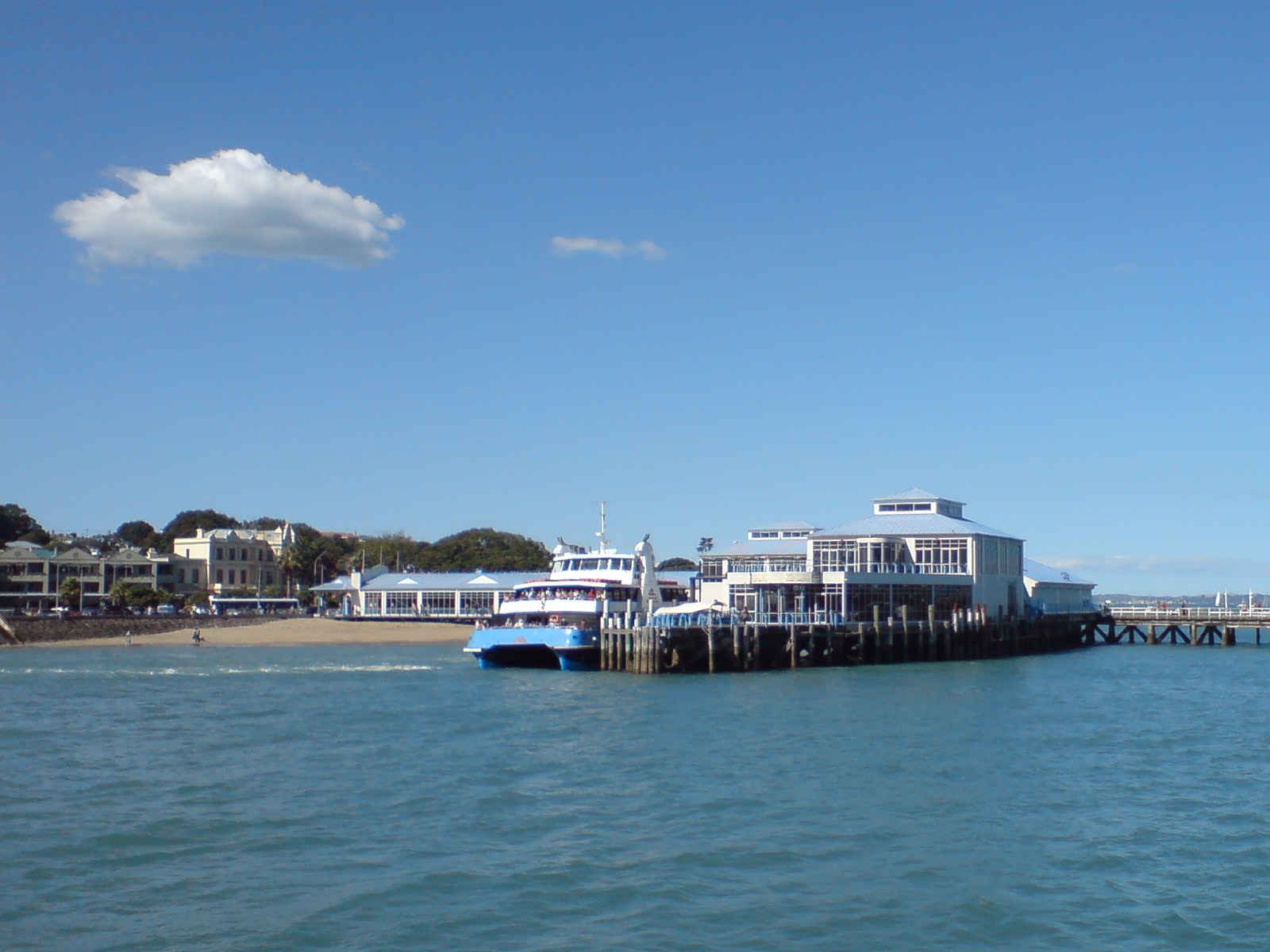
The Kea at Devonport Wharf

The first ferry services to Auckland city began in the 1840s. These were open sailing cutters operated by local seamen running passengers to the foot of Queen Street, Auckland's main road. In 1860 the first paddlesteamer ferries began operation. These were in turn replaced by double-ended, screw-driven ferries in 1904. Both passenger and vehicle ferries operated on the Devonport run until the opening of the Auckland Harbour Bridge in 1959. Immediately after the opening of the bridge, passenger ferry services to other North Shore destinations (such as Northcote and Birkenhead) were cancelled, as were all vehicular ferries. The Devonport passenger ferry was retained on a much reduced timetable. The majority of the ferries were scrapped, only a handful being retained until being replaced by more modern vessels. The last of the old-style double-ended ferries, the diesel-engined Kestrel (built in 1905), was retired from the commuter run in 1988 and was then operated for cruises and sightseeing.

In 2002 the Kestrel was moved to Tauranga to serve as a floating restaurant. The Kestrel changed hands again in 2010 and moved back to Auckland. On 8 March 2016 the Kestrel broke up and sank while tethered in its Wynyard Quarter berth. She was refloated, but her future remains uncertain.

== Character ==
Devonport maintains many old villas some of which date back to the 19th century.

The navy base at Devonport features strongly in the local character, with the North Shore City Council having signed a Memorandum of Understanding with the Navy which recognises the developing partnership between them. The Torpedo Bay Navy Museum is also located in Devonport.

== Demographics ==
Devonport covers 1.89 km^{2} (0.73 sq mi) and had an estimated population of 5,090 as of June 2025, with a population density of 2,693 people per km^{2}.

Historical population
Year	Pop.	±% p.a.
2006	5,499	—
2013	5,487	−0.03%
2018	5,358	−0.47%
2023	5,079	−1.06%

Devonport had a population of 5,079 in the 2023 New Zealand census, a decrease of 279 people (−5.2%) since the 2018 census, and a decrease of 408 people (−7.4%) since the 2013 census. There were 2,421 males, 2,634 females and 21 people of other genders in 2,097 dwellings. 3.2% of people identified as LGBTIQ+. The median age was 49.3 years (compared with 38.1 years nationally). There were 771 people (15.2%) aged under 15 years, 807 (15.9%) aged 15 to 29, 2,313 (45.5%) aged 30 to 64, and 1,185 (23.3%) aged 65 or older.

People could identify as more than one ethnicity. The results were 92.3% European (Pākehā); 6.4% Māori; 2.7% Pasifika; 4.5% Asian; 2.1% Middle Eastern, Latin American and African New Zealanders (MELAA); and 2.8% other, which includes people giving their ethnicity as "New Zealander". English was spoken by 98.2%, Māori language by 1.2%, Samoan by 0.4%, and other languages by 16.3%. No language could be spoken by 0.9% (e.g. too young to talk). New Zealand Sign Language was known by 0.2%. The percentage of people born overseas was 36.4, compared with 28.8% nationally.

Religious affiliations were 26.9% Christian, 0.5% Hindu, 0.1% Islam, 0.2% Māori religious beliefs, 0.6% Buddhist, 0.4% New Age, 0.3% Jewish, and 1.1% other religions. People who answered that they had no religion were 63.1%, and 6.9% of people did not answer the census question.

Of those at least 15 years old, 2,184 (50.7%) people had a bachelor's or higher degree, 1,599 (37.1%) had a post-high school certificate or diploma, and 528 (12.3%) people exclusively held high school qualifications. The median income was $55,300, compared with $41,500 nationally. 1,236 people (28.7%) earned over $100,000 compared to 12.1% nationally. The employment status of those at least 15 was that 2,028 (47.1%) people were employed full-time, 738 (17.1%) were part-time, and 90 (2.1%) were unemployed.

Individual statistical areas
Name	Area (km^{2})	Population	Density (per km^{2})	Dwellings	Median age	Median income
Devonport	1.08	3,180	2,944	1,290	49.0 years	$55,600
Cheltenham	0.82	1,899	2,316	804	49.8 years	$55,000
New Zealand					38.1 years	$41,500

== Local government ==
The first form of local government in Devonport was the Flagstaff Highway District in 1866, which renamed to Devonport in 1869. In 1886, the road district split from Waitemata County, forming the Devonport Borough Council. In 1989, the borough was merged into the North Shore City, and in 2010 incorporated into the single unitary council, run by Auckland Council.

Within the Auckland Council, Devonport is a part of the Devonport-Takapuna local government area governed by the Devonport-Takapuna Local Board. It is a part of the North Shore ward, which elects two councillors to the Auckland Council.

=== Mayors during Devonport Borough Council ===
During its existence from 1886 to 1989, Devonport Borough had 19 mayors. The following is a complete list:

	Name	Portrait	Term of office
1	Malcolm Niccol		1886–1890
2	Ewen Alison		1890–1895
(1)	Malcolm Niccol		1895–1896
3	Joseph Macky		1896–1901
(1)	Malcolm Niccol		1901–1902
(2)	Ewen Alison		1902–1907
4	William Handley		1907–1915
5	Alick Pickford		1915–1916
6	John Henderson		1916–1919
7	Horace King		1919–1923
8	Thomas Lamont		1923–1927
9	Ernest Aldridge		1927–1930
10	John Hislop		1930–1931
11	Hugh Ferry-Wheir Meikle		1931–1941
12	Robert Gordon May		1941–1944
13	John Raymond Miller		1944–1950
14	Clem Woodall		1950–1959
15	Fred Stevens		1959–1965
16	Jack Seelye		1965–1968
17	Ted Jackson		1968–1973
18	Pat Sheehan		1973–1980
19	Jim Titchener		1980–1989

== Features ==
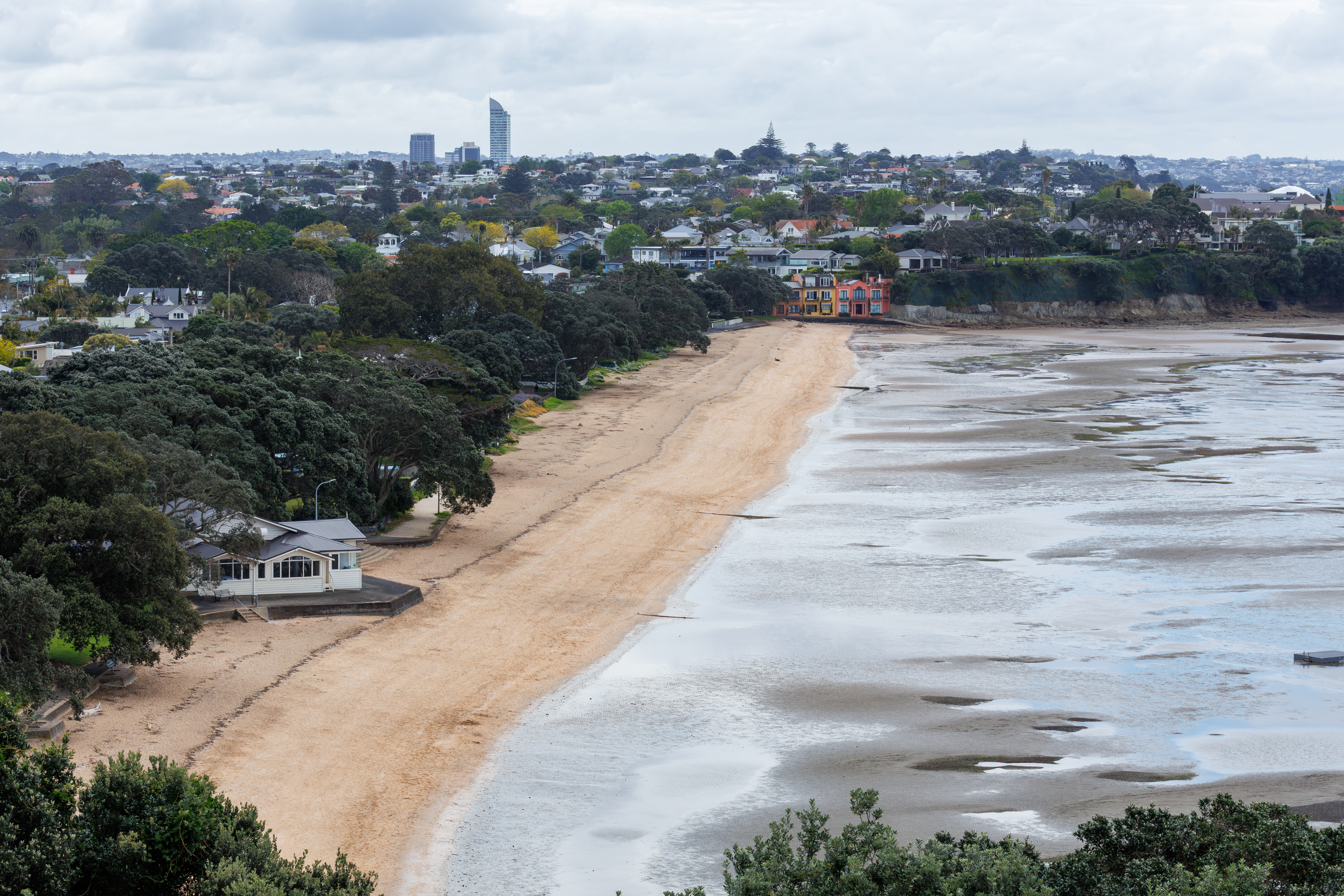
Cheltenham Beach from North Head

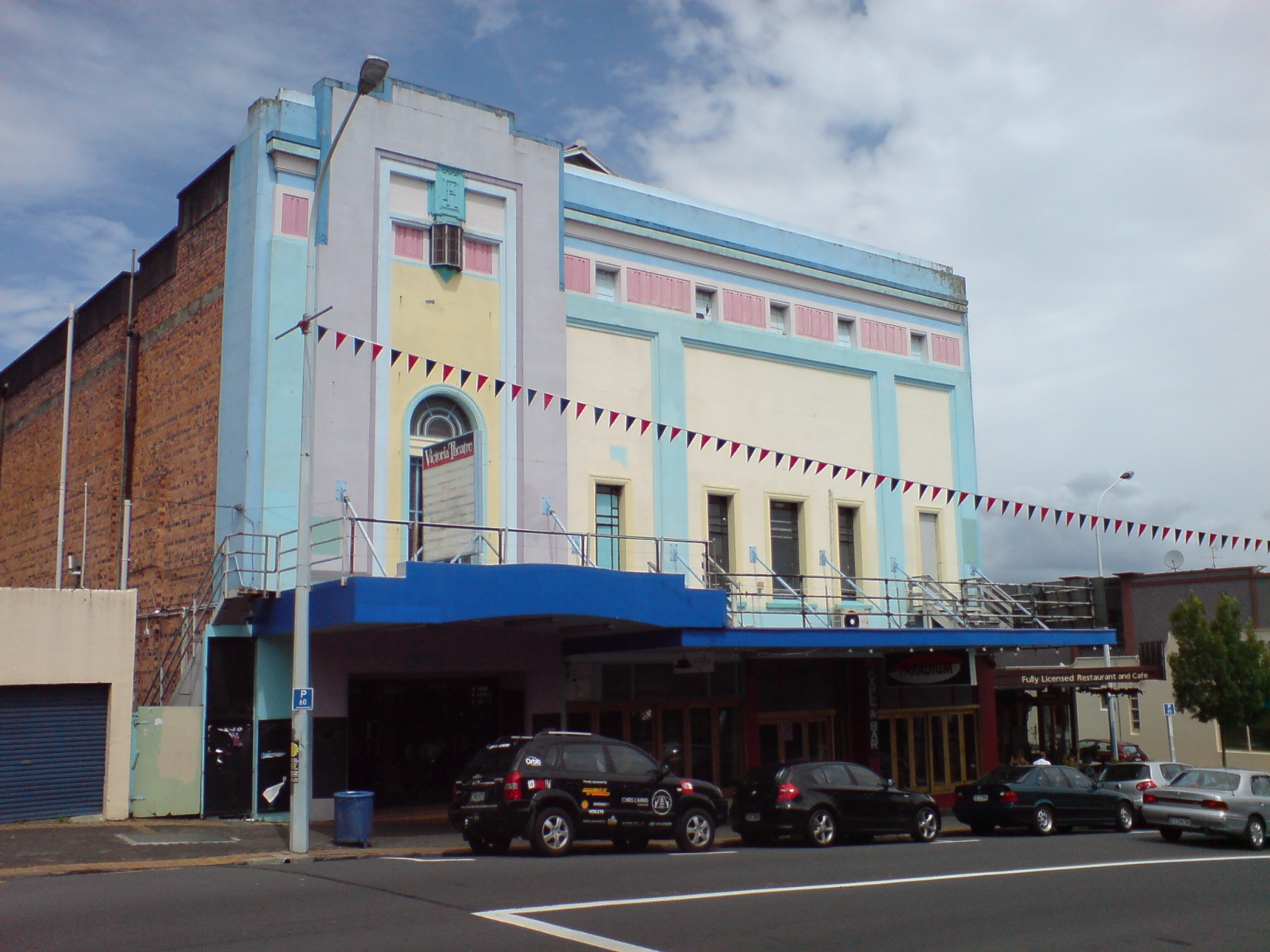
The Vic Theatre, 2008

The Esplanade Hotel

Between the wharf and Mount Victoria are the Devonport shops and several landmarks:

- The Esplanade Hotel – this is an elegant example of an 1890s seaside hotel, reminiscent of many an English seaside resort of the period. A modern extension was added on in the 1950s which has now been replaced by an apartment complex. The Edwardian building was sold for $7 million in 2015.
- Windsor Reserve – located just to the east of the Devonport Wharf; it is an area of open lawn, notable for the partially underground toilet block designed in 1989 by Jeremy Salmond, and the Edwardian archway at the northern end.
- King Edward Parade Reserve – to the north of the Windsor Reserve on the other side of the road is the King Edward Parade Reserve; here are located the Public Library, the War Memorial (a bronze soldier figure by Richard Gross) and under the Moreton Bay fig trees a 1950s styled bandstand.
- The former Post Office – an Art Deco building from the 1930s.
- The Left Bank – a 1920s neoclassical building now housing a cafe/bar/restaurant.
- The Victoria Theatre – built in 1912 and remodelled internally and externally in the 1930s in the then fashionable Art Deco style; this is apparently the oldest cinema in the Southern Hemisphere in continuous use. The cinema was purchased for $1.55 million in 2006 by the North Shore City Council on behalf of the city.
- Devonport Museum, a museum on local history, opened in 1977. Torpedo Bay Navy Museum, a military and maritime museum, opened to the public in 2010.

The Cheltenham area also includes several landmarks:

- Cheltenham Beach, sandy public beach
- Goldwater house, 26 Cheltenham Road, 1907, late villa-style family home owned by the Goldwater family until the mid-1980s.
- Morrison house, 5 Jubilee Avenue, 1896, Two-storey Italianate-villa, owned by the Morrison family 1907–1967.
- Watson houses, 15-17 Jubilee Avenue, 1899 and 1901, two villas, built and owned by the Watson family until 1917.

== Devonport Wharf ==
Today, ferry services to Devonport Wharf are more numerous again, and are subsidised by Auckland Transport. A crossing between the Auckland CBD and Devonport takes approximately 12 minutes, usually on the 'Seabus Kea', a newer double-ended ferry.

The Devonport Wharf / Ferry Terminal received a variety of maintenance and repairs during 2011 in advance of the Rugby World Cup. Further structural works were carried out in 2012.

In 2015, a $24 million redevelopment project to upgrade parts of Devonport, including the wharf, began. The renovation of the Devonport Wharf is all but complete, with applications for retail services currently underway. The project includes an improved car park and an overall modernisation of the building itself, as well as structural improvements and refurbishments.

=== Victoria Wharf ===
The 1929 wharf underwent significant repair in the 2010s and is now home to the sculpture Flight Support for Albatross by Greer Twiss.

== Local media ==
The Flea 88.2 FM and 107.1FM is a community radio station in Auckland, New Zealand. The station founder, Mike Baker, died on 4 April 2009, at the age of 71.

== Education ==
Devonport Primary School is a contributing primary (years 1–6) school with a roll of 234 located on the side of Mount Victoria with the address of 18 Kerr Street. The school was established in 1870 on a plot of land given to them by the Trevarthen family for the purposes of a chapel, before it was later renegotiated to be used as a school.

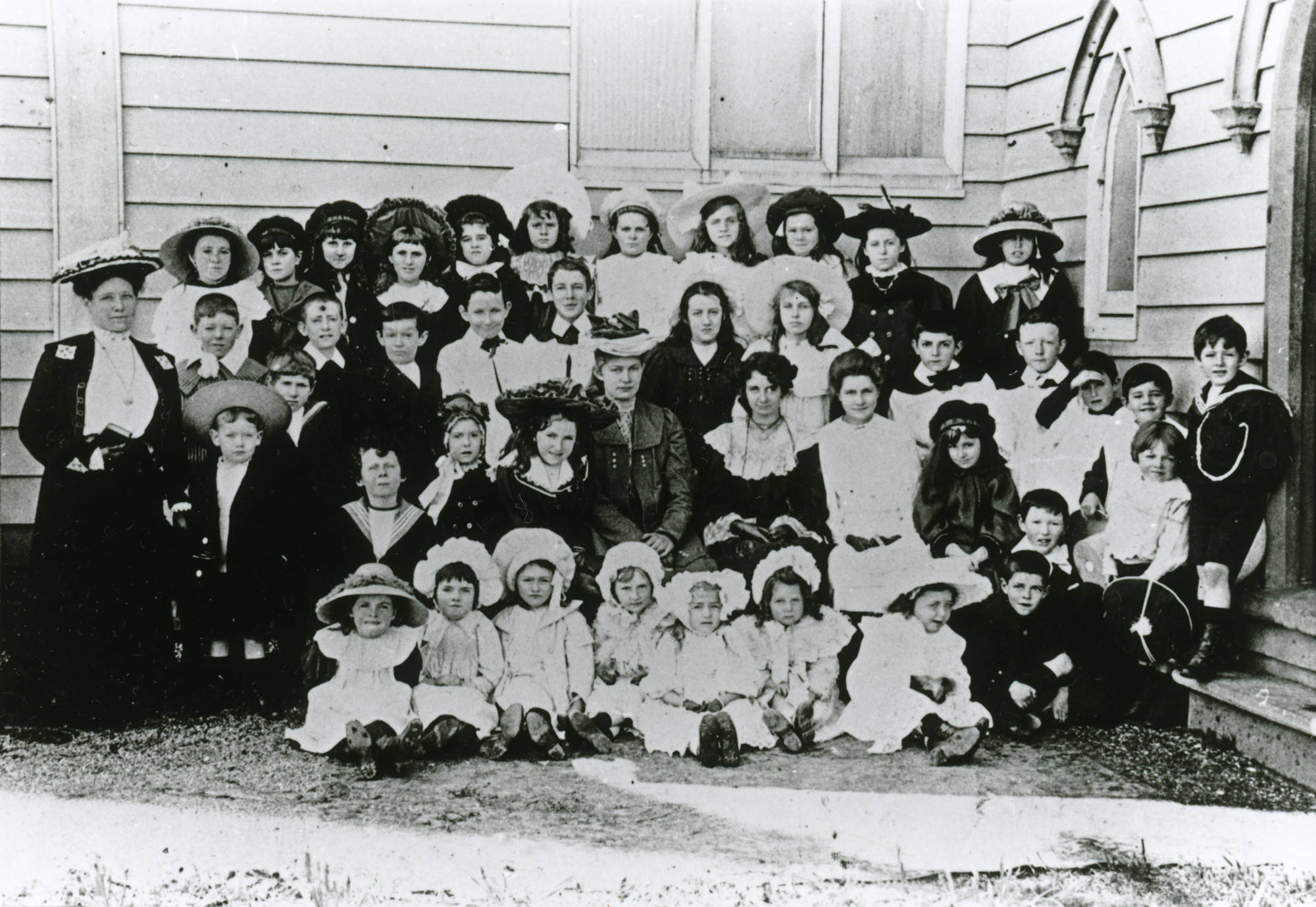
Class at St Leo's Primary School c1900

St Leo's School is a state-integrated Catholic primary (years 1–6) school with a roll of 55. It was founded in 1893.

Both these schools are co-educational. Rolls are as of July 2026.

== Religion ==
Places of worship in Devonport include:

- St Francis de Sales and All Souls Roman Catholic church
- Holy Trinity Anglican church
- Connect Interdenominational church
- Devonport Methodist church
- Naval Memorial Chapel of St Christopher's

== Sport ==
=== North Shore United AFC ===
North Shore United are an association football club that play their football at Allen Hill Stadium, located near the southern end of Lake Road. The club, founded in 1887, currently play in the NRFL Division 1, a league in the third tier of New Zealand Football. The club is the oldest in both New Zealand and Oceania, winning the Chatham Cup 6 times and the New Zealand Club Championship twice.

=== North Shore RFC ===
North Shore Rugby Football Club is a Rugby Union club located in Devonport that play their games at Devonport Domain. Founded in 1873, it is one of the oldest clubs in New Zealand.

== Notable people ==
- Finn Andrews and Sophia Burn – members of London-based band The Veils. Both grew up in Devonport.
- Tom Ashley – New Zealand Olympic sailer
- Sir Peter Blake – international yachtsman, born 1948, died 2001.
- Angela Cullen – New Zealander physiotherapist and field hockey player
- Tessa Duder – New Zealand author and former swimmer
- A. R. D. Fairburn – New Zealand poet, satirist, and critic
- Tim Finn – New Zealand musician (born 1952)
- Debbie Harwood – musician and singer, notable as a member of When the Cat's Away.
- Eliza McCartney – NZ women's pole vault champion and women's pole vault World Junior Record holder. 2016 Olympics Pole Vault Bronze medal winner. Born 1996.
- Isabel Peacocke – teacher, novelist, broadcaster, born in Devonport in 1881.
- Sir Dove-Myer Robinson – former Auckland Mayor born 1901, died 1989.
- Mary Taylor – artist, born 1948.
- Gin Wigmore – singer-songwriter, born 1986.

== See also ==
- William C Daldy, a historical steam tug currently berthed in Devonport
