= The Loons (venue) =

Events venue in New Zealand

Coordinates: 43°36′10″S 172°43′14″E

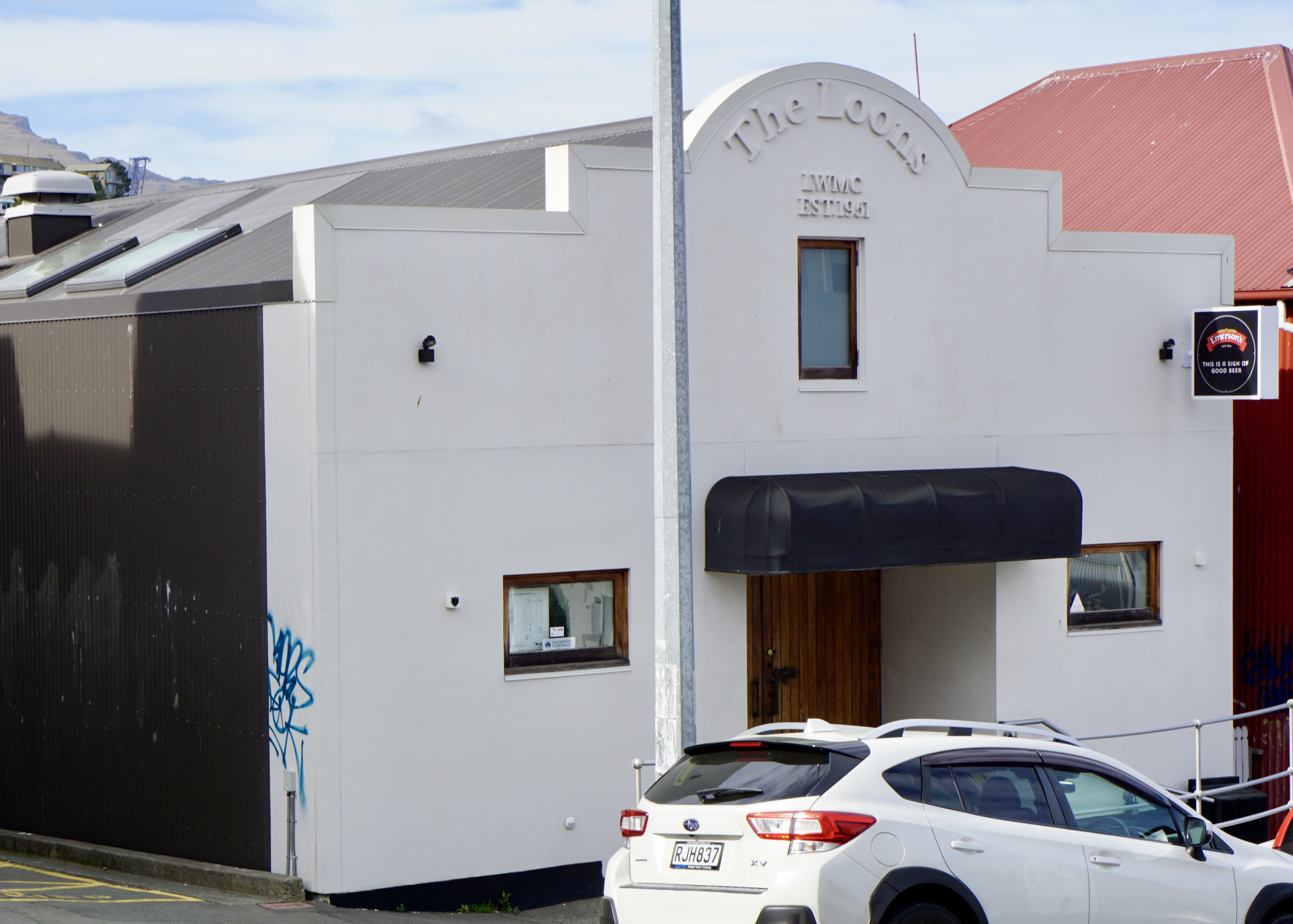
- The Loons in 2025
- Interactive map of The Loons
- Address: 16 Canterbury Street, Lyttelton; Christchurch; New Zealand
- Capacity: 450

Construction
- Renovated: 2012-2020

Website
- theloons.org.nz

The Loons is a music and performance events venue in Lyttelton, Christchurch, in the South Island of New Zealand.

The building was constructed at 16 Canterbury Street, Lyttelton in 1905. Businesses that occupied the building from 1905 to the 1920s included a grocery shop, a bakery and a tailor. During the 1920s and 1930s a motor vehicle garage operated in the building. The building was offered for sale by tender in May 1935. A transport business, the Lyttelton Carrying Service, operated from the site from 1935 through until 1942.

In 1944, the building became the Lyttelton Waterside Workers Social Club, known as "The Loons", after it was purchased by three watersiders. In 1949, the Waterside Workers Social Club applied to the Licensing Control Commission for a club charter for the site. In 1952, the name of the social club was changed to Lyttelton Working Men's Club (Inc).

In 2006, the Lyttelton Working Men's Club was facing the prospect of closing the Loons building, but a Lyttelton theatre director Mike Friend took over the lease. The Loons opened as a performance venue on 31 March 2007 with a cabaret with Joe Bennett. The theatre group took on the name of the building to become The Loons Theatre Company, using the venue as a rehearsal space during the day, and providing waiter service at night. Over 400 events were staged at the venue over a period of 5 years, ranging from community quiz nights and charity fund-raisers to children’s shows and professional theatre.

At the time of the theatre company taking up the lease, the Working Men's Club had been struggling. However, there was a resurgence in club membership after the Loons theatre company productions began. The theatre company held the liquor licence for the premises, and hosted the bar service for club members on the days when there were no performances. Parts of the building were re-purposed to support circus and theatre productions. A hatch was created between a 25 m rifle range in the basement and the theatre stage for use in performances. In addition to adult theatre performances, the venue was also used for teaching circus and theatre skills for children aged 5 to 14.

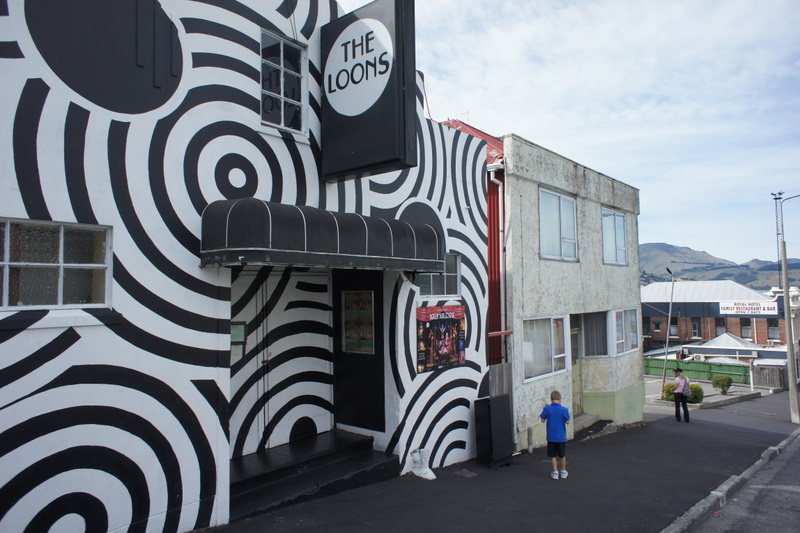
The Loons in 2010

The 2010 and 2011 Christchurch earthquakes caused damage to the building leading to closure, and the theatre company was without a home. The Lyttelton Working Men's Club undertook planning for repairs of the building with input from the theatre company. However, the theatre company was unable to reach agreement with the Working Men's Club over the terms for a new lease. The theatre company entered into an arrangement with the Lyttelton Primary School and the Ministry of Education to share in the development of a dual purpose hall and performance theatre facility on school property on the corner of Oxford Street and Sumner Road. This new venue, opened in 2016, is known as the Lyttelton Arts Factory.

The post-earthquake repairs and renovations of The Loons cost over $3m, funded from insurance and money raised through grants. During the period of the renovations, the Lyttelton Working Men's Club changed its name to The Loons Club (Inc), a registered charity. The renovations were completed in December 2020, and The Loons re-opened in 2021 as a venue for live music and performance events, with capacity for up to 450 people.

The Loons has hosted performances from a wide variety of artists including New Zealand bands such as Tiny Ruins. New Zealand folk singer Mel Parsons has described the venue:

I would say Loons is the main Christchurch venue now. It's almost like a community hall. It's beautiful, and has been refurbished, but it's just a big long room with a wooden floor and a stage at one end.
