= Joe Bennett (writer) =

Writer from New Zealand

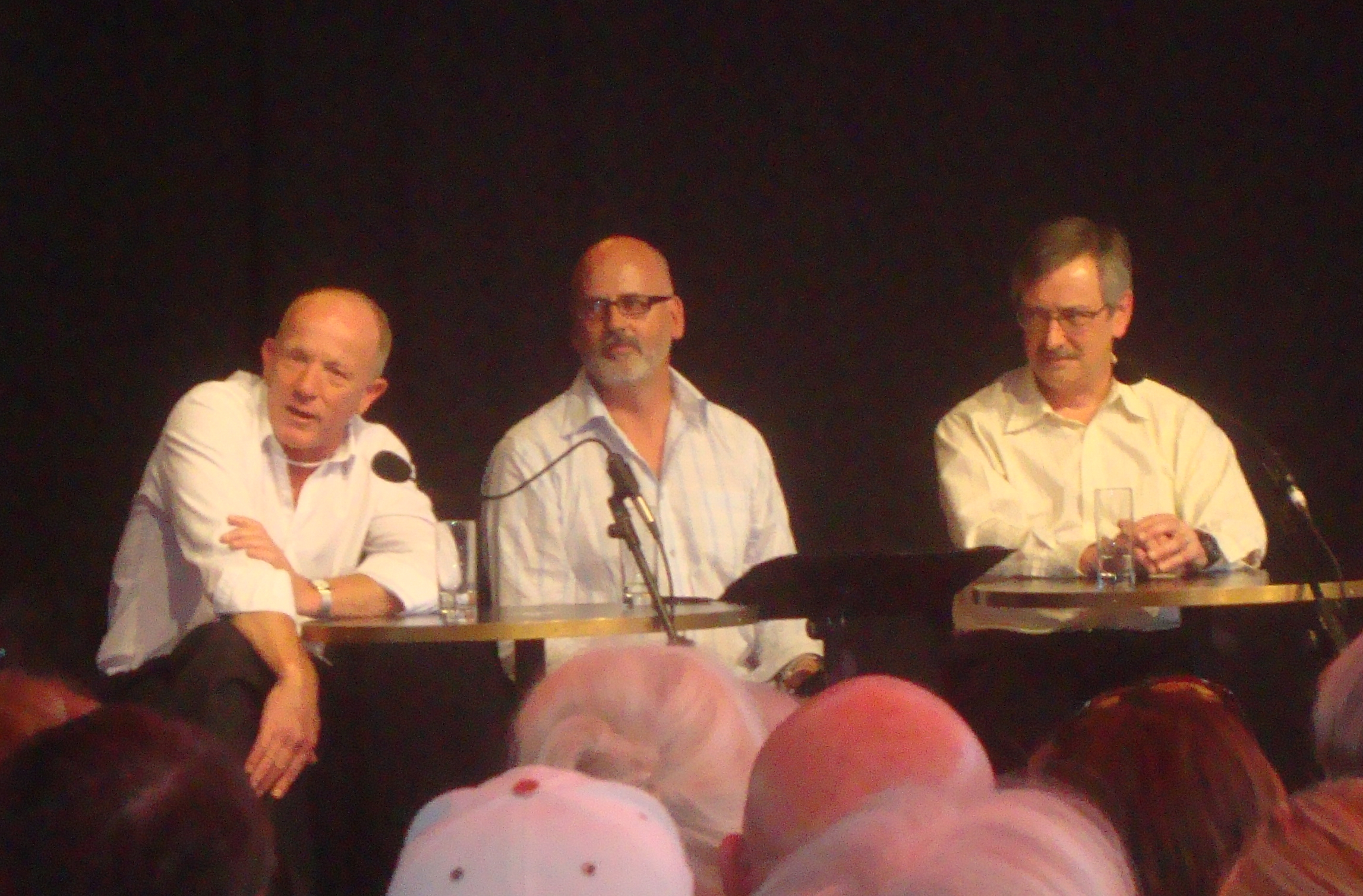
Joe Bennett (left), Andrew Holden (editor of The Press) and Rod Oram

Julian "Joe" Bennett (born 20 April 1957) is an English-born writer, columnist and playwright living in Lyttelton, New Zealand. He is the author of more than 20 books, and writes for Christchurch newspaper The Press in columns syndicated throughout New Zealand.

"He’s the People’s Columnist, a great prose stylist, funny and original, a scholar and a humanist, firmly on the side of common sense ... He reveres Waugh but his model is closer to Orwell, that master of direct speech." Steve Braunias.

== Personal life ==
Born in Eastbourne, England, Joe Bennett was the youngest of four. In his memoir he describes a difficult relationship with his father, who died when he was 16. As a child he imagined becoming a professional cricketer. After studying at Cambridge, he taught at schools in Spain, France, England, Canada, and New Zealand. Bennett emigrated to New Zealand when he was 29, in 1987. Before taking up freelance writing in 1998, he worked as an English teacher at Christ's College in Christchurch.

Bennett's first memoir, From There to Here (2023), is an account of his childhood and youth in England. It recounts his growing awareness that he was gay.

"[Bennett] writes about his love life. He writes about his sexuality. More so, he writes about beauty – male beauty, first felt at 14, when he sees “a youth” in purple hipsters walk down the street. "My ideal form was male, not female. And I think I had always known it.”

== Career ==
In 1994 Bennett wrote the words to the musical Tramps, a co-production between Christ's College and St Margaret's College, reviewed in The Press.

Where Underpants Come From: From Checkout to Cotton Field – Travels Through the New China (2008) traces a pair of cheap underpants from New Zealand to China.

King Rich (2015) is a novel set in Christchurch after the February 2011 earthquake.

In the book Fun Run and Other Oxymorons (2000), his second collection of columns, Bennett writes:

"If anything holds these articles together it is that I like people but not in herds. I distrust all beliefs, most thought and anything ending in ism. Most opinion is emotion in fancy dress."

Bennett is fond of dogs and this is reflected in the titles and cover art of many of his books.

He featured in the New Zealand comedy show Moon TV hosted by "That Guy" Leigh Hart in a segment called "Bookzone: A Show About Books".

In December 2011 he appeared in the media for refusing to evacuate his Lyttelton home as ordered by the Christchurch City Council due to fears of falling rocks if another earthquake was to occur.

== Awards ==
At the Canon Media Awards 2011, Bennett won New Zealand Columnist of the Year for the fifth time.

== Selected bibliography ==
- Just Walking the Dogs (1998) ISBN 1-877161-49-7
- Sleeping Dogs and Other Lies (1999) ISBN 1-877161-67-5
- Fun Run and Other Oxymorons (2000) ISBN 0-684-86136-4 (A collection of his first two books).
- So Help Me Dog (2000) ISBN 1-877270-02-4
- Sit (2001) ISBN 1-877270-10-5
- Doggone (2002) ISBN 1-877270-34-2
- Bedside Lovers (and Other Goats) (2002) ISBN 0743228650
- Barking (2003) ISBN 1-877270-49-0
- Unmuzzled (2004) ISBN 1-877270-85-7
- A Land of Two Halves (2004) ISBN 0-7432-5713-8 ISBN 074326357X
- Dogmatic (2005) ISBN 1-877393-11-8
- Down Boy (2006) ISBN 1-877393-25-8
- Mustn't Grumble: An Accidental Return To England (2006) ISBN 0-7432-7627-2
- Love, Death, Washing-up, Etc: Joe Bennett Sorts It Out (2007) ISBN 1847391087
- Eyes Right (and They's Wrong) (2007) ISBN 0731813502
- Where Underpants Come From: Travels in the new China (2008) ISBN 1-84737-001-2 ISBN 978-1847370013
- Laugh? I Could Have Cried (2008) ISBN 9781869507459
- Alive And Kicking (2008) ISBN 1869506723
- The World's Your Lobster (2009) ISBN 978-1-86950-810-4
- Hello Dubai (2010) ISBN 978-1-84737-674-9
- Celebrity Cat Recipes (2010) ISBN 9781869508111
- Double Happiness: How bullshit works (2012) ISBN 978-1-86950-957-6
- Fish like a Drink (2013) ISBN 978-1-77549-053-1
- King Rich (2015) ISBN 9781775490920
- From There to Here (2023) ISBN 978-1-7755-4056-4 (a memoir)
- A Land of Two Halves (revised: 2024) ISBN 9781775542674
