= Chapman Tripp Theatre Awards =

Annual theatre awards in Wellington, New Zealand (1992–2014)

- Type: Wellington, New Zealand theatre awards
- Established: 1992

The Chapman Tripp Theatre Awards were the main theatre awards in New Zealand's capital city, Wellington, from 1992–2014, and have been succeeded by the Wellington Theatre Awards.

Established in 1992 and sponsored by law firm Chapman Tripp, the prestigious awards were a highlight in Wellington's art and social calendar. The presentations also recognised important contributions to the arts and the community. The winners were selected by a panel of Wellington theatre critics. In 2014 Chapman Tripp ended their 22 year sponsorship due to a shift in their corporate social responsibility programme.

The main theatres in Wellington such as BATS Theatre, Circa Theatre, and Downstage Theatre each had an individual Production of the Year award for their best production during the year.

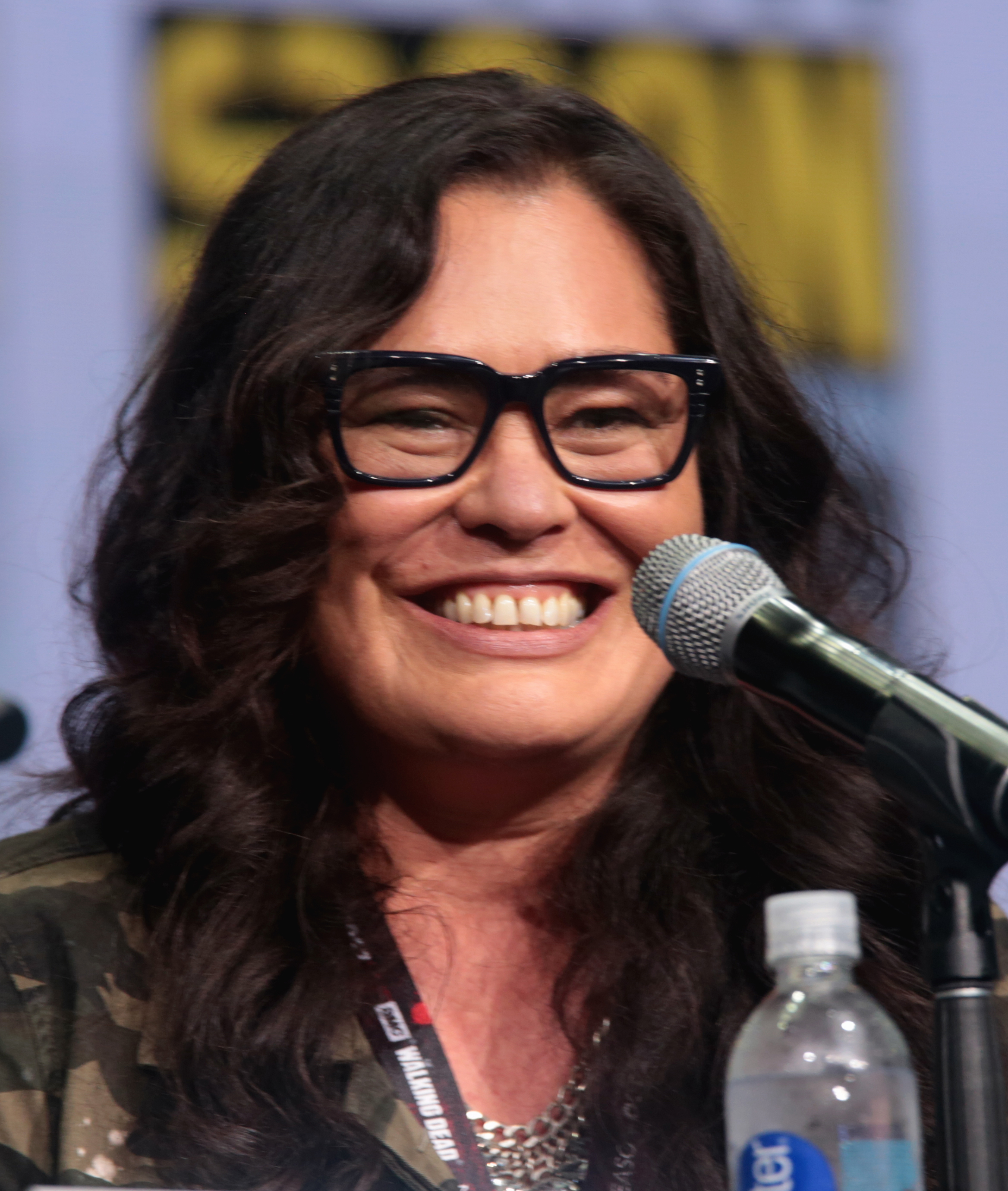
Rachel House, who won four Chapman Tripps for Most Promising Female Newcomer (1995), Outstanding Performance (2000), Best Director (2001) and Best Female Actor in a Supporting Role (2003)

== Notable winners ==
Winners at the Chapman Tripp Theatre Awards include the most acclaimed names in New Zealand theatre. Such names include directors such as multiple winner Colin McColl (Laureate Award, Arts Foundation of New Zealand 2007), Miranda Harcourt, Susan Wilson, Nathaniel Lees, Cathy Downes, Ross Jolly and Rachel Teaomarama House.

Best Actress winners include Jennifer Ludlam, Katherine McRae, Carmel McGlone, Grace Hoet and Madeleine Sami.

Best Actor winners include Ray Henwood, Tim Balme, Grant Tilly, Dave Fane and Peter Hambleton. In 2006, acclaimed Maori actor George Henare (NZ Laureate Award, Arts Foundation of New Zealand 2008) received a Chapman Tripp Best Actor Award for his portrayal of Willy Loman in Circa Theatre's Death of a Salesman.

Playwrights include David Geary, Briar Grace-Smith, Hone Kouka, Hori Ahipene and Kirk Torrance.

== 1992 awards ==
Award	Winner
Bats Production of the Year	A Dangerous Game
Circa Production of the Year	Joyful and Triumphant
Costume designer of the Year	Prunella Wilde in The Glass Menagerie
Director of the Year	Susan Wilson in Joyful and Triumphant
Downstage Production of the Year	Death and the Maiden
Female Actor of the Year	Jennifer Ludlam for Lysistrata and Daughters of Heaven, both at Downstage
Female Actor in a Supporting Role	Diedre O'Connor for a triple role in The Comedy of Errors at Circa
Lighting Designer of the Year	Tony Rabbit in Death and the Maiden at Downstage
Male Actor of the Year	Brian Sergent for The Homecoming at Circa, and A Dangerous Game at Bats Theatre
Male Actor in a Supporting Role	Andrew Laing in The Glass Menagerie at Circa
Most Original Production	Hide 'n' Seek by Hori Ahipene and Hone Kouka at Taki Rua-Depot
Most Promising Female Newcomer	Nancy Brunning for Nga Wahine at Taki Rua-Depot
Most Promising Male Newcomer	Tim Spite for Backstage with the Quigleys at Bats, and Blue Remembered Hills at Circa
NZ Playwright of the Year	Robert Lord for Joyful and Triumphant
Production of the Year	Joyful and Triumphant at Circa Theatre
Set Designer of the Year	Prunella Wilde in The Glass Menagerie at Circa Theatre
Significant Contribution to Theatre	George Webby (Director of NZ Drama School for 14 years, chairman of the Downstage Theatre Trust)
Taki Rua-Depot Production of the Year	Hide 'n' Seek

== 1993 awards ==
Award	Winner
Bats Production of the Year	Verbatim
Circa Production of the Year	A Doll's House
Costume Designer of the Year	Kate Hawley
Downstage Production of the Year	Glengarry Glen Ross
Lighting Designer of the Year	Paul O'Brien
Most Original Production of the Year	Ophelia Thinks Harder director Jean Betts
Most Promising Female Newcomer of the Year	Lara Matheson
Most Promising Male Newcomer of the Year	Andrew Scott
New New Zealand Play of the Year	Farewell Speech by Cathy Downes, adapted from Rachel McAlpine
Set Designer of the Year	Prunella Wilde
Taki Rua Production of the Year	Cracks

== 1994 awards ==
Award	Winner
Bats Production of the Year	City of Hands
Circa Production of the Year	Angels in America
Costume Designer of the Year	Dorita Hannah, for Nga Tangata Toa (Taki Rua)
Director of the Year	Susan Wilson, for Angels in America
Downstage Production of the Year	Lovelock's Dream Run
Female Actor of the Year	Denise O'Connell in The Sisters Rosensweig (Circa)
Female Actor in a Supporting Role	Adele Chapman in Nora
Lighting Designer of the Year	Phil Blackburn, for Angels in America (Circa)
Male Actor of the Year	Grant Tilly, in Angels in America
Male Actor in a Supporting Role	Brian Sergent in I Hate Hamlet (Circa)
Most Original Production of the Year	City of Hands, director Stephen Bain (Bats)
Most Promising Female Newcomer	Hera Dunleavy in Beautiful Thing (Circa)
Most Promising Male Newcomer	Bradley Carroll, in Lovelock's Dream Run
New New Zealand Play of the Year	Nga Tangata Toa by Hone Kouka (Taki Rua)
Production of the Year	Angels in America (Circa)
Set Designer of the Year	Andrew Moyes for Angels in America (Circa)
Significant Contribution to Theatre	Circa Theatre Council
Taki Rua Production of the Year	Nga Tangata Toa

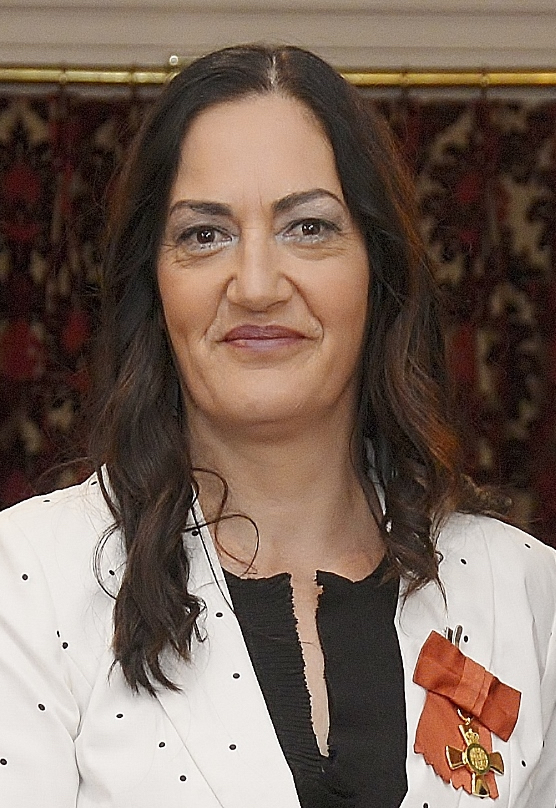
Briar Grace-Smith's play Nga Pou Wahine won the Best Short Play Award in 1995

== 1995 awards ==
Award	Winner
Bats Production of the Year	The Iron Mistress
Best Short Play of the Year	Nga Pou Wahine by Briar Grace Smith
Circa Production of the Year	Arcadia
Costume Designer of the Year	Donna Jefferis
Director of the Year	Nathaniel Lees for Think of a Garden
Downstage Production of the Year	Takitoru
Female Actor of the Year	Katherine McRae
Female Actor in a Supporting Role	Sima Urale
Lighting Designer of the Year	Phil Blackburn
Male Actor of the Year	Stephen Lovatt
Male Actor in a Supporting Role	Stephen Gledhill
Most Original Production of the Year	Takitoru, directed by Jan Bolwell, Keri Kaa, Sunny Amey
Most Promising Female Newcomer of the Year	Rachel House
Most Promising Male Newcomer of the Year	Simon Ferry
New New Zealand Play of the Year	Saving Grace by Duncan Sarkies
Production of the Year	Think of a Garden, directed by Nathaniel Lees
Set Designer of the Year	One of nominated designers John Parker, Amanda Yates, Justine Clark, Dorita Hannah
Significant Contribution to Theatre	Richard Campion
Taki Rua Production of the Year	Think of a Garden

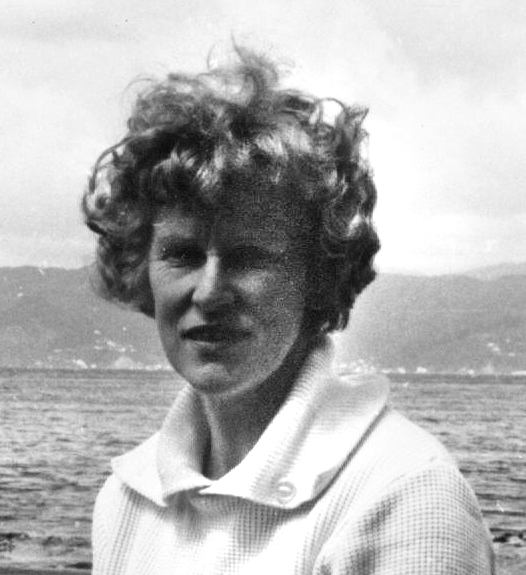
Rona Bailey was honoured for her significant contribution to theatre in 1996

== 1996 awards ==
Award	Winner
Bats Production of the Year	Black Monk
Circa Production of the Year	Three Tall Women
Costume Designer of the Year	John Verryt for King Lear
Director of the Year	Cathy Downes for Tzigane
Downstage Production of the Year	King Lear
Female Actor of the Year	Dorothy McKegg in Tzigane
Female Actor in a Supporting Role	Geraldine Brophy in Tzigane
Female Comedian or Group of the Year	Hen's Teeth Collective
Lighting Designer of the Year	Martyn Roberts for Black Monk
Male Actor of the Year	Bruce Phillips in Broken Glass
Male Actor in a Supporting Role	Roy Ward in The Visit
Male Comedian or Group of the Year	Sugar & Spice
Most Original Production of the Year	Too High The Son by Stephen Bain with France Hervé & Tim Spite
Most Promising Female Newcomer of the Year	Nicola Kawana in Mo & Jess Kill Susie
Most Promising Male Newcomer of the Year	Jason Te Kare in Flat Out Brown
Outstanding New New Zealand Play of the Year	Tzigane by John Vakidis
Outstanding Short Play of the Year	Mo & Jess Kill Susie by Gary Henderson
Production of the Year	Tzigane directed by Cathy Downes
Set Designer of the Year	Dorita Hannah for The Visit
Significant Contribution to Theatre	Rona Bailey
Taki Rua Production of the Year	Te Reo Māori season

== 1997 awards ==
Award	Winner
Actress of the Year	Michele Amas in The Herbal Bed
Actress in a Supporting Role	Perry Piercy in Taking Sides
Actor of the Year	Tim Balme in The Ballad of Jimmy Costello
Actor in a Supporting Role	Bruce Phillips in The Herbal Bed
BATS Production of the Year	Krishnan's Dairy
Circa Production of the Year	Taking Sides
Costume Designer of the Year	Debz Ruffell for Lady Windermere's Fan
Director of the Year	Roger Morton for Kvetch
Downstage Production of the Year	The Ballad of Jimmy Costello
Lighting Designer of the Year	Martyn Roberts for Mouth
Most Original Production of the Year	Bent directed by Jacqueline Coats
Most Promising Female Newcomer of the Year	Jane Gratkowski in Agamemnon and Sally Stockwell in Taking Sides
Most Promising Male Newcomer of the Year	Scott Wills in Mojo
Outstanding New New Zealand Play of the Year	Purapurawhetu by Briar Grace Smith
Outstanding Short Play of the Year	Small Man On a Blue Background by Sean Allan
Production of the Year	Krishnan's Dairy directed by Justin Lewis
Set Designer of the Year	Andrew Foster for The Lead Wait
Significant Contribution to the Theatre	Constance Kirkcaldie
Sound Designer of the Year	Chris Ward for The Lead Wait
Taki Rua Production of the Year	Purapurawhetu

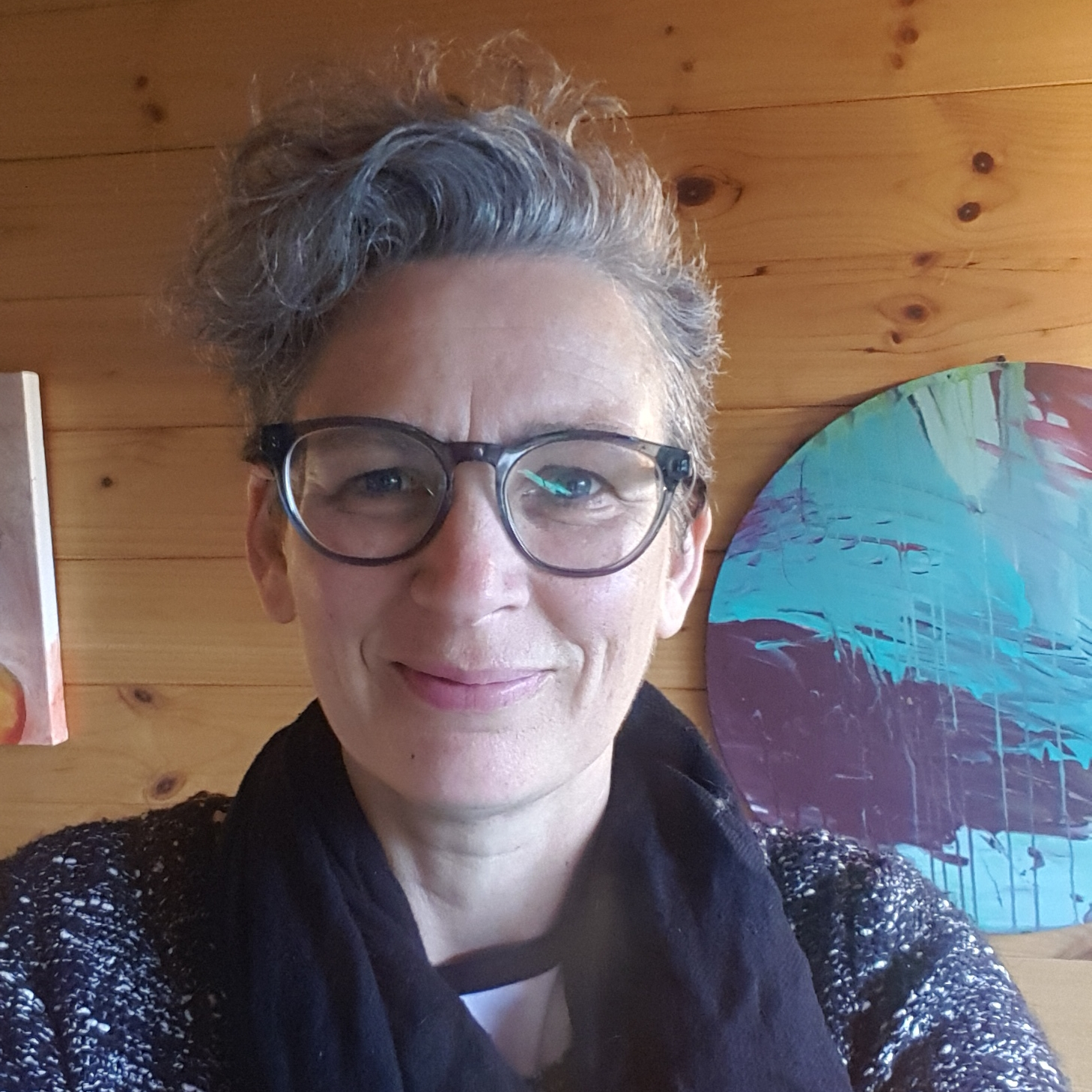
Lisa Maule won the Lighting Designer of the Year award in 1998 for her work on Home Fires.

== 1998 awards ==
Award	Winner
Actress of the Year	Alice Fraser in Amy's View
Actor of the Year	David Fane in Sons
Costume Designer	Paul Jenden for Dirty Weekends
Director of the Year	Cathy Downes for Closer
Lighting Designer	Lisa Maule for Home Fires
Most Original Production of the Year	Dirt - Bret McKenzie, Jeremy Randerson, Jackie van Beek, Gentiane Lupi, Jason Whyte
Most Promising Female Newcomer	Helen Jones in The Farm
Most Promising Male Newcomer	Robbie Magasiva in Sons
Outstanding New New Zealand Play	Sons by Victor Rodger
Outstanding New Writer	Victor Rodger, Sons
Outstanding Performance	Anna McPhail in Wolf Lullaby
Outstanding Performance	Helen Moulder in Vita and Virginia
Outstanding Performance	Jennifer Ludlam in Vita and Virginia
Production of the Year	Closer directed by Cathy Downes
Set Designer	Tony Rabbit for A Christmas Carol
Significant Contribution to Theatre	John McDavitt, former director of Playmarket
Sound Designer	Nigel Scott for An Unseasonable Fall of Snow

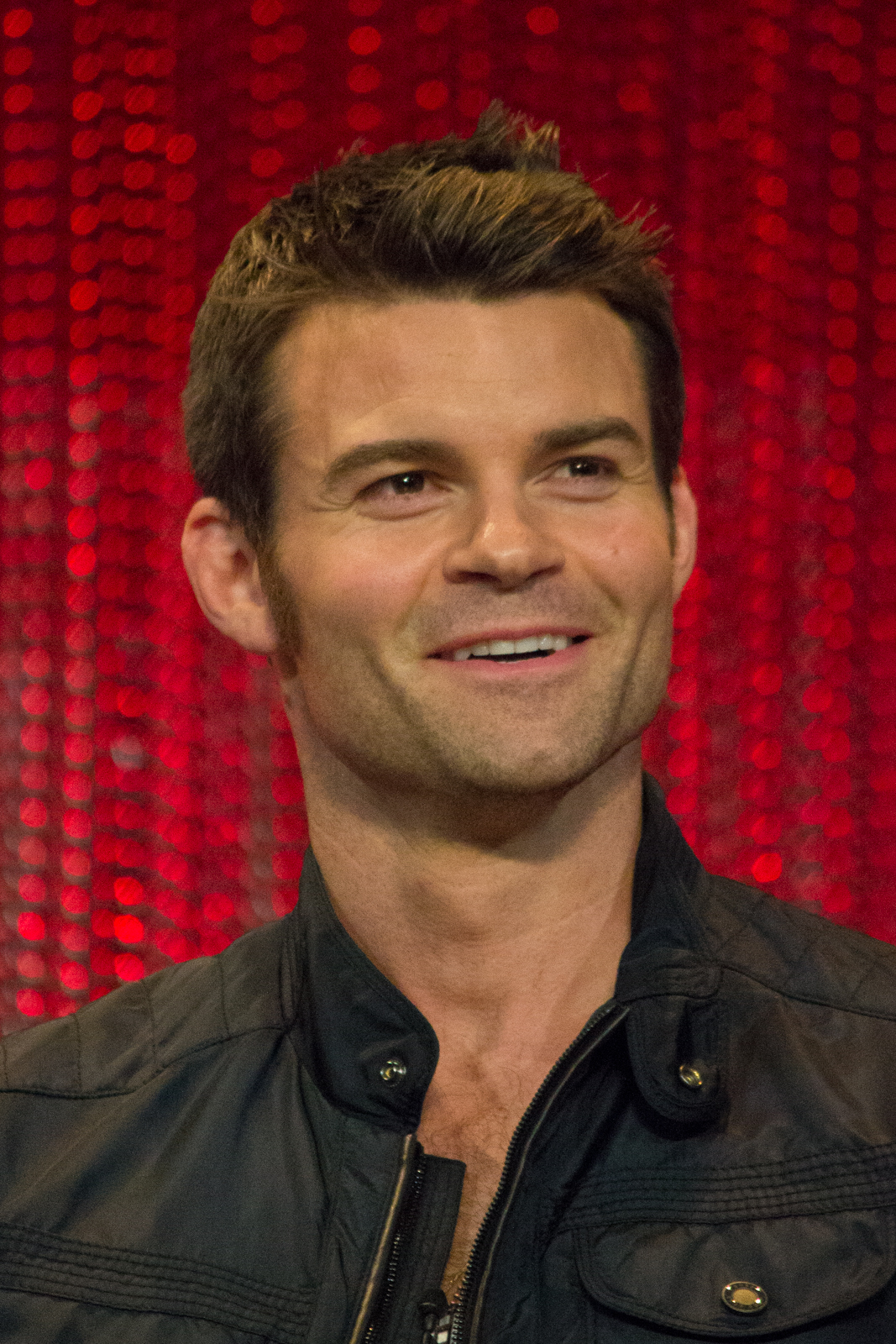
Daniel Gillie won Most Promising Male Newcomer of the Year in 1999 for his work in The God Boy

== 1999 awards ==
Award	Winner
Actress of the Year	Madeleine Sami in Bare
Actor of the Year	Ken Blackburn in Waiting for Godot
Costume Designer of the Year	Paul Jenden for A Dragon in a Wagon
Director of the Year	Ross Jolly for Waiting For Godot
Lighting Designer of the Year	Jennifer Lal for Mapaki
Most Original Production of the Year	Flood directed by Tracey Monastra & Emma Willis
Most Promising Female Newcomer of the Year	Madeleine Sami in Bare
Most Promising Male Newcomer of the Year	Daniel Gillies in The God Boy
Outstanding New New Zealand Play of the Year	Bare by Toa Fraser
Outstanding New Writer of the Year	Toa Fraser for Bare
Outstanding Performance	Jacque Drew in Danny and the Deep Blue Sea
Outstanding Performance	Tim Balme in Much Ado About Nothing
Outstanding Performance	Bruce Phillips Julius Caesar
Production of the Year	Much Ado About Nothing directed by Miranda Harcourt
Set Designer of the Year	Andrew Thomas for Much Ado About Nothing
Significant Contribution to the Theatre	Sheilah Wynn
Sound Designer of the Year	Gavin McLean for Automaton

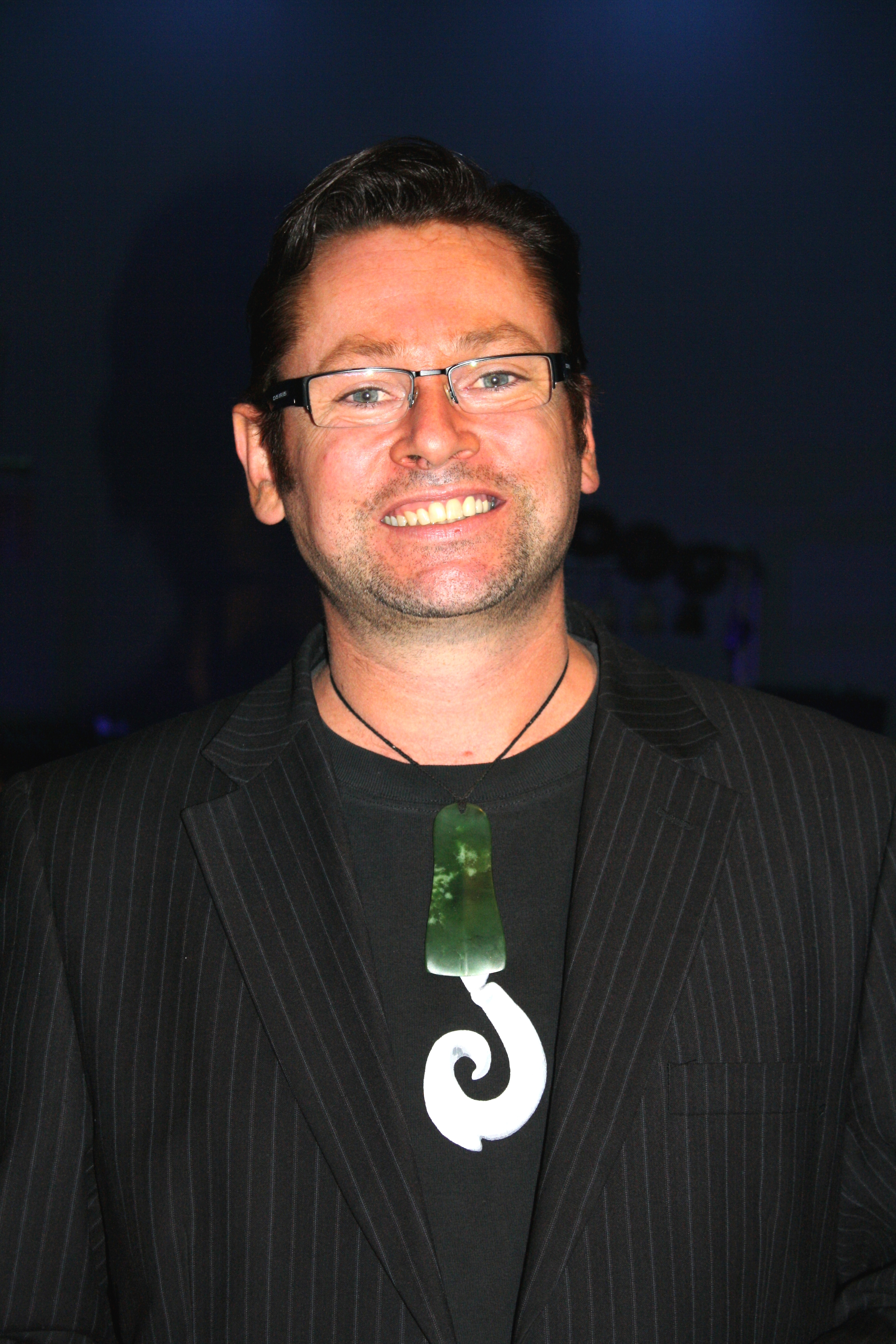
Gareth Farr won the Outstanding Composer of Original Music Award in 2000

== 2000 awards ==
Award	Winner
Actress of the Year	Helen Moulder in Wit
Actor of the Year	Tim Spite in Flipside
Costume Designer of the Year	Janet Dunn for Rosencrantz and Guildenstern Are Dead
Director of the Year	Colin McColl for Rosencrantz and Guildenstern Are Dead
Lighting Designer of the Year	Lisa Maule for Haruru Mai
Most Original Production of the Year	Seeyd
Most Promising Female Newcomer of the Year	Tandi Wright in A Midsummer Night's Dream
Most Promising Male Newcomer of the Year	John Katipa in Haruru Mai
Outstanding Composer of Original Music	Gareth Farr for Wit
Outstanding Performance	Madeleine Sami in No 2
Outstanding Performance	Rachel House in Woman Far Walking
Peter Harcourt Award for Outstanding New Writer of the Year	James Griffin for Serial Killers
Production of the Year	Flipside directed by Simon Bennett
Set Designer of the Year	Andrew Thomas for Rosencrantz and Guildenstern Are Dead
Sound Designer of the Year	Peter Edge for Flipside
Supporting Actress of the Year	Tandi Wright for Rutherford
Supporting Actor of the Year	Peter Hambleton in Rosencrantz and Guildenstern Are Dead
The Absolutely Positively Outstanding New New Zealand Play of the Year	No 2 by Toa Fraser

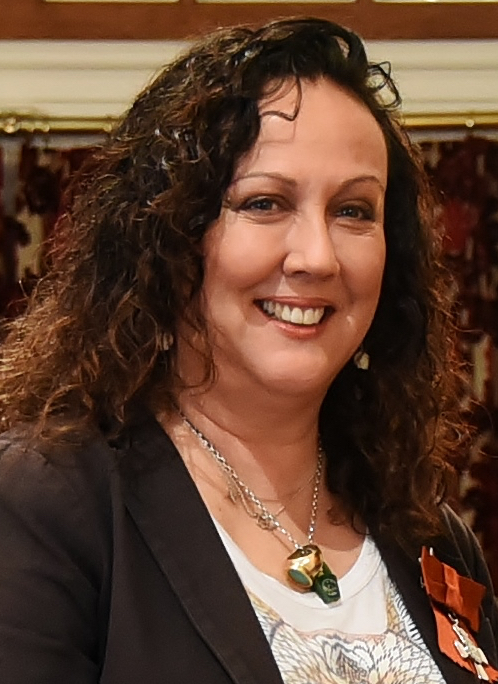
Rima Te Wiata won an Outstanding Performance Award for her role in Madame Melville in 2001

== 2001 awards ==
Award	Winner
Actress of the Year	Grace Hoet in Take Me Home Mr!
Actor of the Year	Ray Henwood in Playing Burton
Costume Designer of the Year	Allan Lees for The Jungle Book
Director of the Year	Rachel House for Have Car, Will Travel
Lighting Designer of the Year	Jennifer Lal for Have Car, Will Travel
Most Original Production of the Year	inSalt
Most Promising Female Newcomer of the Year	Nikki MacDonnell in Waterloo Sunset
Most Promising Male Newcomer of the Year	Christopher Brougham in Vick's Boy and Robert Mokaraka in Have Car, Will Travel
Outstanding Composer of Original Music	Chris O'Connor for Irish Annals of Aotearoa
Outstanding Performance	Peter Daube in The Blue Room
Outstanding Performance	Rima Te Wiata in Madame Melville
Peter Harcourt Award for Outstanding New Writer of the Year	William Walker for Take Me Home Mr!
Production of the Year	On the Razzle directed by Elric Hooper
Set Designer of the Year	SEEyd Company for inSalt
Sound Designer of the Year	Craig Sengelow for Have Car, Will Travel
Supporting Actor of the Year	Jonathon Hendry in As You Like It
Supporting Actress of the Year	Anna McPhail in On the Razzle
The Absolutely Positively Outstanding New New Zealand Play of the Year	Have Car, Will Travel by Mitch Tawhi Thomas

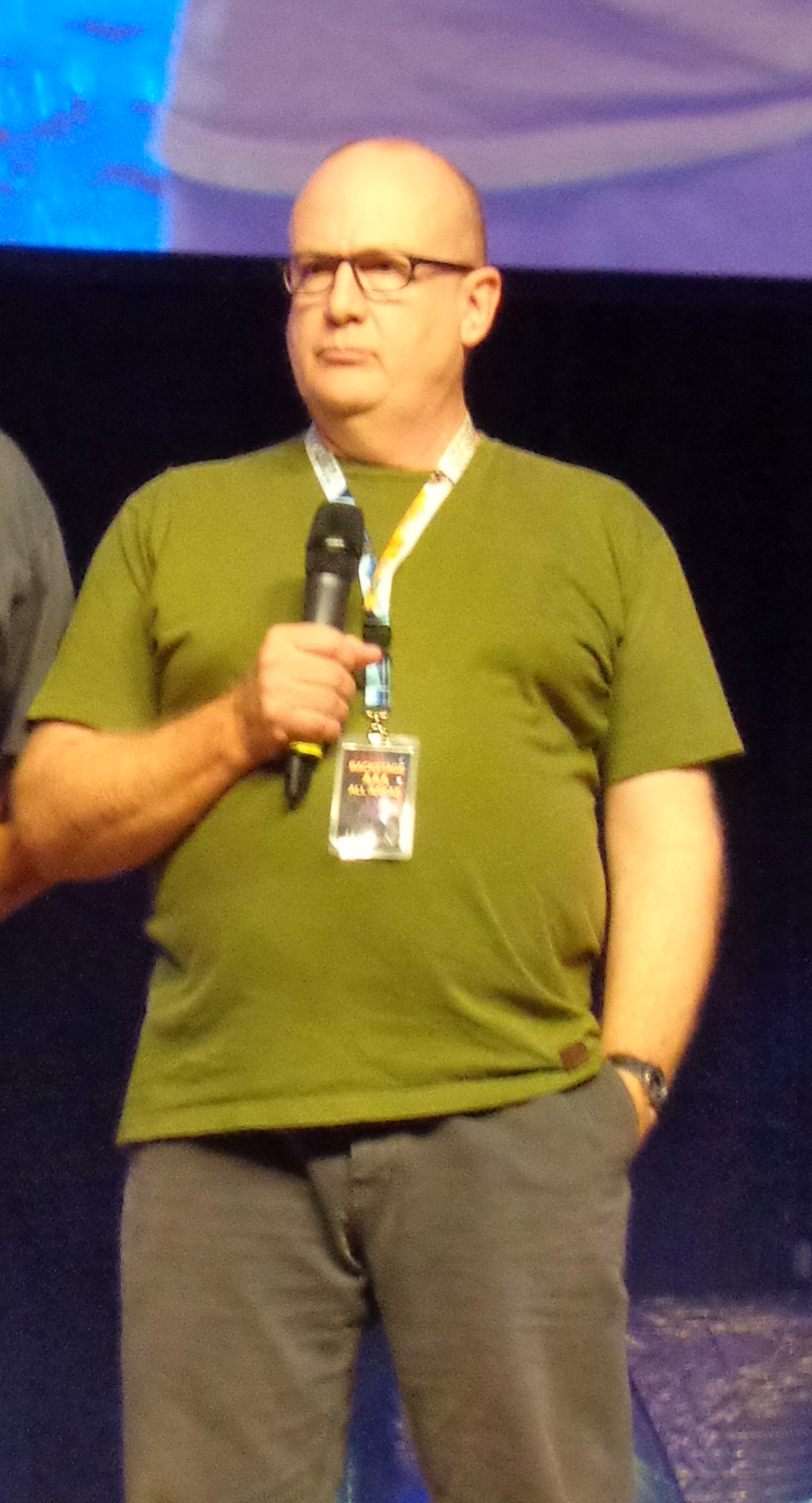
Peter Hambleton won Actor of the Year in 2002 for his role in Copenhagen

== 2002 awards ==
Award	Winner
Actress of the Year	Jennifer Ludlam in Who's Afraid of Virginia Woolf?
Actor of the Year	Peter Hambleton in Copenhagen
Costume Designer of the Year	Alice Tinning for Richard III
Director of the Year	Colin McColl for Who's Afraid of Virginia Woolf?
Lighting Designer of the Year	Martyn Roberts in Copenhagen
Most Original Production of the Year	SAnD
Most Promising Female Newcomer of the Year	Erica Lowe in Hamlet
Most Promising Male Newcomer of the Year	Ben Barrington in East
Outstanding Composer of Original Music	Don McGlashan for The World's Wife
Outstanding Performance	Grant Tilly in The Daylight Atheist
Outstanding Performance	Jacob Rajan in The Pickle King
Peter Harcourt Award for Outstanding New Playwright of the Year	Peter Cox for The Plum Tree
Production of the Year	The Pickle King
Set Designer of the Year	Ross Gibbs for Gravity
Significant Contribution to the Theatre	Red Mole
Sound Designer of the Year	Peter Edge for Gravity
Supporting Actor of the Year	Toby Leach in Trick of the Light
Supporting Actress of the Year	Donna Akersten in The Birthday Party
The Absolutely Positively Outstanding New New Zealand Play of the Year	Trick of the Light by Ken Duncum

== 2003 awards ==
Award	Winner
Actress of the Year	Helen Moulder in Meeting Karpovsky
Actor of the Year	Bruce Phillips in Cherish
Costume Designer of the Year	Ken Blackburn for The Wind in the Willows
Director of the Year	Katherine McRae for An Enemy of the People
Lighting Designer of the Year	Stephen Blackburn for Vula
Most Original Production of the Year	Strata
Most Promising Female Newcomer of the Year	Rachel More in Humble Boy
Most Promising Male Newcomer of the Year	Simon Vincent in A Passionate Woman
Most Promising New Director	Tim Spite for Strata
Outstanding Composer of Original Music	Gareth Farr for Vula
Outstanding Performance	Tim Spite in The Wind in the Willows
Outstanding Performance	Peter Hambleton in An Enemy of the People
Peter Harcourt Award for Outstanding New Playwright of the Year	Kirk Torrance for Strata
Production of the Year	An Enemy of the People
Set Designer of the Year	Nicole Cosgrove for An Enemy of the People
Significant Contribution to the Theatre	Ian Hull-Brown
Sound Designer of the Year	Sebastian Morgan-Lynch for In Flame
Supporting Actress of the Year	Rachel House for An Enemy of the People
Supporting Actor of the Year	Wi Kuki Kaa for An Enemy of the People
The Absolutely Positively Outstanding New New Zealand Play of the Year	Cherish by Ken Duncum

== 2004 awards ==
Award	Winner
Actress of the Year	Carmel McGlone in Macbeth
Actor of the Year	Paul McLaughlin in Albert Speer
Costume Designer of the Year	Gillie Coxill for Big River
Director of the Year	David O'Donnell for Albert Speer
Lighting Designer of the Year	Jennifer Lal for Oho Ake
Most Original Production of the Year	Sniper by The 24/7 Project & BATS Theatre
Most Promising Female Newcomer of the Year	Danielle Mason in Collected Stories
Most Promising Male Newcomer of the Year	Kip Chapman in Big River
Most Promising New Director of the Year	Ryan Hartigan for After Kafka
Outstanding Composer of Original Music	Jane Pierard for Sniper
Outstanding Performance	Danielle Mason in The Shape of Things
Outstanding Performance	Matt Wilson in Vincent in Brixton
Peter Harcourt Award for Outstanding New Playwright of the Year	Brian Sergent for The Love of Humankind
Production of the Year	Albert Speer by Albert Speer Collective
Set Designer of the Year	John Parker for Big River
Sound Designer of the Year	Steve Gallagher for Oho Ake
Supporting Actress of the Year	Heather O'Carroll for The Shape of Things
Supporting Actor of the Year	KC Kelly in Macbeth
The Absolutely Positively Outstanding New New Zealand Play of the Year	Niu Sila by Oscar Kightley and Dave Armstrong

== 2005 awards ==
Award	Winner
Actress of the Year	Mia Blake in Bash
Actor of the Year	Malcolm Murray in I.D.
Costume Designer of the Year	Donna Jefferis for The Cherry Orchard
Director of the Year	David Lawrence for I.D.
Lighting Designer of the Year	Jennifer Lal for Hinepau
Mayor's Award for Significant Contribution to Theatre	Dorothy McKegg
Most Original Production of the Year	Head by BATS Theatre, Nightsong Productions and Theatre Stampede
Most Promising Female Newcomer of the Year	Erin Banks in A Midsummer Night's Dream
Most Promising Male Newcomer of the Year	Nathan Meister in Kikia Te Po
Most Promising New Director of the Year	Katie Wolfe for The Women
Outstanding Composer of Original Music	Stephen Gallagher for Hinepau
Outstanding Performance	Jason Whyte in The Tutor
Outstanding Performance	Teodor Surcel in Gloomy Sunday
Peter Harcourt Award for Outstanding New Playwright of the Year	Lauren Jackson for Exchange
Production of the Year	I.D. by The Bacchanals, directed by David Lawrence
Set Designer of the Year	John Hodgkins for Bright Star
Sound Designer of the Year	Paddy Bleakley and David Lawrence for Baghdad, Baby!
Supporting Actor of the Year	Alex Greig for I.D.
Supporting Actress of the Year	Jane Waddell for Bright Star
The Absolutely Positively Outstanding New New Zealand Play of the Year	The Tutor by Dave Armstrong

== 2006 awards ==
The 2006 winners were announced at an award ceremony hosted by mayor Kerry Prendergast on 7 December 2006.

Award	Winner
Actress of the Year	Carol Smith in The Country
Actor of the Year	George Henare in Death of a Salesman
Costume Designer of the Year	Gillie Coxill for The Rivals
Director of the Year	Susan Wilson for Death of a Salesman
Lighting Designer of the Year	Martyn Roberts for Yours Truly
Mayor's Award for Significant Contribution to the Theatre	Grant Tilly
Most Original Production of the Year	Yours Truly
Most Promising Female Newcomer of the Year	Rachel Forman in Fool For Love
Most Promising Male Newcomer of the Year	James Ashcroft in The Brilliant Fassah
Most Promising New Director of the Year	Lyndee-Jane Rutherford for Lovepuke
Outstanding Composer of Original Music	Peter Daube for Stories Told To Me By Girls
Outstanding Performance	Jennifer Ludlam in Death of a Salesman
Outstanding Performance	Malcolm Murray in The Country
Peter Harcourt Award for Outstanding New Playwright of the Year	Sonya Stewart for Wheel
Production of the Year	Yours Truly by Left of Centre Productions
Set Designer of the Year	John Hodgkins for Master Class
Sound Designer of the Year	Matthew Lambourn for Dr. Buller's Birds
Supporting Actor of the Year	Julian Wilson in The Underpants
Supporting Actress of the Year	Heather O'Carroll in The Country
The Absolutely Positively Outstanding New New Zealand Play of the Year	Yours Truly by Albert Belz

== 2007 awards ==
The 2007 winners were announced on 3 December 2007.

Award	Winner
Actress of the Year	Mel Dodge in Uncle Vanya
Actor of the Year	Grant Tilly in Home Land
Costume Designer of the Year	Gillie Coxill for Uncle Vanya
Director of the Year	Jane Waddell for Home Land
Lighting Designer of the Year	Martyn Roberts for Maui - One Man Against the Gods
Mayor's Award for Significant Contribution to the Theatre	Bill Guest, Associate Director and Head of Entertainment Technology & Performing Arts Management, Toi Whakaari: New Zealand Drama School
Most Original Production of the Year	Hotel
Most Promising Female Newcomer of the Year	Jodie Hillock in Home Land
Most Promising Male Newcomer of the Year	Michael Whalley in The Cape
Most Promising New Director of the Year	Willem Wassenaar for Angels in America Part 1: Millennium Approaches
Outstanding Composer of Original Music	Gareth Farr for Maui - One Man Against the Gods
Outstanding Performance	Rachel Forman in Blackbird
Outstanding Performance	Emmet Michael Kennedy in Shining City
Peter Harcourt Award for Outstanding New Playwright of the Year	Rob Mokaraka and Paolo Rotondo for Strange Resting Places
Production of the Year	Home Land
Set Designer of the Year	Brian King for The Hollow Men
Sound Designer of the Year	Stephen Gallagher for Shining City
Supporting Actor of the Year	Gavin Rutherford in Uncle Vanya
Supporting Actress of the Year	Jennifer Ludlam in Othello
The Absolutely Positively Outstanding New New Zealand Play of the Year	Home Land by Gary Henderson

== 2008 awards ==
The 2008 awards were announced on 7 December 2008.

Award	Winner
Actress of the Year	Ali Harpur in Bombshells
Actor of the Year	Brian Hotter in Heat
Costume Designer of the Year	Kathyrn Tyree for The Kreutzer
Director of the Year	Tim Spite for Paua
Lighting Designer of the Year	Lisa Maule for The American Pilot
Mayor's Award for Significant Contribution to the Theatre	Sunny Amey
Most Original Production of the Year	Apollo 13: Mission Control, by HACKMAN and BATS Theatre
Most Promising Female Newcomer of the Year	Brooke Williams in Mr. Marmalade
Most Promising Male Newcomer of the Year	Arthur Meek in On the Conditions and Possibilities of Helen Clark Taking Me as Her Young Lover
Most Promising New Director of the Year	Sophie Roberts for Mr. Marmalade
Outstanding Composer of Original Music	Jonathan Crayford for Adagio
Outstanding Performance	Kip Chapman in The Little Dog Laughed
Outstanding Performance	Simon Vincent in Metamorphosis
Peter Harcourt Award for Outstanding New Playwright of the Year	Eli Kent for Rubber Turkey
Production of the Year	Mr. Marmalade by The Moving Theatre Company
Set Designer of the Year	Daniel Williams for The Little Dog Laughed
Sound Designer of the Year	Gareth Ruck for Apollo 13: Mission Control
Supporting Actress of the Year	Michele Amas/Jane Waddell in Mammals
Supporting Actor of the Year	Felix Preval in Sensible Susan and the Queen's Merkin; A Morality Play
The Absolutely Positively Outstanding New New Zealand Play of the Year	Where We Once Belonged adapted by Dave Armstrong from the novel by Sia Figiel

== 2009 awards ==
The 2009 awards were announced on 6 December 2009.

Award	Winner
Actress of the Year	Erin Banks in A Brief History of Helen of Troy
Actor of the Year	Jed Brophy in The Blackening
Costume Designer of the Year	Dawa Devereux for A Most Outrageous Humbug
Director of the Year	Tim Spite for Biography of My Skin AND Leo Gene Peters for Death and the Dreamlife of Elephants [Joint winners]
Lighting Designer of the Year	Adam Walker for Death and the Dreamlife of Elephants
Mayor's Award for Significant Contribution to the Theatre	Bill Sheat
Most Original Production of the Year	The Intricate Art of Actually Caring, by The Playground Collective
Most Promising Female Newcomer of the Year	Sophie Roberts in Wolf's Lair
Most Promising Male Newcomer of the Year	Jack Shadbolt in The Intricate Art of Actually Caring
Most Promising New Director of the Year	Eleanor Bishop for The Intricate Art of Actually Caring
Outstanding Composer of Original Music	Erika Grant, Isaac Smith & Amanda Mclean for Bedlam
Outstanding Performance	Geraldine Brophy in Blood Wedding
Outstanding Performance	Miranda Harcourt in Biography of My Skin
Peter Harcourt Award for Outstanding New Playwright of the Year	Arthur Meek for Collapsing Creation
Production of the Year	Collapsing Creation by Downstage Theatre and Conditional Productions
Set Designer of the Year	Tracey Monastra for Death and the Dreamlife of Elephants
Sound Designer of the Year	Stephen Gallagher for The Blackening
Supporting Actress of the Year	Michele Amas in Rock 'n' Roll
Supporting Actor of the Year	Christopher Brougham in Collapsing Creation
The Absolutely Positively Outstanding New New Zealand Play of the Year	Collapsing Creation by Arthur Meek

== 2010 awards ==
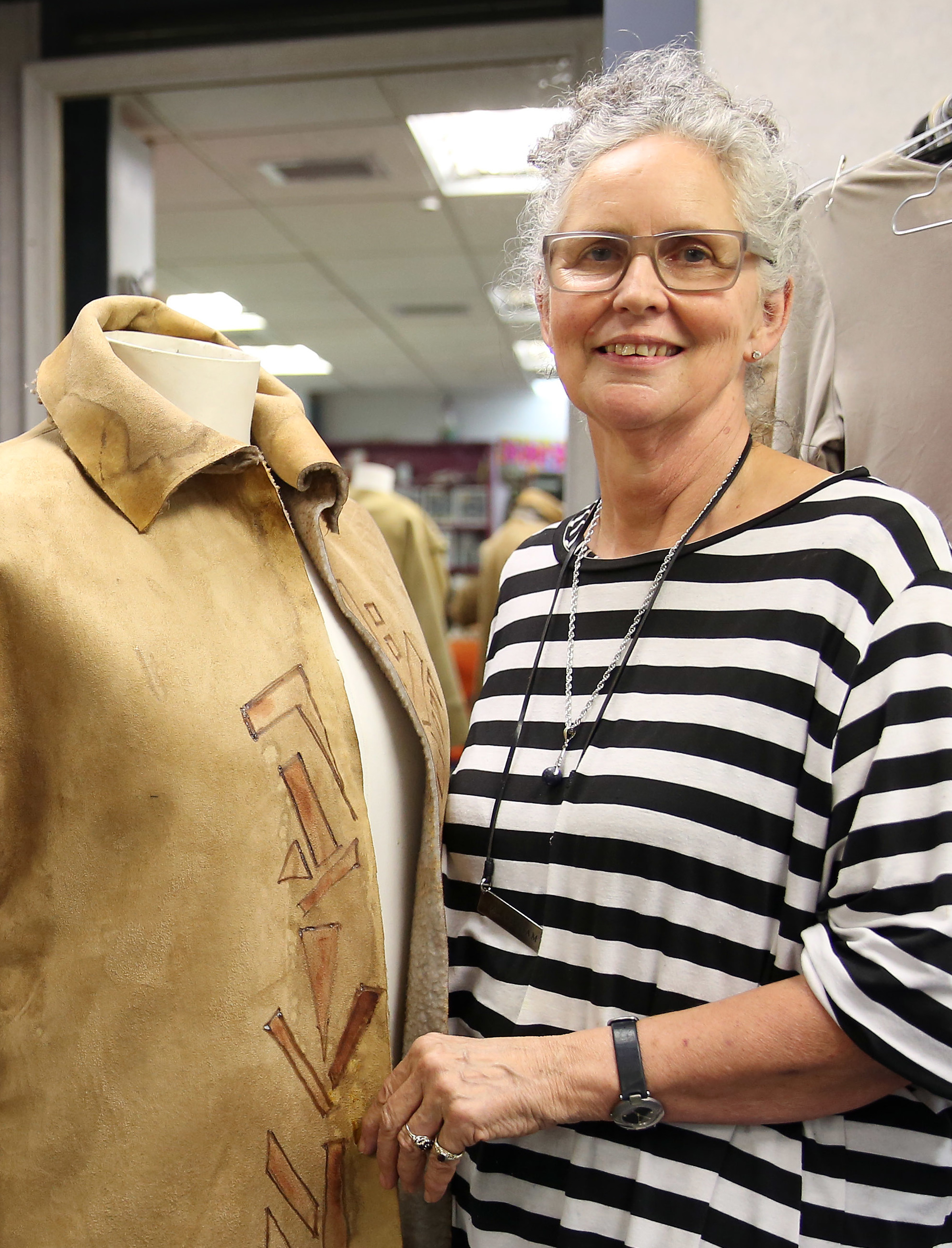
Elizabeth Whiting - costume designer of the year 2010

The 2010 awards were announced on 5 December 2010 at Wellington Opera House. A Critics' Wildcard Award was introduced this year, for "outstanding work in an area not otherwise covered by the awards".

Award	Winner
Actress of the Year	Sophie Hambleton in Katydid
Actor of the Year	Jacob Rajan in The Guru of Chai
Costume Designer of the Year	Elizabeth Whiting for The Arrival
Director of the Year	Julie Nolan for The Arrival
Lighting Designer of the Year	Jennifer Lal for The December Brother
Mayor's Award for Significant Contribution to the Theatre	Richard Cathie
Most Original Production of the Year	The Arrival by Red Leap Theatre Company
Most Promising Female Newcomer of the Year	Ella Becroft in The Arrival
Most Promising Male Newcomer of the Year	Paul Waggott in Dog Sees God: Confessions of a Teenage Blockhead
Most Promising New Director of the Year	Charlotte Bradley for Katydid
Outstanding Composer of Original Music	David Ward for The Guru of Chai
Outstanding Performance	Peter Hambleton in The Letter Writer
Outstanding Performance	Christopher Brougham in Me and Robert McKee
Peter Harcourt Award for Outstanding New Playwright of the Year	Lucy O'Brien for Katydid
Production of the Year	The Arrival by Red Leap Theatre Company
Set Designer of the Year	John Verryt for The Arrival
Sound Designer of the Year	Gill Eva Craig for The December Brother
Supporting Actress of the Year	Darlene Mohekey in Shipwrecked! An Entertainment
Supporting Actor of the Year	Christopher Brougham – Dead Man's Cell Phone
The Absolutely Positively Outstanding New New Zealand Play of the Year	One of The Second Test by Jonathan Brugh, Katydid by Lucy O'Brien and The Guru of Chai by Jacob Rajan, Justin Lewis
Critics' Wild Card Award	Kenny King and Rebekah Sherratt, "for ‘animating the set’ in Capital E National Theatre for Children’s End Game."

== 2011 awards ==
The 2011 awards were presented at the Wellington Opera House on 4 December, as follows:

Award	Winner
Actress of the Year	Jennifer Ludlam in August: Osage County
Actor of the Year	Jarod Rawiri in I, George Nepia
Costume Designer of the Year	Gillie Coxill for The Spy Who Wouldn't Die Again
Director of the Year	Jason Te Kare for I, George Nepia
Lighting Designer of the Year	Marcus McShane for When the Rain Stops Falling
Mayor's Award for Significant Contribution to the Theatre	Jim Moriarty
Most Original Production of the Year	Hear to See by Capital E National Theatre for Children
Most Promising Female Newcomer of the Year	Lauren Gibson in August: Osage County
Most Promising Male Newcomer of the Year	Simon K Leary in Mates & Lovers
Most Promising New Director of the Year	Jason Te Kare for I, George Nepia
Outstanding Composer of Original Music	Richard Nunns for Hear to See
Outstanding Performance	Michelle Amas in August: Osage County
Outstanding Performance	Phil Grieve in Slouching Toward Bethlehem
Peter Harcourt Award for Outstanding New Playwright of the Year	Ralph McCubbin Howell for The Engine Room
Production of the Year	I, George Nepia by Tawata Productions
Set Designer of the Year	Andrew Foster for The Lead Wait
Sound Designer of the Year	Chris Ward for The Lead Wait
Supporting Actress of the Year	Erin Banks for The Engine Room
Supporting Actor of the Year	Christopher Brougham for When the Rain Stops Falling
The Absolutely Positively Outstanding New New Zealand Play of the Year	Slouching Toward Bethlehem by Dean Parker
Critics' Wild Card Award	Johann Nortje "for his body of work as an AV Designer on Hear to See, When the Rain Stops Falling, Wake Less"

== 2012 awards ==
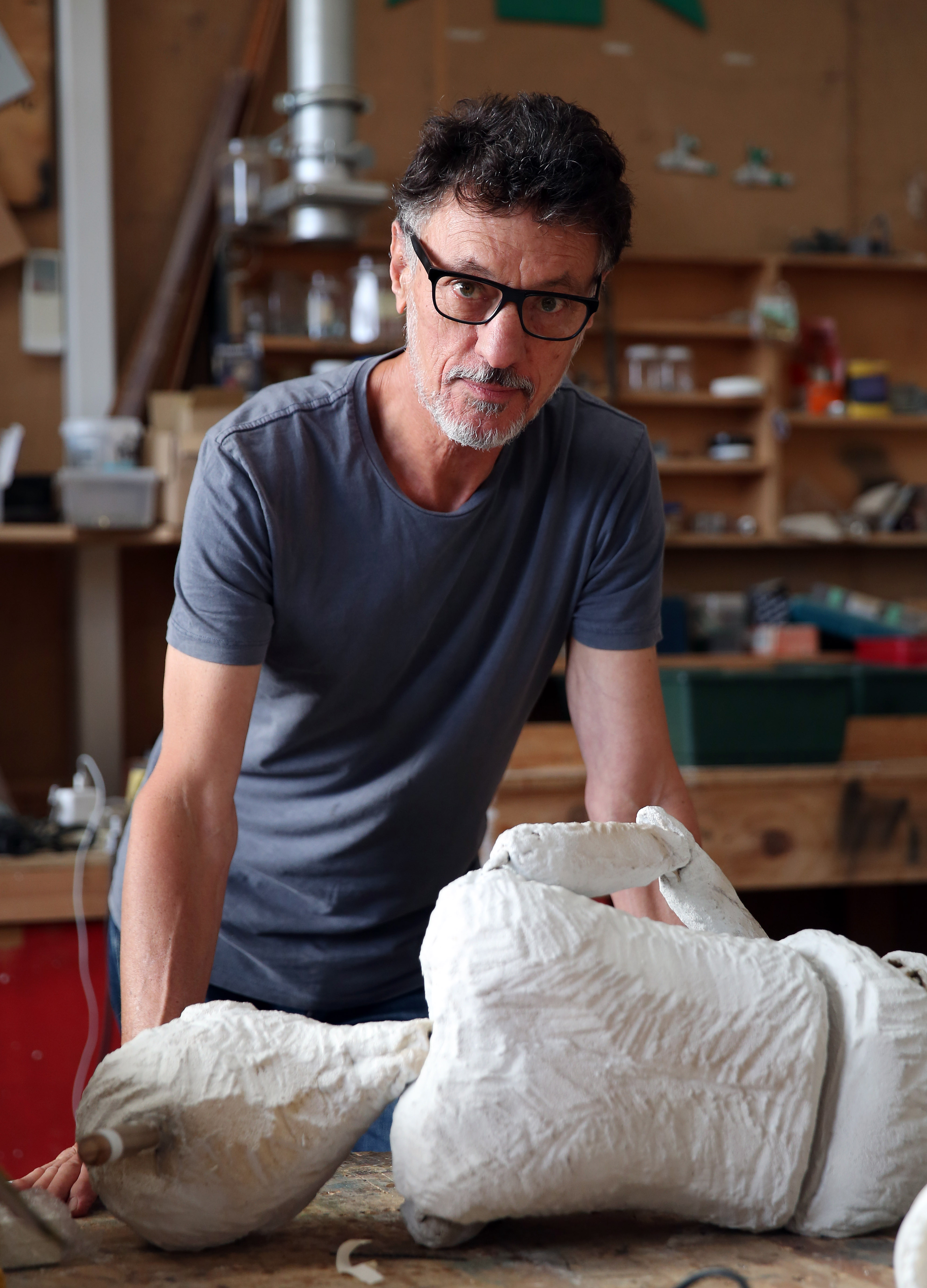
John Verryt - set designer of the year 2012

The 2012 awards were presented on 9 December 2012 at the Paramount Theatre, Wellington, as follows:

Award	Winner
Actress of the Year	Elena Stejko in A Shortcut to Happiness
Actor of the Year	Tom Monckton in Moving Stationery
Costume Designer of the Year	Shona Tawhiao for The Māori Troilus and Cressida – Toroihi Rāua Ko Kāhira
Director of the Year	Rachel House for The Māori Troilus and Cressida – Toroihi Rāua Ko Kāhira
Lighting Designer of the Year	Jennifer Lal for Into the Uncanny Valley
Mayor's Award for Significant Contribution to the Theatre	Dawn Sanders, CEO of Shakespeare Globe Centre New Zealand
Most Original Production of the Year	Paper Sky by Red Leap Theatre
Most Promising Female Newcomer of the Year	Victoria Abbott in West End Girls
Most Promising Male Newcomer of the Year	Tim Carlsen in One Day Moko
Most Promising New Director of the Year	Tammy Davis for The Prospect
Outstanding Composer of Original Music	Laughton Pattrick for Around the World and Buck Again
Outstanding Performance	Richard Dey in All My Sons
Outstanding Performance	Te Kohe Tuhaka in Michael James Manaia
Peter Harcourt Award for Outstanding New Playwright of the Year	Maraea Rakuraku for The Prospect
Production of the Year	The Māori Troilus and Cressida – Toroihi Rāua Ko Kāhira by Ngākau Toa
Set Designer of the Year	John Verryt for Paper Sky
Sound Designer of the Year	Chris Ward for Peninsula
Supporting Actress of the Year	Nancy Brunning in Clybourne Park
Supporting Actor of the Year	Rob Lloyd for The Prospect
The Absolutely Positively Outstanding New New Zealand Play of the Year	Peninsula by Gary Henderson
Critics' Wild Card Award	Vance Fontaine and his Peculiar Sensations: Greg Ellis, Thom McGrath, Tane Upjohn-Beatson, Takumi Motokawa, Matiu Whiting

== 2013 awards ==
The 2013 awards were presented on 15 December 2013 at the Paramount Cinema in Wellington, as follows:

Award	Winner
Actress of the Year	Erin Banks in Tribes
Actor of the Year	Byron Coll in Midsummer - A Play With Songs
Costume Designer of the Year	Kasia Pol for Sydney Bridge Upside Down
Director of the Year	Geoff Pinfield for The Magic Chicken
Lighting Designer of the Year	Marcus McShane for Broken River
Mayor's Award for Significant Contribution to the Theatre	The Founders of Playmarket: Robert Lord, Nonnita Rees, Judy Russell, Ian Fraser
Most Original Production of the Year	Squidboy by Theatre Beating
Most Promising Female Newcomer of the Year	Hayley Sproull in Outsider’s Guide
Most Promising Male Newcomer of the Year	Joe Dekkers-Reihana in Coriolanus
Most Promising New Director of the Year	Hannah Smith for The Road That Wasn’t There
Outstanding Composer of Original Music	Gareth Farr for Duck, Death and the Tulip
Outstanding Performance	Renee Lyons in Nick: An Accidental Hero
Peter Harcourt Award for Outstanding New Playwright of the Year	Sarita Keo Kossamak So for Neang Neak’s Legacy
Production of the Year	The Road That Wasn’t There by Trick of the Light Theatre
Set Designer of the Year	Andrew Foster for Red
Sound Designer of the Year	Tane Upjohn-Beatson for Broken River
Supporting Actress of the Year	Nancy Brunning in Neang Neak’s Legacy
Supporting Actor of the Year	Aaron Cortesi in Sydney Bridge Upside Down
The Absolutely Positively Outstanding New New Zealand Play of the Year	The Road That Wasn’t There by Ralph McCubbin Howell
Critics' Wild Card Award	The Bacchanals

== 2014 awards ==
The 2014 awards were presented on Sunday 14 December 2014, at the Paramount Theatre in Wellington, as follows:

Award	Winner
Actress of the Year	Erin Banks in Constellations
Actor of the Year	Gavin Rutherford in A View From the Bridge
Costume Designer of the Year	Donna Jefferis for Equivocation
Director of the Year	Peter Hambleton for Equivocation
Lighting Designer of the Year	Rowan McShane for A Play About Fear
Mayor's Award for Significant Contribution to the Theatre	Simon Bennett and Simon Elson "for their restructure of Bats Theatre in 1989"
Most Original Production of the Year	Dinner with Izzy and Simon by Isobel MacKinnon and Simon Haren
Most Promising Female Newcomer of the Year	Neenah Dekkers-Reihana in 4 Billion Likes
Most Promising Male Newcomer of the Year	Tom Eason in Equivocation
Most Promising New Director of the Year	Samuel Phillips for A Midsummer Night's Dream
Outstanding Composer of Original Music	David Ward for Kiss The Fish
Outstanding Performance	Hannah Banks in Watch
Peter Harcourt Award for Outstanding New Playwright of the Year	Chris Molloy for Putorino Hill
Production of the Year	Equivocation by Circa Theatre
Set Designer of the Year	Meg Rollandi for Watch
Sound Designer of the Year	Tane Upjohn-Beatson for Watch
Supporting Actress of the Year	Julia Croft in Kiss The Fish
Supporting Actor of the Year	Calum Gittins in Riding In Cars With Mostly Straight Boys
The Absolutely Positively Outstanding New New Zealand Play of the Year	Kiss The Fish by Jacob Rajan and Justin Lewis
Critics' Wild Card Award	Deb McGuire, "for technical operation and extraordinary support beyond the call of duty."
