= The Sound Inside (play) =

Play by Adam Rapp

- Original language: English
- Written by: Adam Rapp

Premiere
- Date: June 27, 2018
- Place: Williamstown Theatre Festival

The Sound Inside is a play written by Adam Rapp. The play premiered at the Williamstown Theatre Festival, running from June 27 to July 8, 2018. The production was directed by David Cromer and starred Mary-Louise Parker and Will Hochman. The play premiered on Broadway at Studio 54 with the same cast and creative team, premiering in previews on September 14, 2019 and officially on October 17. It closed on January 12, 2020. The play received six Tony Award nominations, including for Best Play; Parker won the Tony Award for Best Actress in a Play. International stagings include a 2025 production at Circa Theatre in Wellington New Zealand, directed by Stella Reid and starring Dulcie Smart and Kieran Charnock. Broadway World described the performances as a masterclass in subtlety and emotional precision. The production won in 5 categories at the 2025 Wellington Theatre Awards including Director of the Year for Stella Reid, Outstanding Performance for Dulcie Smart and Set Designer of the Year for Meg Rollandi.

== Awards and nominations ==
Year	Award	Category	Nominee	Result
2020	Tony Awards	Best Play		Nominated
2020	Tony Awards	Best Performance by a Leading Actress in a Play	Mary-Louise Parker	Won
2020	Tony Awards	Best Direction of a Play	David Cromer	Nominated
2020	Tony Awards	Best Original Score	Daniel Kluger	Nominated
2020	Tony Awards	Best Lighting Design of a Play	Heather Gilbert	Nominated
2020	Tony Awards	Best Sound Design of a Play	Daniel Kluger	Nominated
2020	Drama Desk Award	Outstanding Lighting Design for a Play	Heather Gilbert	Won
2020	Outer Critics Circle Awards			
2020	Outer Critics Circle Awards	Outstanding New Broadway Play		Honoree
2020	Outer Critics Circle Awards	Outstanding Director of a Play	David Cromer	Honoree
2020	Outer Critics Circle Awards	Outstanding Actress in a Play	Mary-Louise Parker	Honoree
2020	Outer Critics Circle Awards	Outstanding Actor in a Play	Will Hochman	Honoree
2020	Outer Critics Circle Awards	Outstanding Lighting Design	Heather Gilbert	Honoree
2020	Outer Critics Circle Awards	Outstanding Projection Design	Aaron Rhyne	Honoree
2020	Outer Critics Circle Awards	Outstanding Sound Design	Daniel Kluger	Honoree
