= Ken Blackburn (actor) =

New Zealand actor and writer (born 1935)

Ken Blackburn MNZM
- Born: Kenneth Colster Blackburn; 1935 (age 90–91); Horfield, Bristol, England
- Education: Clifton College, Bristol (1948–1952); Wellington High School, New Zealand
- Occupations: Actor, director, writer
- Years active: 1955–present
- Known for: Gliding On; Shortland Street; Xena: Warrior Princess; Farscape

Kenneth Colster Blackburn MNZM (born 1935) is a New Zealand actor, director and writer. He has worked in film, television, radio and theatre in New Zealand, Australia and the United Kingdom since 1963.

== Early life ==
Blackburn was born in April 1935, at the Bristol Royal Infirmary in England and was raised alongside his older brother John. He attended Clifton College from 1948 to 1952. After the Second World War ended, his family emigrated to New Zealand, where he completed his education at Wellington High School.

His experiences as a child in World War II England are documented in his memoir "Blitz Kids", about the Bristol Blitz, in which as a wartime refugee, he repeatedly ran away from billets, while trying to return to his family. The book was published in 1995, to celebrate the 50th anniversary of VE Day.

== Career ==
In the mid 1950s, Blackburn appeared in an early New Zealand Players production of Saint Joan. He then headed back to England, where he acted under American director Sam Wanamaker in Liverpool for a year, but soon relocated to New Zealand. Finding the early Australasian theatre scene unsustainable, Blackburn spent five years as a high school teacher, before the advent of Wellington's Downstage Theatre in 1964 afforded him to act full time for the following decade.

Blackburn's first television role was in the 1963 TV play All Earth to Love. In 1975 he appeared in soap opera Close to Home, as Clive Foster. He also had a main role in Hunter’s Gold, which aired internationally. In 1977, he appeared in Australian series Glenview High, as teacher Mr Phillips and New Zealand drama Moynihan. He also began starring in more prominent film roles, with a lead in 1978 film Skin Deep.

Blackburn's best-known screen role in New Zealand was as the boss in office sitcom Gliding On, from 1981 to 1985, and based on Roger Hall's hit play Glide Time. In the 1980s, he also appeared in miniseries Brotherhood of the Rose. Other television credits include Sea Urchins, Mortimer's Patch, The Adventures of Swiss Family Robinson, and White Fang.

In the early 1990s, Blackburn appeared in a recurring role in long-running soap opera Shortland Street, playing Sir Bruce Warner. Further film roles included Bad Blood, Pictures, and 1996 Peter Jackson film The Frighteners. He also featured in drama Life is for Living (2015), which went on to win numerous festival awards. The same year, he appeared in two internationally-directed films, American western Slow West alongside Kodi Smit-McPhee, Michael Fassbender and Ben Mendelsohn and British period drama Sunset Song.

Blackburn is best known internationally for his roles in American fantasy series Xena: Warrior Princess and Australian/American sci-fi series Farscape. His more recent television credits include New Zealand series The Brokenwood Mysteries and American fantasy series Legend of the Seeker, The Lord of the Rings: The Rings of Power and Sweet Tooth.

Blackburn has also an extensive career as a stage performer, including appearing in self-devised show An Evening with Dickens and touring with the New Zealand Symphony Orchestra as narrator for A Midsummer Night's Dream. In 1999, his performance as Vladimir in Waiting for Godot earned him the Best Actor award at the Chapman Tripp Theatre Awards. In the 2005 Queen's Birthday Honours, he was appointed a Member of the New Zealand Order of Merit, for services to the performing arts.

In 2022, Blackburn featured in television commercials for Amazon and Kiwi Lager.

== Personal life ==
Blackburn lives in Wellington, New Zealand, together with his wife Carolyn.

== Filmography ==
=== Film ===
Year	Title	Role	Notes
1975	479	Robert James	
1978	Skin Deep	Bob Warner	
1981	Pictures	Commander James Gilchrist	
1981	Bad Blood	Thommo Robson	
1984	Tommy Knockers	Newt Berringer	
1987	Ngati	Agent	
1988	The Grasscutter	Inspector Lerwick	
1989	The Roar	Ken Scott	
1992	Absent Without Leave	Captain Barrett	
1996	The Frighteners	Dr Kamins	
2005	King Kong	Stage Manager	
2010	One Hearse Town	Jack	Short film
2010	If We Are to be Eaten by Wolves	Nicholas	Short film
2011	Rest for the Wicked	Mr Hayes	
2011	Antonio's Secret	Antonio Berglas	Short film
2012	Strongman: The Tragedy	Mr Tucker	
2013	Life is for Living	Albert	Short film
2014	Movie	Doctor	Short film
2015	Slow West	Josh McKenzie	
2015	Life is for Living	Albert Fivell	Short film
2015	Sunset Song	Galt	
2020	Poppy	Uncle Fred	Short film

=== Television ===
Year	Title	Role	Notes
1972	An Awful Silence	Mr Redwood	TV movie
1976	The Park Terrace Murder	Mr Joynt	TV movie
1976–1977	Moynihan	Brian Crosby	8 episodes
1977	Hunter's Gold	Baddock	7 episodes
1977	The Mackenzie Affair	Henry Tancred	Miniseries, 2 episodes
1977	The Governor	Admiral Henry Keppell	1 episode
1977–1978	Kirby's Company	Bill Kirby	18 episodes
1978	Glenview High	Reg Casey	1 episode
1979	Chopper Squad		1 episode
1979	Golden Soak	Sergeant Reynolds	Miniseries, 3 episodes
1979	Patrol Boat	Commander Johns	1 episode
1979	A Place in the World		Miniseries, 1 episode
1980	Close to Home	Clive Foster	1 episode
1980; 1981	Mortimer's Patch	Detective Inspector Chris Knight	2 episodes
1981	Comedy Playhouse		
1982	Casualties of Peace	Tripod	TV movie
1983	An Age Apart	Doctor	1 episode
1983	Nearly No Christmas	Undertaker	TV movie
1984–1985	Gliding On	The Boss	
1985	Hanlon	John Fraser QC	1 episode
1987	Steel Riders	Inspector Hawley	2 episodes
1988	Erebus: The Aftermath	Colin Nicholson	Miniseries, 4 episodes
1989	Brotherhood of the Rose	Forbes	Miniseries, 2 episodes
1989	The Flying Doctors	Jake	1 episode
1990	Betty's Bunch	The Charmer	9 episodes
1990–1991	Shark in the Park	Superintendent	4 episodes
1991	Which Way Home	Officer Carmody	Miniseries
1991	The Sound and the Silence	Elisha Gray	TV movie
1991	Gold: The World's Play	Shadrach	TV movie
1991–1992	Gold	Shadrach	4 episodes
1992	The Ray Bradbury Theater	Policeman / Timulty	2 episodes
1992–1995	Shortland Street	Sir Bruce Warner	66 episodes
1993	The Rainbow Warrior	Gerard Curry	TV movie
1993–1994	White Fang	Hank Blair	32 episodes
1995	Hercules: The Legendary Journeys	Atreus	1 episode
1995	Letter to Blanchy	Len	1 episode
1996	Xena: Warrior Princess	King Menelaus	1 episode
1998	Duggan	Sensei	1 episode
1998	The Adventures of Swiss Family Robinson	Oscar Wyss	8 episodes
1998	The Legend of William Tell	Commissioner Esdras	3 episodes
1999	Farscape	Hybin	1 episode
2000	Dark Knight	Duke of Bressingham	1 episode
2001	Atlantis High	Mr Dorsey	1 episode
2003	The Strip	Finn's Father	1 episode
2009	Until Proven Innocent	Appeal Court Judge	TV movie
2010	Legend of the Seeker	Brother Joseph	Season 2, 1 episode
2011	Whiskey Island (aka Emilie Richards)	Joshua	Miniseries, 1 episode
2011	Strongman	Mr Tucker	Docudrama
2011	What Really Happened: Women's Vote	Speaker	Miniseries
2013	The Forgotten General	Sir James Allen	Miniseries
2016	Hillary	Sir Malcolm	1 episode
2015–2017	The Brokenwood Mysteries	Edward	Seasons 2–4, 3 episodes
2022; 2024	The Lord of the Rings: The Rings of Power	Tar-Palantir	4 episodes
2024	Sweet Tooth	Paul	Season 3, 1 episode
2025	Alice and Steve	Barry	

=== Video games ===
Year	Title	Role	Notes
2012	Path of Exile	Eramir	

== Theatre ==
=== As actor ===
Year	Title	Role	Notes	Ref.
1955	Saint Joan		Wellington Grand Opera House with New Zealand Players	
1966	Operation Pigstick	Prime Minister Polycork	Downstage Theatre, Wellington	
1967	The Cage		Downstage Theatre, Wellington	
1968	Brand		New Theatre, Wellington	
1974	Macbeth		Mercury Theatre, Auckland	
1976	Christie in Love		Downstairs Theatre, Unity Theatre, Wellington	
1977	Knock Knock		Circa Theatre, Wellington	
1978	Candide	Voltaire / Host	Hannah Playhouse, Wellington with Downstage Theatre	
1980	A Shotgun Wedding		Circa Theatre, Wellington	
1981	The Gin Game		Circa Theatre, Wellington	
1983	Chicago		Mercury Theatre, Auckland	
1983	Pass the Butler		Mercury Theatre, Auckland	
1984	Glide Time		TVNZ Enterprises	
1997	The Sisterhood		Circa Theatre, Wellington	
1997	Taking Sides		Circa Theatre, Wellington	
1997	Travels with My Aunt		Circa Theatre, Wellington	
1999	Waiting for Godot	Vladimir	Circa Theatre, Wellington	
1999	Julius Caesar	Julius Caesar	Circa Theatre, Wellington	
2000	Double Beat	Frank Donald Senior	Downstage Theatre, Wellington, Circa Theatre, Wellington	
2000	The Country Wife		Circa Theatre, Wellington	
2000	Rutherford		Circa Theatre, Wellington	
2000	The Seagull		Circa Theatre, Wellington	
2002	A New Zealand Homecoming: Te Hokinga Mai		Tour of Canada & England	
2004	Foolish Acts	Various characters	Circa Theatre, Wellington, Downstage Theatre, Wellington	
2005	Democracy	Herbert Wehner	Circa Theatre, Wellington	
2005	Bright Star	Rev Edward Hill	Circa Theatre, Wellington	
2005	The Cherry Orchard	Pischyk	Circa Theatre, Wellington	
2005	Milo's Wake	Milo O'Connor	Circa Theatre, Wellington	
2007	Who Wants to Be 100?	Alan Webster	Court Theatre, Christchurch	
2009	4 Flats Whites in Italy	Harry	Court Theatre, Christchurch	
2009	Entertaining Mr Sloane	Lead role	Circa Theatre, Wellington	
2011	Othello	Duke / Clown / Gratiano	Peach Theatre Company	
2012	Death of a Salesman	Ben / various characters	Peach Theatre Company	
2013	Anne Boleyn	Parrot / Courtier / Countryman	Auckland Theatre Company	
2013	Motel	Motel Manager	Basement Theatre	
2014	The Caretaker	Mac Davies	Fortune Theatre, Dunedin	
2015	Heroes	Phillipe	Auckland Theatre Company	
2016	King Lear	Gloucester	Circa Theatre, Wellington	
2017	Three Days in the Country	Bolshintsov	Circa Theatre, Wellington	

=== As director / producer ===
Year	Title	Role	Notes	Ref.
1964	Amahl and the Night Visitors	Producer	St Peter's Church on Willis, Wellington	
1969	The Land of Smiles	Producer	Opera Centre with Opera Technique	
1972	Flint	Director	Downstage Theatre, Wellington	
1972	When Did You Last See My Mother	Director	Star Boating Club	
1980	Time & Time Again	Director	Williams and Cooper Productions	
1980	Silly Buggers	Director	Circa Theatre, Wellington	

== Publication ==
Year	Title	Publisher	Ref.
1995	Blitz Kids	BBC	

== Awards ==
Year	Work	Award	Category	Result
1974	Ken Blackburn	Polish Ministry of Culture	Amicus Poloniae	Honoured
1999	Waiting for Godot	Chapman Tripp Theatre Awards	Best Actor	Won
2005	Ken Blackburn	Queen's Birthday Honours	MNZM for Services to the Performing Arts	Honoured
2011	Antonio's Secret	Las Vegas Short Film Festival Awards	Best Actor	Won
2014	The Caretaker	Dunedin Arts Festival	Best Actor	Won
2014	Life is for Living	Oklahoma Film Festival Awards	Best Short Film	Won
2015	Life is for Living	Byron Bay Film Festival	Best International Short Film	Won
2015	Life is for Living	Byron Bay Film Festival	Audience Choice Award for Best Short Film	Won
2015	Life is for Living	IFFEHC – Jakarta	International Award of Outstanding Excellence	Won
2015	Life is for Living	World Film Awards – Jakarta	Golden World Award	Won
2015	Life is for Living	Kiwi International Film Festival	Best Kiwi Short Film	Won
2017	Ken Blackburn	NZ Actors Equity / MEAA	Equity Lifetime Achievement Award	Won
2019	Ken Blackburn	48 Hour Film Challenge	Best Actor Award	Won
