= Malcolm Murray (actor) =

New Zealand actor (born 1964)

Malcolm Alan Murray
- Born: 24 July 1964; Oamaru, New Zealand
- Occupation: actor

Malcolm Alan Murray (born 24 July 1964) is a New Zealand stage and television actor, best known for his role as Dr Alan Dubrovsky in the television soap opera Shortland Street between 1999 and 2001. In 2005 he won the Actor of the Year award at the Chapman Tripp Theatre Awards in Wellington for his portrayal of Dimitri Tsafendas in the Antony Sher play I.D.

== Biography ==
Born in Oamaru, Malcolm grew up on his family's North Otago farm, where he worked as a farmer after leaving secondary school. Subsequently he worked as a Ministry of Agriculture farm consultant before studying journalism at Aoraki Polytechnic, from where he graduated in 1991. He then worked as a rural reporter for The Press newspaper in Christchurch until the end of 1993, before studying drama at Toi Whakaari New Zealand Drama School, graduating in 1995. He played Bottom in the graduating class's production of A Midsummer Night's Dream.

His first production after graduating was the critically acclaimed Knot A Problem—a solo show that he wrote while at drama school loosely based on his own life—at BATS Theatre in Wellington as part of the 1996 New Zealand Fringe Festival. Later that year he played a Scottish doctor in The Vampyre Dances at Circa Theatre in Wellington. He then appeared as Brian Fraser in Market Forces, Roger Hall's sequel to Glide Time and Gliding On, at Centrepoint Theatre in Palmerston North at the end of 1996.

In 1997, Murray returned to Centrepoint, playing a variety of characters in Travels with My Aunt, adapted by Giles Havergal from the novel of the same name by Graham Greene. He then followed that up with the role of a Russian tourist, Konstantin, in the premiere of David Geary's comedy The Farm, at the same theatre, before appearing in Hamlet, also at Centrepoint.

Murray reprised his monologue, Knot A Problem, at Circa in Wellington in early 1998. That March he appeared in Sing Whale as part of the International Festival of the Arts in Wellington, before taking Knot A Problem to various venues including Repertory House in Invercargill in April and Centrepoint, Palmerston North, in October 1998. During the year he also appeared in The Herbal Bed and The Farm at Dunedin's Fortune Theatre. He finished the year taking on the role of Swannee in Centrepoint's Christmas production of Shop 'Til You Drop.

In 1999, Murray landed the role of Dr Alan Dubrovsky in the New Zealand prime-time soap opera Shortland Street. In November 2000 it was announced that Murray's character was one of five being axed by the show's executive producer, Tony Holden, early in 2001.

After leaving Shortland Street, Murray appeared as the barman in the mixed media play Death of a Theatre Manager, as part of the 2001 TV2 International LAUGH! Festival. He then made his debut at Christchurch's Court Theatre in June 2001 playing a doctor in the Pulitzer Prize-winning one-act play W;t by Margaret Edson, alongside Helen Moulder, before appearing in the role of New Zealand Battle of Britain fighter ace Brian Carbury in The Face Maker, also at the Court. Later in 2001, he appeared as Peter in Roger Hall's play A Way of Life with the New Zealand Actors Company, touring various venues in the North Island including Hamilton, Tauranga, Rotorua, Auckland, Napier, Gisborne, New Plymouth and Wellington.

2002 saw Murray again appearing in The Face Maker, this time at the Circa in Wellington. In 2003 he played Pushy in Strata and the following year appeared in the New Zealand premiere of Gagarin Way by Scottish playwright Gregory Burke, both at BATS in Wellington. Also in 2004 he was back in Dunedin, acting in The Pied Piper at the Fortune and Don't Tell at the University of Otago, before returning to BATS to play Rudolf Hess in David Edgar's Albert Speer.

He took on the role of the title character Antonio in Centrepoint's 2005 production of The Merchant of Venice. Later that year he played Dimitri Tsafendas in Antony Sher's 2003 play I.D. at BATS, and subsequently won Actor of the Year for the role at the 2005 Chapman Tripp Theatre Awards.

In 2006 Murray appeared as Alex in the premiere season of Ken Duncum's play Picture Perfect. At the 2006 Chapman Tripp Theatre Awards he was awarded an accolade for outstanding performance for his role in Martin Crimp's The Country at Circa and also received a nomination for Actor of the Year for the same role.

Murray returned for the 10th anniversary production of The Farm at Centrepoint in 2007, but this time took on the role of farmer Jim Greene. He then took the role of the Earl of Kent in the 2007 Fortune Theatre production of King Lear, which also played at Te Whaea Theatre in Wellington. In 2007 he appeared in an episode of the New Zealand television drama The Hothouse.

In 2008 he appeared as Ben Hecht in Ron Hutchinson's Moonlight and Magnolias and a horse in the Polly Teale/Shared Experience version of Jane Eyre, both at the Fortune, as well as in Peter Hawes' The Gods of Warm Beer at Centrepoint.
