= Susan Wilson (director) =

New Zealand actor and director

Susan Wilson ONZM
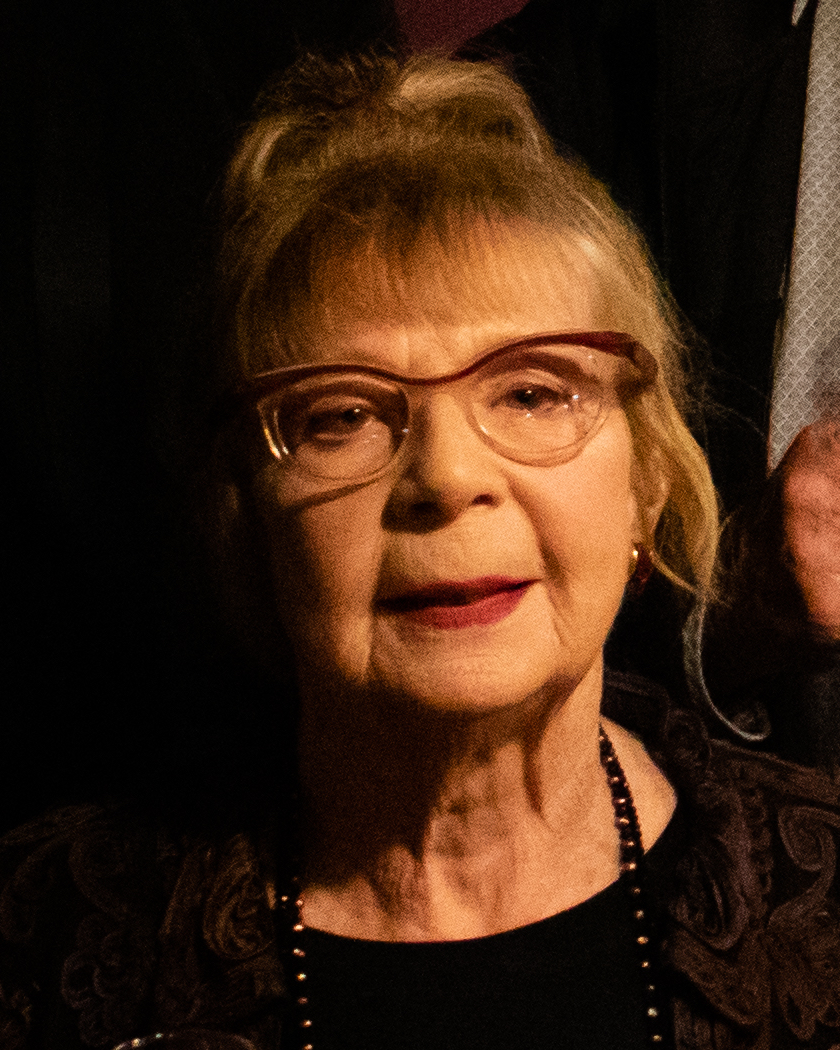
- Wilson in 2021
- Occupations: Actor and director
- Known for: role of Beryl in Gliding On series

Susan Accushla Wilson ONZM is a New Zealand director and actor. Wilson was one of the founders of Wellington's Circa Theatre and the Circa Council in 1976 and has had a long career at the theatre as a stage actor and director.

== Acting ==
Wilson played the role of Beryl in the popular television programme Gliding On over 5 series between 1981 and 1985. Her work in television also includes roles in Mortimer's Patch, and Close to Home. She also appeared as Aunt Daisy in an episode of Pioneer Women.

== Director ==
Wilson's productions include many winners of Chapman Tripp Theatre Awards including Angels in America, Joyful and Triumphant, Arcadia, and Death of a Salesman.

She has been a script advisor for Playmarket and Television New Zealand script editor.

As of 2021, Wilson continues as a Director at Circa Theatre. Wilson has been directing pantomimes at Circa Theatre over years, a recent was Cinderella (2020) written by Simon Leary & Gavin Rutherford.

== Honours and awards ==
In 1982, Wilson won Best Actress in the Feltex Television Awards, for Mortimer's Patch and Gliding On.

In 1992, Wilson won the Best Director award at the Chapman Tripp Theatre Awards for her direction of Robert Lord's Joyful and Triumphant. She won the same award again in 1994 for her production of Angels in America.

In 2006, Wilson won Director of the Year in the Chapman Tripp Theatre Awards for Death of a Salesman.

In the 2001 Queen’s Birthday Honours, Wilson was appointed an Officer of the New Zealand Order of Merit, for services to theatre.
