= Malcolm Murray =

Malcolm Murray may refer to:

- Malcolm Murray (actor) (born 1964), New Zealand actor
- Malcolm Murray (Swedish Army officer) (1904–1995), Swedish Army lieutenant general
- Malcolm Murray, 12th Earl of Dunmore (born 1946), Australia-based Scottish peer
- Malcolm Murray (footballer) (born 1964), Scottish footballer
- Malcolm Donald Murray (1867–1938), British Army officer and courtier
- Sir Malcolm Murray-MacGregor, 4th Baronet (1834–1879) of the MacGregor baronets
- Malcolm Murray (businessman) (born 1956), former chairman of Rangers FC
- Malcolm Murray, a character in the TV series Penny Dreadful
- Malcolm Patrick Murray (1905–1979), known as Pat or Patrick Murray, British civil servant
