= Elizabeth Whiting =

New Zealand costume designer

Elizabeth Whiting MNZM
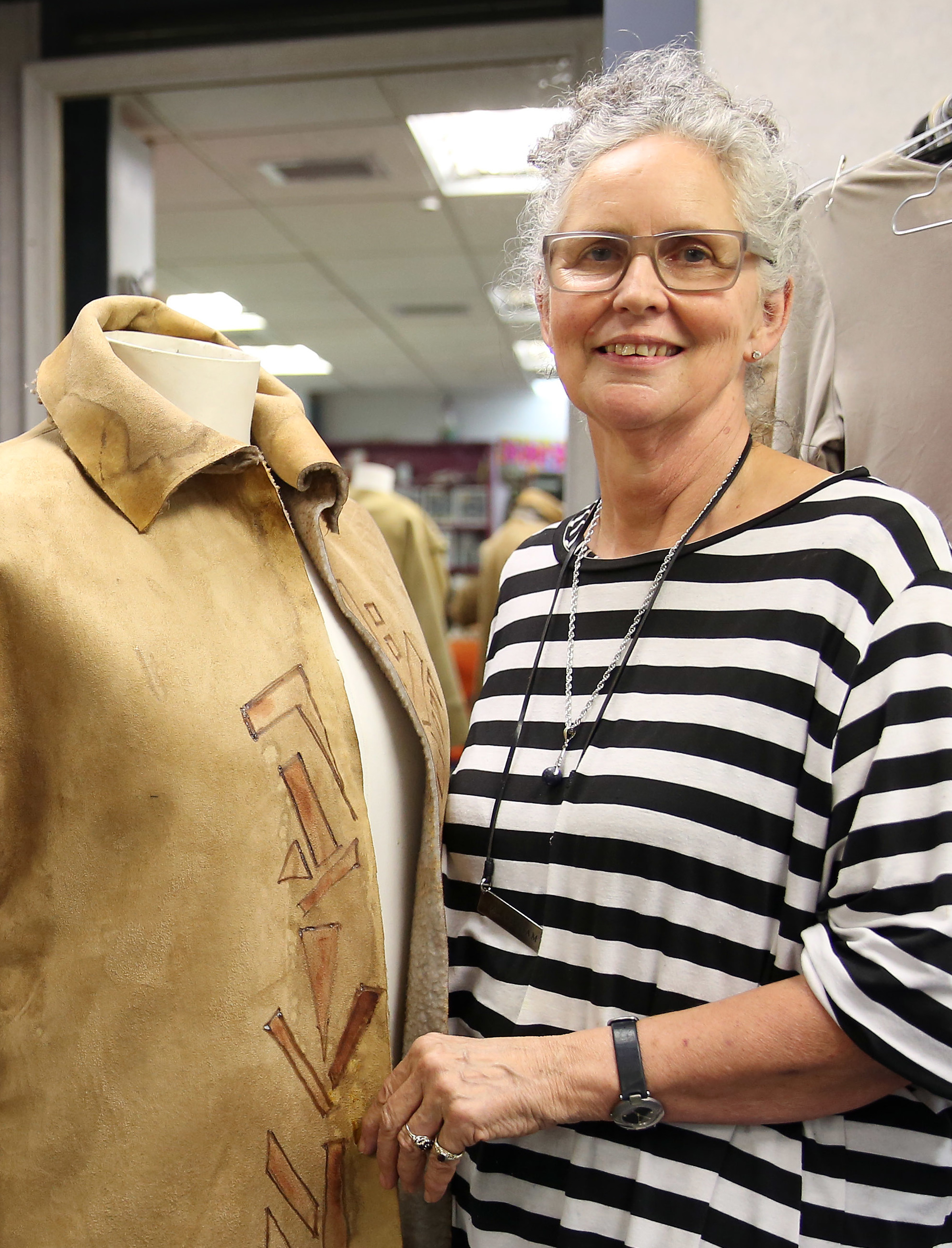
- Whiting at a rehearsal for NZ Opera's 2016 production The Magic Flute
- Born: Wellington, New Zealand
- Occupation: Costume designer
- Years active: Late 1970s – current
- Notable work: Chapman Tripp Theatre Award (2010) Costume Design – The Arrival, Red Leap Theatre

Elizabeth Robyn Whiting MNZM is a New Zealand stage costume designer. She won the 2010 Chapman Tripp Theatre Award Costume Design Award at Red Leap Theatre.

== Career ==
Whiting trained under designer Eve Schlup at Auckland's Theatre Corporate. Her first costume designs were for Limbs Dance Company (late 1970s to mid-1980s) and she has costumed New Zealand Opera since 1995.

Whiting has designed costumes for Auckland Theatre Company, Silo Theatre, Black Grace, Royal New Zealand Ballet, Pop-Up Theatre London for the Edinburgh Festival Fringe and six years of World of Wearable Art. Theatre shows Whiting has worked on include Into the Woods by Stephen Sondheim and directed by Raymond Hawthorne at the Sky City Theatre, Auckland (2000), My Name is Gary Cooper by Victor Rodger at the Maidment Theatre, Auckland, (2007) and Angels in America by Tony Kushner and directed by Shane Bosher at Q Theatre, Auckland (2014).

In 2018 Whiting designed costumes for La bohème (New Zealand Opera), The Cherry Orchard and Shortland Street – The Musical (Auckland Theatre Company) and Here Lies Love (Silo Theatre).

In 2019 Whiting designed costumes for Delicious Oblivion (Auckland Live Cabaret Season), Joan and The Daylight Atheist (Auckland Theatre Company), and The Fibonacci, choreographed by Victoria Columbus for The New Zealand Dance Company).

Of costume design Whiting says:

A good costume clarifies the nature of the play and helps tell the story underlining the themes, setting, social status of the characters and particular quirks they may have concerning their clothing.

== Awards and recognition ==
Whiting won the 2010 Chapman Tripp Theatre Award Costume Design Award (for The Arrival, at Red Leap Theatre) and represented New Zealand at the Prague Quadrennial of Performance Design and Space in 2003 and 2007. In 2021 Whiting won an inaugural Out of the Limelight Theatre Award, from the Sir Roger Hall Theatre Fund and managed by the Arts Foundation of New Zealand.

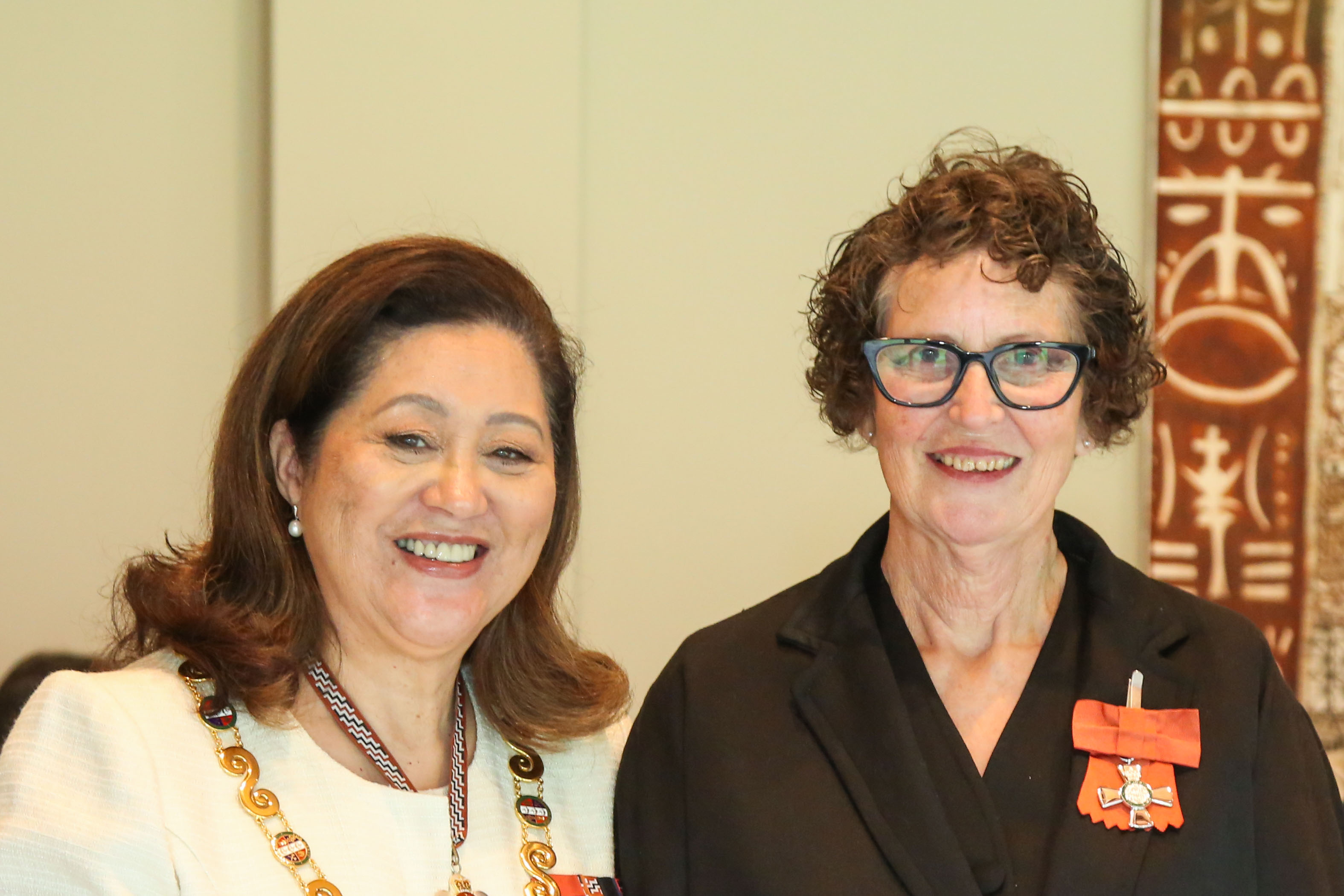
Whiting (right), after her investiture as a Member of the New Zealand Order of Merit by the governor-general, Dame Cindy Kiro, at Government House, Auckland, on 11 April 2026

In the 2026 New Year Honours, Whiting was appointed a Member of the New Zealand Order of Merit, for services to costume design.
