= Gary Henderson (playwright) =

New Zealand playwright, director and teacher

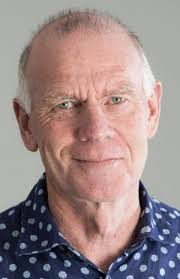
Portrait of New Zealand Playwright, Gary Henderson

Gary Henderson (born 1955) is a New Zealand playwright, director and teacher. Henderson's work has been produced both nationally and internationally, with his play Skin Tight having travelled to Edinburgh, New York City and Canada. Whilst at the 1998 Edinburgh Fringe Festival it won the Fringe First Award. In 2013 Henderson received a $20,000 Playmarket Award, acknowledging his contribution to New Zealand theatre.

== Personal life ==
Henderson was born in Geraldine in South Canterbury. He lives in Auckland.

== Plays ==
- Things That Matter (Auckland Theatre Company 2023)
- Shepherd (The Court Theatre 2015)
- My Bed My Universe (Massive Company, 2014)
- Stealing Games (Capital E 2009)
- Sun Shower (in Mother Whaea Tama Son) (Musgrove Studio 2009)
- The Good One (in Mother Whaea Tama Son) (Musgrove Studio 2009)
- Lines of Fire
- Peninsula (Court Theatre 2005)
- Home Land (commissioned by the Fortune Theatre, 2004), about an ageing Otago farmer who has to leave his farm due to failing health.
- Without Trace
- An Unseasonable Fall of Snow (Downstage Theatre, 1998)
- Mo and Jess Kill Susie (BATS Theatre 1996)
- Spine-Tingle
- The Judas Zoo (with Christian Penny and Anna Marbrook) (Theatre at Large 1995)
- Tigerplay (BATS Theatre 1994)
- Skin Tight (BATS Theatre 1994)
- Sunset Cafe (BATS Theatre 1993)
- The Big Blue Planet Earth Show (with Emma Robinson, Shane Bartle, Toni Gordon and Tina Cook) (BATS Theatre 1991)
- Alien Kiss (Circa Theatre 1990)
- The Song of Bobby Zack (BATS Theatre 1989))
- Zippy and Gonk Meet the Hooded Mangler
- Ziggy's Tribe (Parkway Intermediate School, 1987))
- Monsters
