= Meggan Rollandi =

New Zealand artist, performance designer and academic

Meggan Rollandi is a New Zealand artist, performance designer and academic. She is a lecturer in spatial design at Massey University.

== Biography ==
Rollandi completed a bachelor of performance design at Massey University in 2007, and a master's degree in design at Massey in 2010.

In 2014, she received the Weta Workshop Award for Set Designer of the Year at the Chapman Tripp Theatre Awards for her work on WATCH. In 2016, Rollandi was nominated for best set designer in the Wellington Theatre Awards. In 2020, she won an Auckland Theatre Award for excellence in production.
