= Mortimer's Patch =

Television series

Mortimer's Patch is a TVNZ police drama from the early 1980s. It depicted detective and police work in the fictional town of Cobham. It was filmed in and around Helensville, New Zealand..The series was New Zealand's first police drama, and it topped the ratings. There was a total of three seasons.

== Cast ==
=== Main ===
- Terence Cooper as Det Sgt Doug Mortimer
- Sean Duffy as Const Dave Gilchrist
- Don Selwyn as Sgt Bob Storey

=== Recurring ===
- Bruce Allpress as Sparkey
- Martyn Sanderson as Major Stark
- Judy McIntosh as Constable Lois Higgs

=== Guests ===
- Jim Hickey as Mechanic
- Ken Blackburn as Detective Inspector Chris Knight
- Marshall Napier as Lance Harris
- Peter Cummins as Johnny Morgan
- Roy Billing as Ron Bailey
- Temuera Morrison as Alamein
