= Gliding On =

- Genre: Sitcom
- Written by: Roger Hall
- Directed by: Tony Holden
- Starring: Michael Haigh; Susan Wilson; Ross Jolly; Ray Henwood; Grant Tilly; Ken Blackburn; Katy Platt; Roy Billing
- Opening theme: "Good Old Desk" by Harry Nilsson
- Country of origin: New Zealand
- Original language: English
- No. of seasons: 5
- No. of episodes: 32

Production
- Producer: Tony Holden
- Editor: Sue Malcolmson
- Running time: 30 minutes
- Production company: Television New Zealand

Original release
- Network: Television One
- Release: 31 August 1981 – 1985

Gliding On is a New Zealand sitcom that aired from 1981 to 1985.

It was written by Roger Hall and adapted from his play Glide Time, and directed by Tony Holden. The series depicts the working lives of four staff members at a government supply office in the early 1980s.

The series was followed by a short-lived sequel, Market Forces, set in the "restructured" public service environment of New Zealand's post-Rogernomics era.

Over the course of its run, Gliding On won multiple awards including Best Comedy, Best Drama and Best Direction at the Feltex Awards.

== Cast ==
- Michael Haigh as Jim
- Susan Wilson as Beryl
- Ross Jolly as John
- Ray Henwood as Hugh
- Grant Tilly as Wally
- Ken Blackburn as The Boss
- Katy Platt as Raewyn
- Roy Billing as Perce

Several other New Zealand actors appeared in different episodes, including Jeffrey Thomas
