= Albert Speer (play) =

2000 play by David Edgar

Albert Speer was a 2000 play by the British playwright David Edgar on the life of the Nazi architect Albert Speer, based on the book Albert Speer: His Battle with Truth by Gitta Sereny. It premiered that year at the Lyttelton auditorium of the Royal National Theatre, with the title role played by Alex Jennings and the role of Hitler played by Roger Allam. The play was directed by Trevor Nunn.
