= Wellington Opera House =

Proscenium theatre venue in Wellington, New Zealand

The Opera House
- Previously: State Opera House, The Grand Opera House
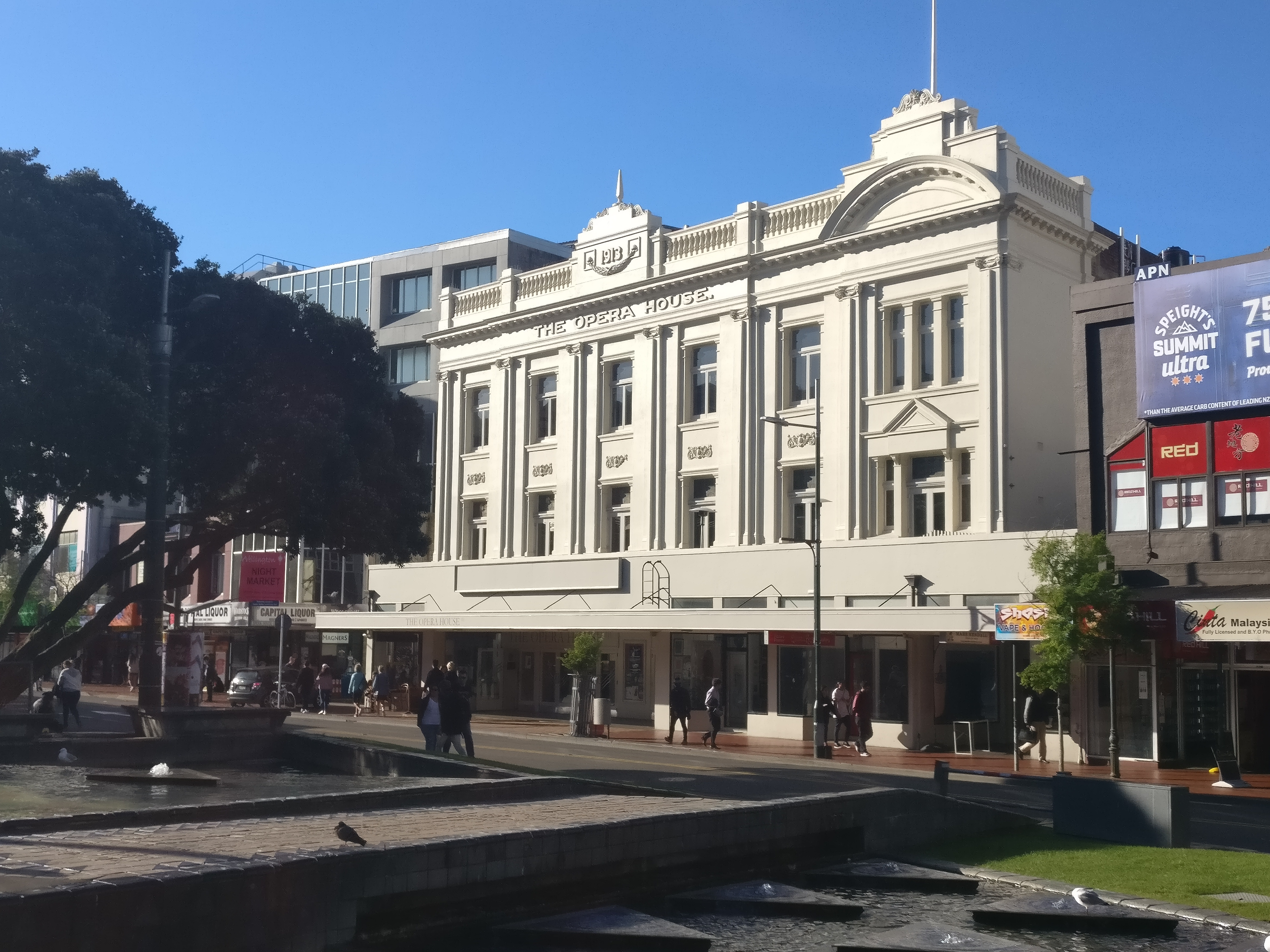
- The Opera House on Manners Street, Wellington
- Interactive map of The Opera House
- Address: 111–113 Manners Street; Wellington; New Zealand
- Coordinates: 41.2915°S 174.7778°E
- Capacity: 1,381
- Type: Opera House
- Designation: NZHPT classification I

Construction
- Opened: 1914
- Architect: William Pitt

Website
- Venues Wellington: The Opera House

Heritage New Zealand – Category 1
- Designated: 27 June 1985
- Reference no.: 1432

The Wellington Opera House is a proscenium theatre in Wellington, New Zealand, located on Manners Street opposite Te Aro Park.

== History ==
The present Opera House replaced earlier buildings on Manners Street. The Imperial Opera House opened in 1878, but burnt down a year later.

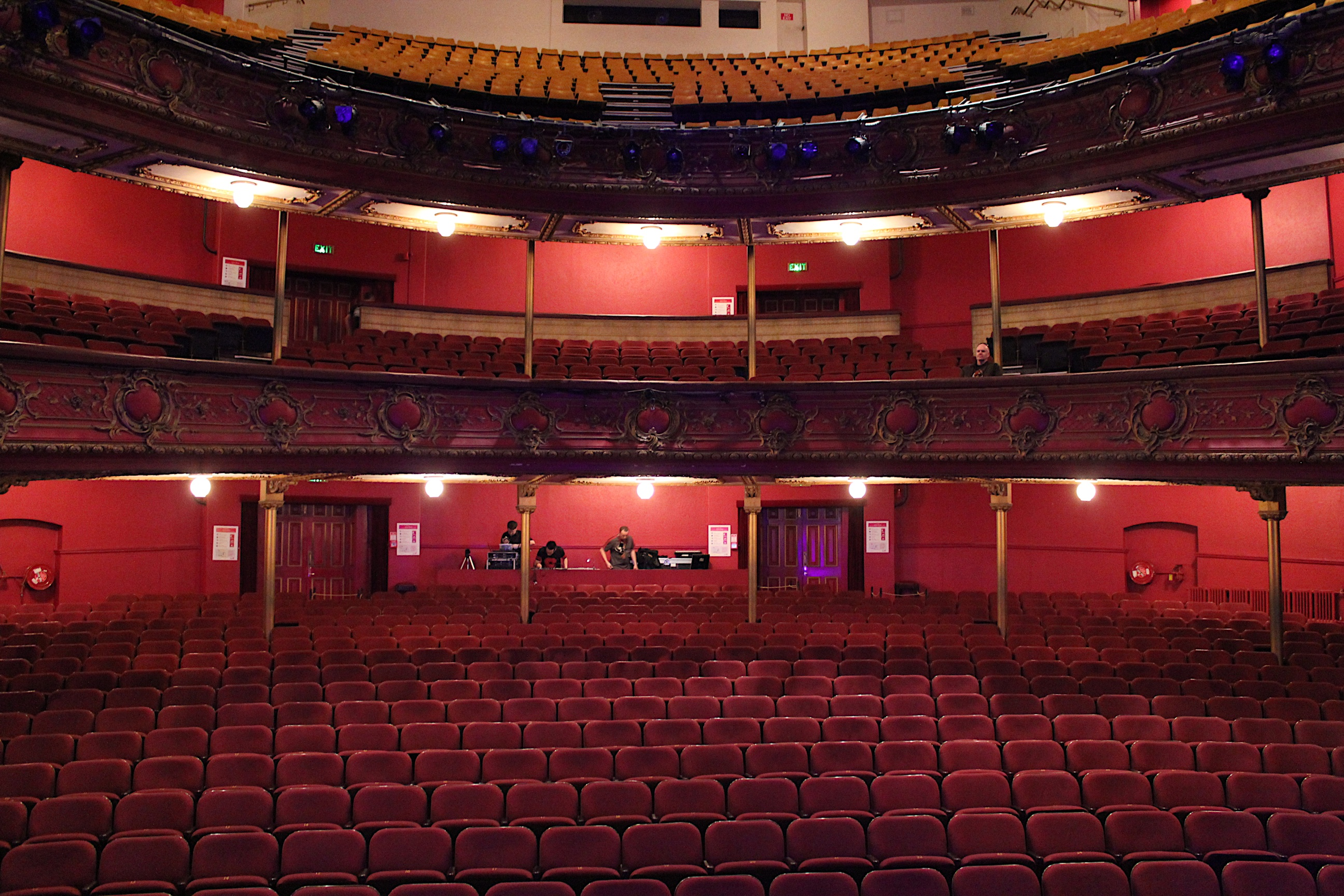
Interior of the Opera House

Construction work on the present building began in 1911. It was named The Grand Opera House in May 1913 with a plan to open early on Boxing Night that year. The principal architect William Pitt was based in Melbourne, Australia, and much of the work was overseen by Wellington architect Albert Liddy. The opera house finally opened on Easter Saturday of 12 April 1914 to an evening performance by the American Burlesque Company, with a full seating capacity of 2141 in three levels of stalls, dress circle and gallery, including 50 box seats. The original seating upholstery was made and installed by the Wellington company Kirkcaldie & Stains, and the interior features fine plaster mouldings and an ornate dome. The building was designed with brick masonry outer walls with wooden floors and a timber-framed roof. It is registered by Heritage New Zealand as a Category 1 Historic Place.

A photo hanging in the dress circle foyer alcove is of Phyllis Porter a dancer in the J.C. Williamson Peep Show Company in 1923 who died in Wellington Hospital after her costume caught fire.

In 1977 it was restored with funding from the New Zealand insurance company State Insurance, and for many years it was known as the State Opera House.

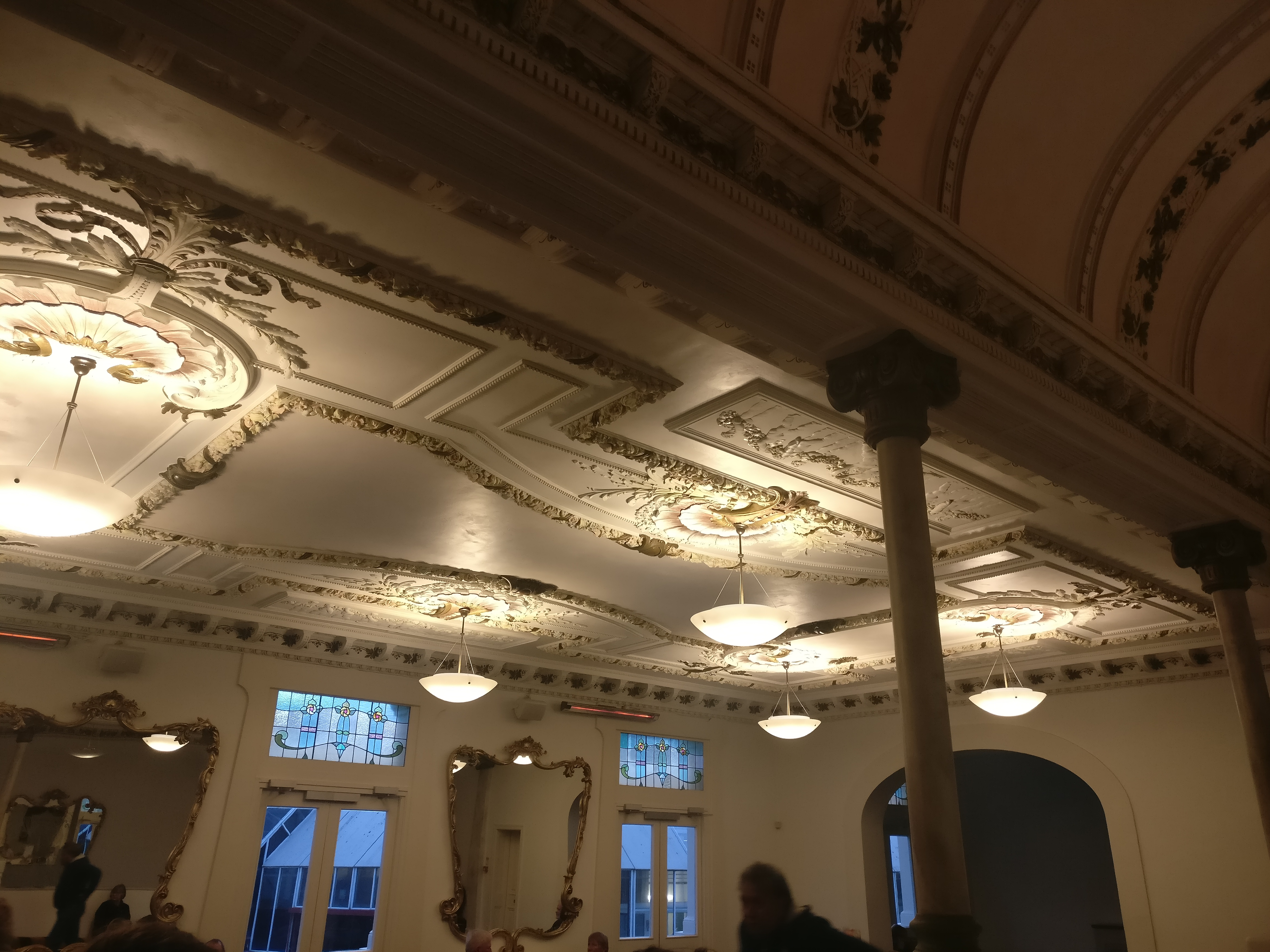
The original interior plasterwork in the upper foyer, restored in 2016.

In the 1990s and early 2000s the building was operated by the St James Theatre Trust, which ran the nearby St James Theatre. In July 2011 Positively Wellington Venues, an integration between the Wellington Convention Centre and the St James Theatre Trust, began managing the theatre under the new name of The Opera House along with five other venues in the capital city. In October 2012 it was announced that the Opera House was an earthquake risk and would possibly have to close. By the end of 2016, funding from Wellington City Council and the Performing Arts Foundation of Wellington enabled the building to be strengthened and restored to sufficient code to continue to be open to the public. The refit also included an award-winning restoration of its original interior features, by a local architect and 14 painters and artists.

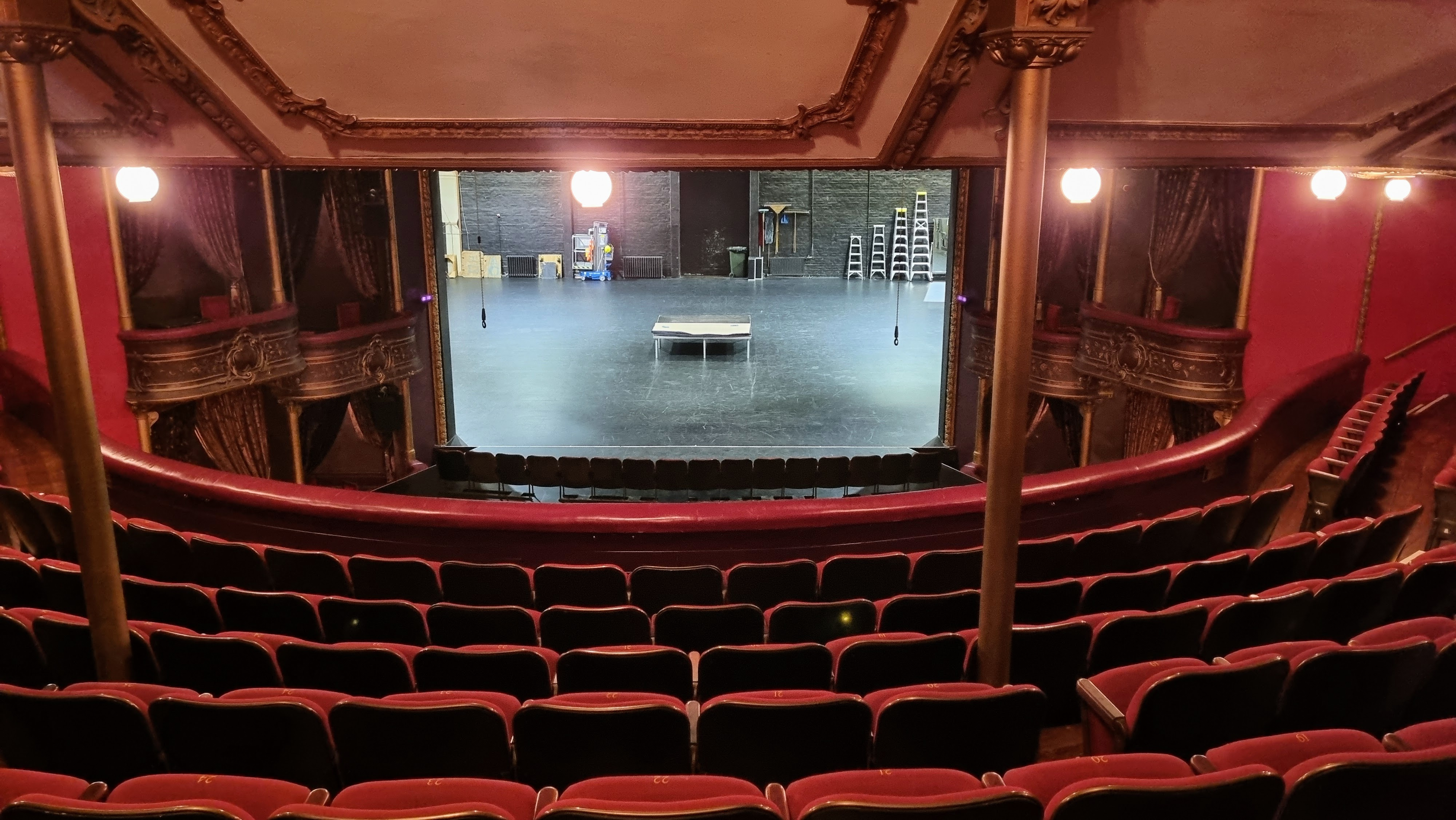
View from the dress circle towards the stage

The Opera House was used for the theatre scenes in Peter Jackson's 2005 film King Kong.
