= Circa Theatre =

Wellington theatre company

Coordinates: 41.29041°S 174.78048°E

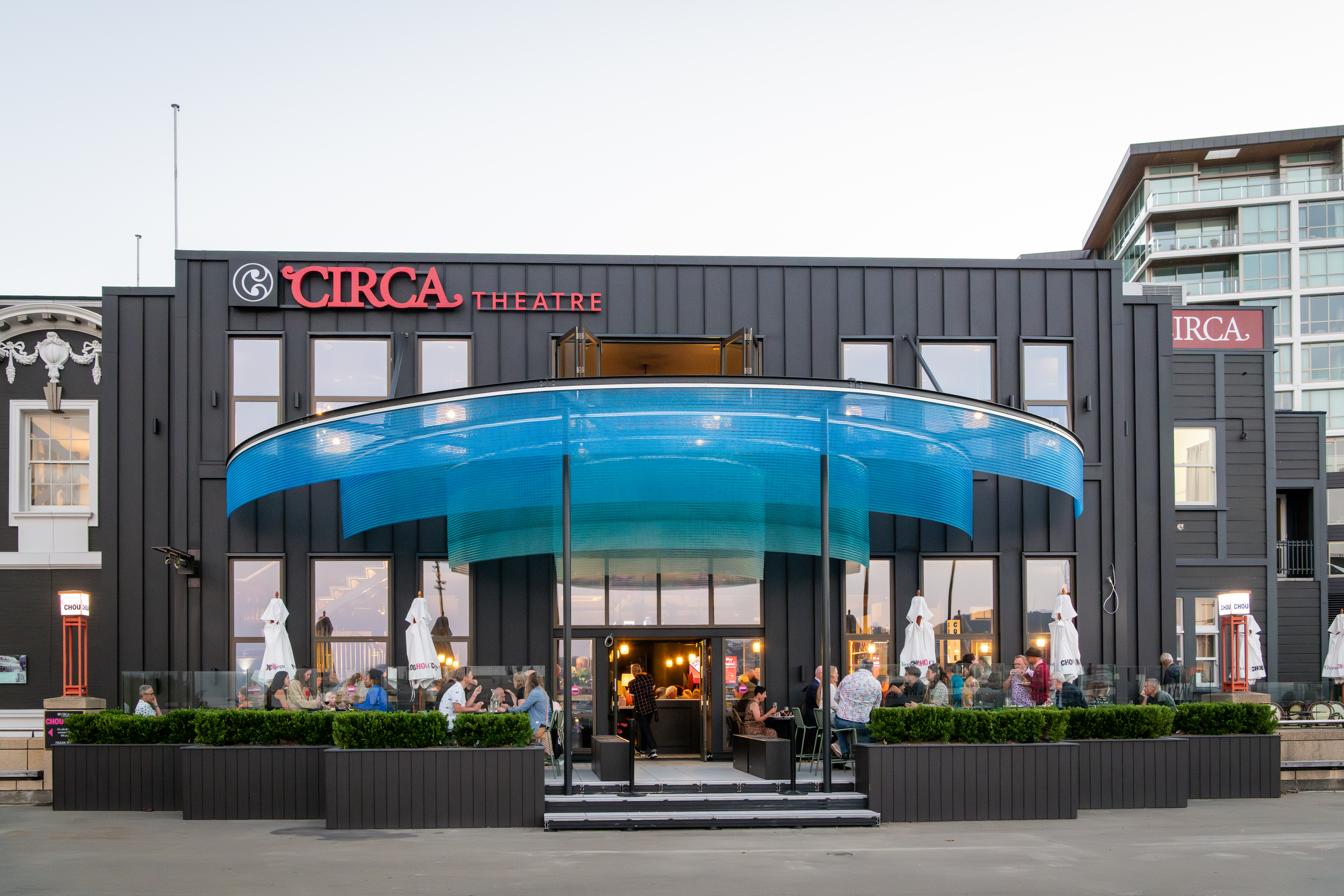
- Formation: 1976
- Type: Theatre group
- Purpose: Presenting theatre plays
- Location: Wellington New Zealand
- Artistic director: Circa Council
- Website: www.circa.co.nz

Circa Theatre is a professional theatre company in Wellington, New Zealand, that was established in 1976. They present a number of plays each year in their two auditoriums, and have a unique partnership and funding model with incoming shows underpinned with a cooperative principle.

== Background ==
Circa Theatre was formed in 1976 by a group of actors who were reacting against what they saw as an administration-heavy professional theatre scene in New Zealand. Many of this group had come through Unity Theatre, the New Theatre and Downstage Theatre in Wellington. Circa Theatre was part of a wave of professional theatre companies in New Zealand that started with Downstage Theatre in 1964, and was followed by the Mercury Theatre, Auckland (1968), Four Seasons, Whanganui (1970), The Court Theatre, Christchurch (1971), Gateway Theatre, Tauranga (1972), Fortune, Dunedin (1973), Theatre Corporate, Auckland (1973) and Centrepoint Theatre, Palmerston North (1974).

The founding Circa Theatre group wanted to keep costs low and focus on quality scripts and performances. They developed a cooperative model of presenting plays and all invested their time in setting up a venue. The founding members were Ray Henwood, Carolyn Henwood, Grant Tilly, Fay Tilly, George Webby, Susan Wilson, Ross Jolly, Anne Flannery, Ian McClymont, Marilyn Head, Michael Haigh, Stuart Devenie, Gwen Kaiser, Jean Betts and Tony Lane.

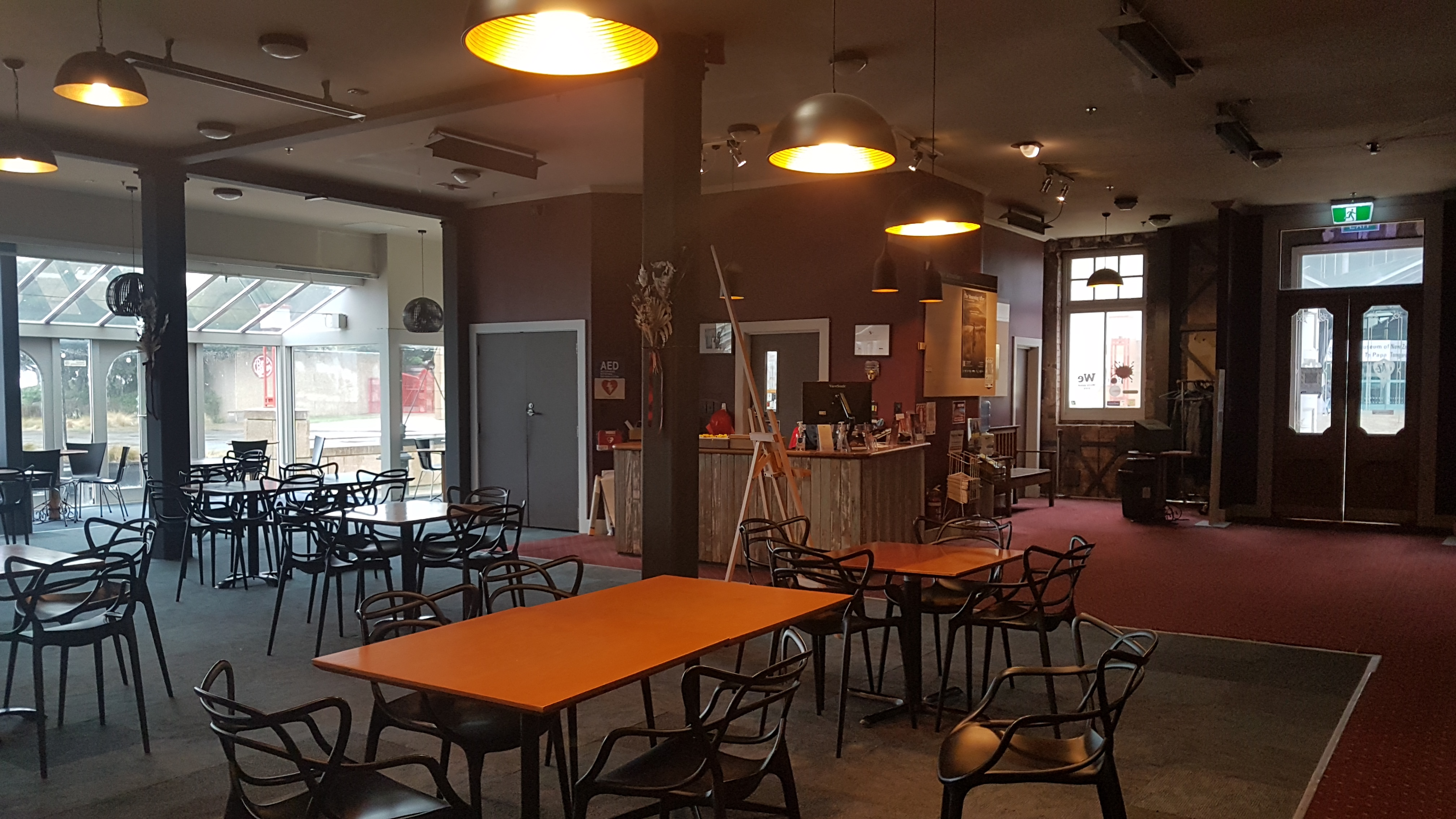
Circa Theatre foyer (2021)

In 1996 Circa Theatre published a book compiling a twenty-year history that summarises the plays and people involved from each years programme. The Circa Council at that time were Neville Carson, Rhona Carson, Peter Hambleton, Ray Henwood, Carolyn Henwood, Ruth Jeffery, Ross Jolly, Katherine McRae, Ian Nicholls, Bruce Phillips, John Reid, Grant Tilly, Jane Waddell, Linda Wilson and Susan Wilson. Grant Tilly wrote in the Circa Theatre twenty year anniversary book,

"Circa remains above all an actors theatre, a theatre whose heart is the play in performance.

== Current ==
Now larger in scale than in the 1970s Circa Theatre still operates with the same principles that it started with and is an incorporated society governed by Circa Council. On an annual basis Circa Council programmes the year's events and presentations, and form a partnership with each of the companies that present work. The Circa Council programmes two venues, Circa One of approximately 250 seats and Circa Two of approximately 100 seats.

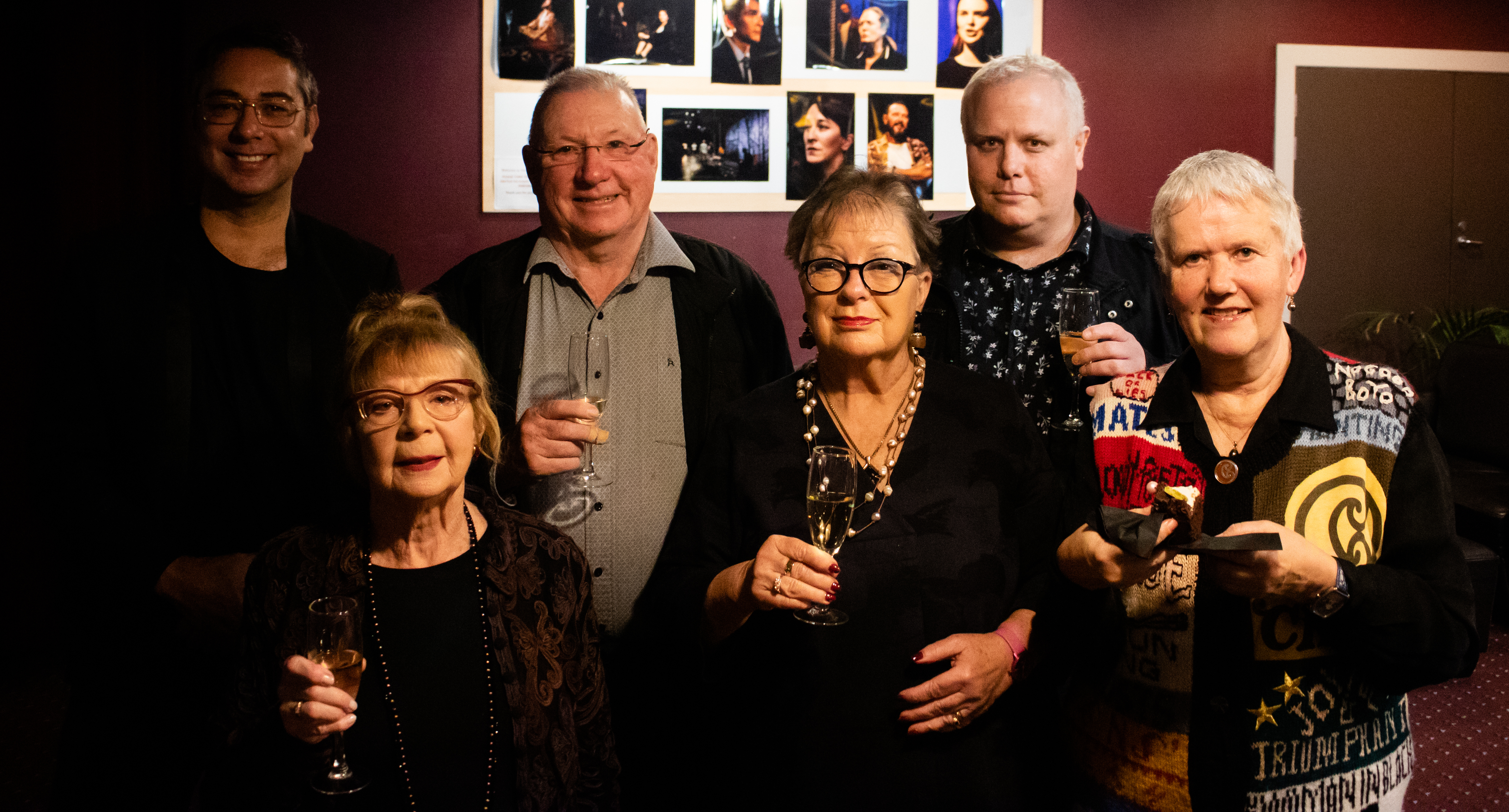
Circa Council 2021, from left - Salesi Le'ota, Susan Wilson, Neville Carson, Carolyn Henwood CNZM, Gavin Rutherford, and Linda Wilson

Circa Theatre has a standard four week run for shows with a week in between for production.

Support for Circa is received from Creative New Zealand, the Wellington City Council and other sponsors.

In 2025 the Circa Council consisted still of some original council members: Carolyn Henwood, Susan Wilson and Ross Jolly. Other council members are Debbie Fish, Jamie McCaskill, Carrie Green, Andrew Foster, Linda Wilson, Salesi Le’ota, Gavin Rutherford, Neville Carson (who joined the council in 1977) and Sepe Mua’au.

== Building ==
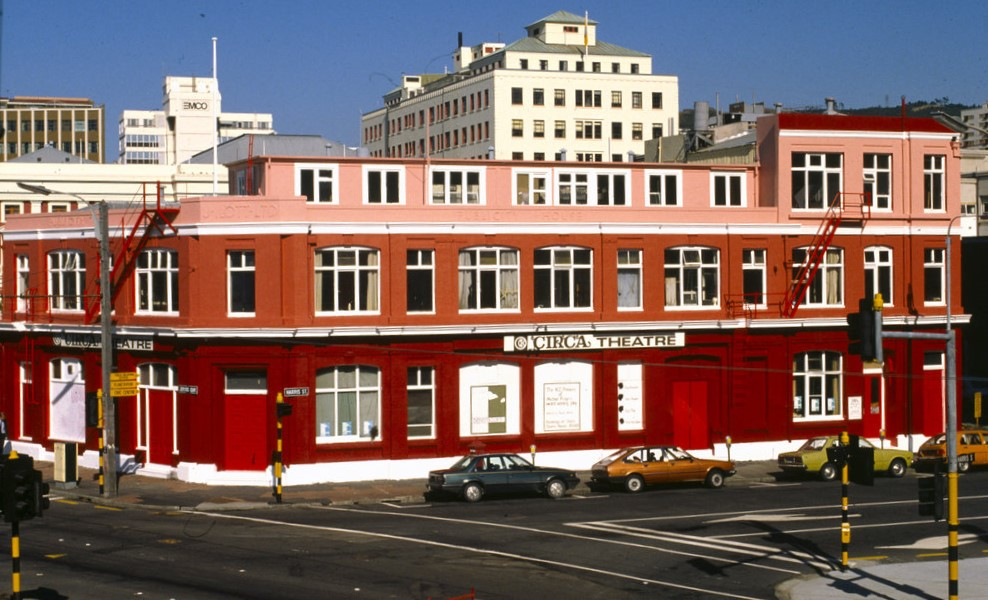
Circa Theatre on Harris Street

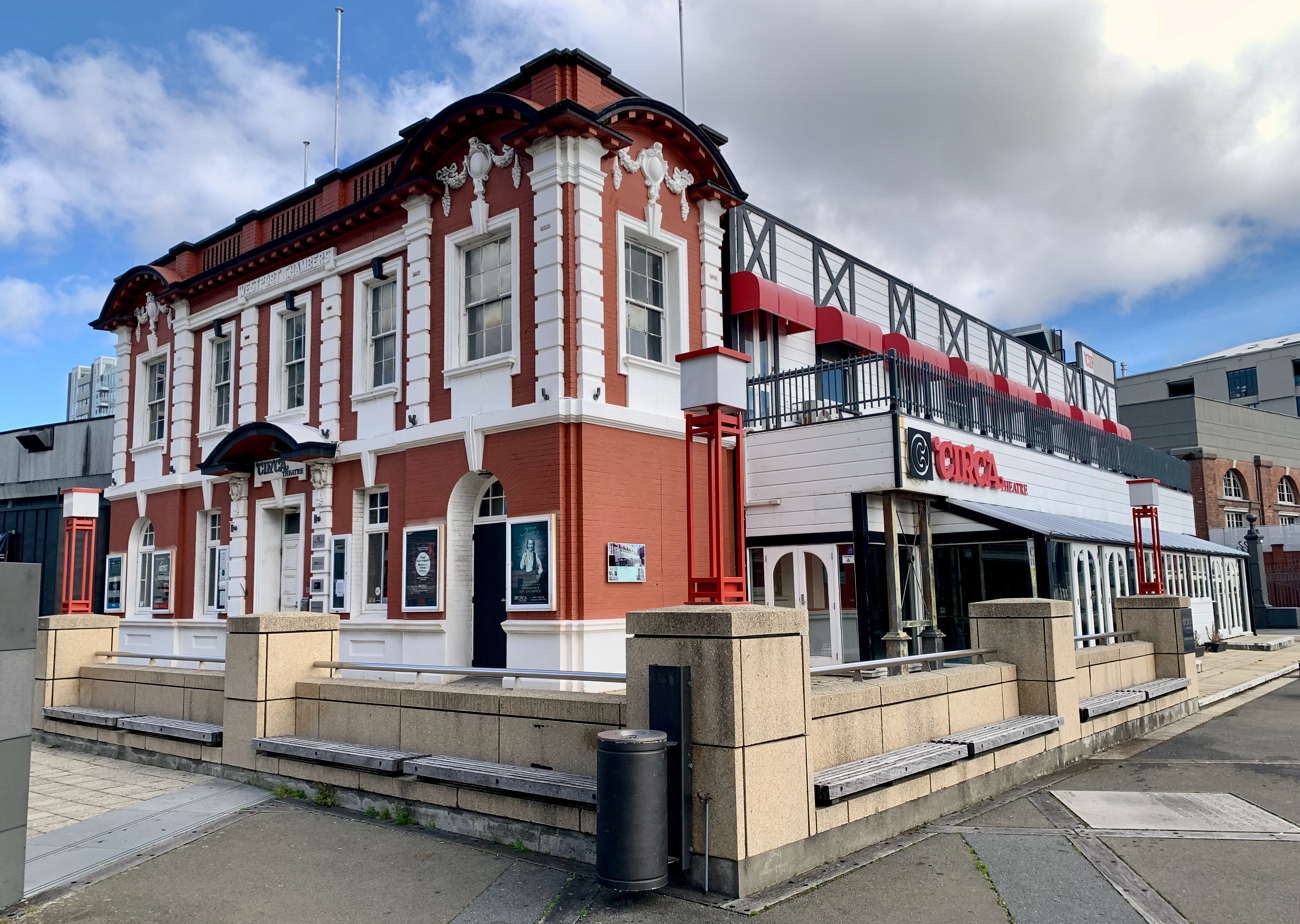
Circa Theatre building view from the waterfront before renovations in 2025

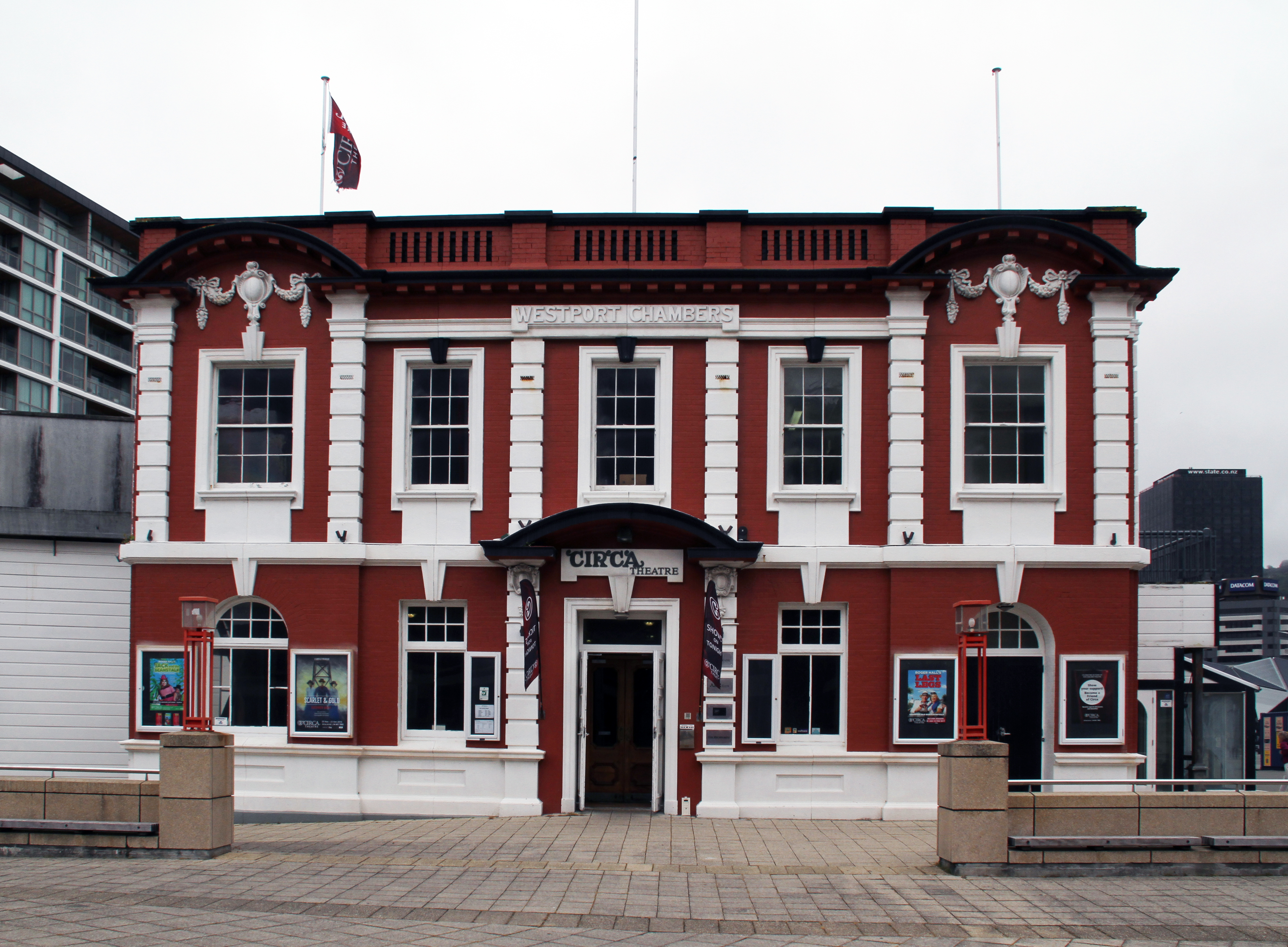
Front entrance of Circa Theatre showing the facade of the heritage Westport Coal building from 1916

=== Circa Theatre, Harris Street ===
In 1975 Circa Theatre Inc. took over the building on Harris Street in Wellington in a former advertising agency that was going to be demolished. Wellington City Council stayed the demolition to enable Circa to be there. The original Circa members renovated an area on the ground level to create a 100-seat auditorium, dressing rooms and storage on the first level and a rehearsal room on the top level.

=== Circa Theatre, 1 Taranaki Street ===
The current home of Circa Theatre is next to Te Papa Tongarewa, The National Museum of New Zealand in a prominent location on Wellington's waterfront. The Circa Theatre building was purpose-built and designed by Ampersand architects and theatre consultant Grant Tilly and opened in 1994. This is an architecturally interesting building in Wellington as the facade is from a heritage building, the former Westport Coal Company building (1916), which was moved onsite from across the road. The Westport Coal Company was once New Zealand's largest coal producer and supplier. The new Circa Theatre building did not receive positive reviews from the architectural community and it made the Wellington's top-ten ‘worst buildings’ list in a competition run by Wellington's Architecture Centre in 2007. Part of Grant Tilly's brief as theatre consultant was to keep the intimate nature of the theatre experience and having a flexible auditorium with movable seating; he designed an auditorium with a kite shape and movable sections of seating.

== Significant moments ==
The premiere presentation of Roger Hall's play Glide Time at Circa Theatre in 1976 became a huge hit, and transferred to the Opera House, Wellington. This play was formative for New Zealanders' acceptance of 'home-grown' theatre. At that time, most of the plays presented in New Zealand were by writers from America or the United Kingdom. Glide Time was turned into a successful television series renamed Gliding On, and starred some of the actors who had been in the Circa production.

The establishment of the Theatre Artists Charitable Trust (TACT) in 1987 was another significant moment. The trust has attracted donations from sponsors and funders over the years, and allocates grants to the theatre companies who are in partnership with Circa to create and present shows. Original and ongoing sponsors are law firm Chapman Tripp.

In 1994, a new purpose-built theatre building was opened at 1 Taranaki Street, Wellington. The opening production was Angels in America, written by Tony Kushner.

From time to time Circa Theatre supports other work with the venue used for festivals or events. In 1999, Circa hosted an international festival of women's performance produced by Magdalena Aotearoa. A symposium titled 'Staging the Future' was convened by the Theatre Artists' Charitable Trust (TACT) and hosted by Circa Theatre in 2003 and 2007. Between 2010 and 2016, Circa Theatre provided support and a venue for Tawata Productions Matariki Development Festival, an international indigenous playwrights festival. The Kia Mau Festival came from this playwrights festival and uses Circa Theatre as one of the venues.

In 2016 Circa Theatre celebrated 40 years, and published a companion book to the 20 years book.

Other significant moments include participation and support of New Zealand playwright workshops over the years, including in conjunction with Playmarket.
