= Toi Pōneke Arts Centre =

Creative production facility and support complex in New Zealand

Coordinates: 41°17′46″S 174°46′24″E

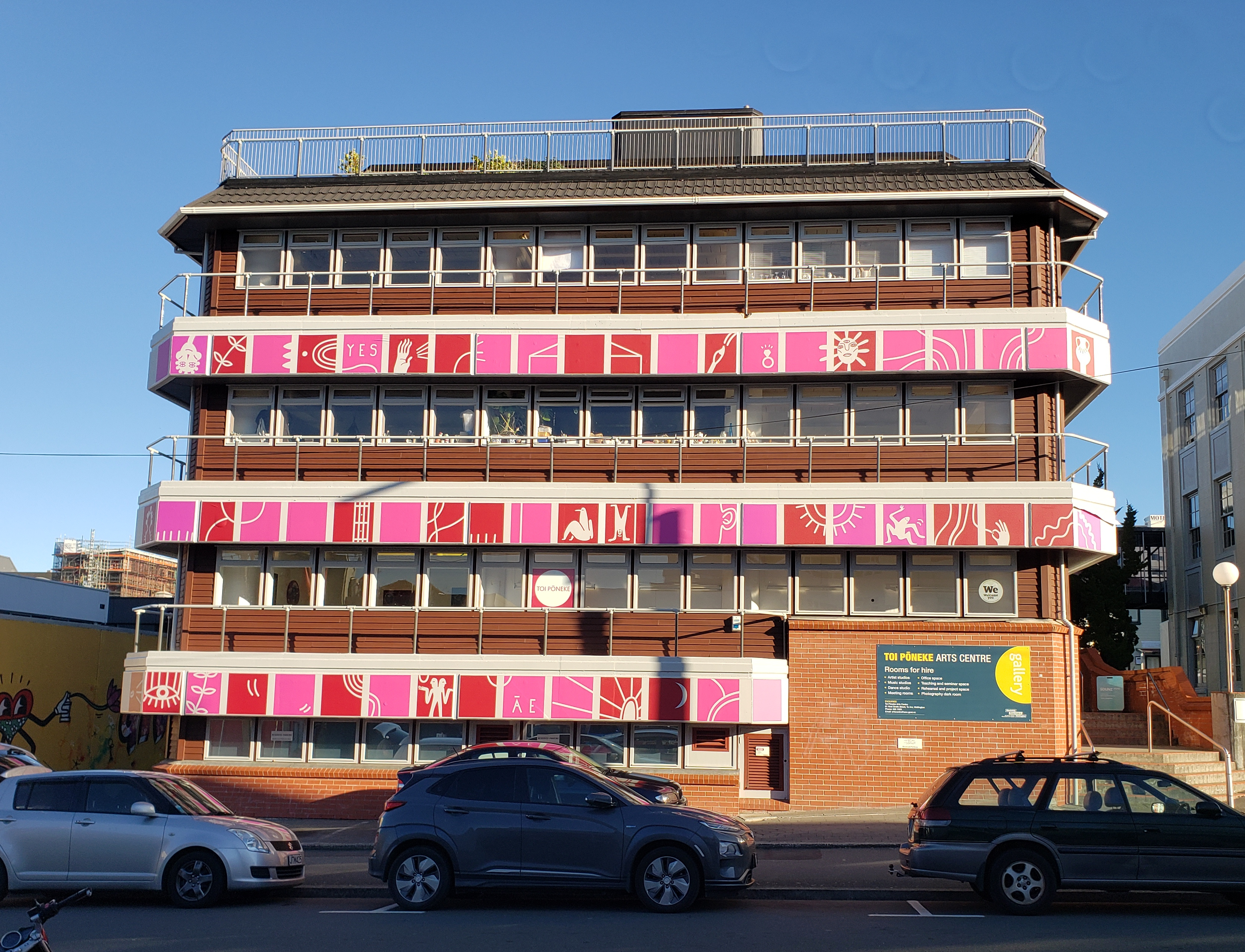
The arts centre in 2021

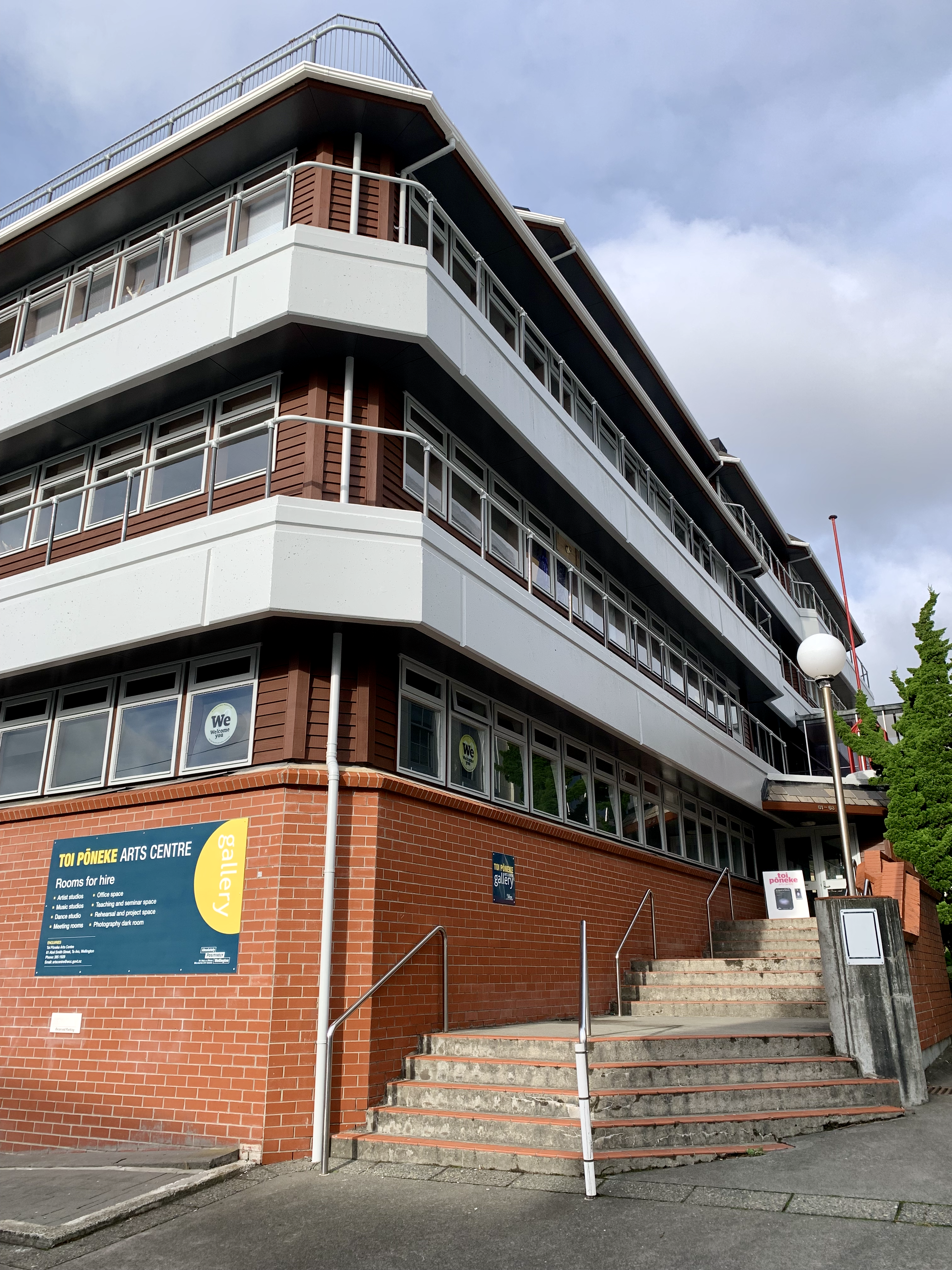
Toi Pōneke main entrance 2021

== Origin ==
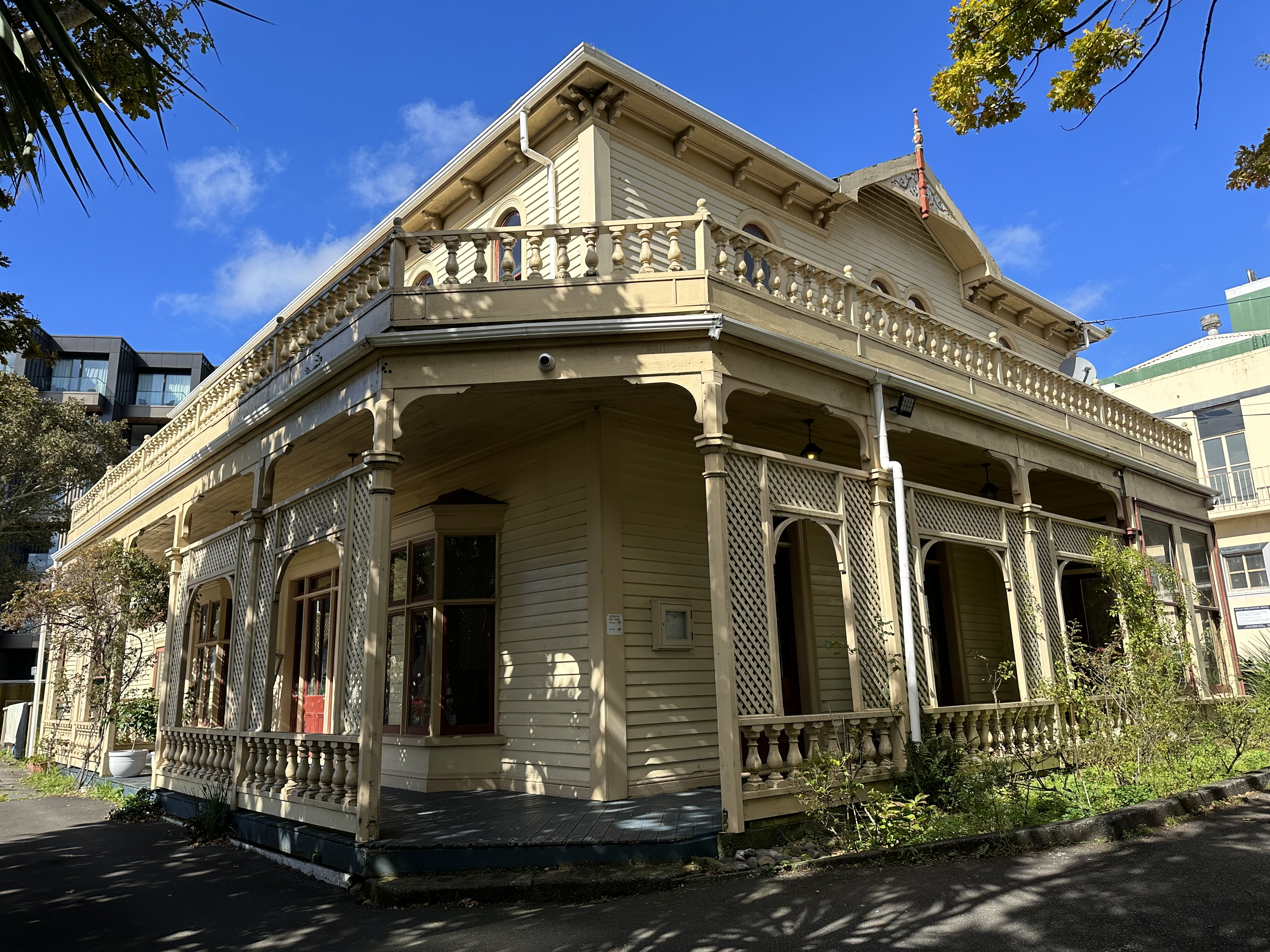
Wellington Art Centre (from 1979) Dransfield House 355 Willis Street the home of Summer City

The Wellington Arts Centre opened in Dransfield House, 355 Willis street in 1979. The building became the administrative and creative hub of the original "Summer '79" - renamed "Summer City" a programme of summer events which still continues. Rohesia Hamilton Metcalfe initiated the concept and many others have managed Summer City which repurposes under-utilised public spaces like parks and beaches, into performance venues.

The original scheme saw hundreds of artists, performers, support staff employed under the Temporary Employment Programme (TEP) then the Project Employment Programme (PEP) and was one of the largest employers of artists in the country's history. Graeme Nesbitt and Len Nightingale were employed to help expand the programme and organise events. Nesbitt added four People's Park Days, several rock concerts, and a programme of Gamelan music and dance. Local restaurants and other artists, including several Artists Co-op members, also contributed to Summer '79 and Summer City events.

Likely the largest event organised and run out of the Willis street venue was the Sun Festival, the idea of Joe Bleakley, held on the harbour with large, purpose built, floats attracting a 60,000 strong crowd at Oriental Bay it involved 3000 school children. Composer Jenny McLeod spent three months composing and rehearsing music for the event(1983) The entire Oriental Bay promenade was painted with murals in removable paint by local High Schools.

== 1991-2005 ==
From c. 1991 The Wellington Arts Centre was based at the Oriental Bay band Rotunda

== 2005-2026 ==
The Arts Centre was moved to 61–69 Abel Smith Street, Te Aro, Wellington, Here it became a production facility and support complex and it was formally opened by Mayor Kerry Prendergast in July 2005.

The Arts Centre housed a combination of 29 artist studios, rehearsal spaces, music rooms, and administrative offices. It was home to over a dozen producers, festivals, or arts organisations, including Cuba Street Carnival, the New Zealand Fringe Festival, Dance Aotearoa NZ, Sticky Pictures, Arts Access Aotearoa, and SOUNZ Centre for New Zealand Music. Other cultural concerns based at the facility included Wellington Photographic Society, Acoustic Routes, Empress Stiltdance, Shakespeare Globe Centre NZ, and Storytellers Cafe. There were c.40 visual artists working from the two floors of studio space, and the ground floor contained workshop space and a gallery which presented 15–20 exhibitions annually.

There was a small staff based at the facility, including the city's Arts Programmes & Services Manager, Eric Vaughn Holowacz

In July 2006, after its first year of operation, the Wellington Arts Centre was renamed Toi Pōneke, a Māori language phrase for "Art of Wellington". Toi Pōneke – Wellington Arts Centre is regularly used by artists, musicians, theatre people, instructors, and producers.

== 2026 ==
In May 2026, Wellington City Council announced that Toi Pōneke was moving to smaller premises in Cable Street and being renamed Toi Aro.
