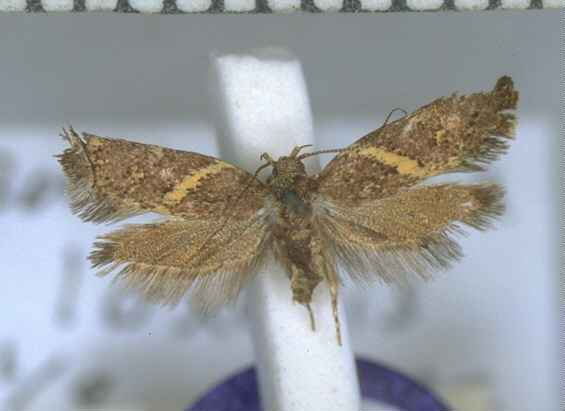
- Male lectotype

Conservation status
- Data Deficit (NZ TCS)

Scientific classification
- Kingdom: Animalia
- Phylum: Arthropoda
- Clade: Pancrustacea
- Class: Insecta
- Order: Lepidoptera
- Family: Oecophoridae
- Genus: Tingena
- Species: T. loxotis

Binomial name
- Tingena loxotis (Meyrick, 1905)

Synonyms
- Borkhausenia loxotis Meyrick, 1905

= Tingena loxotis =

Species of moth, endemic to New Zealand

Tingena loxotis is a species of moth in the family Oecophoridae. This species is endemic to New Zealand and is found in the North Island. This species is found in gardens and are known to enter houses. Adults are on the wing in December and January. In 2025 this species was classified as "data deficient" under the New Zealand Threat Classification System.

== Taxonomy ==
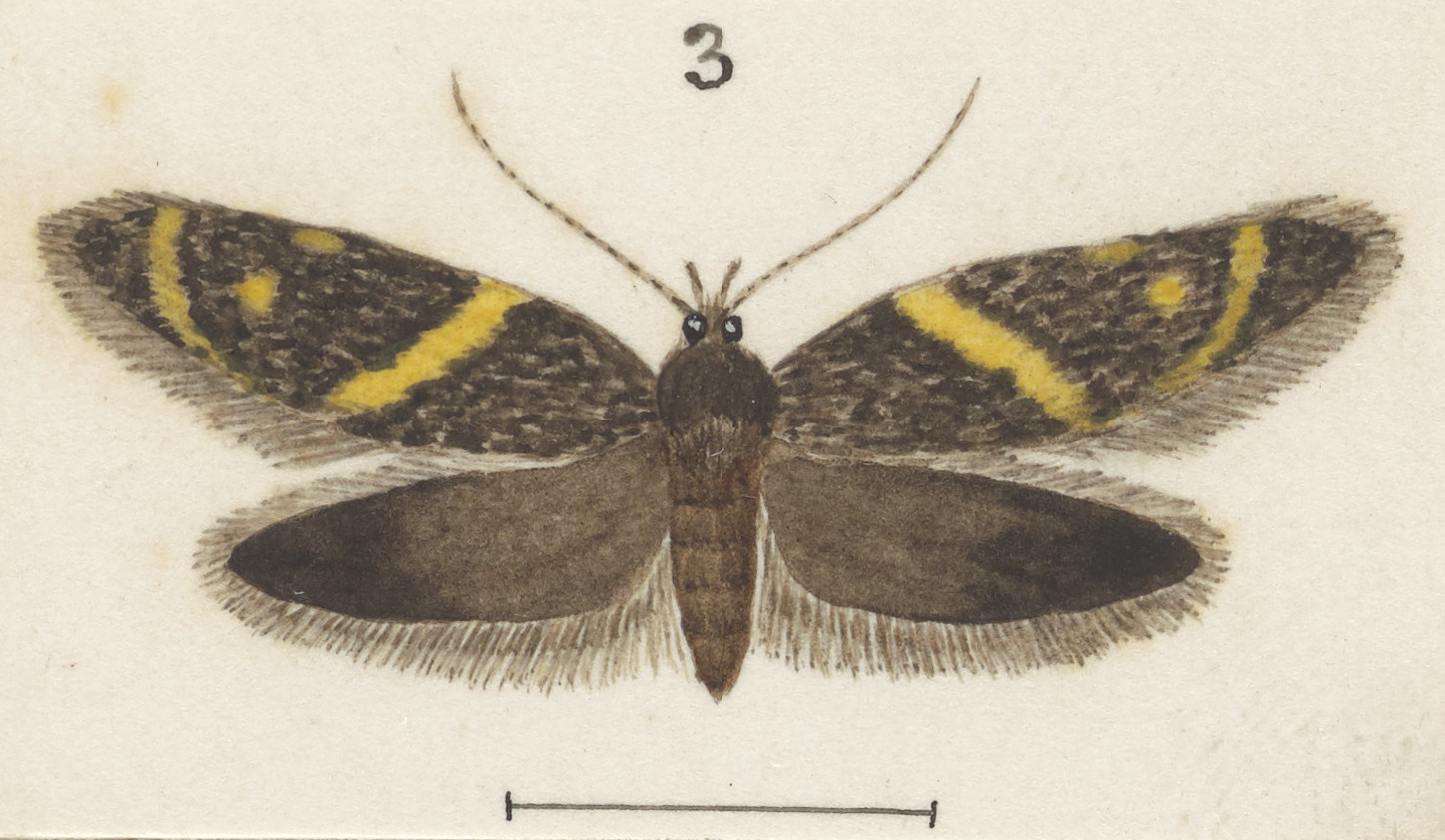
Illustration of species by George Hudson.

This species was described by Edward Meyrick in 1905 using a specimen he collected in Wellington in January. Meyrick named the species Borkhausenia loxotis. In 1926 Alfred Philpott studied the genitalia of the male of this species however his illustration does not agree with the lectotype or paralectotype specimens. George Hudson described and illustrated the species under this name in his 1928 publication The Moths and Butterflies of New Zealand. Hudson's illustration of the species is regarded as a poor representation. In 1988 John S. Dugdale assigned this species to the genus Tingena. The lectotype specimen is held at the Natural History Museum, London.

== Description ==
Meyrick described the species as follows:

♂︎. 11-12 mm. Head and palpi dark fuscous irrorated with ochreous-whitish. Antennae dark fuscous, pale-ringed. Thorax and abdomen dark fuscous. Fore-wings elongate, costa moderately arched, apex round-pointed, termen very obliquely rounded; dark fuscous; some scattered pale yellowish scales along submedian fold; a narrow straight pale ochreous-yellowish fascia, edged with some black scales, from 1/4 of costa to 2/3 of dorsum; a pale ochreous-yellow dot in disc at 2/3, and sometimes others on costa beyond middle and at tornus; a more or less indicated subterminal line of pale yellowish scales, starting from a small costal spot : cilia fuscous, irrorated with yellow-whitish. Hind-wings dark fuscous; cilia fuscous, with darker basal shade.

== Distribution ==
This species is endemic to New Zealand. This species has been collected at the Wellington Botanic Gardens and more recently at Taihape.

== Biology and behaviour ==
The adults of this species is on the wing in December and January. Hudson regarded this species as having semi domesticated habits, being found in gardens and entering houses.

== Conservation status ==
In 2025 this species was classified by the New Zealand Department of Conservation as "data deficient" under the New Zealand Threat Classification System.
