= Summer City (Wellington) =

New Zealand arts festival

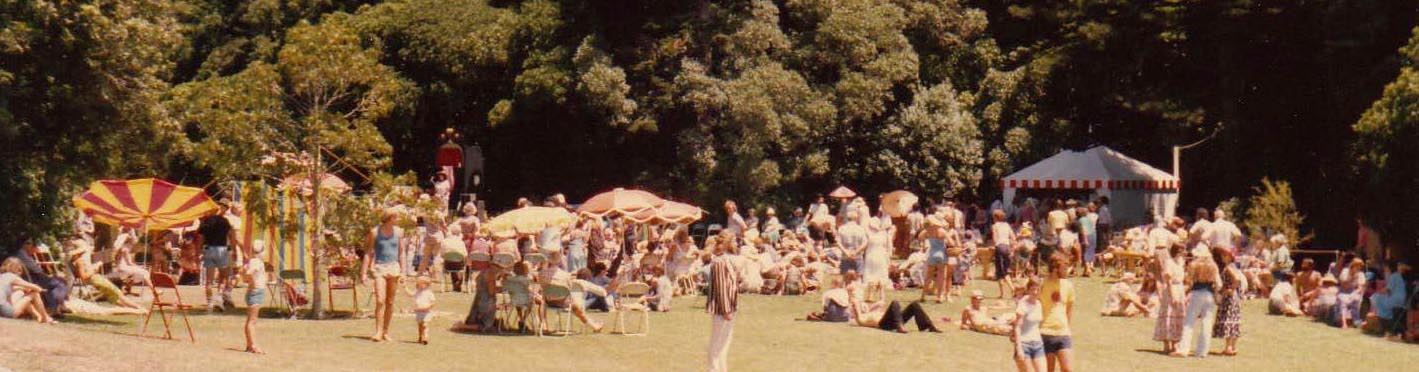
A Sunday afternoon crowd in the Dell during Summer '79

Summer City was a summer entertainment programme staged throughout Wellington, the capital city of New Zealand. It was run from January 1979 to 1987 by the Wellington City Council’s Parks and Recreation Department and the Wellington Community Arts Council, utilising the Department of Labour’s Temporary Employment Programme (TEP), the Project Employment Programme, and the Student Community Services Programme. After the Government's funding ceased the programme was continued by the city council directly.

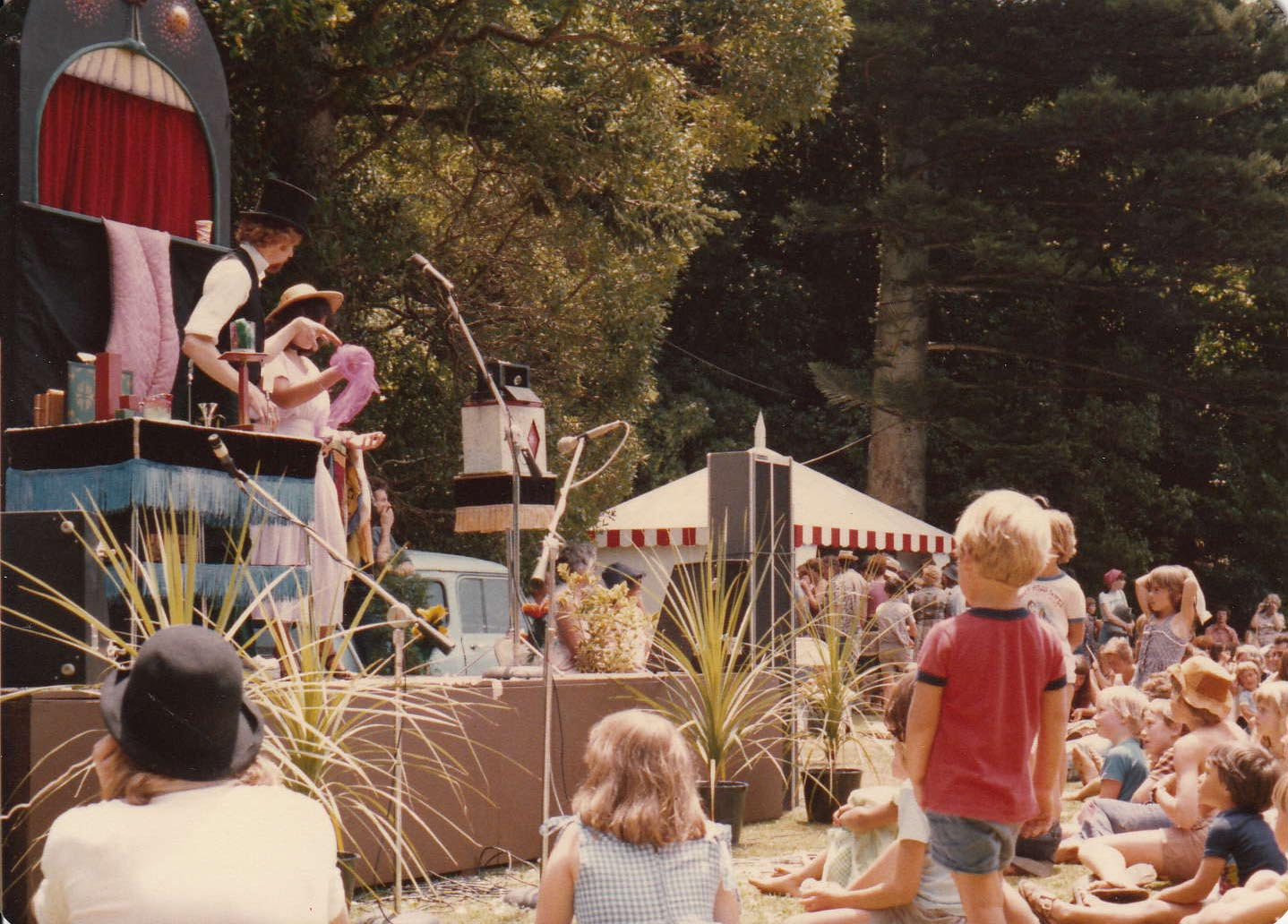
Entertainment in the Dell during Summer '79

Two of the guiding philosophies of the programme were the encouragement of more diverse public use of Wellington’s many parks, reserves, and beaches, and to be a positive inducement for families to conserve energy by remaining in the Capital for their summer holidays. It was typified by the “Dell Season”, the anchor point of the programme, which attracted annual totals in excess of 100,000 attendees. Artists and technical staff were employed with the purpose of gaining experience and hence future employment.

== Origins: Summer '79. ==
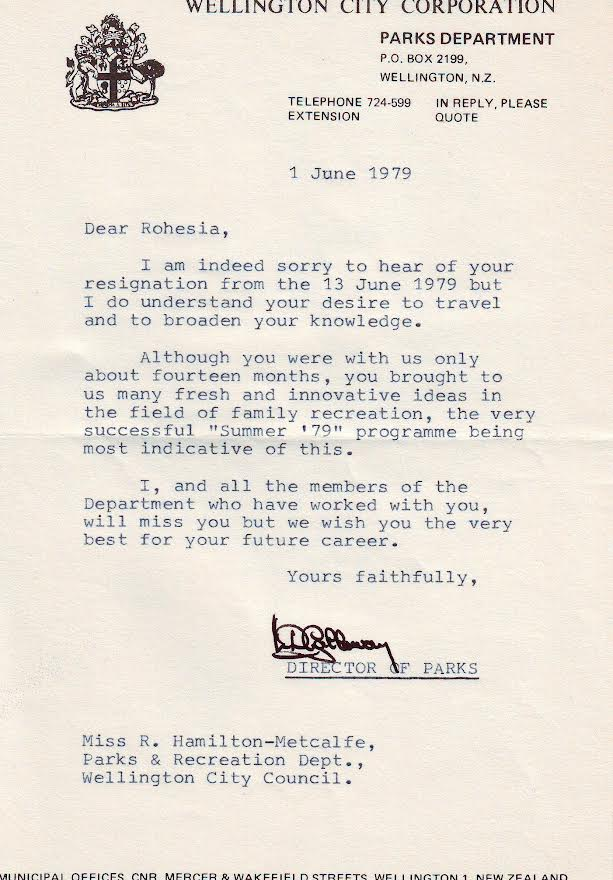
Letter from WCC

The Summer City programme started as a citywide outdoor performing arts festival, Summer ’79, created by Rohesia Hamilton Metcalfe of the Wellington City Council Parks and Recreation Department in the course of her work forming new projects to promote the public parks of Wellington.

Taking inspiration from the Artists Co-op's employing of artists in 1978 under the government's TEP scheme, Hamilton Metcalfe arranged full-time employment for four performing groups: Chameleon (a street theatre group headed by Aileen Davidson), Serendipity (a group of musicians headed by Michelle Scullion), Mask Theatre (a group headed by Murray Edmond) and the Gallery Dancers (a group headed by Paul Jendon and Jennifer de Leon).

Graeme Nesbitt and Len Nightingale were employed to help expand the programme and organise events. Dransfield House (355 Willis Street) was converted to office and rehearsal space for the staff and artists. Nesbitt added four People's Park Days, several rock concerts, and a programme of Gamelan music and dance. Local restaurants and other artists, including several Artists Co-op members, also contributed to Summer '79 events.

The programme opened in the Dell at Wellington Botanic Garden on 7 January with a garden party that included a full afternoon of family entertainment (theatrical, dance, music, and readings) and a temporary outdoor restaurant. The programme continued until February 28, including themed events in the Dell every Sunday, performances at the Wellington Zoo and in the Town Belt, and People's Parks Days in suburban parks. The programme's success led to it being continued as an annual summer festival with a new name, Summer City.

The Parks Department's focus on developing family recreation and promoting more use of the parks reflected the parallel work of Barry Thomas and others to intervene and utilise otherwise vacant or under-utilised spaces in the city.

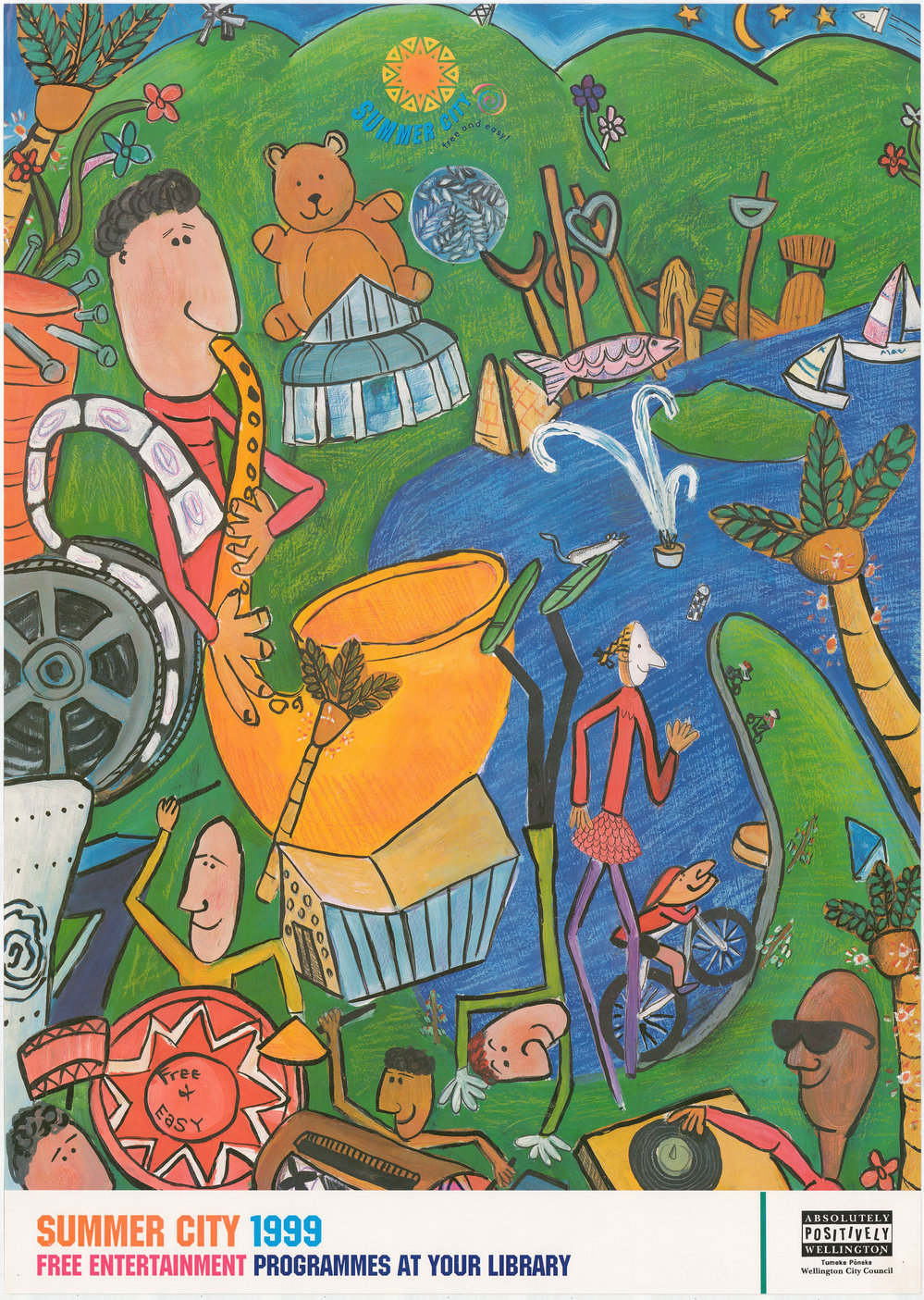
Poster for Summer City 1999 Wellington, New Zealand

== Summer City ==
Hamilton Metcalfe left the Parks Department in June 1979 and Nesbitt became the Director of the newly named Summer City, now established in the Arts Centre at 355 Willis Street in Dransfield House. Artists were given relatively free rein to create tours, events, groups, art events, music, theatre, and even magic shows. Venues across the city were jointly selected and timetabled to create a rolling platter of free summer-centred events. Employment went from being housed under the Dominion Museum to the Wellington Community Arts Council.

Artists, technical staff, and management were employed under the Department of Labour's Temporary Employment Programme (TEP) and Student Community Services Programme (SCSP) which grew into the Project Employment Programme (PEP) from 1982.

Summer City was used as branding for Wellington City Council summer events through the 1980s, 1900's and early 2000s.

The Arts Centre moved to the Band Rotunda in Oriental Bay then to Toi Poneke.

== Events and activities ==
The programme offered a very broad range of arts, entertainment and genres: concerts, clowning, portraiture, face painting, circus, dance, modern music, classical music, theatre, poetry, film making, movies, story telling, festivals, comedy, magic, fine art exhibitions, flying lips, travelling shows, exhibitions, Oriental Bay pavement painting, harbour spectacular, tagged fishing competition, sky diving, photography and making a film .

The Sun Festival involved 3000 school children and attracted 60,000 festival goers and thousands of local participants. Composer Jenny McLeod spent three months in the lead up to the Sun Festival event (1983)

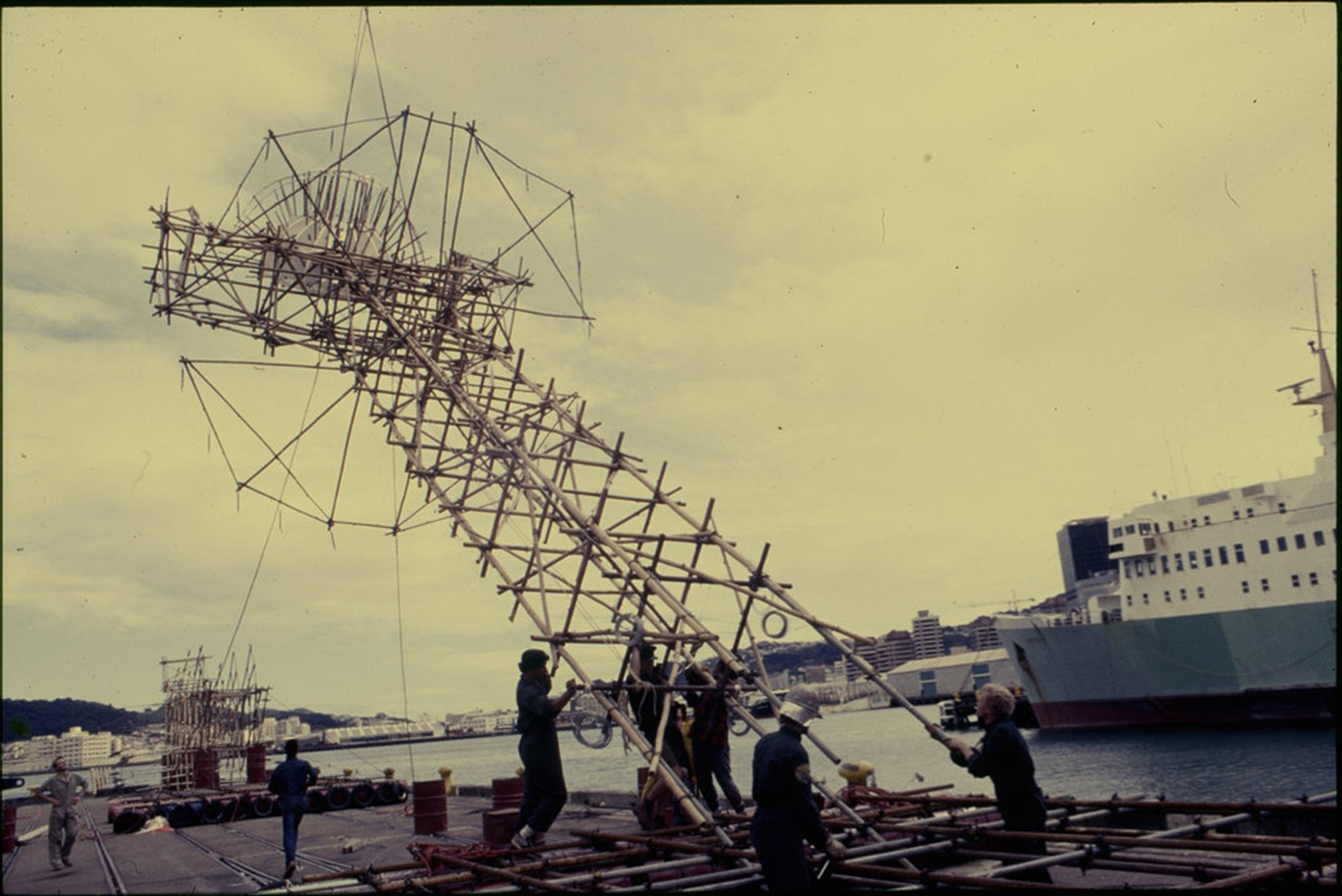
Joe Bleakley designed Sun Festival tower being erected prior to being towed into Oriental Bay carrying fireworks

teaching 1000 school children to sing her compositions, with the vision for them to be singing together in Oriental Parade in a massive open-air concert.

Town and Country Players toured the whole South Island by ferry and train, Gestetner People's News published a daily newspaper, live farm animals madrigal singing, travelling tree house with native trees Punch and Judy, puppetry, Night Dance and lighting extravaganza, demonstrations of sky diving, dog trials, show jumping and trampolines, Peter Pan Pirate day, video games, donkey and cart, jazzercize, kitemaking, Birdman competition, rock barge, teaching: potting, yarn spinning hangis All Nations Day, hang gliders, Town and Country day, motorcycle road race, haggis hurling, contemporary day, National Play Day.

== Artists and groups ==
There were many employed and involved in Summer City and many went on to have established careers. In 1980 there were between 40 and 50 artists employed with the Student Community Service and the Temporary Employment Programme (TEP).

=== Artists (employed on temporary, project or one off contracts) ===
Up to the mid-1980s some of the artists employed included: Stephanie Arlidge, Paul Baeyertz, John Bailey, Ian Barbie, Rose Beauchamp, Jean Betts, Joe Bleakley, Callie Blood, Peter Boyd, Allan Brunton, Debra Bustin, Clive Carter, Peter Cathro, Allan Clouston, Andrew Clouston, Russel Collins, Jonathan Crayford, Terry Crayford, Gerard Crewdson, Alastair Cuthil, Peter Daly, David Daniela, Peter Dasent, John Davies, Tim Denton, Anthony Donaldson, Neil Duncan, Murray Edmond, Martin Edmond, Janet Elepans, Fane Flaws, Rodger Fox, Garth Frost, Andrea Gilkison, Shelley Graham, Pamela Gray, Mike Gubb, Peter Hambleton, Megan Hanley, Neil Hannan. Ross Harris, Anna Holmes, Geoff Hughes, Deborah Hunt, Timothy Hyde, Alison Isadora, Paul Jenden, Bruno Lawrence, Jennifer de Leon, Stephen Jessup, May Lloyd, Louise Loft, Stephen McCurdy, Jenny McLeod, Kassie McCluskie, Bill McDowell, Blair McLaren, Jon McLeary, Rob Mahoney, Tina Matthews, Joanne Mildenhall, Jenny Morris, Michael Mulheron, Sarah Mulheron, Bronwen Murray, Liz Ngan, David O'Donnell, Mary Paul, Stuart Porter, Jan Preston, Shaun Preston, Ian Prior, Jorge Quevedo, Alistair Riddell, Sally Rodwell, Barrie Saunders, Michelle Scullion, Roger Sellers, Brian Sergent, Duncan Sergent, Harry Sinclair, Rima Te Wiata, Allan Thomas, Barry Thomas, Edwina Thorne, Rochelle Vincent, The Wizard Tim Woon, Sally Zwartz

=== Groups ===
The programme up to the mid-1980s showcased some of the following groups of musicians and theatre companies:

- Serendipity - Michelle Scullion, Carmel McGlone, Belinda Carey, Edwina Thorne
- The Gallery dancers
- Earthsong
- Chameleon - Aileen Davidson, Timothy Hyde, Ray Calcutt, Liz, May Lloyd
- Gamelan orchestra - Allan Thomas
- Mask Theatre - Murray Edmond
- Town and Country Players - Murray Edmond and Mary Paul toured throughout NZ. South Island tour - Aileen Davidson, Barry Thomas, Michael Mulheron, Shelley Graham
- Negative Theatre - Louise Loft, Jon McLeary
- The Buccaneers - Stuart Porter, Phil Bowering, Roger Sellers, Callie Blood, Neil Duncan
- Red Mole (Theatre Company) was employed to entertain bathers at Oriental Bay on a floating barge stage
- Rough Justice - Rick Bryant, Nick Bollinger
- Wide Mouth Frogs - Tina Matthews, Sally Zwartz, Jenny Morris, Andrea Gilkison, Katie Brokie, Sarah Mulheron, Bronwen Murray, Tony Backhouse, Michelle Scullion, Michael Mulheron, Callie Blood
- The Warratahs - Barry Saunders, Wayne Mason, Nik Brown, John Donahue, Marty Jorgensen, Clinton Brown, Rob Clarkson
- Jasmin - Jonathan Crayford, Bruno Lawrence, Dave Ades, Geoff Hughes, Jorge Quevedo, Patrick Bleakley
- The Maori Sidesteps
- Rodger Fox Big Band
- Topp Twins
- Valley Stompers
- Free Radicals - Jonathan Besser, Ross Harris
- Blue Ladder Theatre/Soluble Fish Ensemble - Shadow puppets, music and stage performance at The Dell, Oriental Parade and Brooklyn Park: Bill Direen, Carol Woodward and various including children participants.
- Splints
- Sydney Street West Quartet
- Footnote Dancers
- Captain Frootkakes Punch and Judy Show (Note: Letter from WCC to Garth Frost 20 March 1979)
- Sun Chasers
- Hot City Cats
- Family Mallet
- Buccaneers
- Classic Comments

== Programme Directors ==
The first three managers worked from The Arts Centre at 355 Willis street

- Rohesia Hamilton Metcalfe - Promotions of Parks and creator of Summer '79
- Graeme Nesbitt - Summer City 1979-1980
- Stephen Nelson - Summer City 1981-1982
- Darcy Nicholas - Summer City
- Fiona Gunter-Firth - Summer City Toi Poneke

== Staff and Technicians ==
=== Summer City staff ===
- Peter Frater - Technical Manager
- Tom Wilton - Electrician
- Malcom McSporran - Journalist
- Rod Bryant - Journalist
- Ray Calcutt - Staging
- Jane Armstrong - Secretary
- Len Nightingale - Outdoor stage manager
- Delia Shanly - Events Coordinator

=== Wellington City Council staff ===
- Ian Galloway - Director of Parks and Reserves
- Colin Knox - Deputy Town Clark
- Dave Lee - Recreation Officer
- John Dawson - Manager summer city for Parks 1980 - Parks
- Di Jordan - Assistant to John Dawson - Parks

=== Radio ===
Ken Sparks and Deborah Nation were employed under the Art Centre to deliver regular radio information about Summer city for Radio New Zealand's National Programme.

=== Photographers ===
- Ans Westra
- Peter Black
- Mark Hantler

== Venues ==
Venues were found throughout the city:

- Botanic Garden's Dell
- Ben Burn Park
- Anderson Park
- Wellington East Girls College, Onslow College, Town Belt, Berhampore Golf Course, Plimmer Park, Hataitai Park, Central Park
- Sound Shell
- Oriental Bay
- Cuba Mall
- Seatoun Park
- Scorching Bay
- Strathmore park
- Island Bay Playground
- Wellington Zoo
- Frank Kitts Park
- Prince of Wales Park
- Lyall Bay
- Queen Elizabeth Park
