= Pōneke =

Pōneke may refer to:

- one of the Māori names for Wellington
- Ngāti Pōneke, urban Māori cultural club in Wellington
- HMS Poneke (1883), New Zealand torpedo boat

== See also ==
- Toi Pōneke Arts Centre
