= Graeme Nesbitt =

- Born: Graeme John Nesbitt; 27 November 1950; Auckland, New Zealand
- Died: 14 May 2000 (aged 49); Kuala Lumpur, Malaysia
- Occupation(s): Music, arts & radio promoter, academic
- Years active: 1960s – 2000

Graeme John Nesbitt (27 November 1950 – 14 May 2000) was a music, arts and radio promoter from New Zealand. He was involved in the development and founding of cultural events in New Zealand including the New Zealand Festival of the Arts, Summer City in Wellington and the New Zealand Music Awards.

== Biography ==
Nesbitt grew up in Kohukohu, New Zealand. His father was postmaster. They moved to Wellington in 1965, Nesbitt went to Upper Hutt College and was a senior in 1967. They lived in part of the old Trentham Military Camp and Nesbitt had a large room where he could practice and play music 'without disturbing anyone'. At school he met musicians Ray Mercer, Alastair Richardson (later in The Fourmyula). He also formed a duo with Krissy Klocek called Los Pescadores and they performed Wellington coffee houses, (e.g. Chez Paree, Monde Marie).

Nesbitt made an immense contribution to the New Zealand music industry. He was instrumental in starting and furthering the careers of such well known New Zealand entertainers as Jenny Morris, Dragon and the magician Tim Woon.

Nesbitt was responsible for the development of the New Zealand Festival of the Arts (Student Arts Council), Summer City (after Rohesia Hamilton Metcalf), New Zealand Music Awards, New Zealand Sports Hall of Fame.

In 1970 Nesbitt was part of setting up an arts festival in Wellington, and he was the Cultural Affairs Officer at Victoria University of Wellington.

I need students to answer phones, sell advertising, build bridges, dance naked, arrange deals and have a great time. Arts Festival and I need you. (Graeme Nesbitt, listing in Victoria University of Wellington student magazine Salient, 1970)

In 1972 Nesbitt was appointed as the first Director of the New Zealand Students Arts Council. In the same year he took a management role with the New Zealand band Mammal and they released the album Beware the Man (1972) with poet Sam Hunt.

In February 1974 Nesbitt became the manager of the band Dragon and they released their acclaimed album Universal Radio (1974).

Over the 1980s, Nesbitt was hired as the promo manager at Radio Windy and also did a stint at 2ZB Wellington. In the early 1990s, he was back in the radio game with working as ZMFM / 91ZM Wellington as the Promotions Manager.

== Later life and death ==
Nesbitt moved to Asia in the late 1990s and died of cancer in June 2000 at age 49.
