= Wellington Botanic Garden =

Public botanical garden in Wellington, New Zealand

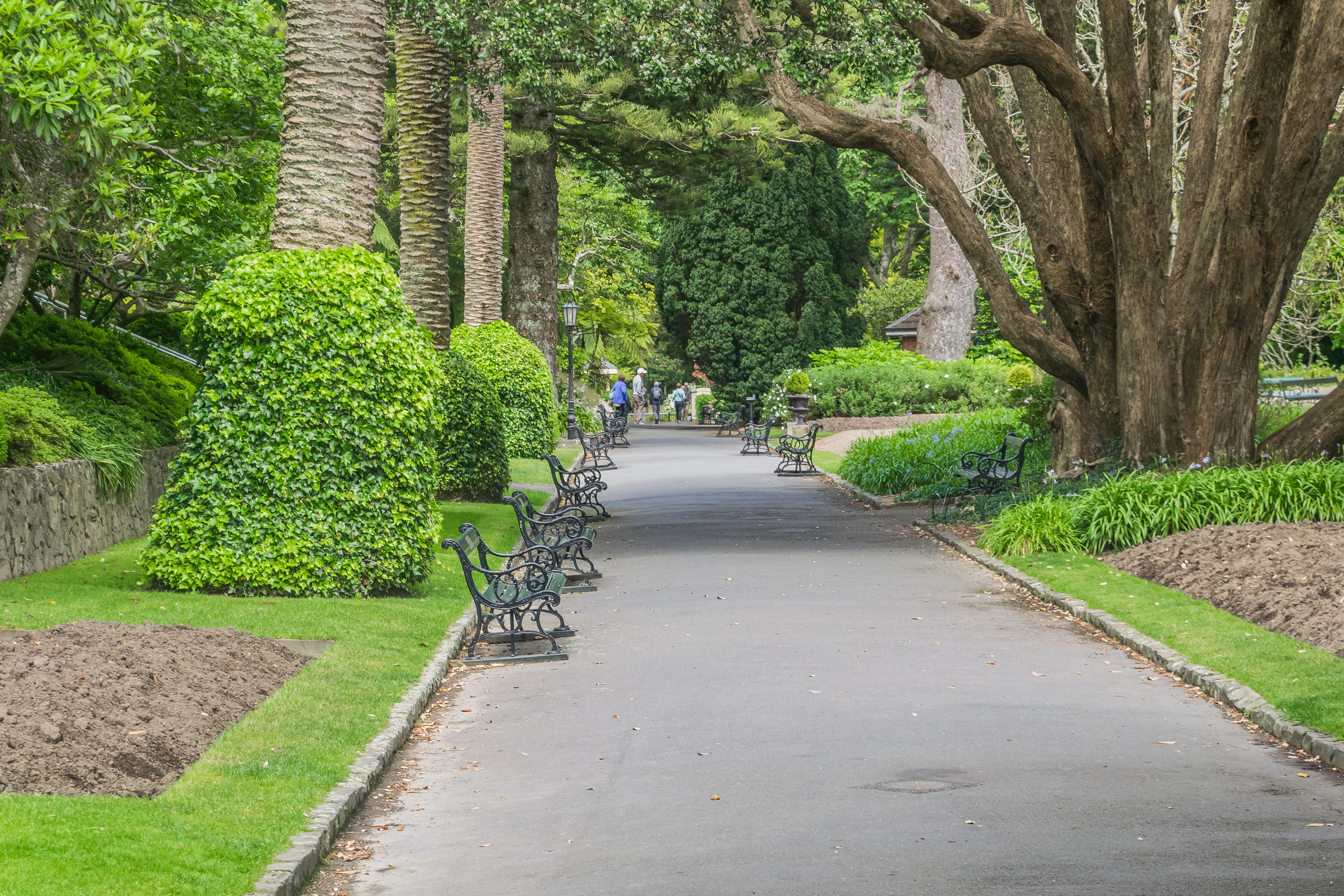
- A path in the Wellington Botanic Garden during spring
- Interactive map of Wellington Botanic Garden
- Type: Municipal botanical garden
- Location: Wellington, New Zealand
- Coordinates: 41.2829°S 174.7660°E
- Area: 25 ha (62 acres)
- Created: 1868
- Operator: Wellington City Council
- Status: Open all year
- Public transit: Metlink route 2 Wellington Cable Car

Wellington Botanic Garden (Māori: ki Paekākā) is a botanical garden close to central Wellington in New Zealand. It covers 25 ha (62 acres) of land in a valley between Thorndon and Kelburn, with Glenmore Street as a boundary along the valley floor. One of the access points is from the top of the Wellington Cable Car. The garden is managed by Wellington City Council, and features protected native forest, conifers, plant collections, seasonal displays and an extensive rose garden. Large sculptures are located throughout the garden.

Before the garden was established, the area was used by the Ngāti Te Whiti hapū of Te Āti Awa for growing and gathering food. It was later established as a botanic garden on a 5.3 ha (13-acre) site in 1868 and extended to 28 ha (68 acres) in 1871. The Botanic Garden contains remnants of lowland broadleaf native forest. A variety of native birds can be found in the garden.

It is classified as a Garden of National Significance by the New Zealand Gardens Trust, and in 2004 it was listed as a historic area by Heritage New Zealand.

== History ==
Wellington Botanic Garden is one of New Zealand's oldest botanic gardens. Before the garden was established, the area was used by the Ngāti Te Whiti hapū of Te Āti Awa for growing and gathering food for Kumutoto and Pipitea pā.

In 1839, the New Zealand Company made plans for a settlement in Port Nicholson (Wellington), including provision for a botanic garden. Land was bought from Māori in Wellington, but land for a garden was not set aside until 1844, when the Crown designated a 13-acre (5.3 ha) strip from the Kumutoto settlement for a botanic garden. In 1847, 53 acres adjoining the 13 acres was returned to Kumutoto Māori as compensation for their land and pā bought or taken by the New Zealand Company in 1840. In 1851, Kumutoto Māori sold this parcel of land back to the government, and in 1852 Governor Grey gave it to the Wesleyan Church Mission. This land became known as the Wesleyan Reserve. In 1865 it was sold to the Wellington Provincial Council for a public park.

The garden was established on the original 13-acre site in 1868 and extended to 28 ha (68 acres) in 1871. The land already set aside as a reserve was formally designated as "The Botanic Garden of Wellington" with the passing of the Botanic Garden Act 1869. The garden and the land it occupied were allocated to a Board of Governors under the 1869 act. The land was subsequently vested in the City of Wellington, with the passing of the Wellington Botanic Garden Vesting Act 1891. The 1891 act also set aside six acres of the Wesleyan Reserve for an observatory.

The botanic garden was initially managed by the New Zealand Institute (later renamed the Royal Society Te Apārangi) and its manager James Hector until 1891. It served three purposes: a trial ground for the government to test the economic potential of various plants, a place for scientists to collect and study native and introduced plants, and a place for the public to enjoy. A connection was maintained with London's Kew Gardens during the 1870s and 1880s, as with many gardens throughout the world in other parts of the British Empire at the time, and Wellington's gardens participated in an international exchange of seeds and specimens. The New Zealand Institute planted conifers as part of a programme to import plant species and assess their potential for economic benefit to New Zealand, and these came to form a framework and shelter for other plantings. The large Pinus radiata trees that are a feature in some areas of the garden were grown using the first seeds of the species that were imported into New Zealand from California.

Paths were laid out, native plants from other parts of New Zealand planted, and trees and plants labelled, "giving them popular Maori names instead of their scientific appellations [as] it would indeed be a pity not to see the native names of the New Zealand flora perpetuated as long as possible". The first map of the garden, by John Buchanan in 1875, also included a list of all plants growing there and a survey of native plants indigenous to the reserve. The area that would later become the Soundshell Lawn was levelled in 1880, and Hector established a teaching garden there.

Some animals were kept at the Botanic Garden prior to the formation of Wellington Zoo in Newtown in 1906, including the "City Emu" which died shortly after being relocated to the Zoo from the garden.

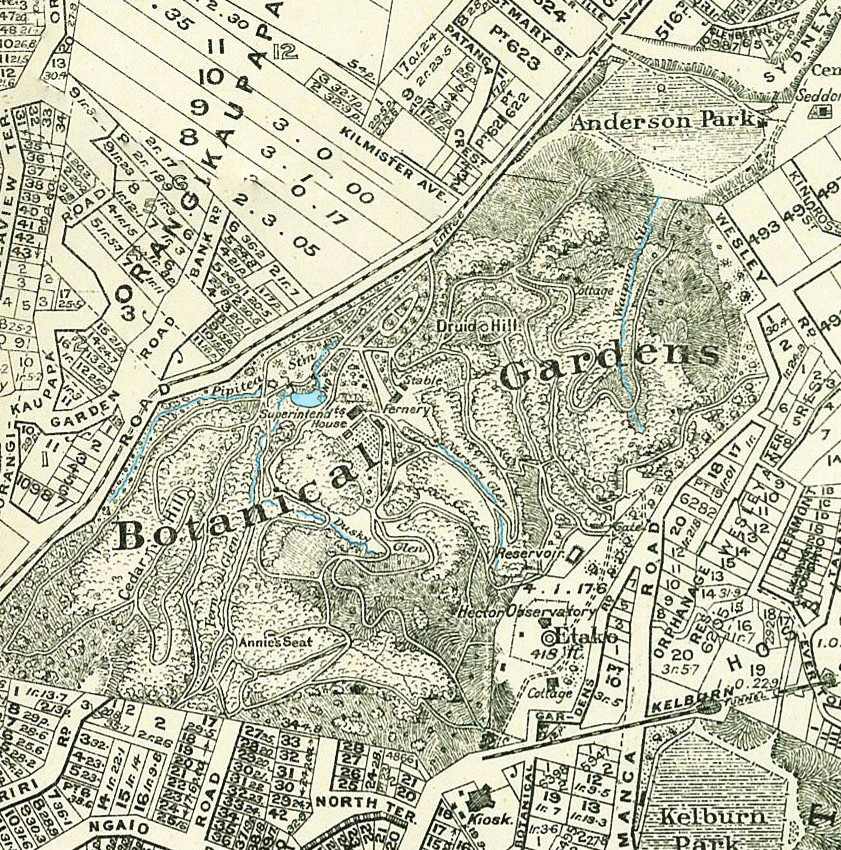
1920s map of the Botanic Garden, showing location of the duck pond and Pipitea, Pukatea and Waipirau Streams

Wellington City Council began managing the garden in 1891, tidying up and developing various parts of the garden to improve public amenity. The garden became more popular with the public after the cable car began operation in 1902 and trams started running along Glenmore Street in 1904. The council constructed a tea kiosk at the top of the cable car (1904), a playground near Anderson Park (1905), a band rotunda near the duck pond (1907), and a fernery (1911). Public toilets were installed and staff buildings constructed.

Various gullies were filled in and levelled. A gully at what is now Anderson Park was filled in between 1906 and 1910, with later work done between 1931 and 1934 when the park was made larger. The new flat area became Anderson Park sports ground. From 1927, a ridge in the southwest of the garden was flattened and a gully filled in to form Magpie Lawn and Puriri Lawn.

Later developments included the Lady Norwood Rose Garden (1953) which was created over a filled-in gully, Begonia House (1960), a herb garden (1970s), an information centre (1983–1987), the Treehouse education centre (1991) and a sculpture trail (1991).

Live music performances have taken place in the garden since the 1900s, including regular Sunday band performances at the band rotunda built in 1907. Later, a variety of music was performed at the Sound Shell, including pop concerts in the late 1960s and then Summer City events from the 1970s.

In 2019, Taranaki Whānui gifted the name ki Paekākā ("kākā perch") to the garden, and its official name then became 'Wellington Botanic Garden ki Paekākā'. Some Wellington City Councillors raised concerns that the public had not been consulted about the name change.

== Features ==
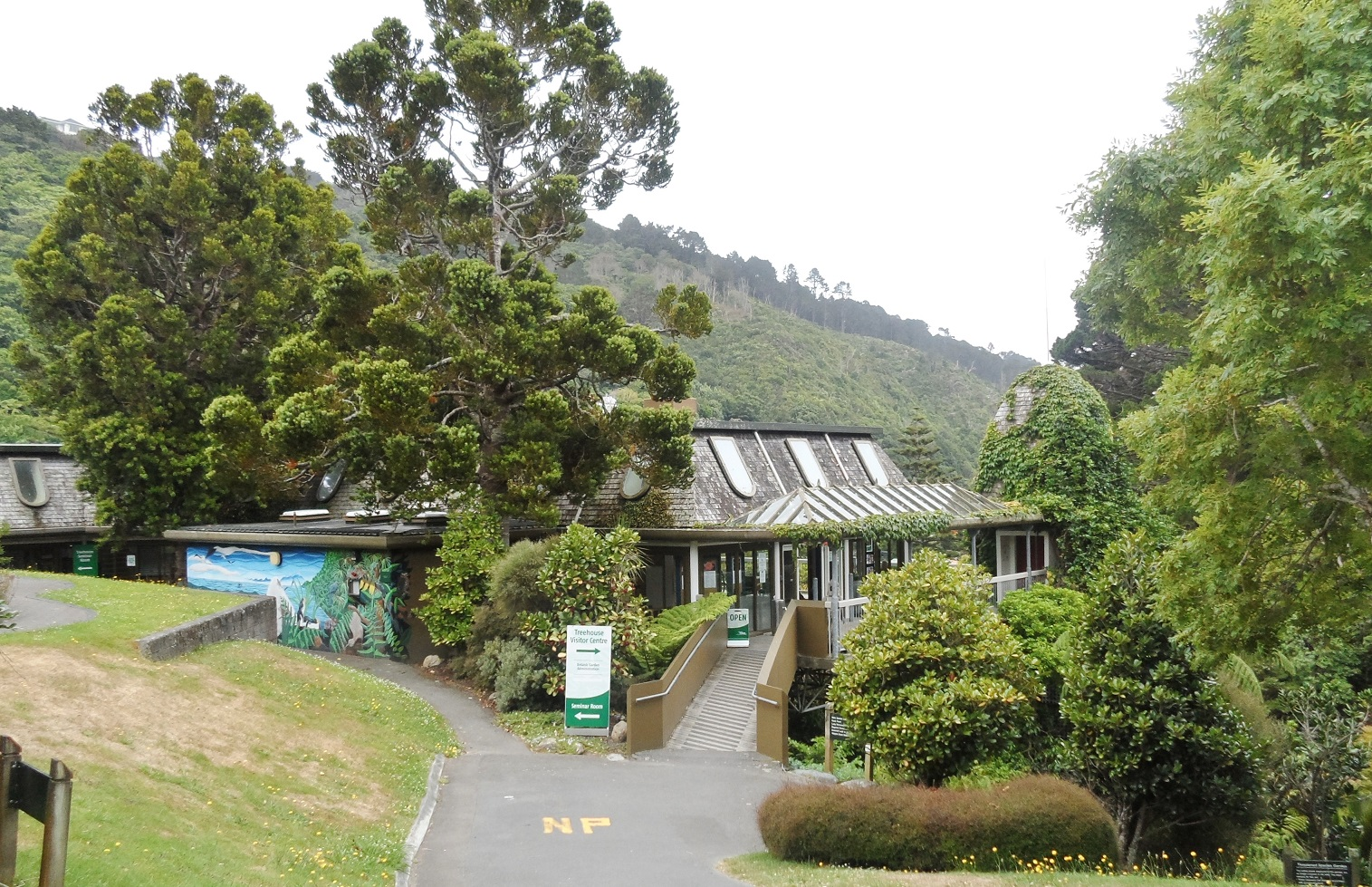
Treehouse, the Education and Environment Centre of the Garden

The garden contains many discrete collections including the Lady Norwood Rose Garden, rock gardens, cacti and succulents, an Australian garden, camellias, dwarf conifers, a fernery, a herb garden, a grass collection and a fragrant garden. Educational facilities include the Treehouse visitor centre and a discovery garden used for school visits, as well as talks and demonstrations by gardeners on topics such as 'pruning roses'. There are historic wooden and brick buildings formerly used as gardeners' accommodation, workshops and stables. A large playground contains a long slide and flying fox.

=== Lady Norwood Rose Garden and Begonia House ===
The rose garden site was originally a gully with the Waipiro Stream running through it. The gully was filled in and the rose garden was then established from 1950 to 1953, in time for that year's royal tour. It is named after Lady Norwood, former mayoress of Wellington, who donated £300 (equivalent to $14,500 in 2026) towards a proposed new begonia house in 1949, and in 1955 donated a fountain for the middle of the rose garden. In 1977, the fountain was replaced by a new one donated by Lady Norwood's children.

The rose garden contains 110 beds of roses, including new and traditional varieties, laid out in concentric circles around the fountain. Climbing roses grow around the colonnade that surrounds the garden. The flowering season stretches from November to April. The World Federation of Rose Societies awarded the garden a 'Garden of Excellence' award in 2015.

The Begonia House bordering the south side of the rose garden was opened in 1960, after a donation of £20,000 (equivalent to $592,500 in 2026) by Sir Charles Norwood, former mayor of Wellington. When it was built, the Begonia House was the largest glasshouse in the southern hemisphere. The Norwood family made further donations for landscaping around the Begonia House and rose garden during the 1970s and 1980s. The Begonia House consists of two wings holding tropical and temperate plants including orchids, begonias, cyclamens, ferns and epiphytes, connected by a central atrium. A café was added to the east wing in 1981, and the west wing was extended in 1989 with a large lily pond with fish and water lilies. The Begonia House is a popular venue for weddings and other functions.

In November 2024, Wellington City Council announced that it was considering demolishing the Begonia House, citing unspecified safety concerns, but in May 2025, the Council voted to preserve the Begonia House. Refurbishment is expected to cost $11 million and will include replacement of all the glass, repairs to the glasshouse structure and renovation of the staff facilities, public toilets, café and kitchen. A volunteer group, Friends of Wellington Botanic Gardens, will raise additional funds to pay for internal and external lighting, landscaping and events spaces. Donations by the public are to be recognised on an etched glass panel in the middle foyer of the glasshouse.

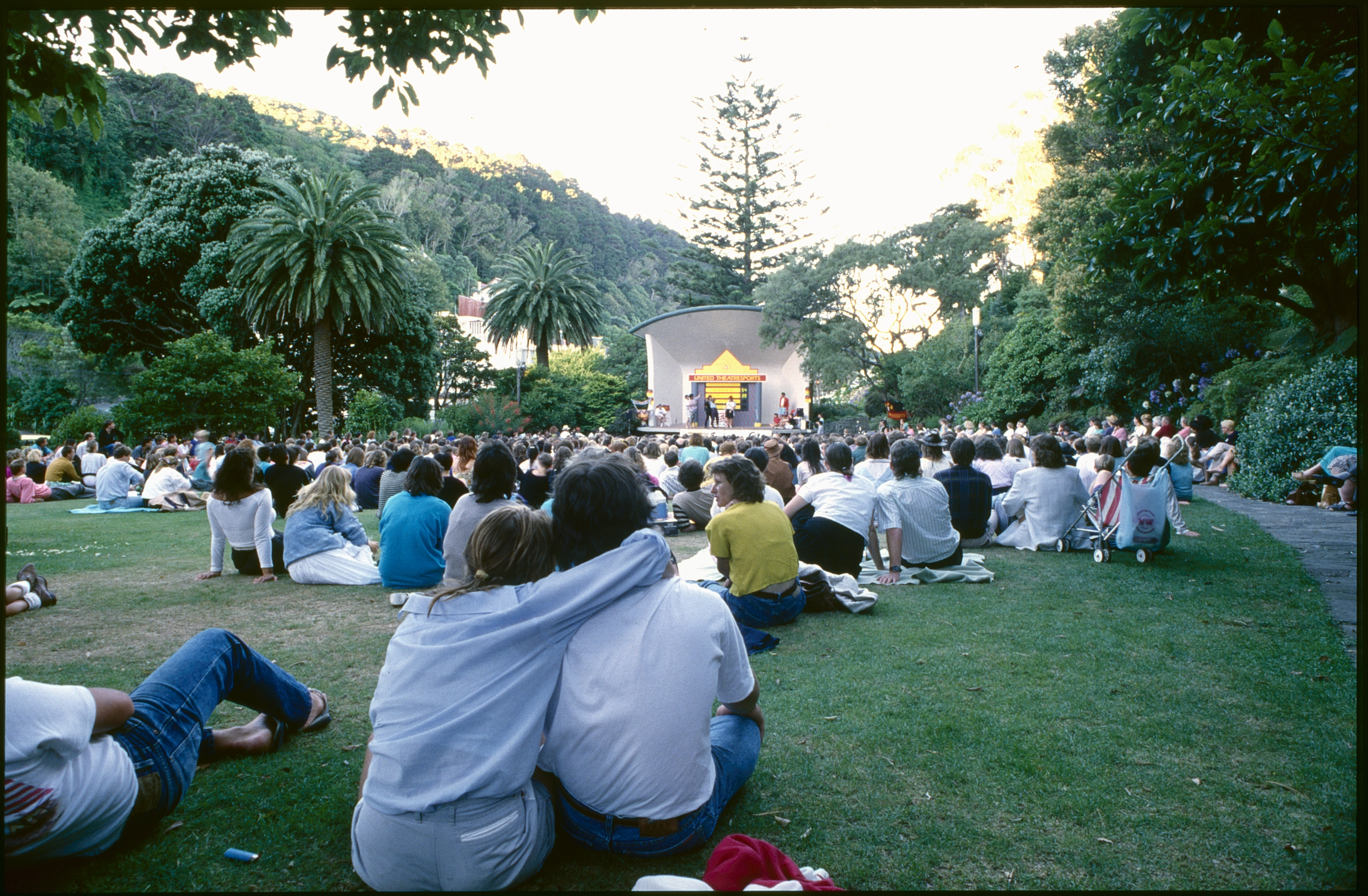
1984: Theatresports at the Sound Shell

=== Sound Shell ===
The Sound Shell Lawn was originally a teaching garden, then a rose garden. A wooden band rotunda was built in 1907 and in use until the concrete Sound Shell was built in 1953. The Wellington Bands Association proposed construction of the Sound Shell as a memorial to bandsmen who had fought and died in World Wars 1 and 2. A plaque on the structure states: "In commemoration of bandsmen of the Wellington District who served their king and country and of those who also made the supreme sacrifice. 1914–1918. 1939–1945. "Their sound is gone out into all lands" Psalm 19 v4." The Sound Shell and lawn form a sheltered area that has been used for many types of event, including band performances, music concerts, Christmas carols, open air dancing, plays, weddings and dance displays. During the summer Gardens Magic season, people picnic on the lawn, and trees around the area are lit up.

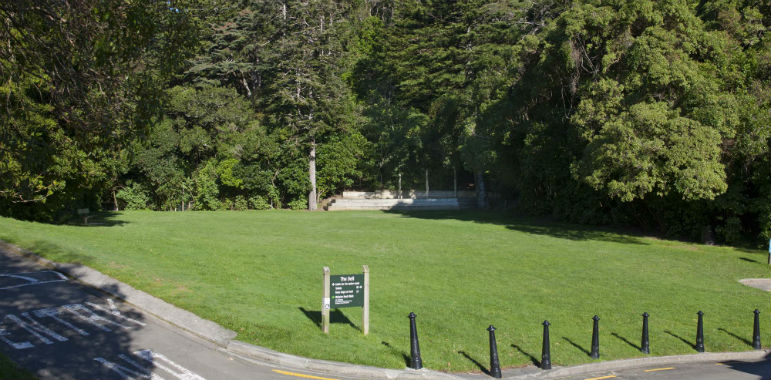
The Dell behind the Begonia House. A wooden stage can be seen in the background behind the lawn

=== The Dell ===
The Dell is a flat, sheltered lawn area of 1,670 m^{2} (18,000 sq ft) located behind the Begonia House. It is available for hire and has been used for a wide range of events including large picnics, music performances, outdoor theatre and outdoor cinema.

=== Duck pond ===
The duck pond is a naturally-formed pond, fed by the Pukatea and Pipitea streams, and has been a feature of the Botanic Garden since 1868. In times past it was known as the Frog Pond, the Lily Pond and the Swan Pond. In 1996 the pond was enlarged and reshaped, and its surroundings were upgraded with a small pavilion, wetland garden and lookout points. In 1998, landscape architect Stephen Dunn of Boffa Miskell won a silver award for his redesign of the pond, in a competition held by the New Zealand Institute of Landscape Architects and the Landscape Industries Association of New Zealand.

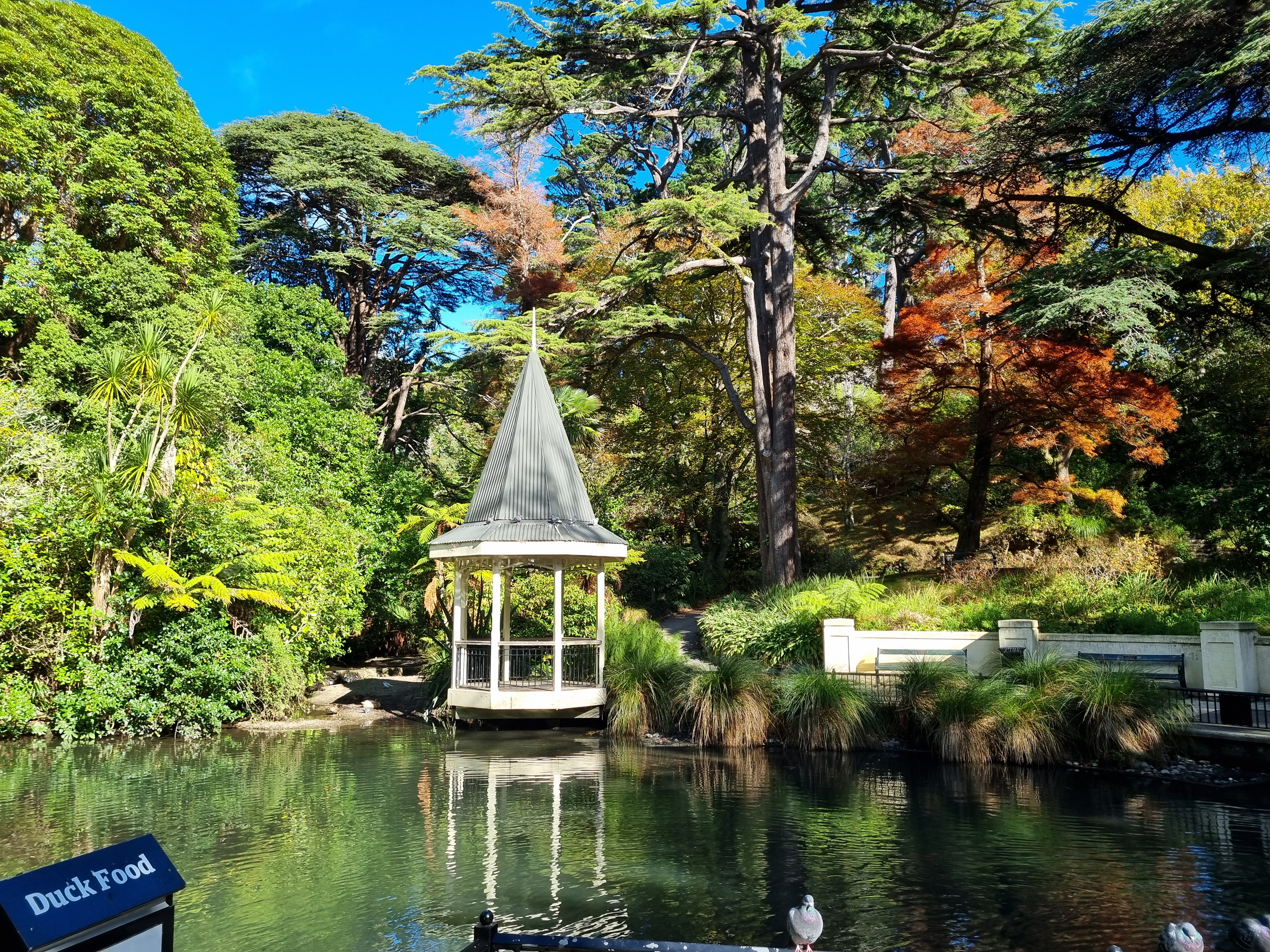
The duck pond

=== James Hector Pinetum ===
James Hector planted 127 species of conifers throughout the garden in the nineteenth century, with a view to finding out which species might be economically useful in New Zealand. Some of the conifers planted in the garden in the nineteenth and early twentieth century have since been classified as endangered in their natural habitats but have thrived in New Zealand, with Pinus radiata becoming a major export. Some pines and conifers have since been removed from the main garden to make space for other types of planting.

On Arbor Day 1992, the James Hector Pinetum was officially opened by then governor-general Dame Catherine Tizard in an area of the garden between Glenmore Street and the Mariri Road entrance, to commemorate Hector's work. Several governors-general have since planted pine trees in the pinetum. Some trees in the pinetum are more than 140 years old. Both mature trees and saplings planted by governors-general have been damaged by kākā ripping off bark to get at the trees' sap. A memorial to James Hector was unveiled in the pinetum in 2004.

=== Sculptures ===
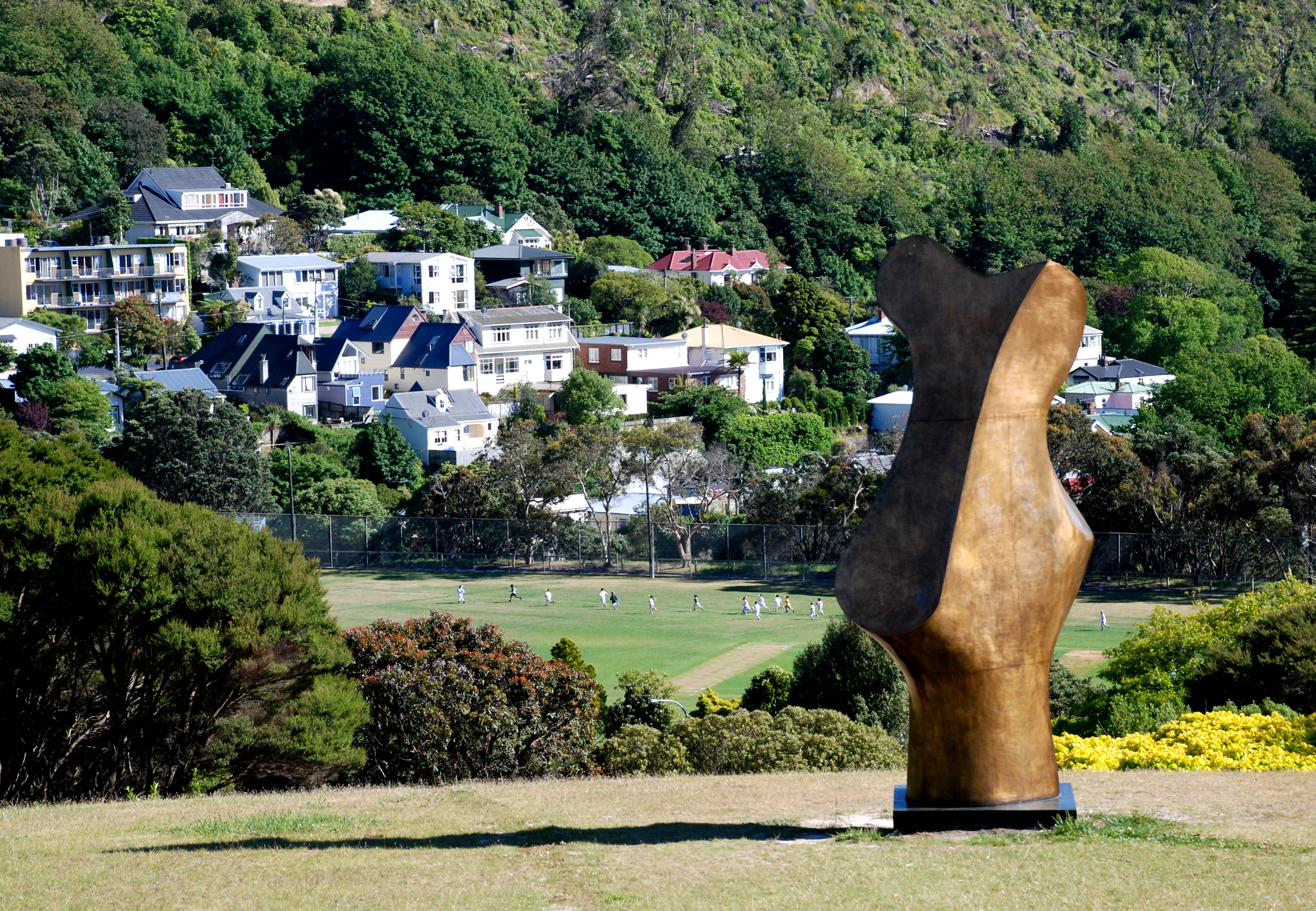
Bronze Form by Henry Moore

There are a variety of sculptures in the Botanic Gardens. Near the Founders Entrance are two small statues of a child pouring water from a jar. The original statues were made of cast iron and installed in the garden between 1906 and 1910. After the statues were stolen and returned, replicas were made in bronze for display, while the original iron statues are kept in safe storage. Also near the Founders Entrance is the Joy fountain which consists of a round pool with three frogs spouting water, with a central figure of a child with doves, carved in Hinuera stone. The work was completed in 1946.

In 1975 the Japan Society of New Zealand gifted a carved stone lantern that is now located in the Peace Garden adjacent to the Lady Norwood Rose Garden. In 1994 the lantern was adapted to house the Hiroshima Peace Flame in recognition of Wellington's nuclear free status.

In the 1990s, Wellington Sculpture Trust began a project to place sculptures in the garden. The result is the Botanic Garden Walk, a loop walk through the garden that takes in six sculptures, including one by Henry Moore.

=== Treehouse visitor centre ===
The Treehouse is a visitor and education centre, shop and administration centre located in the middle of the gardens. The facilities include a seminar room and exhibition area. The Treehouse was built in 1991 in a partnership between Wellington City Council and the World Wildlife Fund (WWF). WWF had its national office in the building and delivered education programmes from there, but moved out in 2010.

== Notable trees and plants ==
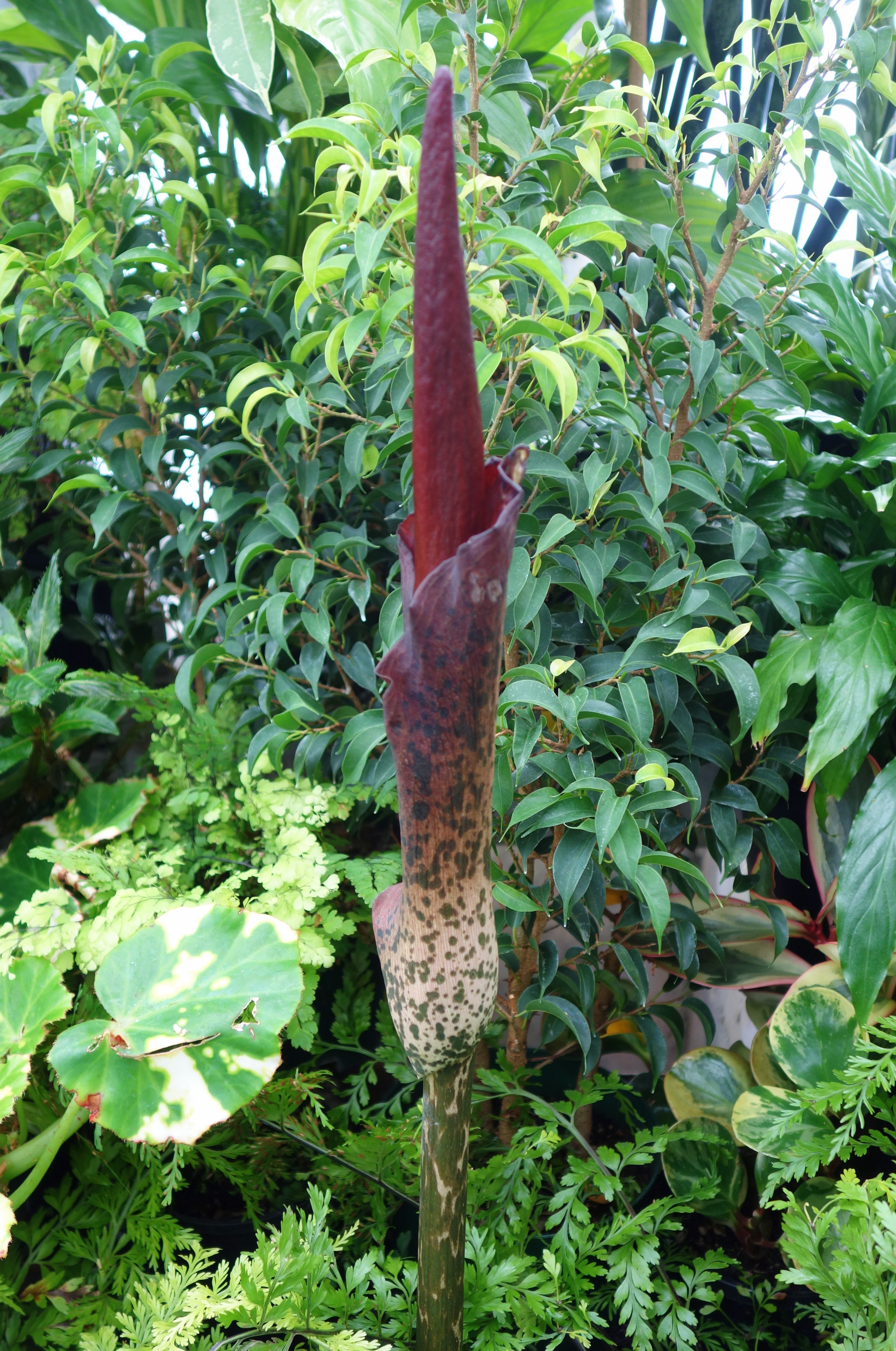
Amorphophallus konjac in the Begonia House

The Botanic Garden contains remnants of lowland broadleaf native forest. These pockets of forest cover eight hectares near Fern Glen Stream, Stable Gully, and the Salamanca hillside south of the Lady Norwood Rose Garden. There are areas of predominantly kānuka, kāmahi or kohekohe, but also large hinau and rātā trees that have survived since pre-European times. Although these forest remnants have been modified by human interaction and introduced species and pests, they still have much scientific and heritage value.

The New Zealand Tree Register lists noteworthy native and introduced tree specimens in the garden, for example a Pinus pinea planted around 1870 as part of the Botanic Garden's early role in assessing the economic potential of introduced species. The genetic value of trees like this has increased since their decline in their native habitats.

A threatened species garden next to the Treehouse education centre displays native plants that are under threat.

Near the Cable Car Entrance to the garden is a cypress planted in the 1970s which has been pruned into a 'bucket' shape. The tree, nicknamed the 'trippy tree' or 'bucket tree', is known as a hangout for students, who climb into the tree where they can see but not be seen. A 'Top 10 trees' list in 2013 described the tree: "a circular platform formed by branches at the top of the "trippy tree" gives sweeping views of Wellington. Authorities are wary of drunken antics at the site". In 2014 the Draft Management Plan for the Botanic Garden recommended removal of the tree, but in a submission on the plan, the Friends of the Wellington Botanic Garden stated: "We are aware of the difficulties with the ‘bucket tree’ and note its planned removal. It is, however, a garden iconic feature known to many visitors who comment favourably when they see it." In 2022 the tree was fenced off, with a sign stating: "please do not climb me – my branches aren’t as strong as they used to be".

An unusual plant in the garden is the voodoo lily, Amorphophallus konjac, which only flowers once every few years and smells like rotting meat. Plants such as this attract a lot of public interest.

== Wildlife ==
A variety of native birds can be found in the garden. One notable bird is the kākā, a large native parrot that has become common in the garden since a breeding programme was established at Zealandia. The increased number of kākā has led to serious damage to historic redwood trees and Norfolk pines in the garden, as the birds peel off bark to get to the trees' sap. In March 2024, two mature redwoods planted around the 1870s had to be removed from the garden because of decay caused by kākā damage.

Glowworms are visible some nights along paths in the main garden near the duck pond, and visitors can take a tour to see them.

== Events ==
=== Summer City / Gardens Magic ===
As part of its Summer City programme, Wellington City Council organised events in the Botanic Garden during summers from 1979 to the early 2000s, including live Shakespeare, free movies, teddy bears' picnics and free concerts. The concert series continued at the Sound Shell and in 2024 celebrated 44 years of concerts. The series is titled Gardens Magic and also includes a light show.

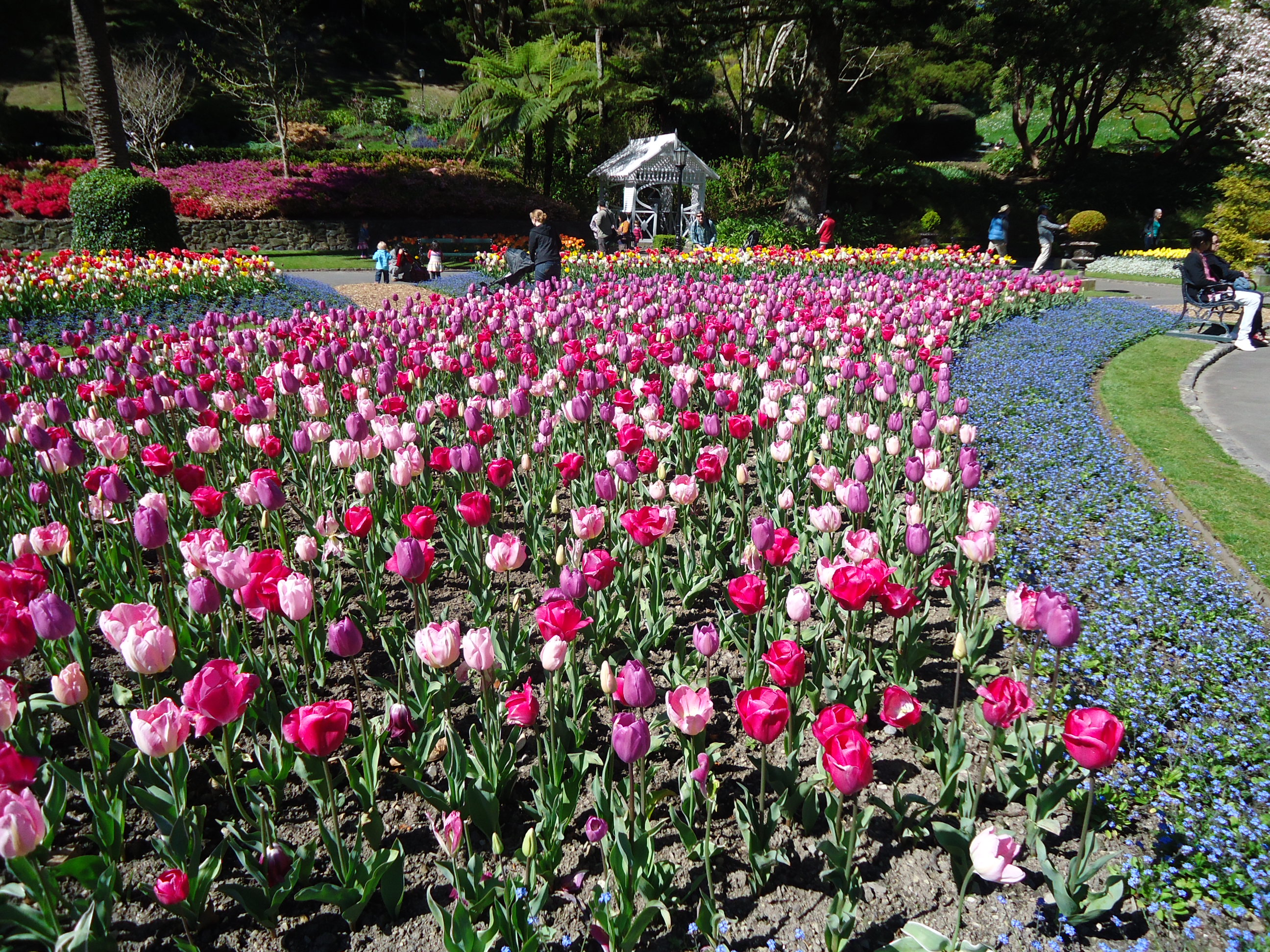
Tulip display, 2010

=== Tulip Sunday ===
From 1944 until 2023, Tulip Sunday was part of a spring festival held annually in the gardens, usually near the end of September. Visitors enjoyed seeing the flower beds near the Founders Entrance filled with masses of tulips in full bloom, and could enjoy entertainment (often Dutch-themed) organised by Wellington City Council and sponsors. The date of the event was decided months in advance due to the organisation required, but sometimes the tulips reached full bloom earlier or later than the scheduled date because of the weather. Tulip Sunday in Wellington began in 1944 with between 10,000 and 20,000 tulips on display and music provided by a band. The event received a boost in 1948, when the Netherlands government gave 25,000 tulip bulbs to Wellington in recognition of New Zealand's welcome to Dutch refugees after World War 2. In 2024, Wellington City Council advised that since it had changed to a more sustainable planting scheme, it would no longer hold Tulip Sunday.

== Conservation ==
Under the framework of the Global Strategy for Plant Conservation, the Botanic Garden acts as a reservoir for plant diversity and preservation of species, and provides seeds and cuttings of plants to researchers, conservation groups and gardeners.

== Sustainability ==
In 2013 Wellington Gardens, Wellington City Council's umbrella organisation, which includes the Botanic Garden, Ōtari-Wilton's Bush, Truby King Park and Bolton Street Cemetery, became certified as a CarboNZero organisation. Under this programme, the Botanic Garden aimed to reduce waste, energy consumption, travel and fuel, by means such as replacing power tools with electric ones and altering the way the glasshouses are managed. Instead of using gas heaters to warm the glasshouses, piped hot water from electric heat pumps is used. In 2024, the garden announced a new planting scheme in the main garden. By changing the irrigation and mix of plants on display, the garden will become more sustainable, shifting from planting every six months to planting only every three to five years.

Low-toxicity chemicals and natural predators such as ladybirds (which eat aphids) are used to maintain the health of roses in the Lady Norwood Rose Garden.

== Visitors and tourism ==
The Botanic Garden is a popular attraction for visitors to Wellington and rated in the top five visitor attractions in the city by Lonely Planet in 2024. In 2023, Wellington City Council reported that the combined total number of visitors to Wellington Botanic Garden and Ōtari-Wilton's Bush reached 1.3 million annually. In 2025, it was stated that there were around 238,000 visitors to the Lady Norwood Rose Garden, Begonia House and café annually.

== Access ==
The main entrance to the Botanic Garden is the Founders Entrance on Glenmore Street, which leads past formal flower beds to the duck pond. As of 2025, a public bus stops outside this entrance. The Centennial Entrance near the Founders Entrance provides vehicle and pedestrian access from Glenmore Street to the Lady Norwood Rose Garden, and a path from Bolton Street Cemetery past Anderson Park also leads to the rose garden. Further up Glenmore Street from the Founders Entrance are the Pipitea Entrance and West Entrance, which lead to the Puriri Lawn and Magpie Lawn. Three more pedestrian entrances provide access from the south, at Glen Road, Mariri Road and Boundary Road.

At the top of the hill, the Cable Car Entrance gives access from the top of the cable car route. The Wellington Cable Car runs between the top of the Botanic Garden and Lambton Quay in Wellington's central business district. A wide paved path provides a popular downhill route through the garden, taking about 30 minutes to walk from the Cable Car Entrance to the Founders Entrance.

== Observatories ==
In the south-east part of the Botanic Garden near the cable car station and museum are several observatories. The Carter Observatory (aka Space Place) is owned and managed by Wellington City Council, while the Dominion Observatory, Thomas King Observatory, and MetService building form the Observatory Reserve, owned by the government and managed by the Department of Conservation. Wellington City Council maintains the grounds around these buildings to ensure they are in keeping with the rest of the garden, although they are not officially covered by the Botanic Garden management plan.

== Awards and recognition ==
Wellington Botanic Garden is classified as five-star (a Garden of National Significance), by the New Zealand Gardens Trust. In 2004 it was listed as a historic area by Heritage New Zealand.

== Gallery ==
Wellington Botanic Gardens

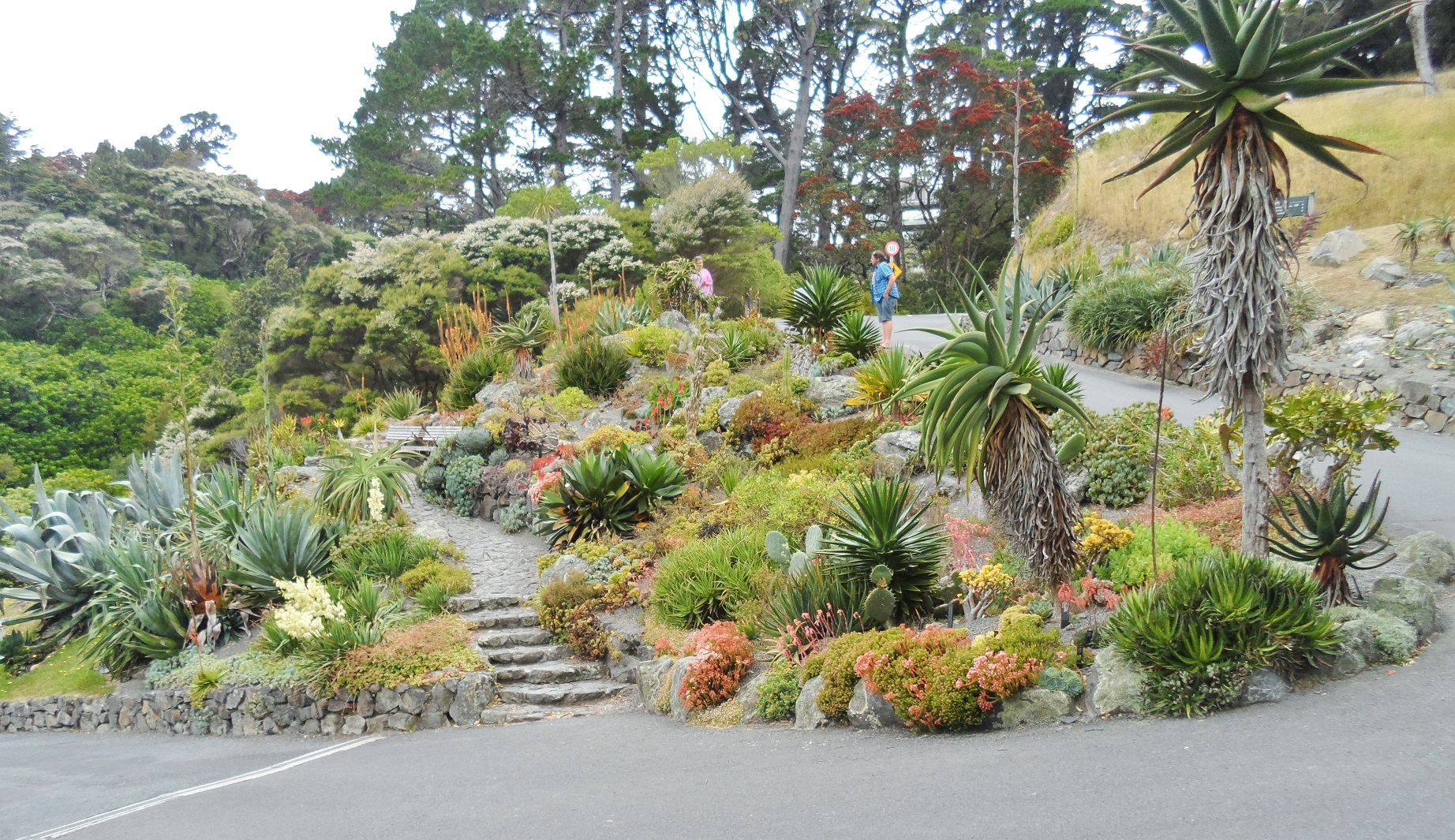
Part of cacti and succulents garden

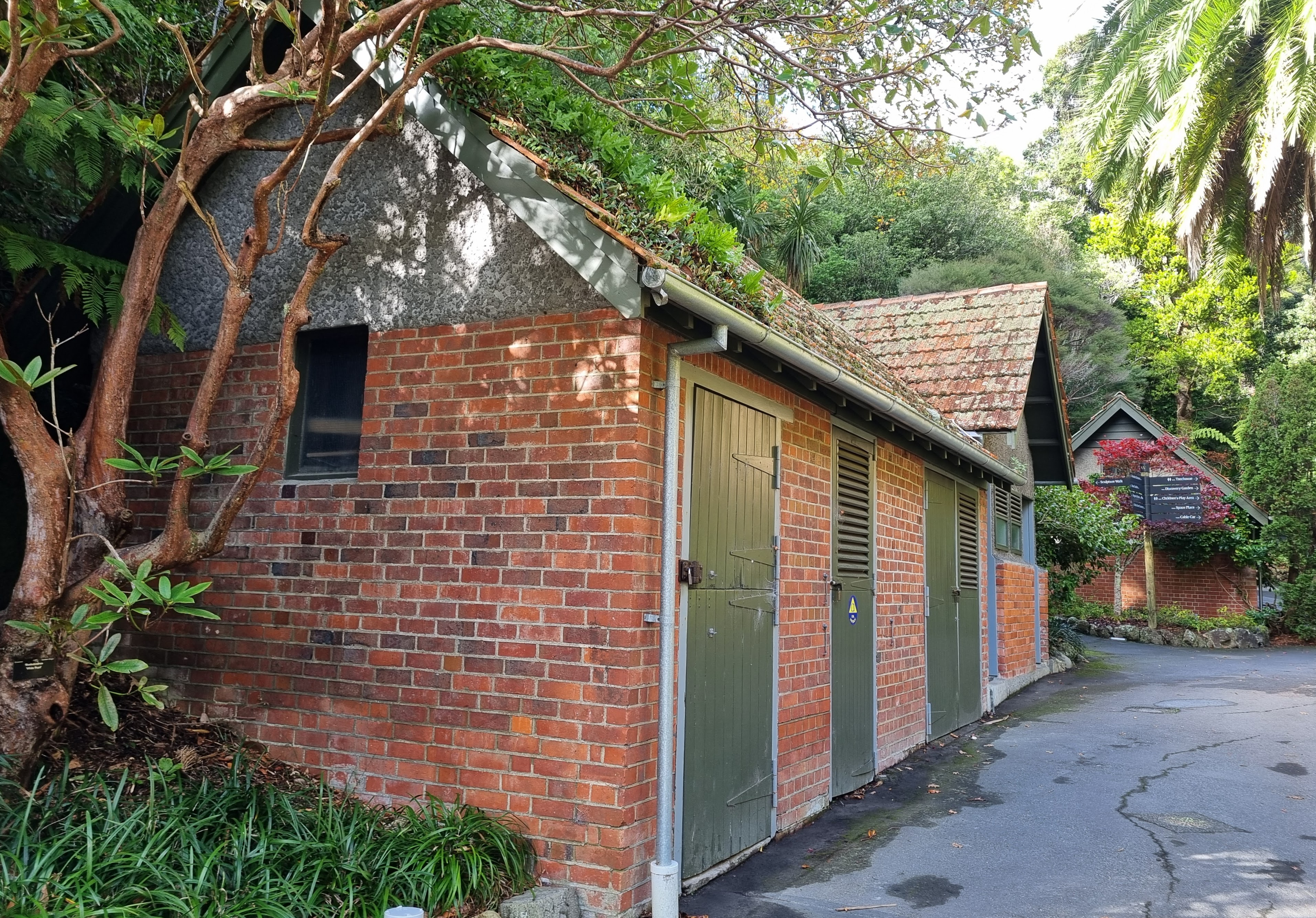
Historic stables in the garden

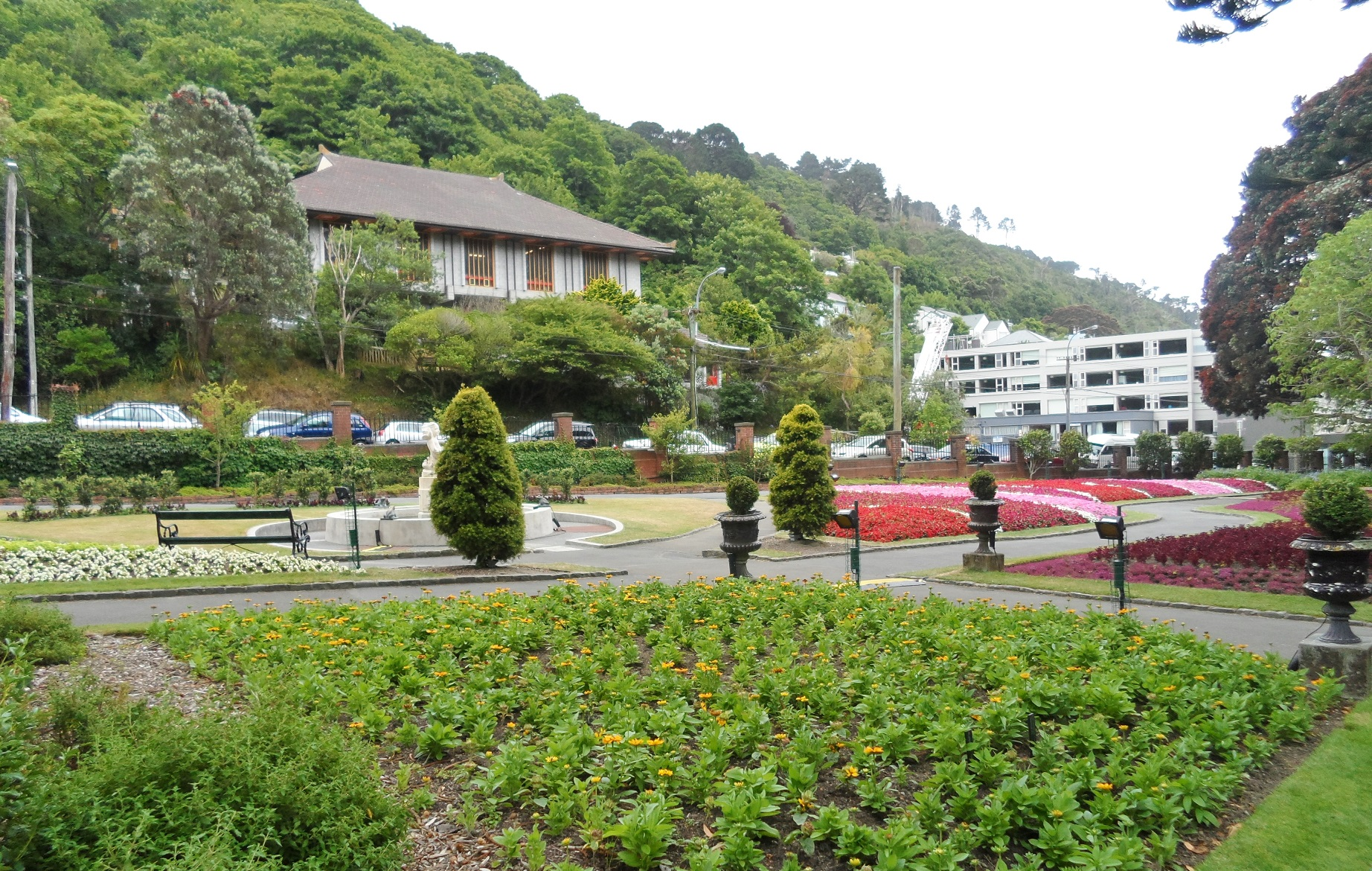
Part of Main Garden and floral displays

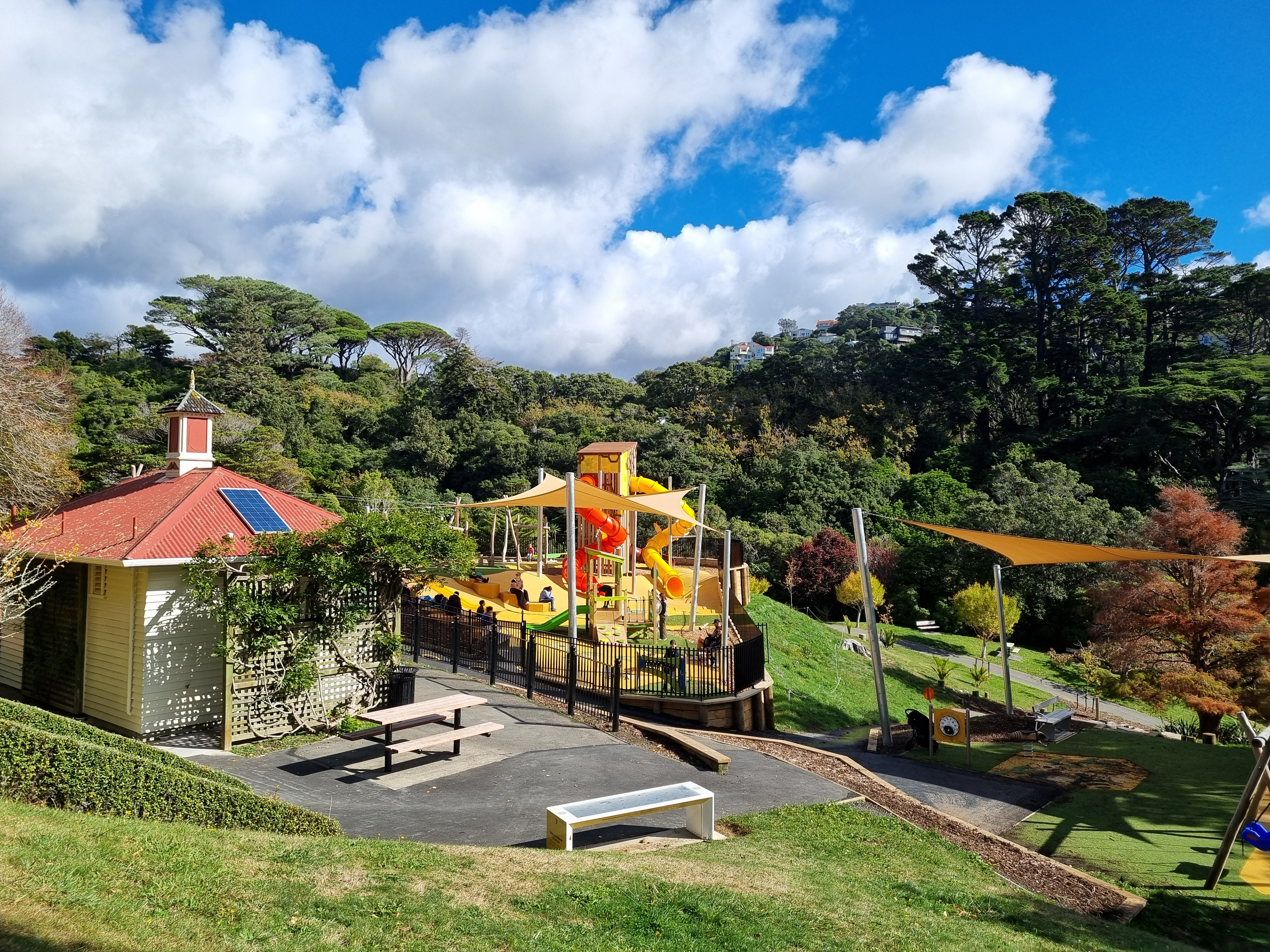
The playground, 2024

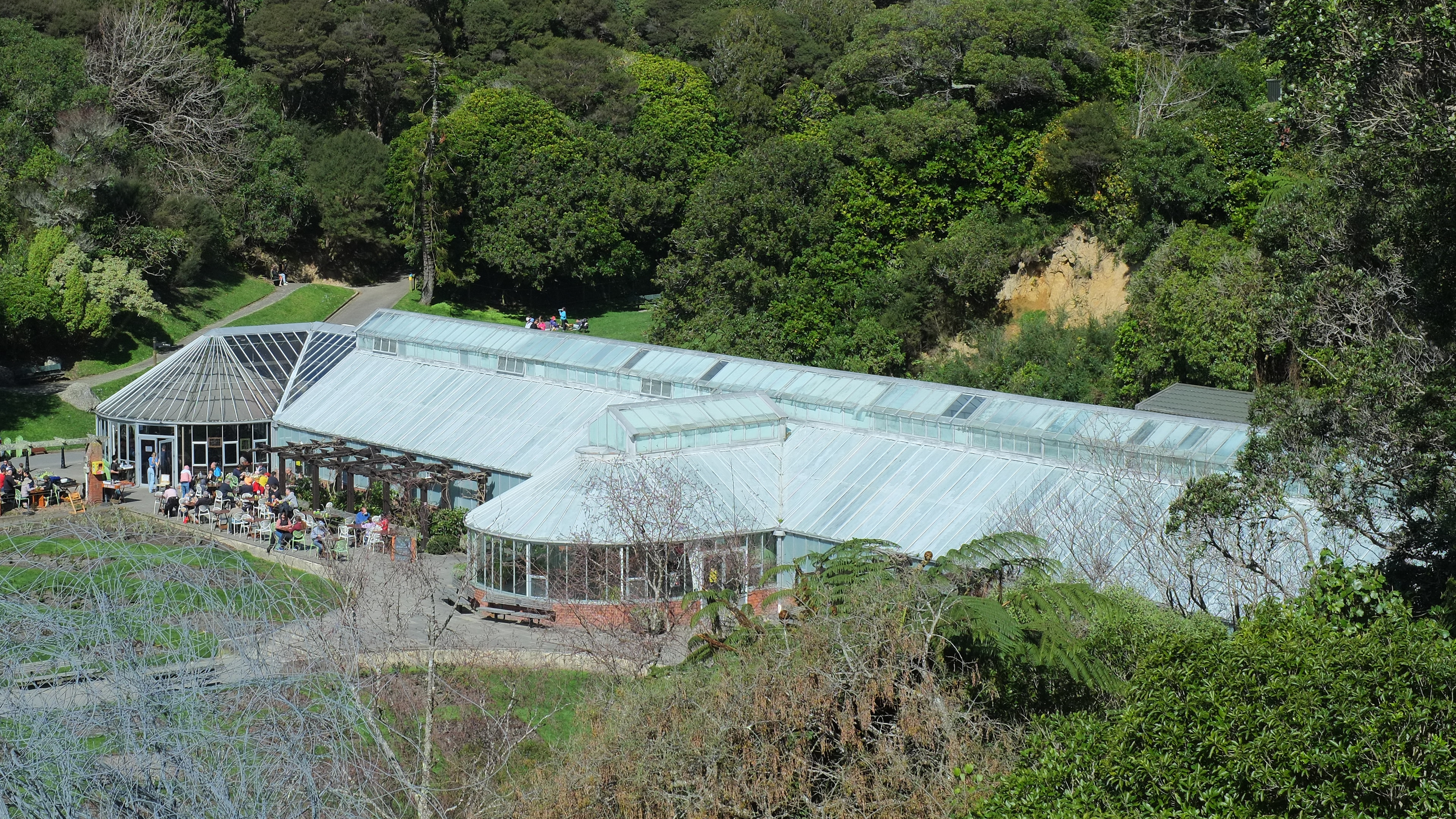
Begonia House

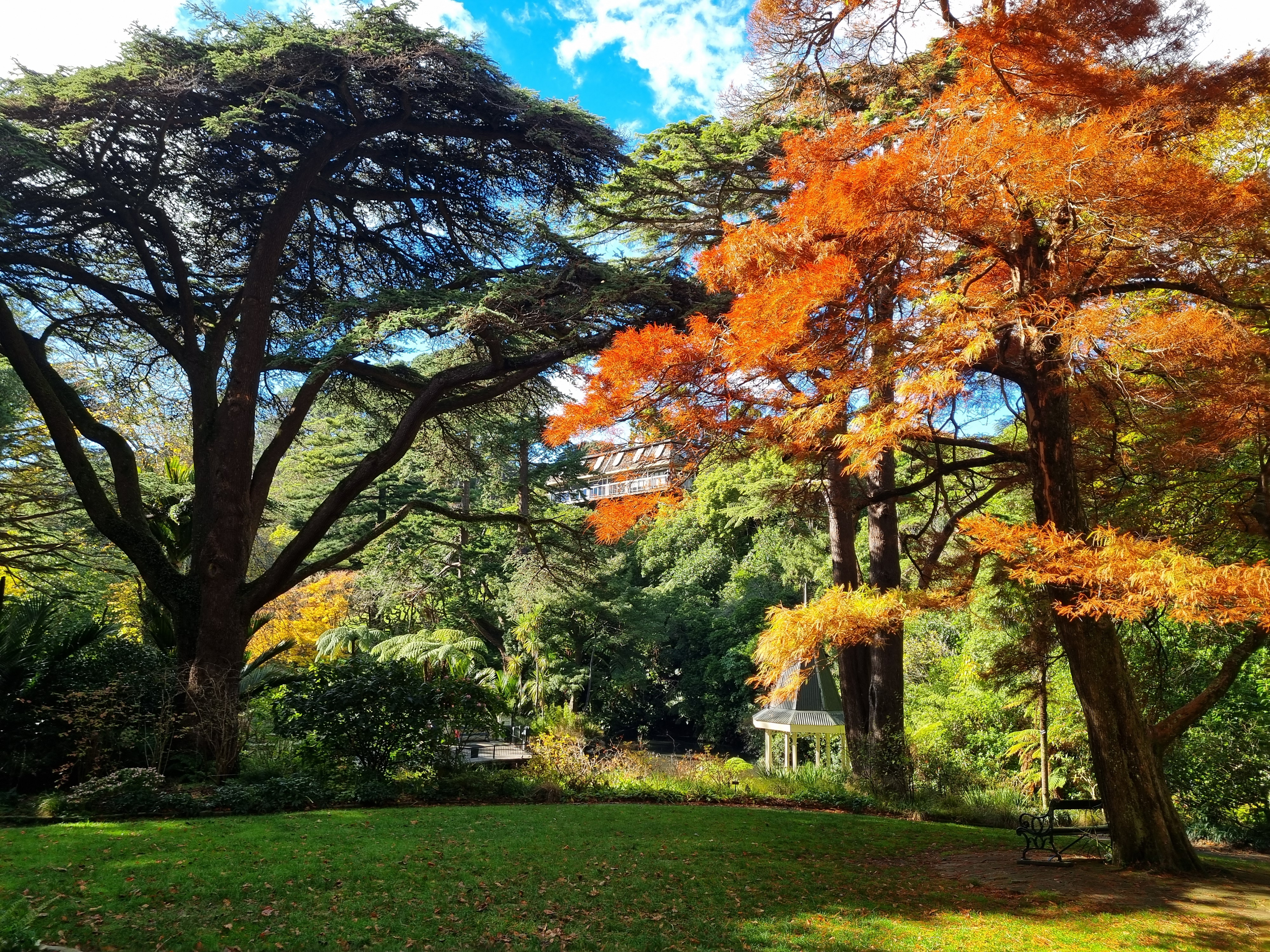
Garden view looking toward duck pond and Treehouse

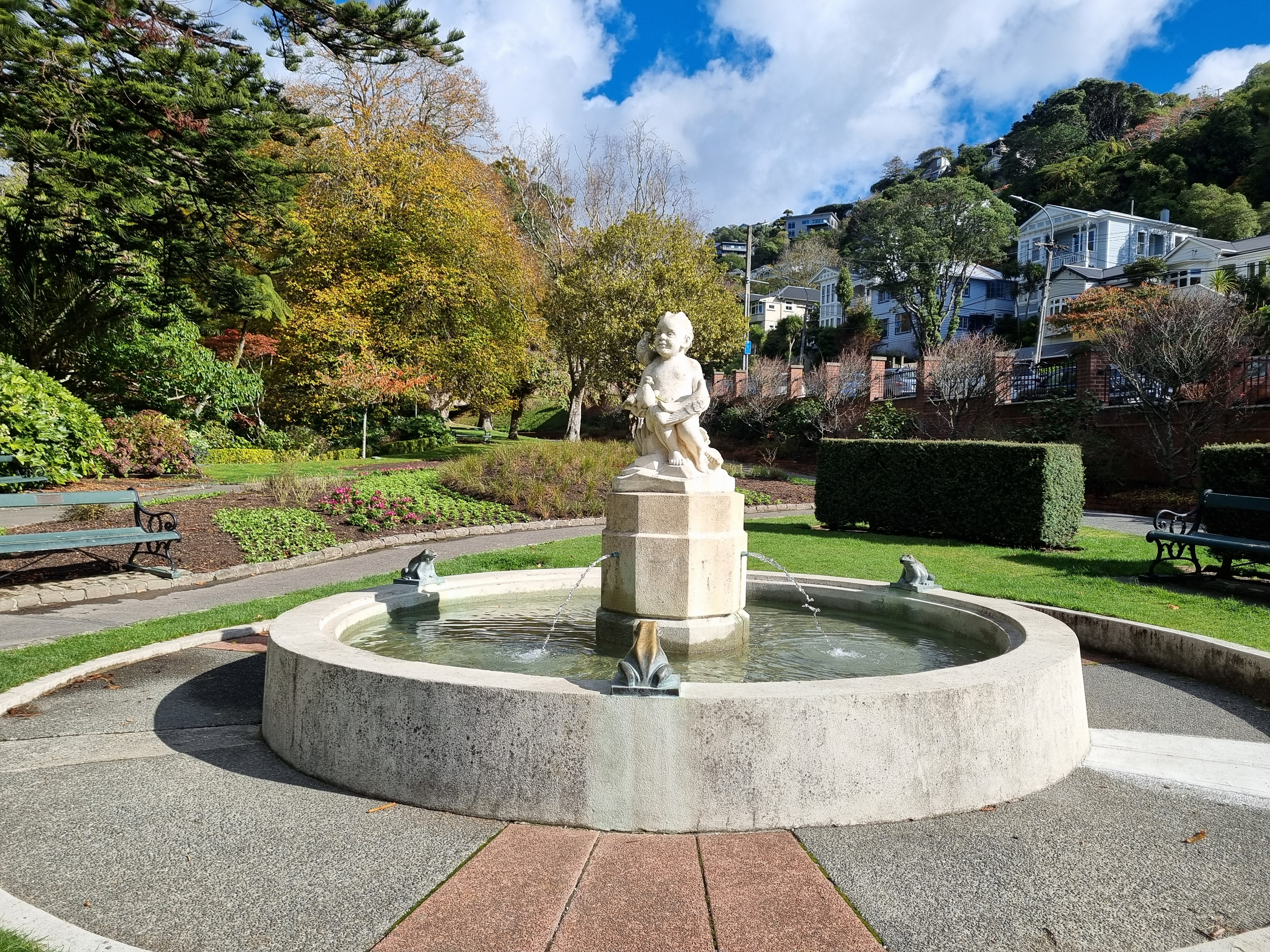
Joy Fountain, completed 1946

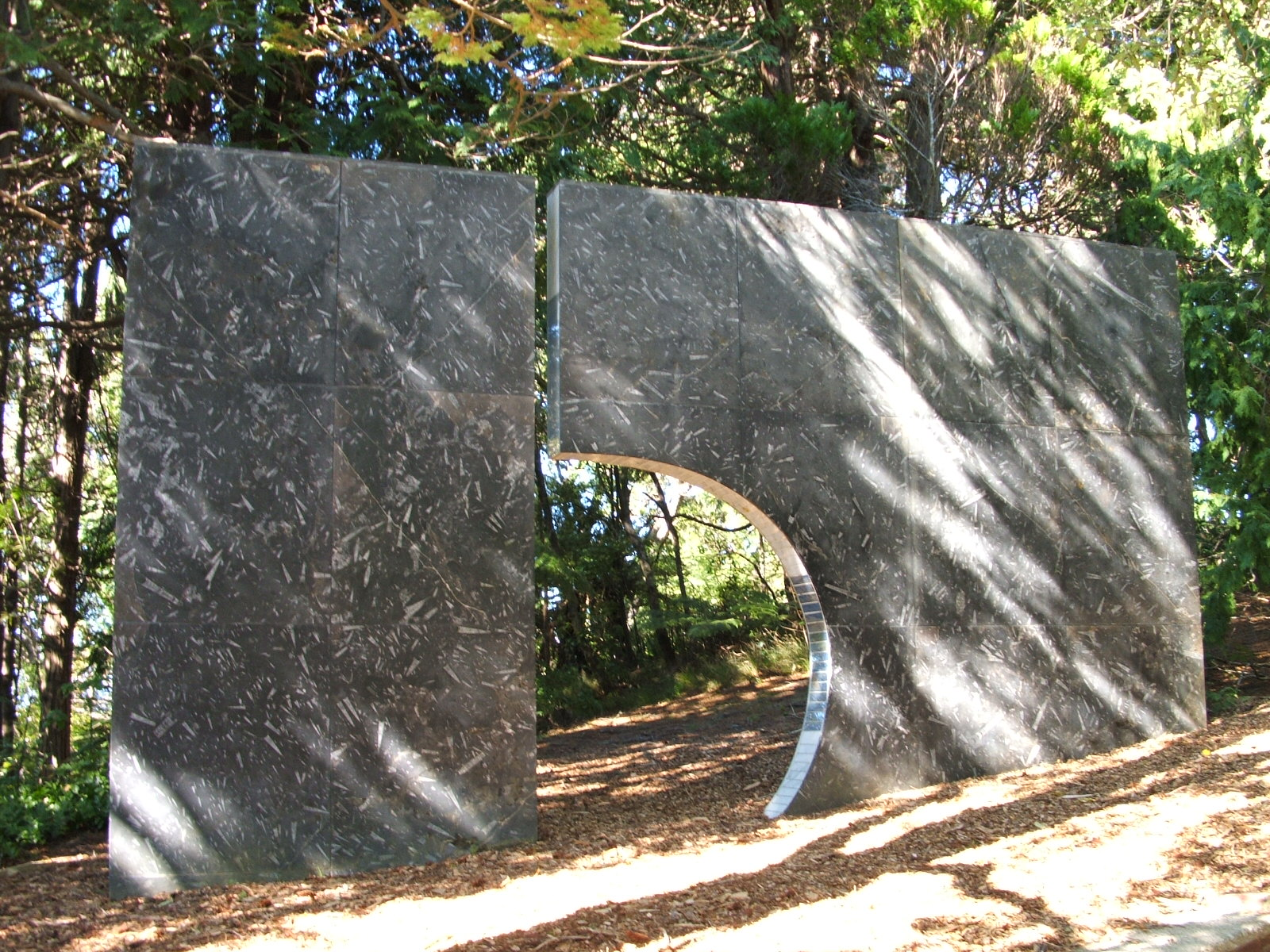
Rudderstone, by Dennis O'Connor

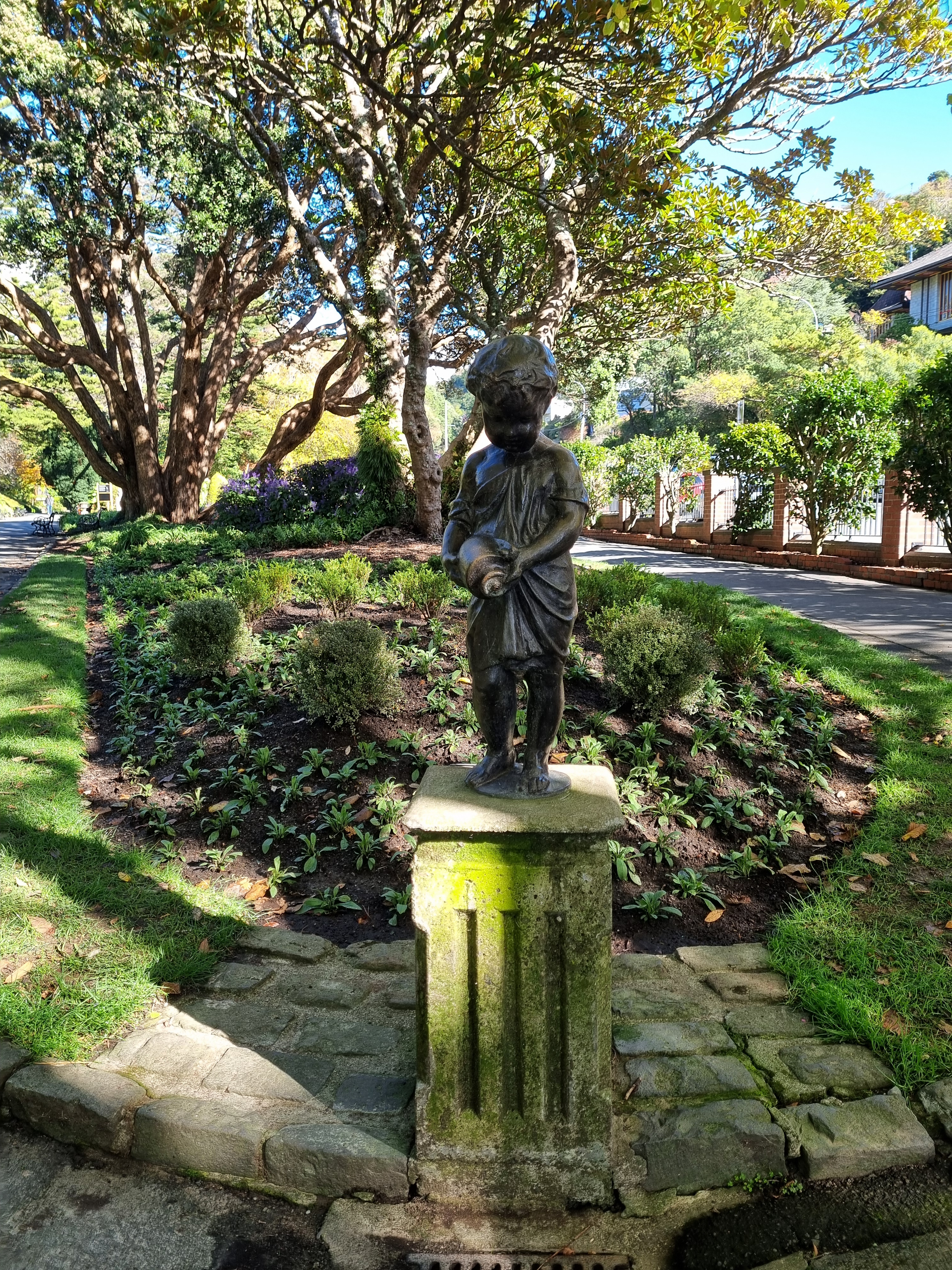
Statue at the main entrance

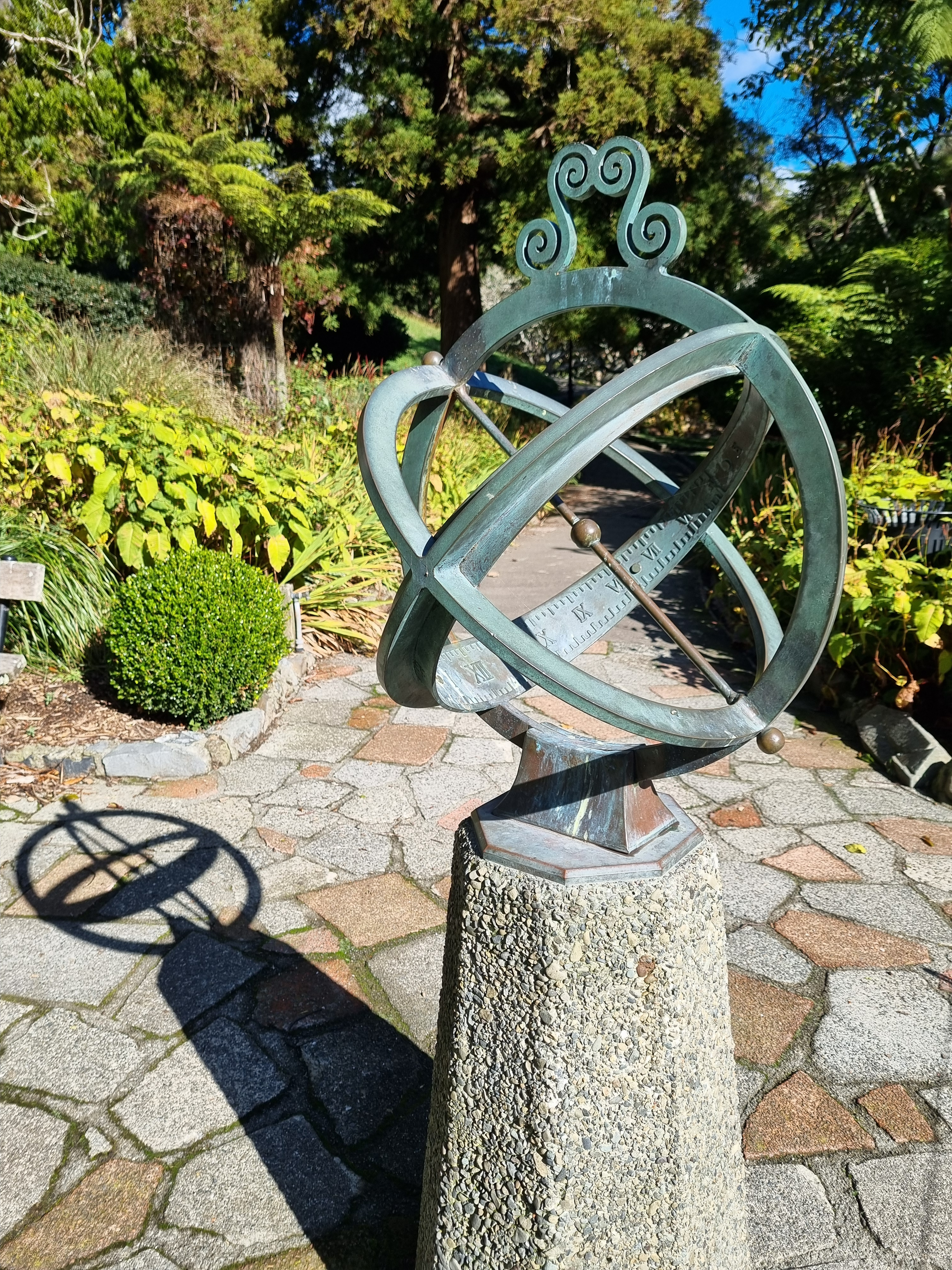
Centennial sundial, celebrating 100 years of council management of the garden

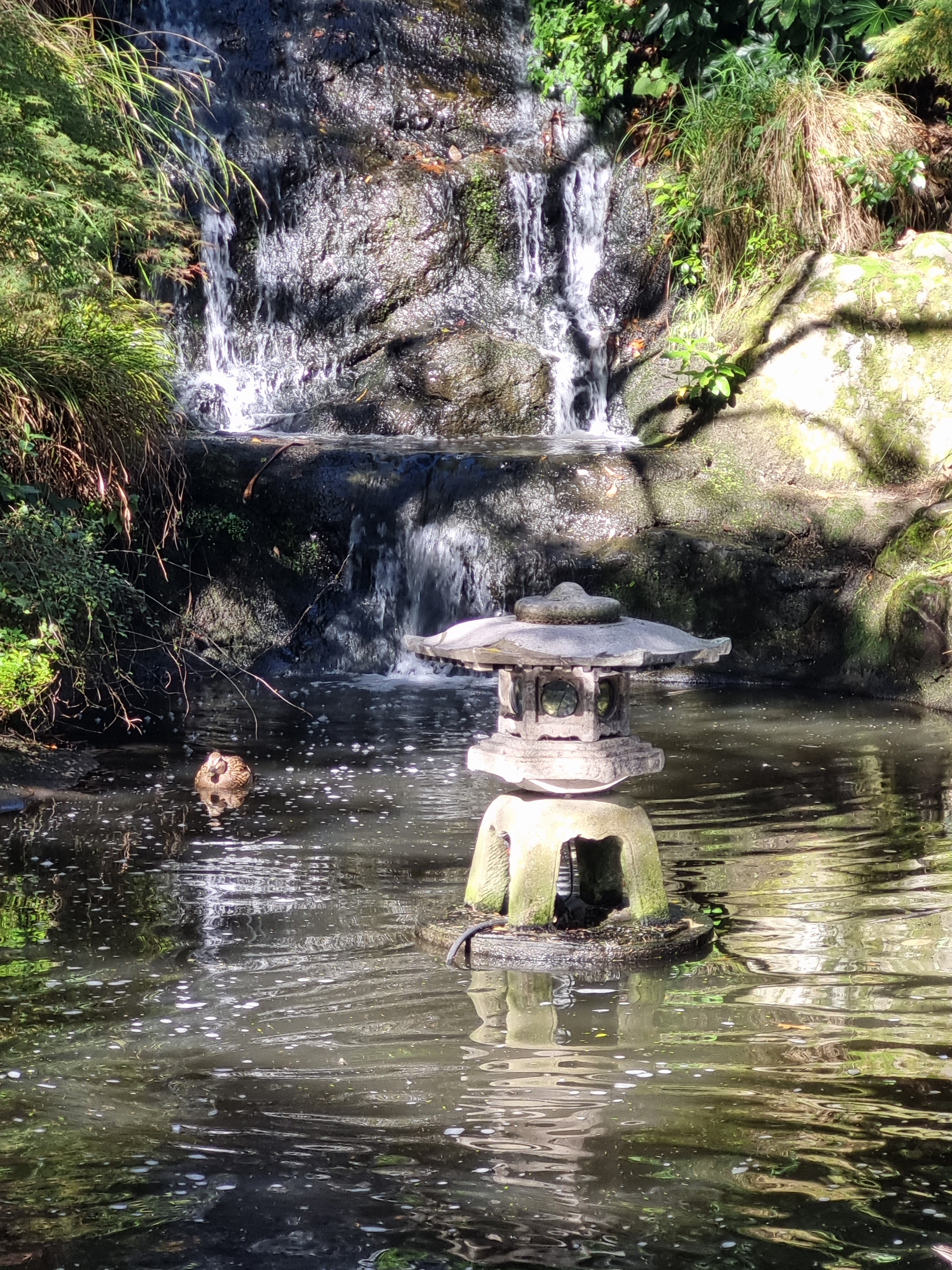
Peace Lantern near the rose garden

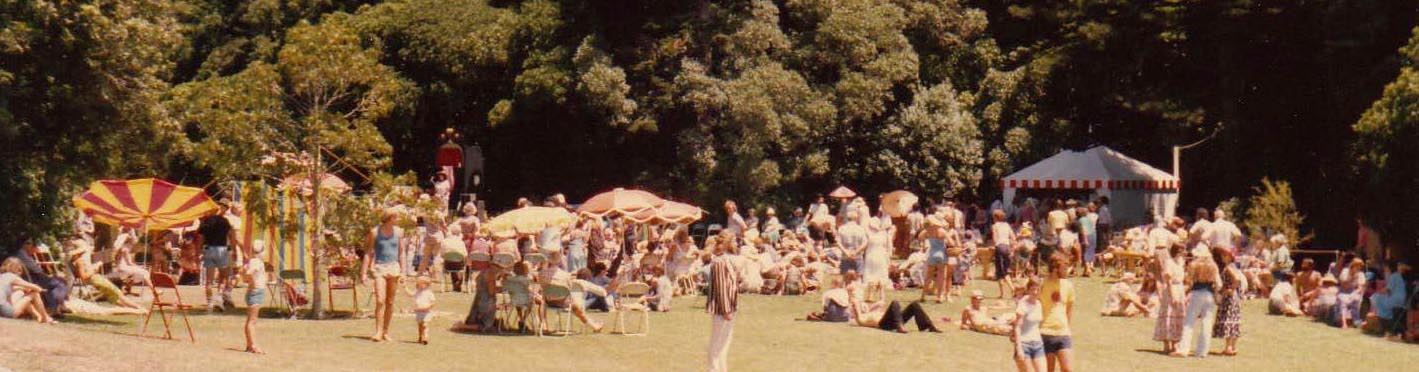
Summer event in the Dell in 1979

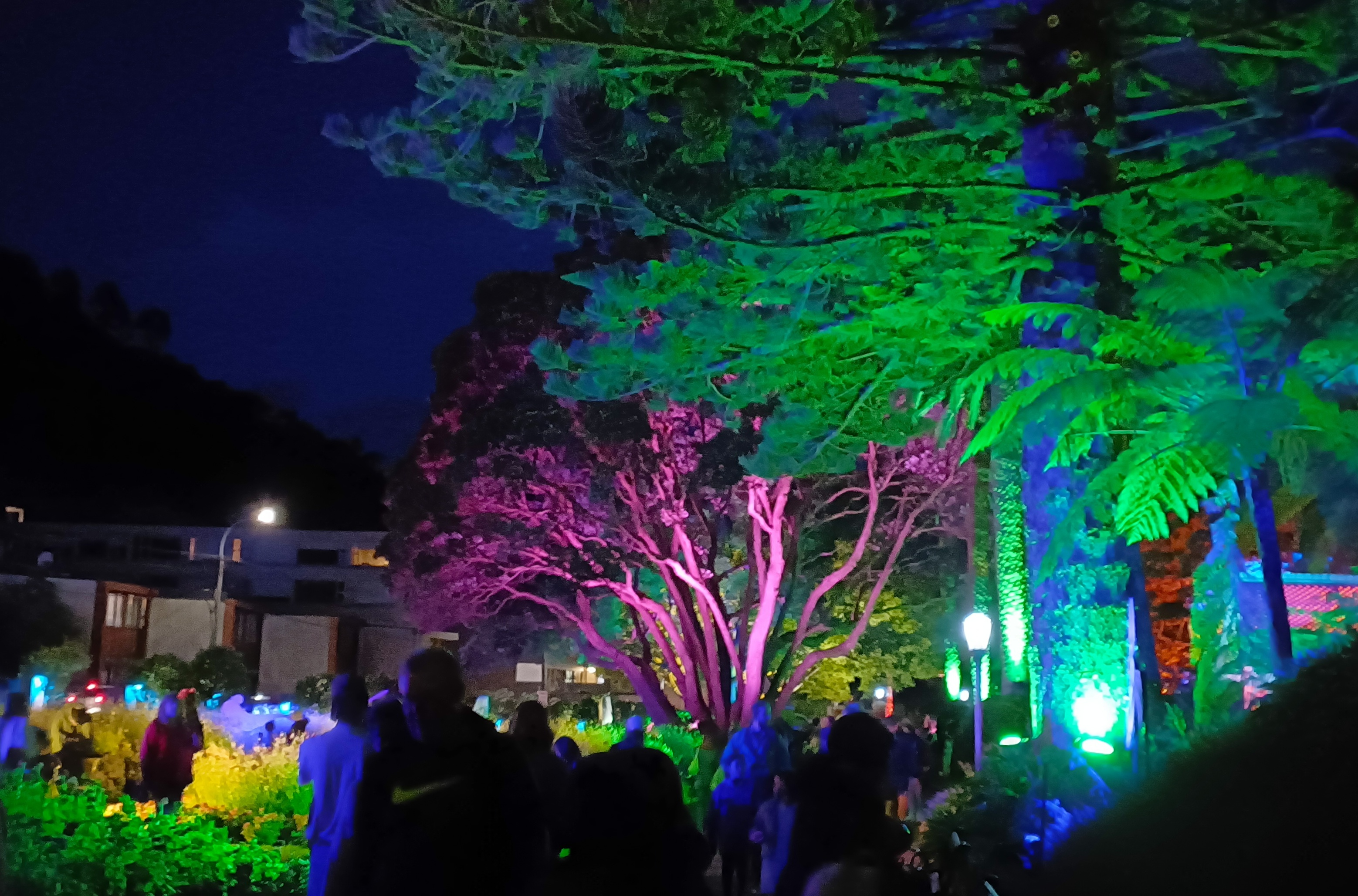
Light show at Gardens Magic

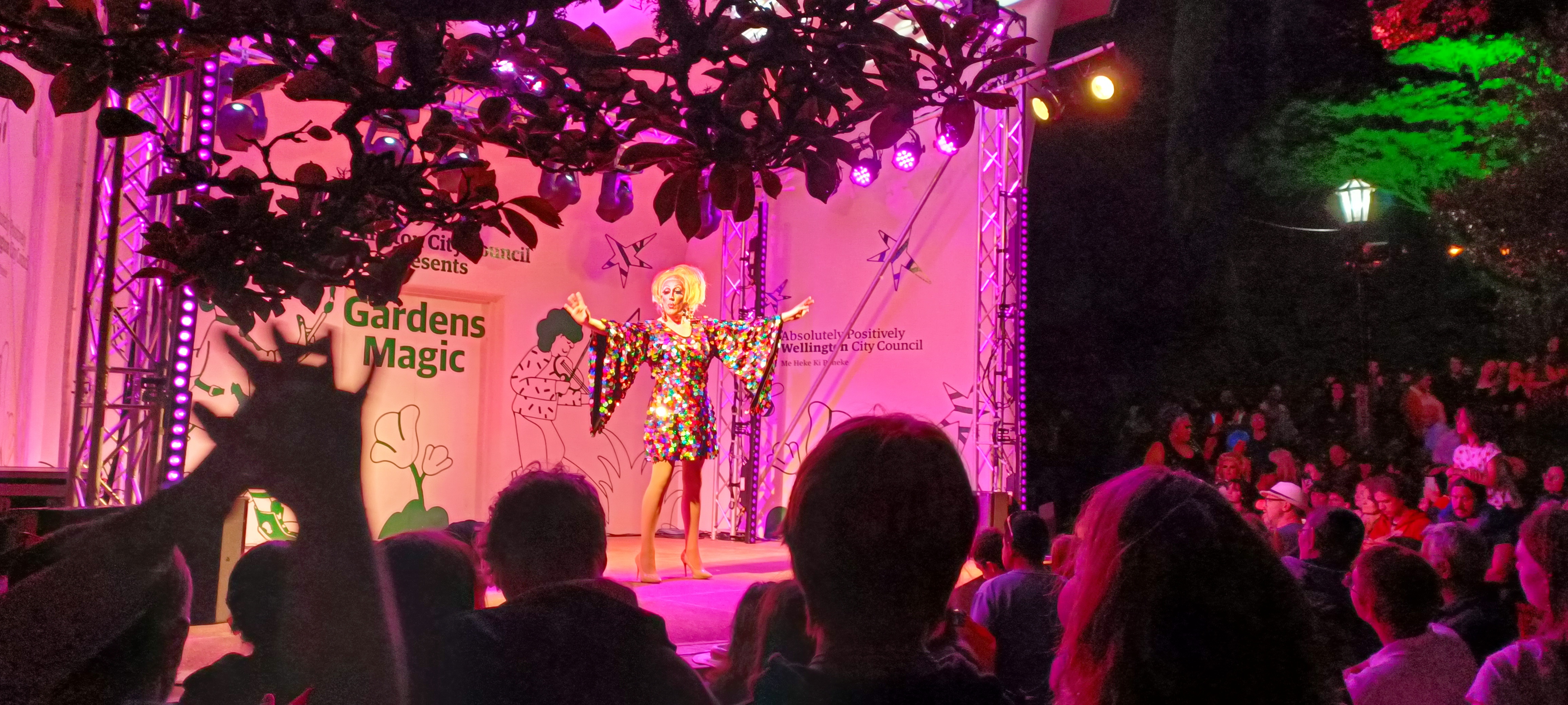
Concert, Gardens Magic
