= Timothy Hyde =

- Corporate MC, Magician & Writer
- Born: Wellington, New Zealand
- Website: timothyhyde.com

Timothy Hyde is an Australia-based magician, born in New Zealand.

== Early life and education ==
Timothy Hyde was born in Wellington, New Zealand.

While training as a primary school teacher at Wellington Teachers College (1974–1976), he also appeared in numerous productions at Wellington's Unity Theatre, Downstage Theatre and helped establish the Wellington Children's Theatre Co-op.

== Career ==
After two years teaching Hyde began a full-time career as a performer, joining the experimental Chameleon Theatre Group, later known as Chameleon Circus. They toured extensively throughout New Zealand with support from the Department of Internal Affairs, appearing at universities, prisons and arts festivals.

Hyde moved to Sydney in 1980, where he undertook busking for three years, before establishing himself as a regular at Sydney's Comedy Store and building a career in both family and corporate entertainment together with his wife Lynda. His family entertainment credits include being the first magician to sign a long-term contract as resident illusionists at the largest theme park in the Southern Hemisphere – Australia's Wonderland. He also performed seasons for Warner Brothers and at Sega World Sydney. In 1992 and 1993 he produced the entertainment program at the Sydney Royal Easter Show's prestigious Colgate Stage.

Hyde was often a support act for international acts visiting Australia and toured extensively with James Taylor, KC and the Sunshine Band, The Nolans, Demis Roussos, Gloria Loring, Johnnie Ray and with locals Marcia Hines, Rodney Rude, Col Elliot and Joe Perrone.

He has appeared on the cover of many leading industry journals including Australian Magic Monthly, Genii Journal & Magicana magazines.

In 1999 he set up the MagicCoach project, coaching other magicians worldwide and publishing both books and online newsletters. This newsletter was one of the first regular online magic marketing newsletters, with guest contributors including – Mac King, James Randi and Billy McComb and a subscriber base of over 2000. He has a number of publications for performers.

Since 2000 he has worked mainly in the corporate area, both as an entertainer, speaker and Master of Ceremonies. In 2006, he was awarded the Walter Dickman Award by the National Speakers Association of Australia for services to the speaking industry and the community. He has been engaged by the National Speakers Association of Australia to be Master of Ceremonies at their own convention from 2003 – 2009. and at the NSA (USA) convention. His blending of magic and being an MC has taken him around the world, presenting in Australia, New Zealand, Hawaii, South Africa, Cambodia, USA and Hong Kong.

In 2011 he set up an online training business and YouTube channel ExpertMC.com for people wanting to become better MC's or to create a business around the skill.

He has also appeared as a headline entertainer on luxury cruise ships. Appearances included Cunard's Queen Mary 2, Crystal Symphony, Silversea Cruises's Cloud & Shadow, and multiple contracts on Princess, P&O Australia & P&O UK. He retired from cruise ship performance in 2018 to concentrate on managing his wife's art career.
