= Project Employment Programme =

The Project Employment Programme (PEP) or PEP scheme was set up by the Department of Labour in New Zealand 'to give subsidised, short-term public sector employment for job seekers'. It began in August 1980 and mostly finished in August 1986. At its peak there were more than 50,000 people employed. People were paid a full time wage just above the minimum.

== Background ==
The PEP scheme came after the TEP scheme, which was the Temporary Employment Programme that started in 1977 and ceased in 1980. This was part of several government employment initiatives including the Students' Community Work Scheme.

Parekura Horomia (a Department of Labour Supervisor) led work gangs throughout the East Coast on a variety of community enhancement projects ranging from chopping and providing firewood for older people to marae renovation projects. (Wira Gardiner, 2014)

The employment schemes employed people in the arts, many of whom went on to successful careers.

In Wellington the Summer '79 programme led to Summer City which employed over 100 artists till 1987. Fourteen Artists' Co-op employees worked to renovate an empty Dalgety wool store in Wellington creating an arts centre and also contributed drawing, performances and music to Summer '79.

In Christchurch the PEP scheme it enabled the development of the Free Theatre Group in Christchurch. Film and theatre people Miranda Harcourt, Colin McColl, Phillipa Boyens and Juliet Dowling (producer of The Unlikely Pilgrimage of Harold Fry 2023) all were employed or involved as they were starting out on a PEP scheme.

A summer performance was programmed for musicians Shona Laing and Andy Drey in 1983 in Wellington paid through the PEP scheme. In Whangaruru carver Wallace Hetaraka passed on carving skills learnt from Hōne Taiapa at the New Zealand Māori Arts and Crafts Institute (Rotorua) in 1983 when he supervised three carvers under the PEP scheme.

Academic Martin O'Connor identified the 'ideological function of PEP' as being used by the government to present information about employment.
