= Cardinal McKeefry Catholic Primary School =

Defunct Catholic primary school in Wellington, New Zealand

Cardinal McKeefry School
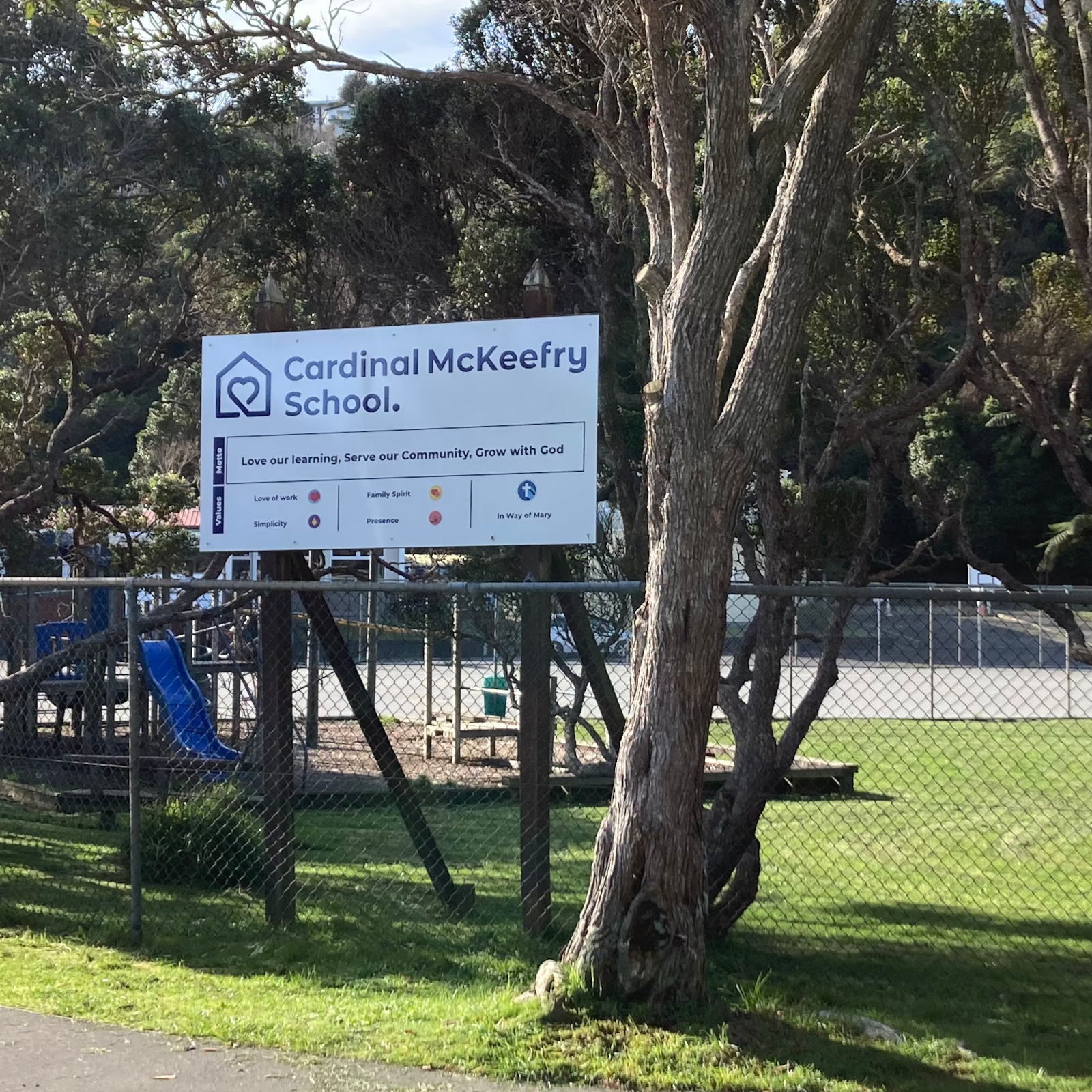

Location
- 66 Albemarle Road, Northland, Wellington 6012, New Zealand; 41.275843°S 174.756973°E

Information
- Type: Catholic Integrated Primary & Intermediate School for girls and boys from Year 1 – Year 8
- Motto: safe, happy, caring, creative & equitable
- Established: 1970; 56 years ago
- Closed: 2025
- Principal: Satvinder Bains (Acting Principal)
- Enrolment: (July 2026)
- Socio-economic decile: 10Z

Cardinal McKeefry School, originally Marist Brothers' Thorndon, was a Catholic primary and intermediate school for girls and boys catering from Year 1 to Year 8 (5 to 13 years old). The school traced its origins to the Marist Brothers' first school opened in New Zealand in 1876. It was opened in 1970 by Cardinal Peter McKeefry and named after him. It closed at the end of 2025.

== Location ==
Cardinal McKeefry was located in Wellington New Zealand, in the city's western suburbs. It was a 9-minute drive from the Wellington CBD, and close to the suburbs of Karori, Kelburn, Northland, Wilton, Wadestown and Ngaio. Students from further afield also attended.

== History ==
The school succeeded the first New Zealand Marist Brothers' School which commenced in Boulcott Street in 1876. That school was relocated to Hawkestone Street in 1911 and as Marist Thorndon offered education for boys from Year 4 – Year 8 (i.e. generally boys aged from 9 to 12). The school shifted in stages to its final site when the Hawkestone St site was taken under the Public Works Act 1928 for the Wellington Urban Motorway. The school was opened in 1970 by Cardinal McKeefry and was named after him. In August 1978 Bishop Owen Snedden, Auxiliary Bishop of Wellington and Episcopal Vicar for Education, signed the integration agreement for Cardinal McKeefry Catholic Primary School and, with St Bernard's School, Brooklyn, it became one of the first two schools to be integrated into the State education system under the Private Schools Conditional Integration Act 1975. The school ceased to be a boys-only, years 4 to 8 school and became a State-Integrated, full primary, co-educational, school. Cardinal McKeefry Catholic Primary School closed permanently on 15 December 2025.

== School activities ==
Students took part in a range of activities within the school, Wellington City and further afield. These included singing and choral festivals, arts and technology classes, cultural activities and regional sporting events. Regular educational trips and visits took place to venues such as the Museum of New Zealand 'Te Papa' in downtown Wellington, and the nearby Karori Wildlife Sanctuary.

== School size, character and facilities ==
In 2020, the school had 83 students. By November 2024, it only had 17.

The school charter included 'Catholic character' which involved curriculum covering spirituality, concepts of inclusiveness and respect for diversity.

An after school care service operated. Grass playing fields and hard surface outdoor spaces were present on-site. Children walked or caught a bus to and from school, and a drop off area was within the school grounds for those who arrived by car.
