= Beatrice Tinsley =

New Zealand astronomer (1941–1981)

- Born: 27 January 1941; Chester, England
- Died: 23 March 1981 (aged 40); New Haven, Connecticut, U.S.
- Education: University of Canterbury; University of Texas at Austin
- Known for: Evolution of galaxies
- Spouse: Brian Tinsley (m. 1961; div. 1974)
- Parents: Edward Hill (father); Jean Hill (mother)
- Awards: AAS Annie J. Cannon Award in Astronomy (1974)
- Scientific career
- Fields: Astronomy
- Workplaces: Yale University
- Thesis: Evolution of galaxies and its significance for cosmology

Beatrice Muriel Hill Tinsley (27 January 1941 – 23 March 1981) was a British-born New Zealand astronomer and cosmologist, and the first female professor of astronomy at Yale University, whose research made fundamental contributions to the astronomical understanding of how galaxies evolve, grow and die.

== Life ==
Beatrice Hill was born 1941 in Chester, England, as the middle of three daughters of Jean and Edward Hill. The family emigrated to New Zealand following World War II, first living in Christchurch, and then for a longer time in New Plymouth, where her father was a clergyman, Moral Re-Armer, and later became the mayor (1953–56).

While studying in Christchurch, she married physicist and university classmate Brian Tinsley, not knowing that this would prevent her from working at the university while he was employed there. Tinsley completed her master's thesis in 1962. They moved in 1963 to the United States, to Dallas, Texas, where Brian was hired by the Southwest Center for Advanced Studies (now the University of Texas at Dallas). However, she was said to have found the situation "stultifying", and had once caused a controversy by refusing to follow the custom of hosting a faculty tea. In 1964, she enrolled at UT-Austin, where she was the only woman in the astronomy programme and where she would later publish her groundbreaking research.

Despite receiving recognition for her work, Tinsley was unable to find a permanent academic position. In 1974, after years of attempting to balance home, family and two commuting careers, she left her husband and two adopted children to take a position as assistant professor at Yale. On 1 July 1978 she was appointed a professor of astronomy at Yale, becoming the first woman to hold the position. She worked at Yale until her death from melanoma in the Yale Infirmary in 1981.

== Professional activity ==
Tinsley completed pioneering theoretical studies of how populations of stars age and affect the observable qualities of galaxies. She also collaborated on basic research into models investigating whether the universe is closed or open. Her galaxy models led to the first approximation of what protogalaxies should look like.

In 1974 she received the American Astronomical Society's Annie J. Cannon Award in Astronomy, awarded for "outstanding research and promise for future research by a postdoctoral woman researcher", in recognition of her work on galaxy evolution.

In 1977, Tinsley, with Richard Larson of Yale, organised a conference on 'The Evolution of Galaxies and Stellar Populations'.

Shortly after, in 1978, she became the first female professor of astronomy at Yale University. Her last scientific paper, submitted to The Astrophysical Journal ten days before her death, was published posthumously that November, without revision. (Note: The editor's note: "Deceased on 1981 March 23, thus ending prematurely a distinguished career. The text of this last paper was not revised, although Michele Kaufman kindly added some clarifying definitions and comments.")

== Death ==
Tinsley died of melanoma on 23 March 1981, at the age of 40. Her ashes are buried at Grove Street Cemetery in New Haven, Connecticut, which is surrounded by the Yale University campus.

== Tributes ==
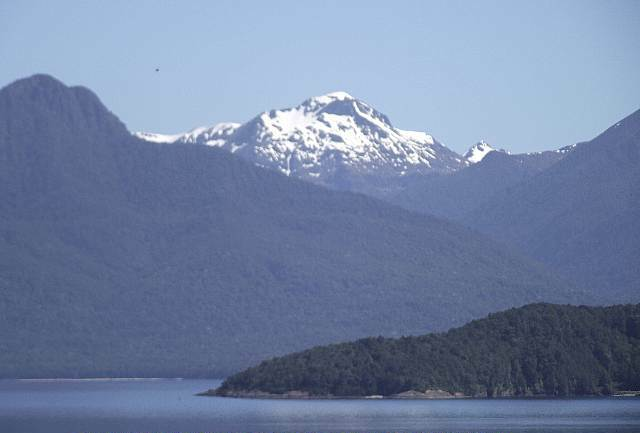
Mount Tinsley from the Town of Manapouri

In 1986 the American Astronomical Society established the Beatrice M. Tinsley Prize, which recognises "an outstanding research contribution to astronomy or astrophysics, of an exceptionally creative or innovative character." It is the only major award created by an American scientific society which honours a woman scientist. The award is not made with restriction on a candidate's citizenship or country of residence.

The main-belt asteroid 3087 Beatrice Tinsley, discovered in 1981 at Mt John University Observatory near Tekapo, is also named after her.

The University of Texas at Austin established from endowment in 1989 the Beatrice M. Tinsley Centennial Visiting Professorship, where a distinguished mid-career or senior professor is invited to visit for up to a semester. In 2007 they added the Tinsley Scholars, awards for younger researchers to briefly visit Austin.

In 2005, the Circa Theatre in Wellington produced a play called Bright Star, about the life of Beatrice Tinsley. The Wellington Astronomical Society held telescope viewing sessions outside the theatre, on the wharf next to the Te Papa Museum.

In December 2010 the New Zealand Geographic Board officially named a mountain in Fiordland's Kepler Mountains (which are named for astronomer Johannes Kepler) as Mt Tinsley.

The Royal Astronomical Society of New Zealand established the Beatrice Hill Tinsley Lectures in 2012.

Beatrice Tinsley Crescent in Rosedale, on Auckland's North Shore, is named for her.

On 27 January 2016, the 75th anniversary of her birth, Google published a Doodle to honour her work. In the same year, the New Zealand Association of Scientists renamed the Research Medal the Hill Tinsley Medal in Tinsley's honour. In 2017, Tinsley was one of the Royal Society Te Apārangi's "150 women in 150 words", celebrating women's contribution to knowledge in New Zealand.

Her obituary was published by The New York Times several decades later on 18 July 2018, in their "Overlooked" project, which aims to note "the stories of remarkable people whose deaths went unreported in The Times".

In 2018, the Yale Society of Physics Students began an inaugural prize lecture in honour of Tinsley.

A 2019 $1.20 New Zealand postage stamp in a series of "New Zealand Space Pioneers" honours her.

The University of Canterbury College of Science named their staff and postgraduate building after Tinsley, which was opened in October 2019 by the Honourable Dr Megan Woods, Vice-Chancellor Cheryl de la Rey, and Pro-Vice Chancellor of Science Professor Wendy Lawson. The building uses Pres-Lam technology developed at the university.

The final track on the 2022 Forenzics album Shades and Echoes, "Autumn", is credited "Words by NZ astronomer Beatrice Hill Tinsley – adapted with permission by T. Finn".

== Selected publications ==
- "An accelerating universe". 1975. Nature 257: 454–457 (9 October 1975); doi:10.1038/257454a0
- "Correlation of the Dark Mass in Galaxies with Hubble type". 1981. Royal Astronomical Society, Monthly Notices. vol. 194, p. 63–75
- "Relations between Nucleosynthesis Rates and the Metal Abundance". 1980. Astronomy and Astrophysics. vol. 89, no. 1–2, p. 246–248
- "Stellar Lifetimes and Abundance Ratios in Chemical Evolution". 1979. Astrophysical Journal. Part 1, vol. 229, p. 1046–1056
- "Colors as Indicators of the Presence of Spiral and Elliptical Components in N Galaxies". 1977. Publications of the Astronomical Society of the Pacific. vol. 89, p. 245–250
- "Surface Brightness Parameters as Tests of Galactic Evolution". 1976. Astrophysical Journal. vol. 209, p. L7–L9
- "The Color-Redshift Relation for Giant Elliptical Galaxies". 1971, Astrophysics and Space Science, Vol. 12, p. 394
