= Brian Tinsley =

Physicist from New Zealand

- Born: Brian Alfred Tinsley; 23 April 1941 (age 85); Wellington, New Zealand
- Education: University of Canterbury
- Spouse: Beatrice Tinsley (m. 1961; div. 1974)
- Scientific career
- Fields: Physics, aeronomy

Brian Alfred Tinsley (born 23 April 1937) is a physicist who for more than 60 years has been actively researching atmospheric physics and space physics. He has been a professor of physics at the University of Texas at Dallas since 1976 and has served many national and international scientific organisations.

== Early life and education ==
Tinsley was born on 23 April 1937 at the Waimarie Private Hospital in Wellington's central suburb of Te Aro, New Zealand. The Tinleys lived at Kaitoke at that time. Edward Hill was his father-in-law. He obtained his PhD from the University of Canterbury in New Zealand in November 1963, for research on optical emissions from the upper atmosphere (airglow and aurorae).

== Career ==
With his wife, Beatrice Tinsley, later to become the first female astronomer at Yale University, he came to Dallas to work at the newly formed Southwest Center for Advanced Studies, which became the University of Texas at Dallas in 1969.

During Tinsley's time at the NSF in the late 1980s he began researching the effects of changes in the sun on weather and climate on the day-to-day, decadal and century timescale. He has been author of more than 40 papers on this topic. He has proposed a mechanism in which the link to the atmosphere is the solar wind (space weather) (as opposed to changes in solar brightness) that affects the downward ionosphere-earth current density (Jz) in the global atmospheric electric circuit.

Tinsley formed the hypothesis that the Jz effects are due to electrical charge deposited on droplets and aerosol particles (notably condensation nuclei and ice-forming nuclei in clouds) that significantly affect scavenging processes and the concentrations of the nuclei. The consequences of this include changes in cloud cover and rates of precipitation, and changes in surface pressure and atmospheric dynamics, as has been observed.

Tinsley, Dr. Gary Burns of the Australian Antarctic Research Division, and Dr. Limin Zhou of the East China Normal University have shown that there are clear correlations between the electric current output of the internal atmospheric generators (thunderstorms) in the global electric circuit and surface pressure at both Antarctic and Arctic sites, fully consistent with the changes due to the solar wind. Thus the work has led to the discovery of an unexpected process in meteorology that has implications for climate. That is that the internal generation of atmospheric electricity, mostly in the tropical regions, affects clouds and meteorological processes all over the globe. Observations of cloud changes in polar regions and models of cloud charging and the effects of charge on cloud microphysics confirm these findings. However, recently, the direct link to polar pressure has been disputed. These new findings show that the previously hypothesized relationship between the solar wind and surface level polar pressure changes are likely just statistical artefacts.

== Private life ==
Tinsley married Beatrice Hill on 13 May 1961 at St Aidan's Church in Wellington's suburb Miramar. Being told that she could not conceive, they first adopted a boy in 1966 from one of Brian's relatives. They adopted a girl in 1968. When his wife became unexpectedly pregnant, she had an abortion. They divorced in 1974, and as she did not want to engage in a legal challenge, their children remained with him.
