= Arthur Hansell =

Arthur Lloyd Hansell (1865–1948) was an Anglican priest in the 20th century, most notably Archdeacon of Wairarapa from 1922 to 1945.

Hansell was educated at Magdalen College, Oxford and Ripon College Cuddesdon; and ordained in 1891. After a curacy in Wantage he held incumbencies at Karori and Lower Hutt.
