= Northland, New Zealand =

Northland, New Zealand may refer to:

- Northland Peninsula
- Northland Region
- Northland (New Zealand electorate)
- Northland, Wellington
