= State-integrated school =

Type of school in New Zealand

In New Zealand, a state-integrated school is a former private school which has integrated into the state education system under the Private Schools Conditional Integration Act 1975, becoming a state school while retaining its special character. State-integrated schools were established by the Third Labour Government in the early 1970s as a response to the near-collapse of the country's then private Catholic school system, which had run into financial difficulties.

As of July 2022, there were 335 state-integrated schools in New Zealand, of which 236 identify as Roman Catholic. (Note: Figures derived from the "New Zealand Schools Pivot Table 1996-2022" spreadsheet available at https://www.educationcounts.govt.nz/statistics/schooling/number-of-schools) They educate approximately 92,482 students, or 11.2% of New Zealand's student population, making them the second-most common type of school in New Zealand behind non-integrated state schools.

== History ==
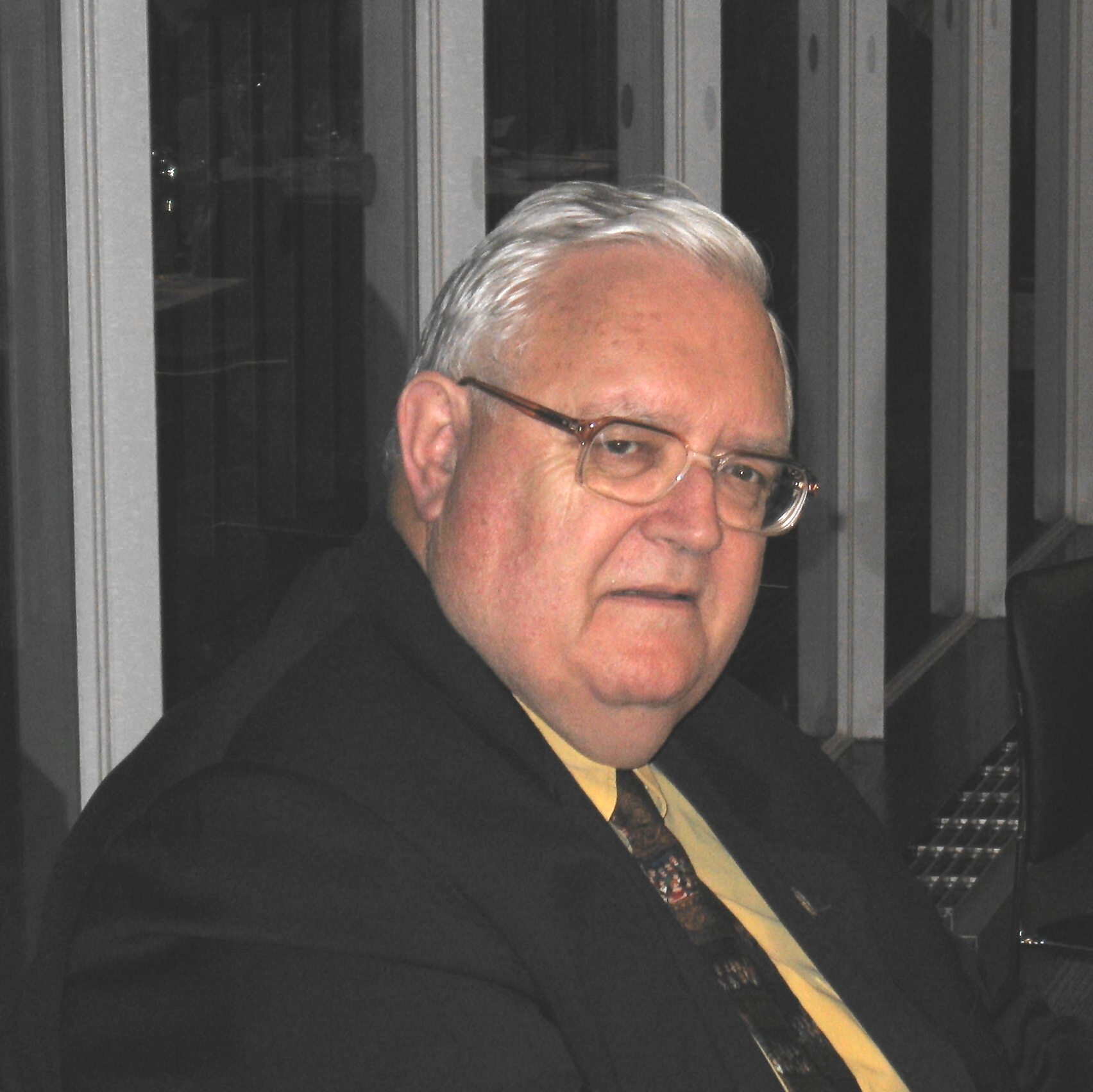
The Right Honourable Jonathan Hunt is credited with the idea of integrating private schools into the state school system

New Zealand's state education system was established in 1877. Prior to then, schools were run by church groups and other private groups. From 1852 until provinces were abolished in 1876, all schools were entitled to receive some financial assistance from provincial governments. Under the Education Act 1877, education became compulsory for all children between 7 and 13 years of age and gave all children between 5 and 15 years of age the entitlement to free and secular education in a state-run school. The secular-education requirement arose from a deadlock between secularist, Catholic, and Protestant MPs over how much and what type of religious influence (if any) should be included in state schools. Ultimately, MPs opted for the safest route by making state education secular. As a result, both Catholic and Protestant churches continued to organise and expand their own private school systems.

After the Second World War, private religious schools had to cope with increasing rolls due to changes in the compulsory school starting and leaving ages (the school leaving age was increased to 15 in 1944; the school starting age was lowered to 6 in 1964) and the post-war baby boom. In addition, private schools had to keep pace with the drive for higher-quality facilities and smaller class sizes in the state sector, while dealing with a teacher shortage and the increasing cost of land, equipment and salaries. The Catholic school system, in particular, had to hire more lay teachers to cope with student numbers – the proportion of lay teachers in the Catholic system increased from 5 percent in 1956 to 38 percent in 1972 – and more lay teachers meant higher salary costs. Catholic parishes were struggling to meet the increasing costs while keeping tuition fees down, and ultimately many of them accrued large amounts of debt or cut costs, causing schools to be run down. By the end of the 1960s, the Catholic school system was facing a financial crisis and was on the brink of collapse.

In November 1972, the Labour Party was elected to government, and Prime Minister Norman Kirk immediately sought a solution to the Catholic school funding crisis. The government determined the state school system would not be able to cope with an influx of students if the Catholic system were to collapse, so sought a way for the state to assist them to keep them open. The idea of integrating private schools into the state system has been credited to MP (and later Speaker of the House) Jonathan Hunt, and after consultation, the Private Schools Conditional Integration Act was drawn up. The Act was passed by Parliament and signed into law on 10 October 1975, and came into force on 16 August 1976.

The first private school to integrate was Wesley College, Pukekohe, in 1977. The first two Catholic schools to integrate were Cardinal McKeefry School and St Bernard's School, both in Wellington, in August 1979. Despite the increasing urgency, it took until 1984 to integrate every Catholic school.

== Features ==
State-integrated schools are established through an integration agreement between the Crown and the proprietors of the private school to be integrated. Each integration agreement sets out the school's particular special character, which is usually a religious or philosophical belief. Of the 335 state-integrated schools, 236 are Catholic schools (i.e. Catholicism is their special character), with the local Catholic diocese or religious institute acting as proprietor. The special characters of the remaining 93 schools include Anglican, Presbyterian, non-denominational Christian, Montessori and Waldorf (Steiner).

Proprietors retain ownership of the school land and buildings, and representatives of the proprietors sit as trustees on the school's board of trustees. The main role of the proprietors is to ensure that the special character of the school is maintained and preserved, and have the authority to address problems if the special character is being compromised.

With several major exceptions relating to their special characters and their proprietors, state-integrated schools are required to operate like their non-integrated counterparts. This includes complying with all National Education Goals and National Administration Guidelines ("NEGs and NAGs") set by the government, having to employ registered teaching staff, and complying with the nationally set school year. State-integrated schools must follow the nationally set curriculum (The New Zealand Curriculum / Te Matautanga o Aotearoa), but they may teach their special character within it. State-integrated schools that have a religious special character are exempt from the religious instruction restrictions of state schools, and may hold religious education classes and religious services while the school is open for instruction. At some state-integrated secondary schools, religious studies is offered as a subject contributing to the National Certificate of Educational Achievement (NCEA), New Zealand's main secondary school qualification.

State-integrated schools are permitted to give preference in enrolment to students who, either themselves or through their parents, identify with the school's special character. Each proprietor defines what is required for preferential enrolment. For all Catholic schools and most other religious schools, a letter from the priest of the student's or their parent's parish is required for preferential enrolment, and obtaining such a letter usually requires a certain commitment to the religion, e.g. Catholic priests usually require a minimum of the student's (or at least one of their parent's) baptism into the Catholic faith. Schools may admit a limited number of non-preference students (usually no more than 5–10% of their total roll) after all preferential enrolments, up to the maximum school roll set in the school's integration agreement.

=== Fees ===
State-integrated schools are allowed to charge a fee to parents of students known as "attendance dues". The Crown does not own the school land or buildings and do not fund their capital cost to maintain separation of church and state, so proprietors are permitted to charge attendance dues to keep the school up to the standard of an equivalent state school and to help pay off any debt accrued by the school before it was integrated. Proprietors cannot charge attendance dues for more than the amount set for their school and published in The New Zealand Gazette.

Apart from attendance dues, state-integrated schools like other state schools are not allowed to charge fees to domestic students (i.e. New Zealand citizens, permanent residents and temporary residents – the latter includes all Australian citizens), but commonly request voluntary donations to top-up funding from the government and attendance dues.

A survey of 25 state-integrated secondary schools by North & South magazine in November 2011 found the attendance dues generally ranged from NZ$240–280 per year for Catholic schools in Christchurch to $740 per year for Catholic schools in Hamilton, and from $1,150 to $2,300 per year for non-Catholic state-integrated schools. Requested donations at the surveyed schools varied from $140 to over $3,200. As a comparison, the largest donation requested by a non-integrated state school is $975 per year.
