= Northland, Wellington =

Suburb of Wellington City, New Zealand

Northland
- Suburb
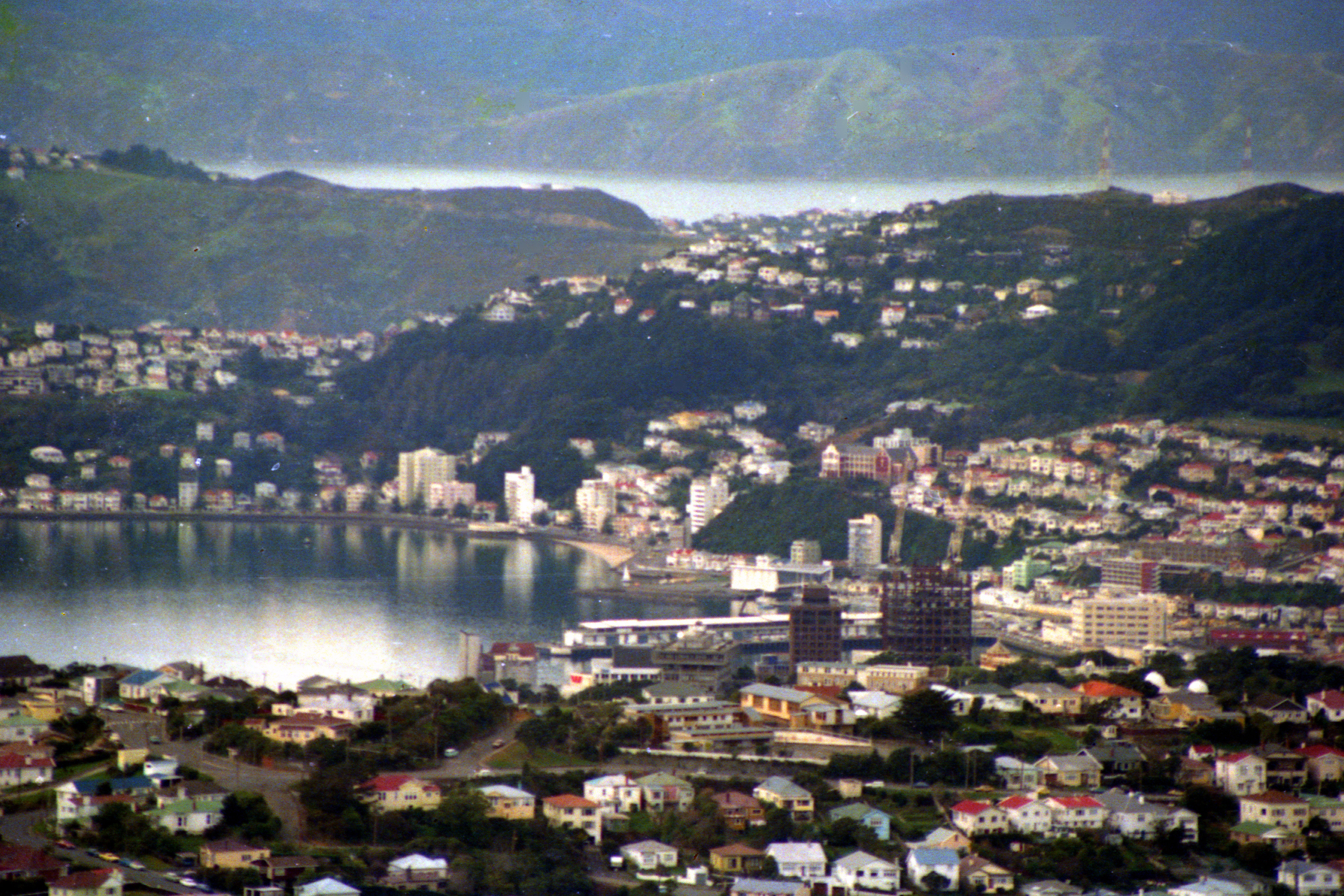
- Northland in the foreground, with Wellington Central behind it
- Interactive map of Northland
- Coordinates: 41°16′53″S 174°45′32″E
- Country: New Zealand
- City: Wellington City
- Local authority: Wellington City Council
- Electoral ward: Wharangi/Onslow-Western; Te Whanganui-a-Tara Māori Ward

Area
  - Land: 126 ha (310 acres)

Population (June 2025)
  - Total: 3,570
  - Density: 2,830/km^{2} (7,340/sq mi)

	Wilton	Wadestown
Karori	Northland	Thorndon; Wellington Botanic Garden; Kelburn
Zealandia Wildlife Sanctuary	Highbury

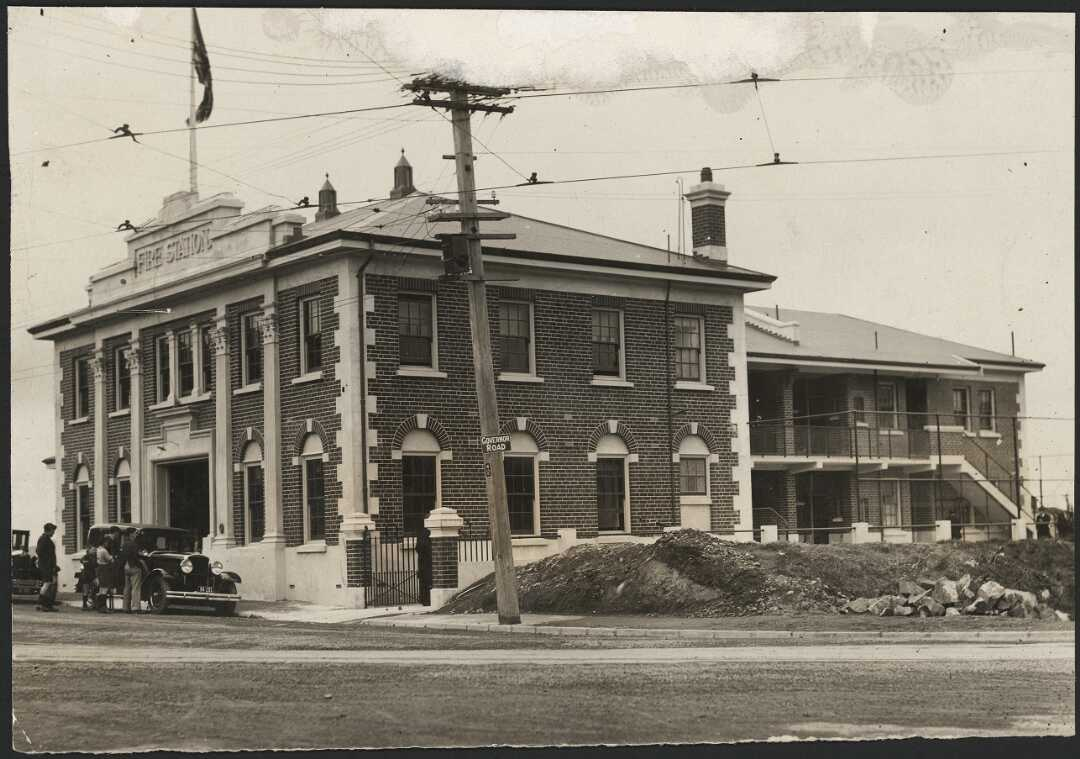
The new Fire Station 1930

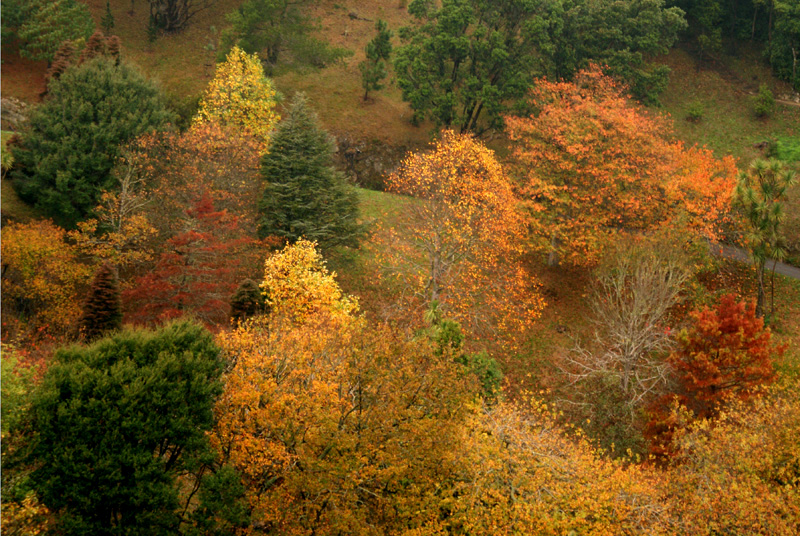
Northland overlooks Wellington's Botanic Garden

Northland is a suburb in west-central Wellington, New Zealand. It borders the suburbs of Highbury, Kelburn, Thorndon, Wilton, Wadestown and Karori. Northland is populated by a mix of university students, young professionals and families. Part of the area was known as Creswick until the late 19th century when new roads and building sites were developed by the landowner, C J Pharazyn, who marketed the whole area as Northland. At that time it was described in The Evening Post (subsequently subsumed into The Dominion Post which was later renamed The Post) as Wellington's "best suburb".

== Location ==
Northland lies to the west of Kelburn separated by a steep gully. It is east of Karori, to the north of Highbury, some distance through The Town Belt to the south-west of Wadestown, and to the south of Wilton. It sits high on the south western slopes of Te Ahumairangi by the Wellington Botanic Garden, Zealandia Wildlife Sanctuary and, on the fill over the piped Kaiwharawhara Stream, Ian Galloway Park with its Rugby fields and dog exercise area.

== Notable buildings ==
There is a cluster of shops and takeaway food establishments at the top of Garden Road and just below Creswick Terrace known as the Creswick Shops. Woburn Road has the Northland Memorial Community Centre.

=== Heritage buildings ===
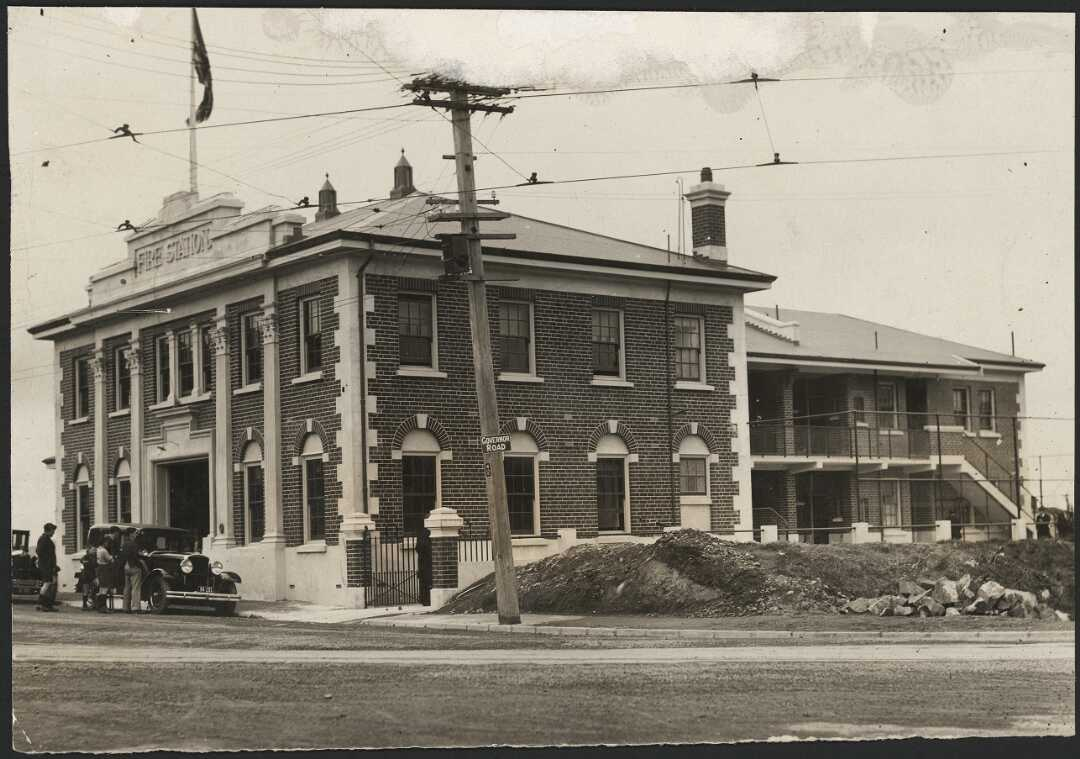
Northland Fire Station, Wellington

- Northland Fire Station, 54–56 Northland Road.
- The two church buildings at 69 and 77 Northland Road detailed below
- 92 Northland Road
- 82 Creswick Terrace
- Farm Road houses. Numbers 5, 10, 11 and 13
- The two tunnels

== Churches ==
Churches in Northland include:

- Old St Anne's Anglican church building at 77 Northland Road built about 1905 is listed as a Historic Place category 2. The building currently known as St Anne's was formerly Ward Memorial Methodist church at 69 Northland Road built 1929.
- St Vincent de Paul's Church which was located at The Rigi since 1917 was demolished in about 2000.

== Education ==
Northland School is a co-educational full primary school (years 1–8) with a roll of 227 as of October 2025. It opened in 1906.

Cardinal McKeefry Catholic Primary School was a state-integrated full primary school (years 1–8). It was moved up from Thorndon. It opened in 1970 and closed at the end of 2025.

== Notable residents ==
Harbour View Road

- Prime Ministers Michael Joseph Savage and after him Peter Fraser lived in a house bought in 1939 for the purpose at 64–66 Harbour View Road. Following the 1949 general election, Sidney Holland chose to live nearer parliament at 41 Pipitea Street, Thorndon.
- Potter Doreen Blumhardt lived in Harbour View Road from 1955 until her death in 2009. Her first house at number 35 was 65 steps down from the road, followed by a further 40 steps down to her work shed and kiln. It was designed for her by Anthony Treadwell and built in 1955. She bought number 70, directly above 35, in 1979 for its drive-on access and lived there from 1986 until her death.

Northland Road

- Author Iris Wilkinson (Robin Hyde) lived at 92 Northland Road from 1919 to 1928.

== National Poetry Collection ==
The Poetry Archive of New Zealand Aotearoa Charitable Trust developed by Michael O'Leary and Dr Niel Wright is located in Woburn Road.

== History ==
=== Orangikaupapa ===
The Orangikaupapa Block (or Orangi-Kaupapa) on the hill directly opposite the main entrance to the Botanical Gardens was a small Ngāti Awa village where there was "considerable settlement". Population in the 1886 census: 53 males and 48 females. In the 1892 census it had doubled to 110 males and 102 females It was also known as Cliff Pa. In the early 20th century the hill was known for a time as Wireless Hill and is now Te Ahumairangi.

Near the top of the road there were 80 acres of potato gardens belonging to Te Matehou of Pipitea.

=== Creswick ===
The township of Creswick in Karori riding of Hutt County (Note: Karori was administered as a subsection (riding) of the Hutt County and did not achieve its own independent borough status until 24 September 1891. Karori Borough amalgamated with Wellington city on 1 April 1920.) was surveyed and subdivided and more than a hundred allotments offered for sale in August 1878. The sections varied in size between quarter of an acre and three acres. Population in the 1886 census: 58 males and 30 females, 1892: 47 males and 35 females. The name Creswick stuck to the area between Randwick Road and what was the Kaiwharawhara Stream and is now Curtis Street for some years. A further fifty-one sites were sold in March 1895

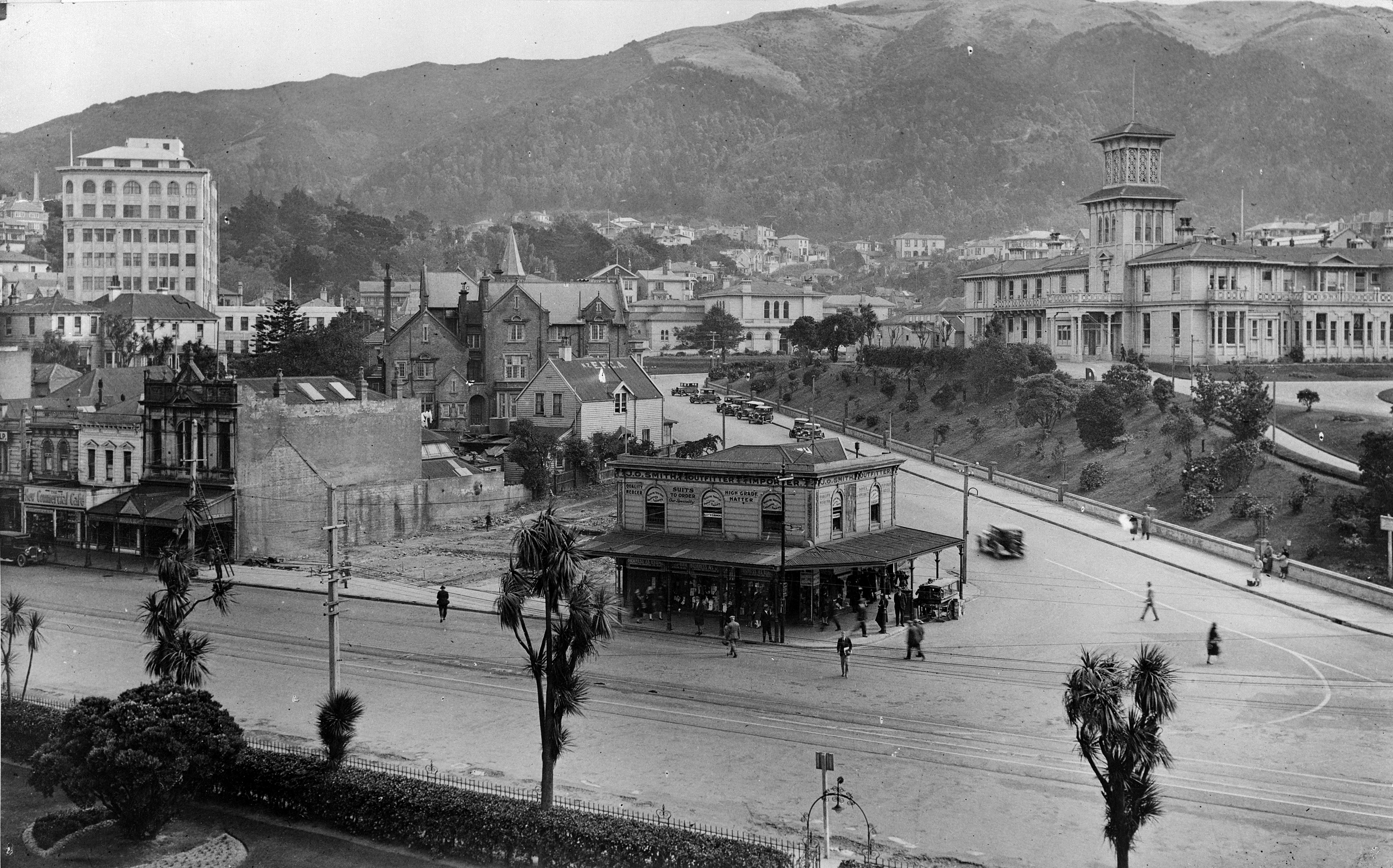
Northland high to the far left behind old Government House centre right

=== Governor's Farm ===
The area on the Glenmore Street side had the name Governor's Farm because for some years in the 19th century the owner, C. J. Pharazyn, leased it to Government House when that was in Thorndon on The Beehive's site. Government House used it for a kind of home farm with vegetable gardens (Garden Road) dairy cows and grazing for horses. The building known as Governor's farmhouse was on what is now Seaview Terrace where it joins the military road. The kink in Glenmore Street at its junction with Garden Road was known as Governor's Bend.

=== Gold ===
An "auriferous alluvial deposit" was found on a low spur running east–west on the Governor's Farm a few hundred yards from the Botanical Gardens while Mr Bidmead was burying a dead cow in 1888.

=== Northland ===
The new western suburb of Wellington, the new township of Northland, was subdivided and put on sale on 9 March 1900 on the instructions of C. J. Pharazyn.

It was named by him in honour of Thomas Uchter Caulfield, Viscount Northland (1882–1915), the eldest son of the Earl of Ranfurly, Governor of New Zealand from 1897 to 1904. Viscount Northland was a subsidiary title of the Earl's, borne by his eldest son as a courtesy.

On 1 April 1908 Northland left the Borough of Karori following a declaration by the Minister of Internal Affairs that the Kaiwarra Stream (Kaiwharawhara Stream) would be the boundary between Karori and the city of Wellington.

=== Tunnels ===
The Karori Tunnel: a new road was built in 1898 from Wellington to Karori including a tunnel beneath Baker's Hill. If built as a cutting it would have created 140 foot high slopes on each side with a high risk of slips. The tunnel also left Raroa Crescent, the existing Te Aro — Karori road, undisturbed

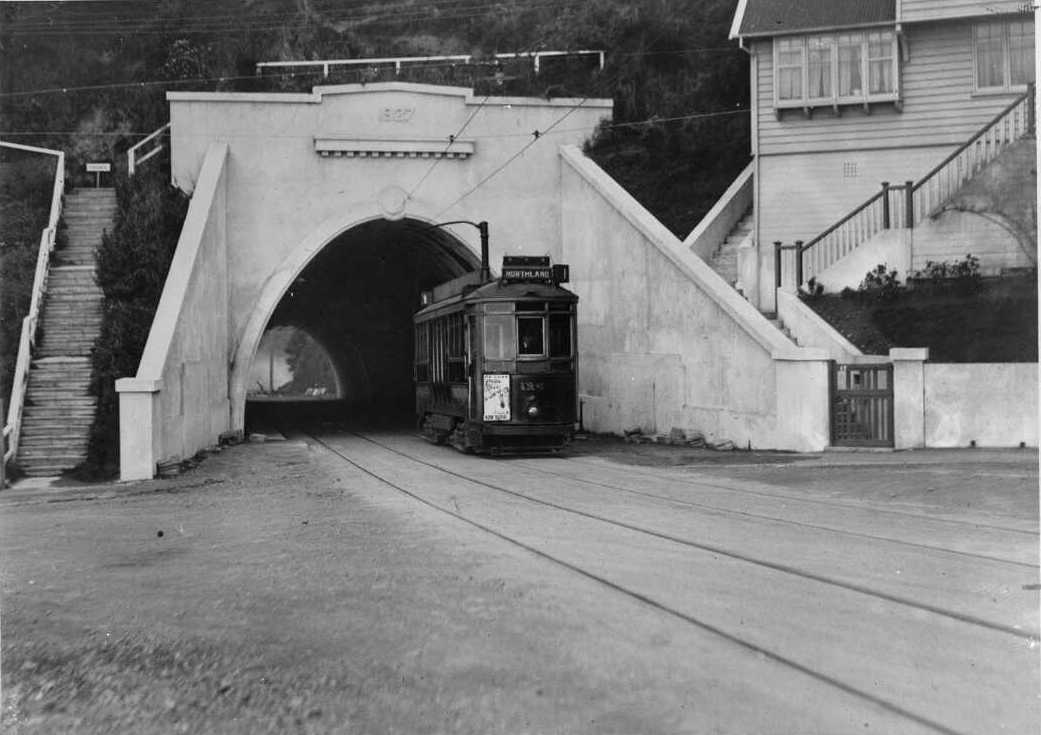
A tram arrives on Northland Road 1929

The Northland Tunnel: major earthworks were required to build ramps to link the tunnel's Northland Road, Raroa Road (now Raroa Crescent) and Karori Road now known as Chaytor Street at a gradient suitable for trams. Tunnelling found greasy and treacherous ground requiring double shifts on the tunnelling to complete lining and stabilising as quickly as possible. In view of public concern for the safety of the workmen, a resolution was passed at meeting held under the auspices of the Labour Party requesting that Robert Semple, an expert tunneller, inspect the site. The resolution was referred to the Mayor (Robert Wright) who said that he had no comment to make upon it. The stability of the tunnel remained in doubt. Expensive remedial work was finished in January 1928. A bus service was provided because the roadway on the Northland side had yet to be widened and reinforced to take the weight of the trams. There were lengthy courtroom battles between Council and affected residents which had to be settled before that work could be carried out. The tunnel was opened to trams on 4 June 1929.

The Karori Tunnel was 250 feet long, the Northland Tunnel, 225 feet. For comparison the Kilbirnie (Mt Victoria bus) Tunnel is 1,274 feet and Seatoun 470 feet.

== Demographics ==
Northland statistical area covers 1.26 km^{2} (0.49 sq mi). It had an estimated population of 3,570 as of June 2025, with a population density of 2,833 people per km^{2}.

Historical population
Year	Pop.	±% p.a.
2006	3,261	—
2013	3,357	+0.42%
2018	3,552	+1.14%
2023	3,435	−0.67%

Northland had a population of 3,435 in the 2023 New Zealand census, a decrease of 117 people (−3.3%) since the 2018 census, and an increase of 78 people (2.3%) since the 2013 census. There were 1,626 males, 1,752 females, and 57 people of other genders in 1,350 dwellings. 11.4% of people identified as LGBTIQ+. The median age was 32.5 years (compared with 38.1 years nationally). There were 426 people (12.4%) aged under 15 years, 1,134 (33.0%) aged 15 to 29, 1,542 (44.9%) aged 30 to 64, and 330 (9.6%) aged 65 or older.

People could identify as more than one ethnicity. The results were 86.9% European (Pākehā); 8.8% Māori; 2.4% Pasifika; 10.0% Asian; 2.7% Middle Eastern, Latin American and African New Zealanders (MELAA); and 1.2% other, which includes people giving their ethnicity as "New Zealander". English was spoken by 98.3%, Māori by 2.3%, Samoan by 0.3%, and other languages by 18.1%. No language could be spoken by 1.1% (e.g. too young to talk). New Zealand Sign Language was known by 0.6%. The percentage of people born overseas was 29.4, compared with 28.8% nationally.

Religious affiliations were 19.0% Christian, 1.2% Hindu, 0.8% Islam, 0.1% Māori religious beliefs, 0.7% Buddhist, 0.6% New Age, 0.3% Jewish, and 2.4% other religions. People who answered that they had no religion were 69.9%, and 5.1% of people did not answer the census question.

Of those at least 15 years old, 1,872 (62.2%) people had a bachelor's or higher degree, 936 (31.1%) had a post-high school certificate or diploma, and 201 (6.7%) people exclusively held high school qualifications. The median income was $61,700, compared with $41,500 nationally. 855 people (28.4%) earned over $100,000 compared to 12.1% nationally. The employment status of those at least 15 was 1,860 (61.8%) full-time, 504 (16.7%) part-time, and 90 (3.0%) unemployed.
