= Northland School =

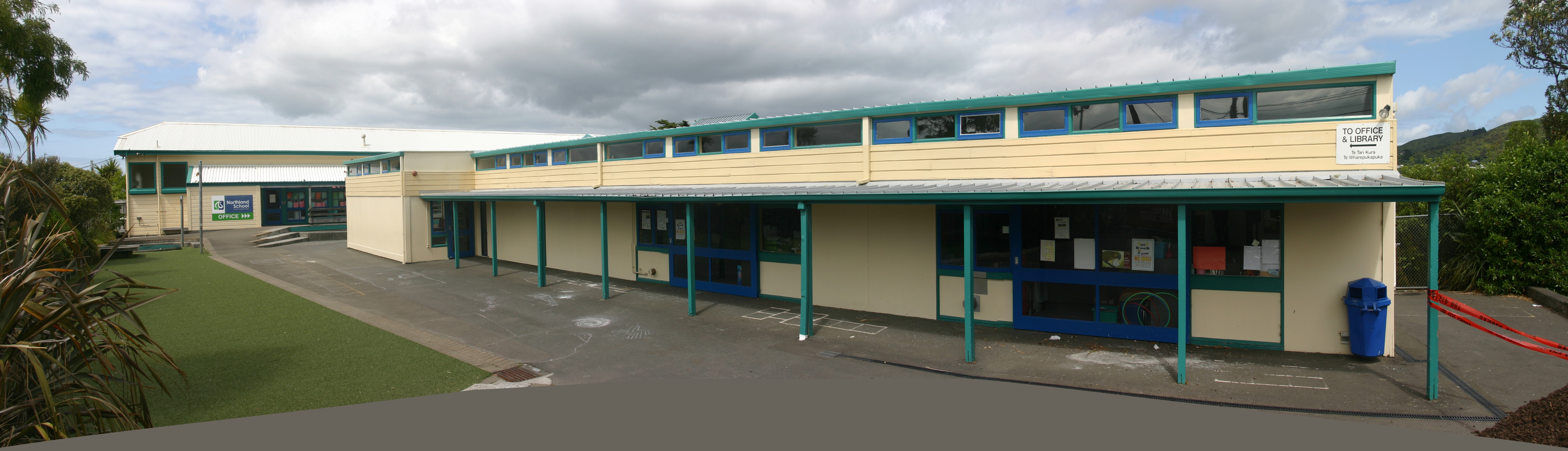
- Northland School

Location
- 14 Harbour View Road, Northland, Wellington, New Zealand; 41.280654°S 174.760124°E

Information
- Type: State coed primary, years 1–8
- Established: 1906
- Ministry of Education Institution no.: 2931
- Principal: Andrea Peetz
- Enrolment: 219 (July 2026)
- Socio-economic decile: 10
- Website: northland.school.nz

Northland School is a small state primary school in Northland, western Wellington, and was established in 1906. The school is situated at 14 Harbour View Road and is a decile ten school. Northland School caters for Years 1 through 8, and there are 4 teams, each made up of 2–3 year groups. Each team has 3–4 classes and the children change classes every year. The school has a Bring Your Own Device (or BYOD) system. In 2016 the school received funding to rebuild aging and leaky classrooms.

== Sport ==
Northland School compete in many Western Zone Championships. These include Football, Rippa Rugby, Cricket, Athletics and Swimming. The school also has a large focus on Netball and the school Netball team has its own website (linked below).

== Notable alumni ==
- Ocean Mercier - scientist
- Shona McCullagh - choreographer and dancer
- Tandi Wright - actor

== 2006 centennial ==
In 2006, Northland School held its 100 Year Anniversary. All of the students took part in the school play. The students were divided into four teams; Team 1 (Years 0–2) took the first 25 years, Team 2 (Years 3–4) took the next 25 years, Team 3 (Years 5–6) took the next 25 years, and Team 4 (Years 7–8) took the last 25 years.

== School principals ==
The school has had the following principals:

- 2021–present Andrea Peetz
- 2003–2020 Jeremy Edwards
- 1995–2002 Pat Manning
- 1990–1994 Liz Millar
- 1967–1990 Lou Grondin
- 1962–1966 Mr C. P. Bryce
- 1957–1961 Mr. L. H. Bansgrove
- 1956–1957 Mr. R. MacCaskill
- 1954–1956 Mr. H. Downes
- 1951–1953 Mr. H. Blackburn
- 1946–1951 Mr. E. G. Thomas
- 1943–1946 Mr. C. F. Rockel
- 1942–1943 Mr. N. Gilchrist
- 1939–1941 Mr. H. F. Gabites
- 1937–1939 Mr. A. J. Trevena
- 1926–1937 Mr. J. Barnett
- 1923–1926 Mr. O. J. Howarth
- 1906–1923 Mr. D .M. Polson
