= Mākara Peak Mountain Bike Park =

Biking and walking park in New Zealand

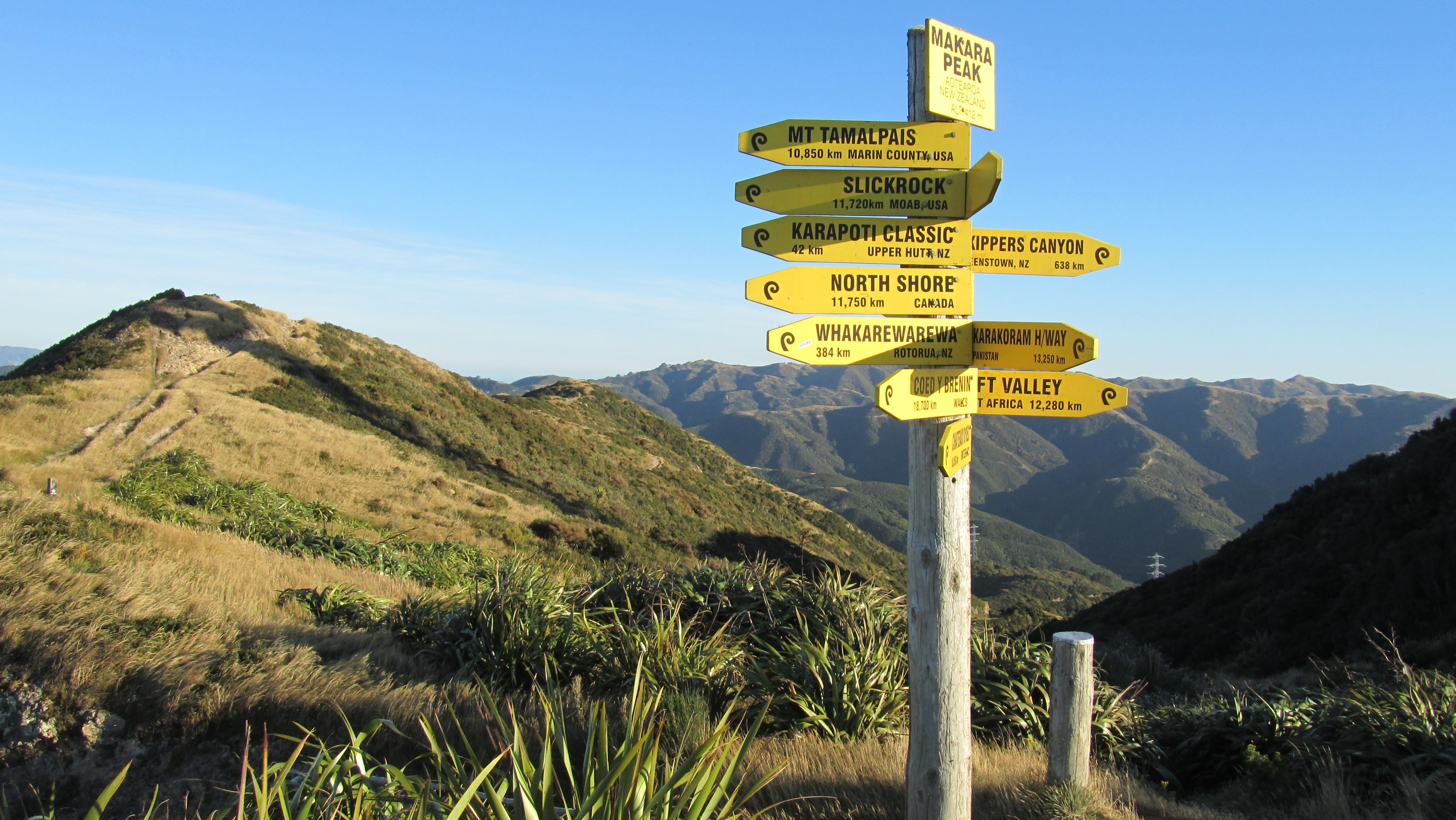
- Mākara Peak Mountain Bike Park summit
- Interactive map of Mākara Peak Mountain Bike Park
- Type: Mountain bike park, Recreation reserve
- Location: Wellington, New Zealand
- Coordinates: 41.296946°S 174.722241°E
- Area: 250 hectares (620 acres)
- Created: 1998
- Operator: Makara Peak Mountain Bike Park Supporters Incorporated and Wellington City Council
- Open: 24 hours a day, all year around.
- Website: makarapeak.bike

Mākara Peak Mountain Bike Park (Māori: Mākara Maunga Pahikara) is a mountain biking and walking park in Wellington, New Zealand.

== History ==
Makara Peak Mountain Bike Park opened in 1998. In 1998 the Wellington City Council set aside 200 hectares of retired farmland in Karori southwest of Wellington, New Zealand, for a mountain bike park. Development of it began almost immediately with volunteer work parties planting trees, removing pest animals and digging new tracks.

By 2014 the park had grown to 250 hectares with over 40 kilometres of hand-built single track and over 35,000 native seedlings planted. Pests such as goats, sheep, and possums had been dramatically reduced with volunteers maintaining possum traps and bait stations and mustelid traps, allowing new vegetation to flourish. Wellington City Council used the poison brodifacoum for possum control; 1080 was not used.

A 72-metre swing bridge was added to the mountain bike park in 2017 after a successful donation campaign raised over $35,000.

Tracks continue to be created and upgraded; a 2–3 year work plan began in 2020 to add more tracks in the north of the park.

== Operations ==
Mākara Peak Mountain Bike Park covers 250 hectares and has 40 kilometres of mountain biking trails. It also includes a skills area, which was renovated in 2020 to focus on jumps.

The park is free to use and open to both cyclists and pedestrians. Approximately 30% of its users are pedestrians.

The Makara Peak Mountain Bike Park was visited by 8% of the Wellington population in 2003 according to research carried out by the Wellington City Council. It has received a recreation award from the New Zealand Recreation Association and two conservation awards from the New Zealand Department of Conservation.

The park is jointly managed by the Wellington City Council and Makara Peak Mountain Bike Park Supporters Inc.

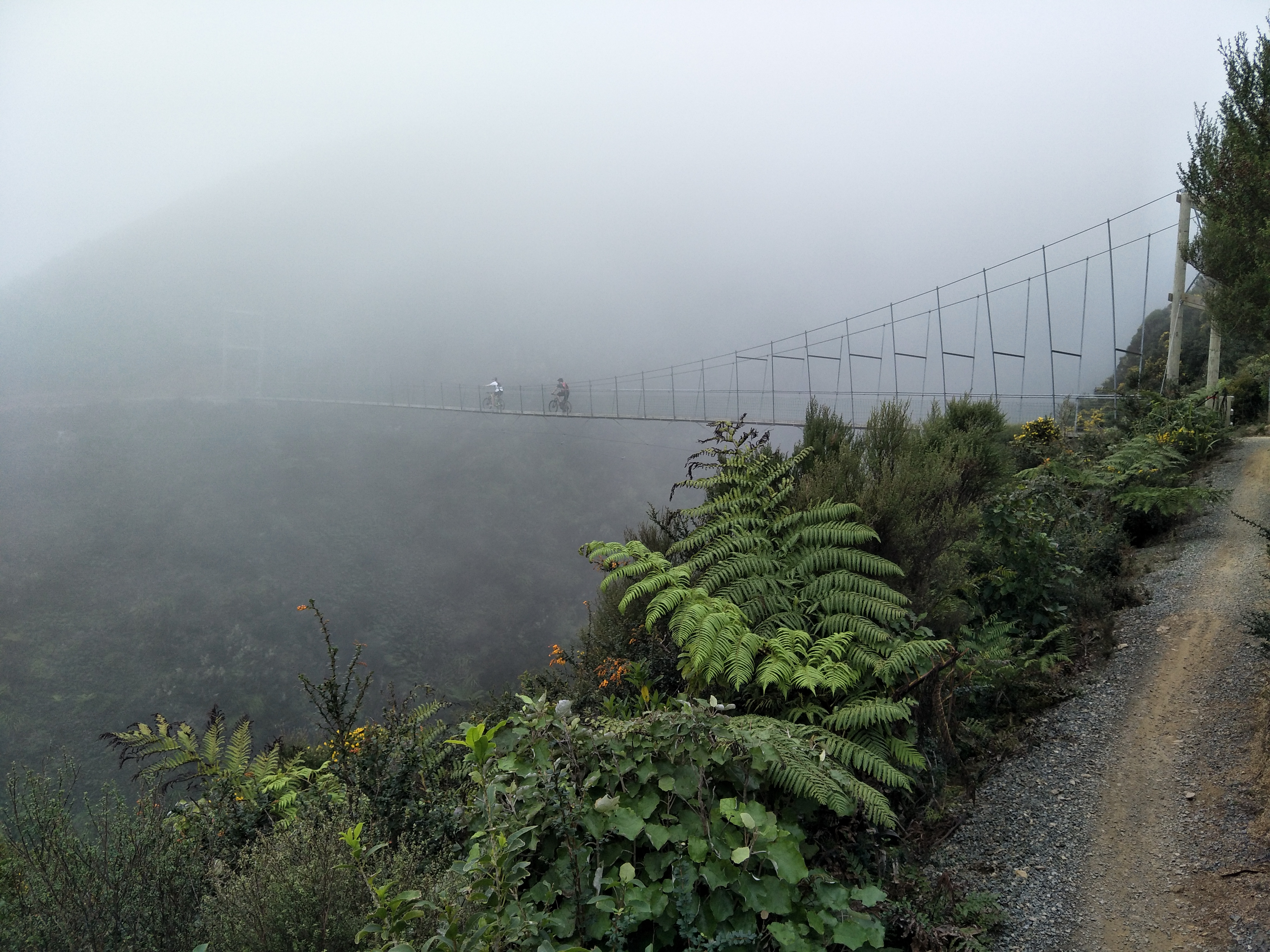
Swing Bridge on Upswing track of the Makara Peak Mountain Bike Park
