= Edward Hill (New Zealand politician) =

New Zealand clergyman and mayor (1907–2001)

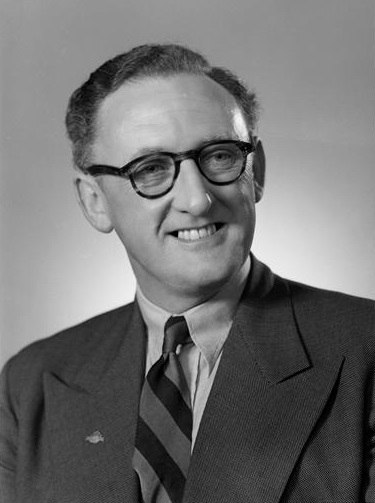
- Hill in 1953

18th Mayor of New Plymouth
- In office 17 November 1953 – 17 November 1956
- Deputy: Alf Honnor
- Preceded by: Everard Gilmour
- Succeeded by: Alf Honnor

Personal details
- Born: 30 March 1907 Bristol, England
- Died: 2001 (aged 93–94) Wellington, New Zealand
- Party: Labour
- Spouse(s): Jean O'Hagan Morton†; Mattie Hill
- Children: 3 including Beatrice Tinsley

Edward Owen Eustace Hill (30 March 1907 – 2001) was an English-born New Zealand politician who served as the 18th Mayor of New Plymouth.

== Biography ==
=== Early life ===
Hill was born at Winterbourne Park, Bristol in 1907 before moving to Wales at six years old. His family were a traditional shipping family and was later to become a director of the Bristol City line of steamships, trading between South Wales ports and North America until he became a parson. Hill was educated at Oxford University where he graduated with a Master of Arts degree in history. While at Oxford he was involved with the Christian movement the Oxford Group (Buchmanites). With the Buchmanites he travelled extensively to the United States, Canada, Denmark and Norway as well as an extensive period in South Africa. He then worked in a legal office until joining the Army during World War II serving for most of the war as a staff officer at Western Command headquarters.

He later moved to New Zealand with his wife, Jean, and daughters, Rowena, Beatrice and Theodora in 1946 where he became an Anglican clergyman. He received his ordination in Christchurch and his first curacy was at St Mary's in Merivale and was later vicar of Southbridge by Lake Ellesmere for two years before moving to New Plymouth.

=== Political career ===
Hill resigned from the clergy and was approached by the New Plymouth Junior Chamber of Commerce to stand for the mayoralty. He was elected Mayor of New Plymouth in 1953 succeeding the long serving Everard Gilmour who had been mayor for two decades. Hill was the first to run against Gilmour since 1933 and defeated both him and two other candidates for the position. He served only one term as Mayor and was defeated by Alf Honnor 4,181 votes to 2,675 in 1956. Despite losing the mayoralty Hill won a seat on the council that year serving a further term on the New Plymouth Borough Council.

Hill was considered then to be the most "unlikely" mayor in New Plymouth's history because he was an outsider, having lived in the city for only two years and had no previous civic experience. Hill later recalled that his most satisfying projects as mayor had been helping to build pensioner flats, and the construction of the War Memorial Hall building. Hill also welcomed Queen Elizabeth II on New Plymouth's behalf during her Royal Tour in 1954.

He later moved back to Britain briefly but returned to New Zealand and settled in Wellington as a union secretary. He later became the chairman of both the Kelburn Progressive Association and Wellington State House Committee and was also involved with the British Sailors' Society and New Zealand Scenery Preservation Society. In 1966 he was elected the President of the Wellington Labour Representation Committee. He stood several times for the Wellington City Council as a Labour candidate in 1965, 1968 and a 1969 by-election. While generally polling well he never won a seat. He was involved with the Free China Society and attended multiple anti-communist conferences in Bangkok, Tokyo and Saigon.

=== Death ===
Hill died in Wellington in 2001.

== Personal life ==
Hill's first marriage was to Jean O'Hagan Morton whom he met in Canada in 1937 and was also a member of the Buchmanites. She was an author who published three novels and a collection of writings all under the name Jean O. Hill. They had three daughters, Rowena, Beatrice and Theodora. His daughter Beatrice Tinsley had a notable career as an astronomer and cosmologist in the United States, where she was renowned as one of the world's greatest astrophysicists, but died prematurely in 1981 at the age of 40. After his first wife's death he remarried to Mattie Hill.

Political offices
Preceded by Everard Gilmour	Mayor of New Plymouth; 1953–1956	Succeeded by Alf Honnor
