= Pres-Lam =

Pres-Lam is a method of mass engineered timber construction that uses high strength unbonded steel cables or bars to create connections between timber beams and columns or columns and walls and their foundations. As a prestressed structure the steel cables clamp members together creating connections which are stronger and more compact than traditional timber fastening systems. In earthquake zones, the steel cables can be coupled with internal or external steel reinforcing which provide additional strength and energy dissipation creating a damage avoiding structural system.

Pres-Lam can be used in conjunction with any mass engineered timber product such as glue laminated timber, laminated veneer lumber or cross laminated timber.

== History ==
The concept of Pres-Lam was developed at the University of Canterbury in Christchurch, New Zealand by a team led by Professors Stefano Pampanin, Alessandro Palermo and Andy Buchanan in collaboration with PreStressed Timber Limited (PTL). The system stems from techniques developed during the US PRESSS at the University of California, San Diego during the 1990s under the leadership of New Zealand structural engineer Nigel Priestley.

Beginning in 2008 a 5-year research campaign was begun under the Structural Timber Innovation Company. During this period the first examples of Pres-Lam structures were completed in New Zealand. Following the systems success, international research efforts have begun at ETH Zurich, the University of Basilicata, Washington State University and several other research institutions. In 2017 the NHERI Tallwood project was started with funding from the U.S. National Science Foundation focused on further validation of Pres-Lam in North America.

== Notable structures ==
- The Nelson Marlborough Institute of Technology Arts and Media Building – The world's first Pres-Lam Building
- The College of Creative Arts, Massey University – Uses Pres-Lam frames to augment vertical load carrying capacity and well as high seismic loading
- The Kaikōura District Council building – Subjected to the 2016 Kaikōura earthquake without damage and subsequently used as response headquarters
- The ETH Zurich house of Natural Resources – the first Pres-Lam building to be constructed outside of New Zealand
- Peavy Hall – a three-storey mixed use education building under construction Oregon State University campus in Corvallis, Oregon, United States.
