= Wendy Lawson =

New Zealand glaciology academic

Wendy Julia Lawson
- Education: University of Cambridge
- Scientific career
- Fields: physical geography of claciers
- Workplaces: University of Canterbury
- Thesis: The structural evolution of Variegated Glacier, Alaska. (1990)

Wendy Julia Lawson is a New Zealand glaciology academic. She is currently a full professor at the University of Canterbury.

== Academic career ==
After an undergraduate at the University of Manchester and a 1990 PhD titled 'The structural evolution of Variegated Glacier, Alaska.' at the University of Cambridge, she moved to the University of Canterbury, rising to full professor and Pro-Vice Chancellor of Science.

== Selected works ==
- Arnold, N. S., I. C. Willis, M. J. Sharp, K. S. Richards, and W. J. Lawson. "A distributed surface energy-balance model for a small valley glacier. I. Development and testing for Haut Glacier d’Arolla, Valais, Switzerland." Journal of Glaciology 42, no. 140 (1996): 77–89.
- Lawson, Wendy J., Martin J. Sharp, and Michael J. Hambrey. "The structural geology of a surge-type glacier." Journal of Structural Geology 16, no. 10 (1994): 1447–1462.
- Anderson, Brian M., Richard CA Hindmarsh, and Wendy J. Lawson. "A modelling study of the response of Hatherton Glacier to Ross Ice Sheet grounding line retreat." Global and Planetary Change 42, no. 1-4 (2004): 143–153.
- Hubbard, Bryn, Martin Sharp, and Wendy J. Lawson. "On the sedimentological character of Alpine basal ice facies." Annals of Glaciology 22 (1996): 187–193.
