= Wilton, New Zealand =

Suburb of Wellington City, New Zealand

Wilton
- Suburb
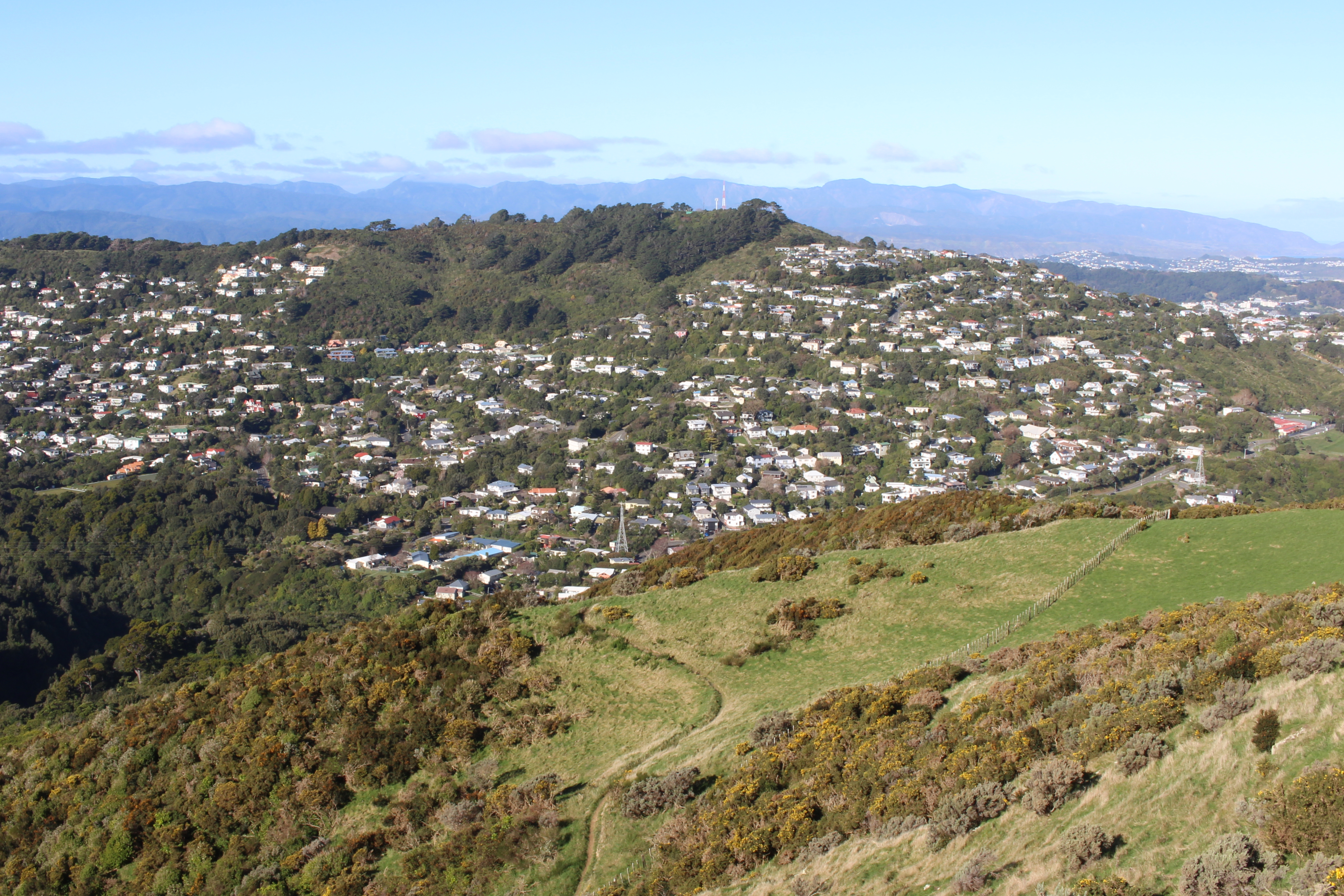
- Wilton from the north-east in 2025
- Interactive map of Wilton
- Coordinates: 41°16′05″S 174°45′25″E
- Country: New Zealand
- City: Wellington
- Local authority: Wellington City Council
- Electoral ward: Wharangi/Onslow-Western; Te Whanganui-a-Tara Māori Ward

Area
  - Land: 126 ha (310 acres)

Population (June 2025)
  - Total: 2,170
  - Density: 1,720/km^{2} (4,460/sq mi)
- Postcode: 6012

	Crofton Downs
	Wilton	Wadestown, Thorndon
Northland	Karori

Wilton is a small suburb in Wellington, New Zealand. It is best known for Ōtari-Wilton's Bush, a large reserve that is situated in the suburb. Ōtari-Wilton's bush is the only public botanic garden in New Zealand dedicated solely to native plants. It features 14 km of walking tracks and a 'canopy walkway'. The canopy walkway is a raised walkway that provides a unique chance to view life in, and from, the top level of trees such as mature tawa, rewarewa and hinau.

== History ==
Job Wilton was a sheep farmer; in 1861 he had a flock of 165 sheep, to be washed in the Kaiwharawhara Stream before shearing. He subdivided his farm in 1915, but Wilton was semi-rural to the 1930s with little housing development until after World War II. A Sunday trip to Wilton's Bush and Chapman's Gardens (now the Otari Plant Museum) required walking from the Wadestown tram terminus. From 1944 a feeder bus ran from the terminus. A school opened in 1956. Wilton House in Blackbridge Road was built for Courtenay Place chemist Mr O'Connor and his sister in 1925.

== Demographics ==
Wilton statistical area covers 1.26 km^{2} (0.49 sq mi). It had an estimated population of 2,170 as of June 2025, with a population density of 1,722 people per km^{2}.

Historical population
Year	Pop.	±% p.a.
2006	2,034	—
2013	2,049	+0.11%
2018	2,205	+1.48%
2023	2,127	−0.72%

Wilton had a population of 2,127 in the 2023 New Zealand census, a decrease of 78 people (−3.5%) since the 2018 census, and an increase of 78 people (3.8%) since the 2013 census. There were 1,026 males, 1,080 females, and 21 people of other genders in 849 dwellings. 8.2% of people identified as LGBTIQ+. The median age was 38.6 years (compared with 38.1 years nationally). There were 333 people (15.7%) aged under 15 years, 462 (21.7%) aged 15 to 29, 1,047 (49.2%) aged 30 to 64, and 279 (13.1%) aged 65 or older.

People could identify as more than one ethnicity. The results were 84.6% European (Pākehā); 10.6% Māori; 4.9% Pasifika; 7.9% Asian; 3.8% Middle Eastern, Latin American and African New Zealanders (MELAA); and 2.5% other, which includes people giving their ethnicity as "New Zealander". English was spoken by 97.5%, Māori by 3.5%, Samoan by 1.4%, and other languages by 18.8%. No language could be spoken by 1.4% (e.g. too young to talk). New Zealand Sign Language was known by 0.6%. The percentage of people born overseas was 28.2, compared with 28.8% nationally.

Religious affiliations were 22.7% Christian, 1.0% Hindu, 2.0% Islam, 0.4% Māori religious beliefs, 1.0% Buddhist, 0.8% New Age, 0.3% Jewish, and 1.6% other religions. People who answered that they had no religion were 65.3%, and 5.1% of people did not answer the census question.

Of those at least 15 years old, 1,008 (56.2%) people had a bachelor's or higher degree, 609 (33.9%) had a post-high school certificate or diploma, and 171 (9.5%) people exclusively held high school qualifications. The median income was $61,700, compared with $41,500 nationally. 480 people (26.8%) earned over $100,000 compared to 12.1% nationally. The employment status of those at least 15 was 1,071 (59.7%) full-time, 216 (12.0%) part-time, and 45 (2.5%) unemployed.

== Education ==
=== School enrolment zone ===
Wilton is within the enrolment zones for Wellington College, Wellington Girls' College, Wellington High School, Onslow College, St Oran's College and the Otari School.

=== Primary school ===
Ōtari School (Te Kura o Ōtari) is a state-funded full-primary school nestled next to the Otari-Wilton's Bush. Since 1992 the school has encompassed three teaching strands: Montessori, Māori Immersion and the standard New Zealand curriculum. It had a roll of 211 as of October 2025. It opened in 1956 as Wilton School, and changed its name in 1999.

== Transportation ==
Wilton is served by multiple bus services:

- No 4 Strathmore - Mairangi
- No 13 Mairangi - Brandon Street
- No 14 Wilton - Kilbirnie
- No 22 Johnsonville - Wellington
- No N4 Night service Wellington - Khandallah

== Churches ==
The Catholic Parish of Ōtari has one church in Wilton - St Thomas More, in Worcester Street.
