= Peavy Hall =

Building on the Oregon State University campus in Corvallis, Oregon, U.S.

Coordinates: 44.56436°N 123.28568°W

Peavy Hall is a building located at 3100 Southwest Jefferson Way on the Oregon State University campus in Corvallis, Oregon, United States.
