= Kelburn, New Zealand =

Suburb of Wellington City, New Zealand

Kelburn
- Suburb
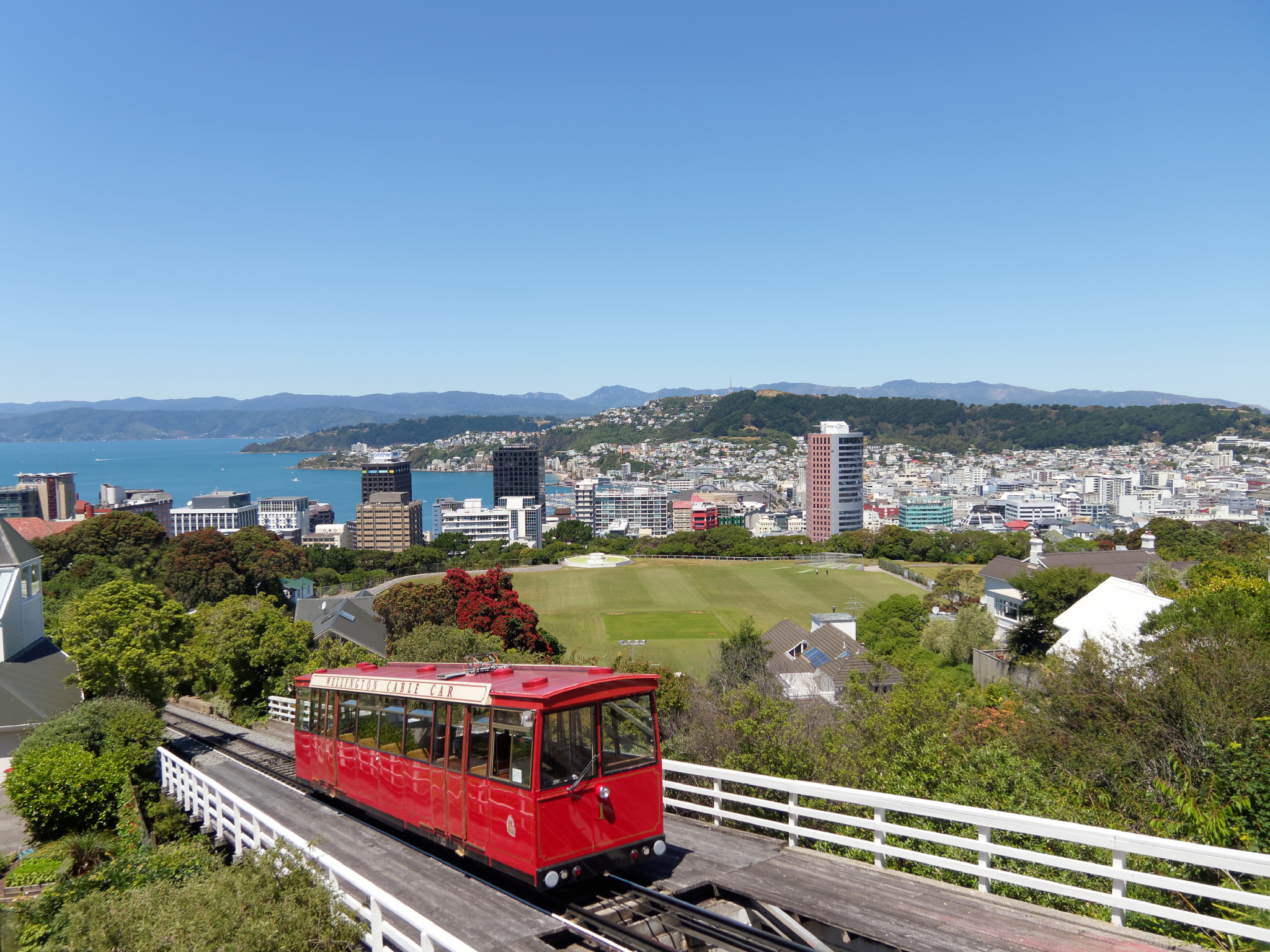
- View of Wellington Cable Car, Kelburn Park sports field and central business district, from the Botanic Garden
- Interactive map of Kelburn
- Location within New Zealand Wellington
- Coordinates: 41°17′20″S 174°45′48″E
- Country: New Zealand
- City: Wellington City
- Local authority: Wellington City Council
- Electoral ward: Pukehīnau/Lambton Ward; Te Whanganui-a-Tara Māori Ward
- Established: 1896

Area
  - Land: 143 ha (350 acres)

Population (June 2025)
  - Total: 4,370
  - Density: 3,060/km^{2} (7,910/sq mi)
- Postcode: 6012
- Train stations: Kelburn terminus, Wellington Cable Car

Northland	Wellington Botanic Garden, Thorndon
Karori	Kelburn	Wellington CBD
Highbury	Aro Valley

Kelburn is a central suburb of Wellington, the capital city of New Zealand, situated within 1 kilometre (0.62 mi) of the central business district.

Kelburn sits on the hills just west of the capital's central business district and is bordered by the Botanic Garden and the suburbs of Thorndon and Northland to the north, the suburbs of Karori and Highbury to the south west, and Aro Valley to the south.

== Features ==
The iconic Wellington Cable Car is a tourist attraction and public transport facility. Operating since 1902, it is a funicular railway that ascends from Lambton Quay in the central business district to Kelburn. The Wellington Cable Car Museum is next to its Kelburn terminus.

The Wellington Botanic Garden comprises 25 hectares of native forest, gardens and displays, and has entrances adjacent to the Kelburn terminus of the cable car and on Kelburn's Glen Road.

The main campus of Victoria University of Wellington is in Kelburn, and is home to the category 1 listed Hunter Building, the Adam Art Gallery and the Adam Concert Room. It includes Te Tumu Herenga Waka Marae, a tribal meeting place of the Ngāti Awa hapū of Ngāti Awa ki Poneke.

The Carter Observatory includes a planetarium and exhibition, and is located within the Botanic Garden, close to the Kelburn terminus of the cable car. The cable car also has a university stop next to Kelburn Park, which serves as a university and community sports ground.

Kelburn Village, on Upland Road, houses cafes, restaurants, a pub and local shops. Several embassies and consulates are based in Kelburn, notably the Embassy of the Republic of Indonesia on Glen Road. The entrance to Zealandia, a 225-hectare native forest and wildlife sanctuary is in the West of the suburb.

The Kelburn Viaduct was one of New Zealand's earliest reinforced concrete bridges, and provides vehicle and foot access to Karori and other Western suburbs. Completed in 1931, it is a two-lane road bridge with reinforced-concrete girders. Designed by the Wellington City Council's engineering department under the leadership of notable engineer George A. Hart (1870–1948), it stands out as a key structure in the urban streetscape. This bridge holds historical and social importance because it represented a significant modernization of the city's road network and continues to serve as a vital transportation route.

== History ==
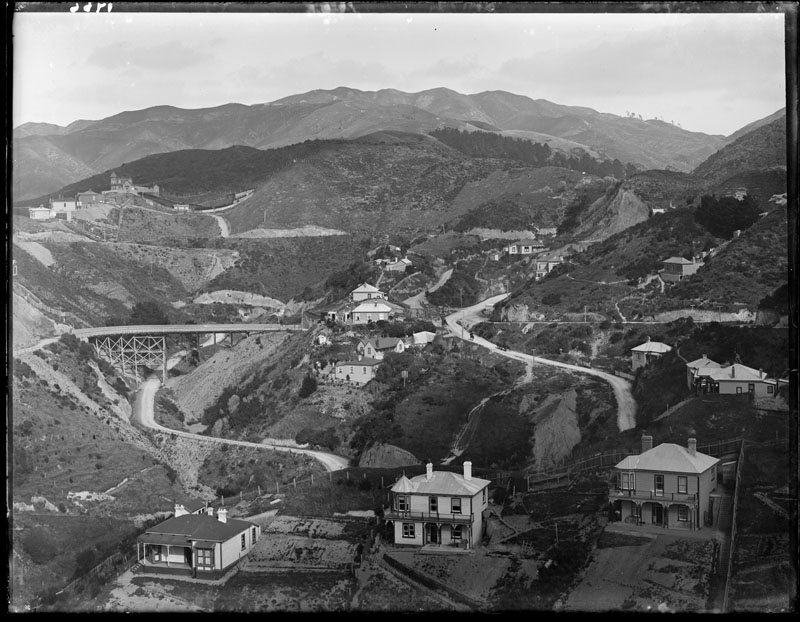
Kelburn in 1904

The suburb of Kelburn was established after the Upland Estate Company purchased farmland from William Moxham in 1896. It was named after Viscount Kelburn, son of the Governor of New Zealand at the time. Historically Kelburn was also incorrectly spelt as 'Kelburne'.

In 1898, the investors formed a company to build and operate the cable car, to distinguish the nascent suburb from competing residential developments. Kelburn was populated quickly following the opening of the cable car in 1902, with Victoria University's Hunter Building opening in 1904, the Dominion Observatory in 1907, construction of St Michael's Church in 1912, and of Kelburn Normal School in 1914.

Kelburn sits on Pukehinau Ridge, which runs from Upland Road adjacent to Kelburn Parade and the Botanic Garden down to Raroa Road in Aro Valley to the south, ending to the north near the intersection of St Michaels Crescent and Upland Road near Kelburn Village. The area was traditionally used for bird-snaring, which aligns with the 2019 renaming of the Botanic Garden to the Botanic Garden ki Paekākā, 'the realm or perch of the kākā', and the nearby Waikoukou Stream, meaning 'the bathing place of forest birds'.

Waikoukou Stream previously rose on the south-east slopes of Pukehinau Ridge after entering from Wellington Harbour's old shoreline near Boulcott Street. There is some debate around whether the name was meant to be Waikoko, 'tui stream', or whether the name should be translated as 'stream of the morepork' in reference to a pool along its course near Willis and Manners Street.

== Demographics ==
Kelburn, comprising the statistical areas of Wellington Botanic Gardens, Kelburn and Wellington University, covers 1.43 km^{2} (0.55 sq mi). It had an estimated population of 4,370 as of June 2025, with a population density of 3,056 people per km^{2}.

Historical population
Year	Pop.	±% p.a.
2006	4,287	—
2013	4,578	+0.94%
2018	4,770	+0.83%
2023	4,290	−2.10%

Kelburn had a population of 4,290 in the 2023 New Zealand census, a decrease of 480 people (−10.1%) since the 2018 census, and a decrease of 288 people (−6.3%) since the 2013 census. There were 1,869 males, 2,298 females, and 126 people of other genders in 1,401 dwellings. 17.3% of people identified as LGBTIQ+. The median age was 25.8 years (compared with 38.1 years nationally). There were 285 people (6.6%) aged under 15 years, 2,223 (51.8%) aged 15 to 29, 1,308 (30.5%) aged 30 to 64, and 477 (11.1%) aged 65 or older.

People could identify as more than one ethnicity. The results were 87.6% European (Pākehā); 8.3% Māori; 2.9% Pasifika; 10.1% Asian; 2.2% Middle Eastern, Latin American and African New Zealanders (MELAA); and 2.1% other, which includes people giving their ethnicity as "New Zealander". English was spoken by 98.9%, Māori by 2.1%, Samoan by 0.7%, and other languages by 19.0%. No language could be spoken by 0.5% (e.g. too young to talk). New Zealand Sign Language was known by 0.7%. The percentage of people born overseas was 30.4, compared with 28.8% nationally.

Religious affiliations were 23.4% Christian, 1.0% Hindu, 0.7% Islam, 0.1% Māori religious beliefs, 0.7% Buddhist, 0.6% New Age, 0.4% Jewish, and 1.7% other religions. People who answered that they had no religion were 66.4%, and 4.9% of people did not answer the census question.

Of those at least 15 years old, 2,037 (50.9%) people had a bachelor's or higher degree, 1,701 (42.5%) had a post-high school certificate or diploma, and 273 (6.8%) people exclusively held high school qualifications. The median income was $35,100, compared with $41,500 nationally. 798 people (19.9%) earned over $100,000 compared to 12.1% nationally. The employment status of those at least 15 was 1,779 (44.4%) full-time, 894 (22.3%) part-time, and 219 (5.5%) unemployed.

Individual statistical areas
Name	Area (km^{2})	Population	Density (per km^{2})	Dwellings	Median age	Median income
Wellington Botanic Gardens	0.52	933	1,794	273	23.1 years	$22,800
Kelburn	0.49	2,064	4,212	738	29.5 years	$48,700
Wellington University	0.42	1,293	3,079	393	23.9 years	$26,300
New Zealand					38.1 years	$41,500

Homes in the suburb are among the city's most valuable. As well as homeowners, residents of Kelburn include undergraduate and postgraduate students seeking to live in the vicinity of Victoria University.

== Education ==
Kelburn Normal School is a co-educational state primary school for Year 1 to 8 students, with a roll of 269 as of July 2026. The decile 10 school was founded in 1914 as a school for educating primary school teachers, and has a specialist music programme.

Clifton Terrace Model School is a co-educational state primary school for Year 1 to 8 students, with a roll of 78. Sources give its foundation year as 1869 or 1937.

Kelburn is within the enrolment zones for Wellington College, Wellington Girls' College and Wellington High School.

== Climate ==
Climate data for Kelburn (1928–2017, Humidity 1962–2017)
Month	Jan	Feb	Mar	Apr	May	Jun	Jul	Aug	Sep	Oct	Nov	Dec	Year
Record high °C (°F)	30.1 (86.2)	30.1 (86.2)	28.3 (82.9)	27.3 (81.1)	22.0 (71.6)	18.3 (64.9)	17.6 (63.7)	19.3 (66.7)	21.9 (71.4)	25.1 (77.2)	26.9 (80.4)	29.1 (84.4)	30.1 (86.2)
Mean daily maximum °C (°F)	20.1 (68.2)	20.3 (68.5)	19.0 (66.2)	16.6 (61.9)	14.0 (57.2)	11.9 (53.4)	11.1 (52.0)	11.9 (53.4)	13.4 (56.1)	15.0 (59.0)	16.7 (62.1)	18.7 (65.7)	15.7 (60.3)
Daily mean °C (°F)	16.6 (61.9)	16.8 (62.2)	15.7 (60.3)	13.7 (56.7)	11.3 (52.3)	9.3 (48.7)	8.5 (47.3)	9.1 (48.4)	10.5 (50.9)	11.9 (53.4)	13.4 (56.1)	15.3 (59.5)	12.7 (54.9)
Mean daily minimum °C (°F)	13.1 (55.6)	13.3 (55.9)	12.4 (54.3)	10.7 (51.3)	8.6 (47.5)	6.7 (44.1)	5.9 (42.6)	6.4 (43.5)	7.5 (45.5)	8.8 (47.8)	10.1 (50.2)	12.0 (53.6)	9.6 (49.3)
Record low °C (°F)	4.1 (39.4)	5.2 (41.4)	4.6 (40.3)	2.6 (36.7)	1.0 (33.8)	−0.1 (31.8)	0.0 (32.0)	−0.1 (31.8)	0.2 (32.4)	1.2 (34.2)	1.7 (35.1)	3.4 (38.1)	−0.1 (31.8)
Average rainfall mm (inches)	78.0 (3.07)	76.8 (3.02)	85.2 (3.35)	100.3 (3.95)	120.9 (4.76)	132.9 (5.23)	136.6 (5.38)	126.5 (4.98)	100.0 (3.94)	110.2 (4.34)	89.2 (3.51)	91.9 (3.62)	1,248.5 (49.15)
Average rainy days (≥ 1.0 mm)	7.3	6.9	8.2	9.4	11.6	13.4	13.4	13.1	11.2	11.4	9.5	9.0	124.4
Average relative humidity (%) (at 9am)	79.4	81.6	82.1	82.8	84.4	86.0	85.9	84.5	80.8	80.3	78.8	79.7	82.2
Mean monthly sunshine hours	239.0	205.3	194.0	153.8	125.9	102.6	112.0	136.8	162.1	191.5	210.7	223.4	2,057.1
Source: CliFlo

== Boundaries ==
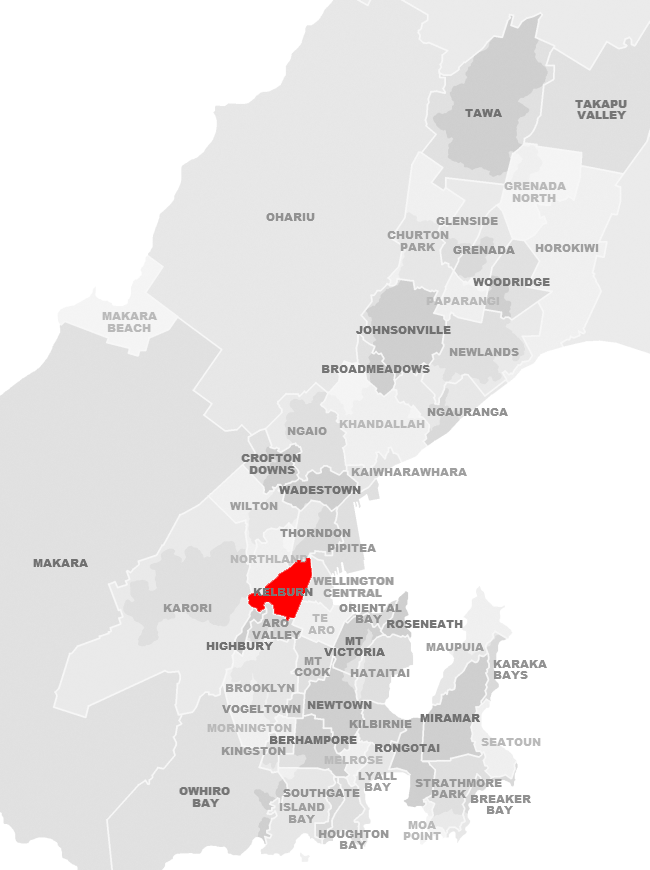
Kelburn in red.

Kelburn's boundaries form an approximate triangle, with the Terrace Tunnel and State Highway 1 defining the eastern boundary, Bowen Street (west of State Highway 1) and Glenmore Street defining the northwestern boundary, and the hills above Aro Valley forming the southern boundary.

== Notable people ==
The northern area of Kelburn near Parliament Buildings and between the Botanic Garden and Kelburn Park has been home to the Todd family, one of New Zealand's wealthiest families. Business leaders Sir Ron Trotter and Lloyd Morrison and prominent lawyers including Sir Kenneth Keith and Sir John McGrath lived in Kelburn. Prominent residents have also included politicians and public figures such as Sir Keith Holyoake and Sir Guy Powles.
