= Karori =

Suburb of Wellington City, New Zealand

- Suburb
- Central and eastern Karori from Wright Hill
- Interactive map of Karori
- Coordinates: 41°17′05″S 174°44′12″E
- Country: New Zealand
- City: Wellington
- Local authority: Wellington City Council
- Electoral ward: Wharangi/Onslow-Western; Te Whanganui-a-Tara Māori Ward
- Established: 1840

Area
  - Land: 628 ha (1,550 acres)

Population (June 2025)
  - Total: 15,100
  - Density: 2,400/km^{2} (6,230/sq mi)
- Postcode: 6012

Mākara		Wilton
	Karori	Northland
	Brooklyn	Highbury

Karori is a suburb located at the western edge of the urban area of Wellington, New Zealand, 4 kilometres (2.5 miles) from the city centre and is one of New Zealand's most populous suburbs, with a population of 15,100 in June 2025. No Māori lived in the area when the first European settlers came to Karori in the 1840s. The first settler in Karori cleared 20 acres of forest on his section with his younger brother Moses and advertised its sale in December 1841.

Amenities in Karori include a community garden, a library, a swimming pool, and several church buildings.

== History ==
=== Origins ===
The name Karori is a corruption of the Māori phrase te kaha o ngā rore meaning 'the place of many bird snares'. Originally forested, Māori used the Karori area for hunting. It also had tracks crossing it that led to Māori pā on the west coast.

No Māori lived in the area when the first European settlers came to Karori in the 1840s. Settlers bought land from the New Zealand Company, the area was included in their Port Nicholson Block deal. The first settler in Karori, John Yule of Glasgow, cleared 20 acres of forest on his section with his younger brother Moses and advertised its sale in December 1841. By 1845, ten 100-acre sections were being taken up and sub-divided, and Karori boasted 215 inhabitants – 109 of them under the age of 14 years.

In 1845 a group of armed police from Wellington constructed a small fortified post that became known as "The Stockade" in response to fears of attacks from nearby Māori insurgents. While there were no attacks, the stockade was used for a church service and to grind grain. The stockade was located on Mr Chapman's land, about halfway along what is now Marsden Avenue.

New Zealand's first lunatic asylum was based in Karori. Run by laypeople in a former house, Karori Lunatic Asylum opened in 1854. From the mid-1860s the asylum became increasingly overcrowded with patients who would be staying long term or for life. In 1872 the male and female staff leaders were replaced after an inquiry found they had been ill-treating patients. Karori asylum closed in 1873 when its 27 patients were moved to the newly built and larger Mount View Lunatic Asylum in Wellington city. In 1875 Karori School moved to the section formerly occupied by the asylum. Renamed Karori Normal School in 1968, it is still there today.

Frederick Mackie in his book Traveller under concern described Karori in the 1850s:

"The walk was highly romantic. The road is cut out of the sides of steep hills covered with forest. The ever-winding road, the steep declivities, the forest above and below you, and the continual murmur of streams concealed in the depths below were very pleasing, as every few yards a new scene and fresh objects were brought to view. In one spot I obtained a view of the harbour, which today was like a bright glassy lake, and beyond it were the lofty ranges of the snow-clad Rimutaka and Tararuas, partly glistening in the sun and partly shrouded in cloud."

=== Karori gold rush ===
Karori experienced a gold rush when the valley of the Upper Kaiwharawhara Stream became subject to intensive gold-mining activity between 1869 and 1873. This activity eventually led to the building of the lower Karori Dam (now part of Zealandia) in 1873. At the height of the rush, about 200 men worked the claims, driving shafts and drives up to 500 feet in length into the hills.

Karori remained isolated from the city due to the rough terrain and lack of transportation.

=== Growth and subdivision ===
In 1888 a syndicate purchased section 34, which was the closest to town (running from present day Ponsonby Road to Cooper Street). The new owners prepared the land for sale by building roads and naming them after the members of the syndicate and their families, and by running a marketing campaign, including providing free buses from Manners Street and writing poems:

In far-famed New Zealand, the evergreen free land
Most favoured and beautiful Queen of the wave,
Where the sun ever smiling, bad weather beguiling,
Brightly shines on the face of the honest and brave.
Tho' for Europe's bold races there are plenty of places
Adapted as homes for the great and the small,
Yet, for onward progressing and bountiful blessing
There is one whose position is far before all.
So haste where kind Nature's arrayed in her glory,
To pleasant, romantic, suburban Karori.

== Geography ==
The suburb of Karori is divided in two by a ridge which runs north-east to south-west and rises to an elevation of 356 m (1,168 feet) at Wright Hill (also spelt Wrights Hill).

North and west of the ridge is a basin with an elevation of 160 m (525 feet) at Karori Library in the civic centre. The basin is enclosed by another ridge between Johnston Hill at an elevation of 360 m (1,181 feet) and Mākara Hill at 412 m (1,352 feet), which is just outside the suburb. Karori Stream (Māori name: Waipahihi) rises in the suburb and flows south-east through the adjacent locality of Mākara into Cook Strait. In 2025 it was reported the rare native fish Shortjaw Kōkopu were found in the stream despite some pollution levels.

South and west of the Wright Hill ridge is a valley which is home to Zealandia (formerly Karori Wildlife Sanctuary). The valley is enclosed by another ridge above the adjacent suburb of Brooklyn. It is the southernmost catchment of Kaiwharawhara Stream which flows north-west into Wellington Harbour. The Karori section is the main head branch and is named Te Mahanga. It flows past Ōtari-Wilton's Bush to join the Korimako branch at the top of Kaiwharawhara gorge.

The Wellington Fault also runs through the Zealandia valley.

== Climate ==
Climate data for Karori (1971–1979)
Month	Jan	Feb	Mar	Apr	May	Jun	Jul	Aug	Sep	Oct	Nov	Dec	Year
Record high °C (°F)	30.3 (86.5)	27.3 (81.1)	23.4 (74.1)	22.7 (72.9)	19.2 (66.6)	18.2 (64.8)	15.5 (59.9)	16.2 (61.2)	21.0 (69.8)	19.3 (66.7)	23.5 (74.3)	25.4 (77.7)	30.3 (86.5)
Mean maximum °C (°F)	24.4 (75.9)	24.1 (75.4)	22.6 (72.7)	20.5 (68.9)	16.9 (62.4)	15.8 (60.4)	14.5 (58.1)	14.9 (58.8)	17.0 (62.6)	18.2 (64.8)	20.9 (69.6)	22.9 (73.2)	25.7 (78.3)
Mean daily maximum °C (°F)	19.7 (67.5)	19.7 (67.5)	18.5 (65.3)	16.5 (61.7)	13.5 (56.3)	11.4 (52.5)	11.0 (51.8)	11.5 (52.7)	12.5 (54.5)	14.3 (57.7)	16.3 (61.3)	18.1 (64.6)	15.3 (59.5)
Daily mean °C (°F)	15.9 (60.6)	15.6 (60.1)	15.0 (59.0)	12.8 (55.0)	10.2 (50.4)	7.9 (46.2)	7.5 (45.5)	8.1 (46.6)	9.3 (48.7)	10.8 (51.4)	12.8 (55.0)	14.6 (58.3)	11.7 (53.1)
Mean daily minimum °C (°F)	12.0 (53.6)	11.5 (52.7)	11.4 (52.5)	9.1 (48.4)	6.8 (44.2)	4.3 (39.7)	3.9 (39.0)	4.6 (40.3)	6.0 (42.8)	7.3 (45.1)	9.3 (48.7)	11.1 (52.0)	8.1 (46.6)
Mean minimum °C (°F)	5.0 (41.0)	4.6 (40.3)	2.7 (36.9)	0.5 (32.9)	−1.2 (29.8)	−3.0 (26.6)	−3.4 (25.9)	−2.7 (27.1)	−1.4 (29.5)	0.1 (32.2)	2.1 (35.8)	4.6 (40.3)	−4.1 (24.6)
Record low °C (°F)	1.7 (35.1)	1.4 (34.5)	0.5 (32.9)	−4.7 (23.5)	−4.2 (24.4)	−5.5 (22.1)	−4.7 (23.5)	−4.4 (24.1)	−2.9 (26.8)	−1.9 (28.6)	−0.7 (30.7)	3.6 (38.5)	−5.5 (22.1)
Average rainfall mm (inches)	89 (3.5)	89 (3.5)	109 (4.3)	127 (5.0)	162 (6.4)	165 (6.5)	173 (6.8)	166 (6.5)	128 (5.0)	120 (4.7)	106 (4.2)	108 (4.3)	1,542 (60.7)
Source: NIWA (rainfall 1951–1980

== Governance ==
=== Karori Borough, 1891–1920 ===
Karori was a part of Hutt County from the county's establishment in 1877 to 1891 when Karori was declared a separate borough following a petition in favour of forming a borough with 123 signatories. A counter-petition garnered 41 signatories.

==== List of mayors of Karori Borough ====
No.	Name	Term
1	Stephen Lancaster	October 1892 – December 1894
2	Richard Bulkley	December 1894 – April 1900
3	Francis John McDonald	April 1900 – November 1901
4	Everard Cecil Farr	November 1901 – May 1902
5	James Bock Tarr	May 1902 – April 1903
6	William Henry Tisdall	April 1903 – May 1904
7	Archibald Cameron Pearce	May 1904 – May 1908
8	Cyril Irwin Dasent	May 1908 – May 1911
9	Charles Cathie	May 1911 – May 1914
10	William Thomas Hildreth	May 1914 – May 1915
11	Benjamin George H. Burn	May 1915 – April 1920

=== Amalgamation with Wellington, 1920 ===
Both Wellington and Karori expanded towards each other, the two urban areas becoming gradually connected, aided by the opening of the Karori tunnel in 1900, and the Borough of Karori amalgamated with the City of Wellington in 1920.

== Demographics ==
Karori, comprising the statistical areas of Karori Park, Karori West, Karori North, Karori South and Karori East, covers 6.28 km^{2} (2.42 sq mi). It had an estimated population of 15,100 as of June 2025, with a population density of 2,404 people per km^{2}.

Historical population
Year	Pop.	±% p.a.
2006	14,004	—
2013	14,679	+0.67%
2018	15,231	+0.74%
2023	14,769	−0.61%

Karori had a population of 14,769 in the 2023 New Zealand census, a decrease of 462 people (−3.0%) since the 2018 census, and an increase of 90 people (0.6%) since the 2013 census. There were 7,146 males, 7,431 females, and 192 people of other genders in 5,334 dwellings. 7.3% of people identified as LGBTIQ+. The median age was 39.2 years (compared with 38.1 years nationally). There were 2,649 people (17.9%) aged under 15 years, 3,084 (20.9%) aged 15 to 29, 6,978 (47.2%) aged 30 to 64, and 2,055 (13.9%) aged 65 or older.

People could identify as more than one ethnicity. The results were 75.0% European (Pākehā); 6.7% Māori; 3.8% Pasifika; 20.6% Asian; 3.0% Middle Eastern, Latin American and African New Zealanders (MELAA); and 1.9% other, which includes people giving their ethnicity as "New Zealander". English was spoken by 96.4%, Māori by 2.0%, Samoan by 1.1%, and other languages by 24.2%. No language could be spoken by 1.7% (e.g. too young to talk). New Zealand Sign Language was known by 0.6%. The percentage of people born overseas was 35.1, compared with 28.8% nationally.

Religious affiliations were 28.2% Christian, 2.9% Hindu, 1.6% Islam, 0.2% Māori religious beliefs, 1.8% Buddhist, 0.4% New Age, 0.5% Jewish, and 1.5% other religions. People who answered that they had no religion were 58.0%, and 4.9% of people did not answer the census question.

Of those at least 15 years old, 6,567 (54.2%) people had a bachelor's or higher degree, 4,101 (33.8%) had a post-high school certificate or diploma, and 1,443 (11.9%) people exclusively held high school qualifications. The median income was $58,300, compared with $41,500 nationally. 3,447 people (28.4%) earned over $100,000 compared to 12.1% nationally. The employment status of those at least 15 was 6,834 (56.4%) full-time, 1,749 (14.4%) part-time, and 285 (2.4%) unemployed.

Individual statistical areas
Name	Area (km^{2})	Population	Density (per km^{2})	Dwellings	Median age	Median income
Karori Park	1.16	2,556	2,203	927	37.1 years	$54,500
Karori West	1.06	2,718	2,564	1,017	36.1 years	$52,200
Karori North	1.62	2,568	1,585	942	41.0 years	$65,400
Karori South	1.21	3,462	2,861	1,224	38.8 years	$59,400
Karori East	1.23	3,459	2,812	1,221	43.6 years	$61,700
New Zealand					38.1 years	$41,500

== Facilities ==
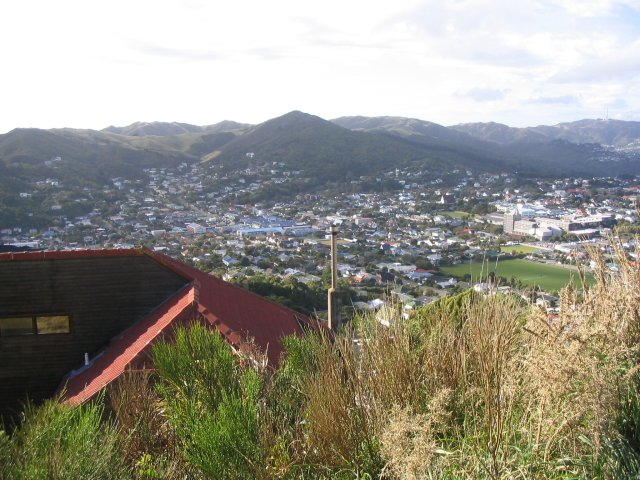
City-end Karori from Wrights Hill

=== Parks and reserves ===
Zealandia (formerly called the Karori Wildlife Sanctuary) is an enclosed restoration project focusing on the flora and fauna that inhabited the valley before human settlement.

Karori Park, on Karori Road features a football and cricket sports ground, all-weather track, changing rooms and play area.

Ben Burn Park, on Campbell Street features a football and cricket sports ground, changing rooms, athletics, play area and artificial cricket surfaces.

Wrights Hill Reserve in southern Karori features mountain bike and walking tracks and the historic Wrights Hill Fortress with a network of tunnels and gun emplacements overlooking the valley. Opposite is Johnston Hill which is the southern end of Te Wharangi ridge extending to Mt Kaukau. Land was purchased on Johnsons Hill in 1942 by people who wanted to reserve some space for birdlife. Two groups fundraised, The Karori Progressive Association and the Wellington Beautifying Society, they were also were supported by the Wellington City Council in the purchase. There is a loop track on Johnson's Hill, at the top there are views of city and the south coast.

Mākara Peak Mountain Bike Park in southern Karori has over 40 km (25 mi) of mountain bike and walking tracks built by the mountain biking community and is recognised as a world-class area dedicated to mountain biking.

=== Karori pool ===
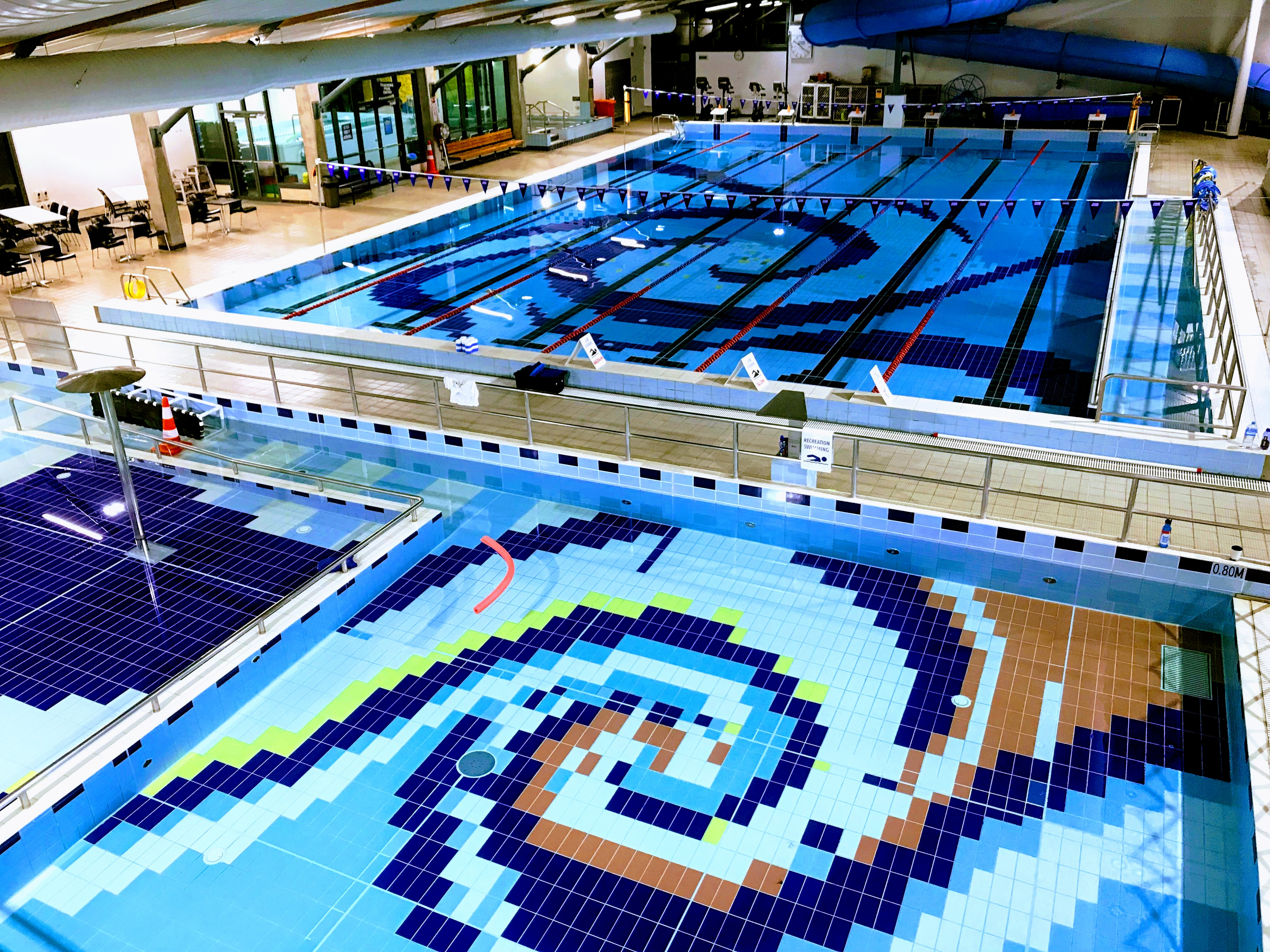
Interior of Karori swimming pool showing the children's pool in the foreground and the main 25m lane pool at the rear

Karori pool is a modern indoor swimming complex with a 25-metre heated pool, learners' pool, toddlers' pool, spa pool and a 30-metre hydro-slide. The pool was originally an outdoor facility first opened in 1936. The pool was converted to an indoor pool in 2001 and additional work in 2010 added the hydro-slide. The pool is home to the Karori Pirates swimming club.

=== Library and recreation centre ===
Karori Library entrance

Karori Library opened in the 1840s, operating out of the community hall at the site of the present day library on Karori Road. In November 2005, the current two-level library and café were opened. The architects were Warren and Mahoney and the building received critical acclaim receiving this review in Architecture New Zealand: "The Karori library is a box of light that shines brightly in an overcast suburb. The relationship to the street is a model for all those who design for the outer city."

Karori Recreation Centre is a multi-purpose community facility located next to the library and managed by the Wellington City Council. It mostly runs a range of physical activity sessions for children and adults.

=== Community garden ===
The Karori Community Garden was founded in 2015 by Paul Stevenson. It is located at 21 Beauchamp Street, behind the Beauchamp Street Chapel.

=== Churches and cemeteries ===
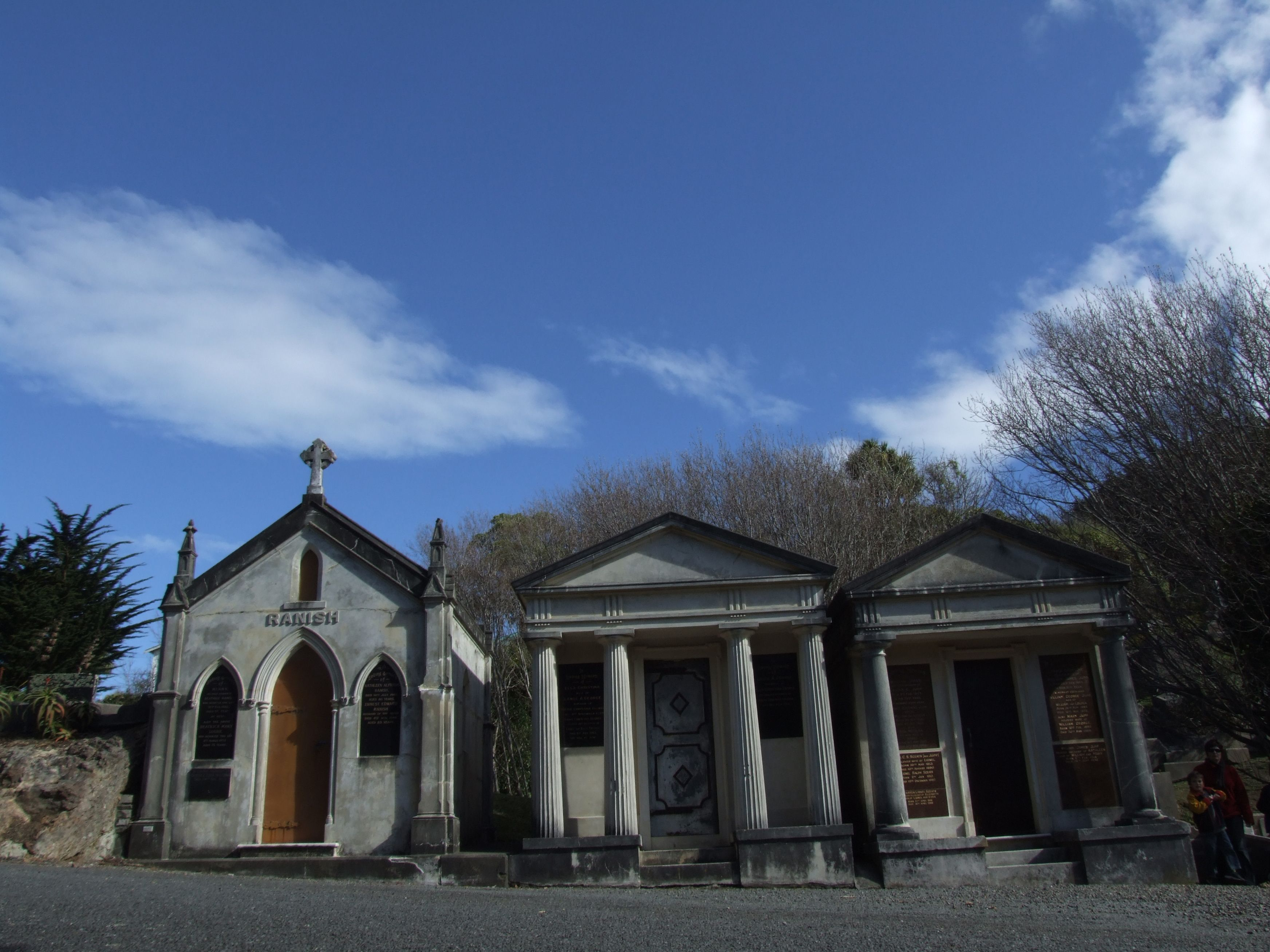
Mausoleums at Karori Cemetery

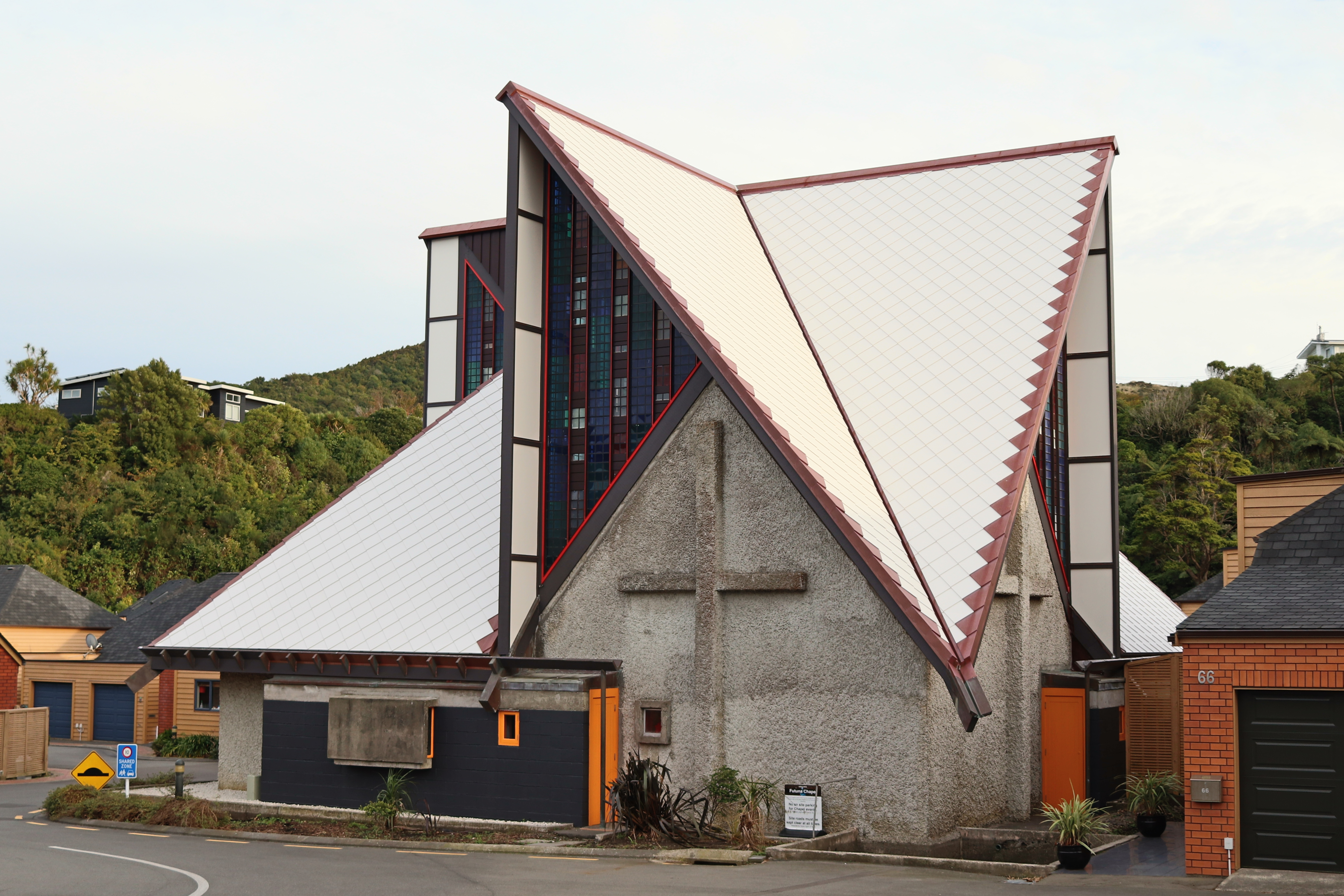
Futuna Chapel from Friend Street

Karori Cemetery is the second-largest in New Zealand. Opened in 1891, it replaced the cemetery at Bolton Street as the main burial ground for the inhabitants of Wellington. The Karori Crematorium, opened in 1909, was the first crematorium in New Zealand. It covers 100 acres / 40 hectares. The Small Chapel contains excellent stained glass windows designed by Wilhelmina Geddes. The cemetery contains the war graves of 267 Commonwealth service personnel of World War I and 123 of World War II, in separate plots for each war, the plots being linked by the Wellington Provincial Memorial (in the form of a marble archway) which commemorates 65 World War I and 20 World War II military personnel from the Wellington Military District who died abroad and have no known grave (most were buried at sea). Karori Cemetery "closed" in 1965 for the establishment of new burial plots, but interments in established graves continue.

Futuna Chapel, built in 1961 by the Society of Mary, was awarded New Zealand Institute of Architects Gold medal for best building in 1968. The chapel was deconsecrated in 2000 and was sold to a property developer who planned to clear the section for residential development. The building was saved when it was listed as a heritage building and is being restored by a Charitable Trust.

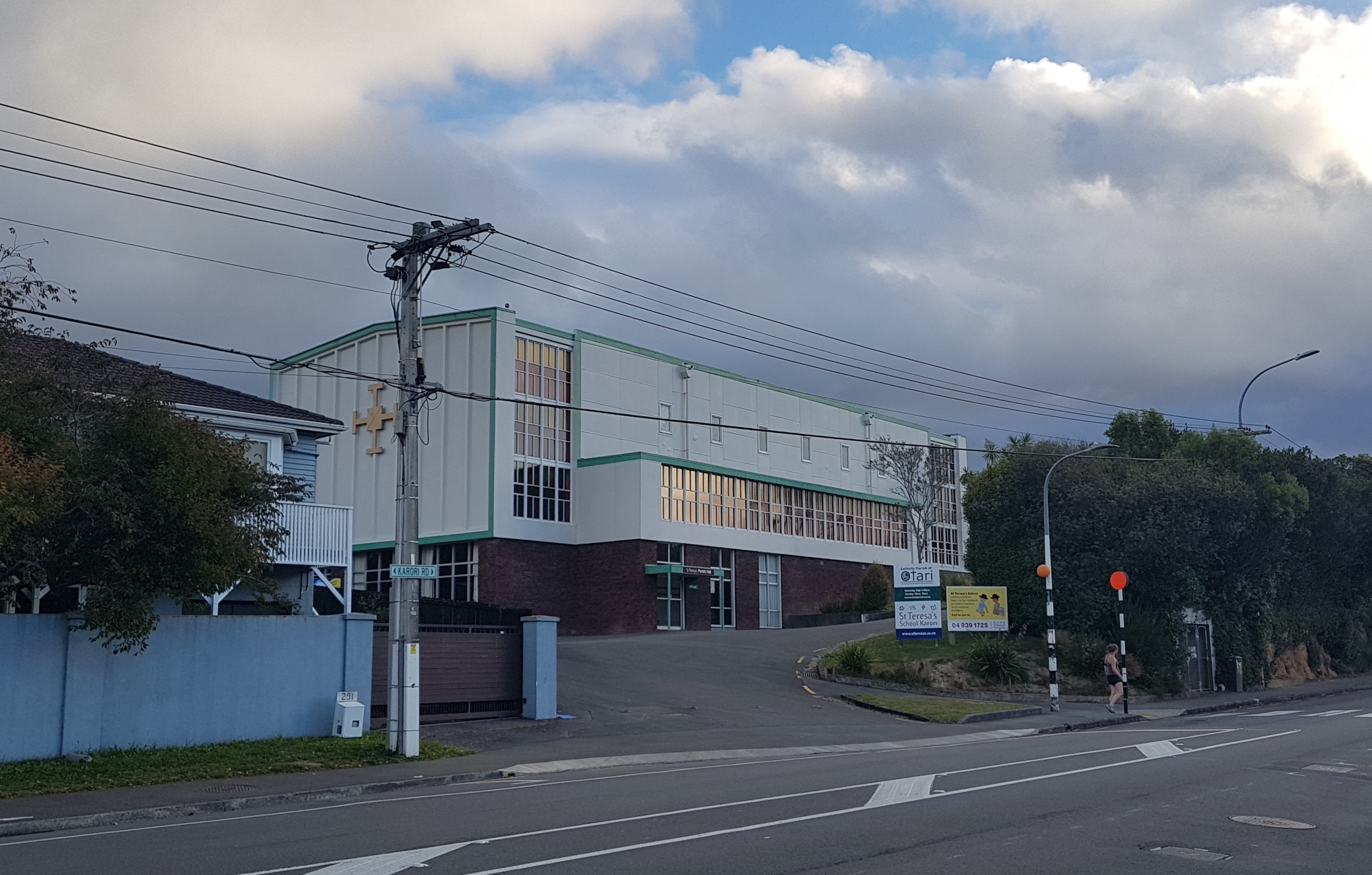
St Teresa's Church from Karori Road

Other churches in Karori include:

- Karori Anglican Church
- Karori Baptist Church
- Catholic Church St Theresa
- St Anselm's Union Church
- St Ninian's Uniting
- St Mary's Anglican Church

== Clubs, societies and sports ==
=== Arts ===
Karori has a membership arts and crafts centre who run courses and meet in the Newman Building, behind the Karori Library. There are a number of dance schools that run classes in Karori. The events centre is not currently open but will provide facilities for concerts and events.

=== Karori Historical Society ===
Karori Historical Society is one of many historical societies of Aotearoa New Zealand, membership application is open to all residents and citizens of New Zealand. The activities include publishing books about the history of Karori and there are many titles listed on their website for example Karori and its People and Karori Streets 1841–1991.

=== Sports ===
Waterside Karori association football club founded when Karori Swifts and Waterside (a club based in Kaiwharawhara) merged. Other sports includes the Karori United Tennis Club, the Karori Amateur Athletics Club, Karori Cricket Club, Karori Netball Club, and the Karori Bowling Club.

== Public transport ==
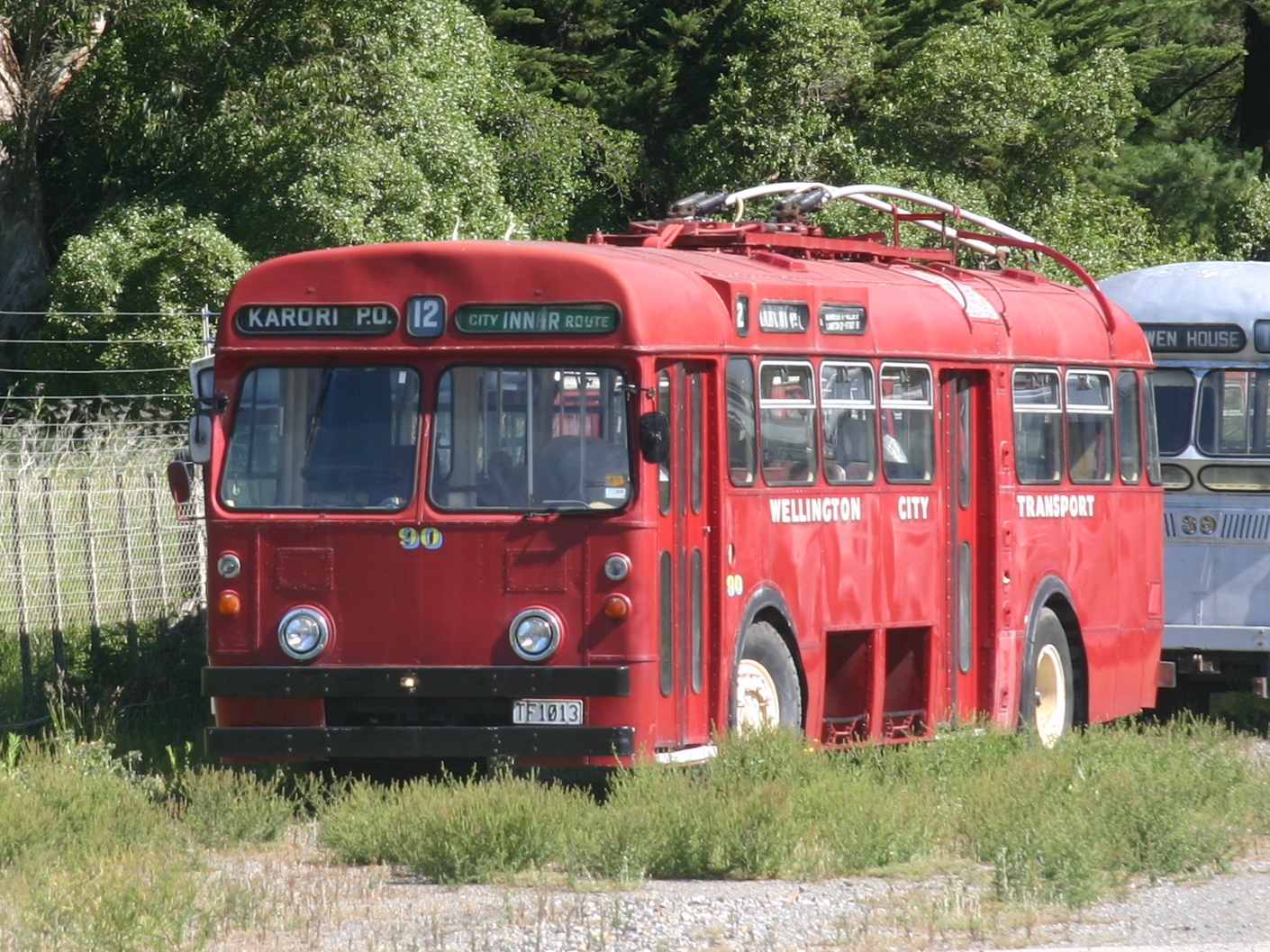
Retired red Wellington trolley bus 'Karori Park number 12'

Until 31 October 2017, the full length of Karori Road was served by the Karori Park trolley bus route, which replaced the former tram service in 1954. For many years vehicles on this route ran as Route 12 to Courtenay Place, but are now designated as Route 2 and through-routed via the city – alternating between Miramar and Seatoun as destinations. The weekday seven-minute service is the most-frequent of all Wellington routes. Other routes serving the suburb are Route 18e which runs through Kelburn to Miramar via Massey University; Route 21 which runs up Beauchamp St and down Birdwood St, to and from Courtenay Place; peak-time Route 37 which runs the 21 route to The Terrace, then via Bowen St and Featherston St to Brandon St; peak-time Route 33 from Karori South to and from Brandon St and peak-time Route 34 which runs from Karori West to and from Brandon St – with an hourly service from Karori South just to and from Karori Mall during the day.

Electric buses were introduced on Route 2 in August 2021.

== Education ==
=== School enrolment zone ===
Karori is within the enrolment zones for St Patrick's College, Wellington, Wellington College, Wellington Girls' College, Wellington High School, Samuel Marsden, Karori West Normal School, and Karori Normal School.

=== Wellington Teachers' Training College ===
Stage one of purpose built faculties to hold the Wellington Teachers' Training College were complete in 1969 on the site 26–40 Donald Street. It has a rich history with many notable New Zealanders attended and teaching there. Other names include the Wellington College of Education. This campus was the home of Victoria University of Wellington Faculty of Education briefly with some controversy until 2016 when the Faculty moved to the Kelburn campus. Ryman Healthcare purchased the site in 2017 with the intention of developing a retirement village on the site. This project did not proceed and the site was sold to Gibbons Co. who started construction of a residential estate to be known as Campbell Village.

=== Public primary schools ===
Karori Normal School is a co-educational state primary school for Year 1 to 8 students, with a roll of 594 as of July 2026. It was founded in 1857 and is the second-largest full primary school in New Zealand. It has an artificial turf, two playgrounds, 35 classrooms in approximately four buildings, a concrete field, and a grass field. The author Katherine Mansfield attended the school from 1895 to 1898 and there is a memorial to her at the school on a concrete field called the Katherine Mansfield field, located in front of a tree she wrote about in one of her stories.

Karori West Normal School is a co-educational state primary school for Year 1 to 8 students, with a roll of 437. It opened in 1932. The schools Māori language name is Te Kura o Waipahihi and derised from the Māori name of Karori Stream which is Waipahihi. It runs alongside the campus.

Karori Normal School and Karori West Normal School have the name 'Normal' due to a relationship with the education of teacher, Normal Schools come from the French phrase ecole normale. There are other two Normal Schools in Wellington, Kelburn Normal School and Raroa Normal Intermediate School, and all work with Victoria University to support teacher training.

=== Christian schools ===
Samuel Marsden Collegiate School is a composite private Anglican girls' school on Karori Road in Marsden Village. It offers classes from new entrants to Year 13. It had a roll of 391 as of July 2026. It opened in 1878 as Fitzherbert Terrace School. The Anglican Diocese of Wellington bought it in 1920, moved it to Karori and renamed it.

St Teresa's School is a co-educational state-integrated Catholic school for Year 1 to 8 students, with a roll of 125 as of July 2026. It opened in 1939, although classes had been held at St Theresa's Church from 1927, and earlier at private homes.

=== Preschools ===
There are a number of preschool education providers in Karori, including Playcentre and kindergartens.

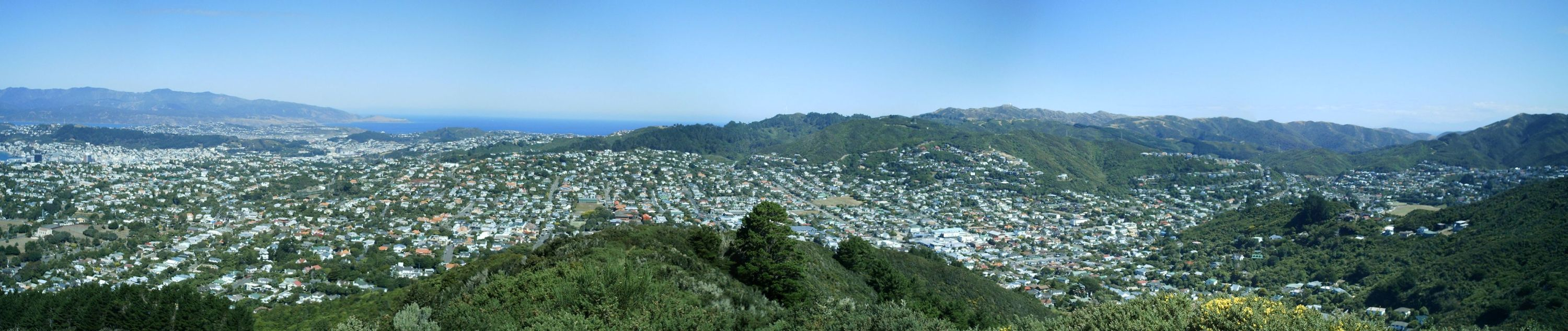
Karori from Johnston Hill

== Notable people ==
- Katherine Mansfield (1888–1923), novelist
- George Friend (1835–1898), parliamentary official
- Duncan Oughton, football player
- George Hudson (entomologist)
- Tom Young (trade unionist)
- Harold Beauchamp, chairman of the Bank of New Zealand, father to Katherine Mansfield
- Daisy Platts-Mills, doctor and community leader
- Colin McLeod (engineer)
- Samuel Duncan Parnell, activist
- Diana Mason (doctor)
- Bryan Waddle, sports broadcaster
- E. Mervyn Taylor: artist
