= Highbury, Wellington =

Highbury
- Suburb
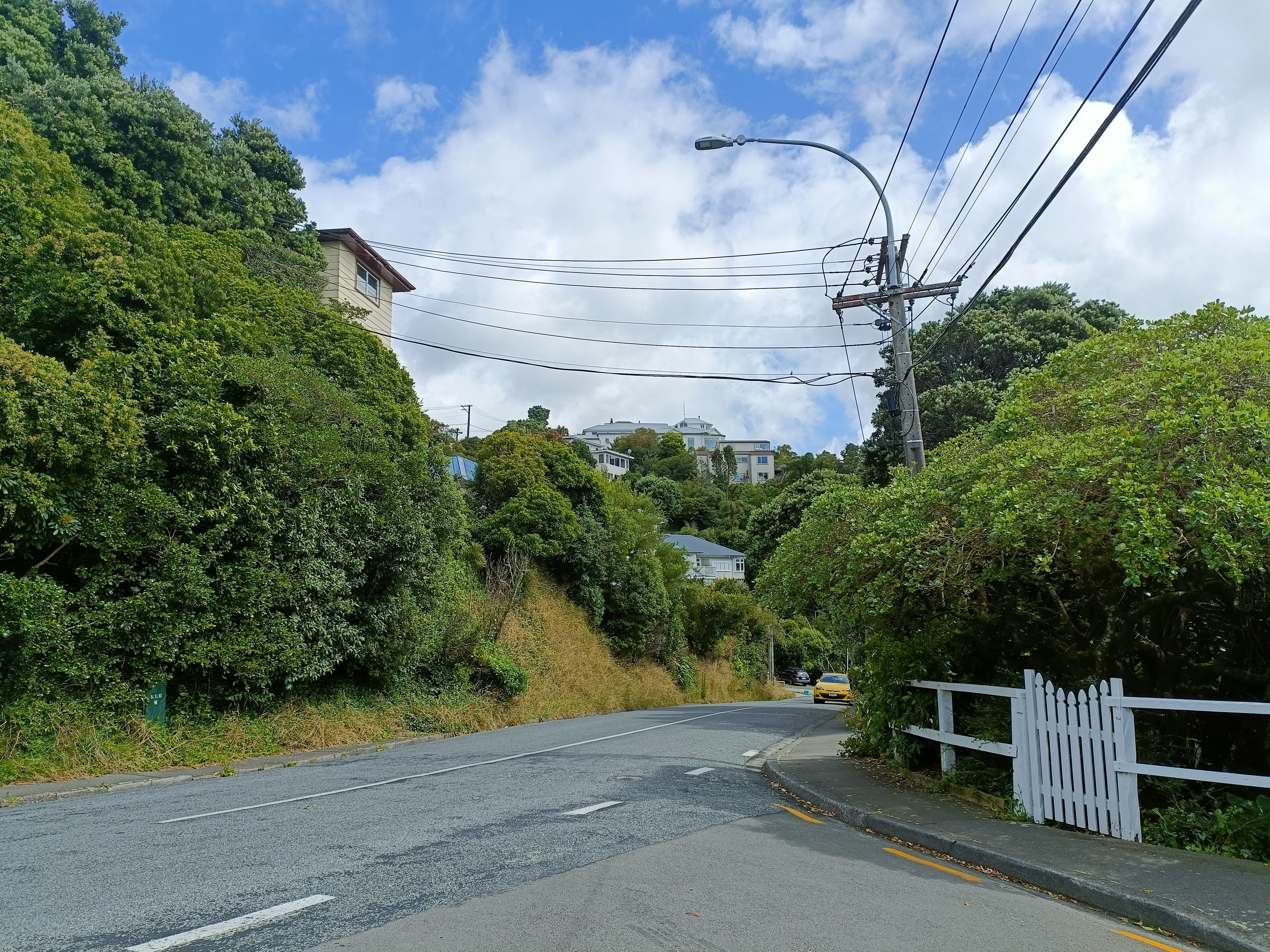
- Interactive map of Highbury
- Coordinates: 41°17′34.8″S 174°45′25.2″E
- Country: New Zealand
- City: Wellington City
- Local authority: Wellington City Council
- Electoral ward: Pukehīnau/Lambton Ward; Te Whanganui-a-Tara Māori Ward

Area
  - Land: 6 ha (15 acres)

Population (2023 census)
  - Total: 213
  - Density: 3,600/km^{2} (9,200/sq mi)
- Postcode: 6012

Highbury is a suburb of Wellington, the capital city of New Zealand, under the governance of Wellington City Council. Highbury is located west of Brooklyn and Aro Valley.

== History ==
Thomas and Mary Forgham, who arrived in New Zealand in 1864, named the area after Highbury in Birmingham, England.

== Demographics ==
Highbury covers 0.06 km^{2} (0.023 sq mi). It is part of the Aro Valley statistical area.

Historical population
Year	Pop.	±% p.a.
2013	210	—
2018	243	+2.96%
2023	213	−2.60%

Highbury had a population of 213 in the 2023 New Zealand census, a decrease of 30 people (−12.3%) since the 2018 census, and an increase of 3 people (1.4%) since the 2013 census. There were 96 males, 111 females, and 6 people of other genders in 87 dwellings. 9.9% of people identified as LGBTIQ+. There were 30 people (14.1%) aged under 15 years, 75 (35.2%) aged 15 to 29, 81 (38.0%) aged 30 to 64, and 27 (12.7%) aged 65 or older.

People could identify as more than one ethnicity. The results were 91.5% European (Pākehā); 7.0% Māori; 12.7% Asian; and 1.4% Middle Eastern, Latin American and African New Zealanders (MELAA). English was spoken by 98.6%, Māori by 1.4%, and other languages by 21.1%. No language could be spoken by 1.4% (e.g. too young to talk). The percentage of people born overseas was 26.8, compared with 28.8% nationally.

Religious affiliations were 12.7% Christian, 1.4% Buddhist, and 1.4% other religions. People who answered that they had no religion were 78.9%, and 4.2% of people did not answer the census question.

Of those at least 15 years old, 108 (59.0%) people had a bachelor's or higher degree, 66 (36.1%) had a post-high school certificate or diploma, and 9 (4.9%) people exclusively held high school qualifications. 60 people (32.8%) earned over $100,000 compared to 12.1% nationally. The employment status of those at least 15 was 114 (62.3%) full-time, 24 (13.1%) part-time, and 6 (3.3%) unemployed.
