= Silston Cory-Wright =

New Zealand engineer

Silston Cory-Wright MC AMICE (22 September 1888 – 3 March 1976) was an English-born New Zealand engineer, university lecturer, soldier, and company director.

== Early life ==
Silston Cory-Wright was born at Sigglesthorne Hall, Hornsea, Yorkshire, England, on 22 September 1888. He was the son of George Henry Cory Wright and his wife, Ellen Green Wade. The grandson of Sir William Wright, the double-barrelled surname came about as a result of a disagreement between George's side of the family and his half-siblings.

During his early years, Cory-Wright's mother taught him several foreign languages, including German, which proved to be useful in later life. His father spent much of his time managing the family's estates, the income from which had been largely invested in Canada, and in particular the Canadian Pacific Railway. Heavy losses in these investments in the 1890s influenced the family's decision to move from England. After living in Norway, Jamaica and Morocco for a number of years, the family returned to live in England.

== Early engineering career ==
Cory-Wright had trained as a design draftsman and spent two years at the University of Birmingham. In 1905, he moved to Zurich in Switzerland to undertake an engineering apprenticeship with Escher Wyss and Company. During this time, he also followed his passion of mountaineering in the Swiss Alps, while studying for a BSc in engineering from London University. During this time, he supervised the installation and commissioning of Escher Wyss equipment at Kinlochleven power station for Britain's first aluminium smelter at Fort William, in Scotland. By 1910, he had become an associate member of the Institution of Civil Engineers, London.

== Hydro-electric engineering work ==
While Cory-Wright was working in Zurich designing turbines, a senior engineer with the New Zealand Public Works Department visited the company, and Cory-Wright was asked to show him the Albula hydroelectric station, a major engineering project in the area. This was a similar power station to that planned for the first hydroelectric station to be built by the New Zealand Government, at Lake Coleridge in the South Island.

In 1912, Cory-Wright decided to emigrate to New Zealand, having accepted an appointment as a lecturer in the new associateship in engineering course at Auckland University College. Between 1913 and 1923, he negotiated the sale of the first six Lake Coleridge turbines, which were based on the Albula design. When the German-born Swiss engineer that had been contracted to install the turbines was interned by the New Zealand Government at the beginning of the First World War, Cory-Wright was asked to supervise the installation and maintenance of the initial three units.

== First World War ==
In November 1915, he joined the Corps of New Zealand Engineers, and by 1916 had served in both Egypt and France. Owing to his fluency in the German language, he was seconded in early 1917 as an intelligence officer to the New Zealand Division in France. By the end of the war, he had been promoted to the rank of captain and had won the Military Cross for frontline duties.

== Formation of Cory-Wright and Salmon ==
After the war, Cory-Wright returned to university lecturing in Auckland. It was in 1920 that he joined Cedric Salmon, a fellow officer in the Engineers, in founding the engineering firm Cory-Wright and Salmon. The business was based on the partners' contacts with major British firms, such as Vickers and English Electric, but also represented over 50 other large international engineering companies. It supplied a considerable diversity of engineering equipment, with a particular focus on railways. Examples included: electrical components for the Lyttelton-Christchurch line (1928), electric train units for the Wellington-Johnsonville line (1938), and electric locomotives for the main trunk line beginning with Wellington-Paekakariki (1939–40).

Contracts were also secured through Cory-Wright's interest in hydro-electric development. On behalf of Cory-Wright and Salmon, he supervised the installation of Escher Wyss turbines at Lake Coleridge, and many hydroelectric units for English Electric. By the 1950s, he had been associated with every significant South Island hydro-electric power station and several in the North Island.

His engineering experience was also acknowledged in Australia. In the 1930s, he advised on remedial measures after a major hydraulic failure in a Tasmania project.

He remained closely involved with the firm he co-founded until his death in 1976. After his retirement, Cory-Wright and Salmon remained well known for its engineering work in prominent New Zealand engineering projects: in partnership with Swiss firm Habegger AG on the Wellington Cable Car, the Ohaaki geothermal power scheme north of Taupo, and the commissioning of the British Aircraft Corporation Strikemaster fighter for the Royal New Zealand Air Force.

== Personal life and family ==
Cory-Wright was married in Auckland on 4 December 1924 to Jean Isobel MacLennan. From 1928 until his death, the couple lived in the historic crescent-shaped Wadestown residence, 'Goldie's Brae', a former private hospital. This property housed a large grapevine in its conservatory. This residence was used in a scene for the historical 1977 television drama "The Governor", an historical drama mini-series based on a biography of Governor George Grey, featuring Corin Redgrave in the title role.

In 1924, while on holiday, Cory-Wright rescued a non-swimmer in the sea off Tairua, Coromandel, after a fishing accident. He kept the man alive in the water for several hours before help could be summoned. Cory-Wright was awarded a Royal Humane Society of New Zealand bravery medal, in recognition of his actions.

Cory-Wright died in Wellington on 3 March 1976, and was survived by two sons.

== Sources ==
- Cory-Wright, S. 'The construction and commissioning of Lake Coleridge power scheme in 1914'. New Zealand Engineering 31, No 9 (15 Sep 1976): 221–223
- Extracts from the recollections of an engineer The construction and commissioning of Lake Coleridge power scheme in 1914. Cory-Wright, S. 31(9) Page 221
- 'A democracy that works...The story of Cory-Wright & Salmon Ltd'. New Zealand Electrical Journal 22, No 4 (25 April 1949): 364–367
- Obit. New Zealand Energy Journal 49, No 4 (25 April 1976): 62
- "History Milestones". Andritz. Archived from the original on 7 July 2011.
