= James Mackenzie =

James (or Jim or Jamie) Mackenzie (or McKenzie) may refer to:

== Sports ==
- Jim Mackenzie (American football) (1930–1967), football coach
- James McKenzie (boxer) (1903–1931), British boxer
- Jim McKenzie (footballer) (1877–?), Scottish-born footballer who played for Burton Swifts and Southampton in the 1890s
- Jamie McKenzie (footballer, born 1980), Scottish-born football midfielder whose clubs have included Partick Thistle and Albion Rovers
- Jamie McKenzie (footballer, born 1986), Scottish-born football defender who has played for clubs in Scotland, Ireland and Cyprus
- Jamie Mackenzie (born 1989), Canadian rugby union player
- Jim McKenzie (ice hockey) (born 1969), Canadian ice hockey player whose teams included Hartford Whalers, Phoenix Coyotes and New Jersey Devils
- James MacKenzie (rugby union) (1886–1963), Scottish international rugby union player
- Jamie Mackenzie (tennis) (born 2008), German tennis player

== Other people ==
- James MacKenzie (VC) (1889–1914), Scottish recipient of the Victoria Cross
- Sir James Mackenzie (cardiologist) (1853–1925), Scottish cardiologist
- James A. McKenzie (1840–1904), U.S. Representative from Kentucky
- James A. McKenzie (Wisconsin politician), American businessman and politician
- James Mckenzie (outlaw) (1820–?), Scottish-born New Zealand outlaw
- James Mackenzie (actor) (born 1979), Scottish actor who presents the children's game show Raven
- James McKenzie (Manitoba politician) (1854–1936), politician in Manitoba, Canada
- James McKenzie (Australian politician) (1867–1939)
- James Cameron Mackenzie (1852–1931), American educator
- James Hewat McKenzie (1869–1929), British parapsychologist
- Kenzie (James MacKenzie, born 1986), British rapper
- James Hutton Mackenzie (1849–1949), New Zealand Presbyterian minister
- James Stuart-Mackenzie (c. 1719–1800), Scottish politician
- James B. McKenzie (1926–2002), American theater producer
- James George Mackenzie, Royal Navy officer and governor of the Falkland Islands
- James Mackenzie, Lord Royston (1671–1744), Scottish judge
