= Wadestown, New Zealand =

Suburb of Wellington City, New Zealand

Wadestown
- Suburb
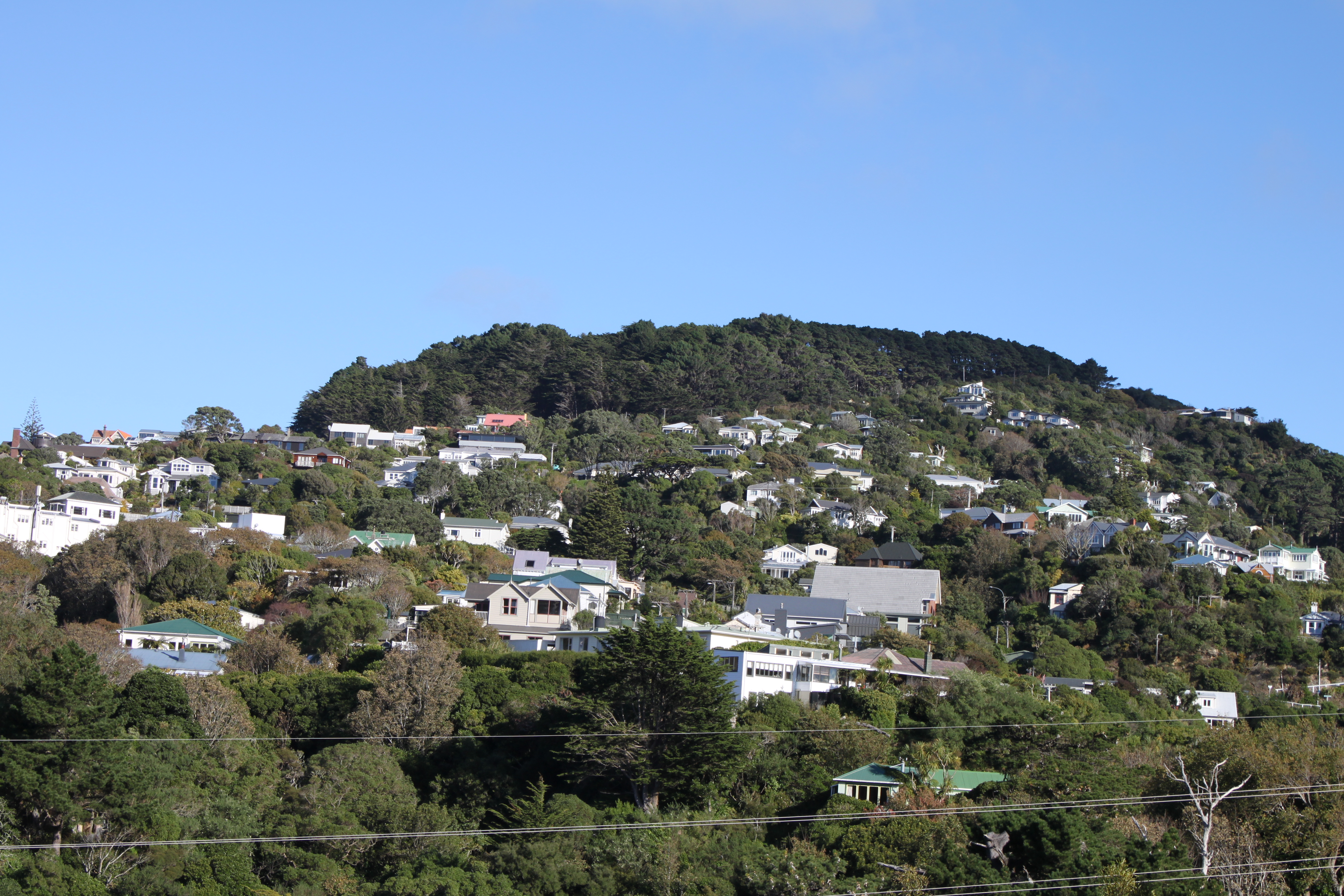
- Wadestown and Te Ahumairangi Hill, looking from Ngaio
- Interactive map of Wadestown
- Coordinates: 41°15′43″S 174°46′25″E
- Country: New Zealand
- City: Wellington City
- Local authority: Wellington City Council
- Electoral ward: Wharangi/Onslow-Western; Te Whanganui-a-Tara Māori Ward

Area
  - Land: 144 ha (360 acres)

Population (June 2025)
  - Total: 3,740
  - Density: 2,600/km^{2} (6,730/sq mi)

Crofton Downs	Ngaio
	Wadestown	Kaiwharawhara
Wilton	Thorndon

Wadestown is a northern suburb of Wellington, (the capital city of New Zealand) located about 2–3 km (1.2–1.9 mi) by road from the Wellington central business district and the New Zealand Parliament Buildings.

It is a residential suburb overlooking Thorndon and the Ngaio Gorge from the northern flanks of Te Ahumairangi Hill (formerly Tinakori Hill). The suburb is hilly and includes Weld Street reportedly one of the steepest streets in Wellington. Wadestown's streets are picturesque and narrow — 10 metres (33 feet), half a chain, made by pick and shovel and horse and scoop.

== Establishment ==
Wadestown was Wellington's first suburb. It takes its name from John Wade who arrived in Wellington in 1840 on the vessel Integrity. In 1841, together with another early settler, James Watt, he acquired land in the area now known as Wadestown and divided it into one and two-acre lots. South and east boundaries Wade Street and Watt Street carry their names.

== Demographics ==
Wadestown statistical area covers 1.44 km^{2} (0.56 sq mi). It had an estimated population of 3,740 as of June 2025, with a population density of 2,597 people per km^{2}.

Historical population
Year	Pop.	±% p.a.
2006	3,549	—
2013	3,516	−0.13%
2018	3,753	+1.31%
2023	3,696	−0.31%

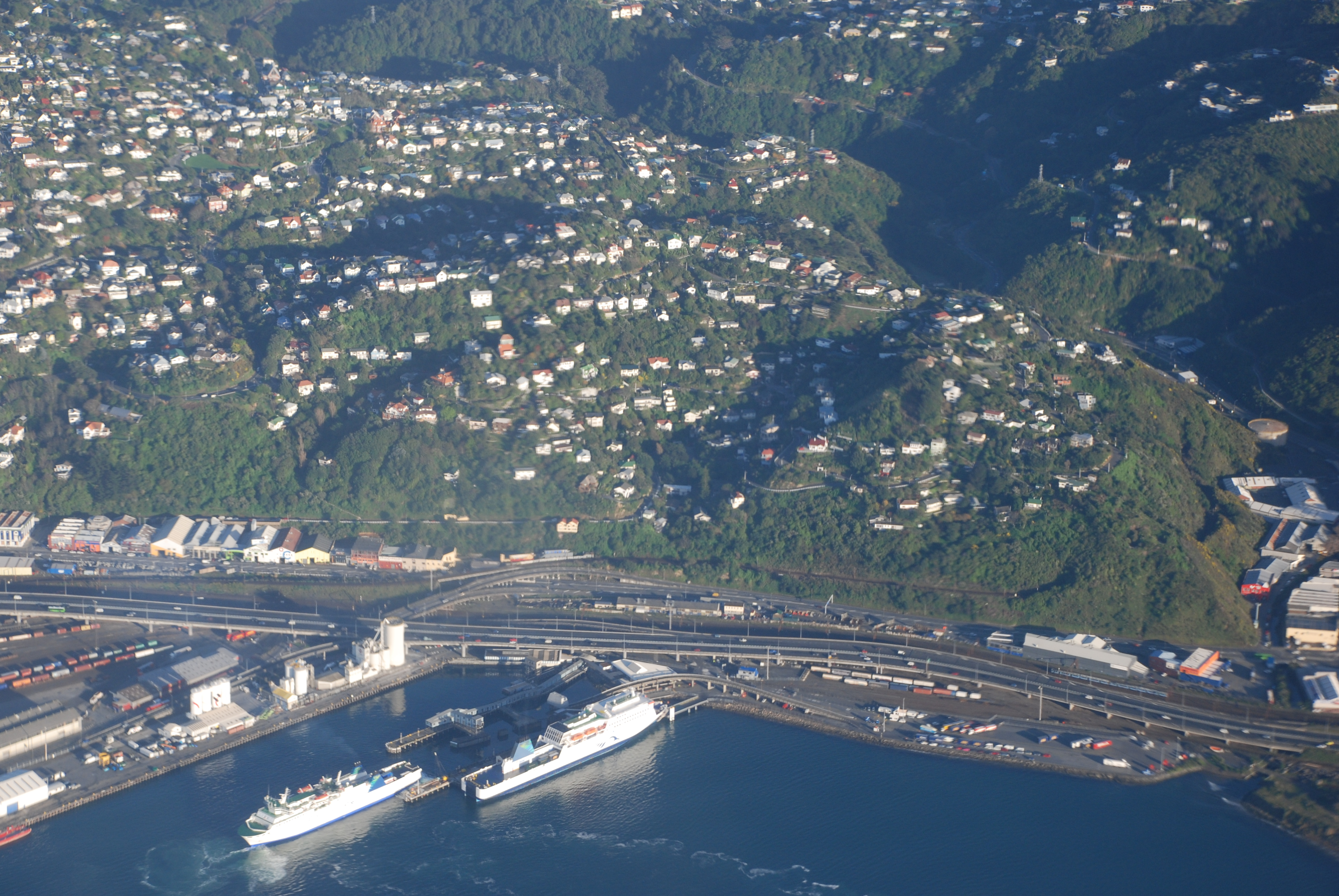
Highland Park above the harbour, old Wadestown behind Moorhouse St.

Wadestown had a population of 3,696 in the 2023 New Zealand census, a decrease of 57 people (−1.5%) since the 2018 census, and an increase of 180 people (5.1%) since the 2013 census. There were 1,773 males, 1,872 females, and 48 people of other genders in 1,383 dwellings. 9.1% of people identified as LGBTIQ+. The median age was 38.0 years (compared with 38.1 years nationally). There were 522 people (14.1%) aged under 15 years, 963 (26.1%) aged 15 to 29, 1,749 (47.3%) aged 30 to 64, and 462 (12.5%) aged 65 or older.

People could identify as more than one ethnicity. The results were 89.8% European (Pākehā); 7.4% Māori; 1.4% Pasifika; 9.3% Asian; 1.9% Middle Eastern, Latin American and African New Zealanders (MELAA); and 2.1% other, which includes people giving their ethnicity as "New Zealander". English was spoken by 98.5%, Māori by 2.4%, Samoan by 0.3%, and other languages by 17.7%. No language could be spoken by 1.0% (e.g. too young to talk). New Zealand Sign Language was known by 0.5%. The percentage of people born overseas was 26.5, compared with 28.8% nationally.

Religious affiliations were 23.9% Christian, 0.6% Hindu, 0.4% Islam, 0.2% Māori religious beliefs, 0.9% Buddhist, 0.5% New Age, 0.4% Jewish, and 1.8% other religions. People who answered that they had no religion were 66.7%, and 4.6% of people did not answer the census question.

Of those at least 15 years old, 2,046 (64.5%) people had a bachelor's or higher degree, 939 (29.6%) had a post-high school certificate or diploma, and 195 (6.1%) people exclusively held high school qualifications. The median income was $71,600, compared with $41,500 nationally. 1,131 people (35.6%) earned over $100,000 compared to 12.1% nationally. The employment status of those at least 15 was 1,983 (62.5%) full-time, 468 (14.7%) part-time, and 63 (2.0%) unemployed.

== Geographic boundaries ==
From a boundary between Wadestown and Thorndon at the northern end of Grant Road, the Wadestown boundary follows a line along Frandi Street and Sar Street, above the Hutt Road to a point below the easternmost extent of Barnard Street. From there, the boundary turns northwest and continues into the Ngaio Gorge to an intersection with Kaiwharawhara Road. It then follows the course of the Kaiwharawhara stream up the Ngaio Gorge to the intersection of Churchill Drive and Blackbridge Road. The boundary then turns south and follows a line along Wilton Road to the intersection with Norwich Street. From there, it takes a line to the top of Te Ahumairangi Hill above Salisbury Garden Court. The southern boundary descends along the top section of Weld Street and then runs east above Wade Street, descending southwest of Orchard Street into Thorndon.

== Electorate boundaries ==
Prior to 2014, Wadestown was in the Wellington Central electorate.

In 2014, the Electoral Commission announced various changes to electorate boundaries. One of these changes was to extend the boundaries of the existing Ōhariu electorate to now include Wadestown.

== Education ==
=== School enrolment zones ===
The suburb of Wadestown is within the enrolment zones of Wellington High School, Wellington College, Wellington Girls' College, Onslow College and Wadestown School. The eastern parts of the suburb, including Highland Park, are within the enrolment zone of Thorndon School.

=== Primary school ===
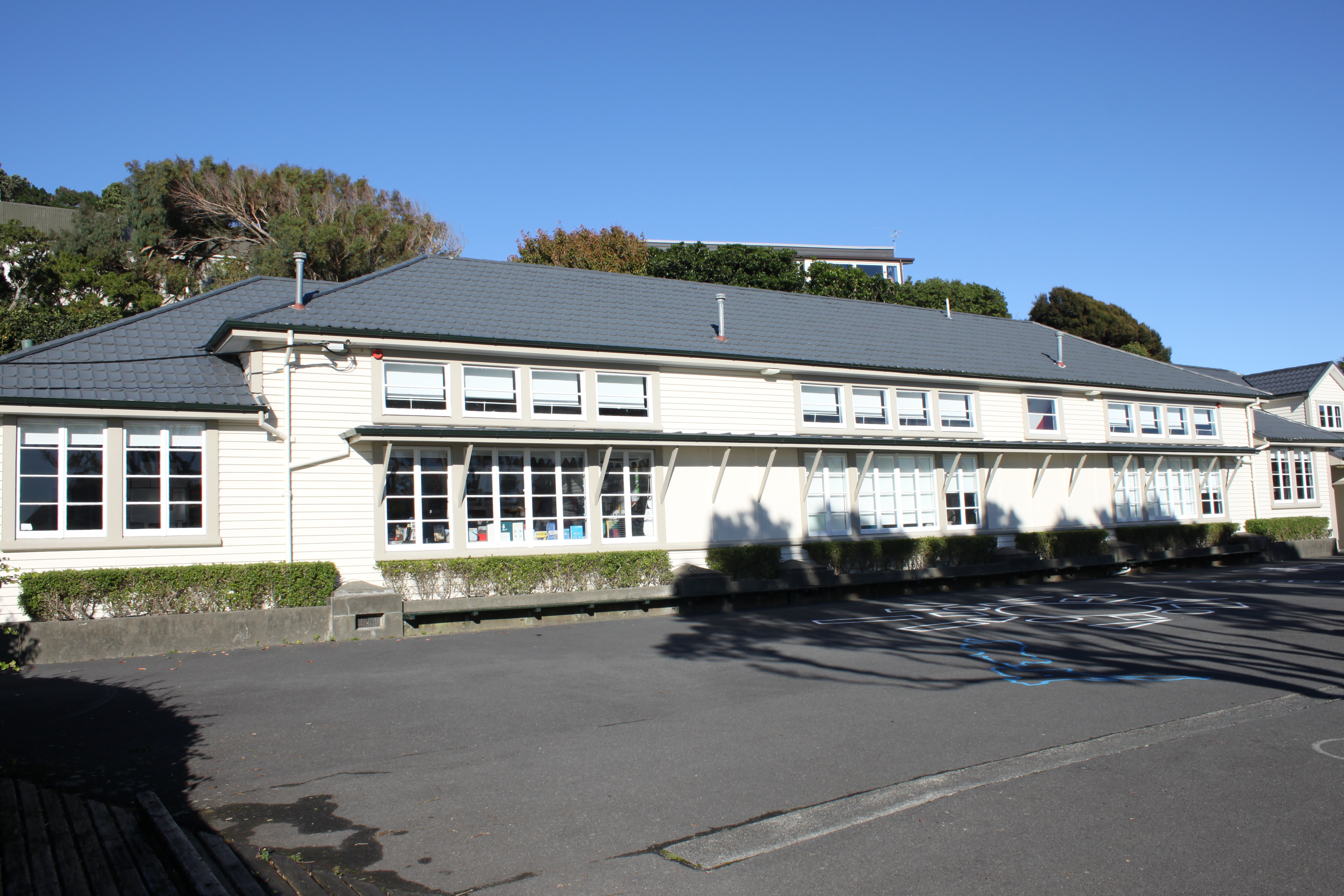
Wadestown School - Weld Street

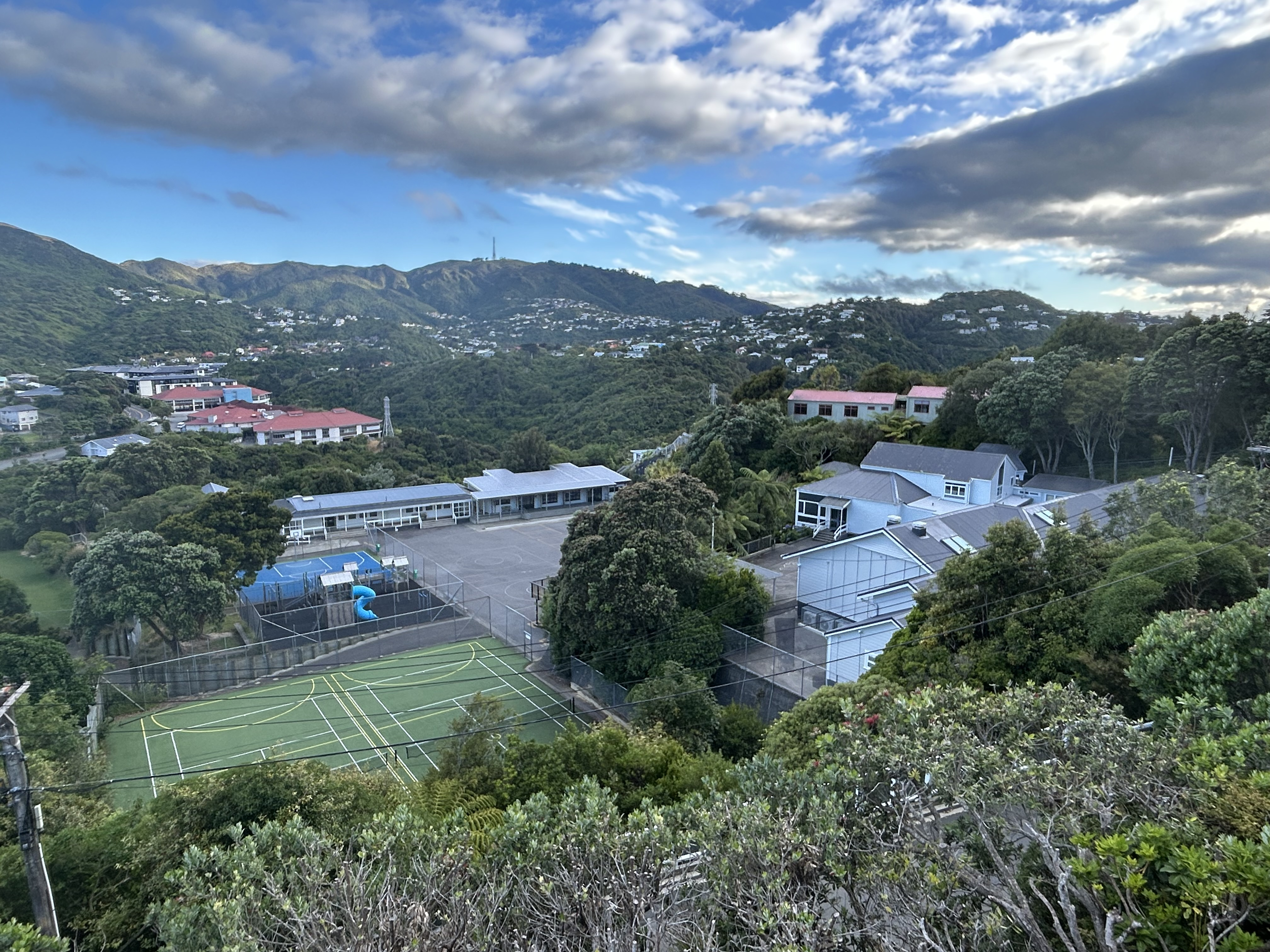
Wadestown School - Rose Street

Wadestown School is a co-educational state school for Year 1 to 8 children. It has a roll of 249 as of July 2026. The school is located on two sites about 1 km apart.

The Weld Street campus (previously known as the Side School) is designed for new entrants, and consists of parallel junior classes (Years 1–2). The school grounds include a playing field, a playground, gardens and a small pool. The Deputy Principal has an office at both Rose Street and Weld Street, sharing time between the two locations.

The Rose Street campus (previously known as the Main School) is located on multiple levels of a hilly site between Rose Street and Purakau Avenue, above Wadestown Road. It provides for children from Years 2–8. Access to the Rose Street campus is by footpath from Mairangi Road at the top of Rose Street. The school has only limited vehicular access. Pedestrian access is available via Purakau Avenue. At the Rose Street campus there are four blocks of classrooms at different levels. Although the Rose Street site is hilly, the grounds include a large flat playground, a playing field, landscaped gardens and tennis courts.

The majority of Wadestown pupils come from the local suburb but a number also come from Wilton, Chartwell, Thorndon, Khandallah and Crofton Downs. The school has an enrolment zone scheme in place.

The Education Act 1877 established a secular, compulsory and free national system of primary education, and 12 Education Boards to oversee state schools. Wadestown School was first opened on the Weld Street site on 1 June 1881, and was one of the earliest state schools to be established in Wellington. It was initially built as a single classroom schoolhouse, but by 1896 it had been extended twice. The original Side School building was demolished after the Second World War and rebuilt in the current design. The replacement building was officially opened on 15 June 1946. The Rose Street campus began as two classrooms on the present Rose Street site, and was opened in February 1917. There have been multiple renovations and building developments on the site since the first opening.

A detailed history of the school was published in 2006 in preparation for the 125th Anniversary in November 2006.

=== Pre-school education ===
Pre-school education in Wadestown is provided by Wadestown Kindergarten, a part of Wellington's Free Kindergarten Association. The Wadestown Playgroup provides play activities for children under 5 at the Wadestown Playground and Plunket rooms.

== Community facilities ==
=== Library ===
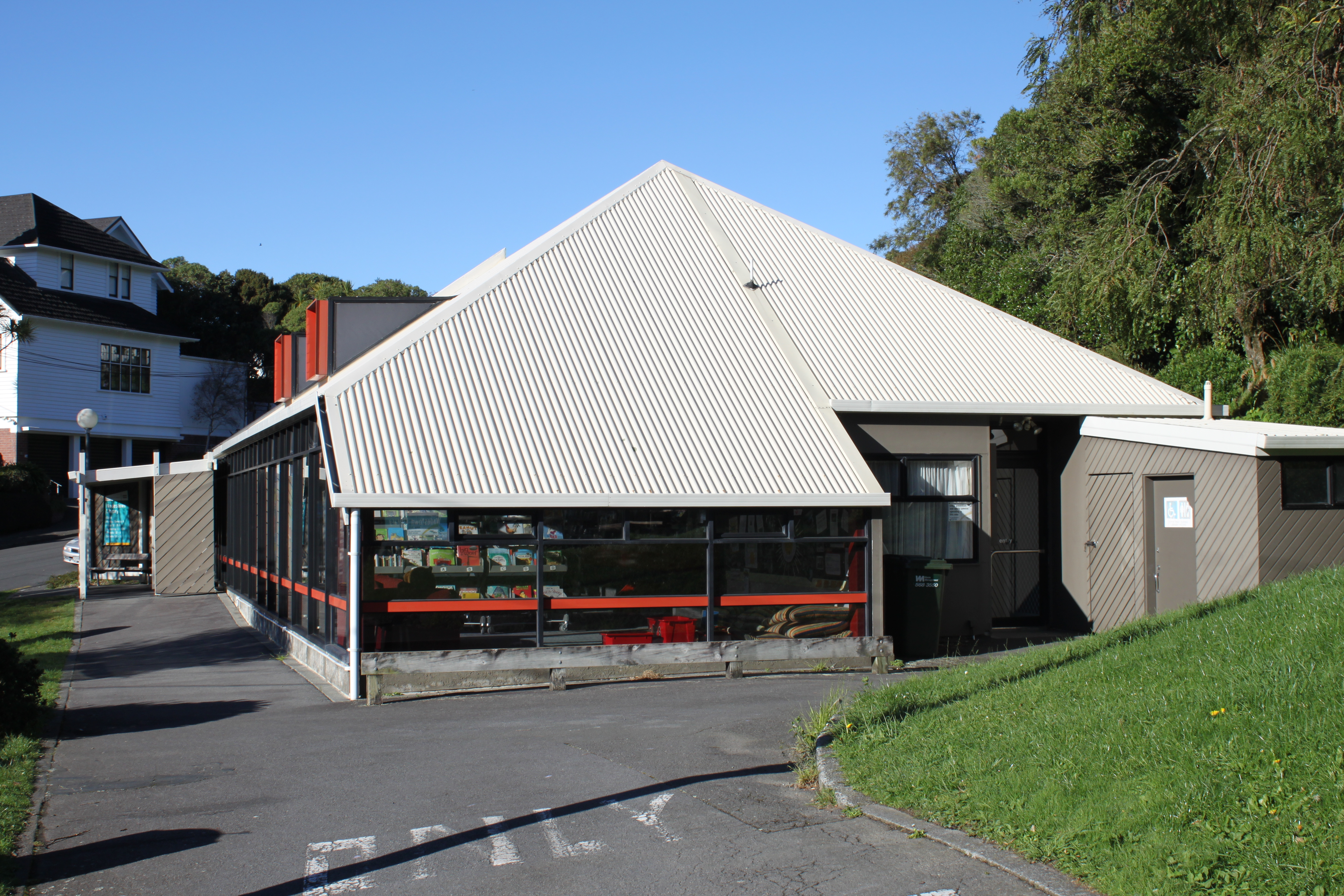
Wadestown Library built 1980 on Philip Myers Park

Wellington City Libraries operates a branch library at the corner of Lennel and Moorhouse Roads. The site is at the bottom of a landfilled tip that is now a green space known as Philip Myers Park.

=== Tennis club ===
The Wadestown Tennis Club which operates at Wadestown School was founded in 1924.

=== Community Centre ===
The Wadestown Community Centre was located in Pitt Street. The Centre accommodated a number of community groups including the Wadestown Toy Library. A community creche with 30 years of service to the Wadestown community operated in the building until it was closed in June 2019. The Centre itself was closed by the Wellington City Council in 2024.

== Transportation ==
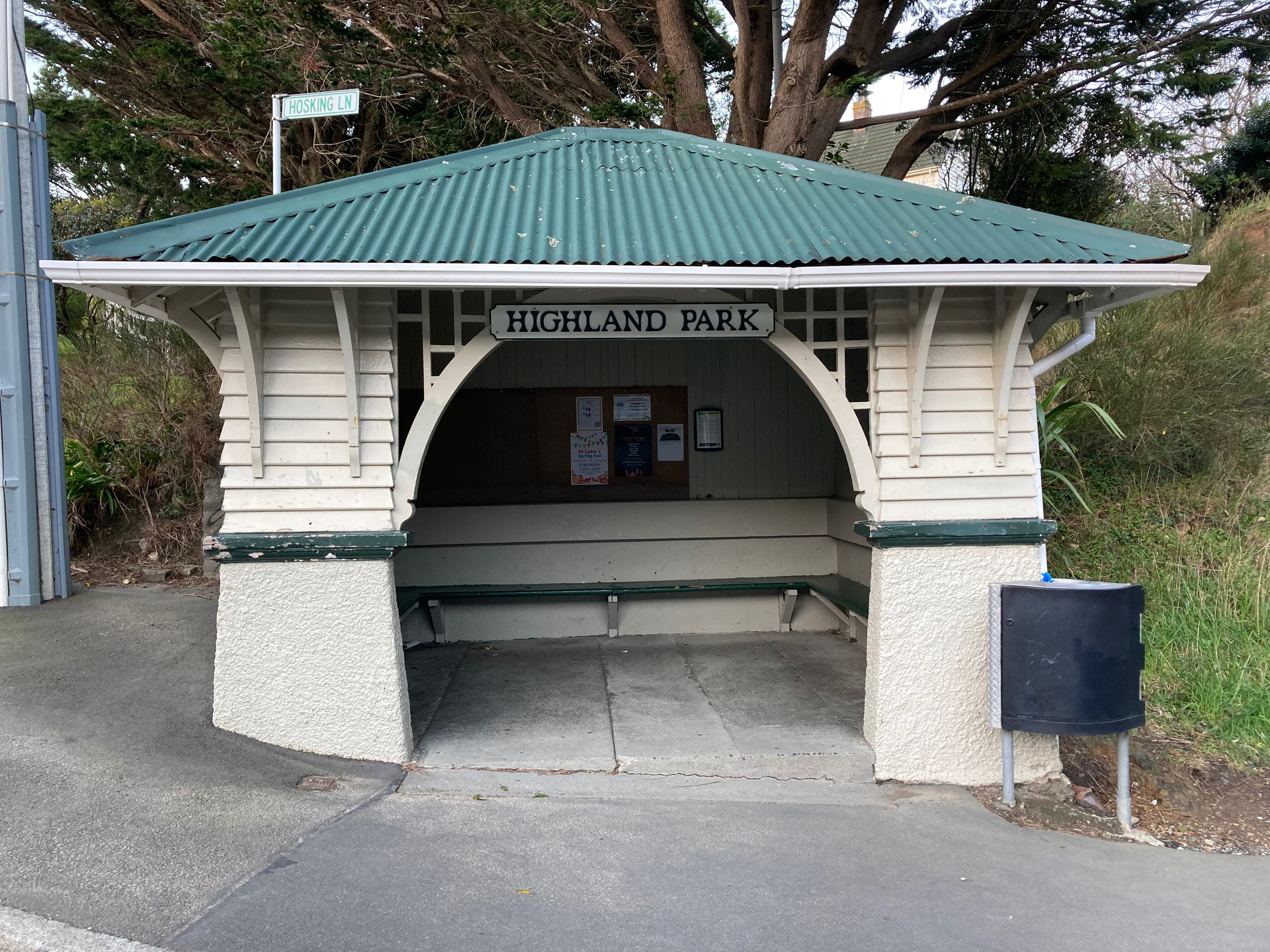
Highland Park bus shelter, August 2021

Wadestown is served by the No 14 Wilton bus route.

Wellington had a tramway system between 1878 and 1964. Wadestown was part of the network from 1911. The narrow and steep cutting that forms part of Lennel Road between Barnard Street and Sefton street was specifically created for the tramway. In c. 1918 a tram shelter was built on the corner of Sefton Street and Hosking Lane/Lennel Road. It continues to be used as a bus shelter and is preserved for its architectural and historic value. The Wadestown tram line was closed in 1949 and replaced by a bus service.

=== Rail ===
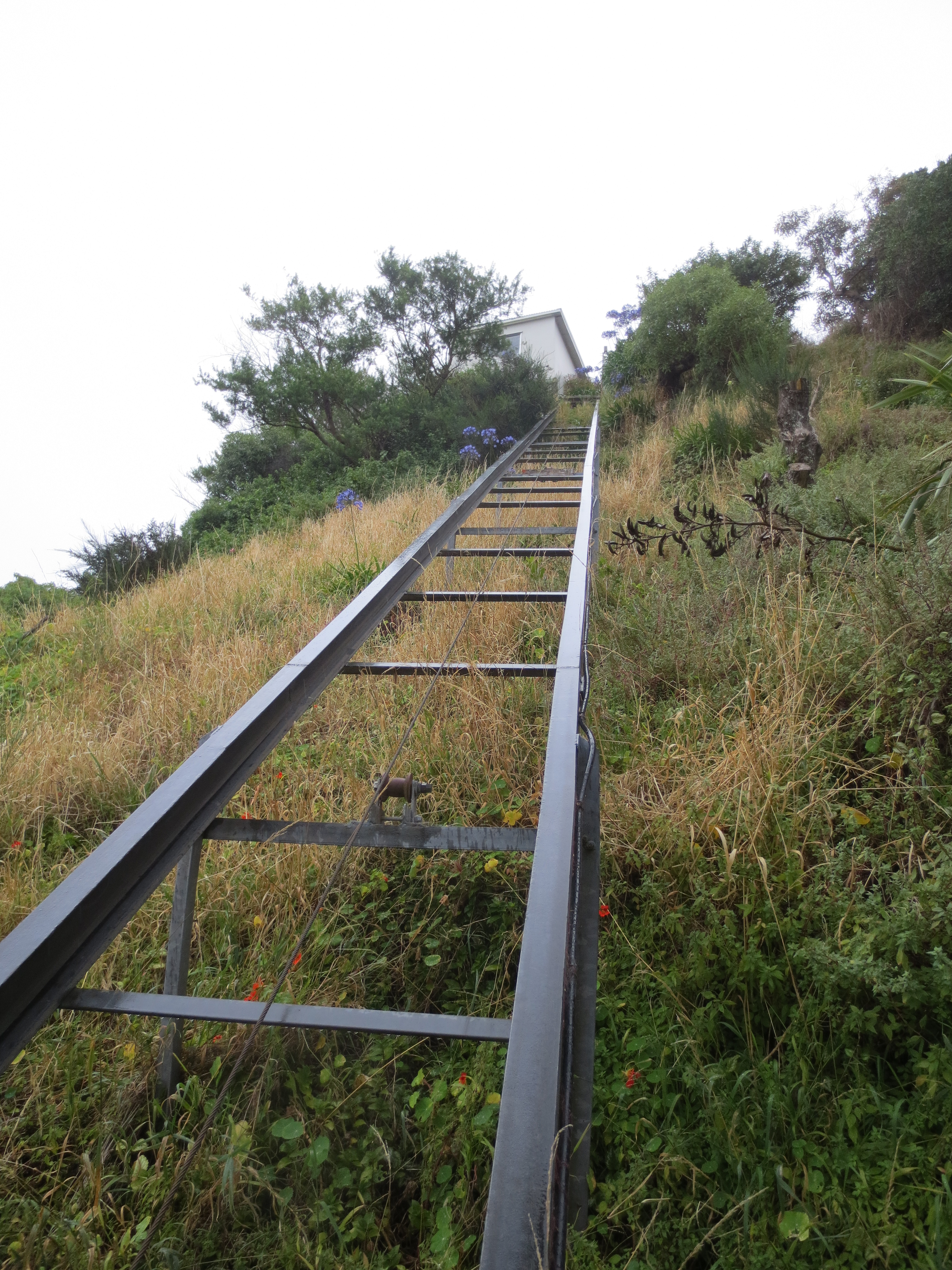
A private funicular

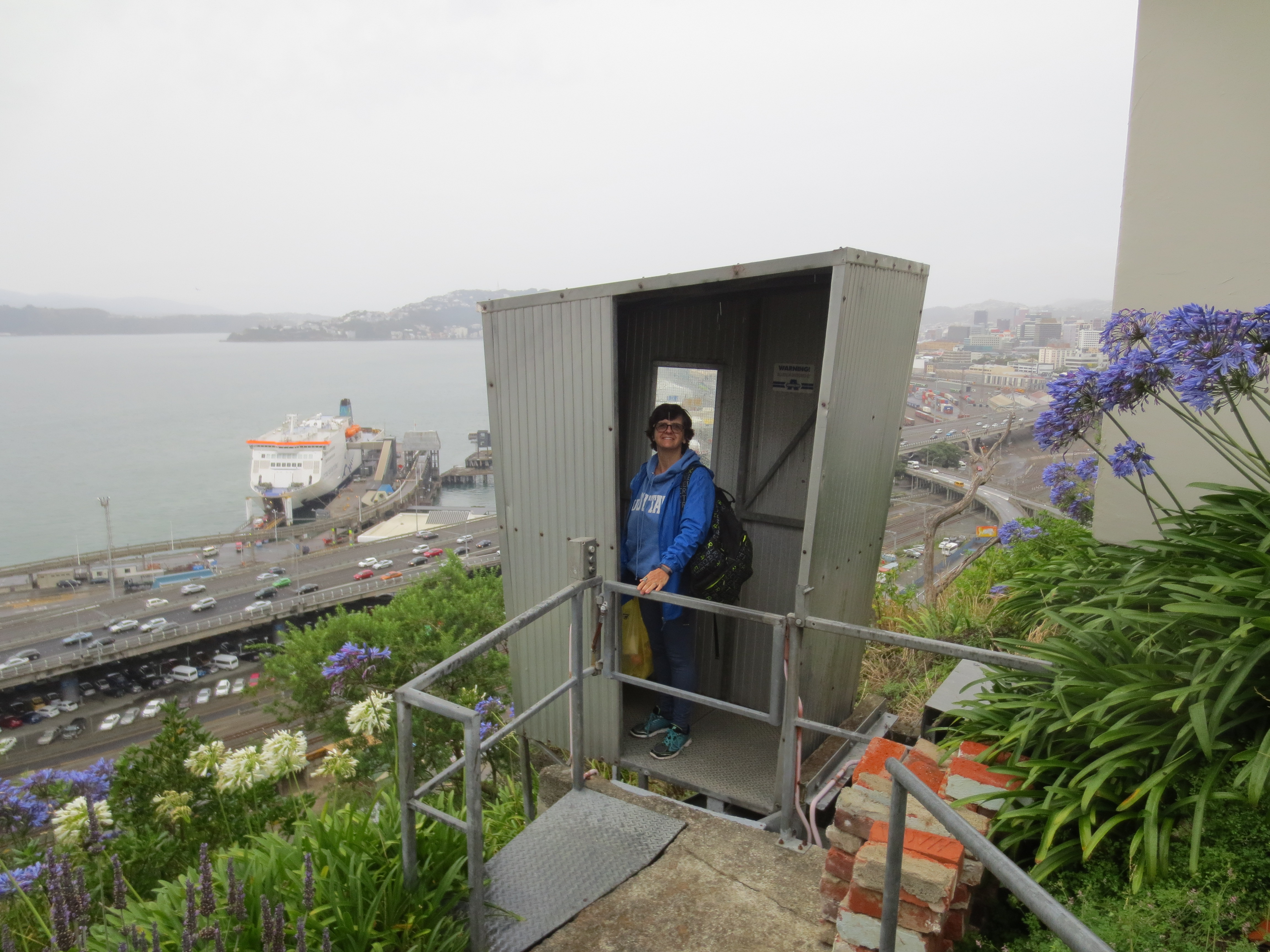
The funicular's terminus

The Johnsonville line runs along the lower slopes of Wadestown, above the Ngaio Gorge. It was originally built by the Wellington and Manawatu Railway Company in the mid-1880s, as part of the proposed line from Wellington to Palmerston North. This line was the route of the North Island Main Trunk railway out of Wellington until 1938, when it became the Johnsonville branch line after completion of the Tawa Flat Deviation. There are no train stations in Wadestown itself, although there is a Wadestown crossing loop on the line. The nearest station is Crofton Downs. The steep hillsides in Wadestown occasionally cause difficulties for the commuter train service deep in the valley.

== Churches ==
Between 1910 and 2007, Wadestown had three main churches. St Lukes Wadestown (Anglican) and Wadestown Presbyterian were located on Wadestown Road, and both traced their history back to original establishment in Wadestown in 1881. A Catholic church, St Brigid's was built in 1910 and operated until mid-2007. It was then deconsecrated and converted to residential accommodation.

In August 2012, the Wadestown Presbyterian Church building and church hall were identified as earthquake prone, and were closed pending earthquake strengthening. Services were transferred to alternative locations. The hall was strengthened in 2013, and the main church building in 2016. In 2023, the church closed permanently, and the last service was held on 26 March 2023. The site was sold to a property developer in January 2025.

== Northern Walkway ==
The route of Wellington's Northern Walkway passes through Wadestown, from the Kaiwharawhara stream in Trelissick Park up Hanover Street and Weld Street, and onto Te Ahumairangi Hill. This part of the Northern Walkway is also part of the national walkway, Te Araroa.

== Historic places ==
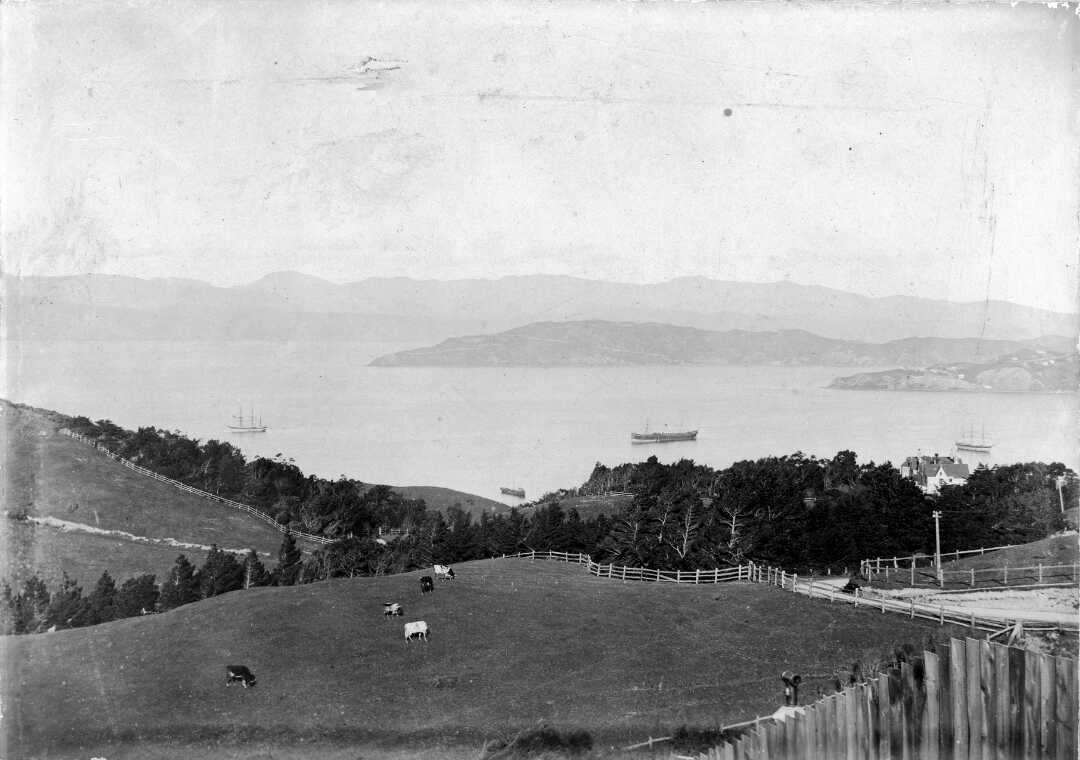
The Grange's cows graze on the future rubbish tip much later Philip Myers Park. Rhodes' house is on the right of the picture where Orchard Street is now

=== Highland Park ===
Highland Park run belonged to W B Rhodes, "the richest man in New Zealand". It was the site of The Grange, his run's homestead overlooking the harbour. Highland Park had been bought by Rhodes before 1849 and was part of the original James Watt and John Wade holding. Controlled subdivision in the 20th century after his widow died in 1914 resulted in much more generous houses of much better quality.

Rhodes family members are commemorated in Highland Park's street names: Barnard Street (W Barnard Rhodes known as Barnard), Anne Street (first recorded as Ann, unknown, perhaps for his daughter Mary Ann), Sar Street (Sarah Ann Rhodes née Moorhouse (second wife)), Sefton Street and Moorhouse Street for her brother

Older than any of them Watt Street is named for original owner James Watt and a match for Wade Street running at right angles from its southern end, the surveyors unaware of the lie of the land. The Lennel Road cutting with Watt Street bridge was made for the tramway at the beginning of the 20th century and after much illicit use by animals, pedestrians and some vehicles expanded to roadway when the tram service finished in 1949.

The plan to subdivide beyond the grounds of Mrs Rhodes' house was announced in 1901 but an act of parliament to permit the sale and disputes with the Onslow Borough Council delayed even the first sales until 1912.

=== Fort Buckley ===
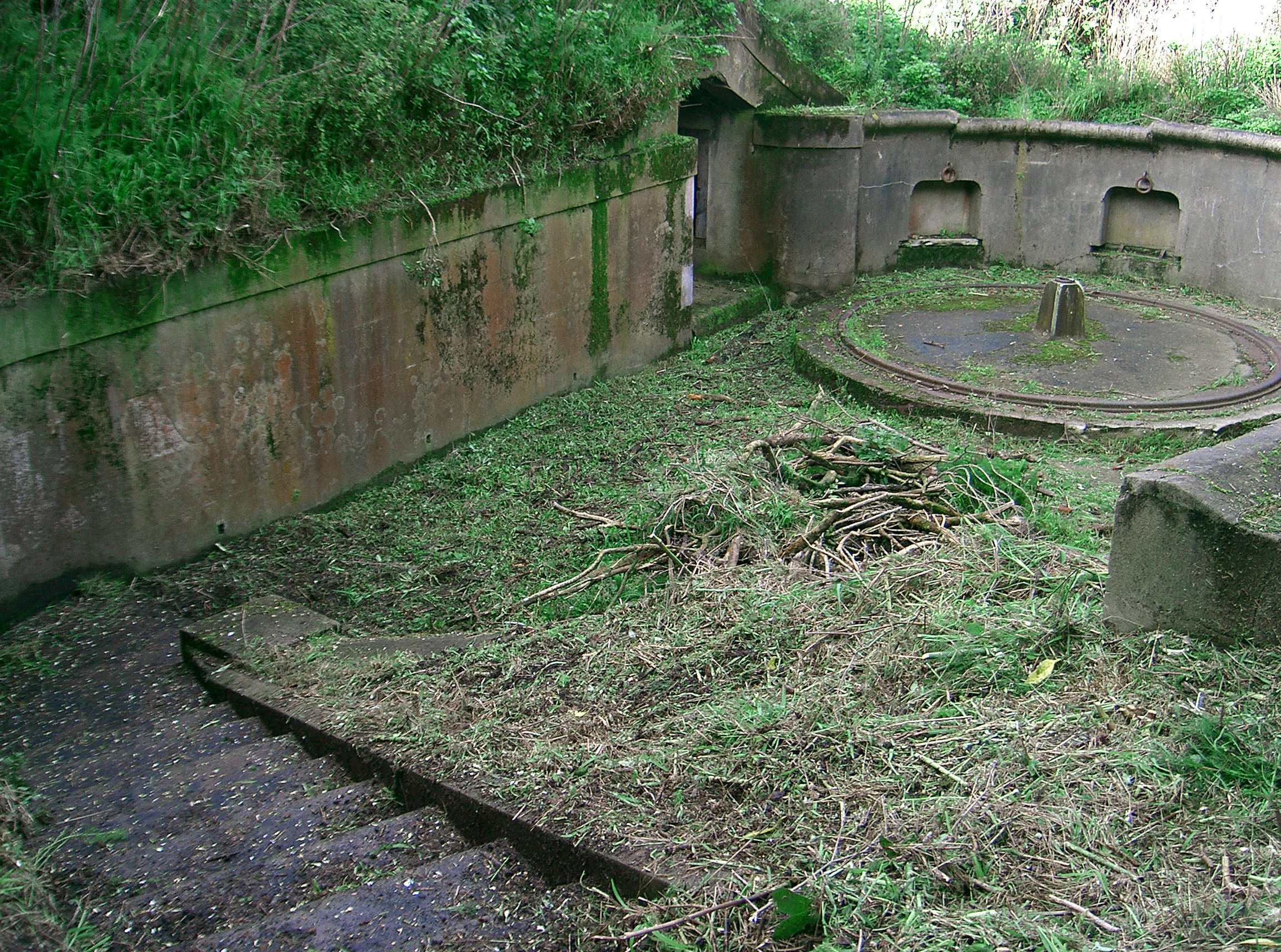
The eastern gun pit at Fort Buckley

The fort is located on a steep hill below Barnard Street, overlooking Wellington harbour. It was built in 1885 in response to concerns that Russia was planning to expand its empire in the South Pacific, and was the first fort capable of defending Wellington's port from a naval attack. It is of national historical importance because the battery is one of the least altered examples of the first defences constructed in the late nineteenth-century in preparation for an expected Russian naval invasion. Fort Buckley is part of a wider network of coastal defences erected around that time, and its construction reflects New Zealand's increasing independence from Britain on military matters during that period.

Heritage New Zealand gave the fort a Category 1 historic place listing in 2004. It is now a recreation reserve managed by the Highland Park Progressive Association (HPPA) in partnership with the Wellington City Council (WCC).

=== Salisbury Garden Court ===
Salisbury Garden Court is a group of 16 houses clustered in matching pairs around a tennis court between 131 and 133 Cecil Road near the top of Te Ahumairangi Hill in Wadestown. Special aspects of the area are the central court, the bush reserve around the group of houses, and the very steep, pedestrian-only access. Built in 1929–30, the houses show the influence of ‘Garden City’ design ideas. Wellington City Council has designated Salisbury Garden Court a Heritage Area.

During the Great Depression and War years, the earliest tenants made full use of the tennis court as a central activity area. In the 1950s, the Court briefly became a miniature ‘Polish village’, as at one point 13 of the 16 houses were occupied by Poles, many of whom had arrived in New Zealand in 1944 as child refugees. By the 1970s, a ‘hippy commune’ was flourishing at the Court. A documentary film ‘A Place to Stay’, was made by Marie Russell in 2009 about the unique design and unusual social history of Salisbury Garden Court. The film explores the interaction of urban design and community.

Built on the one title as an investment by neighbour and builder Herbert Stanley Pillar at what proved to be the very beginning of the Great Depression it turned out to be difficult for Pillar to attract tenants even when furniture was provided. Each separate bungalow contained "a large sitting room, 2 bedrooms, kitchenette, bathroom etc, electric light, gas cooker, caliphont, blinds provided" . . . "similar to the bungalow courts so popular in America. Separate homes with all the convenience of flats." The pressures of the inner-city housing refurbishment boom of the 1970s eventually brought legitimate subdivision of their one site and the ability to deal in and finance individual buildings.

=== No 4 Goldies Brae ===
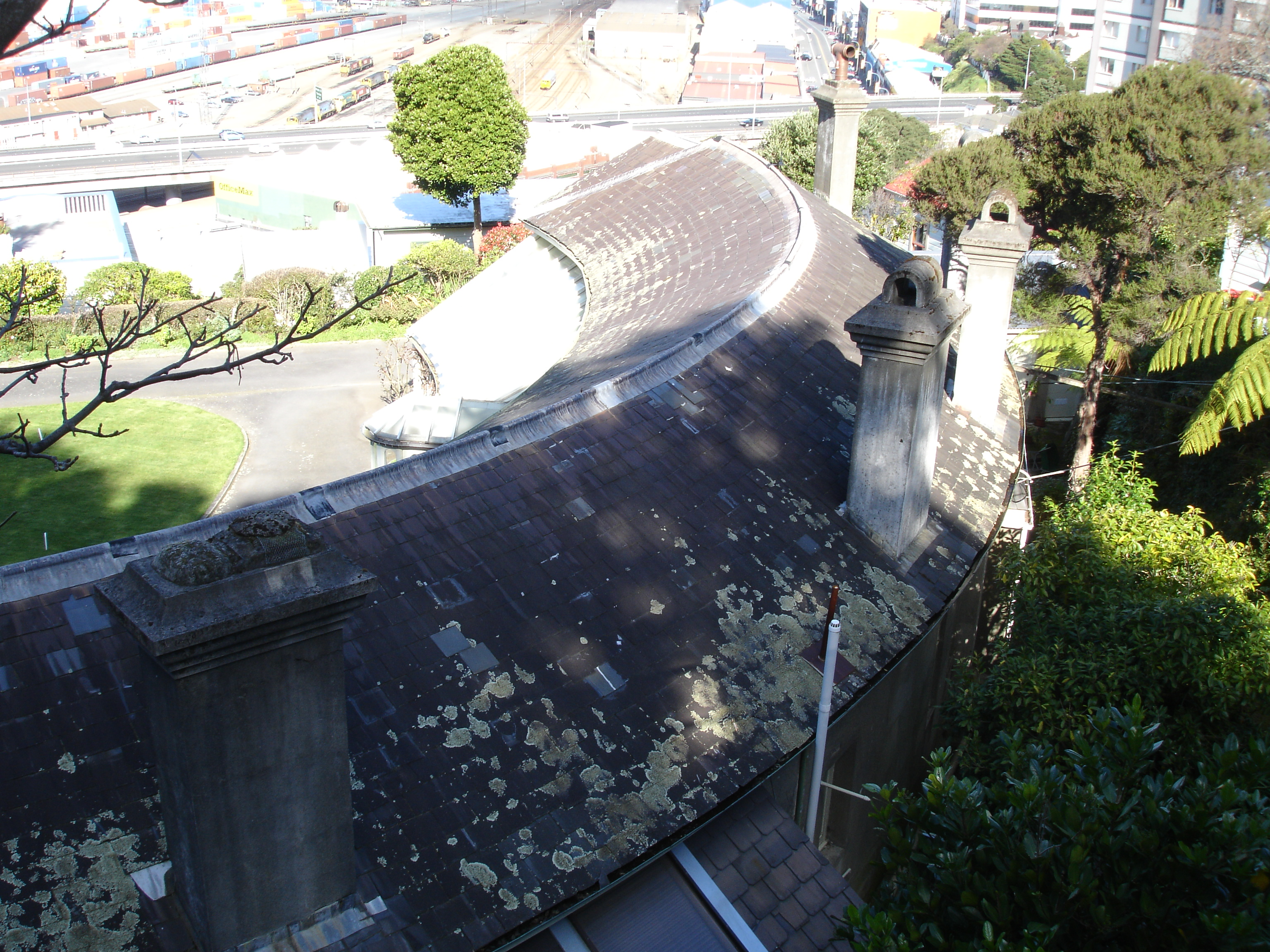
4 Goldies Brae. Until 1907 in Onslow Borough

Another historic place in Wadestown (although now strictly located just inside the Thorndon boundary), is the house at 4 Goldies Brae built for original settler Dr Alexander Johnston and designed by him. It is popularly known as the banana house because of its crescent-shaped layout. The house was constructed in 1876. Reports on the sale of the property in 2020 claimed that the unique design is based on Gatcombe Park, a British stately home that is the country residence of Princess Anne.

It is unusual because of the continuous glazed gallery (or conservatory) that provides enclosed access to each of the ten rooms. This gallery provides solar heat to the rest of the house. The house has a Category 1 listing from the Heritage New Zealand. Silston Cory-Wright lived in this house from 1928 until his death in 1976.

Goldie's Brae estate with 5 acres of grounds included the area now crossed by Grosvenor Terrace — and some of Orchard Street — all beyond Queen's Park at the north end of Grant Road. Its land north of the street of the same name was subdivided at the same time as adjoining Highland Park and its subdivision suffered the same decade of Onslow Borough Council obstructions.

=== Onslow Borough ===
Until April 1907 Wadeston was administered (as its most populous part) within the Borough of Onslow. The boundary placed Goldies Brae in Onslow which extended right through to modern Ngaio and Khandallah. Modern Northland was administered separately. The difficulties of building for early-established Wadestown houses adequate drainage within Onslow's boundaries, the subdivision of the Highland Park estate and the appeal to the residents of this very steep area of joining Wellington's tramway system led to amalgamation in April 1907.

== Notable people ==
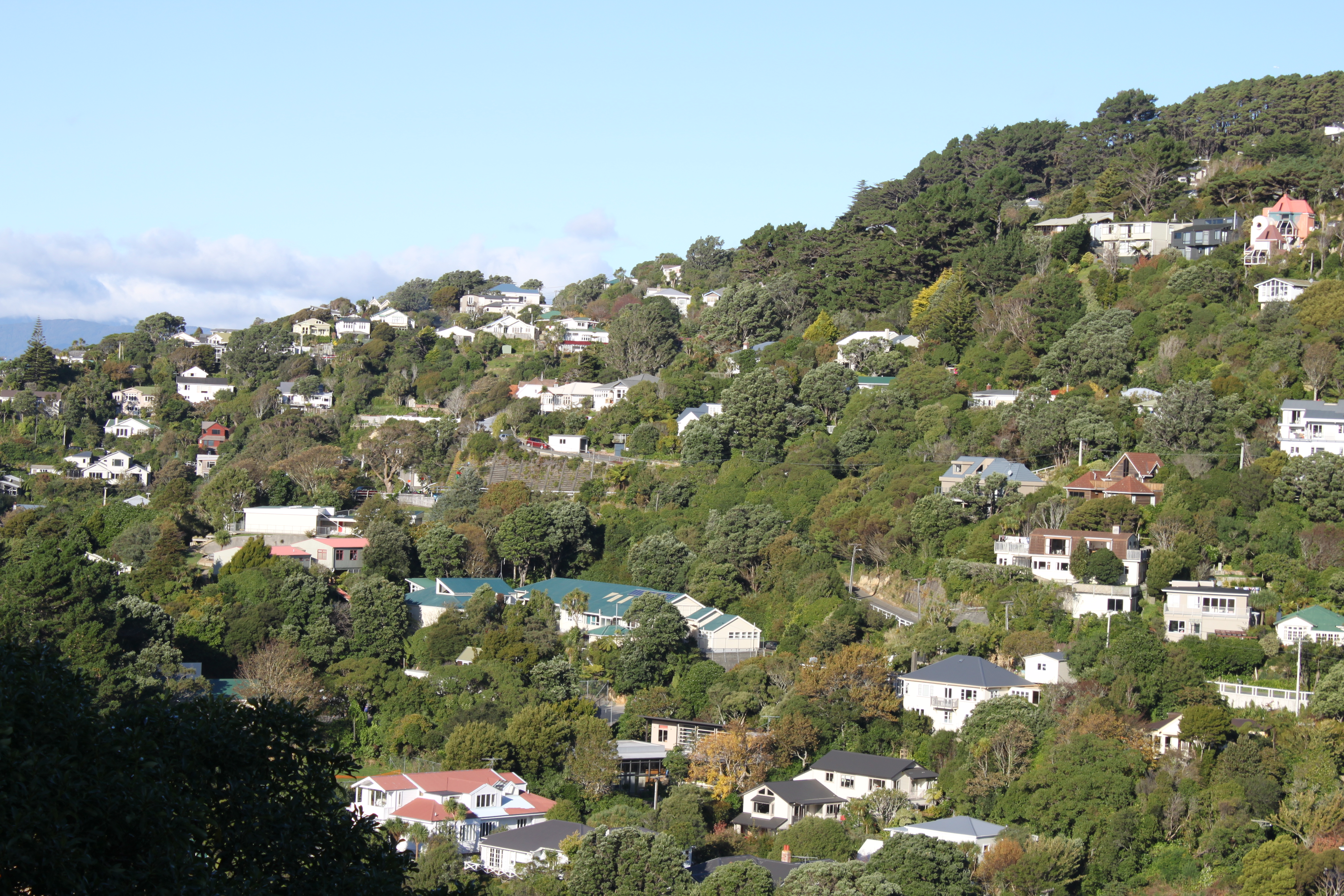
Wadestown – looking from Crofton Downs

Notable people who have grown up, lived or worked in Wadestown include:

- William Barnard Rhodes (1807?–1878) – a New Zealand businessman, pastoralist and politician
- James Hutton Mackenzie (1849–1949) – Presbyterian minister, Moderator of the Presbyterian Assembly 1910, and Clerk of the Assembly for 25 years
- Elsdon Best (1856–1931) – Farm worker, soldier, sawmiller, health inspector, ethnographer, writer
- Joseph Firth (1859–1931) – Headmaster of Wellington College 1892 – 1920
- Heather Roy – Politician
- Lily May Atkinson (1866–1921) – Temperance campaigner, suffragist, feminist
- Silston Cory-Wright (1888–1976) – Engineer, university lecturer, soldier, company director
- Percy Roy Angus (1893–1961) – Railway engineer and administrator
- Clarence Edward Beeby (1902–1998) – Educational psychologist, university lecturer, educationalist, senior public servant, ambassador
- Sylvia Ashton-Warner (1908–1984) – Educationalist, teacher, writer
- Peter Campbell (1937–2011) – Art critic and former apprentice to Denis Glover
- Ray Henwood (1937–2019) – Actor and founding member of Circa Theatre
- Dame Carolyn Henwood – Judge and founding member of Circa Theatre
- Elizabeth Knox (1959–present) – Writer
- Ian Foster (1959 – present) – Director, the Computation Institute of the Argonne National Laboratory and the University of Chicago, who currently resides in Chicago
- Sean Plunket (1964 – present) – New Zealand journalist
- Dai Henwood (1978 – present) – Comedian
