= Wellington Cable Car =

Funicular railway in Wellington, New Zealand

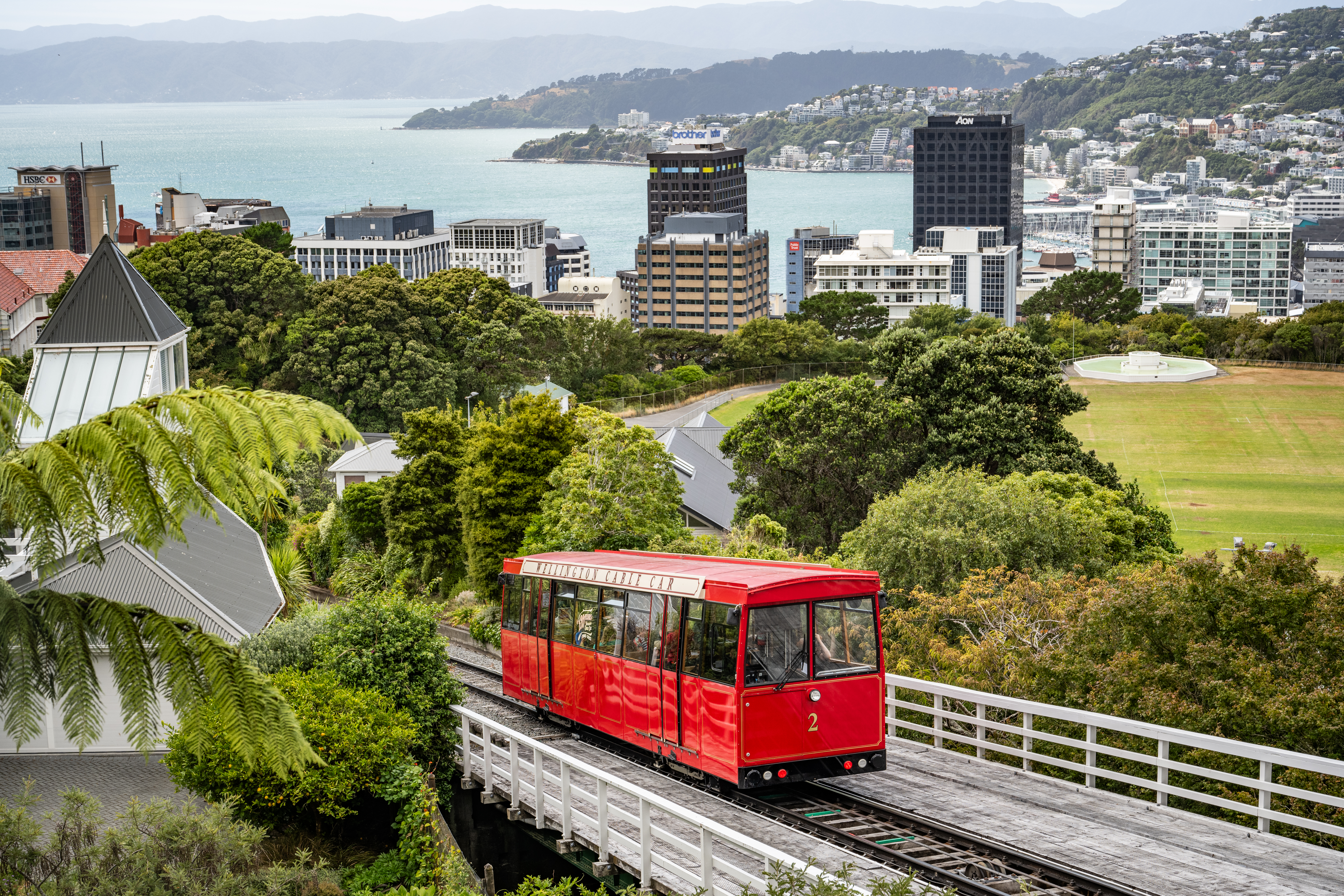
- Top view of Wellington Cable Car

Overview
- Status: In use
- Owner: Wellington Cable Car Ltd, owned by Wellington City Council
- Locale: Wellington, New Zealand

Service
- Type: Funicular
- Operator: Wellington Cable Car Ltd

History
- Opened: 22 February 1902

Technical
- Num of tracks: single track with passing loop in the middle
- Track gauge: 1,000 mm (3 ft 3 3/8 in)
- Maximum incline: 17.86%

The Wellington Cable Car (Māori: Te Waka Taura o Pōneke) is a funicular railway in Wellington, New Zealand. The route is between Lambton Quay, the main shopping street in the central city, and Kelburn, a suburb in the hills overlooking the central city and Wellington Harbour. The cable car route rises 120 m (394 ft) over a length of 609 m (1,998 ft).

The one way trip takes approximately five minutes. The Wellington Cable Car is widely recognised as a top visitor attraction in Wellington.

== Track and stations ==
The line consists of 628 metres (2,060 ft) of mostly straight 1,000 mm (3 ft 3 3/8 in) metre gauge single track with pine sleepers. The only curves are at the passing loop in the middle, at Talavera station. Except for the lowest part the line rises at a constant grade of 1 in 5.06 (17.86% or 10.13 degrees), through three tunnels and over three bridges.

The lower terminus is in Cable Car Lane, off Lambton Quay (41°17′03.3″S 174°46′28.7″E). Intermediate stations are at Clifton Terrace, Talavera (where the cars pass each other) and Salamanca (serving Victoria University). The upper terminus is next to the Wellington Botanic Garden at the city end of Upland Road, Kelburn's main street (41°17′07.25″S 174°46′04.17″E).

The Cable Car passes through three tunnels: under The Terrace, Clifton Terrace, and Weir House. Three bridges take the Cable Car over suburban roads at Everton Terrace, Salamanca Road and Rawhiti Terrace.

== Cars and propulsion ==
The Cable Car has two cars which start from opposite ends of the line and pass in the middle. They are attached to each other by a 30 mm diameter cable, which runs around a pulley at the top of the hill, and is supported by 120 rollers. A 198 kW 400 V AC motor at the top of the hill drives the pulley. The Cable Car is a funicular rather than a true cable car: the cars are permanently attached to the cable and counterbalance each other, stopping and starting as required. Wheels on the south side of car 1 and the north side of car 2 have double flanges, while the opposite wheels on each car have no flanges, directing the cars to the correct side of the mid-way passing loop at Talavera.

The cars are designed to fit the grade, using internal steps to provide horizontal floors.

The normal operating speed is 18 km/h (11.2 mph) (5 m/s or 16.4 ft/s), with a maximum load of around 100 passengers (30 seated, 70 standing). Each car weighs approximately 13.5 t (13.3 long tons; 14.9 short tons) when empty and 21 t (20.7 long tons; 23.1 short tons) when full.

The first female cable car driver in New Zealand was Lorraine Ruka-Isaac who drove the Cable Car from 1979 to 1981.

== Passengers ==
The Cable Car typically provides around a million passenger journeys each year. In the mornings and evenings, it is used by commuters travelling between Kelburn and the city; at other times of the day, it is used by people travelling between the city and the Wellington Botanic Garden, students attending Victoria University and living in nearby student hostels, and by many tourists, especially during summer. On 30 December 2023, the millionth passenger for the year was recorded — the first time that this milestone had been reached since the COVID-19 pandemic.

In 2024, cruise ship passengers accounted for 30% of revenue but that fell to 20% in 2025 as fewer cruise ships visited Wellington.

== Ownership ==
The Cable Car is owned and operated by Wellington Cable Car Ltd, which is in turn owned by Wellington City Council. Wellington Cable Car Ltd is responsible for all operations of the Cable Car, including the maintenance of cars and track, employing drivers, selling tickets and providing customer service. The operation was able to achieve surpluses prior to the COVID-19 pandemic, but suffered a 72% drop in patronage and 77% drop in revenue in 2021-22, and required financial support of $1.3 million from the council. In 2023, the Cable Car returned to making a profit.

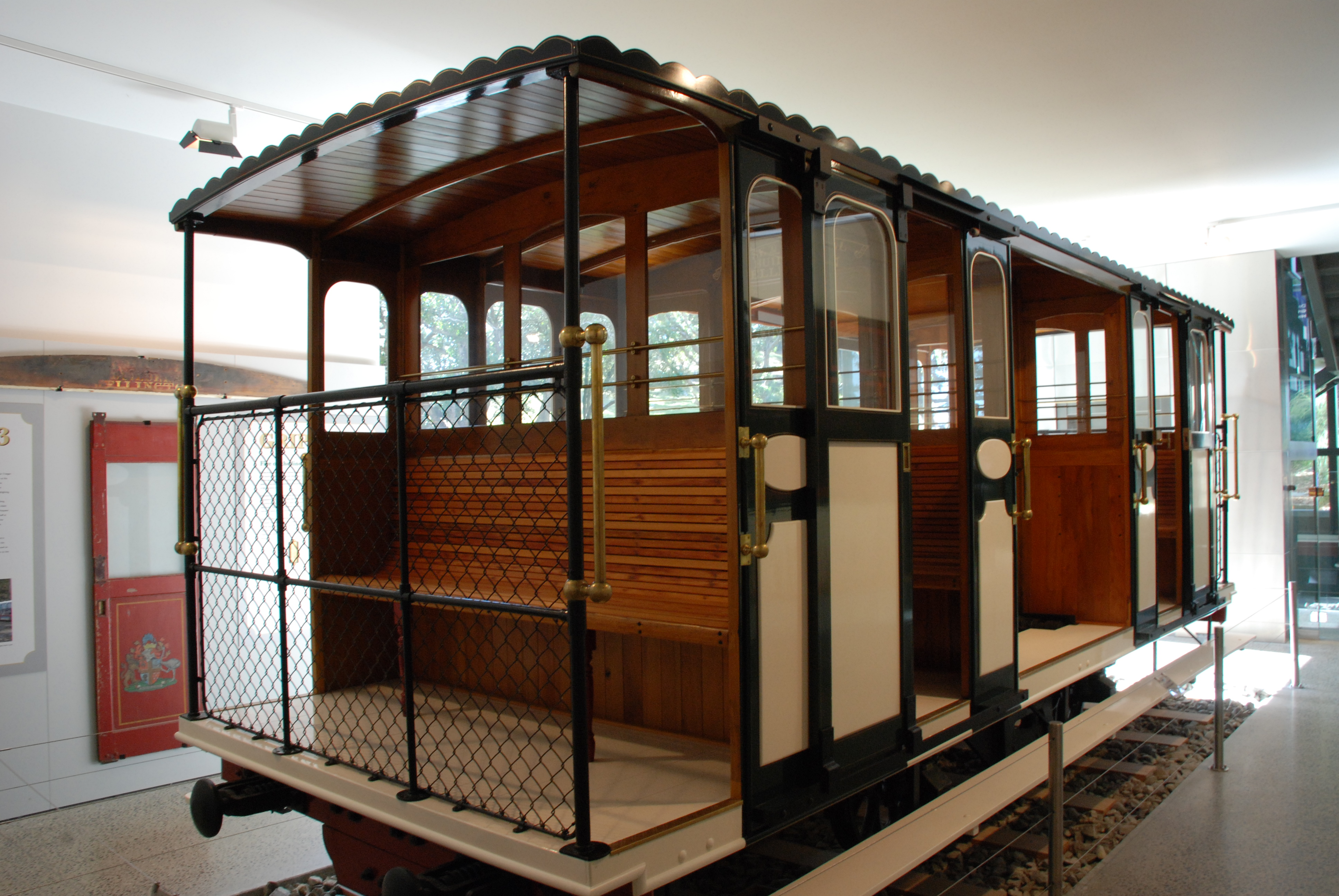
Car 3, restored for display in the museum

== Museum ==
The Cable Car Museum was opened in December 2000. Located in the original winding house, and with a new extension completed in 2006, it houses original grip cars 1 and 3, with the electric winding gear still in working order. Car 1 is in red 1970s livery, including contemporary advertising. Car 3 was restored in 2005 to a green livery dating from 1905, and a bell from the San Francisco Cable Car was added. The winding gear is still in working order and runs a loop of cable, but the cable no longer leaves the building.

The Cable Car Museum is operated by the Wellington Museums Trust. It has a Category II listing with Heritage New Zealand. The Cable Car Museum won the culture and heritage subcategory of the New Zealand Tourism Industry Awards in 2006 and again in 2007.

One of the original cable cars built in 1901 and in use until 1978 is on display at the Wellington Tramway Museum at Queen Elizabeth Park on the Kāpiti coast.

== History ==
Kelburne Cable Car from Salamanca station, 1910

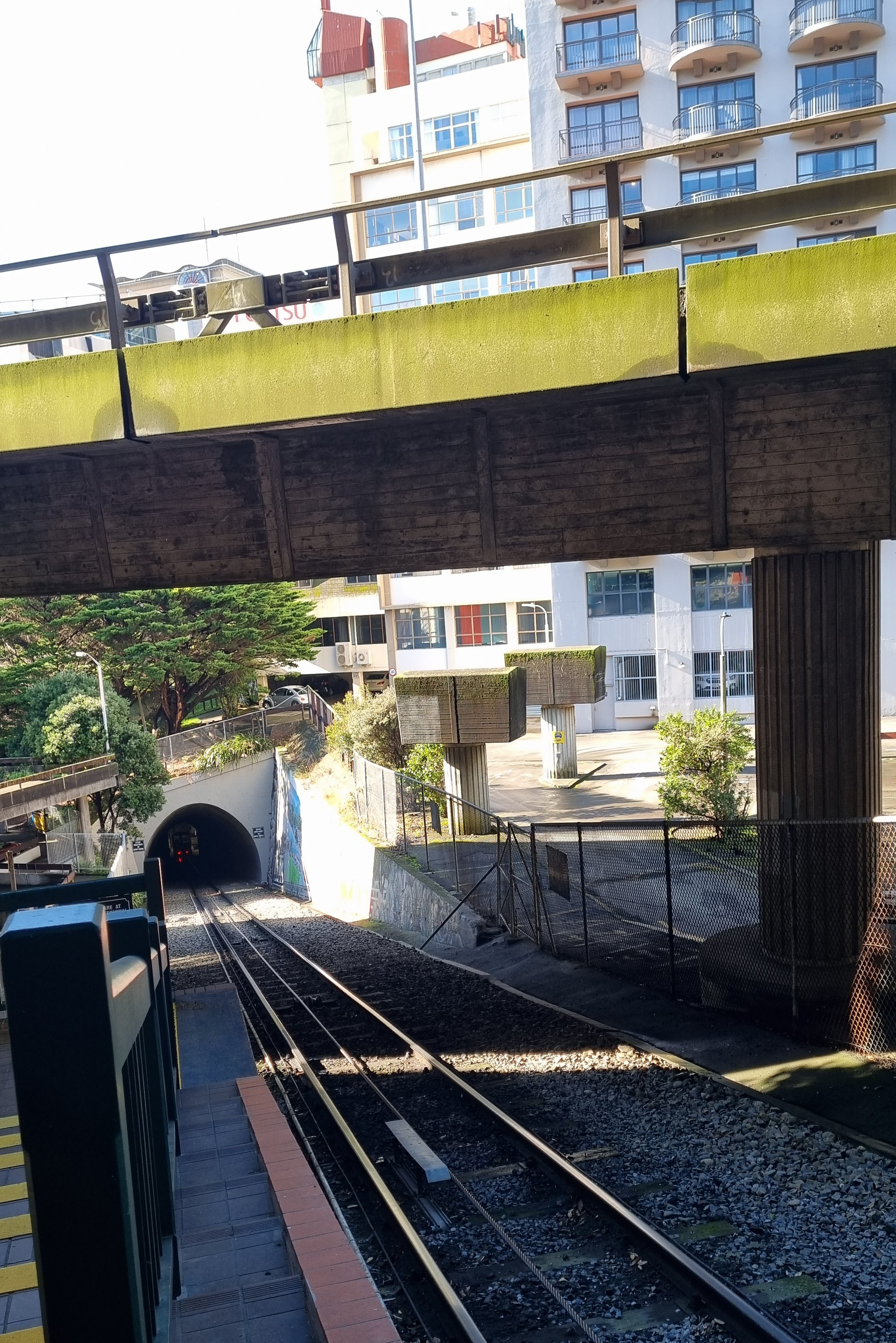
At Clifton Terrace station the motorway passes over the cable car tracks.

=== The original line ===
At the end of the 19th century, Wellington was expanding rapidly and good building land was at a premium due to the city's hilly terrain. When new residential developments were proposed for Kelburn, it was suggested that a cable car or funicular could be built to provide easy access. In 1898, a number of people prominent in the development of the residential subdivisions founded the Kelburne and Karori Tramway Company. The plan was to build a tramway between the city and Kelburn, and link it by carriage to Karori, a settlement on the far side of Kelburn. The company began purchasing land for the construction of the tramway and negotiated with the Karori authorities for a new road (now Upland Road) to link the upper terminus with Karori. In 1898, the city council granted permission for the venture, on the condition that it had the option to purchase the operation at a later date. The location of Victoria University of Wellington was influenced by the company's offer of a donation of £1000 if the university were located in Kelburn, so students would patronise the car when travelling between the city and the university. Several of the company investors like Martin Kennedy were supporters of Prime Minister Richard Seddon, who stalled on releasing land on the alternative Mount Cook jail site for the university, although this site was widely supported in Wellington.

The designer of the system was James Fulton, a Dunedin-born engineer. Fulton was responsible for both selecting the route and deciding the method of operation, a hybrid between a cable car and a funicular. Like a cable car, the line had a continuous loop haulage cable that the cars gripped using a cable car gripper, but it also had a funicular-style balance cable permanently attached to both cars over an undriven pulley at the top of the line. The descending car gripped the haulage cable and was pulled downhill, in turn pulling the ascending car (which remained ungripped) uphill by the balance cable. There was a Fell type centre rail, used for emergency braking only. The line was double track, of 3 ft 6 in (1,067 mm) gauge.

Construction began in 1899, involving three teams working around the clock. The line opened to the public on 22 February 1902. Demand was high, with thousands of people travelling each day. In 1903, a number of old horse-drawn Wellington trams were converted into cable car trailers, increasing capacity. By 1912, the annual number of passengers had reached one million. In 1933, the steam-powered winding gear was replaced by an electric motor, improving control and reducing operating costs.

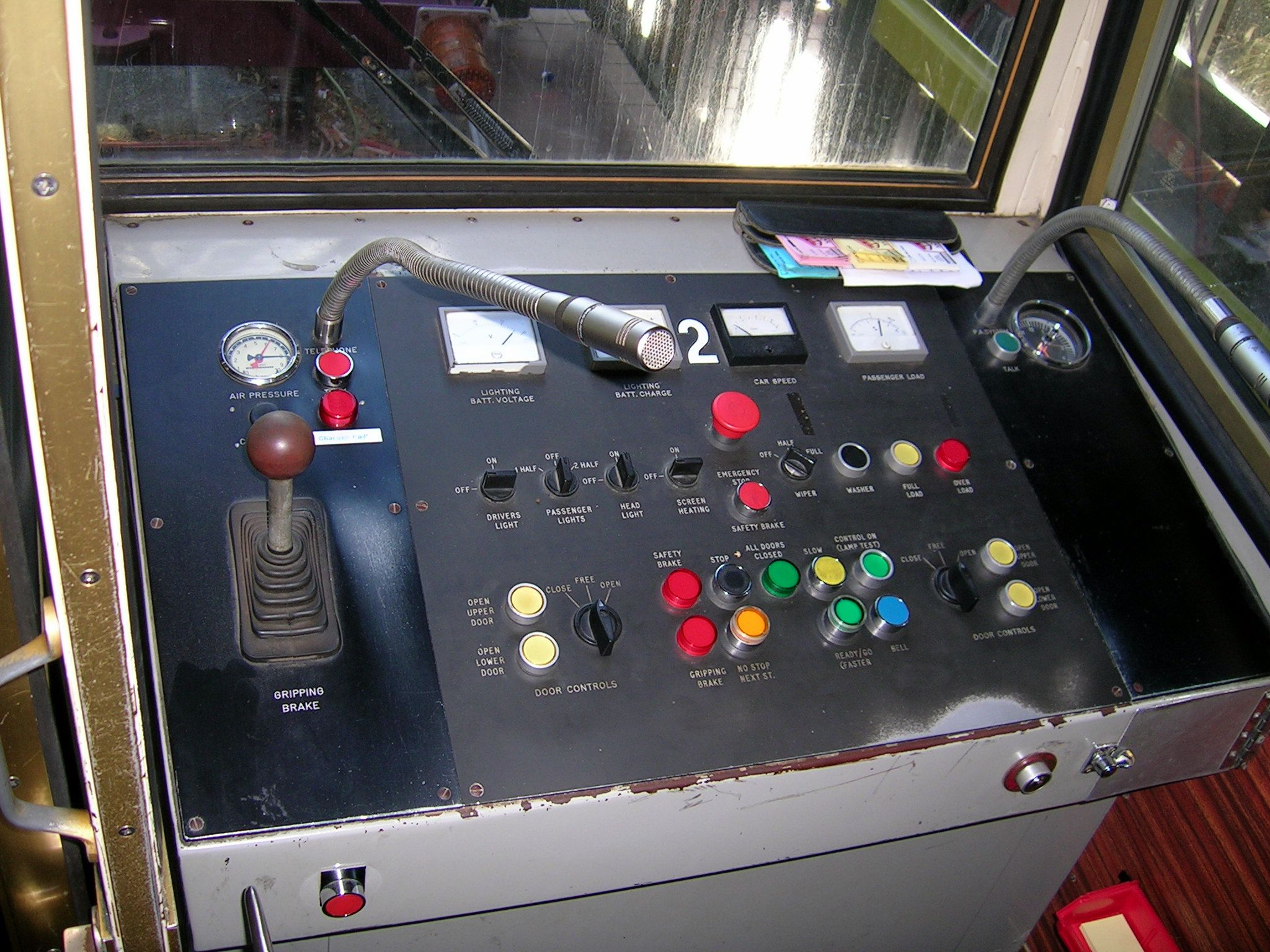
Control panel in one of the cable cars.

In the 1940s, the Cable Car suffered from increased competition: city council buses ran to Karori and other western suburbs, bypassing it. The company believed that it was inappropriate for the city council to compete with a private company, and a legal dispute broke out. The argument ended when the city council agreed to purchase the company, which occurred on 13 February 1947.

In the 1960s and 1970s, the Cable Car was the subject of complaints about safety and comfort. The old wooden cars were increasingly considered antiquated. On 10 May 1973, a worker on the new motorway suffered serious injuries in an accident when he stepped in front of a Cable Car at the Clifton stop, prompting a review. The Ministry of Works concluded that aspects of the Cable Car were unsafe, particularly the use of unbraked trailers, and called for the system to be scrapped. The trailers were withdrawn, considerably reducing capacity.

=== 1978–1979 upgrade ===
Despite public protests led by Mayor of Wellington Michael Fowler, the line closed on 22 September 1978 for re-gauging and installation of new steel cars and equipment by Habegger AG of Switzerland, becoming a full funicular. The contract was managed by Wellington engineering firm Cory-Wright and Salmon. The line re-opened on 22 October 1979.

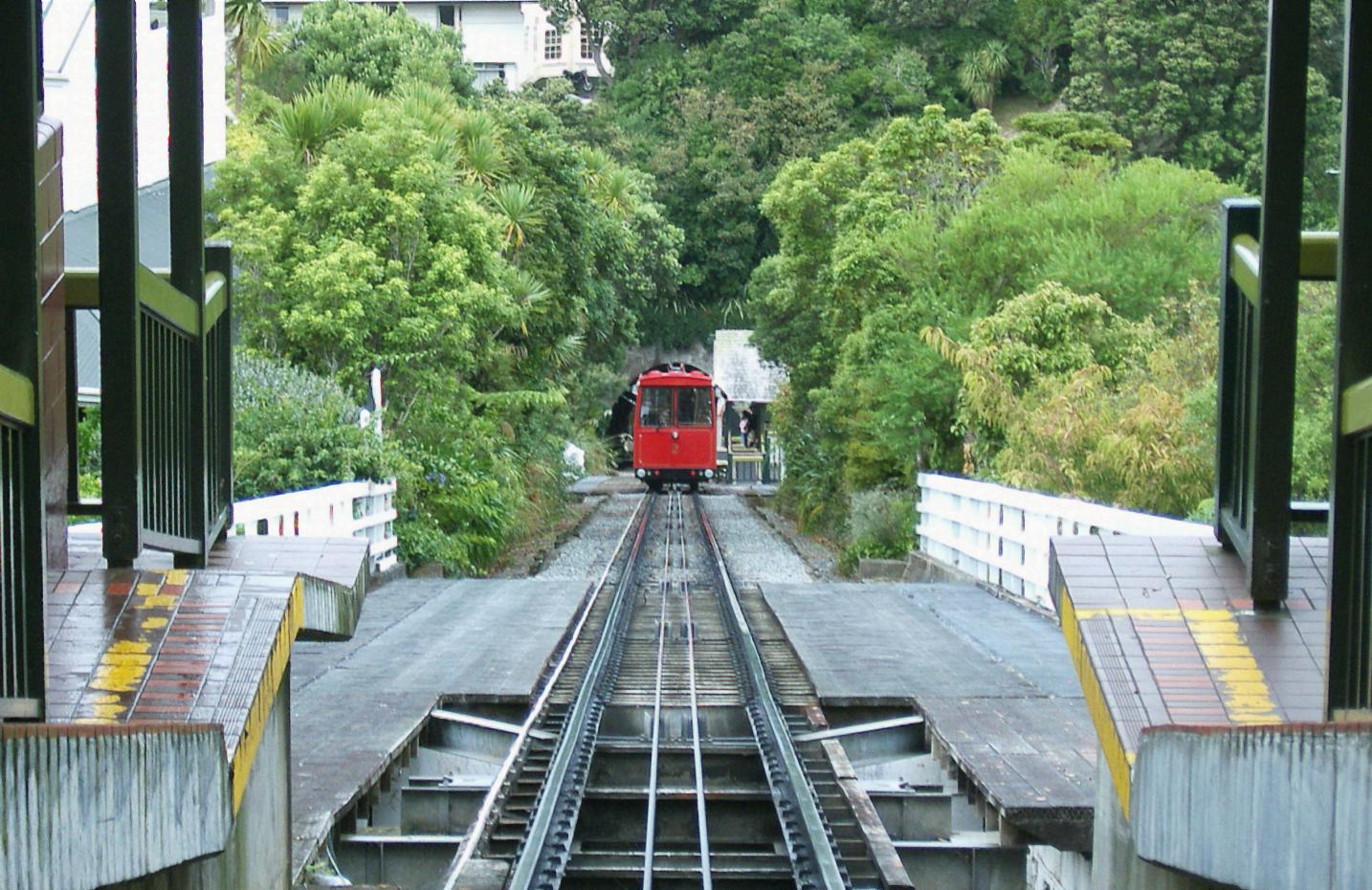
View down the track from the Kelburn terminus showing a car at Salamanca station. The two ends of the cable are between the rails

Initially, the refurbished Cable Car suffered a number of problems. The service was frequently interrupted for technical reasons and for extensive safety checks. Largely as a result of these problems, patronage dropped to a low of 500,000 in 1982. After a serious accident in 1988, which put the cars out of service for months, the system underwent a major revamp. This solved most of the problems and patronage has steadily increased since then. A major safety survey is conducted annually, usually in August and takes one week.

=== Deregulation ===
In 1991, when passenger transport was deregulated, there was speculation about the future of the Cable Car. Councils could no longer provide transport services directly, having to either privatise or corporatise their operations. The city council sold its bus operation, but due to public pressure it retained ownership of the Cable Car through Wellington Cable Car Ltd, and the trolleybus overhead wiring, with operations and maintenance were contracted out separately.

Initially both contracts were won by Harbour City Cable Car Ltd, a joint venture between the Stagecoach Group, which had purchased the buses, and East by West, a Wellington ferry operator. In 1994, the city council decided to carry out its own maintenance, and Wellington Cable Car Ltd established its own maintenance capacity. In 1997, the operations contract was won by Serco, which was later purchased by Transfield Services. Wellington Cable Car Ltd took the operation in-house in early 2007.

Cracks were discovered in the tunnel below Talavera station during the 1999 annual survey. These were fixed with metal anchoring and by coating the tunnel with reinforced concrete.

In July 2006, renovation of Lambton station began, to improve its looks and accessibility. The works were budgeted at $1.3 million, scheduled to be completed in early November. On 18 December the renovated station came into use, with automated turnstiles and a substantial fare price rise. Lingering problems with the ticketing system upgrade were fixed during the October 2007 annual survey. A new computer was also added to the winding mechanism during the survey which caused a few temporary issues with how smoothly the cars ran.

=== 2014–present ===
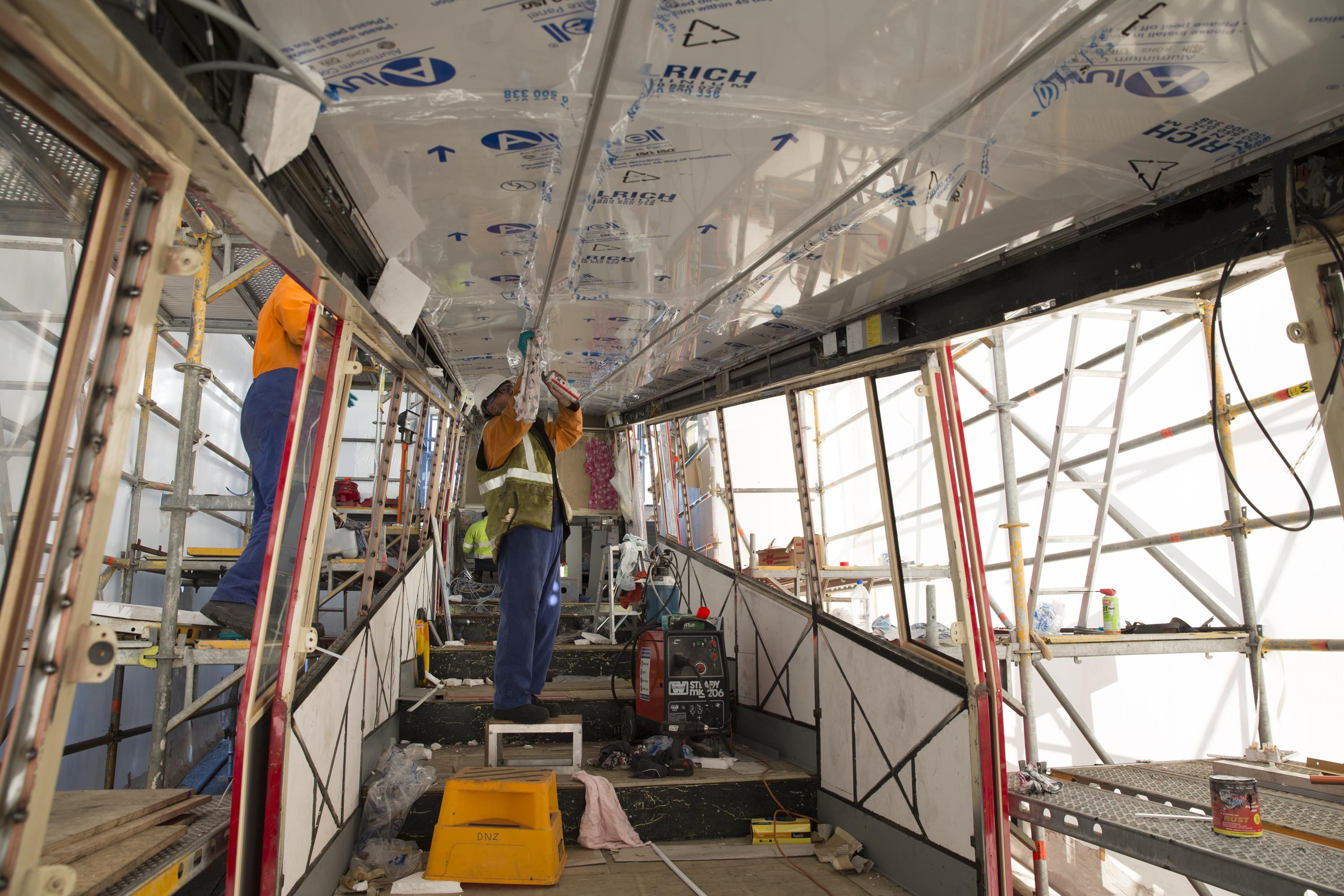
Refurbishing the inside of the cars, which involved removing the seats, flooring, ceiling, and glass windows.

In 2014, a temporary light display was installed in the cable car tunnels by Angus Muir as part of an arts festival. The lights were very popular, so the displays were expanded a year later to two tunnels and made permanent. The 45,000 LED lights can be programmed with different colours and patterns of movement for special events.

In 2016, the Cable Car underwent a major equipment upgrade to replace the electric drive and control system. Since the 1979 upgrade, each car had completed more than one million trips. The company also took the opportunity to cosmetically upgrade the existing cars and make changes to the staff facilities.

While the Cable Car was out of action, Wellington City Council also carried out construction work in Cable Car Lane and the Lambton Quay terminal. This included replacing the old leaky canopy with a new glass one; building a new ticket booth and moving the entry gates to make queuing and buying tickets easier; and new paving, signs and colour scheme for the heritage-listed Stonehams building.

In March 2022, the windows of the Kelburn terminal building were fitted with decals to help prevent bird strikes, as a wildlife conservation measure. The initiative was partly funded through crowd-sourcing undertaken by a local conservation organisation, the Urban Wildlife Trust.

In 2014 fare payments using Snapper cards started being accepted. In October 2023, Wellington Cable Car Ltd announced they would no longer accept Snapper payments.

In 2025, the Wellington Cable Car company's chief executive stated that the cars, electric drive and controls would be replaced in 2036.

== Tea kiosk / Skyline ==
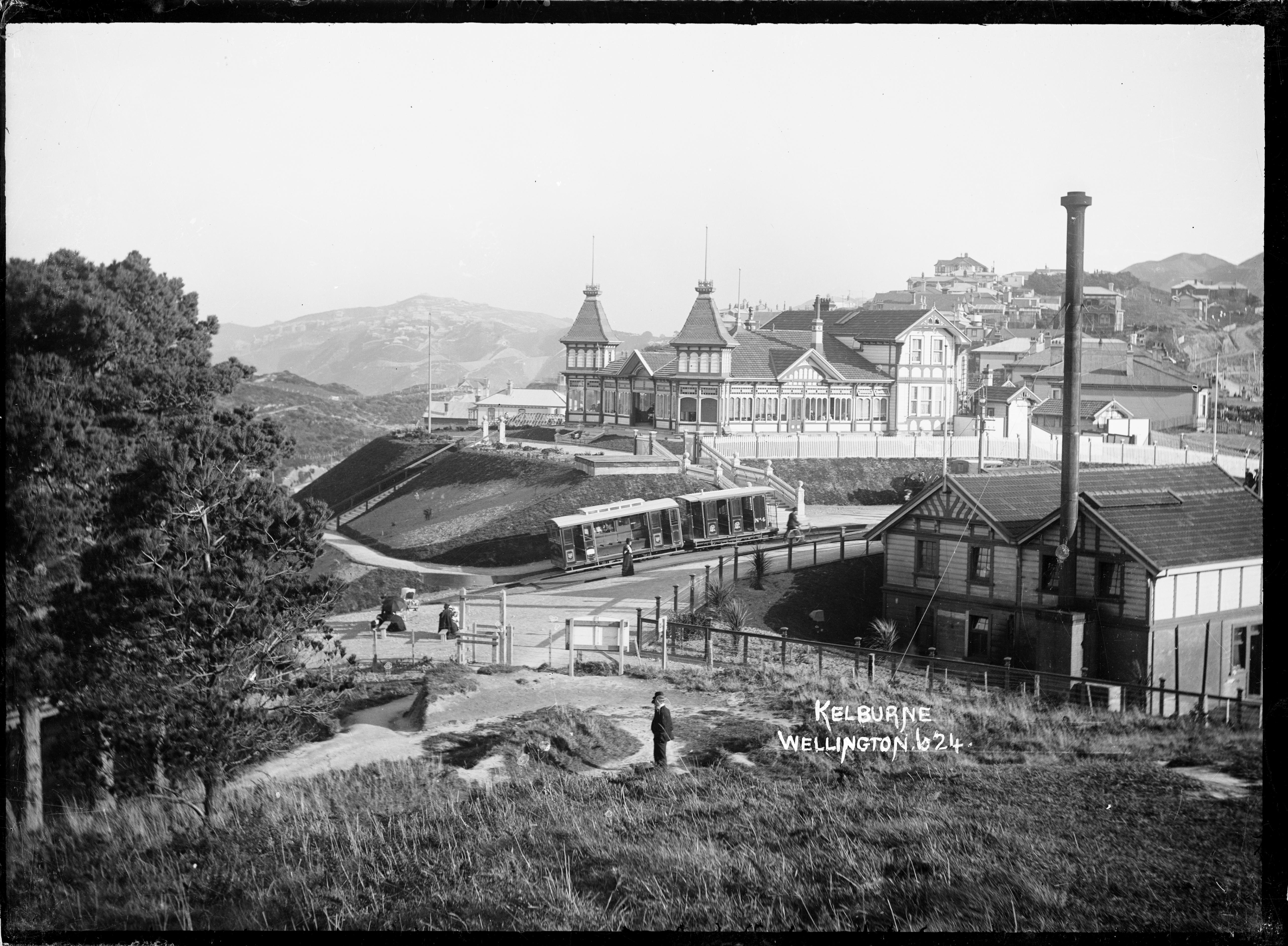
The Cable Car, tea kiosk and power house, early 1900s

In 1904, a tea kiosk was built at the top of the cable car line just south of the power house, on land owned by Wellington City Council and leased to the Kelburne and Karori Tramway Company. The kiosk was designed by architect John Swan and opened by the Mayor on 18 Jan 1905. There was a large, ornately decorated tea room in the centre of the wooden building. A verandah surrounded the building, and the corners were ornamented with "shapely" protruding towers. From its position on the hill, the building and grounds afforded "a magnificent panorama of the city and country, harbour, and Cook Strait". Being only a short cable car ride from the city and near the entrance to the Botanic Garden, the kiosk proved very popular. It was often used for municipal functions.

In 1941 the tea kiosk ceased operating, and the council considered converting the building for use as worker accommodation or demolishing it to make way for a block of flats. It was leased to a private company for use as a staff hostel during World War 2, and the council struggled to regain possession of the building after the war.

In 1957 the kiosk was redeveloped by architect Bruce Orchiston and reopened as 'Skyline', an upmarket restaurant and night club. The verandah was closed in to form a seating area around a dance floor.

By 1982 the building was unused. It was destroyed in an arson attack on 9 April 1982, with the blaze visible as far away as the Hutt Valley. A new award-winning building designed by Ian Athfield was constructed on the site and opened in 1984 as Skyline restaurant. The restaurant went into receivership in 1988 and since then a variety of businesses have operated from the building. As of 2026, Cabletop Eatery operates from the building.

== See also ==
- Trams in New Zealand
- Cable car (railway)
- Funicular
- List of funicular railways
- San Francisco cable car system
- Peak Tram
