= Charles Johnston (travel writer) =

British surgeon and writer (1812–1872)

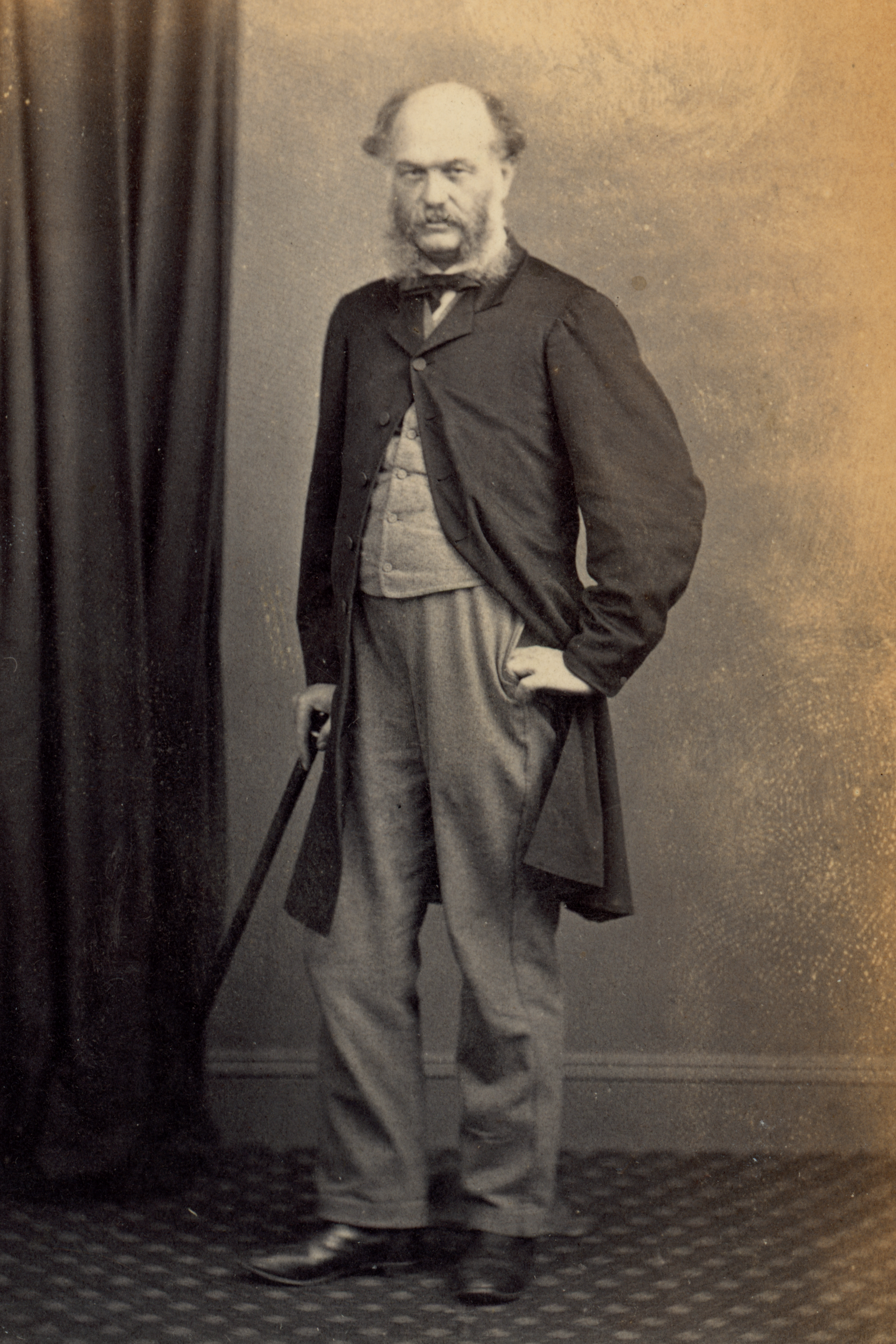
- Born: 12 March 1812; Manchester, United Kingdom
- Died: 16 July 1872 (aged 60); Barnstaple, United Kingdom
- Known for: Writing about Abyssinia (Ethiopia), founding Durban Botanic Gardens
- Notable work: Travels in Southern Abyssinia, Through the Country of Adal to the Kingdom of Shoa
- Spouse: Sarah (died 1850) Frances (m. 1854)

Member of the Colony of Natal Legislature
- In office 23 March 1857 – 1861

Charles Johnston MRCS (12 March 1812 – 16 July 1872) was a British surgeon, travel writer of Africa and founder of the Durban Botanic Gardens.

Johnston visited the Ethiopian Empire (then known as Abyssinia) in 1842 – 1843 and recorded his experience in a book titled Travels in Southern Abyssinia, Through the Country of Adal to the Kingdom of Shoa. His book forms an important historical account of the customs and culture of the region in the 1840s. He befriended the King of the Ethiopian kingdom of Shewa, Sahle Selassie, publishing in his book their conversations from various meetings. After his travels in Ethiopia he returned to England where he became assistant editor of the Lady's Newspaper. Some years later Johnston returned to Africa to settle in Durban, Colony of Natal (now part of South Africa), where he founded the Durban Botanic Gardens, which is now the oldest surviving botanic gardens in Africa. Johnston returned to England in 1861 and eventually settled in Barnstaple, Devon.

== Early life and education ==
Charles Johnston was the son of Thomas Johnston (1785–1866) and Elizabeth Johnston (1789–1867 née Woodiwis). Thomas Johnston was a successful silk and linen merchant who had emigrated from Scotland to England. Thomas settled for a time in Manchester where Charles Johnston was born. Thomas eventually settled in Birmingham becoming chairman of the Birmingham Water Works.

Charles Johnston had nine siblings who survived into adulthood: five sisters and four brothers. Johnston was the second eldest child and the eldest son. Three of Johnston's brothers followed him into the medical profession. Johnston was apprenticed at the age of 15 to a surgeon and apothecary called Edward Moore. He later attended Samuel Cox's 'School of Medicine and Surgery'. He became a licenciate of the Society of Apothecaries in 1833 and a member of the Royal College of Surgeons in 1835.

Johnston wrote that since boyhood he had wished for a "life of novel and wild adventure".

== Visit to the Ethiopian Empire (1842–1843) ==
=== Preparation and journey to the East African coast ===
In 1841 Johnston resigned a commission with the East India Company, with whom he was employed as a ship's surgeon, so that he could take an opportunity to explore East Africa. Johnston obtained letters of introduction from the British Indian government to Captain Haines the colonial administrator of Aden and to Captain Harris the British ambassador to the Kingdom of Shewa, within the Ethiopian Empire. Johnston stayed in Aden for several weeks before he received an offer from Captain Haines to be put in charge of a mission to take supplies to the British Embassy in Shewa. Johnston began his journey into East Africa by sailing from Aden to Tadjoura in February 1842 aboard the brig-of-war Euphrates captained by John Young. From there he intended to take the supplies to the embassy in Shewa. Whilst in Tadjoura he met with the local ruler, described as a sultan. Johnston was however unable to travel further on this occasion upon the advice of Captain Young, who felt that the local inhabitants of Tadjoura were unwilling to assist the mission. He therefore returned on the ship Euphrates to Aden.

Captain Haines believed that it was the presence of a war ship which had made the inhabitants of Tadjoura unwilling to assist the mission. It was therefore arranged that Johnston would approach Tadjoura on a local vessel from the city of Berbera. In Berbera Johnston met with Sharmarke Ali Saleh, the most powerful man in the region. Saleh loaned Johnston a local vessel for his onward journey to Tadjoura. Johnston returned to Tadjoura aboard the vessel on 6 March 1842.

=== Journey inland to Shewa ===
Johnston commenced his inland journey from Tadjoura with the supplies to Shewa on 27 March travelling with a camel caravan.

On 5 April 1842 Johnston reached Lake Assal. A safe passage was agreed through the territory of a local tribe Johnston called the 'Muditu' for the price of two bags of rice, date fruits and three pieces of calico. However, despite the agreement, on 10 April a slave belonging to one of the camel-owners in the caravan was murdered under cover of darkness, supposedly by the Muditu.

On 17 April 1842 Johnston came within one hour's journey of Lake Abbe, where the Awash River terminates. He wished to visit the shores of the lake, which he believed to have never before been visited by European explorers. He offered 25 dollars for accompaniment to the lake. However, his travel companions refused because the area was controlled by a hostile tribe. Johnston then resolved to visit the lake himself, but was persuaded not to go, after being told that death would be the certain consequence.

On 7 May 1842 Johnston recorded that another slave who was travelling with the camel caravan was murdered. The assailant celebrated by publicly wearing a black feather in his hair and received no punishment other than a fine of five bullocks paid by his friends collectively. Johnston was disgusted and thereafter always addressed the assailant with the biblical name of Cain. On 17 May 1842 Johnston was informed that one of the men hired to protect him called Esau Ibrahim had threatened to kill him. He decided to get this man away from him, by paying him two dollars to travel ahead of the camel caravan, with a letter to Shewa announcing his arrival. On 20 May 1842 Johnston crossed the Awash River into the Kingdom of Shewa.

=== Political difficulties on arrival in Shewa ===
On 22 May 1842 Johnston reached what he described as the first frontier station of Shewa, a place he called Dinnomalee. This was a place where camel caravans were received and paid duties to the governor of the area. Johnston was provided with accommodation at a settlement called Farree, the first time Johnston had slept in a house since leaving Tadjoura in March.

Johnston subsequently met with the local governor known as Walasma Mahomed, who was a hereditary governor of the Ifat province within Shewa and claimed descent from the military leader Ahmad ibn Ibrahim al-Ghazi, who had invaded Abyssinia three centuries earlier. All the diplomatic correspondence Johnston had with him for the British Embassy was confiscated. Johnston told Wallasmah Mahomed that Queen Victoria would be angry when she heard how her embassy’s correspondence was confiscated, but Wallasmah Mahomed responded by threatening to put Johnston in chains. Johnston was told that he could not travel onwards to the British Embassy in the capital Ankober, but must remain at Farree, until the King Sahle Selassie gave orders that he could advance. Two sentinels kept watch over Johnston to ensure his compliance. Eventually members of the British Embassy became aware of Johnston’s captivity and Mr Scott, a surveying draftsman attached to the embassy, rode to meet Johnston. However, Scott was told that as he had travelled without permission, he too was now captive until the King decided he could leave.

On 30 May 1842 a message arrived from the King that Johnston could proceed to a settlement called Angolalla, which was West of Ankober. On 31 May Johnston set off for Ankober, passing through a town called Aliyu Amba on the journey. At Ankober he dined at the recently established British Embassy, before travelling onwards the same day to Angolalla, where he met with the ambassador Captain Harris. The supplies Johnston had brought with him were taken to Angolalla and deposited in the palace yard, where the King commanded that they should be opened in his presence. After the first few were opened he gave permission for the British Embassy to take them.

=== Stay in Shewa ===
Johnston left Angolalla to return to Ankober where he stayed several days at the embassy, before travelling to more permanent accommodation in Aliyu Amba. On the first day of his arrival, he experienced a return of the fever which he had suffered from in Bombay and Aden.

Ten days after leaving Ankober, Johnston was told by the local governor that the King had ordered him to leave Shewa. Johnston bribed the governor to allow him to travel to Angolalla to try and obtain an audience with the King. On 30 June 1842 the King granted him an audience. Johnston gifted the King Chinese silk velvet and a bead purse containing a ring carved from jasper. Johnston asked to be allowed to stay in Shewa until after the rainy season and then to be given the King's assistance to travel to Enarea. The King agreed to his request. The King subsequently sent a message to Johnston requiring him to take plenty of medicine and to learn Amharic in preparation for their next meeting.

On 4 August 1842 the King asked Johnston to manufacture gunpowder for him. The Abyssinians already manufactured gunpowder locally, but Johnston considered it to be of inferior quality. The King sent a scribe to record the proportions of each ingredient Johnston used. On 12 August Johnston travelled to see the King at a place Johnston called Myolones, where he was granted an audience with the King and presented him with a bottle of the gunpowder he had manufactured. He also gave a Spanish black lace veil for the Queen Bezabish. On 13 August the King asked Johnston to inspect and give his opinion on firearms from his armoury and to choose the best firearm. Johnston selected a gun manufactured by Theophilus Richards of Birmingham, which the King remarked to be his favourite. The King indicated that he wanted Johnston to teach his servants how to make guns. In a further audience with the King in September, the King and Johnston discussed European gun technology and the manufacture of dyes. Johnston undertook to cultivate indigo for the King and teach his people how to manufacture it. The King declared this knowledge would be more useful than all the gifts he had received from the British Embassy.

In 1843 Johnston left Shewa, travelling with the British diplomats on the conclusion of their stay in Shewa.

== Settlement in Durban (1849–1861) ==
Johnston arrived in Durban in October 1849 aboard a ship called the John Gibson.

In the same year as his first arrival in Durban, Johnston founded the Durban Botanic Gardens. However, the death of his first wife in 1850 caused him to resign his position of managing the gardens.

Johnston entered local politics in Durban and became one of the first councillors in Durban to be elected in the first local election on 2 August 1854. Johnston was later elected to the Natal Legislative Council in the 1857 Natal parliamentary election.

On 19 November 1851 Johnston obtained a licence to practise medicine in Natal. He was one of the earliest medical practitioners to practise in Durban. During 1857 he published by subscription his Observations Upon Disease in Natal and in 1860, towards the end of Johnston's residence in Durban, he published a book titled Observations on Health and Disease, and on the Physical Economy of Human Life, in Natal. Johnston left Durban in 1861 and returned to England.

== Publications ==
Johnston, Charles (1844). Travels in Southern Abyssinia, Through the Country of Adal to the Kingdom of Shoa. London: J Madden and Co.

Johnston, Charles (1847). "Medical Etiquette". The Medical Directory.

Johnston, Charles (1860). Observations on Health and Disease, and on the Physical Economy of Human Life, in Natal. Pietermaritzburg: May and Davis.

Johnston, Charles (1863). "Contributions to a History of Barnstaple". North Devon Journal.

Johnston, Charles (1867–1868). "St Anne's Chapel. The Grammar School, Barnstaple". Report and Transactions of the Devonshire Association. 2.

== Engravings from drawings by Johnston of Ethiopia ==
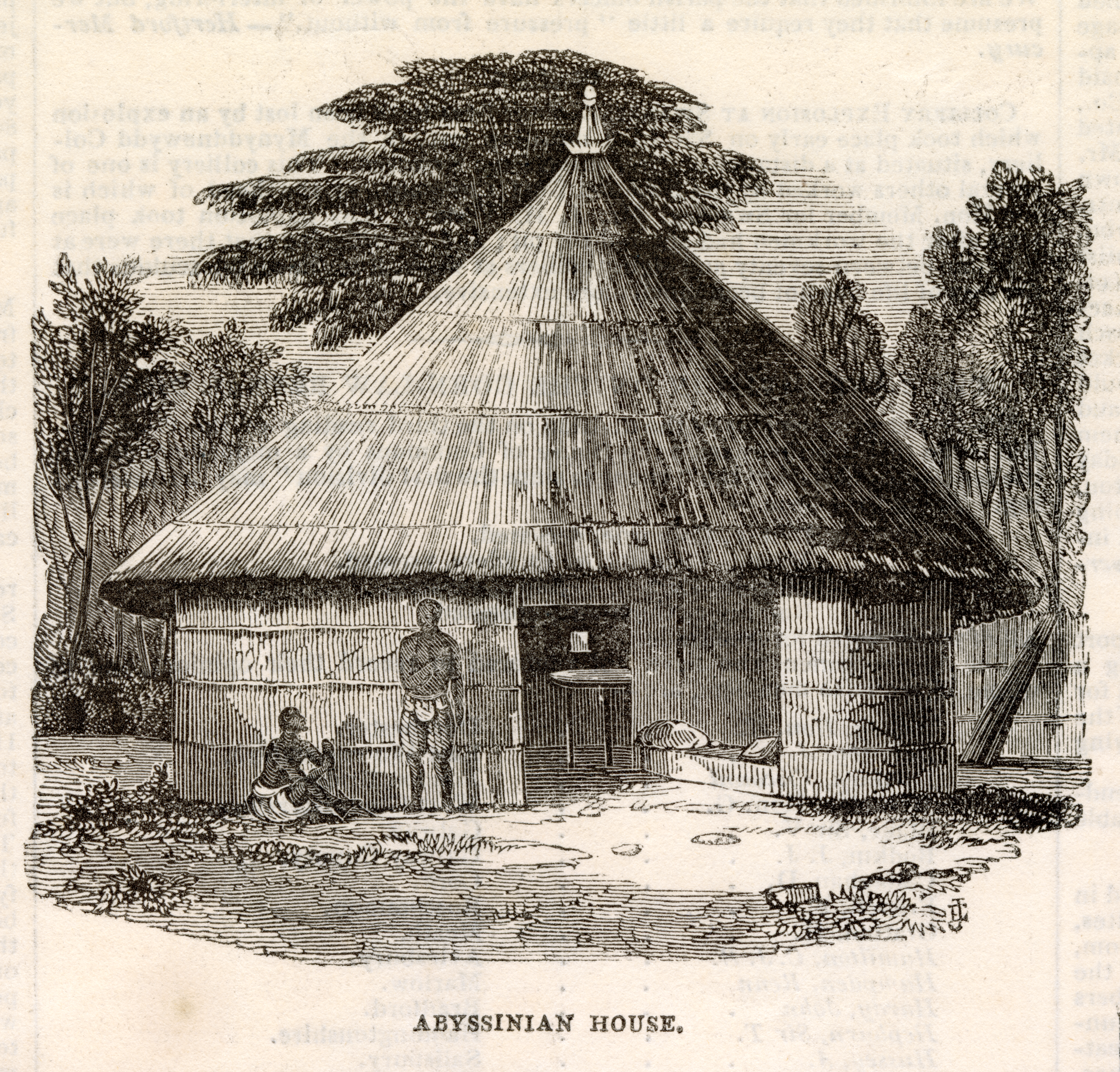
Abyssinian House

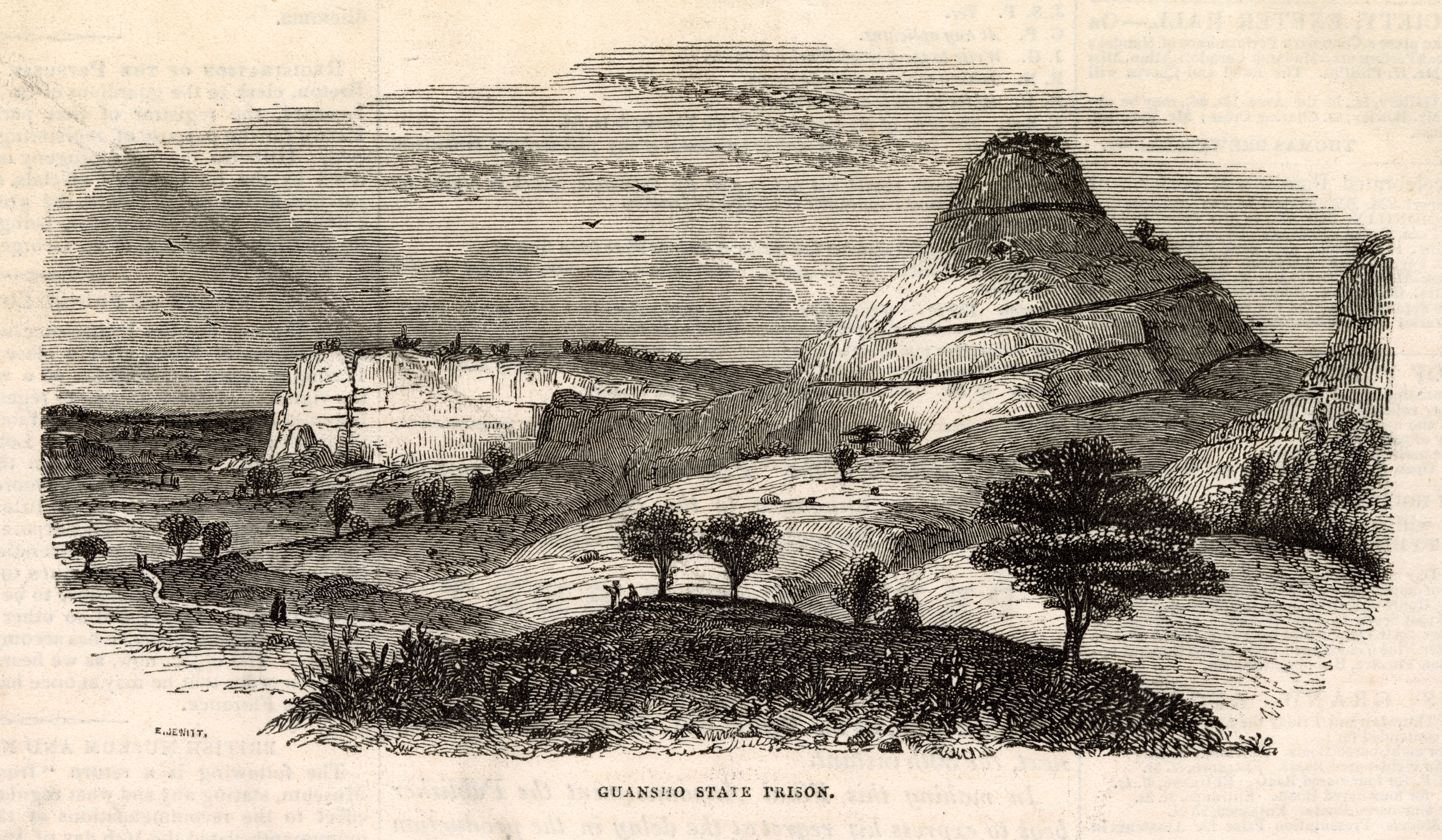
Guansho State Prison

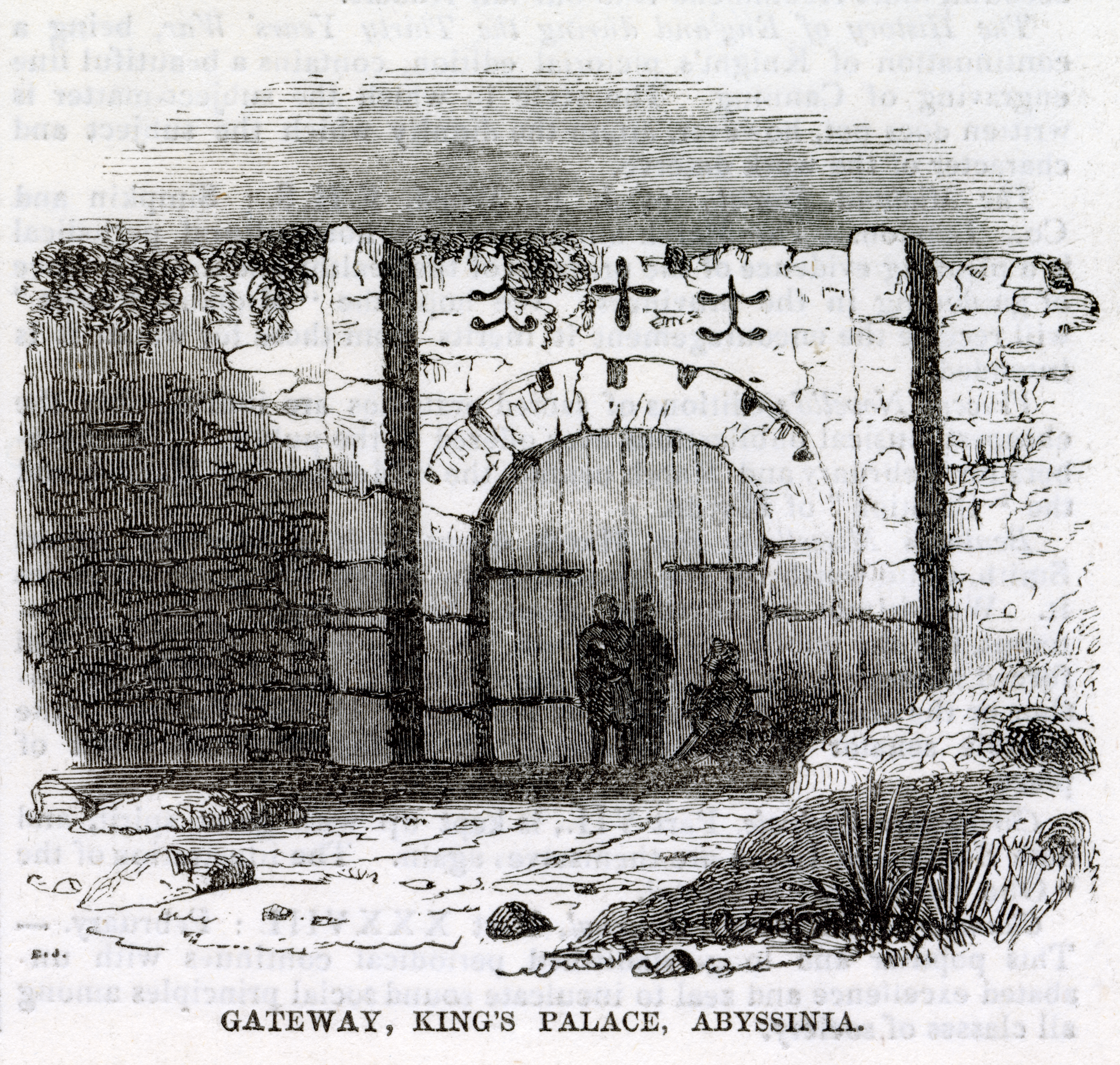
Gateway to the King's Palace
