= Goldie's Brae =

Historic building in Wadestown, Wellington, New Zealand

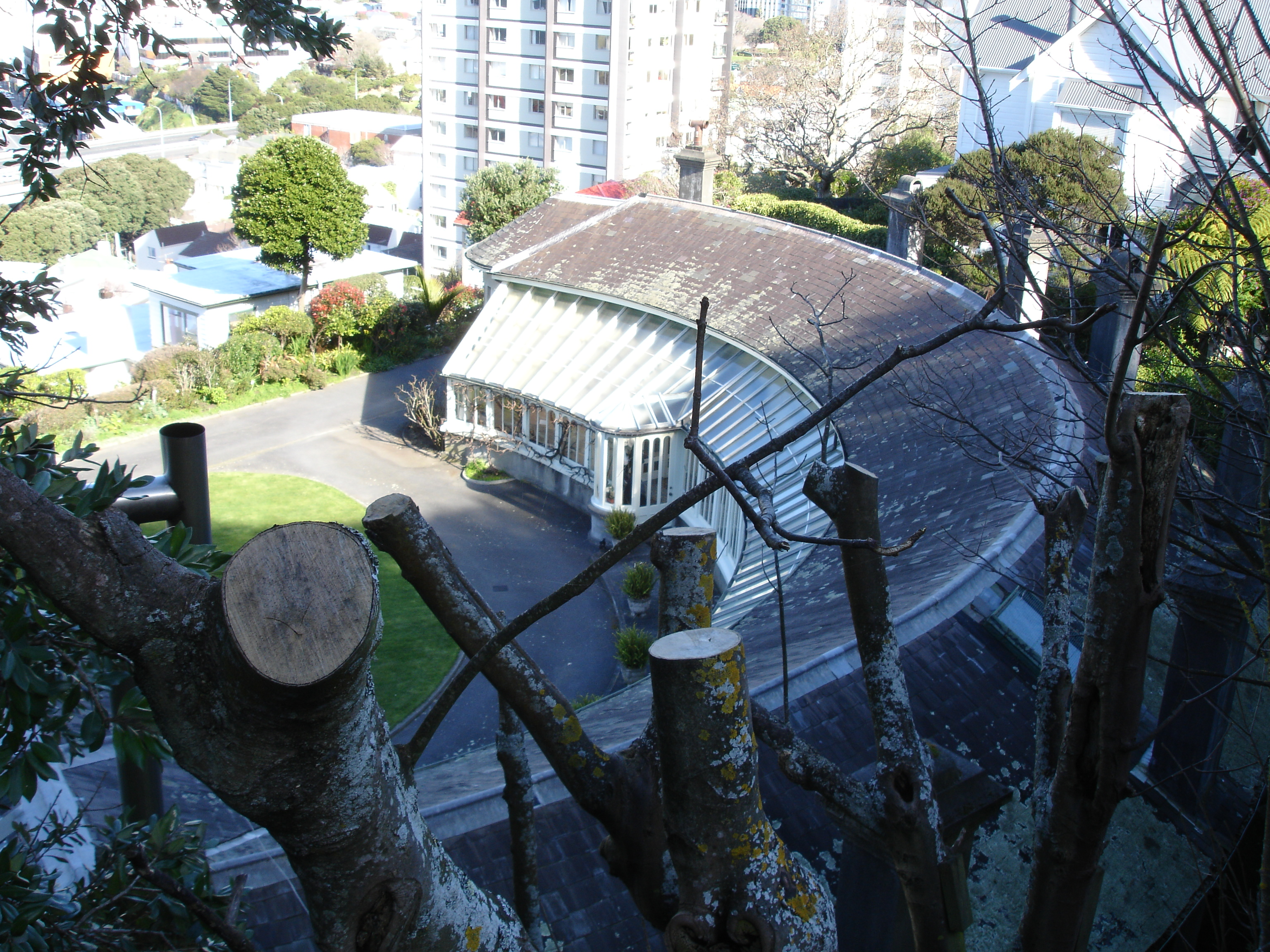
- Part of the house seen from Grosvenor Terrace
- Interactive map of the Goldie's Brae area

General information
- Location: 4 Goldies Brae, Wadestown, Wellington, New Zealand
- Coordinates: 41.267333°S 174.780153°E
- Completed: 1876

Design and construction
- Architect: Dr Alexander Johnston

Heritage New Zealand – Category 1
- Official name: Goldie's Brae
- Designated: 18-Mar-1982
- Reference no.: 216

Goldie's Brae (now 4 Goldies Brae and sometimes referred to as "the banana house" or "crescent house") is a historic building in Wadestown, Wellington, New Zealand classified as a "Category I" ("places of special or outstanding historical or cultural heritage significance or value") historic place by the New Zealand Historic Places Trust. It is considered remarkable for its relatively new construction material, concrete, and its eccentricity of design. It was designed by its original owner Dr Alexander Johnston, the Provincial Surgeon of Wellington.

== Architect ==
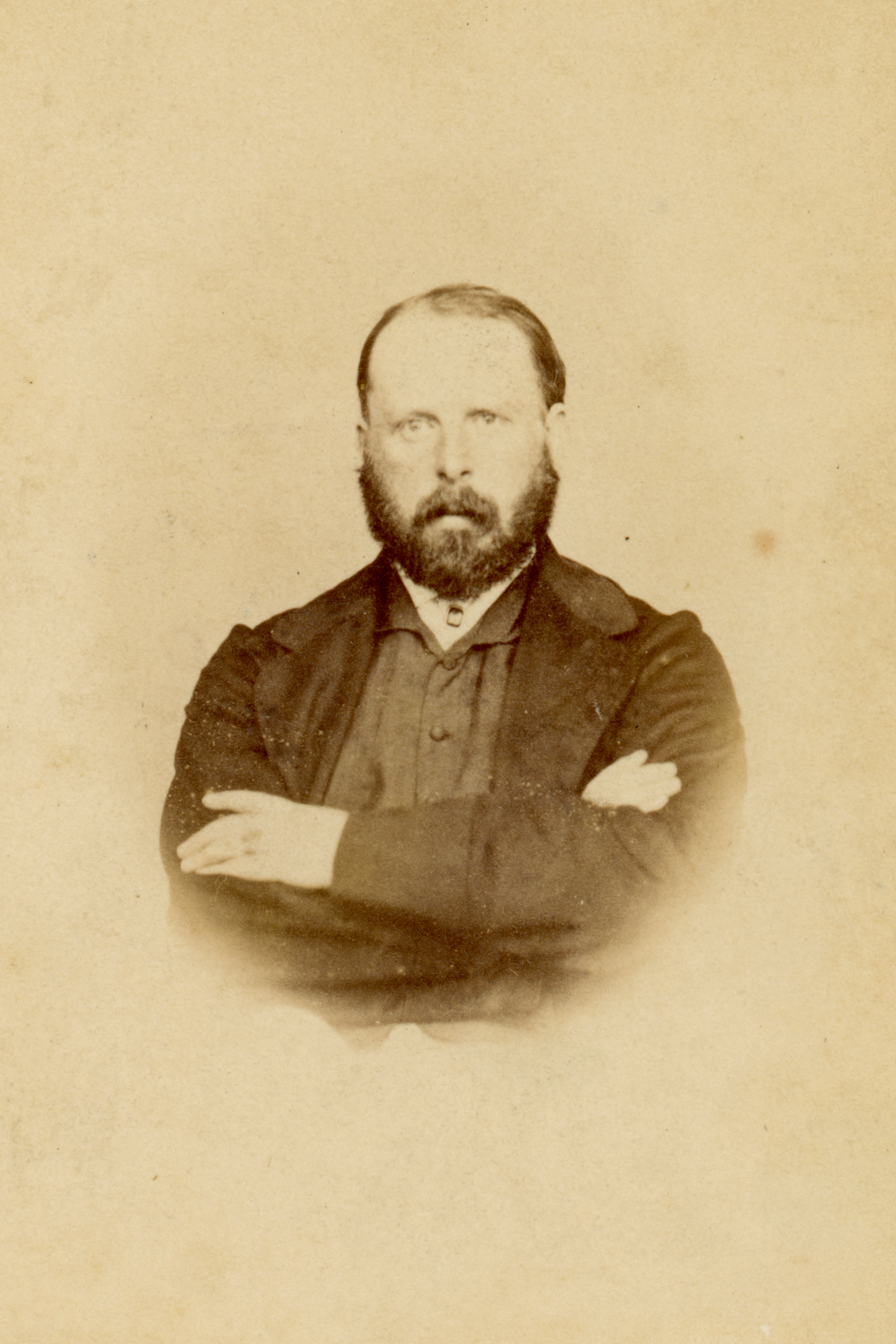
Dr Alexander Johnston

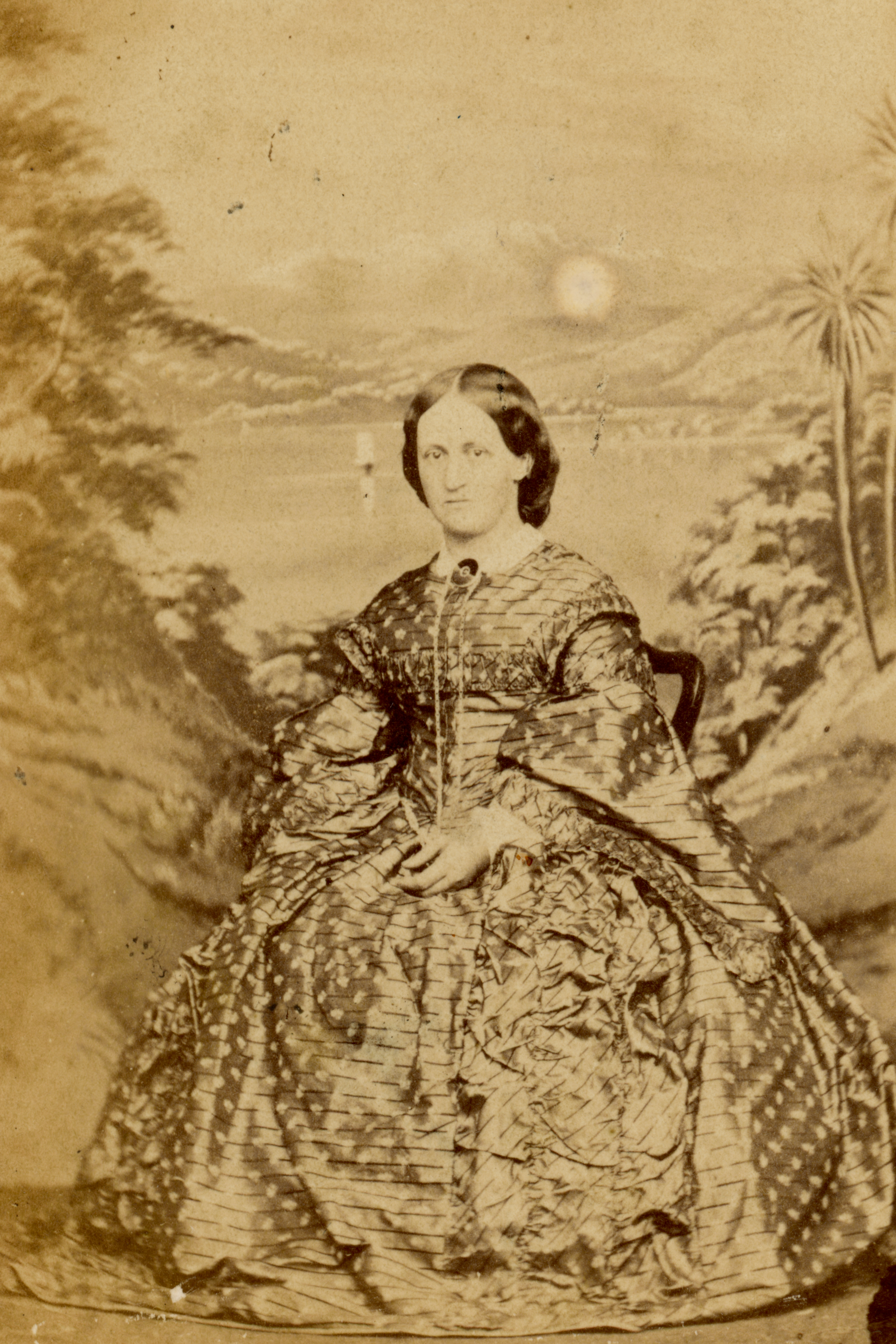
Emily Harriet Johnston (née Acland)

The architect and first occupier Dr Alexander Johnston and his wife Emily Johnston (née Acland).

Alexander Johnston M.D. (1825–1895) was born in Birmingham, England to Thomas Johnston (1785–1866) and Elizabeth Johnston (1789—1867 née Woodiwis). Alexander's father was a successful silk and linen merchant.

Alexander emigrated from England to New Zealand. By travelling to a region geographically remote from Britain, Alexander was following a precedent set by his elder brothers. Alexander's eldest brother was the notable traveller of Abyssinia, Charles Johnston, who by the 1850s had settled in Durban.

On 2 September 1856 at St Paul's Church in Auckland, Alexander married Emily Harriette Acland (1837–1898). Emily's father Charles Acland (1814–1845) had been an English clergyman in the employment of the East India Company in India, where he had died at the age of 31, when Emily was still a child. Emily had remained in England, whilst her father worked in India. A book of his correspondence from India to Emily and her two siblings, had been published in 1847.

Alexander became the coroner and (Wellington) Provincial Surgeon in charge of the Provincial Hospital in Thorndon for twenty years until 1879. Alexander retired in 1889 and he and Emily returned to England, settling in London where Alexander died in September 1895 aged 70.

== Description ==
1882

"To Be Let, that delightfully situated Villa Residence, known as Goldie's Brae, Wadestown, the property of Dr Johnston, with about five acres of land, ornamentally laid out and planted, and the whole commanding a magnificent view of the city and harbour. The house contains drawing, dining, and morning rooms, five bedrooms, kitchen etc., all on the ground floor, and fitted with every modern convenience. Stable, cart-house, and other out-offices. Large garden and orchard, with numerous fruit trees in full bearing. A never-failing spring of pure water is laid on to the house. For further particulars apply to . . ."

1894

"To Be Let or Sold, that fine property . . . four acres . . . large house, cottage, and stable, all built of concrete. The view of the harbour is unsurpassed . . ."

1982

A segmental plan form with a continuous glazed gallery or conservatory providing internal access and solar heating to each of its ten rooms.

== Subdivision ==
A road was constructed across the property from Grant Road, it is now Grosvenor Terrace but was then named Queen's Terrace, and J H Bethune & Co auctioned ten building sites within the property in July 1904.
