= 1857 Natal parliamentary election =

Elections to the Legislative Council were held in the Colony of Natal for the first time in February 1857. They were the first elections after the territory had become a British Colony.

Following the elections, the 15-seat Legislative Council met for the first time on 23 March in the government schoolroom in Pietermaritzburg, and was opened by the Governor the following day. Donald Moodie was elected as Speaker.
