= James Hutton Mackenzie =

James Hutton Mackenzie (27 September 1849–10 July 1949) was a New Zealand presbyterian minister. He was born in Thornhill, Dumfriesshire, Scotland on 27 September 1849.
