= Thomas King Observatory =

Observatory in New Zealand

Coordinates: 41.28456°S 174.76779°E

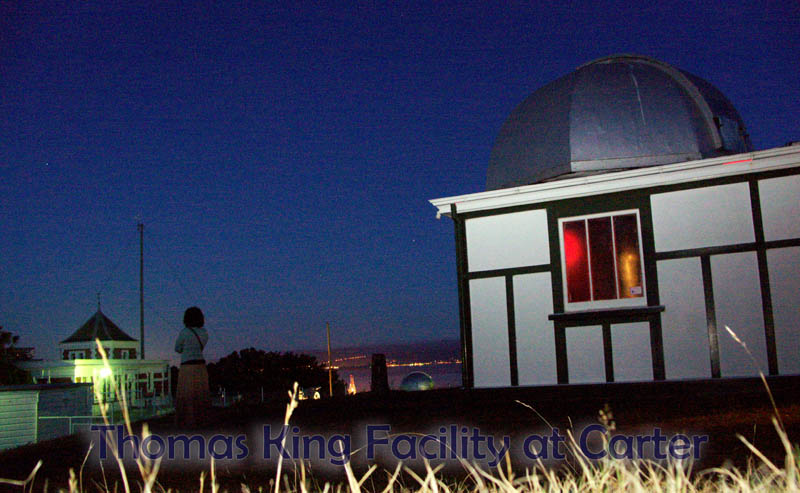
Carter Observatory - Thomas King Observatory

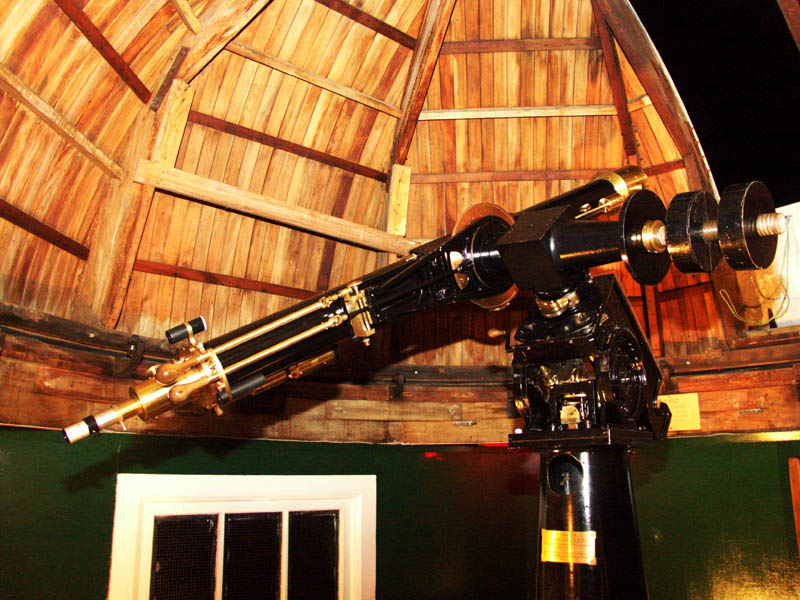
Carter Observatory - Thomas Cooke telescope

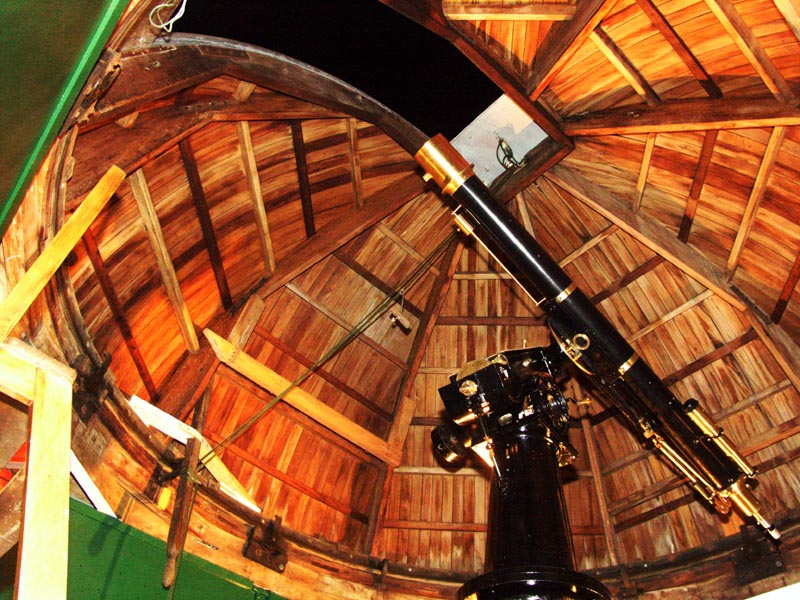
Carter Observatory - Thomas Cooke telescope

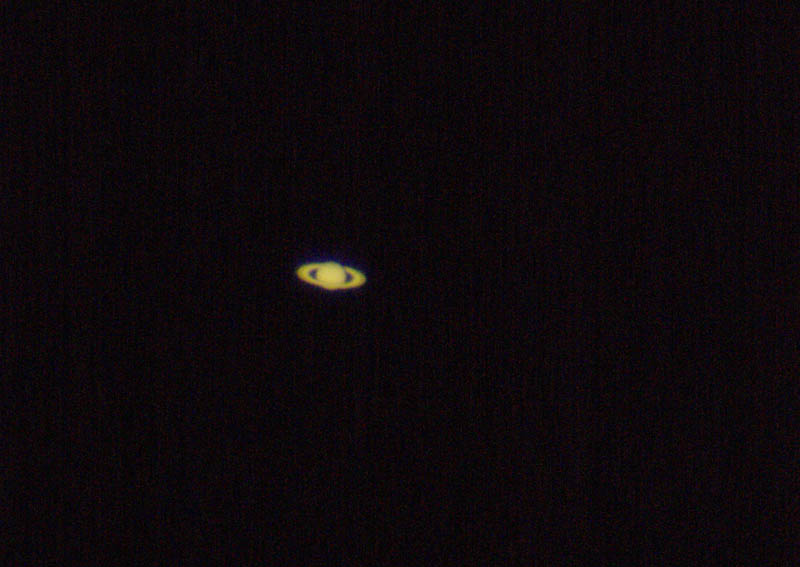
Saturn - Thomas Cooke telescope

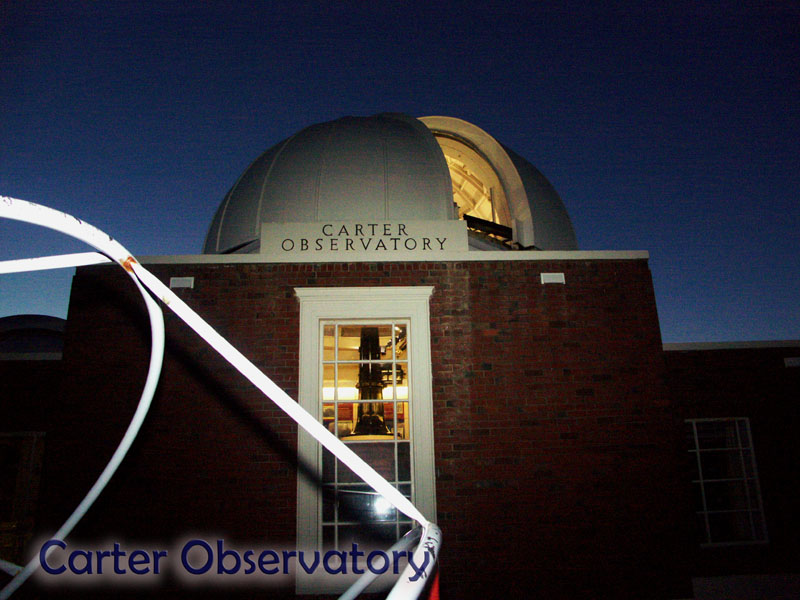
Carter Observatory

The Thomas King Observatory stands at the top of the Botanic Garden in Wellington, New Zealand, as part of the Carter Observatory. In the past it has housed research, preservation of heritage, education and promotion of astronomy to the public.

== Facilities ==
In May 2001 refurbishment began of the 5-inch Grubb telescope housed in the Thomas King Observatory. This telescope was made in 1882 by Grubb in Dublin and over its 120 years it is in remarkably good condition. The Thomas King Observatory, was used until recently for public viewing of the sun during the day. The hydrogen-alpha filter used to view the sun through the Thomas King refractor has now moved to one of the telescopes mounted to the side of the Thomas Cooke refractor, in the main observatory building.

== History ==
In the 1910s, members of the Wellington Philosophical Society formed an Astronomical Section to promote the study of astronomy and to erect an observatory for star-gazing. At this time, the local observatory—the Hector Observatory—was primarily used by the government for time-keeping and weather observations.

On 1 July 2021 (effective from 21 July 2021), Heritage New Zealand added the Thomas King Observatory to the heritage list as a Category II historic place.

== See also ==
- Thomas King (astronomer)
- Thomas Cooke
- Carter Observatory
- Gifford Observatory, also located in Wellington.
- The Ruth Crisp telescope an article on the Boller and Chivens telescope at the Carter Observatory.
- Dominion Observatory
