= UFO sightings in New Zealand =

List of alleged UFO sightings in the nation of New Zealand

The most widely reported UFO incident in New Zealand, and the only one investigated, involved the Kaikōura lights, which were encountered by aircraft, filmed by a news crew, and tracked by radar in December 1978. The New Zealand Defence Force does not take an official interest in UFO reports, but in December 2010 it released files on hundreds of purported UFO sightings. New Zealand's then-Minister of Defence, Wayne Mapp, said at the time that people could "make what they will" of the reports, and further stated that "a quick scan of the files indicates that virtually everything has a natural explanation".

== 1950s ==
- In 1955, the captain of a National Airways Corporation aircraft reported seeing a light that showed apparent movement as well as changes in colour and intensity. The Director of Intelligence at the Carter Observatory had come to the conclusion that it was Venus as it rose in the night sky.
- A Blenheim farmer claimed to have seen lights and a UFO containing two men in silvery suits in the early morning of 13 July 1959.

== 1970s ==
- The 21 December 1978 incident in the Kaikōura area attracted media attention throughout New Zealand and Australia. The crew of a cargo plane reported strange lights over the Kaikōura Ranges and a Wellington radar team reported inexplicable readings. These were filmed by a news crew over several nights.

== 2010s ==
- On 12 April 2011, a family in Hāwera observed a fireball-like UFO at 8:55 PM, capturing the incident on camera. One witness stated it resembled a pyramid shape with a round top; later on, it appeared to "cool down" with a red ring resembling a heating element. A week prior, a member of the Hāwera Observatory and Astronomical Society observed a similar incident. A local dairy worker reported a similar sighting in the area on 17 January of the same year.
- In June 2016, a spherical UFO was caught on camera near the city of Christchurch, which rapidly changed colours and sped away after two hours. Two sightings of the object occurred, with both being captured on camera. The changes in colour appeared to be coordinated in the second sighting, which involved two objects.
- On 31 March 2019, a couple spotted two lights hovering 200 m (660 ft) above the water in Karekare Beach in West Auckland. One of the two objects they reported changed colour and quickly flew away. The couple later spotted five others displaying erratic flight patterns and changing their colour.

== 2020s ==
- A woman residing in Porirua witnessed three objects hovering over the city on the morning of 3 August 2020. She captured the objects on film and shared them on a local Facebook group, where another resident commented that he saw the same objects.

== See also ==
- Bruce Cathie, a New Zealand author who has written about flying saucers
- UFO sightings in Australia
- List of reported UFO sightings
