= Black Birch scientific facilities =

Astronomical and scientific facilities on Black Birch Range, New Zealand

- Organization: United States Naval Observatory, Carter Observatory, JANZOS Collaboration
- Location: Black Birch Range, Marlborough, New Zealand
- Coordinates: 41°45′11″S 173°46′35″E
- Altitude: ~1,600 m (5,200 ft)
- Established: 1984 (USNO), 1978 (Ruth Crisp)
- Closed: 1996 (USNO), 1994 (JANZOS)

Telescopes
- USNO Transit Circle: 7-inch transit circle
- Twin Astrograph: 8-inch photographic astrograph
- Ruth Crisp Telescope: 16-inch Boller & Chivens Cassegrain

The Black Birch Range, located near Blenheim in the Marlborough region of New Zealand, has hosted a number of astronomical and scientific installations. The site was selected for its high altitude, low levels of light pollution, and stable atmospheric conditions, which made it suitable for observational astronomy and related research.

== History ==
The Black Birch Range was identified in the mid-20th century as a suitable location for astronomical research due to its dark skies, high elevation, and stable atmospheric conditions.

In the early 1960s, New Zealand astronomer Frank Bateson conducted site testing at Black Birch using portable instruments supplied by the United States Naval Observatory (USNO). Bateson lived on-site in a small hut during this period and recorded data on sky clarity and temperature stability, using the same equipment previously employed by USNO for site evaluations in the United States.

Local residents in the Marlborough region assisted by constructing access roads and connecting electricity to the site, enabling the temporary testing facility to operate. Although Mount John in Lake Tekapo was ultimately selected for New Zealand's national observatory, Bateson's work at Black Birch contributed to the site's recognition as a viable location for international research. His surveys are credited with laying the groundwork for the later establishment of the USNO's Southern Hemisphere station at Black Birch.

== Astronomical observatories ==
=== Black Birch Astrometric Observatory (USNO) ===
The Black Birch Astrometric Observatory was established by the United States Naval Observatory (USNO) and operated from 1984 to 1996. Its primary focus was high-precision astrometry in the Southern Hemisphere, supporting the development of accurate celestial reference frames used in navigation and astronomical research.

The observatory was equipped with a 7-inch transit circle for positional measurements of stars and an 8-inch twin astrograph, which was used for photographic imaging of the night sky. Data from the facility contributed to USNO star catalogs, including the W2J00 reference catalogue.

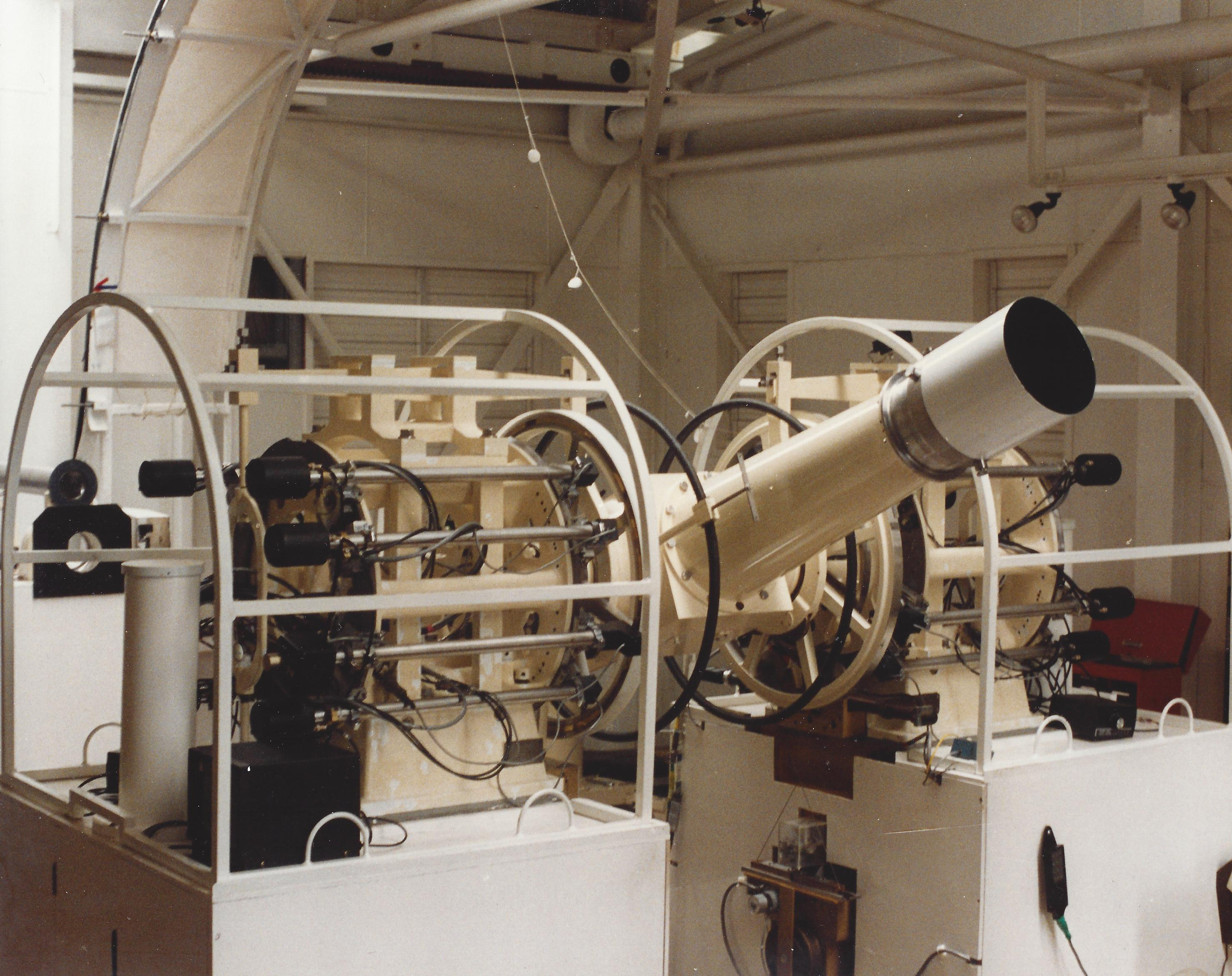
USNO Black Birch 7-inch Astrometric Telescope, c. 1995

Following the observatory's closure in the mid-1990s, some of its components—such as the dome—were repurposed. According to New Zealand Geographic, these materials were provided to astronomer Gordon Hudson and contributed to the formation of the Phoenix Astronomical Society, which went on to establish public astronomy facilities in the Wairarapa.

=== Ruth Crisp Telescope facility ===
The Ruth Crisp Telescope, a 16-inch (41 cm) Boller and Chivens Cassegrain reflector, was donated to the Carter Observatory in Wellington in 1968 by New Zealand philanthropist Ruth Crisp. In 1978, the telescope was relocated to the Black Birch Range to take advantage of darker skies and improved atmospheric conditions for astronomical observation.

The facility was established near the summit of the range, at approximately 1,600 metres elevation, adjacent to the U.S. Naval Observatory's Black Birch station. It served as an outstation for Carter Observatory and was operated independently by New Zealand-based institutions.

The telescope was housed in a dedicated dome and used for general astronomical research and public education. It remained in use at Black Birch until the mid-1990s, when the dome and telescope were dismantled. The instrument was returned to Carter Observatory shortly thereafter.

=== JANZOS Cosmic Ray observatory ===
The JANZOS (Japan, Australia, New Zealand Observation of Supernova) project was an international collaboration established in 1987 to search for high-energy gamma rays from Supernova 1987A in the Large Magellanic Cloud.

Located near the summit of the Black Birch Range at approximately 1,600 metres elevation, the JANZOS observatory comprised 76 scintillation detectors arranged over five hectares, as well as three Cherenkov telescopes. The instruments were designed to detect cosmic rays and gamma rays in the energy range of 10¹² to 10¹⁵ electronvolts (eV).

Although no gamma-ray signal from SN1987A was detected, the observatory operated continuously until 1994 and contributed to the study of high-energy astrophysical phenomena. The project also helped establish long-term scientific cooperation between Japan and New Zealand.

=== Other scientific uses ===
An outstation of the Carter Observatory was established at Black Birch to take advantage of the site's darker skies and more stable atmospheric conditions, relative to those in Wellington. The facility was used to support observational astronomy and research projects in conjunction with Carter's main operations.
