= Kaikōura lights =

1978 New Zealand UFO sightings

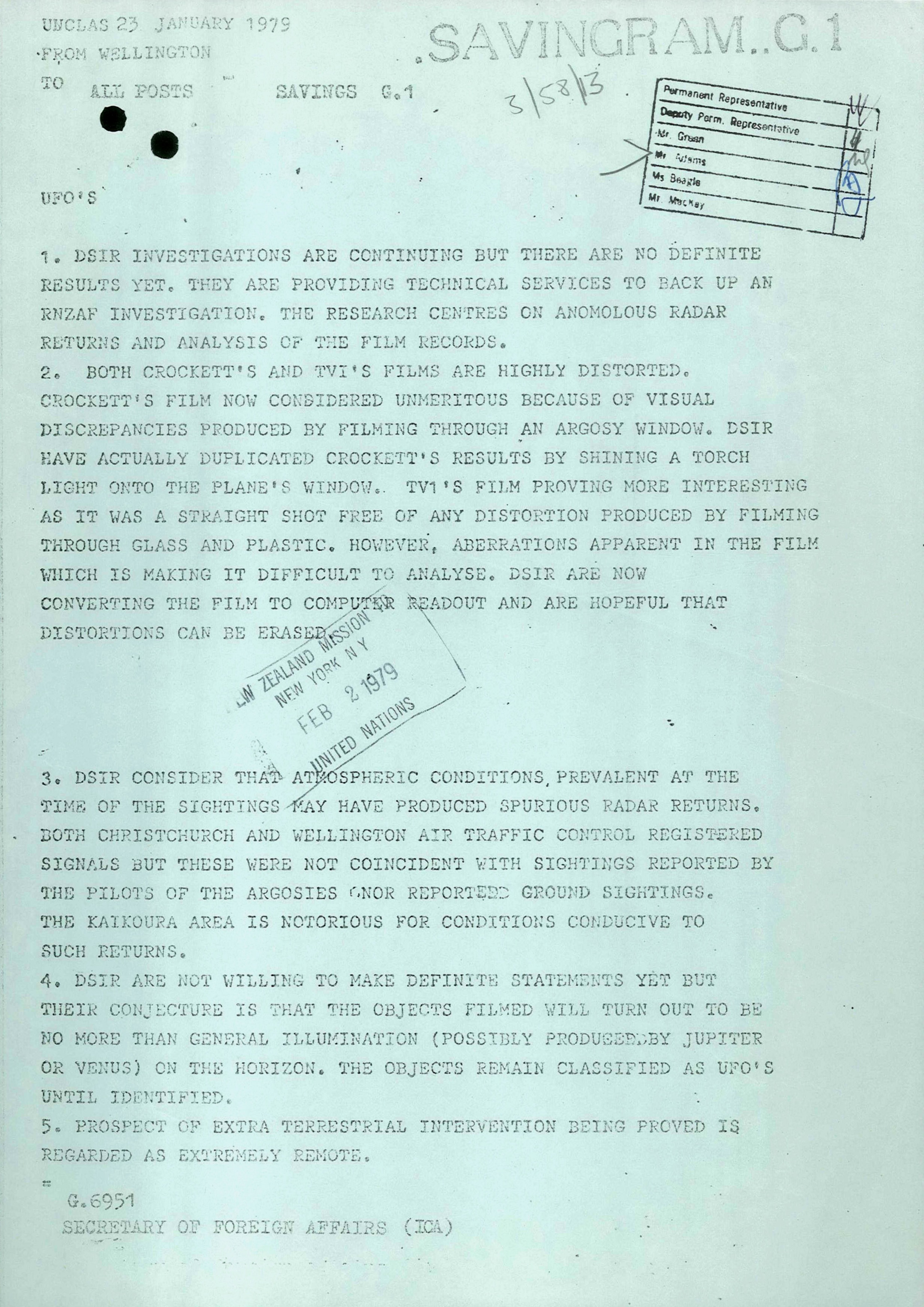
Document from the New Zealand Permanent Mission to the United Nations relating to the Kaikoura Lights (1979)

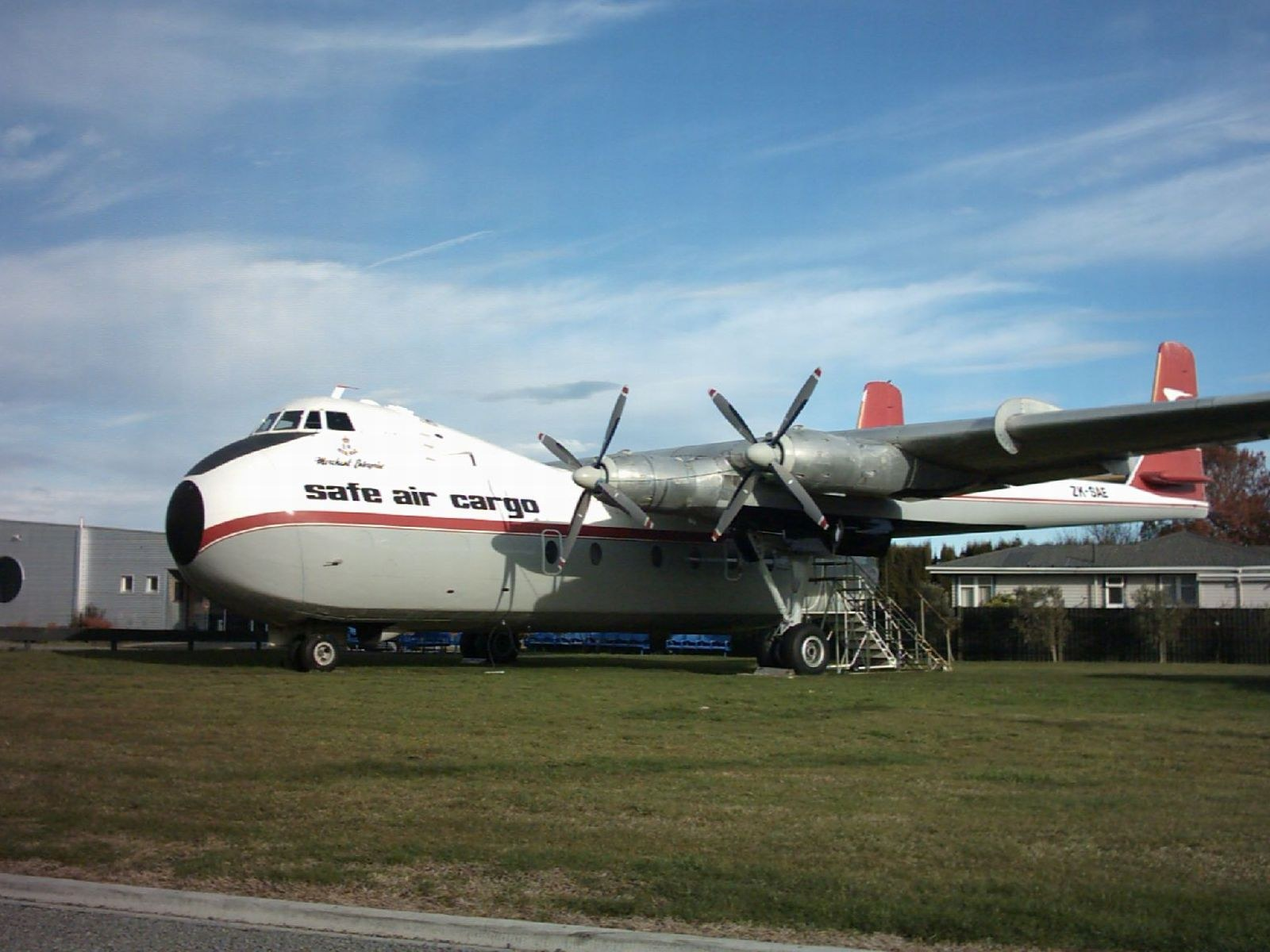
The Argosy plane that was involved in the 30–31 December 1978 incident.

The Kaikōura lights is a name given by the New Zealand media to a series of UFO sightings that occurred in December 1978 in the skies above the Kaikōura mountain ranges (Note: At that time, the mountain range was spelled "Kaikoura", without a macron, so contemporary references speak about the "Kaikoura lights") in the northeast of New Zealand's South Island.

== 21 December 1978 ==
The first sightings were made on 21 December when Vern Powell and Ian Pirie, pilots of a Safe Air Ltd cargo aircraft, observed a series of strange lights around their Armstrong Whitworth AW.660 Argosy while flying from Blenheim to Christchurch. These objects were also tracked on radar by air traffic control at Wellington Airport. Residents of the Clarence Bridge and Kekerungu areas described seeing strange lights around the same time but reportedly did not think much about them.

== 30–31 December 1978 ==
Late on 30 December 1978, a television crew organised by Melbourne's Channel 0 boarded a Safe Air plane that was making a newspaper run between midnight and 1:00 am from Wellington to Christchurch, with the intention of recording background film for a network show about the sightings of 21 December. The group consisted of Melbourne-based television reporter Quentin Fogarty (who had been holidaying in New Zealand), freelance cameraman David Crockett from Wellington, Crockett's wife Ngaire who operated a tape recorder, and the two Safe Air pilots, Bill Startup and Bob Guard. While the Crocketts and Fogarty were filming a piece to camera, Startup shouted at them to come up to the flight deck as the pilots had seen strange lights. For many minutes at a time on the flight to Christchurch, unidentified lights were observed by the five people on the flight deck. The lights were filmed in colour on 16 mm film by the television crew. The Safe Air pilot, Bill Startup, reported that what was described as "a huge, bright white light with a red tinge to it" seemed to track his plane, moving above, below, and in front of it. David Crockett shot film showing objects apparently tracking the plane.

After delivering its load of newspapers to Christchurch, the cargo plane then took off again for Blenheim at 2:16 am with Fogarty and David Crockett still on board. Ngaire Crockett opted to stay in Christchurch because she was frightened, so her place was taken by Dennis Grant. Grant was a Christchurch-based TV1 journalist that Fogarty had been staying with while on holiday. The night was very dark with low and scattered cloud. When the aircraft reached about 2,000 ft (610 m), it encountered a line of five small bright lights and what appeared to be a large lighted orb, which fell into station off the wing tip and tracked along with the aircraft for almost a quarter of an hour while being filmed, watched, and described on a tape recording made by the TV film crew. Fogarty can be heard on the recording saying "let's hope they're friendly". The flight radar, operating in ground-mapping mode, could only detect objects below the aircraft, and seemed to show a large object that matched the position of the light. After landing at Woodbourne Airport at Blenheim around 3:00 am on 31 December, Fogarty interviewed the pilots then returned to Melbourne where the footage aired on prime-time news that night and was later shown on news networks around the world.

A single frame from the Channel 0 footage

Astronomers suggested that the lights recorded on the film looked like Jupiter or Mars, though they admitted that the planets would not show up on radar. Another suggestion astronomers made was that the lights could be ball lightning or meteorites. British astronomer Patrick Moore thought the lights were of terrestrial origin, perhaps a reflection, a balloon, or an aircraft. Critics questioned the quality of the on-board radar, and ground-based crew said radar echoes were relatively common. The lights were not perceived by Christchurch radar, but air traffic control at Wellington had picked up "scores" of unidentified objects on radar a few hours before the flight on Saturday night. Meteorologists suggested the weather conditions were conducive to bending a radar signal, and to distorting light from the ground. There was a suggestion that the focusing ring of the 16 mm camera was faulty, turning a point of light into a blob that appeared to hover and distorting size and distance.

=== Investigation ===
Channel 0 producer Leonard Lee took the 31 December footage of the lights to optical physicist Bruce Maccabee in the United States. Maccabee worked for the US Naval Surface Weapons Center in Maryland and specialised in laser technology. Maccabee also flew to New Zealand and Melbourne to interview witnesses. He calculated that the object was extremely bright and about 20 metres (66 ft) or more in diameter, making it unlikely to be plasma or ball lightning.

The DSIR disputed his calculations, stating that the lights were most likely to be from a fleet of stationary squid fishing boats in the sea below the aircraft. Maccabee disagreed with the DSIR, claiming there was no evidence that squid boats were in the area (although other sources contradict this), and concluded that the event involved "unknown objects or phenomena fitting the definition of UFOs". Although Maccabee had access to the Channel 0 footage, DSIR scientist BIll Ireland has claimed it was not made available to DSIR scientists to study. This contradicts a report of a DSIR briefing to the United Nations in January 1979, where the DSIR stated (presumably after study of the film) that:

- "Both Crockett's and TV1's films are highly distorted"
- "Crockett's film now considered unmeritous because of visual discrepancies produced by filming through an argosy window. DSIR have actually duplicated Crockett's results by shining a torch light onto the plane's window"
- "TV1's film proving more interesting as it was a straight shot free of any distortion produced by filming through glass and plastic"
- "However, aberrations are apparent in the film which is making it difficult to analyse. DSIR are now converting the film to computer readout and are hopeful that distortions can be erased."

After the sightings, the Royal New Zealand Air Force, the police, and the Carter Observatory in Wellington cooperated in an investigation, the results of which were lodged in the National Archives in Wellington. The New Zealand Ministry of Defence attributed the sightings to lights from squid boats reflected off clouds, unburnt meteors, or lights from the planet Venus or trains and cars.

A 1987 article in the Journal of Scientific Exploration ( a parapsychology publication) found that the sightings were "unique among civilian UFO reports because there is a large amount of documentary evidence which includes the recollections of seven witnesses, two tape recordings made during the sightings, the detection of some unusual ground and airplane radar targets, and a 16mm color movie made with a professional camera".

=== Legacy ===
Fogarty and Startup later wrote books about the incident of 30–31 December 1978. Guard later stated that he didn't know what the objects were, but he didn't believe in UFOs. He said that pilots see a lot of unidentified things, but he wouldn't report such an incident in the future because "it's not worth the hassle". David Crockett made a documentary and gave lectures about the sighting.

Blenheim filmmaker Paul Davidson bought the Safe Air Argosy in 1990 when it was about to be scrapped. He made a documentary in 2008, focussing on the stories of those on board the Argosy rather than the debate about UFOs. For some years, he ran UFO-themed experiences where visitors could sit in Captain Startup's seat and learn about the incident.

== Final analysis ==
In 2000, former Department of Scientific and Industrial Research (DSIR) scientist William Ireland published a retrospective analysis of the Kaikōura lights in the journal of the New Zealand Skeptics. Drawing on footage that appeared in the 1982 BBC documentary The Case of the UFOs, Ireland argued that the images filmed from the Safe Air Argosy were consistent with lights from squid fishing vessels operating at sea rather than unidentified aerial objects.

Ireland re-examined frames from the 16 mm film recorded by David Crockett (as published by the BBC), noting that the footage had been captured using two zoom lenses (16–100 mm and 80–240 mm). He argued that earlier calculations by physicist Bruce Maccabee had assumed an incorrect focal length, which led to overestimates of the apparent size and brightness of the filmed object. According to Ireland, some frames show multiple parallel rows of discrete lights rather than a single luminous source.

From measurements of the images and assumptions about viewing geometry, Ireland estimated the lights were about 6 kilometres (3.7 mi) from the aircraft and arranged in rows roughly matching the lighting rigs used on squid fishing boats. Such vessels typically carried two rows of high-powered lamps suspended above the deck to attract squid at night. The spacing, number of lights, and estimated dimensions derived from the film were, in his view, closely consistent with vessels about 20–25 metres (66–82 ft) long equipped with rows of lamps spaced roughly 2–3 metres (6 ft 7 in – 9 ft 10 in) apart.

Ireland concluded that the filmed lights were most likely a small group of squid boats operating on the sea surface and viewed from the aircraft under clear night conditions. On this interpretation, the apparent motion and brightness of the lights were the result of perspective, zoom lens effects, and the aircraft's movement relative to the boats.

The footage analysed by Ireland is publicly available in the 1982 BBC Horizon documentary The Case of the UFOs. The programme has been archived online, and frames corresponding to those reproduced in Ireland's article—such as the image similar to his Figure 2—can be seen in the sequence beginning at frame number 133,786, approximately 37 minutes and 12 seconds into the BBC film. Ireland noted that several frames in this telephoto sequence show multiple parallel rows of individual lights, consistent with the lighting rigs used on squid fishing vessels.

== Other sightings ==
A spate of sightings followed the initial reports, and an Air Force Skyhawk was put on stand-by to investigate any positive sightings. A TV1 film crew captured an image of a UFO near Waiau Toa / Clarence River on 3 January 1979. Lights have appeared intermittently since the initial December 1978 sightings, with the most recent sighting being reported in 2015.

== See also ==
- List of reported UFO sightings
- UFO sightings in New Zealand
