= Iran Standard Time =

Identifier for a time offset from UTC of +03:30

Time in the Middle East: Offset / Zone(s); UTC+2 / Eastern European Time; Israel Standard Time; Palestine Standard Time; UTC+3 / Eastern European Summer Time; Israel Summer Time; Palestine Summer Time; UTC+3 / Arabia Standard Time; Turkey Time; UTC+3:30 / Iran Standard Time; UTC+4 / Gulf Standard Time; Standard time observed all year Daylight saving time observed

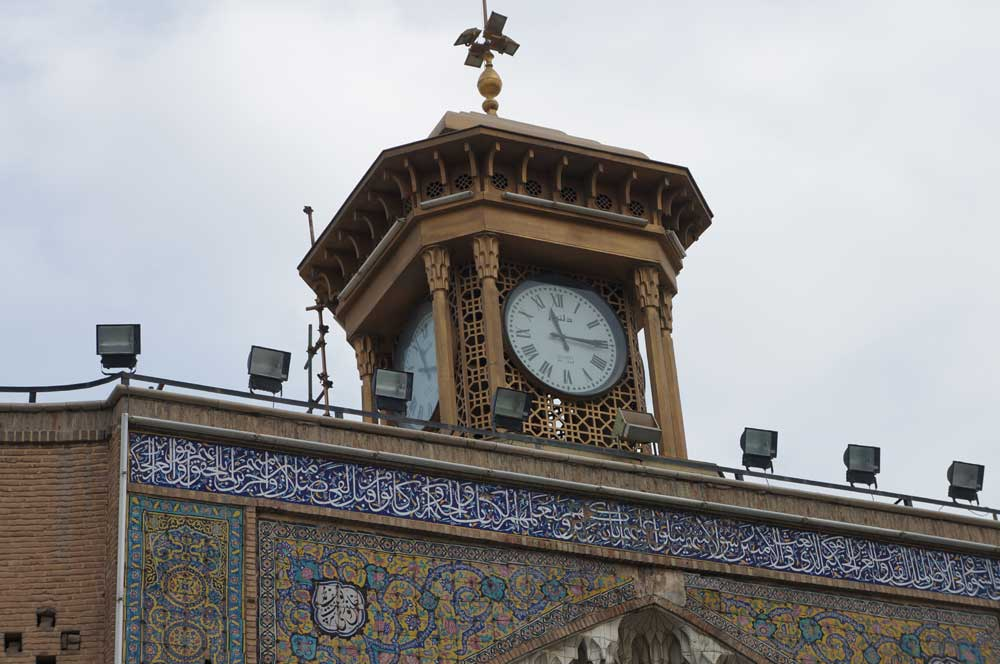
Public clock in Shahr-e Ray, 2014

Iran Standard Time (IRST) or Iran Time (IT) is the time zone used in Iran. Iran uses a UTC offset UTC+03:30. IRST is defined by the 52.5 degrees east meridian, the same meridian which defines the Iranian calendar and is the official meridian of Iran.

Between 2005 and 2008, by decree of President Mahmoud Ahmadinejad, Iran did not observe daylight saving time (DST) (called Iran Daylight Time or IRDT). It was reintroduced from 21 March 2008. On 21 September 2022, Iran abolished DST for the second time and now observes standard time year-round.

== Daylight Saving Time transitions ==
The dates of DST transitions in Iran were based on the Solar Hijri calendar, the official calendar of Iran, which is in turn based on the March equinox (Nowruz) as determined by astronomical calculation at the meridian for Iran Standard Time (52.5°E or GMT+3.5h). This resulted in the unique situation wherein the dates of DST transitions did not fall on the same weekday each year as they do in most other countries.

DST started in Iran at 24:00 on 1 Farvardin, which corresponds to either 20 or 21 March in the Gregorian calendar, depending on the precise timing of the equinox. (This is equivalent to 00:00 on 2 Farvardin, either 21 or 22 March.) Clocks moved forward at that time to 01:00 on 2 Farvardin (21 or 22 March). This spring change took place at the end of the day of Nowruz, which is the Iranian New Year's Day and the most important festival in Iranian culture.

DST likewise ended in Iran at 24:00 on 30 Shahrivar, which corresponds to either 20 or 21 September. (Equivalently, at 00:00 on 31 Shahrivar, either 21 or 22 September). Clocks moved backward to 23:00 on 30 Shahrivar (20 or 21 September).

== Time zone changes ==
Period in use	Time offset from GMT	Name of time
before 1945	UTC+03:25:44	Tehran Mean Time (TMT)
1946 – 1977	UTC+03:30	Iran Standard Time (IRST)
1977 – 1978	UTC+04:00; UTC+05:00	Iran Standard Time (IRST); Iran Daylight Time (IRDT)
1979 – 1980	UTC+03:30; UTC+04:30	Iran Standard Time (IRST); Iran Daylight Time (IRDT)
1981 – 1990	UTC+03:30	Iran Standard Time (IRST)
1991 – 2005	UTC+03:30; UTC+04:30	Iran Standard Time (IRST); Iran Daylight Time (IRDT)
2006 – 2007	UTC+03:30	Iran Standard Time (IRST)
2008 – 2022	UTC+03:30; UTC+04:30	Iran Standard Time (IRST); Iran Daylight Time (IRDT)
2022 – present	UTC+03:30	Iran Standard Time (IRST)

== See also ==
- Iranian calendars
