= Thomas King (astronomer) =

New Zealand astronomer

Thomas King (1858 – 16 March 1916) was a New Zealand astronomer.

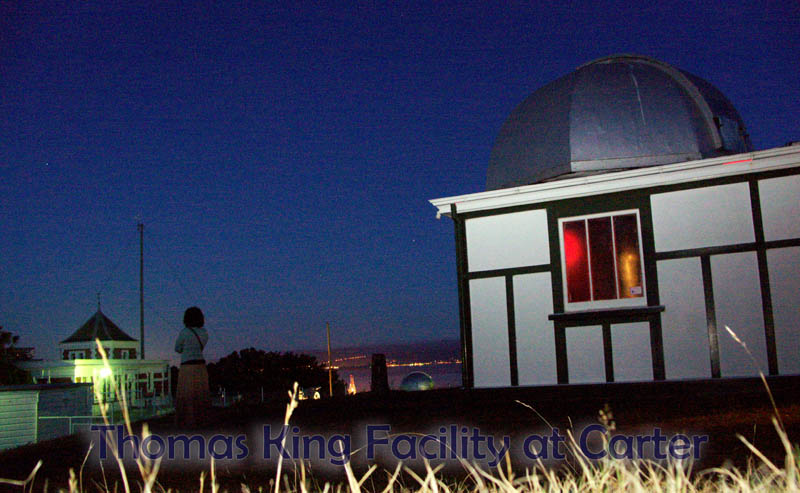
Thomas King Observatory at Carter – National Observatory of New Zealand

== Early life ==
King was born in Glasgow, Scotland and came to Auckland with his parents as an infant. He was educated at Auckland Grammar School. He later received private tuition in Wellington.

== Carter Observatory ==
Thomas King took over the charge of the Carter Observatory in 1887 from the Reverend Arthur Stock, vicar of St Peters (former astronomer in charge of the Wellington time-ball station on Lambton House Quay).

King has an astronomical observatory facility named after him at Carter Observatory in Wellington, New Zealand.

== Thomas King Observatory ==
The Thomas King Observatory (Māori: Ataira Te Ao Nui) in Wellington, near the Carter Observatory, is now in constant use following the restoration of it and its telescope.

In May 2001 Gordon Hudson began the refurbishment of the 5 inch Grubb Telescope housed in the Thomas King Observatory. This telescope was made in 1882 by Grubb in Dublin and over its 120 years it is in remarkably good condition.

== Death ==
King died on 16 March 1916 in Wellington.

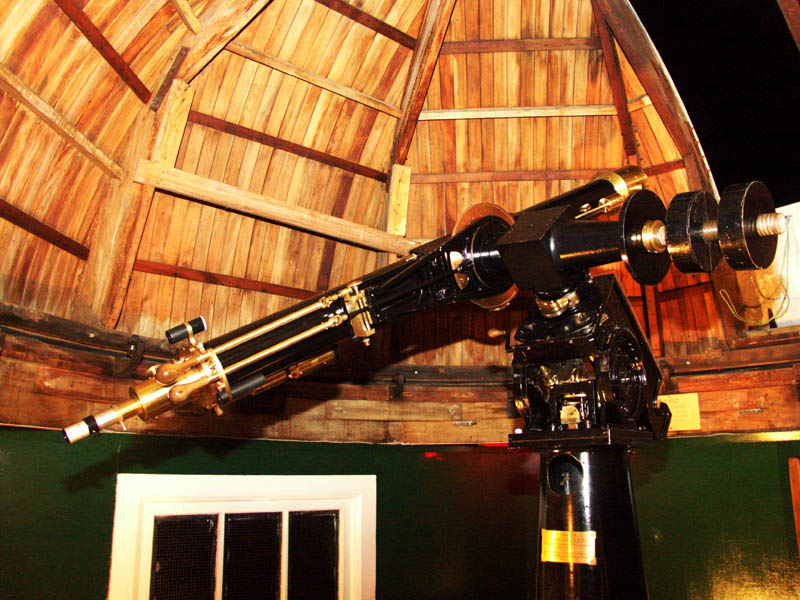
Thomas King Observatory at Carter – National Observatory of New Zealand

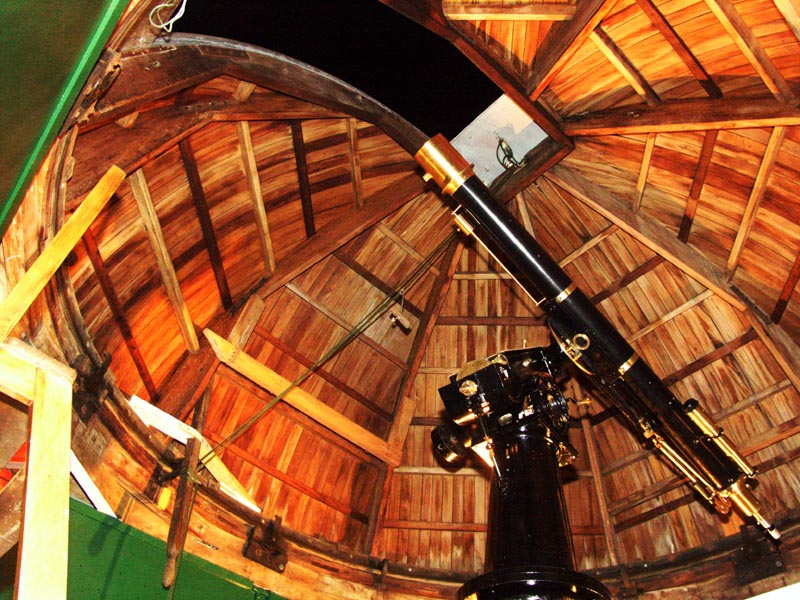
Thomas King Observatory at Carter – National Observatory of New Zealand

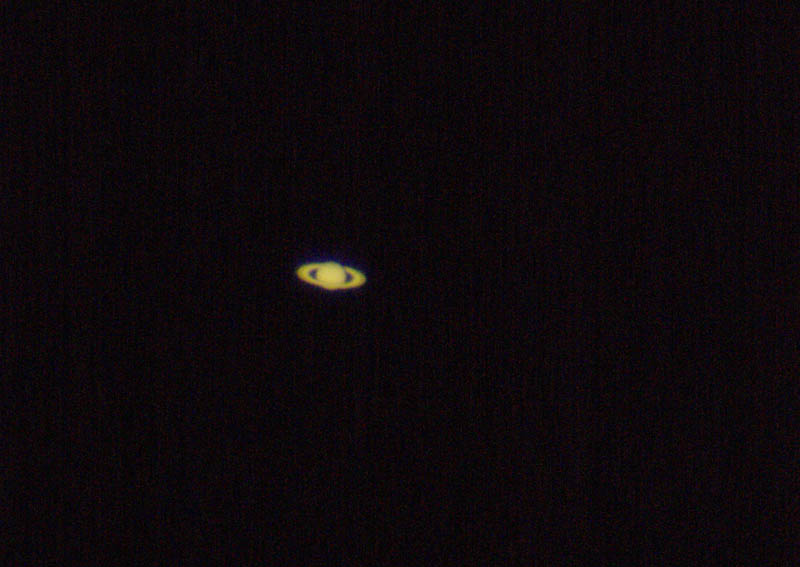
Saturn image taken at the Thomas King Observatory February 2006
