= Colonial Time Service Observatory =

Astronomical observatory in New Zealand

Coordinates: 41.279511°S 174.771792°E

The Colonial Time Service Observatory was an observatory situated on the edge of the Bolton Street Cemetery in Wellington, New Zealand. It was built in 1869 to replace the Provincial Observatory, the line of sight of the Provincial Observatory had been obstructed by the building of a new telegraph office.

The observatory's main function was to determine an exact time for standard New Zealand time by measuring the transit of stars.

It was demolished in 1906 to allow the Prime Minister Richard Seddon to be buried on the site. It was replaced by the Dominion Observatory in 1907.
