= Standard time =

Synchronisation of clocks within a geographical region

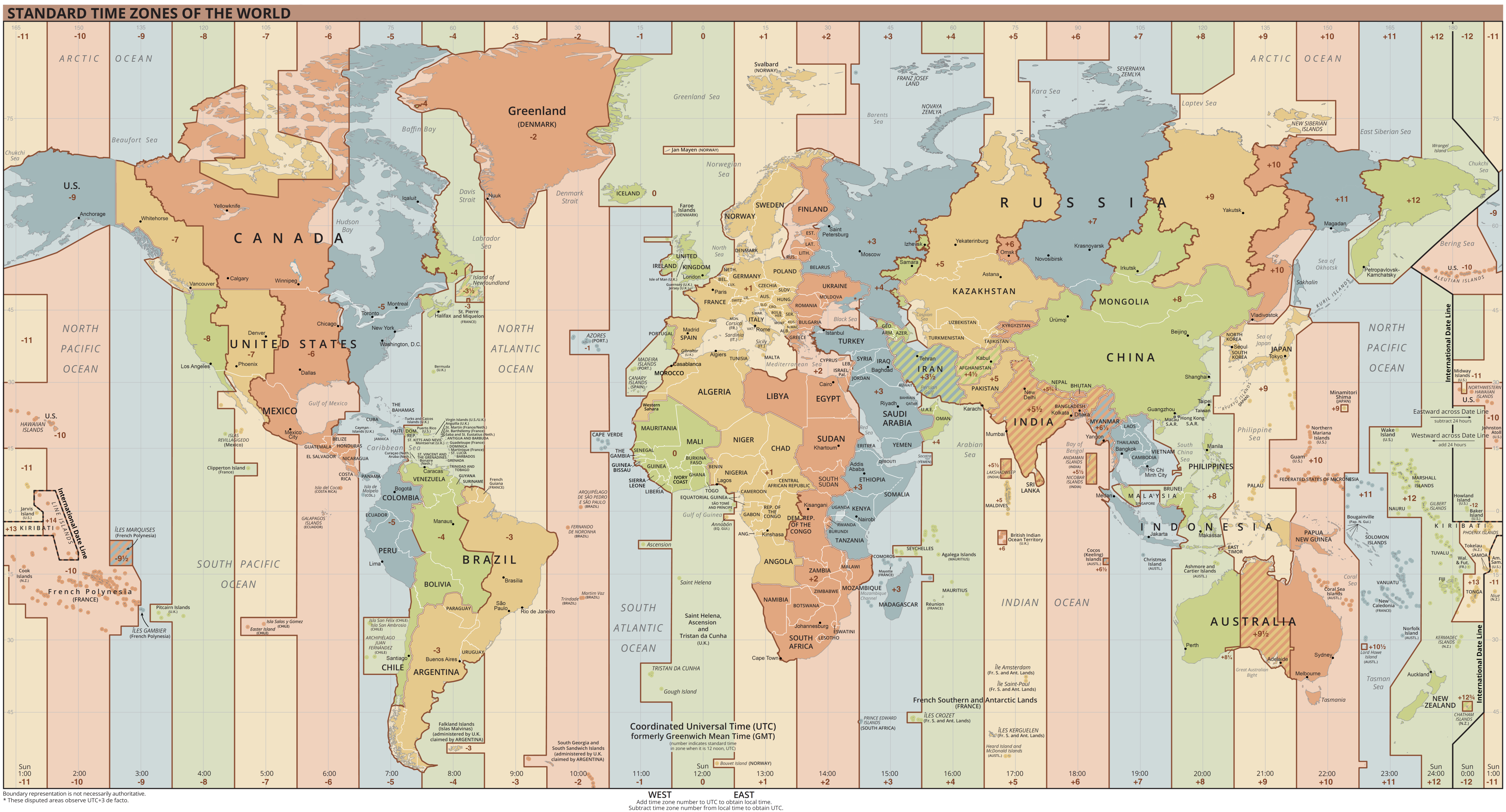
Worldwide time zones at present

Standard time is the synchronisation of clocks within a geographical region to a single time standard, rather than different localities in the region using their own local mean time. The term is also used to contrast with daylight saving time, a period of the year when clocks are shifted ahead one hour, supposedly to make better use of daily sunlight from spring to fall. Applied globally in the 20th century, the geographical regions became time zones. The standard time in each time zone has come to be defined as an offset from Universal Time. A further offset is applied for part of the year in regions with daylight saving time. Generally, standard time agrees with the local mean time at some meridian that passes through the region, often near the centre of the region. Historically, standard time was established during the 19th century to aid weather forecasting and train travel.

The adoption of standard time, because of the inseparable correspondence between longitude and time, solidified the concept of halving the globe into the Eastern Hemisphere and the Western Hemisphere, with one Prime Meridian replacing the various prime meridians that had previously been used.

== History of standard time ==
The introduction of scheduled steamships and trains in the 19th century made time standardisation desirable in the industrialised world.

=== Great Britain ===
Through the mid-19th century, cities in Great Britain maintained their own local time. As railroads were introduced, timetables listed multiple arrival and departure times based on these local time zones. In September 1847, the Railway Clearing House recommended that all railway companies adopt Greenwich Mean Time (GMT) at their stations; GMT was subsequently adopted by all British railways by the end of that year. GMT was also given the name railway time, reflecting the important role the railway companies played in bringing it about. The vast majority of Great Britain's public clocks were standardised to GMT by 1855, and GMT became the legal standard time in 1880.

=== North America ===
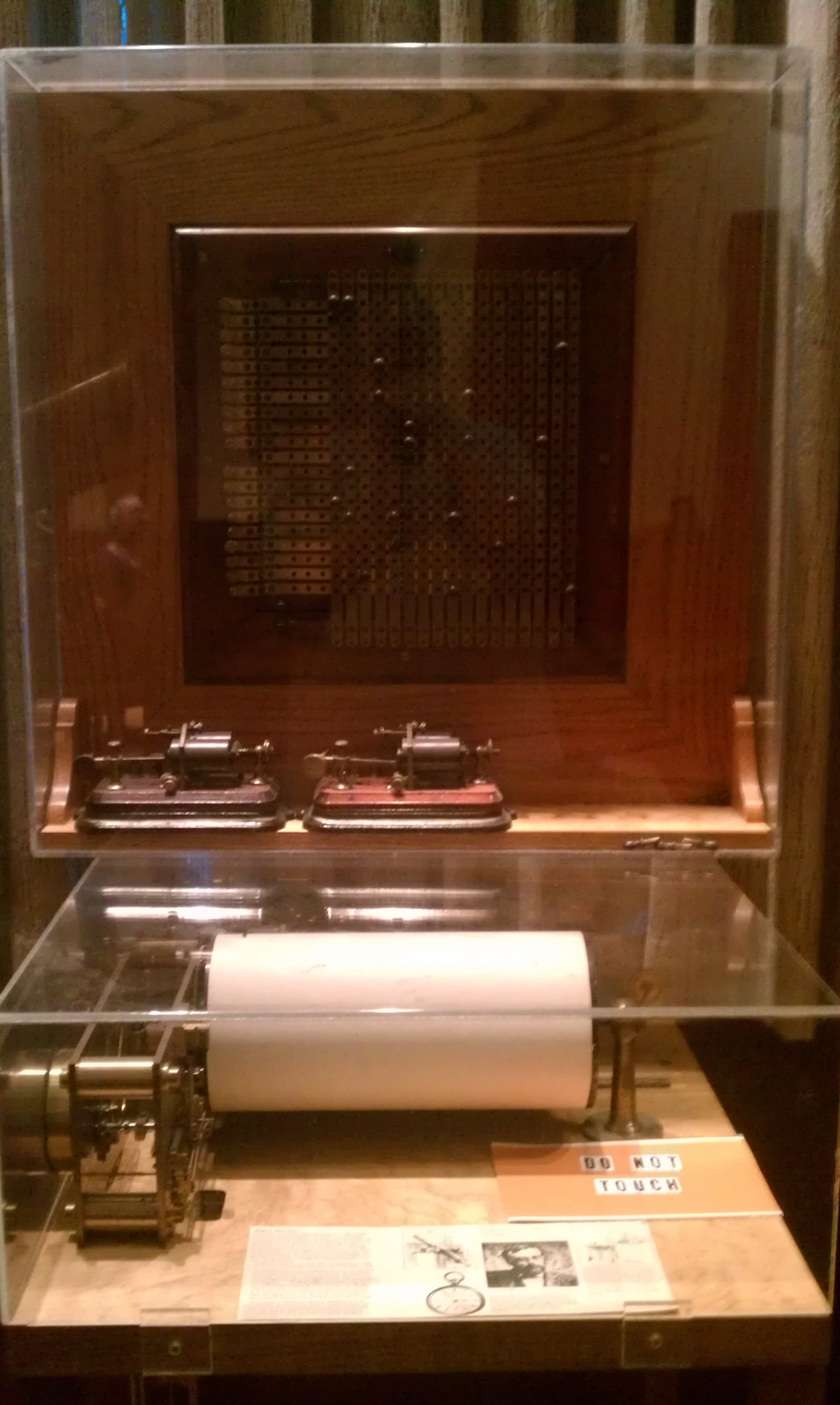
Telegraphic equipment used to transmit standard time from the Allegheny Observatory

Until 1883, each United States railroad chose its own time standards. The Pennsylvania Railroad used the "Allegheny Time" system, an astronomical timekeeping service which had been developed by Samuel Pierpont Langley at the University of Pittsburgh's Allegheny Observatory (then known as the Western University of Pennsylvania, located in Pittsburgh, Pennsylvania). Instituted in 1869, the Allegheny Observatory's service is believed to have been the first regular and systematic system of time distribution to railroads and cities as well as the origin of the modern standard time system. By 1870 the Allegheny Time service extended over 2,500 miles with 300 telegraph offices receiving time signals.

However, almost all railroads out of New York ran on New York time, and railroads west from Chicago mostly used Chicago time, but between Chicago and Pittsburgh/Buffalo the norm was Columbus time, even on railroads such as the PFtW&C and LS&MS, which did not run through Columbus. The Santa Fe Railroad used Jefferson City (Missouri) time all the way to its west end at Deming, New Mexico, as did the east–west lines across Texas; Central Pacific and Southern Pacific Railroads used San Francisco time all the way to El Paso. The Northern Pacific Railroad had seven time zones between St. Paul and the 1883 west end of the railroad at Wallula Jct; the Union Pacific Railway was at the other extreme, with only two time zones between Omaha and Ogden.

In 1870, Charles F. Dowd proposed four time zones based on the meridian through Washington, DC, for North American railroads. In 1872 he revised his proposal to base it on the Greenwich meridian. Sandford Fleming, a Scottish-born Canadian engineer, proposed worldwide Standard Time at a meeting of the Royal Canadian Institute on February 8, 1879. Cleveland Abbe advocated standard time to better coordinate international weather observations and resultant weather forecasts, which had been coordinated using local solar time. In 1879 he recommended four time zones across the contiguous United States, based upon Greenwich Mean Time. The General Time Convention (renamed the American Railway Association in 1891), an organisation of US railroads charged with coordinating schedules and operating standards, became increasingly concerned that if the US government adopted a standard time scheme it would be disadvantageous to its member railroads. William F. Allen, the Convention secretary, argued that North American railroads should adopt a five-zone standard, similar to the one in use today, to avoid government action. On October 11, 1883, the heads of the major railroads met in Chicago at the Grand Pacific Hotel and agreed to adopt Allen's proposed system.

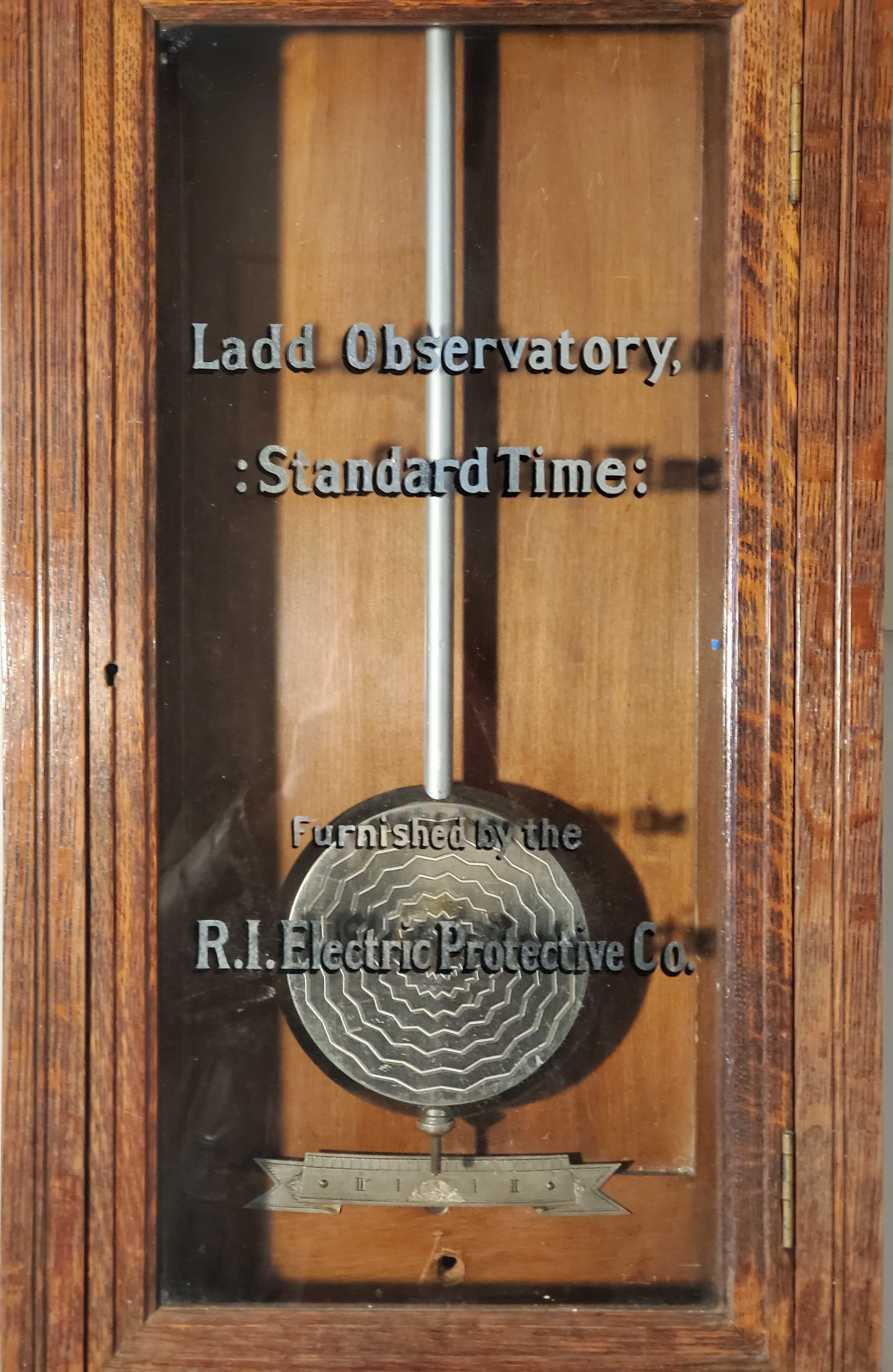
A clock that was adjusted to Eastern Standard Time. It was made in the mid-1890s.

The members agreed that on Sunday, November 18, 1883, all United States and Canadian railroads would readjust their clocks and watches to reflect the new five-zone system on a telegraph signal from the Allegheny Observatory in Pittsburgh at exactly noon on the 90th meridian. Although most railroads adopted the new system as scheduled, some did so early on October 7 and others late on December 2. The Intercolonial Railway serving the Canadian maritime provinces of New Brunswick and Nova Scotia just east of Maine decided not to adopt Intercolonial Time based on the 60th meridian west of Greenwich, instead adopting Eastern Time, so only four time zones were actually adopted by American and Canadian railroads in 1883. Major American observatories, including the Allegheny Observatory, the United States Naval Observatory, the Harvard College Observatory, and the Yale University Observatory, agreed to provide telegraphic time signals at noon Eastern Time.

Standard time was not enacted into US law until the 1918 Standard Time Act established standard time in time zones; the law also instituted daylight saving time (DST). The daylight saving time portion of the law was repealed in 1919 over a presidential veto, but was re-established nationally during World War II. In 2007 the US enacted a federal law formalising the use of Coordinated Universal Time as the basis of standard time, and the role of the Secretary of Commerce (effectively, the National Institute of Standards and Technology) and the Secretary of the Navy (effectively, the US Naval Observatory) in interpreting standard time.

In 1999, standard time was inducted into the North America Railway Hall of Fame in the category "National: Technical Innovations."

The Dominion of Newfoundland, whose capital St. John's falls almost exactly midway between the meridians anchoring the Atlantic Time Zone and the Greenland Time Zone, voted in 1935 to create a half-hour offset time zone known as the Newfoundland Time Zone, at three and a half hours behind Greenwich time.

=== The Netherlands ===
In the Netherlands, introduction of the railways made it desirable to create a standard time. On 1 May 1909, Amsterdam Time or Dutch Time was introduced. Before that, time was measured in different cities; in the east of the country, this was a few minutes earlier than in the west. After that, all parts of the country had the same local time: that of the Wester Tower in Amsterdam (Westertoren/4°53'01.95" E). This time was indicated as GMT +0h 19m 32.13s until 17 March 1937, after which it was simplified to GMT+0h20m. This time zone was also known as the Loenen time or Gorinchem time, as this was the exact time in both Loenen and Gorinchem. At noon in Amsterdam, it was 11:40 in London and 12:40 in Berlin.

The shift to the current Central European Time zone took place on 16 May 1940. The German occupiers ordered the clock to be moved an hour and forty minutes forward. This time was kept in summer and winter throughout 1941 and 1942. It was only in November 1942 that a different Winter time was introduced, and the time was adjusted one hour backwards. This lasted for only three years; after the liberation of the Netherlands in 1945, daylight savings time was abolished for over thirty years, so during those years, standard time was 40 minutes ahead of the original Amsterdam Time. As of 2017, the Netherlands is in line with Central European Time (GMT+1 in the winter, GMT+2 in the summer, which is significantly different from Amsterdam Time).

=== New Zealand ===
In September 1868, New Zealand was the first country in the world to establish a nationwide standard time.

A telegraph cable between New Zealand's two main islands became the instigating factor for the establishment of "New Zealand time". In 1868, the Telegraph Department adopted "Wellington time" as the standard time across all their offices so that opening and closing times could be synchronised. The Post Office, which usually shared the same building, followed suit. However, protests that time was being dictated by one government department led to a resolution in parliament to establish a standard time for the whole country. The director of the Geological Survey, James Hector, selected New Zealand time to be at the meridian 172°30′E. This was very close to the country's mean longitude and exactly 11.5 hours in advance of Greenwich Mean Time. It came into effect on 2 November 1868.

For over fifty years, the Colonial Time Service Observatory in Wellington determined the correct time each morning. At 9 a.m. each day, it was transmitted by Morse code to post offices and railway stations around the country. In 1920, radio time signals began broadcasting, greatly increasing the accuracy of the time nationwide.

== See also ==
- International Meridian Conference of 1884
- Mecca Time
- Time standard
- Universal Time
