= Boller and Chivens =

American telescope manufacturer

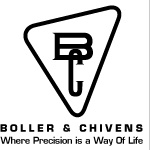
- Industry: Astronomical telescopes, cameras and other precision instruments
- Founded: c. 1946
- Founder: Harry B. Boller and Clyde C. Chivens
- Headquarters: South Pasadena, California, United States
- Website: bollerandchivens.com (archival site)

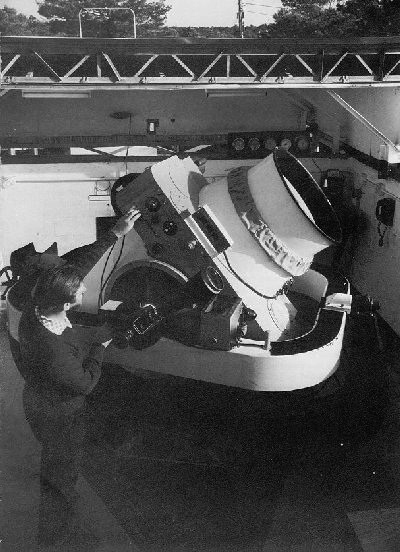
The Baker-Nunn satellite tracking camera.

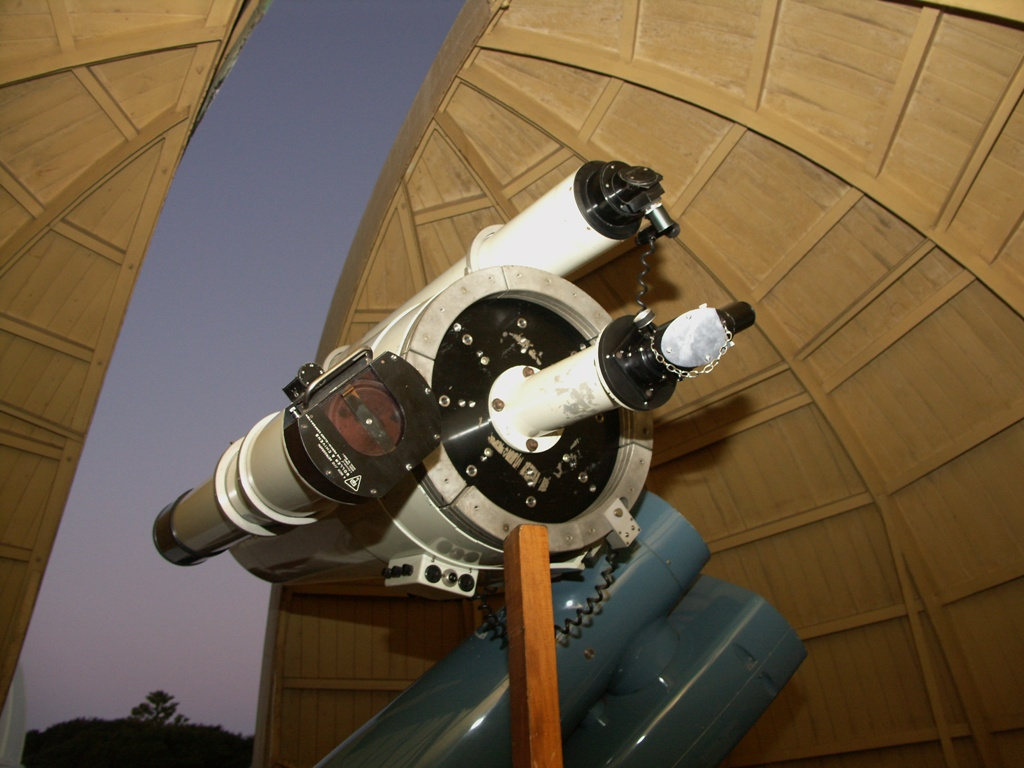
The Ruth Crisp Telescope at the Carter Observatory in Wellington, New Zealand, a 41-cm (16-inch) Cassegrain reflector built by Boller and Chivens.

Boller and Chivens was an American manufacturer of high-quality telescopes and spectrographs headquartered in South Pasadena, California.

== History ==
Founded about 1946 by Harry Berthold Boller (1915-1997) and Clyde Cuthbertson Chivens (1915-2008). the company was acquired in 1965 by Perkin-Elmer.

In the 1950s, Boller and Chivens collaborated with Perkin-Elmer to develop and manufacture the large-aperture Baker-Nunn satellite tracking camera for the United States Vanguard space satellite program.

== In culture ==
A 41-cm (16-inch) Boller and Chivens Cassegrain reflector originally housed at the Harvard-Smithsonian Oak Ridge Observatory in Massachusetts is available for public use at the National Air and Space Museum's Public Observatory Project on the National Mall in Washington, D.C.
