= Gifford Observatory =

Astronomical observatory in New Zealand

Coordinates: 41°18′18″S 174°46′59″E

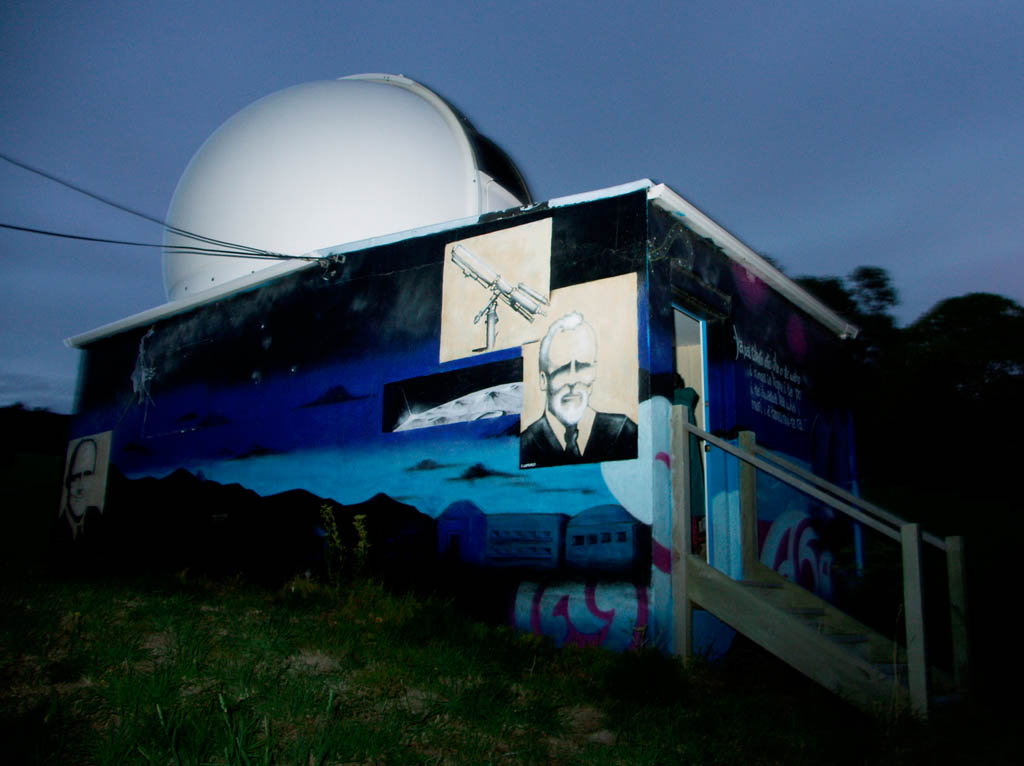
Observatory Building entrance and mural showing Charles Gifford and telescope

The Gifford Observatory is an astronomical observation facility located in the suburb of Mount Victoria, Wellington, New Zealand. Operated by the Gifford Observatory Trust with the intent of making it available for use to Wellington school children, it is primarily used by secondary school students, and members of the Wellington Astronomical Society.

== History of the observatory ==
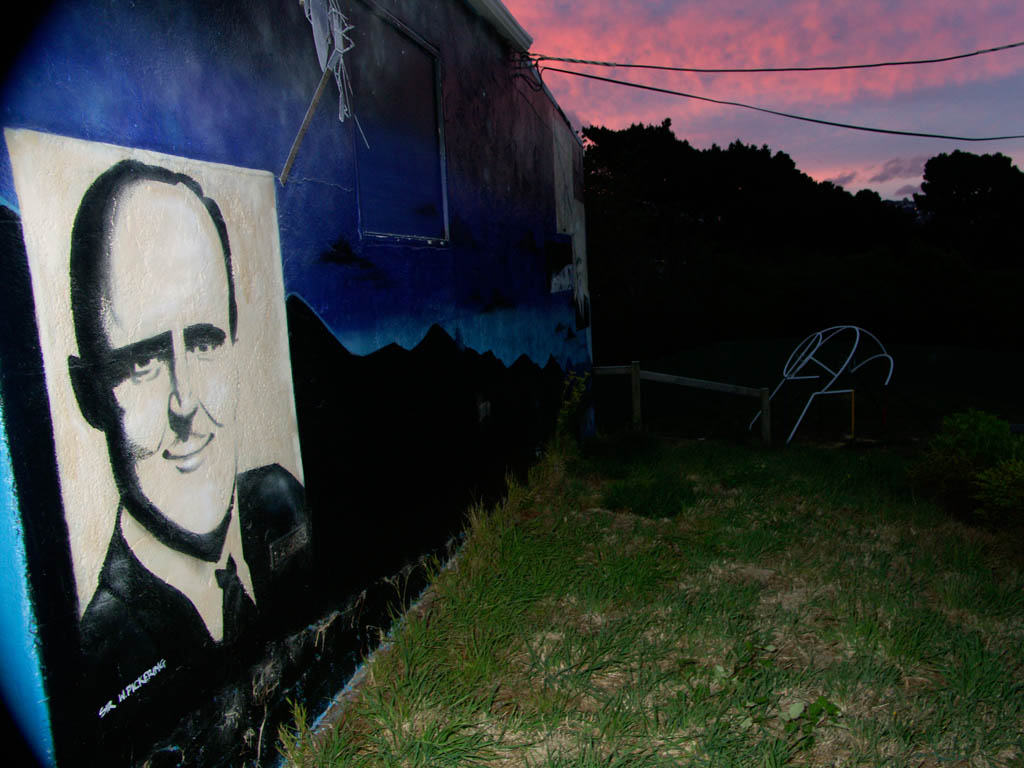
Observatory Mural showing William Pickering

The observatory was first established in 1912 by the efforts of Charles Gifford, a science teacher. The observatory was moved to the current site in 1926, on land that is now occupied in trust by Wellington College and Wellington East Girls' College. The observatory fell into disrepair in the late 1970s due to a momentary lack of time and enthusiasm from staff and students at the school.

A trust was established in 1998 by a small group of interested teachers and amateur astronomers from the Wellington Astronomical Society, with the goal of restoring the observatory to a working state. On March 25, 2002, the observatory was successfully re-opened by William Pickering, who had been a frequent user of the observatory during his school days.

== Equipment ==
Since being moved to its present location in 1924, the observatory has housed a 130 mm Zeiss refracting telescope. The telescope was equipped with a clockwork drive until it was replaced by a motor drive in the mid-1960s.

The telescope was kept in storage during the observatory's disrepair throughout the 1980s and 1990s. It was returned to the observatory following the restoration.

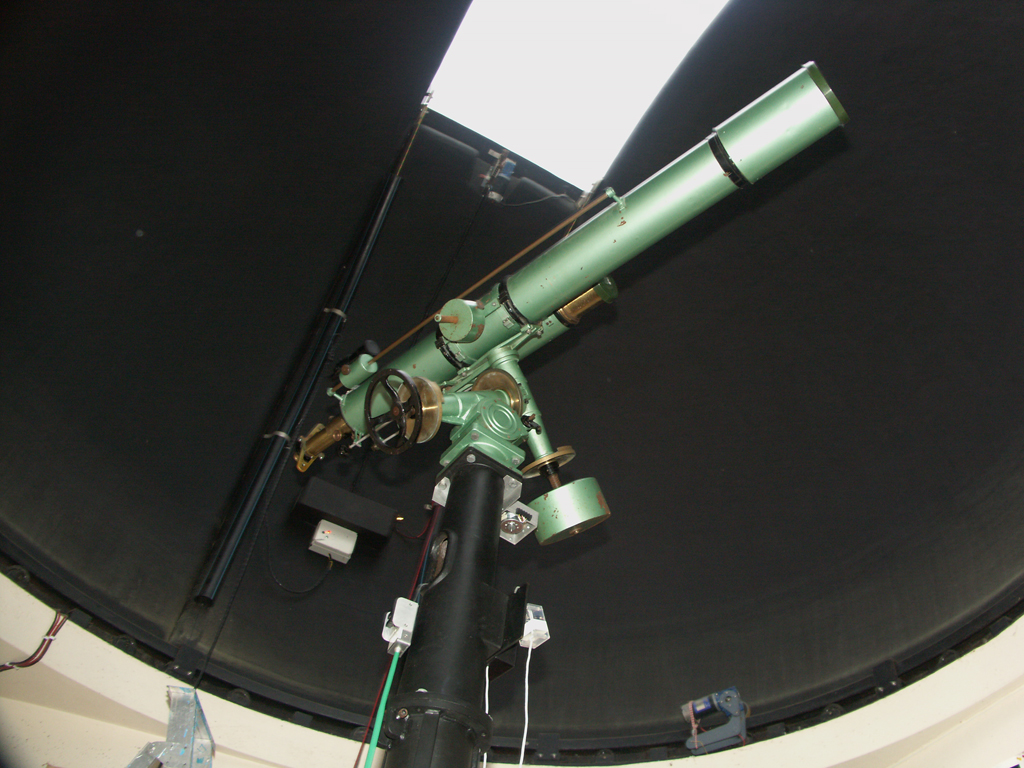
130 mm Zeiss refracting telescope

== See also ==
- Carter Observatory, also located in Wellington.
