= Cherenkov =

Cherenkov (masculine, Russian: Черенков) or Cherenkova (feminine, Russian: Черенкова) is a Russian surname. Notable people with the surname include:

- Andrei Cherenkov (born 1976), Russian football manager and former player
- Fyodor Cherenkov (1959–2014), Soviet and Russian footballer
- Pavel Cherenkov (1904–1990), Soviet physicist

== See also ==
- Cherenkov Array at Themis, an atmospheric Cherenkov imaging telescope
- Cherenkov detector, a particle detector
  - Ring-imaging Cherenkov detector
- Cherenkov luminescence imaging
- Cherenkov radiation, particular occurrence of electromagnetic radiation
- Cherenkov Telescope Array, a multinational worldwide project
- High Altitude Water Cherenkov Experiment
- Imaging Atmospheric Cherenkov Technique
- Radio Ice Cherenkov Experiment
- Track Imaging Cherenkov Experiment
