= Space Place at Carter Observatory =

Historic observatory in Wellington, New Zealand

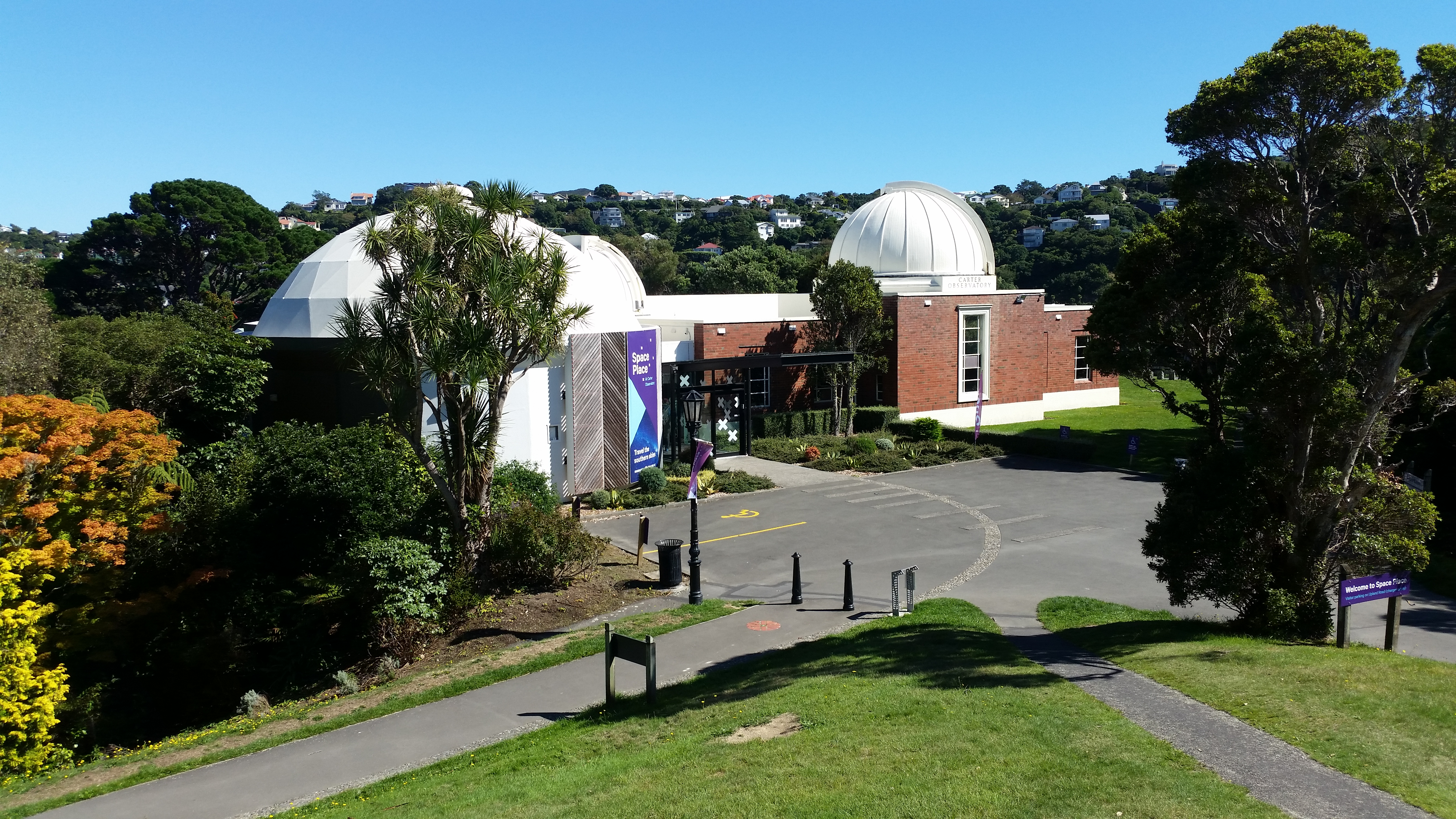
- Space Place at Carter Observatory
- Alternative names: Space Place at Carter Observatory
- Named after: Charles Carter
- Organization: Experience Wellington
- Observatory code: 485
- Location: Wellington, New Zealand
- Coordinates: 41.28437°S 174.76697°E
- Altitude: 117 m (384 ft)
- Established: 1937 - 1941
- Website: www.museumswellington.org.nz/space-place/

Telescopes
- Thomas Cooke telescope: Cooke refractor
- Ruth Crisp telescope: Cassegrain reflector
- Related media on Commons

Heritage New Zealand – Category 2
- Designated: 6-Jun-1984
- Reference no.: 3596

Space Place at Carter Observatory (or simply Space Place) is an observatory in 40 Salamanca Rd, Kelburn, Wellington, New Zealand, located at the top of the Wellington Botanic Garden near the top terminal of Cable Car.

The site was originally home to the Wellington City Observatory (nicknamed "The Tin Shed"), established in 1924. This was demolished and replaced by the Carter Observatory, which officially opened on 20 December 1941. Since renamed the Space Place, it is now managed by Museums Wellington, which is part of Experience Wellington, and is a public museum and planetarium with a focus on space and New Zealand astronomy. The Observatory houses a digital planetarium as well as an historic 9 3/4-inch Cooke refractor telescope, through which evening visitors can observe a variety of Solar System and deep-sky objects. It is listed by Heritage New Zealand as a Category 2 Historic Place.

The observatory also has concession prices for seniors and students, while offering prices specifically catered towards families. Children under the age of 4 enter for free. Bookings are available for school tours and tour groups.The observatory also has donations available in order to support space education more accessible.

== History ==
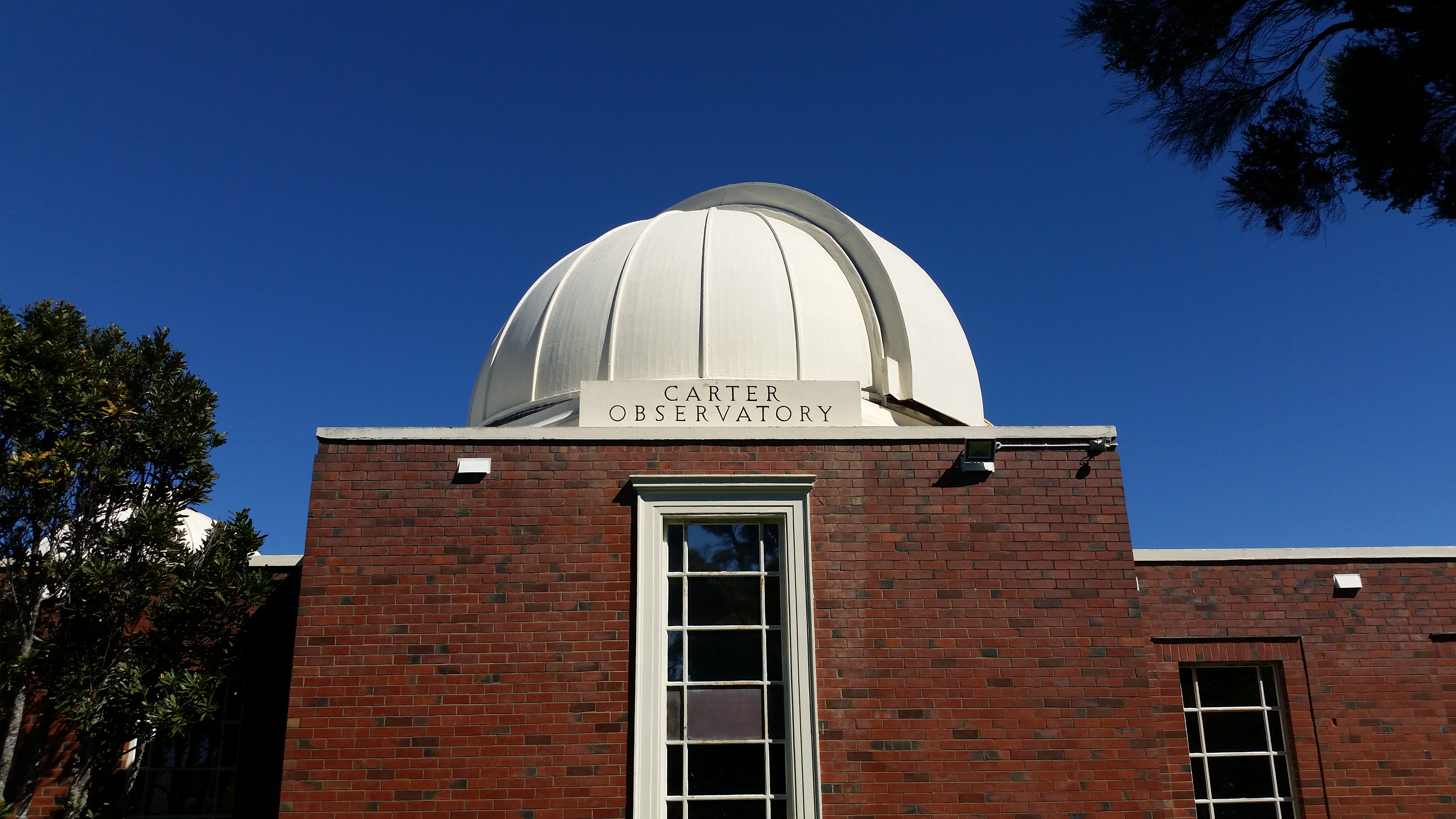
Outside view of the Thomas Cooke telescope dome

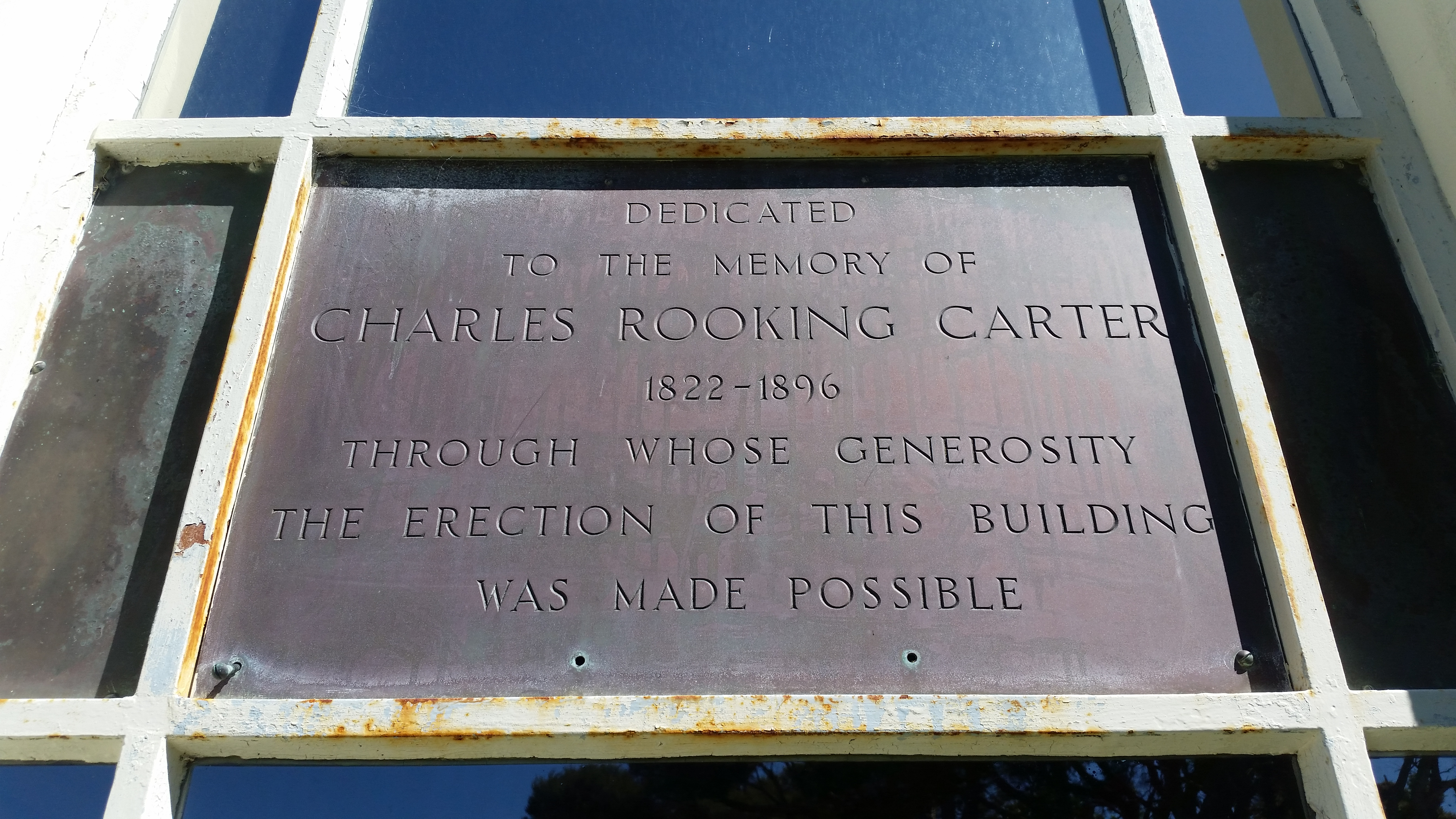
Historic plaque dedicated to Charles Carter

The original name, Carter Observatory, commemorates Charles Carter, who gifted his estate to what later became the Royal Society of New Zealand for the purposes of establishing an astronomical observatory in or near Wellington. Parliament established the Carter Observatory in 1937.

In 1939, following successful fundraising, the Carter Observatory board voted to commission prominent Wellington architects, Gray Young, Morton and Young. The layout was based on the requirements of the board, with the need to house two donated telescopes from the W.C.C. & Victoria University College, specialised equipment such as a spectrohelioscope, darkrooms, and other services of an astronomical research facility. The initial design was approved in June 1939, with plans and specifications completed in May 1940, as site preparation had already begun. Designed with educational and public interest in mind, the largest room in the structure was given to a lecture hall capable of seating 56 people, with the possibility of upgrading to 84 seats.

Construction began shortly after by the Fletcher Construction Company, with an approved tender of £6,467.76

It opened in 1941, following some delays caused by the beginnings of World War II. It is regarded as the fifth observatory in Wellington, and was built on the site of the previous Wellington City Observatory nicknamed "The Tin Shed."

Over the following decades, Carter Observatory became a base for astronomical research in New Zealand. Research began with solar investigations, and when new staff joined during the 1970s it expanded to variable stars, galaxies, comets and asteroids. The Observatory ran formal research programmes and assisted amateur astronomers in performing their own research.

The Carter Observatory became New Zealand's National Observatory in 1977. In 1991, the Golden Bay Planetarium was relocated from Civic Square in downtown Wellington and incorporated into the Carter site. This merger also resulted in the establishment of a new visitor centre and gift store, which helped to diversify the Observatory’s facilities and improve the visitor experience.

The Observatory’s role eventually shifted from a focus on scientific research to public education about space and astronomy. Parliament officially repealed the Carter Observatory Act in 2010 and transferred the responsibilities of the site from the Crown to the Wellington City Council. It is now one of four institutions run by Museums Wellington as part of Experience Wellington.

A digital fulldome planetarium system was installed during a refurbishment of the facility in 2010. Museums Wellington re-branded the Carter Observatory in 2015 to reflect its role in public education and tourism. It is now officially known as “Space Place at Carter Observatory” or “Space Place.”

== Facilities ==
Space Place houses two telescopes within its main building, as well as a planetarium. The Thomas Cooke telescope, a 9 3/4-inch Cooke refractor, serves as the primary telescope for public observing sessions. The Ruth Crisp telescope, a 16-inch Cassegrain reflector, arrived as a donation in 1968. Not far from the main building, Space Place also manages the Thomas King Observatory, previously used by the Wellington Astronomical Society. The historic Dominion Observatory is also located nearby, but this is not operated by Space Place.

=== The Thomas Cooke Telescope ===
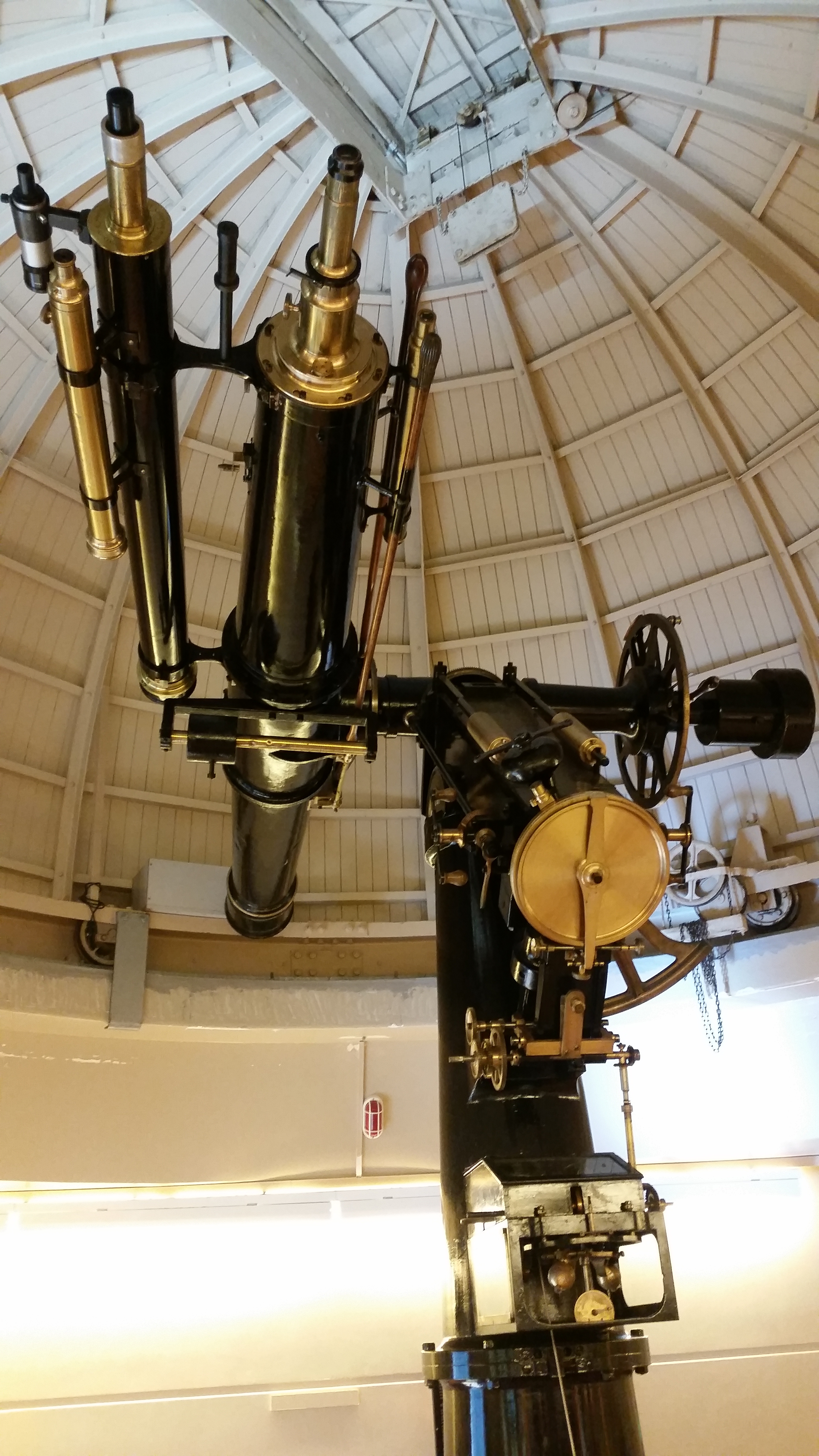
The Thomas Cooke telescope

The Thomas Cooke telescope is the main telescope in regular use at Space Place. It was manufactured in 1867 in York, England by T. Cooke & Sons, and originally installed at an observatory near Halifax, West Yorkshire. The astronomers Edward Crossley and Joseph Gledhill used the telescope over the course of several decades for their astronomical research.

In 1879, a clock drive was provided by the Grubb Telescope Company, and this still serves as the telescope's mechanical tracking system. The telescope’s original lens was a 9 1/3-inch achromat, which was replaced with a 9-inch Cooke photovisual objective in 1896. In 1896 or 1905, a 5-inch W. Watson & Sons guide scope was added alongside the main scope.

After Crossley’s death in 1905, the telescope was purchased by Reverend Dr David Kennedy and shipped to New Zealand, where it was installed at the Meeanee Observatory at the Marist Seminary near Napier. Kennedy used the telescope to take photographs of Halley’s Comet during its 1910 approach.

The Wellington City Council purchased the telescope for £2000 in 1923, and the telescope was shipped from Napier to Wellington. It was later transferred to the care of the Carter Observatory under the Carter Observatory Act (1938).

At the Carter Observatory site, the Cooke telescope was used for solar astronomy research as well as flare star and double star monitoring programs over the following decades. In April 1968, Carter Observatory was one of the observatories involved in recording an occultation of Neptune by the Moon. This was part of an international project in which U.S. Naval Observatory astronomers used photometric and visual data provided by New Zealand, Australian and Japanese observers to derive an improved value for the diameter of Neptune.

Due to degradation of the lens over its one hundred years of use, the photovisual objective was replaced in December 2001 with a 9 3/4-inch aplanatic objective.

=== The Ruth Crisp Telescope ===
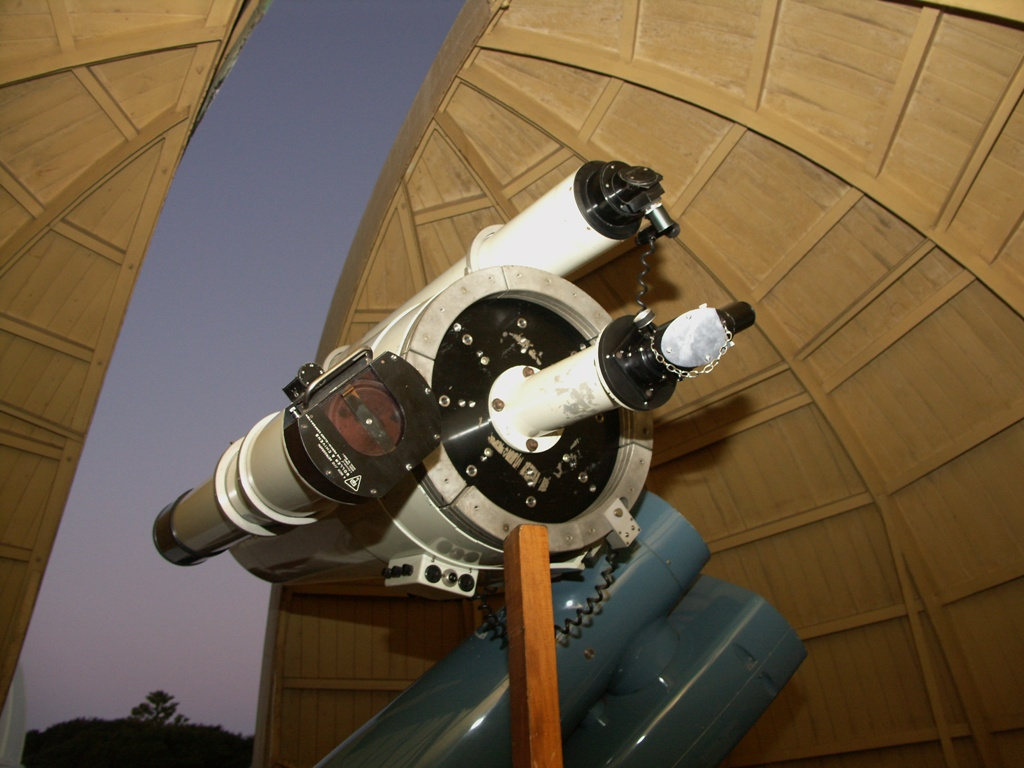
The Ruth Crisp telescope

The Ruth Crisp telescope, a 16-inch Cassegrain reflector manufactured by Boller and Chivens, was donated to the Observatory in 1968 by New Zealand writer and philanthropist Ruth Crisp. Once used for research at the Carter Observatory's outstation at Black Birch in the South Island, this telescope was later moved to the main premises in Wellington.

A grant from Pub Charity allowed improvements to the installation in December 2005: the Observatory had the dome motorised, and the telescope’s primary and secondary mirrors were re-aluminised.

=== Planetarium ===
The Golden Bay Planetarium was incorporated into Carter Observatory in 1991, with the Wellington Planetarium Society gifting their Zeiss planetarium to the Observatory Board.

A Sky-Skan digital fulldome planetarium system was installed during a refurbishment of the site in 2010. The nine-metre planetarium seats 66 people, and is equipped with DigitalSky software running across six 4K projectors.

=== The Thomas King Observatory ===
The nearby Thomas King Observatory is also managed by Space Place, and was last refurbished in May 2001. It housed a 5-inch Grubb telescope (manufactured in 1886), and this was used for both night observations as well as solar viewing through a hydrogen-alpha filter.

== Gallery ==
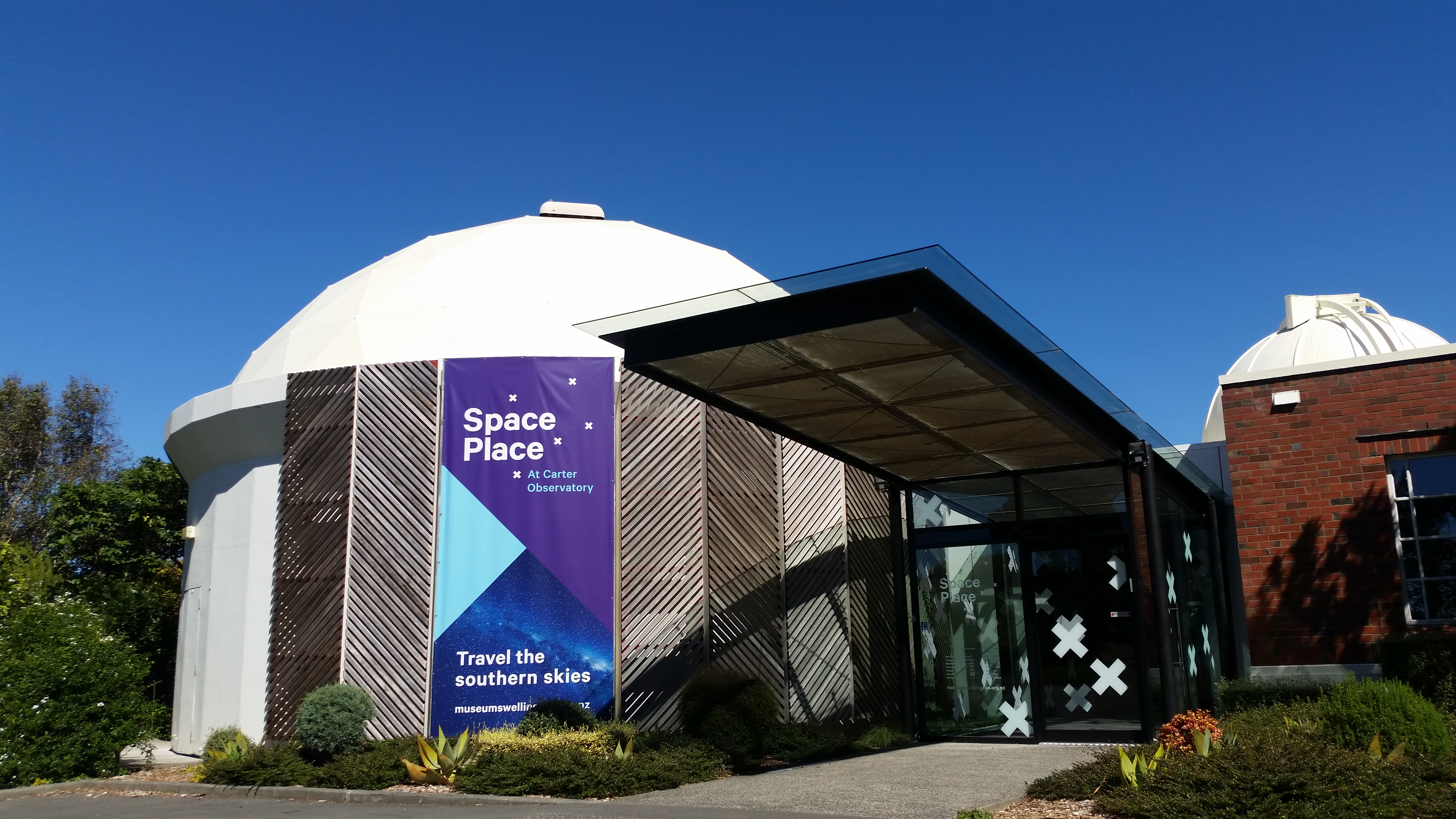
The entrance to Space Place

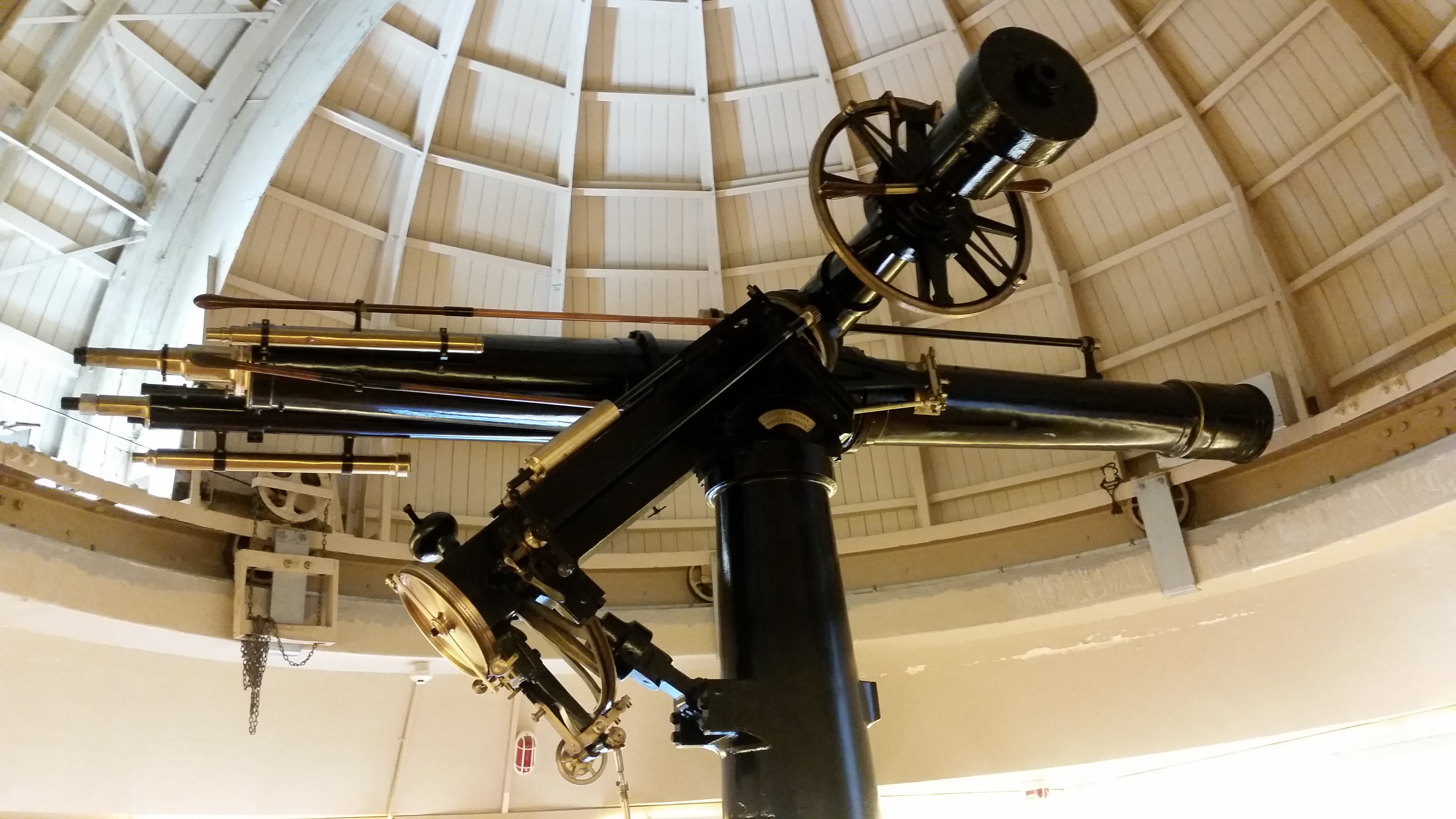
Side view of the Thomas Cooke telescope

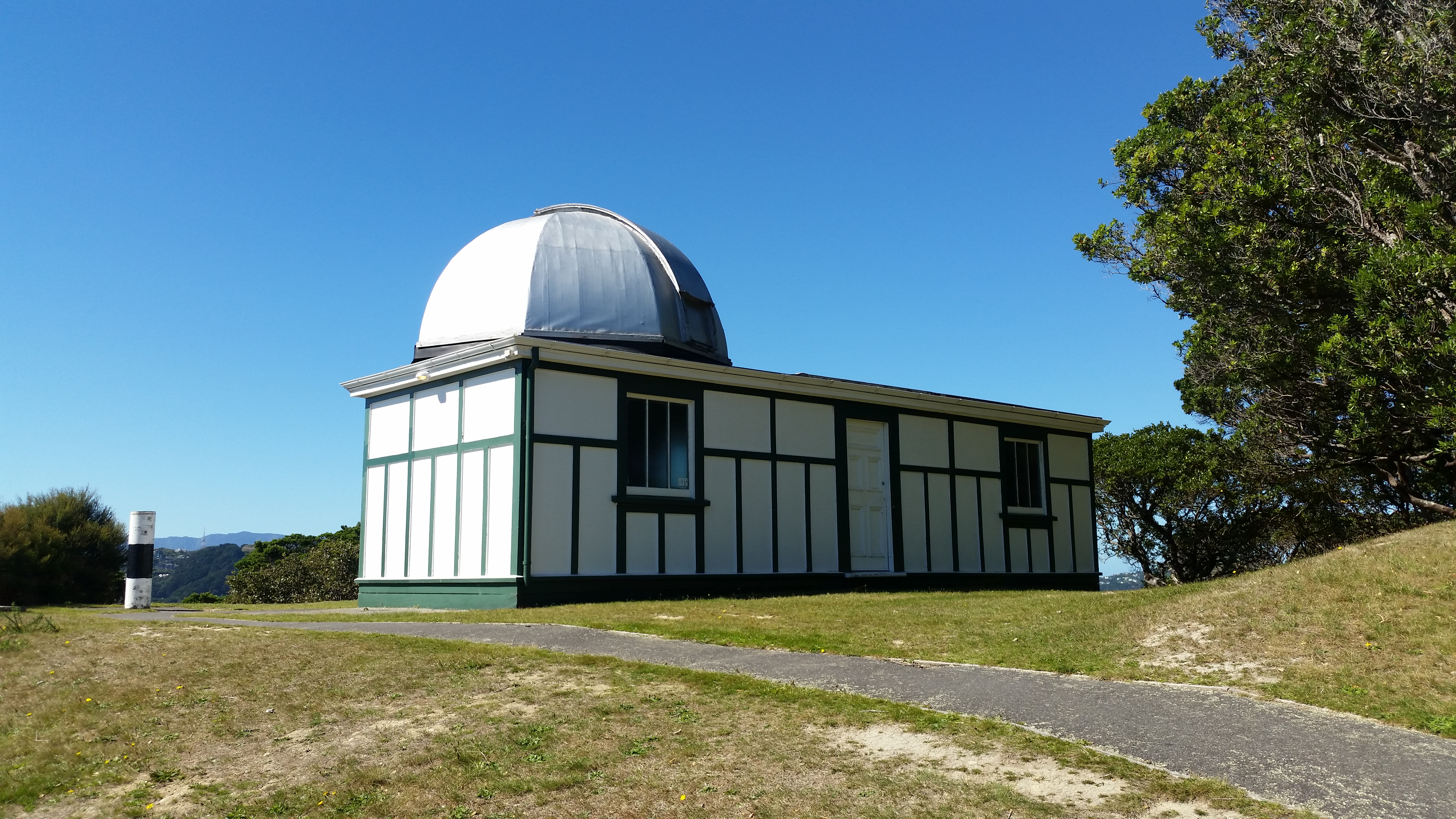
The nearby Thomas King Observatory

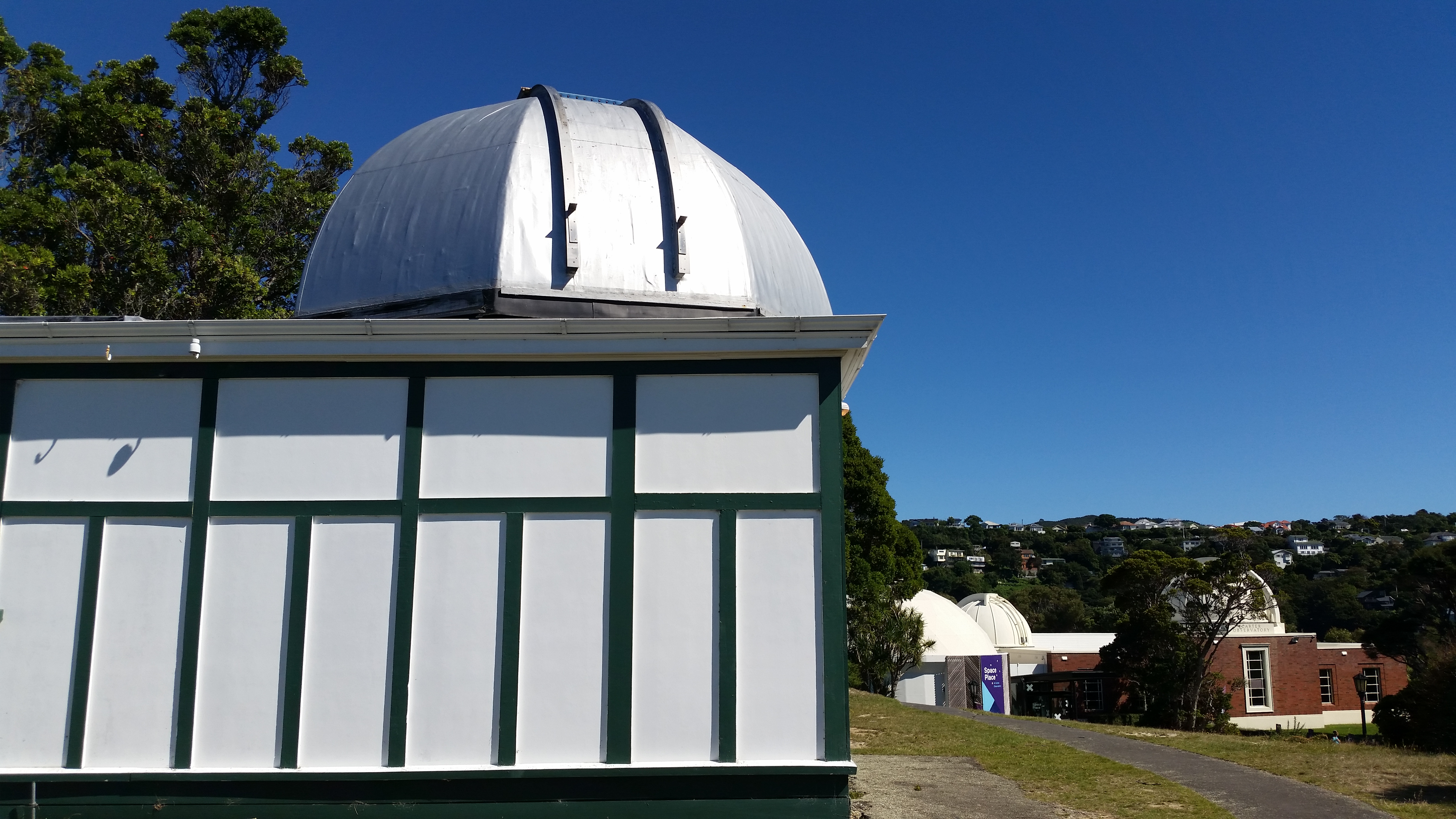
The Thomas King Observatory, looking towards Space Place

== See also ==
- Thomas King Observatory
- Dominion Observatory, Wellington
- Gifford Observatory, also located in Wellington
