= Dominion Observatory, Wellington =

Historic observatory in Wellington

Dominion Observatory
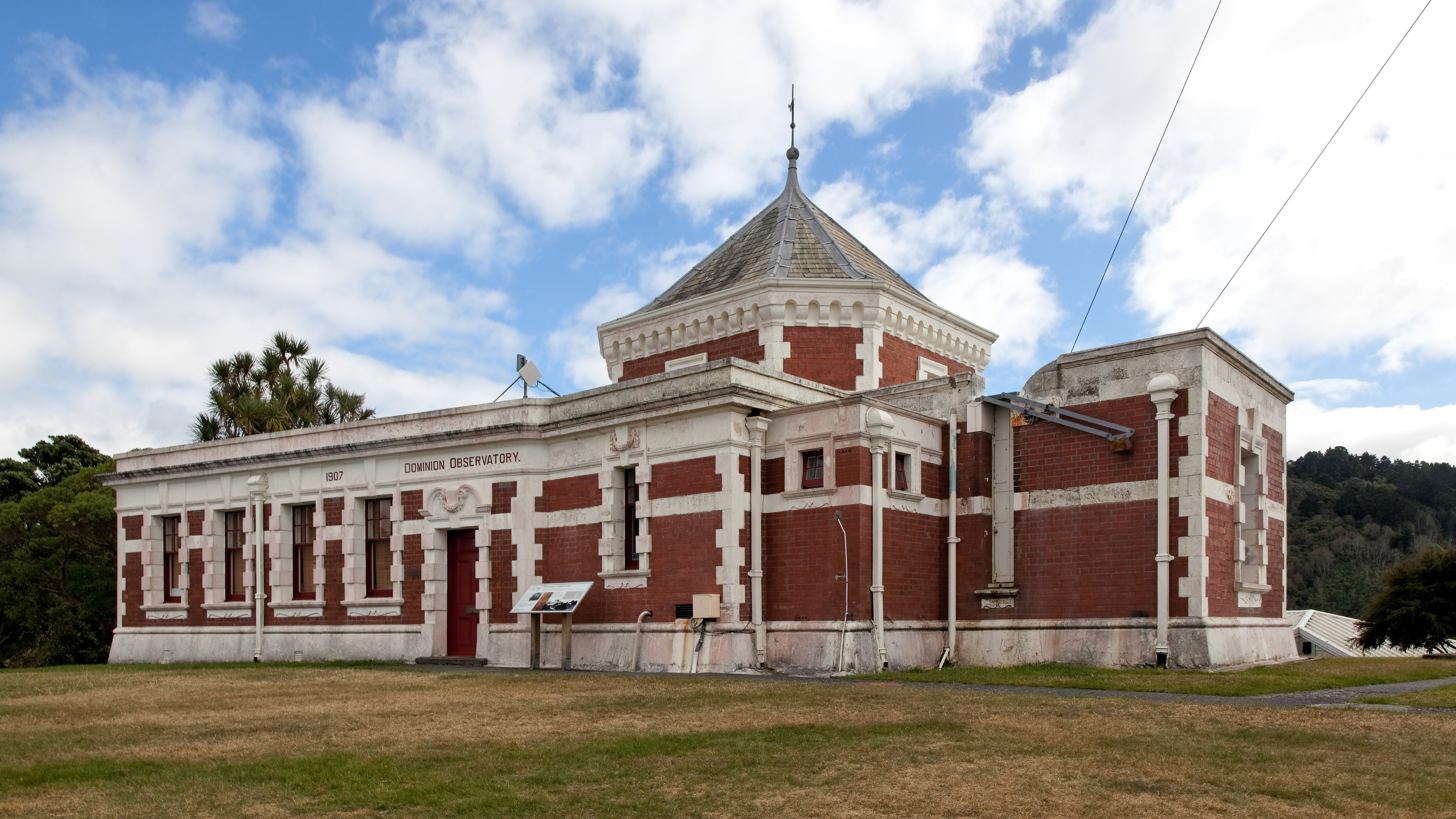
- Dominion Observatory
- Interactive map of the Dominion Observatory area

General information
- Architectural style: Edwardian Baroque
- Location: Wellington's Botanic Gardens, Wellington, New Zealand
- Coordinates: 41°17′02.9″S 174°46′05.6″E
- Completed: 1907

Design and construction
- Architect: John Campbell

Heritage New Zealand – Category 1
- Designated: 25 September 1986
- Reference no.: 4700

The Dominion Observatory is a historic observatory in the Botanic Gardens in Wellington, New Zealand. It was the second observatory in Wellington. It was built in 1907 and originally named the Hector Observatory after James Hector until 1925. It was built to replace the Colonial Observatory which was located in the Bolton Street Cemetery.

The observatory was primarily used to maintain New Zealand Mean Time for the Time Service based on astronomical observations. In 1868 the New Zealand Government adopted New Zealand mean time.

It was designed by architect John Campbell in the Edwardian Baroque style.

The observatory was vacant in 1993, and in 2003 it was refurbished by the Department of Conservation to be used by private businesses.

It is listed by Heritage New Zealand as a Category 1 Historic Place.
