= Tawata Productions =

- Formation: 2004
- Type: Theatre group
- Location: Wellington New Zealand
- Artistic director(s): Hone Kouka, Mīria George
- Website: https://tawataproductions.com

Tawata Productions is contemporary Māori and Pasifika performing arts company established in 2004 based in Te Whanganui-a-Tara (Wellington), New Zealand. They produce theatre, screen and digital work as well as the festivals: Kia Mau, Breaking Ground and the Pūtahi Festival. Tawata showcases work by Māori, Pasifika and Indigenous writers and makers and is led by Hone Kouka and Mīria George.

== About ==
Tawata Productions was founded by playwrights and directors Mīria George and Hone Kouka in 2004 and their home base is Te Whanganui-a-Tara, Wellington.

Tawata Productions produce and tour theatre productions. Productions include I, George Nepia (2011, by Hone Kouka), about rugby legend George Nēpia, He Reo Aroha, by Mīria George and Jamie McCaskill, The Prospect by Maraea Rakuraku, and Hui by Mitch Tawhi-Thomas.

Tawata are invested in promoting, producing and developing work, to this end they have started several events. In 2010 they created an annual festival called the Matariki Festival, first held at Circa Theatre, Matariki is the Māori New Year in midwinter. The Matariki Festival had a development programme that since has been renamed as Breaking Ground. Breaking Ground is a festival of new writing and ideas curated and produced by Tawata Productions. Kouka and George were inspired by a development dance festival hosted by Native Earth Performing Arts in Canada. The first plays workshopped at Breaking Ground in 2010 were Hui by Mitch Tawhi Thomas, The Prospect by Maraea Rakuraku and Taikaha by Hinekaa Mako. The Matariki Festival won Tawata Productions the Critics’ Wildcard award in 2015 at the Wellington Theatre Awards.

In 2011 Breaking Ground expanded with First Nation Canadian playwrights Yvette Nolan and Tara Beagan attended. Other artists who have had their writing workshopped and presented at Breaking Ground include Nancy Brunning in 2018 with Kingdom of Women, Sherilee Kahui, Victor Rodger, Barbara Hostelek, and Jordy Gregg (Tasmania). The workshops involve directors and dramaturgs such as Briar Grace-Smith, Rīwia Brown and Nathaniel Lees.

The Kia Mau Festival, formally the Ahi Kaa Festival, is a contemporary Indigenous theatre and dance festival held in Te Whanganui-a-Tara. It was initiated in 2015 by Tawata to platform Māori, Pasifika theatre and dance companies and to address the lack of programming for these companies in established theatres and festivals. Some companies that have presented work at the Kia Mau Festival include Hāpai Productions, Modern Māori Quartet, Taki Rua Productions, Agaram Productions, The Māori Sidesteps, Atamira Dance Company, Okareka Dance Company and Te Rēhia Theatre.

The Pūtahi Festival is for emerging practitioners to test and show works to an audience. It started in 2013 and for the first few years was held at Studio 77, the Theatre Department of Victoria University of Wellington. In 2021 it ran over nine days.

== Selected productions ==
Year	Production	Author	Crew	Cast	Event & Venue	Ref
2005	Fallow	Whiti Hereaka		Jason Te Kare, James Ashcroft		
2006	Yours Truly	Albert Belz	Director, David O'Donnell		BATS Theatre	
2006	and what remains	Mīria George	Director, Hone Kouka, Set design, Tony De Goldi, Costume design, Natalia Huaki Gwizdizardski, Lighting design, Rob Larsen, Sound design, Stephen Gallagher.	Simon Vincent, Erina Daniels, Semu Filipo, Rina Patel, Sam Selliman	BATS Theatre	
2010	He Reo Aroha	Mīria George and Jamie McCaskill	premiered in Wellington at the New Zealand Festival			
2011	I, George Nepia	Hone Kouka	Jason Te Kare (director), Robert Larsen (design), Cara Louise Waretini (costume), Karnan Saba (sound), Miriama Ketu-McKenzie (composition)	Jarod Rawiri	Circa Theatre, Wellington	
2011	Sunset Road	Mīria George	Director, Mīra George, Design, Tony de Goldi, Lighting, Ulli Briese, Sound, Karnan Saba, choreography Tai Paitai		Circa Theatre, Wellington	
2011	The Mourning After	Ahi Karunaharan	Directed by Miria George, Sound design, Karnan Saba, Lighting design, Laurie Dean	Ahi Karunaharan	The Box in Buick Street, Petone	
2013	Hui	Mitch Tawhi-Thomas	Director, Rachel House Set, Sean Coyle, Costume, Emma Ransley, Lighting, Jennifer Lal, Sound, Leon Radojkovic. Auckland Arts Festival	Stephen Butterworth, Xavier Horan, Tola Newbery, Maaka Pepene, Vinnie Bennett.	Q Theatre	
2018	Bless the Child	Hone Kouka	Director – Mīria George, Set Designer – Mark McEntyre, Lighting Designer – Natasha James, Sound Design – Te Aihe Butler & Chris Ward, Hohepa Waitoa and K*Saba, Costume Designer – Cara Louise Waretini, Stage Manager – Karena Letham. presented at the New Zealand Festival and the Auckland Arts Festival and winner of the Adam New Zealand Play Award.	Carrie Green, Moana Ete, Regan Taylor, Ani-Piki Tuari, Scotty Cotter, Shania Bailey-Edmonds, Maia Diamond, Lionel Wellington	Circa Theatre, Wellington	
2019	Henare	Hōhepa Waitoa	Directed by Hone Kouka	Hōhepa Waitoa, Sheree Waitoa	Te Tairāwhiti Arts Festival, Rāhui Marae, Tikitiki (in partnership with Mahi Mahi Productions)	
2012	The Prospect	Maraea Rakuraku	Directed by Tammy Davis, Sound design, Karnan Saba, Lighting design, Laurie Dean, Music, Rawiri and Joseph Hirini, Set and costume, Wai Mihinui, Jaimee Warda	Grace Hoet, Ralph Johnson, Rob Lloyd, Tola Newbery, Joe Dekkers-Reihana, Moana Ete	Gryphon Theatre, 22 Ghuznee Street, Wellington	
2015	Hīkoi	Nancy Brunning	Premiere - Auckland Arts Festival			
