= Carla van Zon =

New Zealander artistic director (1952–2026)

Carla van Zon ONZM
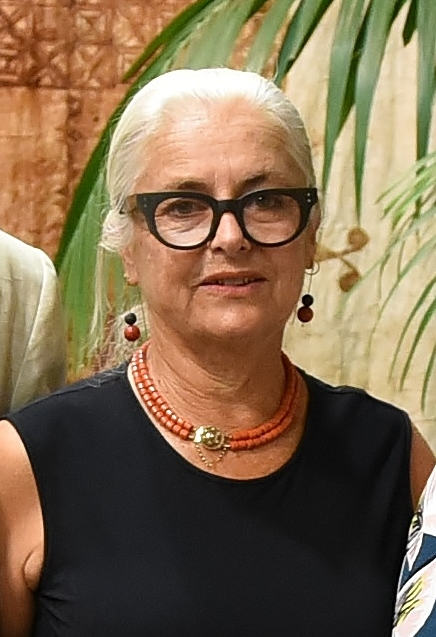
- Van Zon in 2017
- Born: Carla Marja Olga van Zon; 20 January 1952; Te Atatū, New Zealand
- Died: 29 April 2026 (aged 74)
- Education: University of Otago; George Washington University
- Occupation: Artistic director
- Employers: Creative New Zealand; New Zealand Festival of the Arts; Auckland Arts Festival
- Awards: Arts Wellingtonian of the Year (2005); Lifetime Achievement Award, Auckland Theatre Awards (2016); NEXT Woman of the Year (arts & culture) (2017)

Carla Marja Olga van Zon ONZM (20 January 1952 – 29 April 2026) was a New Zealand artistic director. She worked on international opportunities for New Zealand artists at Creative New Zealand, before becoming artistic director of the New Zealand International Festival of the Arts in Wellington in 1996. From 2013 she was the artistic director of the Auckland Arts Festival, where she was responsible for commissioning works such as the opera The Bone Feeder. Van Zon was responsible for supporting the careers of many New Zealand artists. She retired from the Auckland Arts Festival in 2017, following a diagnosis of kidney disease in 2016.

== Early life and education ==
Van Zon was born in Te Atatū in West Auckland on 20 January 1952, one of three girls born to Dutch immigrants, Boukje and Maurice van Zon, who had arrived via Indonesia. Her mother was a contemporary dance teacher and her father worked for Pan Am. She studied contemporary dance at the University of Otago in Dunedin, earning a degree in physical education, and then became a physical education teacher at Green Bay High School. In the early 1980s, she earned a Master of Arts degree in dance and arts administration at George Washington University.

== Career ==
Van Zon's career in arts administration began at Creative New Zealand, where she worked to improve international opportunities for New Zealand artists. She managed New Zealand's entry to the 2009 Venice Biennale. She was involved with the New Zealand International Festival of the Arts in Wellington from 1989; from 1996 she was executive director, and was appointed artistic director in 2000. Van Zon helped the festival turn a profit for the first time, and during her time it won four national tourism awards and the Dominion Gold Award for outstanding contribution to the Wellington economy.

From 2013 to 2017, she was the artistic director of the Auckland Arts Festival, managing four festivals over that period, and doubling the attendance records. Of her approach to the festival being in Auckland and part of the Pacific, arts festival programme manager Tama Waipara said "The first thing was she put tangata whenua front and centre ... She said we have to know who we are and where we are." In 2011, van Zon asked Renee Liang to rewrite her play The Bone Feeder as an opera, and commissioned it for the Auckland Festival. She was also instrumental in the careers of writer and actor Nancy Brunning, directors Jason Te Kare and Sara Brodie, writers Mei-Lin Te Puia Hansen, Victor Rodger, and Hone Kouka, composers Gareth Farr, John Psathas and Dame Gillian Whitehead.

Van Zon was a board member of the charity Track Zero, which aims to connect artists and scientists to create work about climate change, and she wrote about the importance of artists speaking out against climate change.

== Personal life, illness, and death ==
Van Zon lived in Ōtaki, north of Wellington, with husband Gregg Fletcher.

In June 2016, van Zon was diagnosed with chronic kidney disease, and retired from the Auckland Arts Festival at the end of April 2017. She died from the disease on 29 April 2026, at the age of 74.

== Honours and awards ==
In the 2000 Queen's Birthday Honours, van Zon was appointed an Officer of the New Zealand Order of Merit, for services to the arts.

Van Zon was voted the Arts Wellingtonian of the Year for 2005. In 2016, she was awarded the Lifetime Achievement Award at the Auckland Theatre Awards. In 2017, she was named 2017 NEXT Woman of the Year, in the Arts & Culture category.

In 2019, she was awarded an honorary doctorate of laws from the University of Otago, and during the graduation ceremony she urged those present to "Be curious, be open to people and experiences, take slow steps and enjoy the journeys down different pathways."
