= Tanea Heke =

New Zealand actor, producer and director

Tanea Heke MNZM
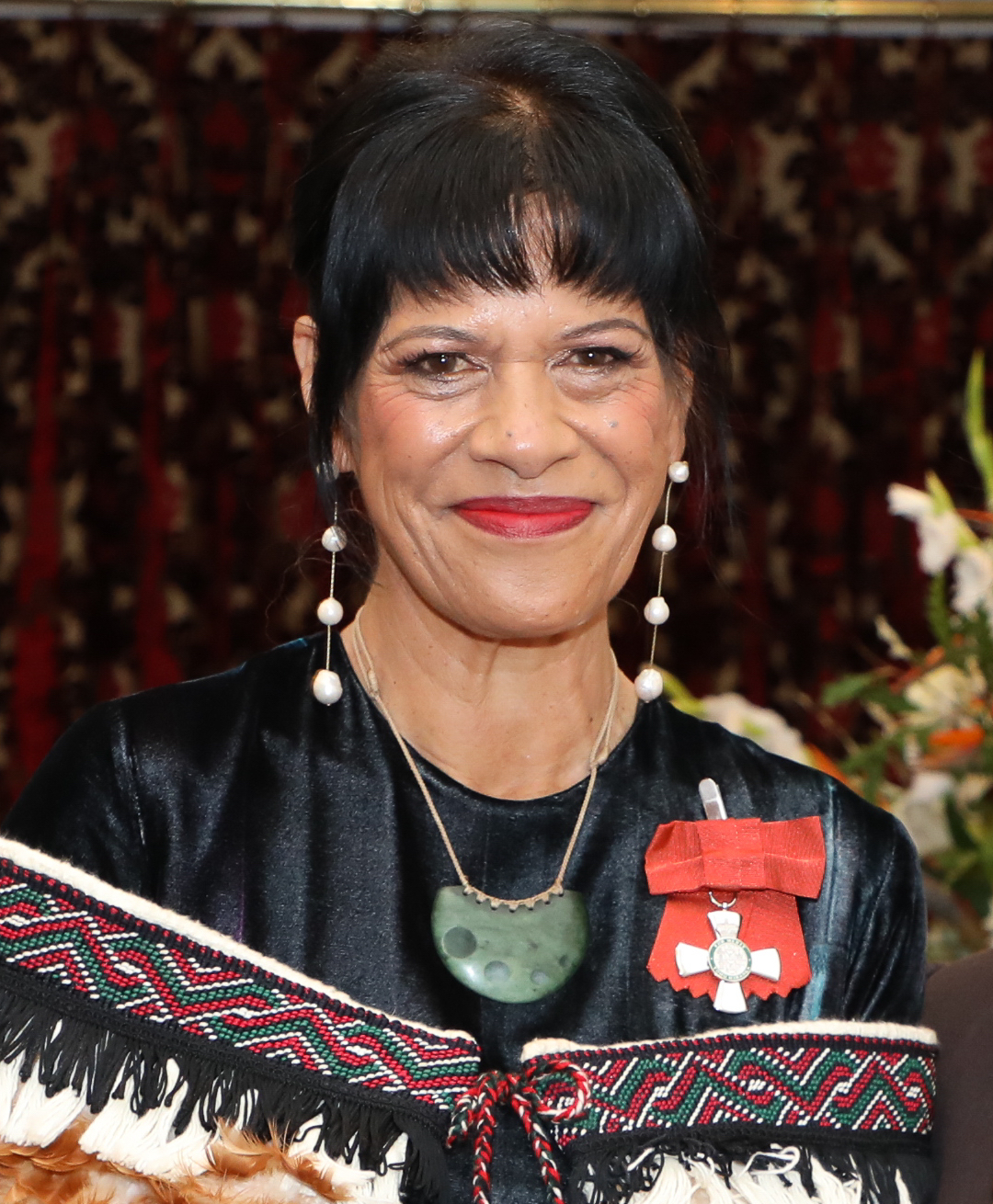
- Heke in 2022
- Education: Toi Whakaari: New Zealand Drama School
- Occupation: Theatre
- Employer: Toi Whakaari: New Zealand Drama School
- Awards: Making a Difference Award, Ngā Tohu Hautūtanga Auaha Toi, 2020, Creative New Zealand

Tanea Jane Heke MNZM is an actor, director and producer of theatre in New Zealand. In 2019 she was appointed as Tumuaki/Director of Toi Whakaari: NZ Drama School.

== Career ==
Heke is a 1997 graduate from Toi Whakaari: NZ Drama School and was appointed director at the end of 2019 after doing the role as interim director since the beginning of the year. She founded Hāpai Productions to create and support Māori theatre in 2013 with the late Nancy Brunning. Hāpai Productions has a focus on making opportunities for Māori women in theatre. Heke has also worked at Taki Rua Productions, Te Papa Tongarewa where she was an exhibitions manager and Creative New Zealand, where she worked with Carla Van Zon.

== Directing ==
In 1995 Heke directed Maua Taua by Hinemoana Baker at Taki Rua Theatre as part of their Te Reo Māori season performed in the Māori language. In 1998 Heke directed GrandfatherSon by Kirk Torrance at BATS Theatre.

== Acting roles ==
Film performances
Year	Title	Role	Director	Notes	Ref
2006	No. 2	Aunty Cat	Toa Fraser		
2007	Eagle vs Shark				
2015	Belief: The Possession of Janet Moses				
2017	Waru	Charm	Ainsley Gardiner, Casey Kaa, Renae Maihi		
2021	Cousins	Mata	Ainsley Gardiner and Briar Grace-Smith		

Television performances
Year	Title	Role	Director	Notes	Ref
2021	Wellington Paranormal	Council Worker	Jemaine Clement	Fatberg	
2025	Warren's Vortex	Aunty Marama			

Theatre performances
Year	Title	Playwright	Role	Director	Producer	Notes	Ref
1989	Bystander: Stress Release Tips for the Emotionally Disturbed	Duncan Sarkies	Actor	Duncan Sarkies	STAB	BATS Theatre	
1995	Macbeth	Shakespeare	Weird Sister	Carol Stevenson	Victoria University Summer Shakespeare, 13th annual production	The Dell, Botanic Gardens (Wellington)	
1998	Coriolanus	Shakespeare	Volumnia	Burt Turner; Oliver Driver	Auckland's 35th Annual Outdoor Shakespeare.	Old Arts Quad, Auckland University	
1999	Julius Caesar	Shakespeare	Portia	Phillip Mann		Circa Theatre	
1999	Kitchen Tables	Glenda Tuaine		Glenda Tuaine		Circa Theatre	
2000	Box/Role/Dream	Lynda Chanwai Earle	Actor (Tanya)	Vanessa Byrnes		BATS Theatre	
2000	The Hand Job	Conrad Newport	Christine Cowell	Conrad Newport		BATS Theatre	
2001	Haruru Mai	Briar Grace-Smith	Pearl	Simon Praast	Auckland Theatre Company		
2001	Home	Samm-Art Williams		Nina Nawalowalo; Glenda Tuaine		BATS Theatre	
2004	The Prophet	Hone Kouka	Kay - Joshua's mother	Nina Nawalowalo	Taki Rua Productions	NZ International Festival of the Arts (Wellington)	
2007	Doubt	John Patrick Shanley		Sue Rider		Circa Theatre	
2007	Revenge of the Amazons	Jean Betts	Puck	Rachel More; Jacqueline Coats	Upskill Productions	BATS Theatre	
2018	He Kura E Huna Ana	Hohepa Waitoa	Taua	Nancy Brunning	Taki Rua Productions	BATS Theatre	
2018	Astroman	Albert Belz		Nancy Brunning		Court Theatre	

== Honours and awards ==
In 2020 Heke won Creative New Zealand's Making a Difference Award, Ngā Tohu Hautūtanga Auaha Toi.

In the 2022 New Year Honours, Heke was appointed a Member of the New Zealand Order of Merit, for services to the arts and Māori.
