= Lynda Chanwai-Earle =

New Zealand writer and radio producer

Lynda Chanwai-Earle is a New Zealand writer and radio producer. Her written work includes plays, poems and film scripts. The play Ka Shue – Letters Home in 1996 is semi-autobiographical and is significant in New Zealand literature as the first authentically New Zealand–Chinese play for mainstream audiences.

== Background ==
The daughter of a Chinese mother and a Pākehā father, she was born in London and spent her early years in Papua New Guinea, completing her schooling in New Zealand. She studied fine arts at the Elam School of Fine Arts, drama at the University of Auckland and script writing at Victoria University of Wellington.

== Career ==
Lynda Chanwai-Earle's poetry has appeared in literary journals in New Zealand and elsewhere including Landfall, Hecate and Antic. Her poems are included in the anthologies Sevensome (1993) and Going Solo (1997).

Chanwai-Earle represented New Zealand at the inaugural Hong Kong Literary Festival in 2001 and was the NZ Poet Delegate attending the 2002 Asia-Pacific Conference on Indigenous and Contemporary Poetry in Manila, Philippines. In 2003 she was the Trans-Tasman writer at the 2003 Queensland Poetry Festival, she also attended the Shanghai Literary Festival in 2005. In 2015 at Sun Yat-sen University, Guangzhou Chanwai-Earle was the inaugural NZ writer in resident.

Lynda Chanwai-Earle co-wrote the short film Chinese Whispers with Neil Pardington and Stuart McKenzie. She co-directed the short film After with Simon Raby). In 2019 Chanwai Earle was the writer in residence at Victoria University of Wellington, working on a film adaptation of her play Man in a Suitcase, based on the real-life murder of a Chinese student in Auckland.

Chanwai-Earle has been short-listed several times for the Bruce Mason Playwriting Award. In 1996 when she premiered her one-woman show Ka-Shue (Letters Home) in 1996 there was no other reflection of modern Asian-Kiwi identity in professional theatre. In an interview for a journal Chanwai-Earle recalls some audience feedback,

"I saw your play in Christchurch and it changed my life and my sister’s. We are both Eurasian and we never had anything to do with our Paw Paw, she spoke Cantonese and we could not understand her. But I saw your play and I was really moved and we really made an effort to speak to her".

In the late 1990s Chanwai-Earle toured with the Māori theatre company Te Rākau Hua O Te Wao Tapu as a script coordinator and drama facility, as well as a performer. She was involved with two theatrical projects created in prisons, A Christmas Wish at Arohata Women's Prison (1997), and Kia Maumahara at Christchurch Women's Prison and the Christchurch Arts Festival (1997).

The 2008 touring production of her play Heat was designed as the world's first piece of emission-neutral theatre. Heat is about a love triangle between a woman, a man and a penguin. Brian Hotter, the actor who played the penguin won Best Actor at Chapman Trip Theatre Awards in 2008. There are two other two scripts in the pipeline to complete the Antarctic Trilogy which began with HEAT.

From May 2011 to July 2018 Chanwai-Earle worked as a producer and presenter for Radio New Zealand including on the documentary podcast series Voices which features people from diverse global backgrounds living in New Zealand.

Chanwai-Earle has been involved in a number of multimedia works presented in galleries and other spaces.

== Influences ==
Chanwai-Earle names a few New Zealand writers and theatre-makers as an influence on her including writers Briar Grace-Smith, Dave Armstrong, Ken Duncum, Hone Kouka, and directors and actors Jim Moriarty and Miranda Harcourt. In addition her writing has also been influenced by playwrights Jean Genet, Tennessee Williams and Sam Shepard, musician Tom Waits, poet Pamala Karol from Los Angeles, authors Amy Tan and William Yan and Australian Chinese playwright and photographer who wrote a solo show called Sadness, which was a strong influence for Chanwai-Earle's solo show Ka Shue.

== Selected works ==
=== Plays ===
- Ka Shue – Letters Home (1996)
- Alchemy (1998). Winner Best of the Fringe Award, Wellington Fringe Festival (1998)
- Monkey, (2004). Nominated for two Chapman Tripp Theatre Awards
- Heat, play (2004). Nominated for two Chapman Tripp Theatre Awards, winner Best Actor
- Box/Role/Dream (2000). Winner Best of the Fringe Award, Wellington Fringe Festival
- Foh-Sarn – Fire Mountain (2000)

=== Poetry ===
- Honeypants (1994), Auckland UP, Auckland. Shortlisted for the Penn Book Awards and New Zealand Book Awards

==== Published in poetry collections ====
Chanwai-Earle's poetry has also appeared in the following: Landfall, Printout, Hecate, New Zealand Electronic Poetry Centre, Honouring Fathers: An International Poetry Collection, (Yson and Abad), New New Zealand Poets in Performance, (Ross and Kemp).

=== Film ===
- Chinese Whispers (1996). Co-wrote with Neil Pardington and Stuart McKenzie. Art director. Short film. Produced by MAP Productions.
- After (2003). Co-directed with Simon Raby. Short film.
- Farewell Guangdong (2025). Directed by Chanwai-Earle, edited by Peter Lee, produced by Tawera Productions for Radio New Zealand. A documentary series from the book Farewell Guangdong by historian Lily Lee. Based in Guangdong province.
- I Duok Om I Bohuntung – The Owl and The Rainbow (2026). Writer Chanwau Earle. Directed by Jo Luping. Winner of the 2026 imagineNATIVE Animated Short Award.

=== Multimedia ===
- Directed by Lynda Chanwai-Earle and edited by Peter Lee, produced by the award-winning team behind Tawera Productions for Radio New Zealand,
- Spawn – Spurn, Red Zephyr Festival, B-Side, Auckland University, 1991–1992
- Dementia Praecox, Wellington and Auckland City Galleries 1993
- Standard Deviation, Artspace, Auckland, 1993
- Yum Char, Herald, 1996
- Letters, New China — a New Zealand Exhibition, NZ Festival of the Arts, 1996.
