= Sophie Roberts =

Actor and director in New Zealand

Sophie Roberts is a theatre director and actor of New Zealand. She is the artistic director of Silo Theatre in Auckland, New Zealand.

== Career ==
Roberts graduated from Toi Whakaari the national New Zealand drama school in 2007. After graduating until 2014 Roberts worked on many plays as a director or actor. Roberts was in a creative partnership with Willem Wassenaar as founder and co-artistic director Wellington-based theatre company Almost a Bird Theatre Collective.

Roberts was appointed artistic director of Auckland's Silo Theatre in 2014 and her career focused on that theatre company. The first play she directed in 2014 at Silo Theatre was Sunday Roast by Thomas Sainsbury.

One of the plays Roberts programmed at Silo Theatre at Q Theatre to centre female experiences on the main stage was the feminist play The Writer by Ella Hickson. Roberts directed HIR by Taylor Mac in 2018. Roberts at Silo Theatre commissioned the debut theatre show of Chris Parker, No More Dancing in the Good Room. In 2021 Roberts handed over the reigns of Silo Theatre to Ahi Karunaharan for health reasons.

Roberts announced for 2023 that Silo Theatre would not stage any shows to focus on development of three plays and in a response to the effects of the COVID-19 pandemic on the theatre company and the industry in Auckland and New Zealand. Roberts said of the 2024 season at Silo: "We want to bring you experiences that are little celebrations of the moment we’re briefly on this earth, and how we might take care of it, each other, and ourselves while we’re here."

== Selected acting credits ==
- Angels in America
- A Streetcar Named Desire
- Antigone
- Blood Wedding
- The Vagina Monologues
- Delicates
- Broken China
- Abigail’s Party
- Wolf’s Lair (solo)

== Selected directing credits ==
- Hudson & Halls Live! (2017) - Co-creator, Court Theatre
- The Events, Silo Theatre
- Boys Will Be Boys, Silo Theatre
- Perplex, Silo Theatre
- The Book of Everything, Silo Theatre
- Midsummer, Silo Theatre
- The Pride, Silo Theatre
- I Love You Bro, Silo Theatre
- Sunday Roast, Silo Theatre

== Awards ==
- Best Performer: Wellington Fringe Festival
- Best New Director: Wellington Theatre Awards
- Best New Actress: Wellington Theatre Awards
- Production of the Year: Wellington Theatre Awards
- Excellence Award for The Book of Everything: Auckland Theatre Awards
- Best New Playwright: Wellington Theatre Awards - (nomination)
- Woman Of The Year, Next magazine - (nomination)
