= Rachel House =

New Zealand actress and director (born 1971)

Rachel House ONZM
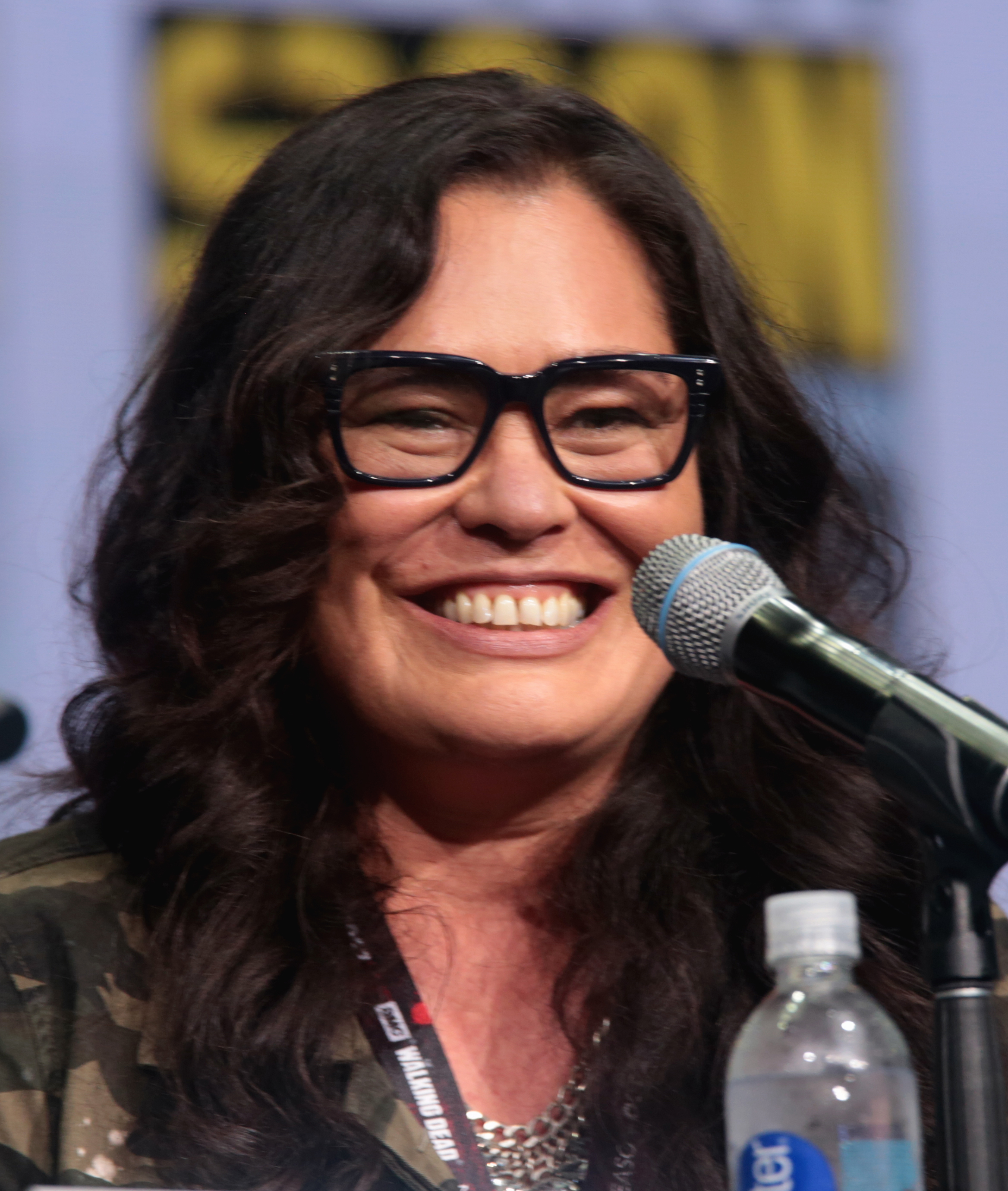
- House at the 2017 San Diego Comic-Con
- Born: Rachel Jessica Te Ao Maarama House; 20 October 1971 (age 55); Auckland, New Zealand
- Occupations: Actress; director
- Years active: 1992–present

Rachel Jessica Te Ao Maarama House ONZM (born 20 October 1971) is a New Zealand actress and director. She is best known for her roles in the films of Taika Waititi. She has received numerous accolades including an Arts Laureate, NZ Order of Merit, "Mana Wahine" from WIFT NZ and Te Waipuna a Rangi (Matariki Awards) for her contributions as an actor and director.

== Early life ==
House was born 20 October 1971 in Auckland and raised in Kamo, Whangārei by her adoptive Scottish parents John and Sheila House. Her Māori iwi (tribal) affiliations are Ngāti Mutunga, Te Ātiawa and Ngāi Tahu.

== Career ==
=== Acting ===
House attended the New Zealand national drama school, Toi Whakaari, graduating in 1992. She went into stage work with the Pacific Underground Theatre and the Auckland Theatre Company.

She has acted in several major productions that have toured nationally and internationally, including Hone Kouka's Waiora, Carol Anne Duffy's The Worlds Wife and the UK/New Zealand co-production of Beauty and the Beast.

In 1998, House made her screen debut in the short film Queenie and Pete. In 2002, she appeared in the award-winning feature film Whale Rider. In 2005, she became a series regular on Maddigan's Quest alongside a young Rose McIver.

In 2008, House appeared in Taika Waititi's first feature film, Eagle vs Shark. She has gone on to become a regular collaborator with Waititi, appearing in his second film, Boy, in 2010 and coaching the young actors on set. In 2016, she appeared in Waititi's fourth film, Hunt for the Wilderpeople, and again provided acting coaching for the young lead Julian Dennison.

House voiced Gramma Tala in the 2016 Disney animated film Moana. In 2017, she played Grandmaster's bodyguard Topaz in Thor: Ragnarok. In 2019, she was one of the leading roles in Bellbird, a film that received several awards at several international film festivals. In 2020, she voiced Terry in the Pixar animated film Soul.

She plays one of the main roles in the Australian 2023 comedy drama series Bay of Fires, and in 2024, reprised her role in the second season of the award-winning Netflix series Heartbreak High. In response to her work in Australia, Bridget McManus of the Sydney Morning Herald wrote, "with her commanding presence and unmistakable New Zealand accent, Rachel House is a serial scene-stealer on Australian television and film."

In television, House became a series regular in the Netflix reboot series Heartbreak High as Principal Stacy "Woodsy" Woods in 2022. The same year, House also appeared in the Apple TV+ series Foundation and ABC series Bay of Fires. In 2023, House portrayed the pirate Mary Read in season 2 of the HBO Max comedy Our Flag Means Death.

As a voice actor, she is known for her roles as "Gramma Tala" in Disney's Moana (2016) and "Terry" in Pixar's Soul (2020). In 2023 she voiced "Grandma Coco" in the Māori language version of Pixar's Coco (2017). She has starred in numerous animated series for television, including Sherwood, The Lion Guard, Amphibia, Pinecone and Pony, What If...?, Kiff and Koala Man.

As an acting coach, House has worked alongside Jane Campion for Top of the Lake and The Power of the Dog (2021); and with Taika Waititi on Boy (2010), Hunt for the Wilderpeople (2016), Jojo Rabbit (2019) and Next Goal Wins (2023).

House was named as part of the cast for Stan Australia series Sunny Nights.

=== Directing ===
House has directed numerous theatrical performances, short films and a feature film released in 2024.

After graduating from drama school in 1992, House went on to direct theatrical performances, including Have Car, Will Travel by Mitch Tawhi Thomas in 2001 for which she won several awards.

In 2008, House studied directing at the Prague Film School in the Czech Republic. While there she made two short films, Bravo and New Skirt.

In 2010, she directed Kylie Meehan's short film The Winter Boy, produced by Hineani Melbourne for the New Zealand Film Commission's Premiere Shorts.

In 2012, House directed the Māori-language version of Shakespeare's Troilus and Cressida, Toroihi rāua ko Kahira, adapted by Te Haumihiata Mason and set in a classical Māori and a pre-colonial Māori world. It was performed as part of an international series at London's Globe Theatre. Other theatre directing work includes the award-winning production of Hinepau, which House also co-adapted from Gavin Bishop's original book and toured both nationally and internationally, Neil La Bute's The Mercy Seat and Hui by longtime collaborator Mitch Tawhi Thomas that premiered at the Auckland Arts Festival in 2013.

In 2016, House directed Auckland-based theatre company Silo Theatre's production of Medea, a contemporary retelling of the Euripides myth created by Australian theatre-makers Kate Mulvany and Anne-Louise Sarks.

House has co-directed with Tweedie Waititi of Matewa Media for the Māori language versions of Disney animated films The Lion King (2004) and Moana (2016).

In 2024, House's first feature film as a director premiered in Taranaki, Aotearoa New Zealand. The Mountain is "a heartfelt drama about three children on a mission to find healing under the watchful eye of Taranaki Maunga (Mountain) and discover friendship in the spirit of adventure".

== Recognition ==
In 1995, House won the "Most Promising Female Newcomer of the Year" Chapman Tripp Theatre Award for her one-woman show Nga Pou Wahine by Briar Grace-Smith. In 2000, she won Most Outstanding Performance for her role in Witi Ihimaera's critically acclaimed play Woman Far Walking (as Tiriti, a 160-year-old woman) and in 2003, Best Supporting Actress in Henrik Ibsen's An Enemy of the People.

House won the 2001 Director of the Year award at both the Chapman Tripp Theatre Awards and the New Zealand Listener Awards for her direction of Mitch Tawhi Thomas' play Have Car Will Travel.

She attended the Prague Film School in 2008 and was awarded Best Director and Best Film Audience Award for her two short films made while studying there.

In 2012, she received the New Zealand Arts Foundation's Laureate Award, which is given as an investment in excellence across a range of art forms for an artist with prominence and outstanding potential for future growth. In the same year, she won Production of the Year and Director of the Year at the Chapman Tripp Theatre Awards, for her direction of Toroihi rāua ko Kahira.

In 2016, House received the WIFT (Women in Film and Television) NZ Mana Wāhine Award for her prolific contribution to theatre and film, both in front of and behind the camera.

In the 2017 Queen's Birthday Honours, House was appointed an Officer of the New Zealand Order of Merit for services to the performing arts.

In 2018, House was a joint winner with Professor Derek Lardelli of the Te Waipuna-ā-Rangi Award for Arts and Entertainment at the Matariki Awards, held by Whakaata Māori (formerly Māori TV).

== Filmography ==
=== Film ===
Year	Title	Role	Notes
2002	Whale Rider	Shilo	
2004	Fracture	Taxi driver	
2006	Perfect Creature	Forensic woman	
2007	Eagle vs Shark	Nancy	
2010	Boy	Aunty Gracey	Also acting coach
2013	White Lies	Maraea	
2014	Everything We Loved	TV reporter (voice)	
2014	The Dark Horse	Vagrant woman	
2016	Hunt for the Wilderpeople	Paula Hall	Director's intern and dialogue coach
2016	The Rehearsal	Rewia	
2016	Cradle	System (voice)	Short film
2016	Moana	Gramma Tala (voice)	English and Māori-language dubbings
2017	Thor: Ragnarok	Topaz	
2019	Bellbird	Connie	
2019	Jojo Rabbit	American Soldier	Deleted scene; also acting coach
2020	Ellie & Abbie (& Ellie's Dead Aunt)	Patty	
2020	Penguin Bloom	Gaye	
2020	Soul	Terry (voice)	
2020	Baby Done	Principal Mullins	
2021	Cousins	Missy	
2021	Rhys Darby: Mystic Time Bird	The Shaman (voice)	Recorded voice role
2021	Millie Lies Low	Marlene	
2021	Back to the Outback	Jacinta (voice)	
2023	The Portable Door	Nienke Van Spee	
2023	Next Goal Wins	Ruth	
2023	The Moon Is Upside Down	Tuffy	
2023	Coco	Mamá Coco (voice)	Māori-language dubbing
2024	Godzilla x Kong: The New Empire	Hampton	
2024	Moana 2	Gramma Tala (voice)	House reprises her role in the film's Māori-language dubbing as well; also contributed to film's soundtrack
2025	A Minecraft Movie	Malgosha (voice)	
2025	Kangaroo	Jesse	
2025	Zootopia 2	Gramma Taller (Voice)	Cameo
2026	Klara and the Sun	Melania	
2027	Ally	(voice)	In-production

=== Director ===
Year	Title	Notes
2008	Bravo	Short film
2008	New Skirt	Short film
2010	The Winter Boy	Short film
2024	The Mountain	

=== Television ===
Year	Title	Role	Notes
1996	Queenie and Pete	Queenie	
1998	Duggan	Warder	Introductory episode 2: "Sins of the Fathers"
1998	Tiger Country	Faenza	Television movie
1999–2000	The Life and Times of Te Tutu	Hine	Core cast
2002	Mataku	Rachel	Season 1; episode 3: "Going to War"
2002	Revelations – The Initial Journey	Ocelot	
2005	Ask Your Auntie	Panelist	
2006	Maddigan's Quest	Goneril	Core cast. 8 episodes
2011	Super City	Roimata	Season 1; 2 episodes
2013	The Blue Rose	Tina	3 episodes
2014	Hope and Wire	Joycie Waru	Miniseries; 3 episodes
2014–2016	Soul Mates	Mum	Seasons 1 & 2; 10 episodes
2015	Find Me a Māori Bride	Kuini	Season 1; episode 2
2016	Wolf Creek	Ruth	Season 1; episode 2 & 6: "Kutyukutyu" and "Wolf Creek"
2018	Wrecked	Martha	Season 3; 7 episodes
2018, 2020	The New Legends of Monkey	Monica / Demon Queen Hakuru	Season 1 & 2; 7 episodes
2019	Sherwood	Tui	7 episodes
2019	Get Krack!n	Sybill Rigg	Season 2; episode 5
2019	Over and Out	Barbar	Miniseries; episode 4
2019	Aroha Bridge	Whaea Bubbles	Season 3; 6 episodes
2019	The Lion Guard	Mama Binturong (voice)	Season 3; 6 episodes
2020	Stateless	Harriet	Miniseries; 6 episodes
2020–2021	100% Wolf: Legend of the Moonstone	Ms. Afeaki (voice)	11 episodes
2021	Cowboy Bebop	Mao	Main cast. 3 episodes
2021, 2023	Creamerie	Doc Garvey	Seasons 1 & 2; 8 episodes
2021–2024	What If...?	Topaz (voice)	Seasons 1–3; 3 episodes
2022	Amphibia	Parisia (voice)	Season 3; episode 12: "Olm Town Road"
2022–2023	Pinecone & Pony	Gladys (voice)	Recurring role. Seasons 1 & 2; 7 episodes
2022–2026	Heartbreak High	Woodsy	Recurring role. Seasons 1, 2, 3; 20 episodes
2023	Koala Man	Janine / Louise (voice)	Main role. 6 episodes
2023	Bay of Fires	Airini	Season 1; 5 episodes
2023	Foundation	Tellem Bond	Season 2; 5 episodes
2023	Our Flag Means Death	Mary Read	Season 2; episode 4: "Fun and Games"
2023	Kiff	Mary Buns (voice)	4 episodes
2023	100% Wolf: Book of Hath	Ms. Afeaki (voice)	17 episodes
2024	Time Bandits	Fianna	10 episodes
2024	The Legend of Vox Machina	Dohla (voice)	Season 3; episodes 3 & 5: "Vexations" and "The Frigid Doom"
2025	Sunny Nights	Mony	7 episodes

== Theatre ==
=== Actor ===
Year	Title	Role	Notes
1994	Tales of the Pacific	Various	Pacific Underground Theatre
1994	By Degrees	Donna	Auckland Theatre Company
1994	Savage Hearts – Manawa Taua	Various	Theatre at Large
1995	Risky Risque	Baby	BATS Theatre
1995	Nga Pou Wahine	Various	New Zealand Tour
1995	The Maids	Claire	
1995	Five Angels	Carol / Api	Centrepoint Theatre
1996	Waiora	America	New Zealand International Festival of the Arts
1996	Waitapu	Jackie	New Zealand and Canadian Tour
1996	King Lear	Cordelia / Various	Theatre at Large
1997	Waiora	America	New Zealand and UK Tour
1997	Alice in Wonderland	Various	Bruce Mason Centre
1997	Nga Pou Wahine	Various	New Zealand and Sydney – Australia Tour
1998	Beauty and the Beast	Various	New Zealand International Festival of the Arts
2000	Serial Killers	Simone	Circa Theatre
2000	Woman Far Walking	Tiriti	New Zealand International Festival of the Arts
2001	Woman Far Walking	Tiriti	New Zealand and Hawaiian Tour
2002	The World's Wife	Various	New Zealand International Festival of the Arts
2002	The Bellbird	Tapairu	Auckland Theatre Company
2002	South Pacific	Bloody Mary	Court Theatre
2003	Cherish	Maeve	Circa Theatre
2003	An Enemy of the People		Circa Theatre
2003	The World's Wife	Various	New Zealand Tour
2010	The Vagina Monologues	Various	The Basement Theatre
2013	White Rabbit, Red Rabbit	Nassim	Silo Theatre

=== Director ===
Year	Title	Notes
2001	Have Car Will Travel	Taki Rua
2002	Have Car Will Travel	Silo Theatre
2005	The Mercy Seat	Silo Theatre
2005	Hinepau	Capital E National Theatre for Children
2006	Hinepau	Australian Tour
2006–2007	Frangipani Perfume	New Zealand; Brisbane, Australia; Cambridge, UK
2007	Wild Dogs Under My Skirt	Auckland Festival
2009	Flintlock Musket	STAMP at THE EDGE
2010	The Vagina Monologues	The Basement Theatre
2012	The Māori Troilus and Cressida	Globe Theatre
2013	Hui	Auckland Arts Festival and Silo Theatre
2013	Don Ioane	Pacific Institute of Performing Arts
2014	MISS.Understood	Pacific Institute of Performing Arts
2016	Medea	Silo Theatre

== Awards ==
Year	Award	Category	Work	Result
1995	Chapman Tripp Theatre Award	Most Promising Female Newcomer	Nga Pou Wahine	Won
1996	Chapman Tripp Theatre Award	Best Supporting Actress	King Lear	Nominated
2001	Chapman Tripp Theatre Award	Director of the Year	Have Car Will Travel	Won
2001	New Zealand Listener Award	Best Director	Have Car Will Travel	Won
2002	Chapman Tripp Theatre Award	Outstanding Performance	Woman Far Walking	Won
2003	Chapman Tripp Theatre Award	Best Supporting Actress	An Enemy of the People	Won
2008	Prague Film School	Best Director	Bravo	Won
2008	Prague Film School Audience Award	Best Film	New Skirt	Won
2010	Winnipeg Aboriginal Film Festival	Best Supporting Actress	Boy	Won
2012	Chapman Tripp Theatre Award	Director of the Year	The Māori Troilus and Cressida	Won
2012	New Zealand Arts Foundation Laureate Award			Won
2016	WIFT NZ Mana Wāhine Award			Won
2018	Te Waipuna-ā-Rangi Award for Arts and Entertainment	Entertainer of the Year		Won
