= Te Tairāwhiti Arts Festival =

New Zealander annual arts festival

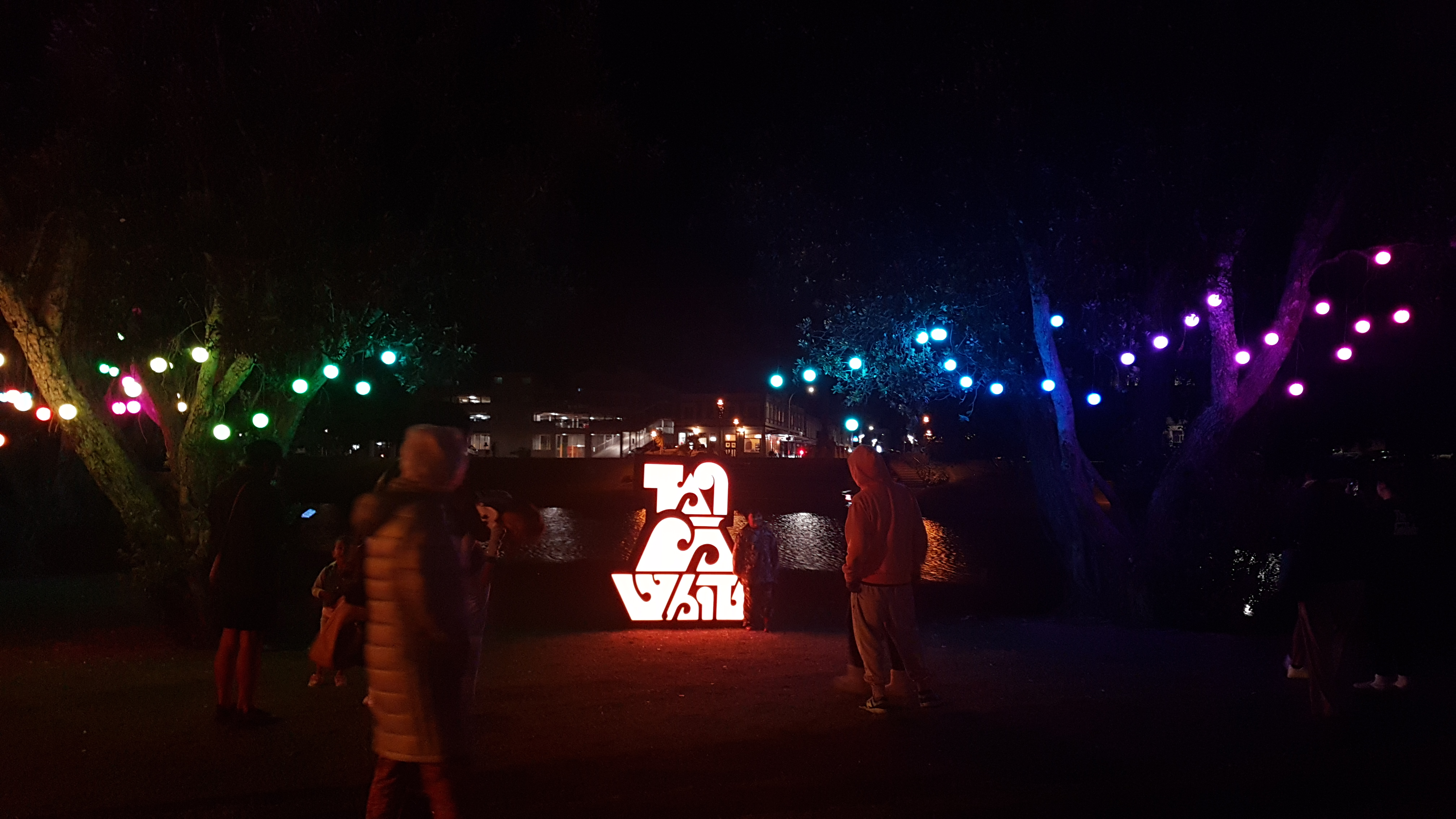
Te Tairāwhiti Arts Festival 2020

Te Tairāwhiti Arts Festival is an annual arts festival held in Gisborne, New Zealand. The festival is about celebrating the 'artistry, talent and storytelling' of the East Coast region.

== Background ==
The chief executive and artistic director is Tama Waipara. Waipara has said of the festival: "Having a place to tell stories that are formed of place is about reinstalling our narratives into the fabric of the landscape".

The first festival was held in 2019 and coincided with Tuia 250. It was launched at an event on 17 July 2019 at Toko Toru Tapu Church of Manutuke, Gisborne. It was launched by Tama Waipara, Teina Moetara and Mere Boynton, with music by Annie Crummer and Te Tira Hapori o Manutuke choir.

The festival is supported by the Trust Tairāwhiti (formerly Eastland Community Trust). In 2020, Te Tairāwhiti Arts Festival received a one off Creative and Cultural Events Incubator investment grant from the New Zealand Government.

== Programme ==
=== 2019 ===
The byline of the inaugural festival was ‘We are of this Place and its People’. True to this was the premiere of the play Witi’s Wāhine starring four women from the region Mere Boynton, Roimata Fox, Ani-Piki Tuari and Ngapaki Moetara, they were being characters from Witi Ihimarea's books drawn from the region. Witi's Wāhine was written and directed by Nancy Brunning (1971–2019) and produced by Tanea Heke (Hapai Productions). The opening outdoor event was Maui Pūtahi directed by Teina Moetara. There was an outdoor concert at Gisborne Soundshell called Under an East Coast Moon, featuring performances by Teeks, Rob Ruha, Maisey Rika, Dave Dobbyn, Anika Moa and Annie Crummer.

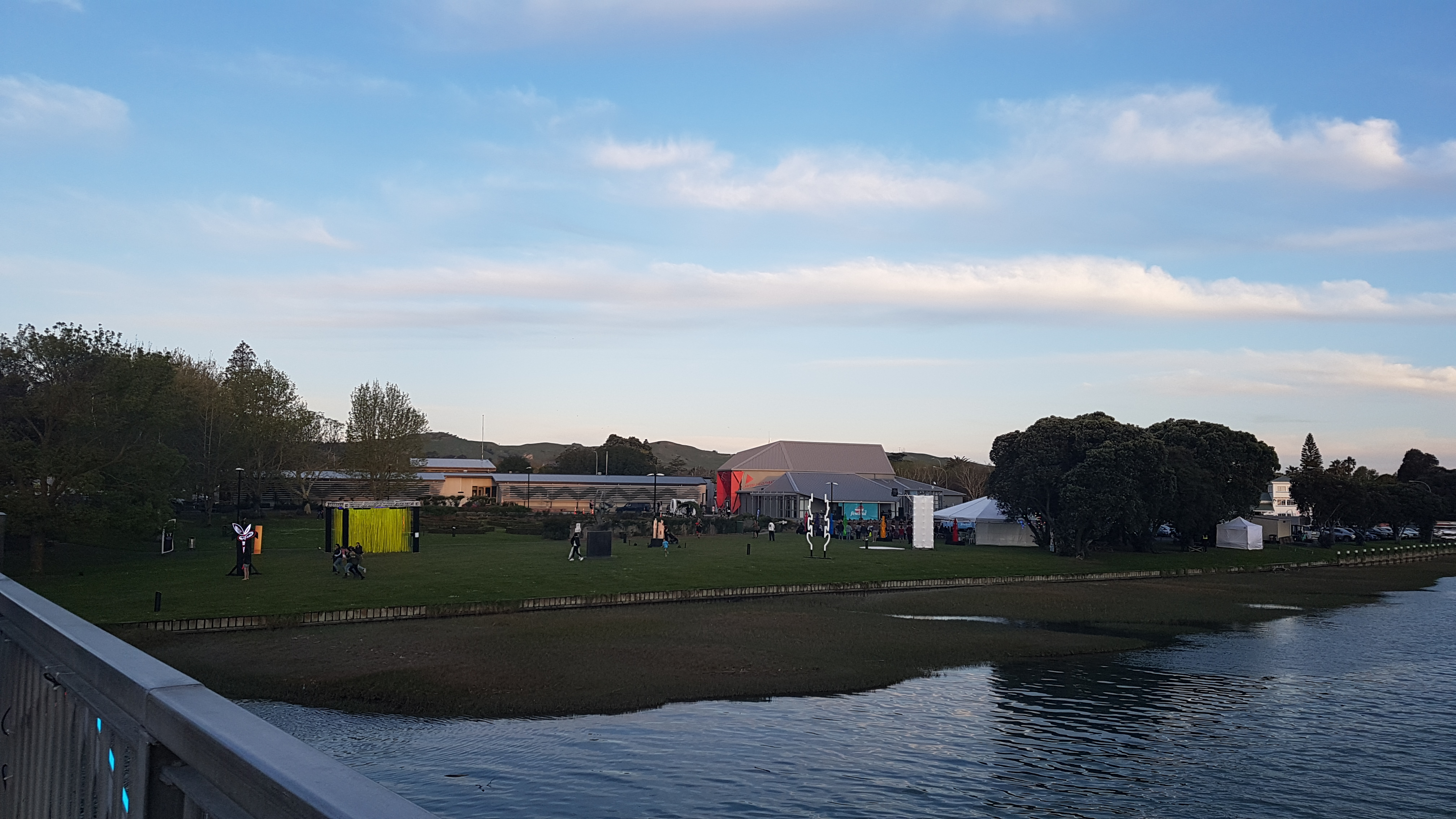
View over the river to the Lawson Field Theatre and the festival hub 2020

=== 2020 ===
The programme in October 2020 was designed to allow involvement from a range of people in Gisborne. The programme included Troll by Trick of the Light Theatre, short films and a youth filmmaking workshop by Maoriland, Reid & Ruins (Nadia Reid and Hollie Fullbrook), Turanga: The Land of Milk and Honey produced by the Rongowhakaata Iwi Trust and Every Brilliant Thing, starring Anapela Polatai’vao produced by Silo Theatre. The festival attracted over 12,000 people with 61% of ticket buyers under the age of 45.

=== 2021 ===
Programmed for 2021 were over 200 artists and performers. Events included Homecoming Queens with Jackie Clarke (MNZM), Sandy Mill and Bronwyn Turei. The free event on the river bank Te Ara i Whiti was repeated from previous years – an exhibition of contemporary Māori art this year curated by Melanie Tangaere Baldwin. It featured art by Chevron Hassett, Erena Koopu, Fiona Collis, Johnny Moetara, Maungarongo (Ron) Tekawa, Steve Gibbs, Taupuruariki (Ariki) Brightwell, Tāwera Tahuri, Terangi Roimata Kutia-Tataurangi and others. The October 2021 programme was split with the spread of the COVID-19 variant Delta in August with some of the programme postponed to February 2022. It included Troy Kingi, Delaney Davidson and Tami Neilson. This was all cancelled late January 2022 with COVID-19 variant Omicron causing New Zealand to go into the red setting of the COVID-19 Protection Framework.

=== 2022 ===
In 2022 the festival presented Te Ara i Whiti, a collecting of art light displays during Matarki for the first time.
