= Waiora Te Ūkaipō - The Homeland =

1996 play by Hone Kouka

- Original language: English, with some te reo Māori
- Written by: Hone Kouka
- Subject: urban migration, connection to land and culture, Māori, whakapapa

Premiere
- Date: 15 March 1996

Waiora Te Ūkaipō - The Homeland is a 1996 play by New Zealand playwright Hone Kouka. The play describes the social dislocation that happens to Māori who leave their tribal lands. It is the first part of a trilogy with Homefires (1998) and The Prophet (2004), and the teenagers of The Prophet are the children of Waiora's Amiria, Rongo and Boyboy.

== History ==
The play was commissioned by the Wellington International Festival of the Arts. Kouka has described the play as about immigrants, writing "unfortunately the immigrants in the play are Māori, displaced in their own country." The play was published by Huia Publishers in 2007 and then by Playmarket in 2019. Kouka says of the play that it is big in scope and 'naturalistic and impressionistic'.

== Characters ==
The Whanau (family)

- John/Hone - the father, late thirties, has always worked outside
- Sue/Wai Te Atatu - the mother, had her children in her teens
- Amiria - 19, eldest daughter, a beauty, thinks of herself as Pākehā
- Rongo - 18, daddy's girl, sings like a tūī, but not since leaving Waiora
- Boyboy - 16, whāngai (adopted), sporty, loves the outdoors

The Guests

- Steve Campbell - Hone's boss, Pākehā, late 30s or early 40s.
- Louise Stones - a secondary school teacher, twenties, Pākehā, outspoken, liberal and not a local
- The Tīpuna (ancestors) - a group of four ancestors, whose focus is Rongo. A metaphor for what has been left behind.
- The Stranger: one of the tīpuna

== Synopsis ==
The play is set on a beach, on the east coast of the South Island in late summer, March, in the year 1965. The Waiora of the title is a fictional place on the East Coast of the North Island. Hone has recently moved his family to the South Island for work in a timber mill. The whanau have gathered on the beach to celebrate Rongo's 18th birthday, and have invited Louise, as Wai's friend and Boyboy's teacher, and Steve as guest of honour. The whanau are expecting Steve to promote Hone (who Steve calls John) to foreman at the mill.

The play opens with the tīpuna walking on the beach, singing of their sadness at leaving their original homeland with the waiata "Taukuri e". Now the place is prepared, the whanau arrive to set up for their celebration. Boyboy is proud to be putting down his first hangi, but in his desperation to please Hone, leaves the fire unattended to collect mussels, and the fire gets out of control.

Louise presses Steve to tell Hone about the promotion, but Steve tells her he has a bonus for Hone, not a promotion. Boyboy overhears, and reveals to the whanau that Steve isn't going to promote Hone because he is Māori and it wouldn't be accepted. Amiria admits that she is going to marry her Pākeha boyfriend and move to Auckland. Rongo retreats and withdraws from the conflict and is later found unresponsive in the water. Through karakia and haka she is brought back from the tīpuna.

== Productions ==
Production	Date	Crew	Cast	Ref
Hannah Playhouse, Wellington, part of the NZ International Festival of the Arts	15–24 March 1996	Director: Murray Lynch Musical director: Laughton Pattrick Stage manager: Anthony Hodgkin Producer: Fenn Gordon Lighting design: Ivan Morundi Set design: John Parker Costume design: John Parker Script advisor: Philippa Campbell Haka & Waiata: Hone Hurihanganui Kaumatua: Bob Wiki	Hone/John: Rawiri Paratene Wai/Sue: Tina Cook Amiria: Rachel House Rongo: Nancy Brunning Boyboy: Jason Te Kare Steve Campbell: Mick Rose Louise Stones: Nicola Murphy Tīpuna: Antonio Te Maioha, Grace Hoet, Karl Kite Rangi, Toni Huata	
Return season to Downstage Theatre, Wellington and a tour to Whakatāne and Auckland	21 April 1997 – 30 April 1997		Helen Pearse-Otene replaced Toni Huata	
Brighton Festival, UK	1997			
Hawai'i, four islands, final performance at Kamehameha School on Oahu	1998			
Regent on Broadway, Palmerston North	10 August 1998 – 15 August 1998			
Court Theatre, Christchurch	25 August 1998 – 5 September 1998	Director: Murray Lynch		
Court Theatre, Christchurch	13 August – 3 September 2016	Writer, director, Sound director: Hone Kouka Stage manager: Jo Bunce Lighting design: Giles Tanner Set design: Mark McEntyre Costume design: Mark McEntyre Sound facilitator/operator: Sean Hawkins Properties Coordinator: Christy Lassen	Hone/John: Taungaroa Emile Wai/Sue: Kim Garrett Amiria: Maia Diamond Rongo: Te Awhina Kaiwai-Wanikau Boyboy: Tola Newbery Steve Campbell: Phil Grieve Louise Stones: Hannah Spedding Tīpuna: Sheree Waitoa, Wiremu Waretini, Jared Hiakita, Tania Gilchrist	
Center for Performing Arts, Illinois State University	30 September – 9 October 2016	Director: Kim Pereira Cultural coaching: Jack Gray and Dakota Alcantara-Camacho Lighting designer: Ethan Hollinger Sound designer: Aaron Paolucci Scene designer: Bridgid Burge Music director: Kristin Maroni	Hone/John: Thomas Russell Wai/Sue: Brandi Jones Amiria: Emilia Dvorak Rongo: Hannah Spohnholtz Boyboy: Alex Levy Steve Campbell: Mac Byrd Louise Stones: Emma Harmon Tīpuna: William Brown, Anastasia Ferguson, Cayla Jones, Chloe Szot The Stranger: Anthony Harden	
Presented by Wahine Works Hannah Playhouse, Wellington, part of the 2018 Kia Mau Festival	Friday 1 June to Saturday 9 June 2018	Director: William Walker Set Design/Construction: Cedric Ruawhare Sound Operator: Aaliyah Nordstrand Technical Stage Manager: Karina Lighting Technician: Tim Bell Lighting Technician: Aaliyah Nordstrand General Manager: Kathy Watson Front of House Administrator: Ruby Harrison	Rongo: Phoenix Karaitiana Hone: Leihana Shelford Wai: Kayah Thompson Amiria: Zahra Cherrington-Irving Boy Boy: Hana Gilbert Steve Campbell: Meg Robinson Louise Stones: Mollie Jacobson Tipuna: Jerome Tamihana Hau-Northcroft as Stranger Tracey Kingi as Nanny Kasey Harder Cortland Pairama Paea Slade Ngarimu Wyatt	
Presented at the Opera House, Wellington in partnership with the Aotearoa New Zealand Festival of the Arts, Te Ahurei Toi o Tamaki Auckland Arts Festival, Auckland Theatre Company and Tawata Productions.	27 February – 1 March 2026	Writer & Director: Hone Kouka, Tawata Productions Composer: Hone Hurihanganui Assistant Director: Hōhepa Waitoa Set Designer: Mark McEntyre Lighting Designer: Natasha James Costume Designer: Cara Louise Waretini Stage Manager: Lauren Fergusson Waiora Production Manager: James Kearney Tawata Productions' Production Manager: Natasha James Producer: Mīria George	John/Hone: Regan Taylor Sue/Wai Te Atatu: Erina Daniels Amiria: Rongopai Tickell Rongo: Tioreore Ngatai-Melbourne Boyboy: Te Mihi Potae Steve Campbell: Ben Ashby Louise Stones: Mycah Keall Tīpuna: Anatonio Te Maioha, Awerangi Thompson, Mathieu Boynton-Rata, Huia Rawiri	

== Critical reception ==
Nancy Brunning remembered a variety of responses to the first productions of Waiora:

"The response to the '96 première of Waiora ranged from standing ovations to heated debates. It brought many Māori together and it angered many Pākehā who were turned off by the portrayal of Pākehā/Māori relationships. Some audiences, Pākehā and Māori alike, took offence at a Māori play daring to say Māori were being treated like immigrants in their own country."

Critic Murray Edmond says "Waiora was the play which gave Hone Kouka a significant presence in New Zealand theatre as a Māori playwright." David O'Donnell considers that the success of plays such as Waiora and Briar Grace-Smith's Purapurawhetū "is partly due to their dynamic fusion of traditional Māori performance traditions with the dramatic structures inherited from European playwriting." The productions at the Brighton Festival and the tour in Hawaii were considered "a great success". Kouka said "Its uniqueness became a highlighted point. Previously we had been in the shadows of New Zealand theatre. From a world viewpoint, it's the other way round." At the Whakatāne performance, the audience replied to the haka with their own.

Sonia Yee, the first Chinese woman graduate of Toi Whakaari, credits Waiora as one of the drama pieces which made her want to go to drama school. Rajeev Verma, part of "Those Indian Guys" in Auckland, also considers Waiora as formative: "I saw this story that was truthful, and it was about people that were relevant to this country. And it had a very clear purpose for our New Zealand community."
