= Jason Te Kare =

Actor, director, playwright in New Zealand

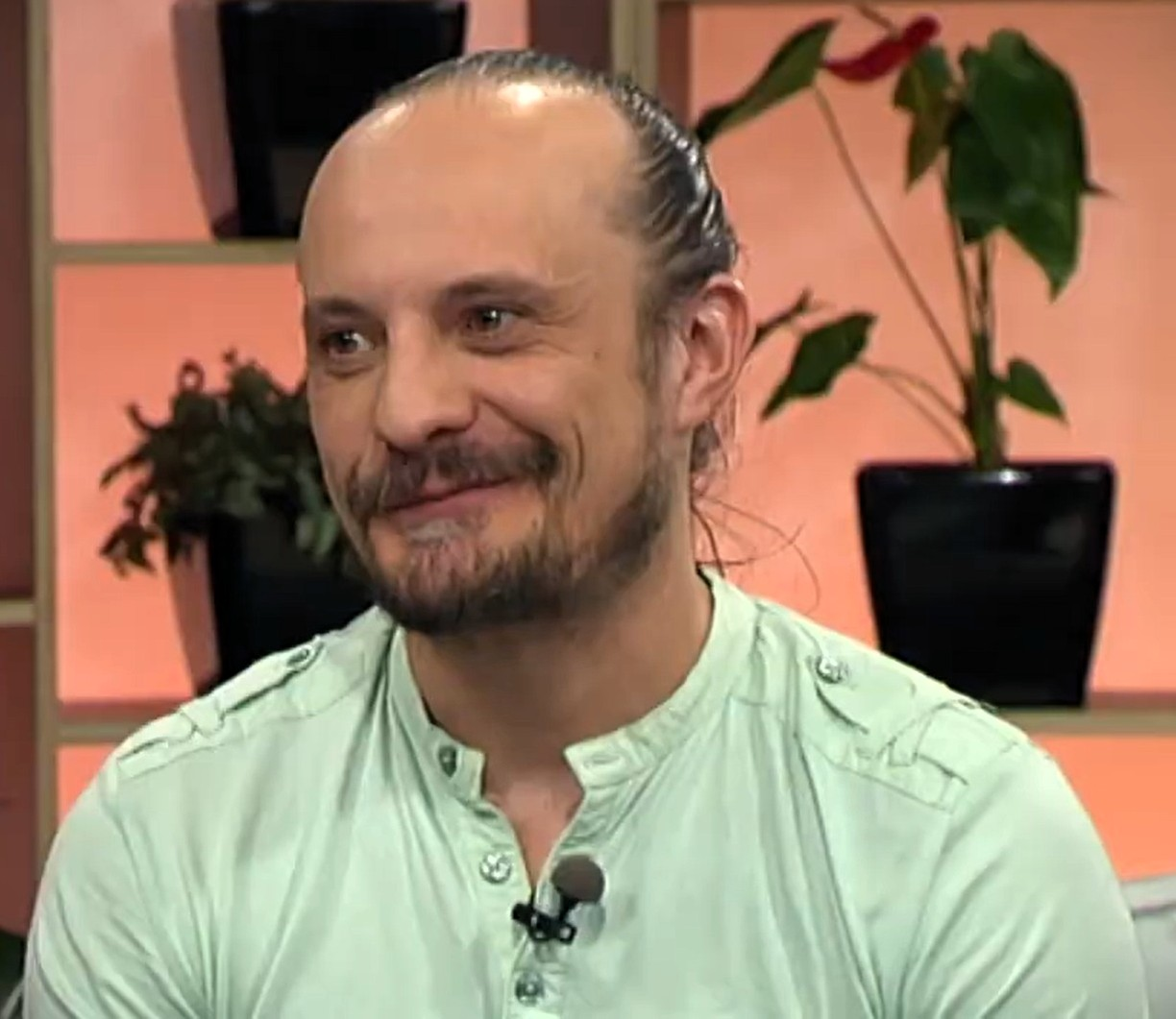
- Te Kare in 2018
- Education: Bachelor of Performing Arts (Acting) from Toi Whakaari: New Zealand Drama School in 2001

Jason Te Kare is a New Zealand director, playwright and actor.

== Early life and education ==
Te Kare graduated from Toi Whakaari: New Zealand Drama School in 2001 with a Bachelor of Performing Arts (Acting).

== Work ==
Te Kare played Ty in the premiere Downstage Theatre production of Hone Kouka's The Prophet in 1994, directed by Nina Nawalowalo.

He made his professional debut as Boyboy in the premiere production of Hone Kouka's play Waiora at the Hannah Playhouse in Wellington in March 1996.

Te Kare co-wrote the play Cellfish with Miriama McDowell and Rob Mokaraka. Cellfish, about a woman teaching Shakespeare in a men's correctional facility, opened the Auckland Arts Festival in 2017, and was nominated for a 2017 Adam New Zealand Play Award. Te Kare directed the production at Q Theatre.

Te Kare played both Theseus and Oberon in the te reo Māori version of A Midsummer Night's Dream at the Pop-up Globe in December 2017 to February 2018.

In November and December 2020, Te Kare and actress Anapela Polataivao played the lead role on alternating nights in Every Brilliant Thing, a play about mental health and suicide. The play was performed at Fale of Samoa House in Auckland. Te Kare co-directed the play with Danielle Cormack who was stuck in Australia due to COVID-19 border restrictions in New Zealand.

As of 2021 Te Kare is on the board of Playmarket. He was a drama producer for Radio New Zealand for ten years.

== Awards and honours ==
Te Kare received the Most Promising Male Newcomer of the Year Award at the Chapman Tripp Theatre Awards in 1996, for Flat Out Brown.

At the Chapman Tripp Theatre Awards in 2011, Te Kare won two awards, the Toi Whakaari: NZ Drama School & Victoria University of Wellington Award for Most Promising Director of the Year, and the Museum Hotel Award for Director of the Year, both for the Hone Kouka play I, George Nepia at Circa Theatre.

In 2018 he was appointed an Artistic Associate at the Silo Theatre, a part-time residency, where he directed a production of Cellfish.

At the Wellington Theatre Awards in 2019, Te Kare received The Grant Tilly Actor of the Year for his performance in Cellfish.
