= Mitch Tawhi Thomas =

New Zealand actor, playwright and teacher

Mitch Tawhi Thomas (born 8 September 1972) is a New Zealand playwright, actor and drama teacher.

== Education ==
Thomas affiliates to Ngāti Maniapoto. Thomas graduated from Toi Whakaari: NZ Drama School in 1997 with a diploma in acting.

== Career ==
Tawhi Thomas is principally a playwright although he has also appeared in a number of plays as an actor to critical acclaim. Shakespearean roles he has played include 'Cobweb' in Midsummers Nights Dream directed by David O'Donnell at the Dell, Wellington Botanic Gardens in 1991, and 'John of Gaunt' in King Richard II directed by David O'Donnell and Rachel Lenart at Studio 77, Victoria University of Wellington in 2009.

In 2010 Mitch worked at Centrepoint Theatre in Palmerston North, running drama workshops with teenagers in the Basement Company over five months writing a play with them called Smashed. In 2021, Mitch is the Senior Acting Tutor at Toi Whakaari. He appeared at the Auckland Writers Festival in 2018.

Tawhi Thomas's play from 2001 Have Car Will Travel depicts "the collision of white trash with brown trash" according to director Rachel House. Tawhi Thomas was appointed writer in residence at Waikato University in 2003. Jangle (2010) had in the cast musician Jhan Lindsay. Critic John Smythe described the play as a "bizarre black comedy", and Pakaru (2019) is described as a "poignant tragedy about our hard-working, hilarious whānau".

Plays
Date	Play title	Venue	Director	Producer	Notes	Ref.
1994	Coupling	BATS Theatre		Wellington Fringe Festival		
1996	Doughboy	BATS Theatre	Rachel House			
2001	Have Car Will Travel	BATS Theatre	Rachel House			
2010	Jangle	BATS Theatre	Mitch Tawhi Thomas			
2010	Smashed	Centrepoint Theatre		Kate Louise Elliott (Centrepoint Theatre)		
2019	Pakaru	BATS Theatre, Kia Mau Festival.	Mitch Tawhi Thomas	Hāpai Productions		

== Awards ==
In 2001 Thomas received The Absolutely Positively Outstanding New New Zealand Play of the Year at the Chapman Tripp Theatre Awards for his thriller Have Car Will Travel. This play also won Best Director for Rachel House in the Chapman Trip Theatre Awards and the New Zealand Listener awards.

In 2002 he was awarded the Bruce Mason Playwriting Award.

Thomas won the Adam New Zealand Play Award in 2012 for Hui. Hui premiered with Silo Theatre at the Auckland Arts Festival in 2013.

His play Pakaru won five awards at the 2019 Wellington Theatre Awards. It premiered at the Kia Mau Festival in 2019. Pakaru also won the Adam New Zealand Play Award, making Thomas the first playwright to win the award twice. Both Hui and Pakaru also won Best Play by a Māori Playwright.

== Published works ==
- Have Car Will Travel (Wellington: Tawata, 2010)
