= The Prophet (play) =

2004 play by Hone Kouka

- Original language: English, with some te reo Māori
- Written by: Hone Kouka
- Subject: teen pregnancy, teen suicide, Māori, leadership

Premiere
- Date: 12 March 2004

The Prophet is a 2004 play by New Zealand playwright Hone Kouka. The play has themes of teenage pregnancy and suicide. It is the third play in the Waiora trilogy of plays. It was first performed at the 2004 New Zealand Festival of the Arts in Wellington. It was published by Playmarket in 2006, and televised as part of the six-part series of Māori plays Atamira in 2012.

== History ==
The inspiration for the play came when playwright Hone Kouka was touring in Gisborne in 1999 with his play Waiora. While he was there a cousin's child committed suicide. The Prophet was his attempt to find out what teenagers would think about this. The cousins are the children of characters from the first play in the trilogy, Waiora: Ty is Mahurangi's son, Laura and Matt are the children of Rongo, Andrew Beautiful is the son of Amiria, and Maia is Boyboy's daughter. The parts Aunty Kay and Laura were written for the actors Tanea Heke and Waimihi Hotere.

== Characters ==
The cousins

- Ty – 20 years old
- Matt – Laura's brother, 18 years old
- Laura – 19 years old, Matt's sister
- Andrew Beautiful – 16 years old
- Maia – 20 years old and mother to a baby boy

And

- Kay – In her early forties, the mother of the boy who committed suicide, and aunt to the cousins
- DJ Ngutu – Waiora's DJ

== Synopsis ==
Five teenage cousins return home for the unveiling of a cousin who committed suicide a year ago. The play takes place over three days and is set on a basketball court. It deals with themes of suicide, teenage pregnancy, and urban and rural Māori.

== Productions ==
Production	Date	Crew	Cast
Studio 77, Victoria University (workshop)	June 2002	Director: Kirk Torrance, Hone Kouka	Ty: Jason Te Kare Laura: Marie Louise Williams Maia: Miriama McDowell Matt: Jarod Rawiri Andrew Beautiful: Mark Ruka Aunty Kay: Waimihi Hotere
Downstage Theatre, Wellington (premiere)	12 March 2004 – 21 March 2004	Director: Nina Nawalowalo Dramaturg: Catherine Fitzgerald Kaumātua: Enoka Waitoa Set designer: Ross Gibbs Sound designer: Warryn Maxwell Lighting designer: Jennifer Lal Waiata: Hone Hurihanganui	Ty: Jason Te Kare Maia: Miriama McDowell Matt: Jarrod Rawiri Andrew Beautiful: Mark Ruka Laura: Maria Walker Kay: Tanea Heke DJ Ngutu: Mark Wagner
Maidment Theatre, Auckland	26 March 2004 – 3 April 2004		
Hawai'i, Tawata Productions	17 Oct 2006 – 31 Oct 2006		Jarod Rawiri Waimihi Hotere Taungaroa Emile Andrew Beautiful Miriama McDowell

The play was televised as the last part in the six-episode series of Māori plays, Atamira. The episode aired on Māori TV on Sunday, 27 May 2012 at 8.30pm. The cast included Tola Newbery, Matariki Whatarau, Juanita Hepi, Cian White, Scott Cotter, and Waimihi Hotere.
