= Sue Paterson =

New Zealand theatre and festival director

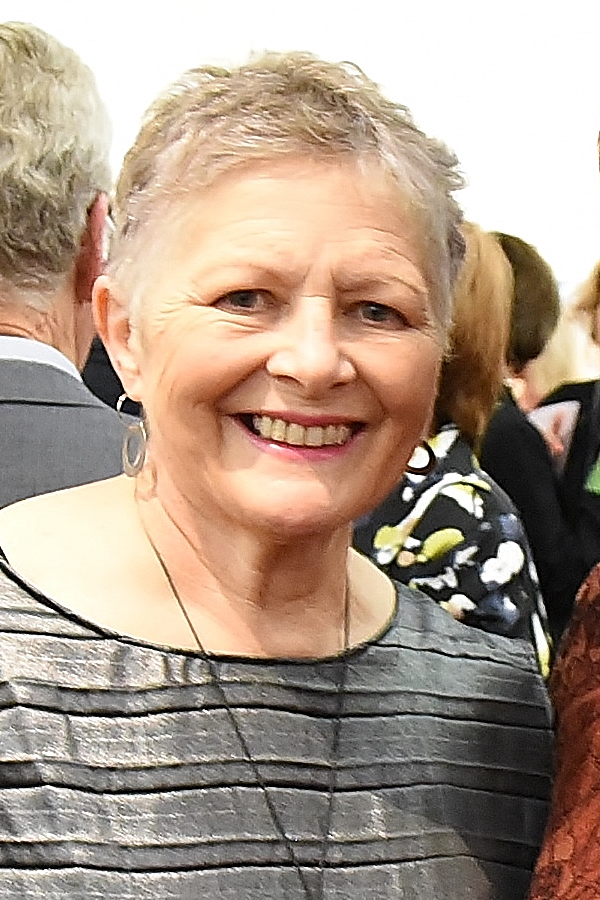
Sue Paterson

Sue Paterson ONZM (1953–2018) was a New Zealand theatre and festival director. In 2017 she was named Senior New Zealander of the Year.

== Biography ==
Paterson was born in Wellington, New Zealand. Her father was a marine engineer from Aberdeen, Scotland, and her mother was a hotel administrator. She studied journalism at Wellington Polytechnic in the early 1970s, with Michael King and Christine Cole Catley as tutors. Her first position in the arts industry was as an administrator at the Australian Elizabethan Theatre Trust.

From 1979 to 1986, Paterson was general manager of Limbs Dance Company. She was marketing director of the biennial New Zealand Festival from 1994 to 1998, moved to the Royal New Zealand Ballet, where she was general manager from 1999 to 2006. In 2009 she went back to the New Zealand Festival and was executive director from 2009 which included the Wellington Jazz Festival.

=== Recognition ===
In 2004, Paterson was made an officer of the New Zealand Order of Merit for services to ballet. In 2017 she was named Senior New Zealander of the Year in recognition of her 40 years of service to arts and culture.
