= Silo Theatre =

Contemporary theatre in New Zealand

Silo Theatre is a theatre production company based in Auckland, New Zealand established in 1997. In 2024 Silo Theatre's director was Sophie Roberts. Silo Theatre has produced plays featuring many well-known New Zealand creative people including Toa Fraser, Tusiata Avia, Rachel House and Chris Parker.

== Background ==
Silo Theatre started out as a 'boutique underground theatre' in a venue off Queen Street in central Auckland in 1997. Silo moved out in 2007 and this venue is now the home of The Basement Theatre.

Shane Bosher was director from 2001 - 2013, while he was there he also directed over 12 productions. Some of the works programmed in this time include playwrights Neil Labute, Caryl Churchill, Patrick Marber, Bertolt Brecht, Samuel Beckett, and New Zealand authors Toa Fraser, Jodie Molloy and Jackie Van Beek. Whilst at Silo, Bosher was an 'Aucklander of 2005' and in 2007 included in the 'Most Influential People Under 40' list both by Auckland-based Metro magazine. Sophie Roberts was appointed artistic director in 2014.

Staff have included Jessica Smith (executive director) and Ahi Karunaharan (Associate Artistic Director).

Silo Theatre produces an annual season of local and international work their work is presented in venues and spaces across Auckland, New Zealand and sometimes overseas. Their purpose is stated to:

- Encourage the pursuit of excellence in Aotearoa New Zealand's arts practitioners and stage craft
- Foster greater inclusion and representation in storytelling and invigorate diverse audiences
- Contribute to, and develop, the arts and the culture landscape of Tāmaki Makaurau and Aotearoa

== Programming ==
Some of the notable productions produced by Silo Theatre include Bare by Toa Fraser (1998) and Wild Dogs Under My Skirt by Tusiata Avia (2019), a co-production by Auckland Arts Festival. In 2021 part of their programme for Matariki was a participatory audio play, Mauri Tau, written and directed by Scotty Cotter featuring Nicola Kāwana, Rachel House, Tanea Heke and Te Kohe Tuhaka. This production came as a result of COVID-19 effects on creating live stage productions. Cotter collaborated with sound designers Fran Kora, Matt Eller, and Komako Silver for this streamed event.

In 2015 Silo produced Hudson & Halls Live! a play about New Zealand TV cooks and personalities Peter Hudson and David Halls. It premiered at the Herald Theatre, Auckland and was directed by Kip Chapman starring Todd Emerson, Chris Parker and Jackie van Beek. Silo's development series Working Titles in 2017 included Modern Girls in Bed by Alex Lodge and Cherie Jacobson, The Defendant by Dan Musgrove and Burn Her by Sam Brooks.

Every Brilliant Thing by Duncan Macmillan with Jonny Donahoe was a solo play in 2020 about suicide and mental health that had two leads that alternated each night, Jason Te Kare and Anapela Polata’ivao.

Words from Pacific Island poets was curated into a Silo production called UPU, created by Grace Iwashita-Taylor and directed by Fasitua Amosa. It premiered at the Auckland Arts Festival and then was presented at the Kia Mau Festival in Wellington in 2021.

Other events that Silo host include talks such as the one off Once in a Black Moon in 2022 created in partnership with Black Creatives Aotearoa with panelists Adorate Mizero, Keagan Carr Fransch, Michelle Mascoll Michelle Mascoll and Vira Paky. This was to accompany the play seven methods of killing kylie jenner by Jasmine Lee-Jones at the Basement Theatre.

The 2022 Silo production of The First Prime-Time Asian Sitcom, was the theatre debut of writer Nahyeon Lee presented at Q-Theatre and directed by Ahi Karunaharan. The play is a commentary on Asian representation in New Zealand. Lee, who is of Korean heritage, said of the play that it questions, "how we define ourselves in a system that doesn’t always have our best interests in mind, but has never predominately had Asian diaspora interests in mind until now". Reviewer Jess Karamjeet encouraged people to see it if, "you want to understand what it feels like to have none of the answers, and all of the rage."

Sophie Roberts, the director, announced for 2023 that Silo Theatre would not stage any shows to focus on development of three plays and in a response to the effects of the COVID-19 pandemic on the theatre company and the industry in Auckland and New Zealand. A full programme was announced for 2024. Four plays were programmed in 2024, ScatterGun: After the Death of Rūaumoko created and performed by Ana Chaya Scotney, Scenes from the Climate Era by David Finnigan, A Slow Burlesque created and performed by Freya Silas Finch, and Camping created and performed by Chris Parker and Tom Sainsbury with Kura Forrester and Brynley Stent.
