= Mā =

New Zealand singer-songwriter and musician

Maarire Brunning-Kouka, known professionally as Mā (stylised in all-caps), is a New Zealand singer-songwriter based in Wellington. Her music combines soul, hip-hop and the Māori language, and has been described as "casual in the extreme, downtempo and welcoming". She released her debut album Breakfast with Hades in August 2021 to critical acclaim.

Mā was named as one of the "NZ Ones To Watch" by American music magazine Rolling Stone in May 2023. She has also performed as "Mā and the Flying Hunnies" or for her side project Iti Bubba, for which she released the album Idiot Check in 2023.

== Personal life ==
Brunning-Kouka is Māori, the daughter of the late Nancy Brunning (1971–2019), an actress, director and playwright, and Hone Kouka, also an award-winning playwright. She descends from Ngāti Raukawa on both sides of her family, as well as Ngāti Porou, Ngāti Kahungunu and Tūhoe. An only child, she grew up as a self-described "theatre kid" due to her parents' work. Her mother played the role of Jaki Manu on Shortland Street.

As a young person Brunning-Kouka struggled with mental health issues, some of which have involved the premature death of her mother, who strongly supported her. In a 2022 interview with RNZ she recalled how after discovering that Brunning-Kouka was experiencing suicide ideation, her mother made her write down and organise the plans for her tangi and for her outstanding rent in a successful attempt to dissuade her.

Brunning-Kouka moved to Nelson around the time she wrote the song 'Skin to Callus', off Breakfast with Hades, where she first worked as a kaitiaki for Ngāti Toarangatira there. She has also worked in theatre sound design.

Outside of music, she works as a biodiversity ranger.

== Career ==
Mā released her debut album Breakfast with Hades on 2 August 2021. Thematically, it discusses different moods in her life since the death of her mother, Māori literature, and culture. The opening track, "Dreamswimmer", was named after the book by Witi Ihimaera, and was about insomnia after her mother's death. The album released critical acclaim. The Spinoff praised Mā's "immersive soundscapes... Mā puts us amongst the awa and ngahere and it's an honour to be welcomed into her world", and compared her to Solange, Ladi6, and Erykah Badu. RNZ described it as "heartfelt, accomplished, packed with groove, and [it] just might be a concept album".

Mā first performed all her songs from the album for the first time at Camo Festival.

In 2024, Mā released an all-Māori single titled "Pūhā me te Porohewa" to celebrate the 5th anniversary of the Waiata / Anthems project.

In 2026, she was named a finalist for the Taite Music Prize for her second album, Blame it on the Weather. The award is set to be announced on 29 April 2026.
