= Ahi Karunaharan =

New Zealand actor and playwright

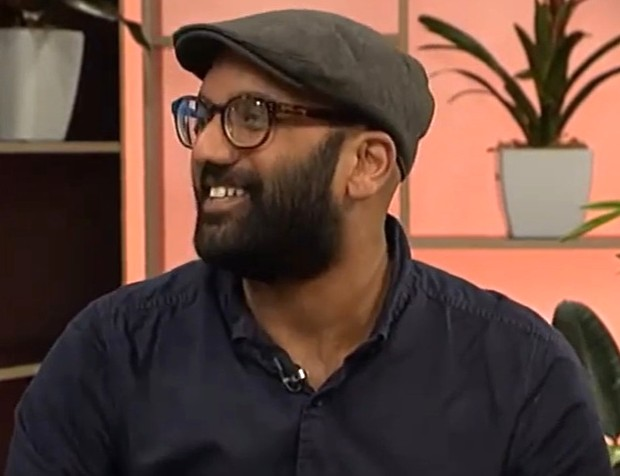
Karunaharan in 2017

Ahilan Karunaharan is writer, director, actor and producer of Sri Lankan descent from New Zealand. He is a recipient of the New Zealand Arts Laureate Award.

== Background and Education ==
Ahi Karunaharan was born in the United Kingdom and raised in Sri Lanka and New Zealand. His family is from Sri Lanka, they moved to the Wellington suburb of Newlands in New Zealand in 1990. He is a graduate from Victoria University of Wellington and Toi Whakaari: New Zealand Drama School. He graduated from Toi Whakaari with a Bachelor of Performing Arts (Acting) in 2007.

== Career ==
Karunaharan is a theatre-maker. He acts, writes, directs and produces. He founded the theatre company Agaram Productions, which curated and produced the first ever South Asian Writers Festival, Karunaharan is the artistic director of Agaram Productions. He has worked as an associate producer for Tawata Productions, and been a member of Prayas Theatre since 2011, a South Asian theatre and cultural group based in Auckland.

Other theatre organisations Karunaharan has worked with include Tara Arts, Belvoir St Theatre, Sydney Festival, Adelaide Festival and Silo Theatre.

Karunaharan talks about the importance of writing and identity:

"We moved here to New Zealand because of the Civil War that broke out in my home country. Our libraries back home were burnt down and much of our literature gone forever. Since moving here, I have always believed that writing was important, it was important for our national identity as we were denied ours."

His writing credits include The Mourning After, Anchorite, Swabhoomi: Borrowed Earth and Tea which premiered at the Auckland Arts Festival 2018 winning best Overall Production at the Auckland Theatre Awards.

Karunaharan has mentored for the Proudly Asian Theatre's Fresh Off the Page series and the Film Commission's New Asian Writers initiative, working with emerging artists. In 2019 he took part in Satellites, a series of public events and encounters showcasing contemporary Asian artists in Auckland. For Satellites he created Kollywood Extra, an immersive event at Sandringham Reserve.

My Heart Goes Thadak Thadak was commissioned by Silo Theatre and premiered in 2019. It was written over two years by Karunaharan, and celebrates the communal spirit and ritual of making art in India. He also directed and it is described as an immersive experience and received positive reviews. "The script is light and brilliantly performed, with the fourth wall being broken quite a few times! "

When asked in an interview to give advice to his younger self some of the things he said are: "Know your artistic whakapapa. Don't try to please everyone. Know what you're saying, who you're saying it to and what you want them to feel."

=== Influences ===
Aki Karunaharan has named the writer Briar Grace-Smith and her play Purapurawhetu starring Nancy Brunning as an influence. Also Apirana Taylor's Whaea Kairau: Mother Hundred Eater which he saw at Otago Museum, and actors Taungaroa Emile and Jarod Rawiri who he had seen in The Prophet by Hone Kouka. Other influences include the 1975 Indian action-adventure Sholay, the films of Mani Ratnam, K. Balachander and Bharathi raja, the music of Ilaiyaraja and A.R Rahman and groups like The Beatles and psychedelic Indian trance.

== Credits ==
=== Writing ===
The Mourning After - The first full-length Sri Lankan play in New Zealand, about life in Sri Lanka after the 2004 Boxing Day tsunami.

Anchorite

Light Vs Dark: The Adventures of Rama

Melodic Maladies

Swabhoomi: Borrowed Earth and Tea

Tea (2018) - Auckland Arts Festival. A play written, produced and designed in Auckland with an entirely South Asian cast of local actors about a tea plantation in Sri Lanka.

My Heart Goes Thadak Thadak. Silo Theatre – a play set in 1970s Bombay, and a collision of East and West, with themes of representation, modernity and tradition.

Akira and the Bollywood Gang Aaja Nachale – a play with dance for young actors about finding courage, your voice, and dancing to your own beat.

Sitaare Aaja Nachale – a dance drama for young audiences about space, stars and dreaming big.

The Mourning After SquareSumsandCo – an excavation and reimagined interrogation of Ahi Karunaharan's first play.

=== Directing ===
The Mourning After for Agaram Productions and SumSquare&Co (Kia Mau Festival).

Romeo and Jules for Ugly Shakespeare Theatre Company.

Othello for Ugly Shakespeare Theatre Company.

A Fine Balance for Prayas Theatre and Auckland Theatre Company (ATC). Based on a book by Parsi writer Rohinton Mistry.

Should Woulda Coulda for Auckland Theatre Company. Here and Now Youth Festival.

Samaroh – The Great Indian Carnival for Auckland Arts Festival

Swabhoomi: Borrowed Earth, for Prayas Theatre – tells the story of Indian settlement in New Zealand

My Heart Goes Thadak Thadak, Silo Theatre

Thali for Auckland Fringe Festival

Rudali-The Mourner for Prayas Theatre

Northern Glow for Basement Theatre

First Word Problems for Basement Theatre

Smoky Quartz Does Turkish for Basement Theatre

Kollywood Extra for Satellites

Light Vs Dark: The Adventures of Rama for ATC at Auckland Live

=== Acting ===
The Mourning After - Karunaharan's solo show

2011 Kingdom of Cards Prayas Theatre

2014 A Thousand Hills House of Hudson

2017 The Night Mechanics Tawata Productions

2019 Counting and Cracking Belvoir St Theatre's, Sydney Arts Festival

=== Producing ===
2020 Yatra - For Prayas Theatre

2019 First World Problems For Agaram Productions

2018 Dara For Prayas Theatre

=== Appearances ===
2020 Auckland Writers Festival, Schools Programme. Featured writer.

2020 Dark Magic. Auckland Arts Festival. Panelist.

2019 Literally Lorne. Auckland Writers Festival. Writer

== Awards ==
2020 Arts Laureate Award – The Arts Foundation

2019 Excellence in Leadership – Auckland Theatre Award.

2018 Bruce Mason Playwriting Award – winner

2018 Best Overall Production – Auckland Theatre Awards, Tea Auckland Arts Festival

2017 Best Ensemble - Auckland Theatre Awards - Swabhoomi: Borrowed Earth
