= Mere Boynton =

New Zealand singer (born 1966)

- Born: Mere Tokorahi Boynton; 1966 (age 59–60); Puha
- Occupations: singer, actor, arts producer
- Years active: 1980s–present
- Notable work: Once Were Warriors; The Piano; The Dead Lands; Director Ngā Toi Māori / programmer - Tawhiri

Mere Tokorahi Boynton (born 1966) is a New Zealand singer, producer and actor. As an actor she is known for her role as Mavis in the film Once Were Warriors. Boynton was Director Ngā Toi Māori for the Aotearoa Festival.

== Early life and education ==
Boynton affiliates to the Te Aitanga a Mahaki, Ngāti Oneone and Ngāi Tūhoe iwi. She grew up in Te Tairāwhiti, she was born in Puha in 1966, and went to Whatatutu Primary School and Te Karaka Primary School and then on to Waikohu College.

Boynton trained in singing at the Conservatorium of Music, Wellington Polytechnic and Māori Studies at Victoria University of Wellington.

== Performance work ==
Boynton has had a range of performing roles as a singer and actor. Boynton played Mavis in the film Once Were Warriors. In 2001 Mere performed in concerts as a member of the New Zealand Prime Minister's cultural entourage to South America. In Tanemahuta Gray's 2006 stage production Maui One Man Against the Gods Boynton was the lead role, Taranga.

Boynton sang Gareth Farr's Te Papa, for the opening of the Museum of New Zealand Te Papa Tongarewa. She toured New Zealand in Michael Parmenter's dance opera Jerusalem and was in a te reo Māori version of The Merchant of Venice, Te Tangata Whairawa o Weneti.

In 2019, Boynton appeared in the premiere of Witi Ihimaera's show Witi's Wahine at the Tairawhiti Arts Festival. In July 2021, Boynton was a soloist for the premiere of Matariki, composed by Gareth Farr and for which Boynton and Ariana Tikao wrote the words. Matariki was performed by the NZSO in Auckland and Wellington, and was conducted by Gemma New.

=== Composer ===
Boynton and Jonathan Besser have composed several pieces of music together including A Soft Peace, for voice and chamber ensemble, Hau (reimagined), for voice and glass, and I Sleep but My Heart Waketh, for voice and chamber ensemble.

== Arts producing ==
Boynton has been in the role of community development at the Wellington City Council, visitor developer at Te Papa, the national museum of New Zealand, and programme manager at Taki Rua Theatre.

Boynton was appointed as Director Ngā Toi Māori for the New Zealand events organisation Tāwhiri in September 2020. Tāwhiri organises events in Wellington including the biennial New Zealand Festival of the Arts, Wellington Jazz Festival and the Lexus Song Quest. Boynton's appointment heralded a change for the arts festival to have half the content be Māori or indigenous.

Boynton was part of the team that programmed the new Wellington Māori language festival, Te Hui Ahurei Reo Māori o Te Whanganui a Tara. The inaugural festival was held in 2022 to mark the 50th anniversary of the Maori Language petition being presented to Parliament. Boynton left Tāwhiri in 2024.
