= Kia Mau Festival =

Performing arts festival in New Zealand

Kia Mau
- Genre: Māori, Pasifika and indigenous performing arts
- Frequency: annual until 2018, now biennial
- Location: Wellington region
- Country: New Zealand
- Established: 2015
- Website: https://kiamaufestival.org/

The Kia Mau Festival, previously called Ahi Kaa Festival, is a biennial performing arts festival in Wellington, New Zealand. In te reo Māori, kia mau is "a call to stay - an invitation to join us".

The festival covers Māori, Pasifika and Indigenous performing arts, including comedy, music, dance and theatre, across a variety of venues around the Wellington area.

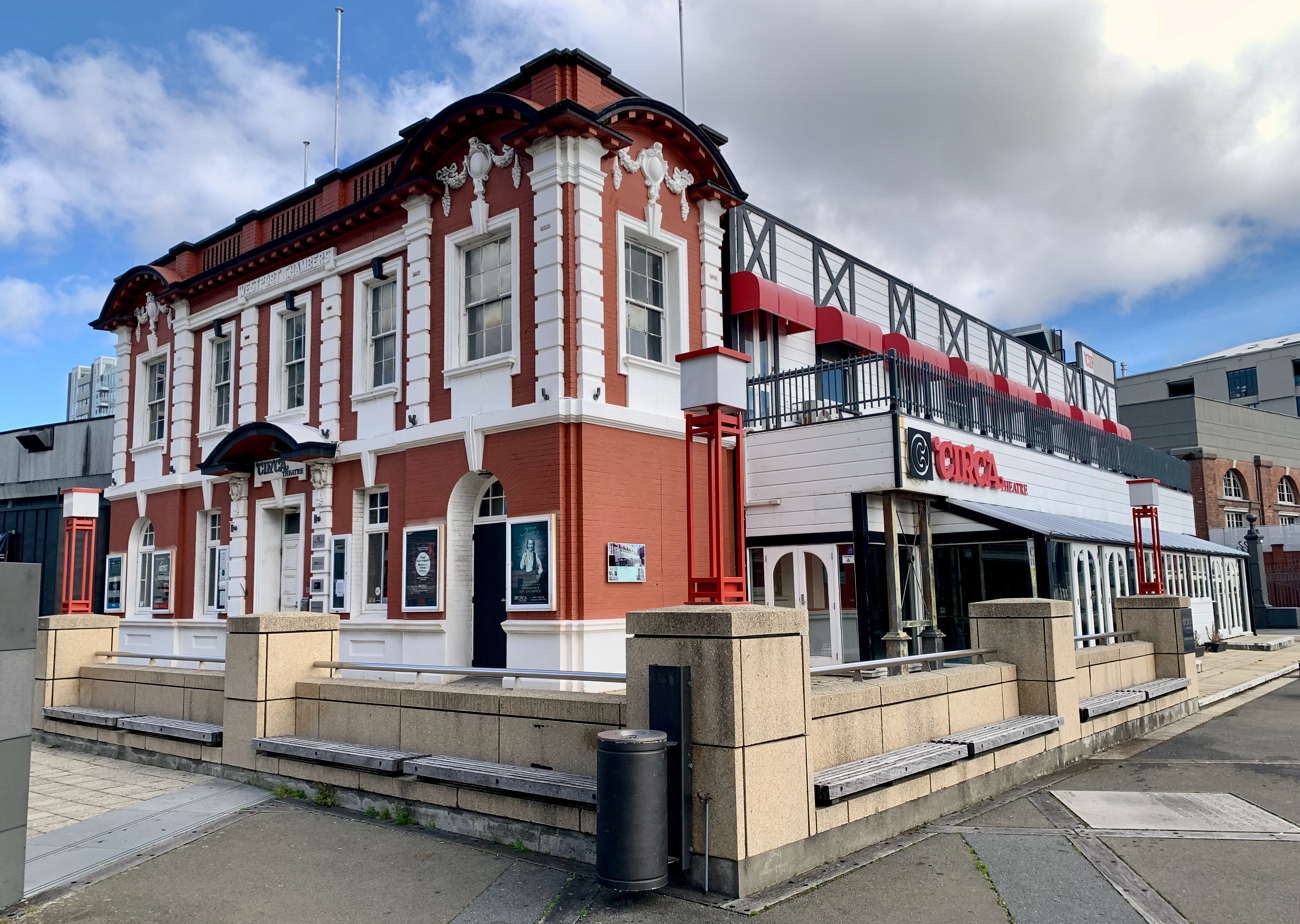
Circa Theatre, Wellington

== Background ==
The Kia Mau Festival was founded by playwright Hone Kouka. The inaugural festival was in 2015, and it was held annually until 2019. Background to the Kia Mau festival was the production company Tawata with Kouka and another playwright Mīria George at the helm creating the Matariki Development Festival in 2010 at Circa Theatre. This was a festival for 'new writing for the stage by Māori' which was held at the same time as an annual Tawata play was presented. Tawata had also organised a meeting about 'Māori Theatre' at Downstage Theatre in 2006, at this was a panel discussion chaired by Alice Te Punga-Somerville who asked, "Describe the last play your wrote and how it fits into Māori theatre?" In 2008 the Māori theatre discussions continued, now called Matariki Playwrights and included an address by Rore Hapipi / Rowley Habib that was published in the Playmarket Annual where he talks about forming the theatre company Te Ika a Maui Players in 1976 because of his experiences in the protest land march of 1975. The Kia Mau Festival programmed a tribute to Hapipi after he died in 2016.

The Matariki festival developed over time to include presentations of plays as well as workshops with playwrights and hūi / meetings about Māori theatre. In 2010 and 2011 the Matariki Development Festival hosted First Nation writer, director and dramaturg Yvette Nolan from Canada. In 2014 the festival included productions of plays and included Hīkoi by Nancy Brunning and 2080 by Aroha White being staged alongside rehearsed performances of Bless the Child by Hone Kouka and Ships by Moana Ete. The Matariki Development Season in 2014 was two weeks in duration. Tanea Heke and Mitch Tawhi Thomas summarising their thoughts about the Kia Mau Festival in 2019 articulated that the struggles and environment is the same through the work in the festival but it is different in the various works and how this creates a collective voice that was apparent from an indigenous artists' perspective.

As well as Māori and Pasifika led performances the festival has grown to include international artists, 'including indigenous and First Nations people from Canada, Hawai’i and Australia'.

As Māori, we are kaitiaki and one of the ways that we look at that is to create spaces for voices and communities you don’t hear, so we’ve also had Sri Lankan Tamil works, Cambodian works, works from Laos coming through as well. (Hone Kouka 2023)

The Kia Mau Festival leadership team is Dolina Wehipeihana, Mīria George and Hone Kouka.

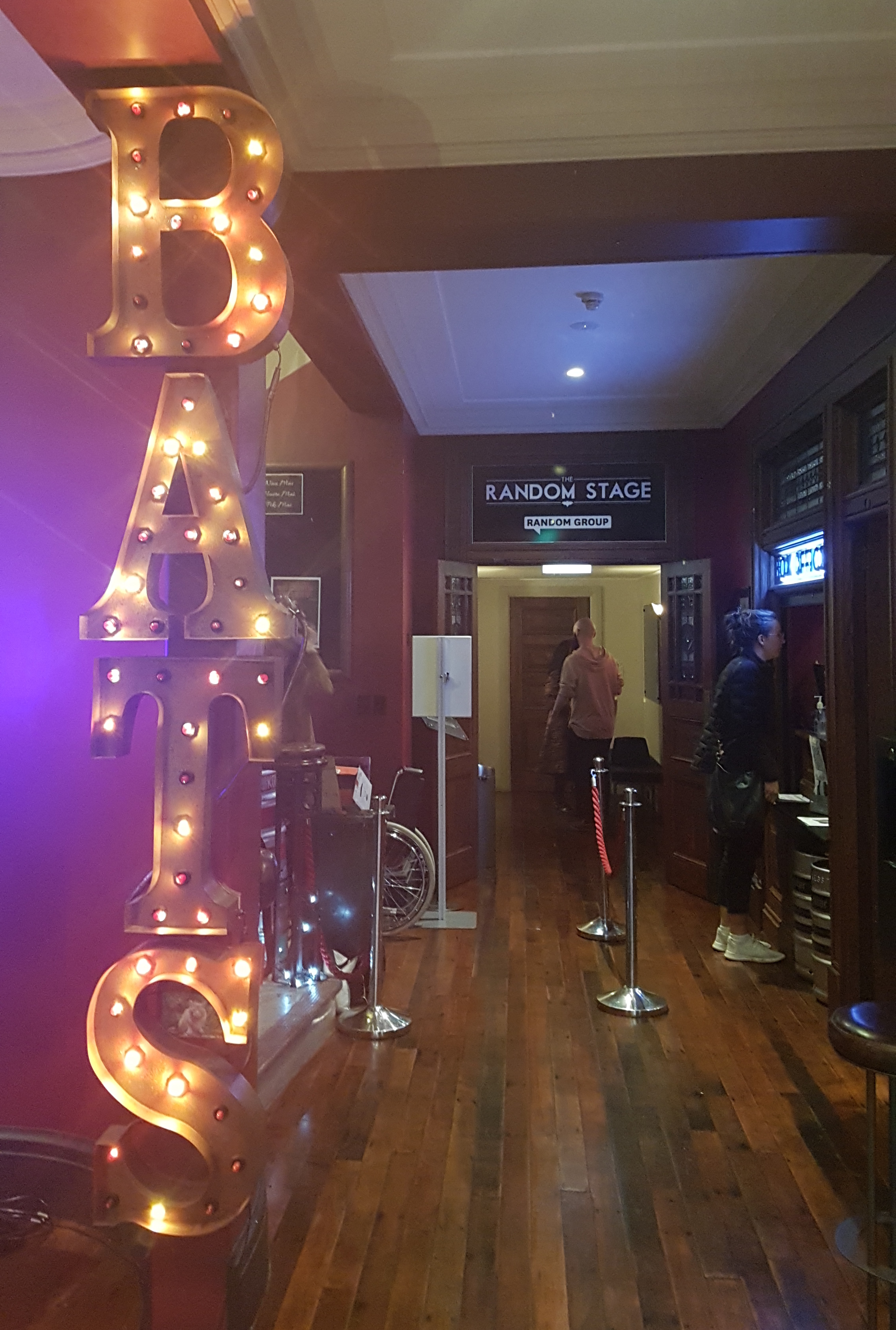
BATS Theatre

== 2015 Festival ==
The first Ahi Kaa Festival featured six productions over three weeks, by six Māori companies: White Face Crew, Tawata Productions, Hāpai Productions, Modern Māori Quartet, Taki Rua Productions and Tikapa Productions. Circa Theatre was again a venue alongside BATS Theatre, the Hannah Playhouse and Soundings Theatre in Te Papa. Productions included Manny Pacquiao of Timberlea by Natano Keni and The Beautiful Ones by Hone Kouka.

== 2016 Festival ==
The 2016 Kia Mau Festival ran from 7–25 June and included eight productions across three weeks. Performances included Versions of Allah by Ohokomo, The Vultures by Tawata Productions, Shot Bro by Mookalucky Productions, Tiki Tour by Hāpai Productions, Solothello by Te Rehia Theatre Company, La Vie dans une Marionette by Whiteface Crew, Whakaahuatia Mai by Taki Rua Productions, and Mana Wahine by Okareka Dance Company. Venues included BATS Theatre, Circa Theatre, and Te Papa.

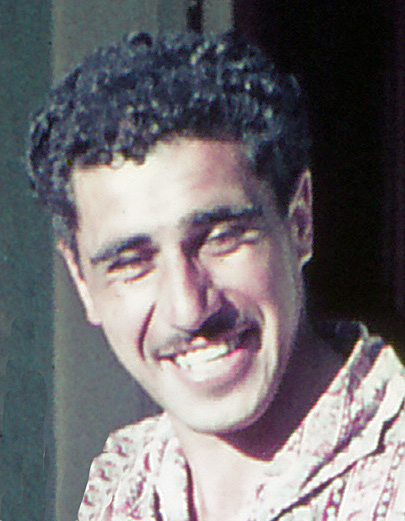
Rore Hapipi / Rowley Habib 1969

== 2017 Festival ==
The 2017 Kia Mau Festival ran from 2–24 June, and included a tribute to playwright Rore Hapipi, who died in 2016, called Portrait of an Artist Mongrel produced by Hāpai Productions (Nancy Brunning and Tanea Heke) that included theatre artists old, Jim Moriarty, Mitch Tawhi Thomas and young, Trae Te Wiki and Moana Ete.

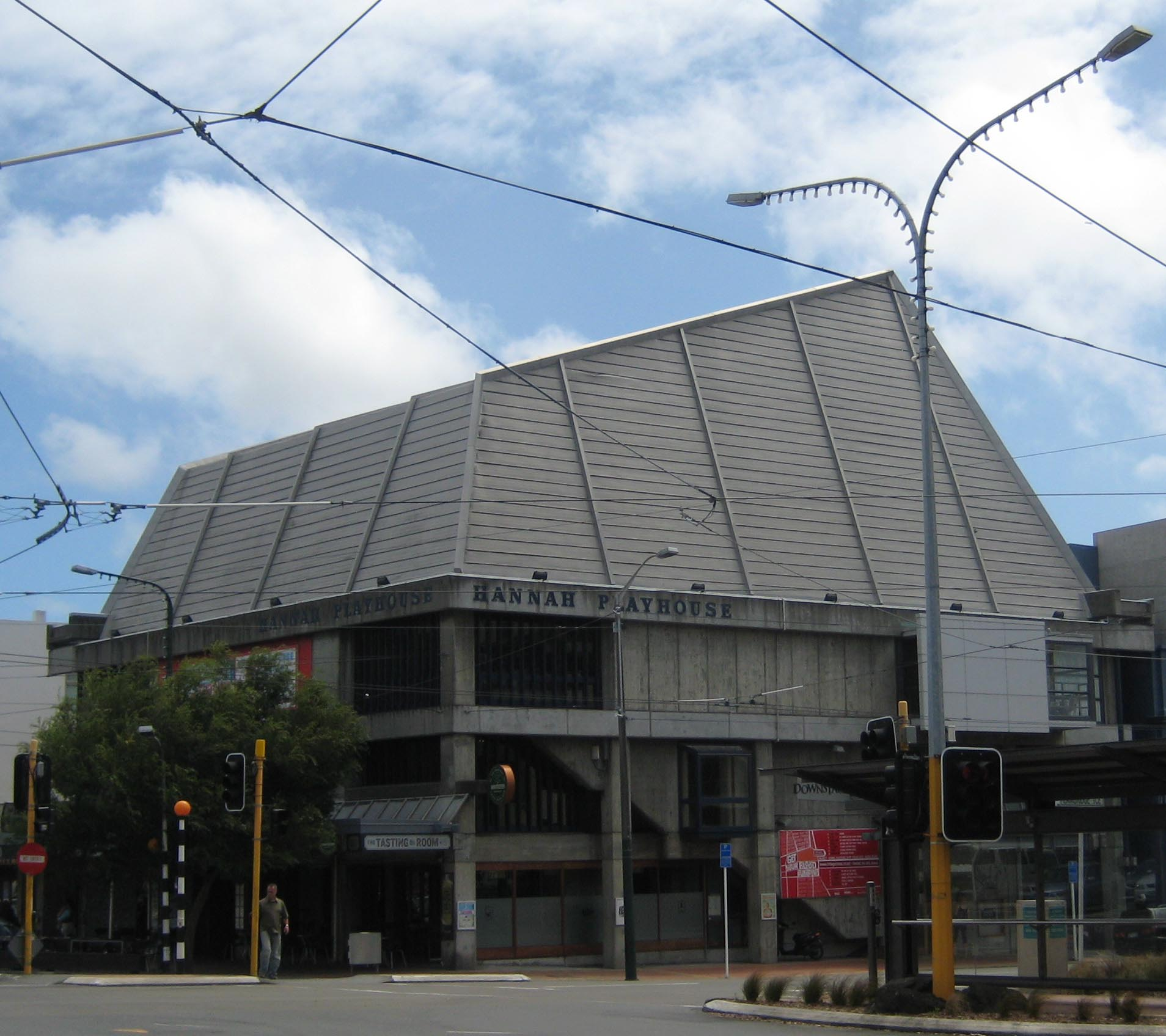
The Hannah Playhouse / Downstage Theatre

== 2018 Festival ==
The 2018 Kia Mau festival was held 1–16 June. It included an all-female production of Hone Kouka's play Waiora – The Homeland by Wahine Works at the Hannah Playhouse.

== 2019 Festival ==
At the 2019 Kia Mau Festival was Pakarū written by Mitch Tawhi Thomas about a solo mum raising teenagers in New Zealand produced by Hāpai Productions.

== 2021 Festival ==
The 2021 festival, from 4–19 June, featured more than 100 events across three weekends. Highlights included the world premieres of All I See by Cian Parker, and Daughter by Teremoana Rapley. There was also a production of The Mourning After, written and directed by Ahi Karunaharan. Nancy Brunning who died in 2019, had her last work presented which is her play Witi’s Wāhine, a tribute to the women in the writing of well-known Māori author Witi Ihimaera.

== 2023 Festival ==
Some of the performances in the 2023 festival are Flames a hiphop musical by Reon Bell, Roy Iro and Sean Rivera, O le Pepelo, Le Gaoi Ma Le Pala’ai – The Liar, the Thief and the Coward co-written by Natano Keni and Sarita So. At the Michael Fowler Centre was Avaiki Nui Social, about the string band music of the Cook Islands that go back to the 1940s. The concert featured musicians from across the 15 islands of the Cook Islands.

At the Hannah Playhouse was Arawhata a Wellington Ball culture show described by reviewer Lyne Pringle as an inspiration show with distinct Māori and Pasifika movement merging hip hop, siva and 'supersonic swirling poi' as well as Ballroom moves such as dipping. Kōpū was also at the Hannah Playhouse, produced by Auckland theatre companies Te Rehia and Te Pou.

Kōpū takes the audience on a journey through life, snippets of core memories that are shared within Māori wāhine’s lives. (Mārie Jones 2023)
