= Maraea Rakuraku =

New Zealand poet and playwright

Maraea Rakuraku is a New Zealand playwright. Her play The Prospect won her New Playwright of the Year at the Chapman Tripp Theatre Awards in 2012. She won the Adam NZ Play Award in 2016 for Tan-Knee, which also won Best Play by a Māori Writer and Best Play by a Woman Writer.

She completed a doctorate at the International Institute of Modern Letters of Victoria University of Wellington in 2024, where she earned an MA in 2016.

Rakuraku works to provide space for those peoples who sit on the margins while exploring the continued impact of colonialism in 21st Century Aotearoa.

== Plays ==
Rakuraku's first full-length play The Prospect was awarded three Chapman Tripp Theatre Awards in 2012, including New Playwright of the Year. In 2012, Rakuraku also took home the annual Tau Mai e Kapiti Writer in Residence award. The play explores the trauma of colonization: “'How one culture assimilates another and the trail of destruction wrought as a result.' And there are moments that also echo the atrocities and justifications wrought by fundamentalism in every guise around the world and throughout history. In short, The Prospect proves how universal a culturally specific story can be. As for the prospects for our futures – that's up to us all, and seeing this play will contribute greatly to our collective understanding, as well as giving us a rich and insightful theatrical experience."

Rakuraku's second play, Tan-Knee, is the first of a planned trilogy, about a family of the Tūhoe iwi (tribe). After returning home from a successful boxing career, Tū is planning to re-open the Boxing Gym Muhammad's in his home town with his brother Pōtiki and their cousin Eunice. Twenty years have passed since Tū was last home and the town of Taneatua, known as Tan-Knee, is not as he remembers it. Rakuraku wrote the play in response to the 2007 raids of Te Urewera areas and lock downs by the state and the ongoing objectification of the Tūhoe iwi in the media. For this play she was awarded the Adam NZ Play Award in 2016. She also received awards for Best Play by a Māori Writer and Best Play by a Women Writer.

For her third play, Te Papakāinga, Rakuraku again won the Adam award for best playwright. The play (which also served as Rakuraku's master's thesis) concerns the effect of a child's death on a Māori village struggling with the effects of colonisation.

== Radio ==
Rakuraku's love for National Radio emerged in her youth as she grew up listening to children's programs every Sunday. In her time at Canterbury University she began broadcasting on the Māori students’ radio show. Several years and degrees later, while living in Auckland, Rakuraku completed two years as a volunteer for a talkback (Nga Mane Aute) at Radio Waatea. Later, she spent some time hosting a three-hour program on KFM Radio. In 2006, Maraea joined Radio New Zealand as co-producer and presenter of the Kaupapa Māori programme Te Ahi Kaa, sharing the role with Justine Murray.

== Poetry ==
Rakuraku is the co-editor of a book of Māori poetry in translation into English, Tātai Whetū: Seven Māori Women Poets in Translation, which also features some of her own poetry.

== Personal life ==
Rakuraku belongs to the Ngāi Tūhoe tribe (Ngāti Pāhauwera) on her father's side and Ngāti Kahungunu ki te Wairoa on her mother's side.
