= Dolina Wehipeihana =

New Zealand Māori dancer, theatre producer

Dolina Wehipeihana is a New Zealand Māori dancer, choreographer and theatre producer. She affiliates to Ngāti Raukawa and Ngati Tūkorehe iwi.

== Biography ==
Cambridge, New Zealand is Wehipeihana's home town where she grew up. She went to Sacred Heart College in Hamilton. Her first encounter with contemporary dance came from Dorothy Coe her PE (Physical Education) teacher. In Hamilton Wehipeihana performed at the opening of the Gallagher Performing Arts Centre at Waikato University in March 2001 alongside the late Hirini Melbourne.

Wehipeihana was a founding member of Atamira Dance Company and was creative producer for the company from 2002 to 2010 as well as performing in its productions. In 2012 she was head of programming for Auckland Arts Festival.

From 2016 to 2018 she was a member of the Performing Arts Network of New Zealand (PANNZ) executive committee. She was later appointed Kaiārahi Māori for the organisation. Wehipeihana is also the general manager of Kia Mau Festival. She is a member of the National Māori Theatre Steering Committee He Waka Ūrungi, and was on the steering committee of the National Māori Dance Summit.

Her choreographic work includes The Beautiful Ones written by Hone Kouka, and the Poi E Thriller-style dance in the 2010 film Boy.

Wehipeihana founded an independent production company, Betsy & Mana Productions, and through this company she produces theatre and dance. She has produced for White Face Crew and has also produced stage plays, including Flintlock Musket by Kirk Torrance and The Mooncake and the Kumara by Mei-Lin Te Puea Hansen.

== Personal life ==
In 2016 Wehipeihana married her partner of 14 years, actor Jarod Rawiri. She has a daughter from a previous relationship and Rawiri has three children from a previous relationship.
