= Nina Nawalowalo =

New Zealand theatre director

Nina Nawalowalo ONZM
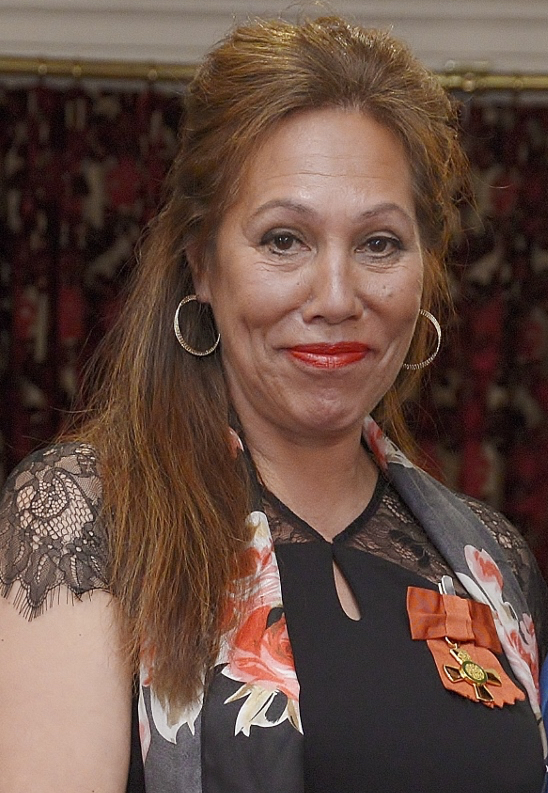
- Nawalowalo in 2018
- Occupation: Theatre director
- Writing career
- Notable awards: Senior Pacific Artist Award (2017); Contemporary Pacific Art Award (2007)

Nina Catharine Nawalowalo ONZM is a New Zealand theatre director and co-founder of the contemporary Pacific theatre company The Conch. She is known for directing the stage plays Vula and The White Guitar. The first film she directed A Boy Called Piano - The Story of Fa'amoana John Luafutu (2021) won 2022 Montreal Independent Film Festival Best Feature Documentary.

== Early life and education ==
Nina Catharine Nawalowalo was born in Paremata, Wellington, New Zealand, in 1963. Her mother was British and her father was Fijian, from the village of Tavuki, on Kadavu Island, and Nawalowalo spent two and a half years living in Fiji before returning to Wellington. She attended Wellington Teachers' College, and was the captain of the New Zealand under-20 basketball team.

Nawalowalo was teaching primary school upon graduating teachers' college, but left to join Robert Bennett's company Mime International and toured including to Moscow and Poland. This was the beginning of an education in performing arts. Notable teachers Nina studied under are: Antonia Fava, Philippe Gaulier and Pierre Byland.

== Career ==
Nawalowalo has worked as a theatre director since the 1980s. Creative partnerships were formed while she was living in London with magician Richard McDougall and illusion designer and magic consultant Paul Kieve. She has presented at over forty international festivals, including the London International Mime Festival, British Festival of Visual Theatre, and the Moscow Arts Festival.

In 2002 Nawalowalo co-founded the theatre company The Conch with Tom McCrory. Their productions focus on Pacific stories. The company is based in Wellington and had toured across New Zealand and internationally. In 2013 the pair established the Solomon Islands National Women's Theatre Company Stages of Change with a focus on addressing violence against women and girls. Nawalowalo's company provides and promotes access to the arts for Pacifika young people through Conchus Youth.

A long creative collaboration over eight years Nawalowalo has created with the Luafutu family two stage plays, a radio drama and in 2022 a film. The first play was The White Guitar presented in 2015, written by father Fa’amoana John Luafutu and sons Matthias Luafutu and Malo Luafutu aka Scribe and was autobiographical. It had sell-out seasons and an eight-city tour in 2015. A Boy Called Piano is a deeper look into Fa’amoana John Luafutu's childhood in state care and Nawalowalo has directed two stage productions, a radio play and a film based on this. The film was Nawalowalo's first as a director and is called A Boy Called Piano - The Story of Fa'amoana John Luafutu (2021), it won Best Feature Documentary in 2022 at the Montreal Independent Film Festival. Nawalowalo says of The Boy Called Piano, "Fa’amoana Luafutu is a courageous voice for the voiceless thousands of Māori and Pasifika children who suffered and continue to suffer in the system. This film is a testament to his and his family’s courage." A Pacific lens was used in the process to ensure there was trust between Luafutu and Nawalowalo.

=== Productions ===
- Vula (2002) premiered at BATS Theatre, also presented at the 9th Festival of Pacific Arts in Palau (2004), the Sydney Opera House (2006), the World Music Theatre Festival in the Netherlands (2008), the Barbican Theatre, London (2008)
- Masi (2012) premiered at Soundings Theatre, Te Papa Tongarewa, commissioned by the New Zealand International Arts Festival then toured Fiji and Sydney Festival
- The Prophet (2004), Downstage Theatre
- Duck Death and the Tulip (2014), Edinburgh Fringe Festival
- Stages of Change (2013-14), Solomon Islands
- The White Guitar (2015), co-directed with Jim Moriarty premiered at the Christchurch Arts Festival and in 2016 toured New Zealand
- Naked Samoans Do Magic (2018), commissioned by the Auckland Arts Festival
- A Boy Called Piano (2019), development season co-directed with Jim Moriarty
- A Boy Called Piano, radio play by Fa'amoana John Luafutu and Tom McCrory, produced by Radio New Zealand
- A Boy Called Piano - The Story of Fa'amoana John Luafutu (2021), film - directed by Nina Nawalowalo
- A Boy Called Piano (2022), national tour of Aotearoa

== Awards and honours ==
Nawalowalo received the Contemporary Pacific Art Award in 2007 and the Senior Pacific Artist Award in 2017 at the Arts Pasifika Awards.

In the 2018 Queen's Birthday Honours, she was appointed an Officer of the New Zealand Order of Merit, for services to theatre and Pacific culture.
