= Nancy Brunning =

New Zealand actress, director, and writer (1971–2019)

- Born: 1971; Taupō, New Zealand
- Died: 16 November 2019 (aged 48); Wellington, New Zealand
- Education: Toi Whakaari
- Occupations: Actor, director, writer
- Years active: 1992–2019

Nancy Brunning (1971 – 16 November 2019) was a New Zealand actress, director, and writer who won awards in film and television and made a major contribution to the growth of Māori in the arts. She won the best actress award at the New Zealand Film Awards for her lead role in the film What Becomes of the Broken Hearted? (1999). In 2000, she won the Best Actress in Drama award at the New Zealand Television Awards for her lead role in the television series Ngā Tohu.

She was the acting coach for the Oscar-nominated short film Two Cars, One Night directed by Taika Waititi. According to friend and frequent collaborator Temuera Morrison, she "paved the way" for Māori actors in New Zealand.

== Biography ==
Brunning grew up in Taupō, and was of Māori descent, from the tribes of Ngāti Raukawa and Ngāi Tūhoe.

Brunning attended Toi Whakaari New Zealand Drama School from 1990, graduating in 1991 with a Diploma in Acting. She lived in Wellington for most of her life.

After graduating, she played many leading roles in theatre, film and television. In 1992, she won the award for Most Promising Female Actor at the Chapman Tripp Theatre Awards for the all Māori women production Nga Wahine. She also became one of the most well known faces on New Zealand television in the role of Jaki Manu in the soap Shortland Street and other programmes. In 1994, she appeared in the classic Nga Tangata Toa play written by Hone Kouka and directed by Colin McColl. Brunning also appeared on stage in major productions for the New Zealand International Festival of the Arts, the biggest arts event in the country, in productions such as Hide ‘n’ Seek (1992) (NZ and Australian tour) and Waiora (1996) (NZ, Brighton Festival and Hawai'i tours) and Blue Smoke. She played the role of Belle in the UK-NZ co-production of Beauty and the Beast (1998).

A speaker of the indigenous Māori language, Brunning also worked as a theatre director, cultural advisor and script consultant. She received a best actress nomination at the 2009 Qantas Film & TV Awards for her role in the movie Strength of Water.

Brunning directed theatre and stage dramas from 1995. Her first production was Briar Grace-Smith's first full-length one woman show called Nga Pou Wahine. She also collaborated with Grace-Smith on a Taki Rua Theatre production in 1996 called Flat out Brown; directed Māori language play Te Ohaki a Nihe written by Selwyn Muru and devised and directed with Grace-Smith again on a touring show called Waitapu, also in 1996. She directed Women Far Walking written by Māori writer Witi Ihimaera. The play toured nationally and internationally to the UK. She was also assistant director with Nathaniel Lees on Awhi Tapu by Albert Belz for the Auckland Festival. She was assistant director for the play The Songmaker's Chair written by Albert Wendt and directed by Nathaniel Lees.

Brunning directed the short film Journey to Ihipa (2008) which screened at the New Zealand International Film Festivals and internationally, including the Vladivostok Film Festival (2009) and in New York. The film starred veteran New Zealand actress Elizabeth McRae and Nathaniel Lees, and was shot in the Ngai Tuhoe Māori community of Ruatahuna in the central North Island of New Zealand.

Brunning and theatre maker and educator Tanea Heke formed a production company Hāpai Productions in 2013 with a vision to "produce mana enhancing Māori Theatre productions whilst upholding Māori Values."

Brunning's last creative work Witi's Wāhine premiered at the Te Tairāwhiti Arts Festival in Gisborne in 2019. She wrote and directed this play as a tribute to the women characters in the novels of Witi Ihimaera. It has since been performed in Auckland and in the Kia Mau Festival in Wellington in 2021. Emma Hislop, in her review of the 2023 staging at the ASB Waterfront Theatre, said that the play is an "incredible gift" from Brunning: "The 18 scenes in Witi's Wāhine weave an intricate pattern through Ihimaera’s works, and the result is astonishing".

== Personal life and death ==
Brunning's partner was fellow playwright Hone Kouka. They had one daughter together, the singer-songwriter Mā.

Brunning died on 16 November 2019 at age 48, nine years after being diagnosed with cancer. She posthumously won the Bruce Mason Playwriting Award the following day. Friend and frequent collaborator Temuera Morrison paid tribute to her. In a post on Facebook, New Zealand television and radio host Stacey Morrison wrote that Brunning was "Our māmā, our sister, our aunty, our friend, she has followed the call of her tīpuna. Nancy's passion was to bring unheard stories to the light. To remind our people that our voices are a powerful tool and aroha is the most important thing of all. And while she was loved by the world, she was loved even more by us. She was the person that bound our whānau together." Following her death, there were calls for Pharmac, the national drug funding agency, to be reformed.

== Filmography ==
Film and television
Year	Title	Role	Notes
1992–1994	Shortland Street	Jaki Manu	Regular role
1997	Nga Wahine	Daina	
1998	When Love Comes Along	Fig	
1999	What Becomes of the Broken Hearted?	Tania Rogers	
2000	Ngā Tohu: Signatures	Keri/Hinewai	
2001	Crooked Earth	Marama	
2002	Turangawaewae	Rose	Short
2002	Der Liebe entgegen	Meri Nahu	TV film
2004	Fracture	Doctor	
2004	Kerosene Creek	Mu and Sonny Boy's Mother	Short
2009	The Strength of Water	Joy	
2009	The Cult	Mrs. Thomas	Episode: "The Calling"
2012	Korero Mai	Rita	Episodes: "9.16", "9.18"
2013	White Lies	Horiana	
2014	The Pa Boys	Puti's Mum	
2016	Mahana	Ramona Mahana	
2018	In Dark Places	Auntie Terry	TV film
2018	The Brokenwood Mysteries	Magdalena	Episode: "Scared to Death"
2019	Daffodils	ICU Doctor	
2019	Daniel	Sister	Short
2020	Reunion	Kathy	Post-production (Posthumous release)
