= New Zealand Festival of the Arts =

Biennial arts festival in Wellington, New Zealand since 1986

- Genre: Arts festival
- Frequency: Biennially
- Location: Wellington
- Country: New Zealand
- Major events: Music, theatre, dance, literature
- Patrons: The Governor-General, Her Excellency The Right Honourable Dame Cindy Kiro, GNZM, QSO, DStJ

Aotearoa New Zealand Festival of the Arts is a multi-arts biennial festival based in Wellington New Zealand that started in 1986. Previous names are the New Zealand International Festival of the Arts, New Zealand International Arts Festival, New Zealand Arts Festival and New Zealand Festival of the Arts. The festival is produced every two years and runs across three weeks in venues in Wellington City and wider region. The festival features both international and national acts from performing arts and music with a literary programme also.

== History ==
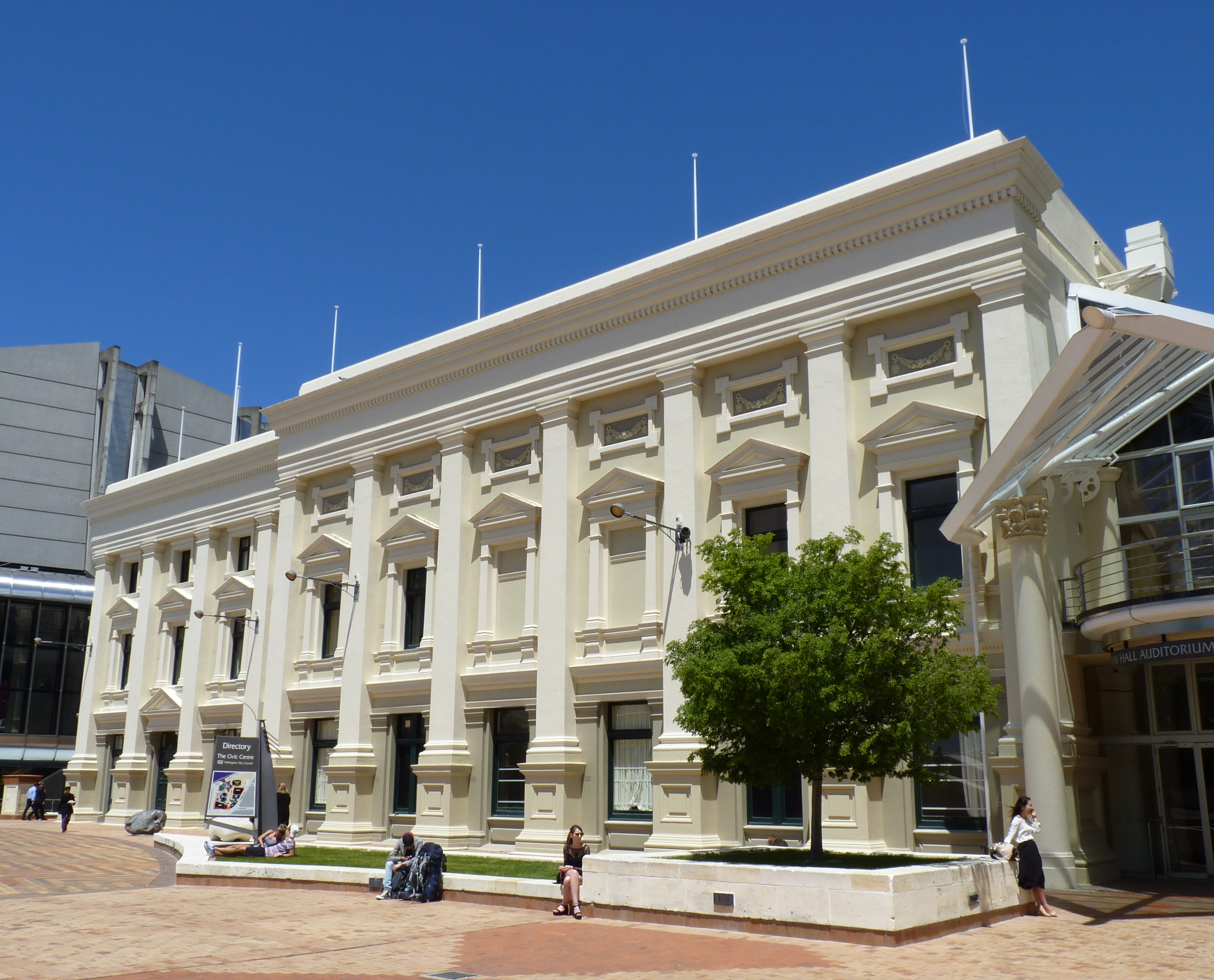
Wellington Town Hall a commonly used venue in the New Zealand Arts Festival. Was unavailable in 2020 due to required earthquake strengthening.

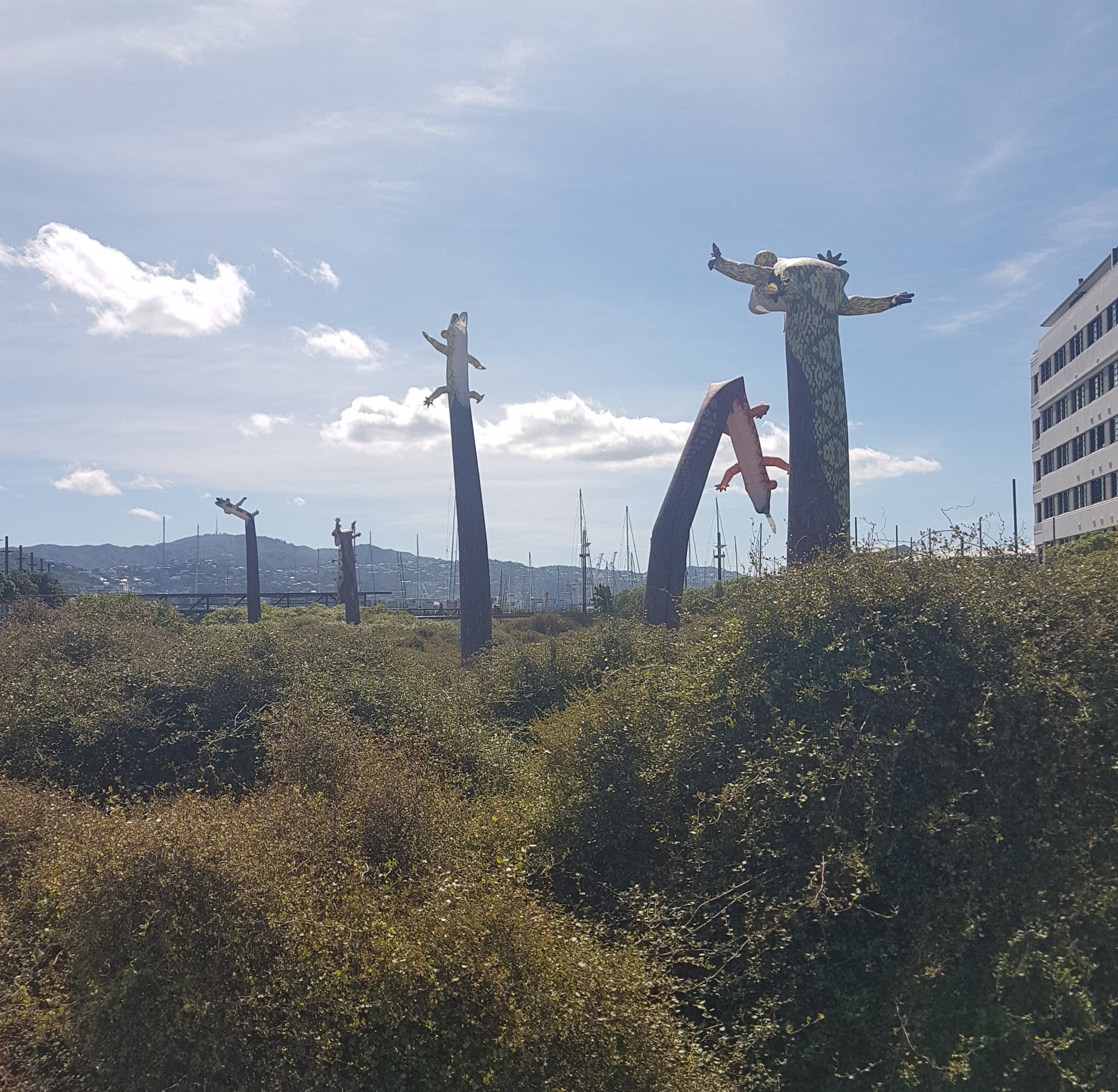
Ngā Kaikanikani ō te Rangi - The Sky Dancers - Waitangi Park by Lisa Reihana, Aotearoa New Zealand Festival 2022

The festival started in 1986 in Wellington as the New Zealand International Festival of the Arts. The festival was modelled on the Adelaide Festival in Australia. Amongst the people creating this first festival were arts patrons headed by former Prime Minister Jack Marshall. The Wellington City Council and mayor Ian Lawrence supported the festival and the council has continued to support the festival. The festival made a loss for the first four festivals until in 1994 it turned a profit.

Criticism of the council funding international acts in the first festival spawned an alternative event called Flying Kiwi focusing on local artists which was the genesis of the long running New Zealand Fringe Festival.

In 2012 looking back at the legacy of the festival, classical music critic John Button stated the festival placed Wellington as the cultural capital of New Zealand.

Wellington also had the Wellington Festival that was held every three years starting in 1959. The Wellington Festival Trust became the New Zealand International Festival of the Arts Trust.

Another National Arts Festival was run by the NZ Student's arts council in 1977 involving, film, publications, happenings, music, dance, theatre, puppetry.

== Programme ==
A range of dance, theatre, music and outdoor events have been programmed over the years. This is across classical and contemporary includes some free events. The festival includes a literary Writers and Readers festival with Janet Frame one of the participants in 1986.

The programme includes international acts, many not seen before in New Zealand. A small selection is named here to give an indication. The Staatskapelle Berlin State Orchestra played at the first festival in 1986 and was the first overseas orchestra to play in New Zealand in twelve years. Sacred Monsters with dancers Sylvie Guillem and Akram Khan was a hit. The Dragons' Trilogy by Ex Machina (dir. Robert Lepage) in 2008 was notable for the positive reviews and for the five and a half hours length.

The New Zealand Festival of the Arts also has a commissioning and partnership programme for New Zealand work and has premiered many productions. The playwright Hone Kouka has had four productions premiered at the festival, Waiora (1996), Home Fires (1998), The Prophet (2004). and Bless The Child (2018).

There is a literary programme as part of the festival. The 2022 literary programme was created by Claire Mabey, the director of Verb Festival and LitCrawl Wellington and was online. The programme included talks with Mariana Mazzucato, N K Jemisin, Clementine Ford, Emily Writes and a celebration of 30 years of HUIA publishing with co-founder Robyn Rangihuia Bargh and current directors Brian Morris and Eboni Waitere.

Other parts of the 2022 festival programme were cancelled or scaled down due to COVID-19 public health measures.

== Organisation ==
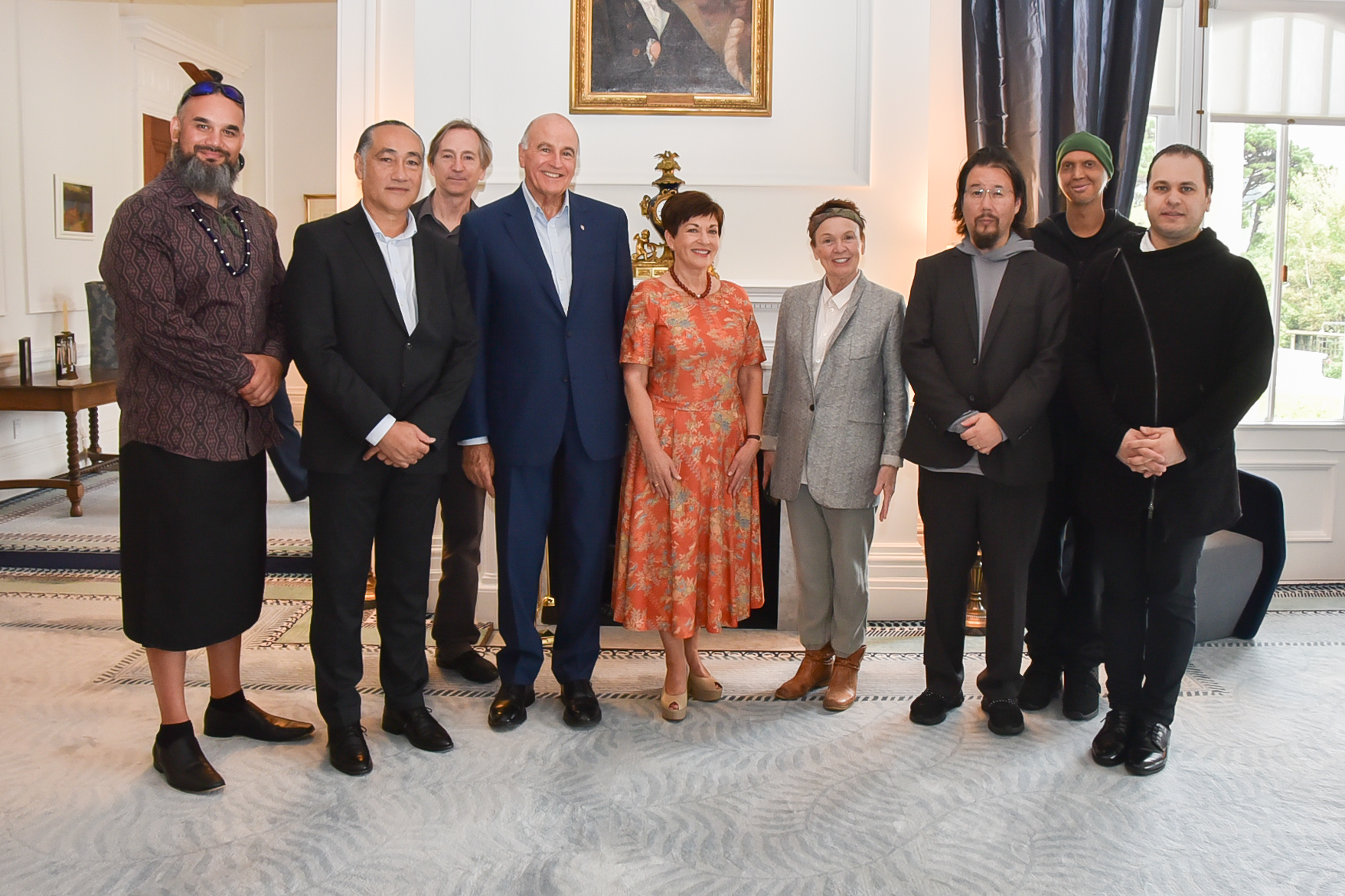
Guests at a lunch for key people involved in the 2020 New Zealand Festival of the Arts. (Government House, Wellington, 2 March 2020). Left to right: Horomona Horo, Lemi Ponifasio, Greg Cohen, Sir David Gascoigne, Dame Patsy Reddy, Laurie Anderson, Eyvind Kang, Shahzad Ismaily and Reubin Kodheli.

The New Zealand Festival is a charitable trust with a board of trustees and is funded by a number of public and private organisations. These include Creative New Zealand and the Wellington City Council. There are a core staff on a salary and numbers increase in preparation for their events.

=== Tāwhiri ===
In 2018 there was a re-organisation and re-branding of the organisation to Tāwhiri: Festivals and Experiences. Tāwhiri core staff organise and programme the Aotearoa New Zealand Festival of Arts, and also the Wellington Jazz Festival, Kiri Te Kanawa Song Quest (formerly the Mobil Song Quest and Lexus Song Quest). The organisation also produces other events from time to time including Second Unit. and, in partnership with Wellington City Council, Te Hui Ahurei Reo Māori, a Māori language festival in 2022 as part of the commemorations of the 50th anniversary of the presentation of the Māori language petition to Parliament.

In 2020 Tāwhiri invited three artists to curate the programme. These Guest Curators were Lemi Ponifasio, Laurie Anderson and Bret McKenzie.

Mere Boynton was appointed as Director Ngā Toi Māori in 2019, joining Creative Director Marnie Karmelita. Between them they programmed the 2022 and 2024 Aotearoa New Zealand Festival of the Arts and Wellington Jazz Festival.

Current Festival Co-Directors Tama Waipara MNZM and Dolina Wehipeihana were appointed in 2024, curating the 2026 Aotearoa New Zealand Festival of the Arts, the Festival's 40th year, along with the Wellington Jazz Festival.

In 2026, Tāwhiri opened a flexible mid-sized theatre venue, the Tāwhiri Warehouse, in Newtown.

=== Festival Directors ===
| Festival Year | Leadership team |
|---|---|
| 1986 & 1988 | Michael Maxwell (artistic director) |
| 1990 & 1992 | Christopher Doig (artistic director) |
| 1994 | Rob Brookman (artistic director) |
| 1996 | Joseph Seelig (artistic director), Carla Van Zon (executive director) |
| 1996, 1998 & 2000 | Joseph Seelig (artistic director) |
| 2002, 2004 & 2006 | Carla Van Zon (artistic director), David Inns (executive director) |
| 2008 | Lissa Twomey (artistic director), David Inns (executive director) |
| 2010 & 2012 | Lissa Twomey (artistic director), Sue Paterson ONZM (executive director) |
| 2014, 2016 | Shelagh Magadza (artistic director) |
| 2018 | Shelagh Magadza (artistic director), Meg Williams (executive director) |
| 2020 | Marnie Karmelita (artistic director), Meg Williams (executive director) |
| 2022 | Marnie Karmelita (artistic director), Mere Boynton (Director Ngā Toi Māori), Meg Williams (executive director) |
| 2024 | Marnie Karmelita (artistic director), Mere Boynton (Director Ngā Toi Māori), Angela Green (executive director) |
| 2026 | Dolina Wehipeihana and Tama Waipara (festival co-directors), Angela Green (executive director) |
