= Hone Kouka =

New Zealand playwright, theatre director and producer

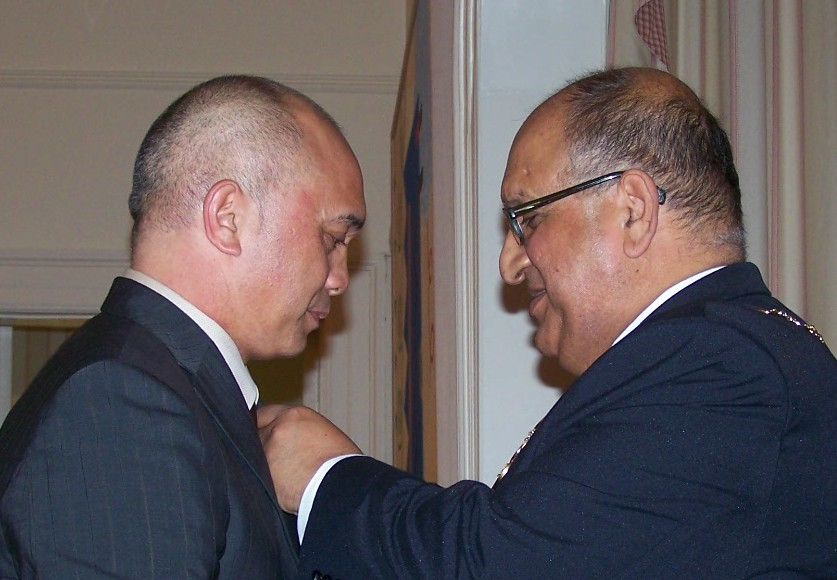
Kouka (left) receives the insignia of Member of the New Zealand Order of Merit from governor-general Sir Anand Satyanand in 2009

Hone Vivian Kouka MNZM (born 1968) is a New Zealand playwright. He has written 13 plays, which have been staged in New Zealand and worldwide including Canada, South Africa, New Caledonia and Britain. Kouka's plays have won multiple awards at the Chapman Tripp Theatre Awards. Kouka has also worked as a theatre director and producer. In 2009, Kouka was appointed a Member of the New Zealand Order of Merit, for services to contemporary Māori theatre.

== Background ==
Born in Balclutha in 1968, Kouka was educated at King's High School, Dunedin, and graduated with a Bachelor of Arts degree in English from the University of Otago in 1988. Later, he graduated from Toi Whakaari: NZ Drama School in 1990, with a Diploma in Acting.

Kouka has ancestral ties to the Māori tribes of Ngāti Porou, Ngāti Kahungunu and Ngāti Raukawa. He was the partner of fellow playwright and actress, director and writer Nancy Brunning (1971–2019), with whom he had a daughter, the singer-songwriter Mā.

== Plays ==
Kouka's 1994 play Nga Tangata Toa (The Warrior People) is heralded as a masterpiece in New Zealand theatre. Directed by veteran theatre director Colin McColl, Nga Tangata Toa was first staged at Taki Rua Theatre in Wellington during the 1990s and won numerous awards at the prestigious Chapman Tripp Theatre Awards. The lead role, Rongomai, was played by award-winning actress Nancy Brunning. Nga Tangata Toa was inspired by Henrik Ibsen's play The Vikings of Helgeland. Nga Tangata Toa was later re-staged at Downstage Theatre in 2006 under the direction of James Beaumont.

In 1996, Kouka was commissioned by the New Zealand International Arts Festival to write Waiora, which later toured nationally and internationally in 1997. Waiora became the first play in a trilogy that includes Home Fires (1998) and The Prophet. Waiora shows the effects on Māori of urban migration, with the whānau having left Waiora for work. In Homefires, Kouka writes about the people who stay behind and 'keep the home fires burning' and the stories remembered. The Prophet shows the return 'home' of teenage cousins who have visited but never lived in Waiora.

Other plays include Hide 'n' Seek, co-written with Hori Ahipene, and Five Angels.

In 2015, Kouka's play Bless the Child won the Adam NZ Play Award before it had even been performed. The play's theme is violence against children in contemporary New Zealand.

== Other work ==
Kouka established the Kia Mau Festival (initially called the Ahi Kaa Festival) in the Wellington area. The festival showcases Māori, Pasifika and indigenous performing arts and runs biennially in June. In 2001, Kouka co-founded Tawata Productions with Miria George. Tawata Productions stages new New Zealand plays nationally and internationally. Kouka and George are co-directors of Tawata Productions.

== Published ==
- Hone Kouka (1994). Nga Tangata Toa: The Warrior People. Wellington: Te Herenga Waka University Press. ISBN 0-86473-278-3. OL 1235357M. Wikidata Q106815726.
- Hone Kouka (1992). Mauri Tu. Aoraki Press Theatre Series. Wellington. ISBN 0-908925-01-8. Wikidata Q106835583.
- Hone Kouka (2006). The Prophet. Wellington: Huia Publishers. ISBN 1-86969-241-1. OL 8649434M. Wikidata Q106819253.
- Hone Kouka (2019). Waiora: Te Ūkaipō - the Homeland. Playmarket. ISBN 978-0-908607-67-9. Wikidata Q106819352.

== Honours and awards ==
In 1992, Kouka received the Bruce Mason Playwriting Award, and in 2015 he won the Adam Play Award for Bless the Child.

In the 2009 Queen's Birthday Honours, Kouka was appointed a Member of the New Zealand Order of Merit, for services to contemporary Māori theatre.
