= Young and Hungry Arts Trust =

New Zealand youth theatre organisation

- Nickname: Young and Hungry Festival
- Formation: 1994
- Dissolved: 2022
- Purpose: Performing arts skills building for young people between 16 - 24 years
- Headquarters: Wellington
- Location: New Zealand

Young and Hungry Arts Trust (1994 - 2022) was a New Zealand based youth theatre initiative. They have held festivals of plays, commissioned playwrights, toured New Zealand and helped along the careers of many New Zealand actors, writers, designers and directors. The first event was a festival held in 1994 at BATS Theatre.

== Background ==
In 1994 Conrad Newport produced the first The Young and Hungry Festival of New Theatre at BATS Theatre. It was one-act plays with a cast and crew of young people ranging from 16 – 25 years old with a professional environment led by processional directors. It continued to be an annual festival at BATS with three commissioned plays by emerging playwrights until it expanded to Auckland at the Basement Theatre with three shows a year from 2012 and 2015. An Ambassadors programme with Auckland Theatre Company was added to support engagement with youth for longer than the rehearsal period and season. The focus has always been to support learning about theatre for young people through application.

Playmarket published a volume in 2010, Three Plays - Young & Hungry with plays: queen b, by Pip Hall; Exchange by Lauren Jackson; and Urban Hymns by Mīria George.

It closed in October 2022 with the board stating "difficulties of seeking funding project-to-project, the limited ability to provide long-term assured employment, and as a result, a limited capacity to invest in long-term planning."

== Productions ==
Some notable productions presented at the annual festivals include in RPM (2008), written by Dave Armstrong, directed by Leo Gene Peters, in 2009 three plays, Oyster by Vivienne Plumb, directed by Rachel More, Sit On It, by Georgina Titheridge, directed by Lyndee-Jane Rutherford and Urban Hymns by Mīria George, directed by Fiona Truelove and The 21st Narcissus (2015) by Sam Brooks.

In 2011 the Auckland Theatre Company Young and Hungry Festival of New Theatre at the Basement Theatre featured a play by Jo Randerson, Gary Henderson and Tom Sainsbury, and young people learned about design and production mentored by Elizabeth Whiting (costume), Simon Coleman (set), Brad Gledhill (lighting) and Fern Christie (stage management).

Past playwrights commissioned include Jackie Van Beek, Victor Rodger, Jean Betts, Danny Mulheron, Arthur Meek, Hone Kouka, Helen Varley Jamieson, Pip Hall and Briar Grace-Smith.

In 2015 Young and Hungry started touring to secondary schools with a play made from extracts of New Zealand plays. The 2021 tour was called Whaddarya? and includes parts of plays by Stephen Sinclair, Hone Kouka, Renée, Craig Thane, Greg McGee, Sam Brooks, and Albert Belz. This concept was previously produced by EnsembleImpact who partnered with Young and Hungry.
