= Martyn Roberts =

New Zealand theatre designer and photographer

- Born: 1965 or 1966 (age 59–60)
- Education: University of Otago (MFA, 2014)
- Occupations: Lighting and set designer; photographer
- Known for: afterburner (arts collective)

Martyn Roberts (born 1965 or 1966) is a New Zealand lighting and set designer and photographer, and founder of the arts collective afterburner theatre productions. Roberts has won 14 theatre awards. The afterburner production Dark Matter, conceived and created by Roberts won Best of Fringe at the 2017 NZ Fringe Festival Awards.

== Background ==
Roberts grew up in Wellington. He went on a PEP Scheme (Project Employment Programme) after school and worked with a theatre troupe in Northland. He then enrolled in a master's degree in theatre at Victoria University of Wellington and began working in lighting design in the mid-1990s. In the 1990s over four years or so he worked with writer Jo Randerson, director and designer Andrew Foster, and actors Jo Smith and Jason White in the theatre company Trouble producing six shows. He won his first lighting design award in 1996 for the play Black Monk by Trouble and his second for their play The Lead Wait.

He founded the arts collective afterburner in 2001. A lighting and set designer who has worked throughout New Zealand, and internationally in Sydney, Brisbane, Edinburgh, and Glasgow, Roberts teaches theatre technology and design in the Theatre Studies programme at the University of Otago. According to Roberts, being deaf has made him "very visually aware" and "has been a continual source of inspiration" for how he sees and relates to the world. In 2014 he graduated with a masters of fine arts degree in theatre studies from the University of Otago.

Past collaborations have included Airport Conversations, which afterburner developed together with The Company of Pleasure based in Melbourne, Australia, with funding from Creative New Zealand. The work is based on the tragic 1993 fire at the Kader Toy Factory in Bangkok, Thailand. In 2014 Roberts received a service honour medal from the Dunedin Theatre Awards in recognition of completing 'more than 50 professional shows'.

Roberts has won the Lighting Design award at the Chapman Trip Theatre Awards five times, been awarded five times at the NZ Fringe Festival Awards and four awards at the Dunedin Theatre Awards.

== afterburner major productions and critical reception ==
Afterburner specialises in productions hybridising installation and live performance. Other major productions have included Fission, Nag, and The Cell Trilogy, which included The Singularity and The Telescope.

=== The Cell Trilogy ===
Between 2001 and 2008, afterburner created and presented a trilogy of work about astrophysics and human nature. The Cell Trilogy included Man on the Moon (2001), The Telescope (2002) and The Singularity (2008).

The Telescope involved composers Sebastian Morgan Lynch and Steve Gallagher present on stage while their music interacted with light and the performers' actions. When presented at the FUEL Festival, reviewer William Peterson described it as fitting in with the New Zealand tradition of theatre practice of "a willingness to cross interdisciplinary boundaries".

The Singularity received mixed reviews; the design rated highly with the set and light "telling a story of its own" and the soundscape by Matthew Hutton adding value, but the script was described as "too cryptic". The Singularity was written and directed by Miranda Manasiadis, from an original story by Miranda Manasiadis, Roberts and Jason Whyte. The actors were Danny Mulheron, Jessica Robinson, Rose Beauchamp and Jason Whyte. Set design was by Roberts, lighting design by Roberts and Rob Larson.

=== Dark Matter ===
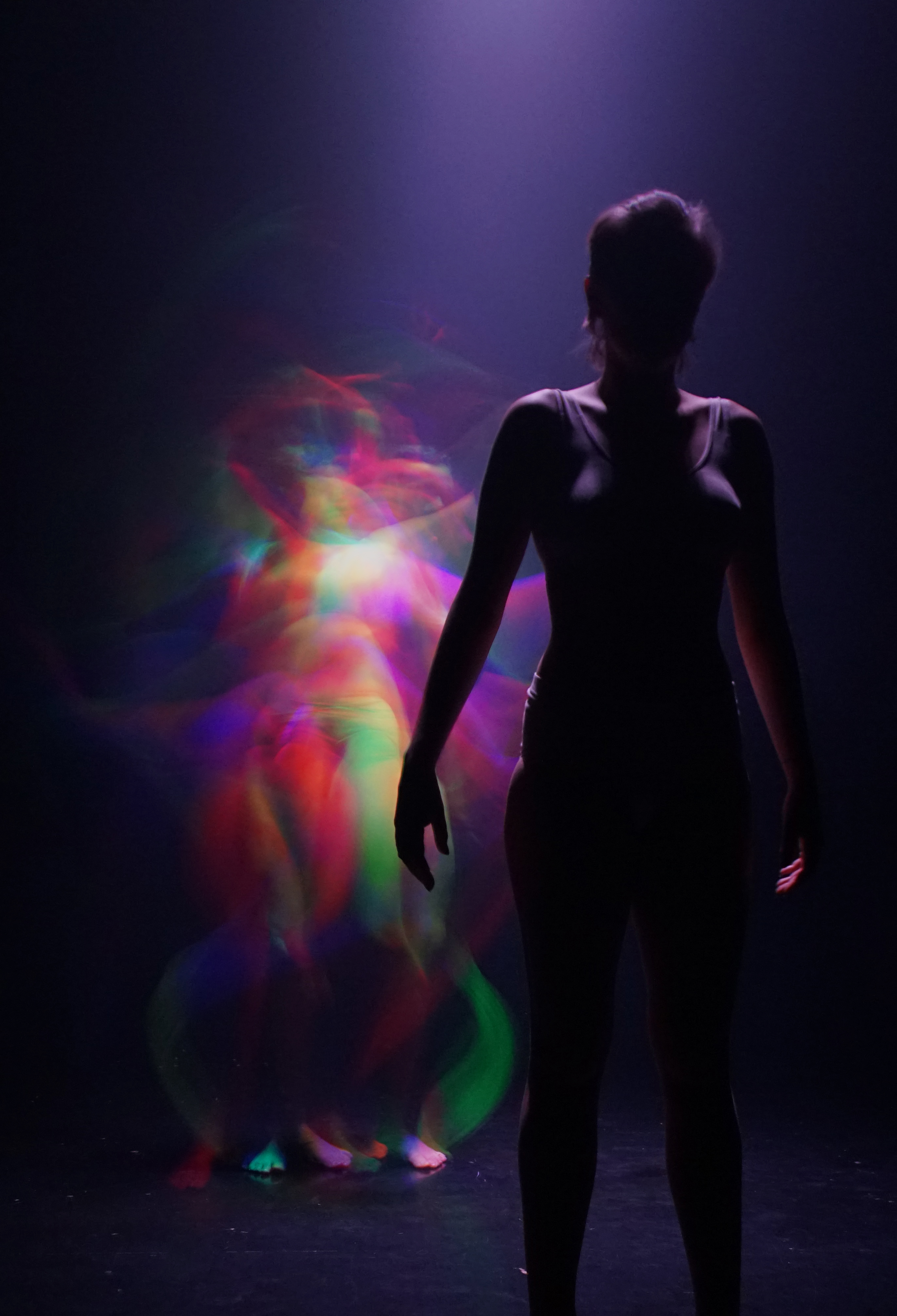
Dark Matter (2018)

Afterburner's 2016 production Dark Matter contributes to a small number of performing arts work in New Zealand that centre creative work by lighting designers "as a work about light". A review in Theatreview compared Dark Matter to works by David Lynch, in part because "the tension...never lets up for the full 45 minute performance" due to the darkness and the sound which "menaces and rumbles"; in other words, the tension makes the audience part of the piece.

The production Dark Matter won two Dunedin Fringe Festival awards in 2016, and Best of Fringe 2017 in the New Zealand Fringe Festival in Wellington. Dark Matter was also featured in the 2018 Dunedin Arts Festival and at the 2019 Prague Quadrennial as a virtual reality exhibit. Dark Matter came from Roberts' master of fine arts thesis. Designer and critique Sam Trubridge places Dark Matter amongst the work of other lighting designers in New Zealand such as Tony Rabbit, Marcus McShane and Helen Todd (and her work with Lemi Ponifasio), who treat light as "an art form that is expressive in its own right". In Dark Matter the audience starts in complete darkness "unable to even see their hands in front of them" and so visually impaired it creates a "heightened sensory experience". The sound was created by Dr Jeremy Mayall.

=== Fission ===
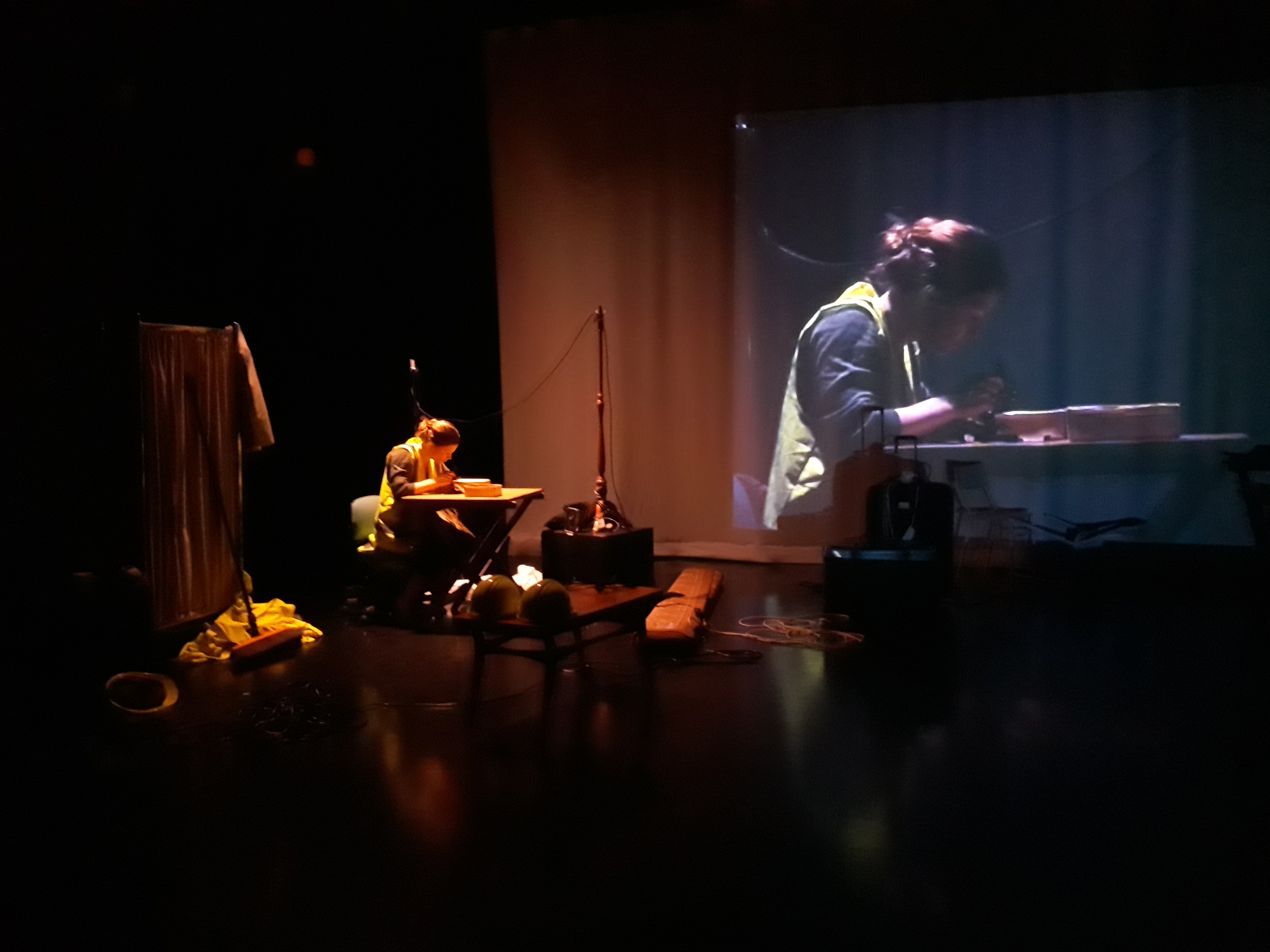
Fission

Fission, produced by afterburner, was performed over five nights in March 2019 at the Allen Hall Theatre, telling the story of Lise Meitner, who discovered nuclear fission but was overlooked for a Nobel Prize despite being nominated 48 times. It was an arts and science collaboration by theatre-makers and scientists that had a focus on process and learning. One of the frameworks of the project was a "bicultural performance process", and the project investigated connections between science and mātauranga Māori.

There were a number of workshops with reflection, research and meetings in between. The first workshop was in December 2016 with Rua McCallum (theatre-maker and Māori researcher), Megan Wilson (dancer), Roberts, Anna van den Bosch (technician), Hilary Halba and David O’Donnell (theatre directors) and scientists David Hutchinson and Dr Ian Griffin. Other collaborators were added to subsequent workshops.

At the time of the 2019 production Fission the team of 19 theatre professionals held 19 awards between them. A summary of the research in the creation of Fission is stated in a paper published in The Theatre Times:

In this work, a scientific theory such as quantum entanglement can also become a dramaturgical and aesthetic principle. Fission also demonstrates the considerable potential of collaborative devised theatre in opening up connections between Indigenous knowledge and scientific theories. (2020 – Hilary Halba and David O’Donnell with David Hutchinson, Rua McCallum and Martyn Roberts)

== List of past productions ==
Selected list of productions worked on or produced by Roberts:

- Man on the Moon (2001), afterburner
- line:near (2001), afterburner
- The Telescope (2002), afterburner
- crossing the concourse (2004), afterburner
- Fog and Mirrors (2005), afterburner
- Radiolight (2005), afterburner
- Pathlight (2006), afterburner
- The Singularity (2008), afterburner, BATS Theatre. Written and directed by Miranda Manasiadis. Co-designed by Martyn Roberts and Rob Larsen
- Nag (2010), afterburner, Toi Pōneke, 61 Abel Smith Street, Wellington. By Marcus McShane with Peter Stenhouse, Andrew Shaw, Erin Banks, Thomas Press, Joseph Nicholls and Adri Lamprect
- This Other Eden (2014), Opera Otago
- Dark Matter (2016), afterburner, Dunedin Fringe Festival
- Dark Matter (2017), afterburner, New Zealand Fringe Festival in Wellington.
- Dark Matter (2018), afterburner, Dunedin Arts Festival
- Dark Matter (2019), afterburner, Prague Quadrennial (virtual reality exhibit)
- Fission (2019), afterburner, Allen Hall Theatre, University of Otago, Dunedin
- Dr Bullers Birds (2006), New Zealand Festival of the Arts
- Last Resort Cafe, afterburner, at the Allen Hall Theatre
- Punk Rock, Fortune Theatre
- Yours Truly, by Albert Belz, BATS Theatre
