= Adam NZ Play Award =

Annual award for new plays in New Zealand

- Genre: Literary awards
- Begins: 2008
- Frequency: Annual
- Country: New Zealand
- Inaugurated: 2008

The Adam NZ Play Award is an annual award in New Zealand given to new plays. There are a range of categories and submitted plays are read blind by a panel of industry professionals.

== History ==
The award started in 2008 and was initially called the Playmarket New New Zealand Play Award. The Adam Foundation support the awards with a total of $8,000 in prizes. The Adam Foundation was established by Denis and Verna Adam in 1976 initially for art and then for other creative endeavours. Denis Adam died in October 2018. There is also an Adam Foundation Prize in Creative Writing.

In 2019, Mitch Tawhi Thomas became the first playwright to win an Adam NZ Play award twice, the first for Hui in 2012 and then for Pakaru (in 2019).

The winners are announced at a ceremony each year.

== Eligibility and conditions ==
The panel accepts up to three new plays but only be submitted to the competition once. There are no style or length limits. The plays must not have had a professional production (upcoming productions, readings, workshops or community productions are acceptable). The cut off is the 1 December each year.

Categories include:

- Best Play
- Best Play by a Māori Playwright
- Best Play by a Pasifika Playwright
- Best Play by a Woman Playwright

Plays can win more than one category.

== Adam NZ Play Award recipients and runners ups ==
2008: Ninna Tersman for Fucking Parasites. This was work-shopped in London, directed by Lorae Parry with script advisor Tanika Gupta.

2009: Pip Hall for The 53rd Victim won the New Play Award. The 53rd Victim, and Sketch by Kate Morris were also selected for rehearsed public readings as part of the Aotearoa Playwrights Conference New Writing / New Producing Forum at the Auckland Festival.

2010: Stuart Hoar for Pasefika. The Best Play by a Māori Playwright: Whiti Hereaka for Te Kaupoi. Special Prize for a Woman Playwright: Fiona Samuel for The Liar's Bible. Special Prize for an Auckland Playwright: Tom Sainsbury for The Canary.

2011: Arun Subramaniam for Hero. Runners-up: Courtney Meredith for Rushing Dolls and Georgina Titheridge for Sliderhands. Best Play by a Pasifika Playwright: Maureen Fepulea'i for e ono tama'i pato. Best Play by a Māori Playwright: Whiti Hereaka for Rona and Rabbit on the Moon. Best Play by a Woman Playwright: Georgina Titheridge for Sliderhands and Courtney Meredith for Rushing Dolls. The Play Press submission to Susan Smith Blackburn Prize: Georgina Titheridge for Sliderhands. Special Mention (Playmarket & Circa sponsored reading): Joe Musaphia for Problems. PumpHouse Theatre Prize for an Auckland Playwright: Margot McRae for Fools' Paradise.

2012: Mitch Tawhi Thomas for his play Hui, which also won Best Play by a Māori Playwright. Runners-up: Dawn Cheong for Remnants of the Silk Maker's Ghost and Philip Braithwaite for White City. Best Play by a Woman playwright and The Play Press choice for the Susan Smith Blackburn prize: Dawn Cheong for Remnants of the Silk Maker's Ghost. Best play by a Pasifika playwright: Jonathan Riley for Makigi. PumpHouse choice for their 2 week development season: Pip Hall for Ache.

2013: Phillip Braithwaite for The Mercy Clause. Runner-up: Paul Baker for The Night Visitors. Best Play by a Pasifika Playwright: David Mamea for Goodbye My Feleni. Best Play by a Māori Playwright: Renae Maihi for Patua. Best Play by a Woman Playwright and The Play Press choice for submission to the Susan Smith Blackburn Prize: Hannah McKie for Mary Scott: Queen of the Backblocks.

2014: Elisabeth Easther for Seed. Runner up: Pip Hall for Mule and Nancy Brunning for Hikoi. Best Play by a Māori Playwright: Nancy Brunning for Hikoi. Best Play by a Woman Writer: Elisabeth Easther for Seed. Highly Commended: Mei-Lin Te Puea Hansen for The Mooncake and the Kumara and Sam Brooks for Riding in Cars with (Mostly Straight) Boys.

2015: Anders Falstie-Jensen for Centrepoint and Hone Kouka for Bless the Child. Runner up: Dean Parker for Polo. Best Play by a Māori Playwright: Hone Kouka for Bless the Child. Best Play by a Woman Playwright: Michelanne Forster for The Gift of Tongues. Best Play by a Pasifika Playwright: David Mamea for Kingswood. Highly Commended: Tom McCrory for Significance.

2016: Maraea Rakuraku for Tan-knee. Runner up: Josephine Stewart-Tewhiu for Sean Penn is in His Boat. Best Play by a Māori Playwright: Maraea Rakuraku for Tan-knee. Best Play by a Woman Playwright: Maraea Rakuraku for Tan-knee. Best Play by a Pasifika Playwright: Suli Moa for 12th Round. Highly Commended: Steven Page for Fool to Cry and Finnius Teppett for My Dad's Boy.

2017: D.F. Mamea for Still Life with Chickens. Runner up: Lori Leigh for Uneasy Dreams and Other Things. Best Play by a Māori Playwright: Maraea Rakuraku for Te Papakāinga. Best Play by a Pasifika Playwright: D.F. Mamea for Still Life with Chickens. Highly Commended: Sam Brooks for Burn Her.

2018: Shane Bosher for Everything After. Best Play by a Māori Playwright: Albert Belz for Cradle Song and Jason Te Mete for Little Black Bitch. Best Play by a Pasifika Playwright: Suli Moa for Tales of A Princess. Best Play by a Woman Playwright: Angie Farrow for Before the Birds.

2019: Mitch Tawhi Thomas for Pakaru. Runner Up: Nancy Brunning for Taniwha Woman. Highly Commended: Peter Croft for Penalty. Best Play by a Māori Playwright: Mitch Tawhi Thomas for Pakaru. Best Play by a Pasifika Playwright: Benny Marama for thursdays.child. Best Play by a Woman Playwright: Nancy Brunning for Taniwha Woman

2020: Jess Sayer for This Particular Room. Runner Up: Siobhan Rosenthal for Blocked. Best Play by a Māori Playwright: Sarah Browne for Second to God. Best Play by a Pasifika Playwright: Tanya Muagututi'a for Scholars. Best Play by a Woman Playwright: Jess Sayer for This Particular Room. McNaughton South Island Play Award: Carl Nixon for An Unlikely Season

2021: Adam NZ Play Award and Best Play by a Woman Playwright: Emily Duncan for & Sons, Adam NZ Play Award Runner Up and Best Play by A Māori Playwright: Katie Wolfe for The Haka Party Incident, Highly Commended: Sam Brooks for A Rich Man and Future of the Party, Best Play by a Pasifika Playwright: Vela Manusaute for Sons of Vao, McNaughton South Island Play Award: Emily Duncan for & Sons, The Dean Parker Award: Katie Wolfe for The Haka Party Incident

2022: Maraea Rakuraku for 02 04 16 10 07 also Best Play by a Woman Playwright and Best Play by a Māori Playwright. Dean Parker Award: Eleanor Bishop and Karin McCracken for Aliens and Anorexia adapted from the book by Chris Kraus. McNaughton South Island Play Award: Emily Duncan for The Woman at the Store, adapted from the short story by Katherine Mansfield

2023: Albert Belz for Supernova, renamed Hyperspace, also Best Play by a Māori Playwright. Runner Up: Keagan Carr Fransch for Mitochondrial Eve, also Best Play by a Woman Playwright. Best Play by a Pacific Playwright: Viki Moananu for Icky. McNaughton South Island Play Award: Steven Page for Give Way – The Musical. The Dean Parker Award: Sam Brooks for Em, adapted from Emma by Jane Austen.

== Adam NZ Play Award shortlists ==
2010: Denis Edwards, Ella West, Greg McGee, Hannah McKie, Justin Eade, Lorae Parry & Pinky Agnew, Mike Hudson, and Paul Baker.

2011: Dan Cleary, Jennifer Compton, and Whiti Hereaka.

2012: Jess Sayer, Beautiful Coincidences; Joe Musaphia, The Train Set; Ken Duncum, Janet & John; Natasha Maharaj, Dirty Children; Patrick Evans, Gifted; Phillip Braithwaite, Honest to God; and Whiti Hereaka, Raw Men.

2013: Sam Brooks, And I Was Like; Michael Galvin, Give Up; Joseph Harper, atlas/mountains/dead butterflies; Alice Miller, Native Affairs; Olga Nikora, Stroika; and Bruce Clyde Thomson, Ayn Rand Has Her Way.

2014: Philip Braithwaite, Lingua Franca; Rachel Callinan, Pakehell; Justin Eade, Central Otago Man; Renee Liang, The Quiet Room; Stanley Makuwe, Footprints on Ika's Heart; Alice Miller, Three Sisters; Andrew Parker, Occupy: The Road to Joy; and Arun Subramaniam, A Moment or Two.

2015: Aroha Awarau, Officer 27; Sam Brooks, Spitting it Out; Kip Chapman, Hudson and Halls Live!; Denis Edwards, Service to Love; Pip Hall, Squeak, Squeak – Tales of the White Mouse; Nathan Joe, Who is Sada Abe? Part One: Bullfight of Love; Riwia Mackenzie-Brown, The Violet and the Huia Feather; Gavin McGibbon, Congregation; Ken Mizusawa, Why do we do what we do?; James Nokise, The Last Part; Robyn Paterson, The World's First Fight; April Phillips, Charlotte Badger: Miscreant, Mother, Mutineer!; John Smythe, Where There's a Will; and Aroha White, 2080.

2016: Carl Bland, Te Pō; Philip Braithwaite, The Atom Room; Kip Chapman, Lucky; Angie Farrow, The Politician's Wife; Miria George, The Vultures; Ralph McCubbin Howell, The Devil's Half Acre; Emma Kinane, Anahera; Tom McCrory, Smiley; Joe Musaphia, A Love Like Ours; Olga Nikora, Tumanāko; Dean Parker, Ports of Auckland; Lorae Parry, Scarlet & Gold; Vivienne Plumb, The Property Developer; Elspeth Sandys, Rogues and Vagabonds; Cian Elyse White, Te Puhi.

2017: Geoff Allen, The Taiaha and the Sabre; Carl Bland, Spirit House; Nick Brown and the cast, Paratiho; Kathryn Burnett, The Caravan; Noa Campbell, Teka or Tika; Richard De Luca, Death of a Dream; Adam Goodall, The Go-Between; Alex Lodge, Sing to Me; Alex Lodge and Cherie Jacobson, Modern Girls in Bed; Miriama McDowell, Rob Mokaraka and Jason Te Kare, Cellfish; Greg McGee, Flame; Joe Musaphia, The Gearbox; Dean Parker, Before the Next Teardrop Falls; Julianne Parkinson, The Rookie; Finnius Teppett, Cannibal.

2018: Claire Ahuriri-Dunning, Dracula; Aroha Awarau, Provocation; Sam Brooks, Turn Off the Lights and Twenty Eight Millimetres; James Cain, Movers; Emily Duncan, In Our Shoes; Chye-Ling Huang, Orientation; Justin Lewis and Jacob Rajan, Welcome to the Murder House; Vela Manusaute, Tropical Lovebirds; Arthur Meek, Land of the Moa; Joe Musaphia, Chutzpah; Dean Parker, Tutankhamun; Bruce Clyde Thomson, Stuck Pigs; James van Dyk, The Lazarus Lottery and Roy Ward, The Bright Side of my Condition.

2019: Carl Bland, Mr Red Light; Kieran Craft, Four Nights in the Green Barrow Pub; Emily Duncan, Le Sujet Parle; Rose Kirkup, Unflattering Smock; Rene Le Bas, Lloyd Dobler is Dead; Rachel Lowe, You Didn't Die, Stanley Makuwe, Black Lover; Olga Nikora, In Search of Freedom; Jenny Pattrick, Hope; Frances Steinberg, Routine Magic; Craig Thaine, Martha Mee.

2020: George Arthur, A Relatively Uneventful Evening; Ralph McCubbin Howell, Lysander's Aunty; Chye-Ling Huang, Black Tree Bridge; Hone Kouka, On Springfield Road; Olga Nikora, a short guide to staying alive; Regan Taylor, Mate; Craig Thaine, Rupture.

2021: The Hall by Ro Bright, A Rich Man by Sam Brooks, The Future of the Party by Sam Brooks, Po’ Boys and Oysters by Estelle Chout, & Sons by Emily Duncan, Back to Square One? by Anders Falstie-Jensen, The Eternal by Angie Farrow, Eleanor Crane by Alex MacDonald, Sons of Vao by Vela Manusaute, Unbelievable by Joe Musaphia, Cuckoo by Olga Nikora, The White Queen by Allen O’Leary, Pork and Poll Taxes by Talia Pua, Homemade Takeaways by Ben Wilson, The Haka Party Incident by Katie Wolfe

2022: Leaning Left, The Perfect Image and White Wedding by Sam Brooks, Blood Harmony by William Duignan, The Shit Kid by Sarah Harpur, Losing Face by Nathan Joe, How to Throw a Chinese Funeral by Jill Kwan, Cycles by Lori Leigh, The Grass is Singing by Stanley Makuwe adapted from the book by Doris Lessing, The Sun and the Wind by Tainui Tukiwaho

2023: Lads on the Island by Sam Brooks, Nicola Cheeseman is Back by Kathryn Burnett, The Valentina by Anders Falstie-Jensen, Dimensions in Black by Keagan Carr Fransch, Pōhutukawa by Maraea Rakuraku, New Gold Mountain Woman by Cassandra Tse, The Best of Tūhoe by Tainui Tukiwaho.

2024: The Odyssey by Dan Bain, The Boy Trip by Sam Brooks, This Is My Story of Us by Sam Brooks, Trojan Horse by James Cain, We’ll Always Have Paris by Paul Kalburgi, Kaveinga by Teherenui Koteka, The Ants by Alex MacDonald, Breakdown by Craig Thaine, Matenui by Tawhi Thomas, Before We Slip Beneath the Sea by Cassandra Tse.

2025: Boy Meets Man by Sam Brooks, Three Feet Under by Helen Vivienne Fletcher, #W&TCHLIST by David Geary, & Other Personal Essays by Nathan Joe, Wet by Tui Matelau, We’re Gonna Kill Billy by Alex Medland, Second Puberty by Beatrice Onions, Te Kooti Ariki Rangi Te Turuki by Maraea Rakuraku, The Consummate Professional by Andrew Todd and Cathasaigh Ó Fiannachta, Hoki Wairua Mai by Baylee Watene.
