= Emily Duncan =

New Zealand playwright

- Born: Christchurch, New Zealand
- Education: Victoria University of Wellington, Massey University, University of Otago
- Writing career
- Genre: Theatre

Emily Tess Duncan is a New Zealand playwright. She is co-founder of Prospect Park Productions, an organisation aiming “to create and produce original New Zealand theatre and collaborative projects that reach into other art forms." Duncan held the 2019 Robert Burns Fellowship at the University of Otago in Dunedin, New Zealand. She lives in Dunedin.

== Early life and education ==
Duncan was born in Christchurch but grew up in Dunedin. She completed her BA at Victoria University of Wellington and her Honours degree from Massey University. She studied acting at the Lee Strasberg Theatre Institute and at the Royal Academy of Dramatic Art summer school. In December 2016, she completed her PhD in Theatre Studies at the University of Otago, with a thesis on heterotopic playwriting.

== Career ==
Duncan began writing for theatre in 1999. That year, her one-act play Lips was runner-up in the New Zealand Young Playwrights’ Competition. Sweet Meats, "inspired by the slave poetry of the Romantic period," was performed at the Dunedin Fringe Festival in 2004. Her first full-length drama, Palliative Care, premiered at the Otago Festival of Arts in 2008.

Eliose in the Middle won the 2013 Playmarket Plays for the Young competition and appears in the 2015 anthology Here/Now: 8 Plays by Award-Winning NZ Playwrights. In her Landfall review of the anthology, Helen Watson White called attention to the “atmosphere of emotional unease” in Duncan's play and appreciated the work for being “simple, direct, and chillingly plausible." Eloise received its premiere performance at the Dunedin Public Art Gallery in September 2018.

Hold Me, which follows three individuals through four time frames, was performed in September 2016 at BATS Theatre in Wellington. Duncan received a New Playwright of the Year nomination in the 2016 Wellington Theatre Awards for this work. In 2017 she was the Inaugural Artist in Residence at St. Hilda's Collegiate School in Dunedin. While there, she wrote In Our Shoes, which was shortlisted for the 2018 Adam NZ New Play Award. Her 2014 play Le Sujet Parle received its first public performance at the 2019 Dunedin Fringe Festival. Terry MacTavish praised Duncan's “stunning script” and the play's “shocking relevancy.”

In 2016, Duncan and Helena-Jane Kilkelly formed Prospect Park Productions. Prospect Park has overseen recent productions of many of Duncan's plays, as well as the three-part podcast Dark Dunedin: Heaven Looks On.

In 2020, Duncan won the Bruce Mason Playwriting Award for her "sharp, sophisticated, passionate, quirky, evocative and unsettling" writing.

== Works ==
=== Plays ===
- Lips (1999)
- Sweet Meats (Dunedin Fringe Festival, 2004)
- Palliative Care (Otago Festival of Arts, 2008)
- Eliose in the Middle (2013; published 2015; first produced 2018)
- Le Sujet Parle (2014; Dunedin Fringe Festival, 2019)
- When You Were Mine (2015)
- Hold Me (BATS Theatre, Wellington, 2016)
- Shaken (2016 Wellington Short + Sweet Festival)
- Fallen Angels (Young and Hungry 2017 Festival of New Theatre, Wellington)
- In Our Shoes (2018)

=== Original podcast ===
- Dark Dunedin: Heaven Looks On (2018)
