= Victor Rodger =

New Zealand playwright

Victor Rodger ONZM
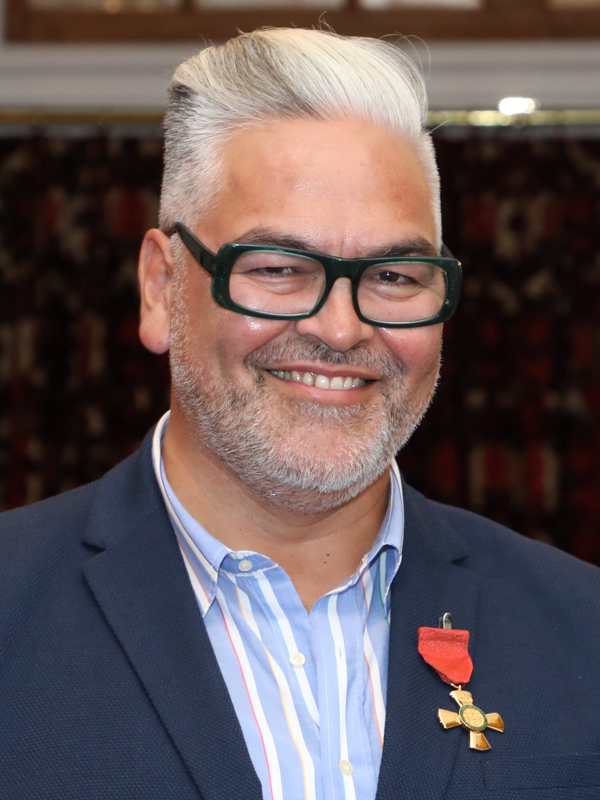
- Rodger in 2021
- Born: Victor John Rodger; 1969 (age 56–57); Christchurch, New Zealand
- Education: Toi Whakaari New Zealand Drama School
- Occupations: actor, playwright
- Writing career
- Genres: Theatre, Television

Victor John Rodger ONZM (born 1969) is a New Zealand journalist, actor and award-winning playwright of Samoan and Pākehā heritage. Rodger's play Sons won acclaim at the Chapman Tripp Theatre Awards (1998) and received the Best New Writer and Most Outstanding New New Zealand Play awards. In 2001, he won the Bruce Mason Playwriting Award. Other plays include Ranterstantrum (2002) and My Name is Gary Cooper (2007), produced and staged by Auckland Theatre Company and starred a Samoan cast including Robbie Magasiva, Anapela Polataivao, Goretti Chadwick and Kiwi actress Jennifer Ward-Lealand.

== Biography ==
Rodger was born in Christchurch in 1969. Rodger's father is from the village of Iva from Savai'i island in Samoa.

Rodger spent two years studying at Toi Whakaari, the New Zealand Drama School in Wellington graduating in 1997. Also in 1997, his play Cunning Stunts was performed in the Young and Hungry Festival at BATS Theatre in Wellington.

During 2004–2005, he studied film writing at the Maurits Binger Film Institute in Amsterdam. He gained the Fulbright-Creative New Zealand Pacific Writers' Residency (2006) based at the University of Hawaiʻi. In 2009, he was the Ursula Bethell Writer in Residence in Christchurch.

His play Ranterstantrum (2002) was commissioned for the biennial New Zealand International Festival of the Arts. His play Sons was published by Huia Publishers in 2008, and My Name Is Gary Cooper was published by Playmarket in 2012, in the anthology Urbanesia: Four Pasifika Plays. He is also a writer and a storyliner for TV soap Shortland Street.

He held the 2016 Robert Burns Fellowship at the University of Otago.

Erotic, funny and full of machete-sharp dialogue, one of our most daring contemporary playwrights offers a new insight into the steamy side of Paradise. Sian Robertson, Theatreview, 2007.

His acting roles include Stickmen (2001), Mercy Peak and a recurring role on Shortland Street as Dr. Henry Mapasua.

== Awards ==
In 2013, Rodger was awarded the Contemporary Pacific Art Award at the Creative New Zealand Arts Pasifka Awards. In the 2021 New Year Honours, he was appointed an Officer of the New Zealand Order of Merit, for services to theatre and Pacific arts.

== Selected plays ==
- Ranterstantrum (2002)
- My Name Is Gary Cooper (2007) - Auckland Theatre Company, Maidment Theatre. Director Roy Ward, set design Mark MacIntyre, costume Elizabeth Whiting. Cast: Nora Aati, Goretti Chadwick, Damien Harrison, Robbie Magasiva, Anapela Polata'ivao, Roy Snow, Jennifer Ward-Lealand, Liesha Ward Knox
- Black Faggot (2014)
- Club Paradiso (2015)
- Girl On A Corner (2015) - Auckland Fringe & Auckland Pride. Basement Theatre, Auckland. Directed by Anapela Polataivao. Cast: Amanaki Prescott
- At The Wake (2018) - Circa Theatre. Directed by Jane Yonge, designed by Sean Coyle. Cast: Lisa Harrow, Marco Alosio, Jerome Leota.
- Sons - premiered at The Court Theatre, Christchurch (1995)
- Uma Lava (2019) - First produced by FCC, at Circa Theatre, directed by Vela Manusaute. Cast: Goretti Chadwick, Mario Faumui, Anapela Polata'ivao
- Lockdown La Ronde (2020) - First produced by Toi Whakaari at BATS Theatre, directed by Jarod Rawiri.

== Selected publications ==
- 2008 Sons: Huia Publishers, 128 pages. ISBN 1-86969-303-5, ISBN 978-1-86969-303-9
- 2012 My Name Is Gary Cooper, published in Urbanesia: Four Pasifika Plays: Playmarket Play Series. ISBN 9780908607433
