= Ninna Tersman =

Swedish playwright in New Zealand and Australia

Ninna Tersman is a Swedish playwright, dramaturg and translator. She started playwrighting in 2001, and has written more than twenty plays for adults and for younger audiences. Her 2008 play, Fucking Parasites, won the Critic's Prize for Best Production of the Year, and the Adam NZ Play Award.

== Work ==
Tersman has written more than twenty plays, and writes for both adult and young audiences. She also translates plays from Swedish to English. In 2018, she dramatised the 1976 novel Maken by Gun-Britt Sundström, about the relationship between two university students. Tersman has worked as a literary manager and dramaturg at the National Swedish Touring Theatre in Sweden. She has lived in Auckland, Sydney and Stockholm.

Tersman's works have been performed by the National Swedish Touring Theatre (Riksteatern), Uppsala City Theatre, Norrbottensteatern, Regionteater Väst, Ung Scen Öst, Västerbottensteatern and by several independent productions. Recurring themes in Terman's works include "injustice, power relations and people's prejudices".

== Awards ==
In 2008, Tersman's play, Fucking Parasites, won the inaugural Adam NZ Play Award, an award conferred by Playmarket for new plays. The play, about two teenagers in an asylum seeker processing centre, was workshopped at the Pacific Playhouse in London, directed by Lorae Parry with script advisor Tanika Gupta. The play was then published as Parasites by Currency Press in Australia in 2017.

In 2012 Tersman won the Critic's Prize for Best Production of the Year for the play When Winter Stars Shine Down on Us.
