= Ralph McCubbin Howell =

New Zealand playwright, actor and theatre director

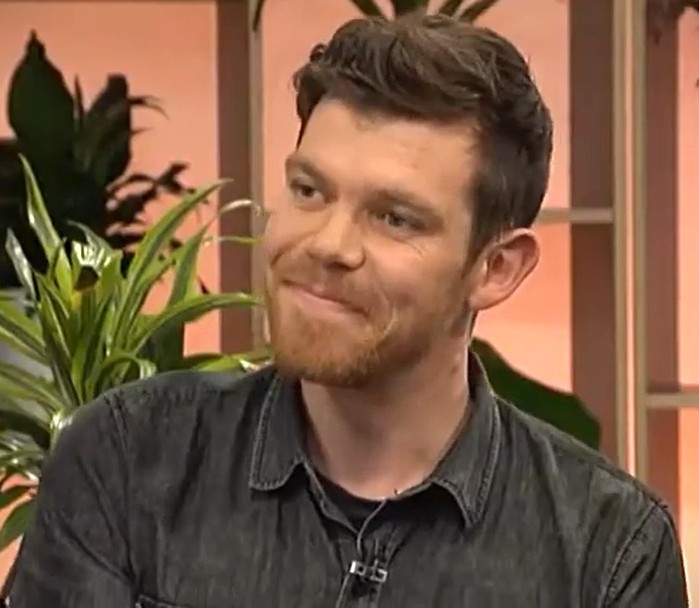
Howell in 2017

Ralph McCubbin Howell is a Wellington-based New Zealand playwright and actor. Howell was the recipient of the 2014 Bruce Mason Playwriting Award. His work The Devil's Half Acre was commissioned and produced by the 2016 New Zealand International Festival of the Arts.

Howells has a BA (Honours) in Theatre & English at Victoria University of Wellington. He also trained at the Bristol Old Vic Theatre School (UK).

Howell often performs as an actor in his own work, with roles in many initial productions of his plays including The Bookbinder, The Devil's Half Acre, The Road That Wasn't There, Broken River, and The Engine room.

Howell is the co-director along with Hannah Smith of the theatre company Trick of the Light. Their play The Road That Wasn't There won Howell an Outstanding New NZ Play in 2013 and Smith the Most Promising Director at the Wellington Theatre Awards (2023).

== Awards ==
- 2014 – Bruce Mason Playwriting Award.
- 2014 – The BookBinder: Best Theatre; Best in the Fringe; Tiki Tour Ready Award – New Zealand Fringe Festival
- 2013 – The Road That Wasn't There: Outstanding New NZ Play
- 2013 – Production of the Year – Chapman Tripp Theatre Awards Auckland Arts Festival Award – Auckland Fringe Festival 2013
- 2011 – Outstanding new New Zealand Playwright of the Year – Chapman Tripp Theatre Awards 2011
