= Pip Hall =

New Zealand writer, actor and administrator (born 1971)

Philippa Hall (born 1971) is a New Zealand stage, screen and radio script writer and actor.

== Biography ==
=== Background ===
Pip Hall is the daughter of writer Roger Hall and grew up mostly in Dunedin, New Zealand. She graduated in theatre studies and drama at the University of Otago and spent time whilst there experimenting with theatre at the Allen Hall Theatre, a working theatre space at the university. Her fellow students and contemporaries included Te Radar, Duncan Sarkies and Jesse Griffin.

=== Career ===
In the early 1990s Hall started writing for television on Gibson Group sketch shows. She went on to write plays including two plays for Young & Hungry Arts Trust at BATS Theatre in Wellington and has been a full time writer since 1995. In 2000 Hall was the co-ordinator of Young and Hungry.

Her one-act play Shudder (2003) is a popular choice to be produced in high schools in New Zealand, she has written over a dozen plays that have been produced and many were commissioned. In 2018 Auckland Theatre Company presented her stage adaptation of New Zealand’s children's novel, Under the Mountain by Maurice Gee.

Hall has written comedy, drama and documentary for television. Runaway Millionaires is the true story of a New Zealand couple Leo Gao and Kara Hurring who in 2009 received $10 million from the bank by mistake, took the money and disappeared. She says when telling a true story:

"One thing that is really interesting for me as I writer is that I try really hard not to judge any kind of behaviour. It's just my job to try and work out why they make the choices they do."

Hall is co-founder of a contemporary water ballet company, Wet Hot Beauties.

She was the president of the New Zealand Writers Guild for four years, and sat on the boards of WIFT (Women in Film and Television) and Playmarket, New Zealand's playwriters agency.

== Plays ==
- Queen B, commissioned by The Young and Hungry Arts Trust and first produced at BATS Theatre in July 1997, directed by Paula Crutchlow. Published by Playmarket.
- No Man's Land, commissioned by Allen Hall Lunchtime Theatre at University of Otago, 1999
- Shudder, commissioned by The Young and Hungry Arts Trust and first produced at BATS Theatre in July 2000, directed by David O'Donnell. Published by The Play Press.
- Red Fish, Blue Fish, first produced at Silo Theatre in 2000, directed by Rebecca Hobbs
- The Woman Who Loved a Mountain, workshop reading at the Taranaki Festival of the Arts
- Who Needs Sleep Anyway?, co-written with Roger Hall, commissioned by Plunket Society, first produced at Fortune Theatre in May 2007, directed by Conrad Newport
- Up North, first produced by Centrepoint Theatre in 2010
- The 53rd Victim, about Rachel Brooke-Taylor, a New Zealand medical editor, who eventually became the 53rd victim of the 2005 London bombings
- Ache, produced at Court Theatre in 2014, directed by Daniel Pengelly

== Film and television ==
- Shortland Street, 1998 – 2017, Writer – Television
- Skitz, 1994 – 1997, Writer, as: Various roles – television
- Telly Laughs, 1996 – 1998, Writer, as: various roles – television
- Breakfast, 1997 – ongoing, subject – television
- The Day Morris Left, 1999, As: Jo – short film
- WNTV, 2000 – 2003, Writer, creative producer – television
- Freaky, 2003, Writer – Television
- The Killian Curse, 2006, Writer – television
- Bryan and Bobby, 2008, Writer – television
- The Cult, 2009, As: Janice – television
- What Really Happened – Votes for Women, 2012, As: documentary maker – television
- The Dance Exponents – Why Does Love?, 2017, Writer – television
- The Brokenwood Mysteries, 2017 – 2018, Writer – television
- Funny As: The Story of New Zealand Comedy, 2019, Subject – television
- Runaway Millionaires, 2019, Writer – television
- One Lane Bridge, 2019, Creator, writer – television
- Jonah, 2019, Writer – television

== Awards ==
- Bruce Mason Playwriting Award Winner 2009
- Adam New Zealand Play Award - New Zealand New Play Award for The 53rd Victim, 2009
- New Zealand Writers Guild awards 2010. Runner up. The 53rd Victim
- 2018 Huawei Mate20 New Zealand Television Awards – Best Script – Drama (shared with Philip Smith): for The Dance Exponents – Why Does Love?
- 2018 Huawei Mate20 New Zealand Television Awards – Best Feature Drama: 'The Dance Exponents – Why Does Love?'
