= Apollo 13 (disambiguation) =

Apollo 13 was a 1970 lunar mission in NASA's Apollo program.

Apollo 13 may also refer to:

- Apollo 13 (film), a 1995 film
  - Apollo 13 (pinball), a pinball game
- Apollo 13: Mission Control, an interactive theater show
- Lost Moon or Apollo 13, a book by Jim Lovell
- Apollo 13 Survival, a 2024 documentary film by Peter Middleton
