= Cathy Downes =

Theatre director in New Zealand

Cathy Downes MNZM
- Born: Catherine Patricia Downes; 1951 (age 74–75)
- Education: Victoria University of Wellington; Toi Whakaari
- Occupations: Theatre director, playwright, dramaturg, actor
- Awards: Chapman Tripp Best Director Award (1996, 1998)

Catherine Patricia Downes MNZM (born 1951) is a New Zealand theatre director, actor, dramaturg and playwright. Of Māori descent, she affiliates to Ngāi Tahu. Downes wrote a one-woman play The Case of Katherine Mansfield, which she has performed more than 1000 times in six countries over twenty years. She has been the artistic director of the Court Theatre in Christchurch and the director of Downstage Theatre in Wellington. She lives on Waiheke Island and works as a freelance actor, director and playwright.

== Personal life and education ==
Downes completed a BA in English, Politics and Drama at Victoria University, and worked as a programme purchaser and film editor for TVNZ. She then earned a Certificate in Acting from the QEII Arts Council Drama School in 1973. Downes works as a freelance actor, director and playwright, and is based on Waiheke Island.

== Acting career ==
Downes spent three years acting professionally in New Zealand before travelling to Europe in 1976, where she established theatre companies in Amsterdam and London. She developed and toured Sweet Nothings, an "immensely successful satirical cabaret show" and follow-up shows Sweet Corn, Venus in Blue Jeans and The Heartache Show.

Downes had been in Brian McNeill's The Two Tigers at Four Seasons Theatre in Whanganui in 1977. She credits this with beginning her interest in Katherine Mansfield. While in Europe, Downes wrote and developed a one-woman play The Case of Katherine Mansfield, which she first performed in Holland in 1978. She has since given over 1000 performances in six countries (England, Scotland, The Netherlands, America, Australia and New Zealand) over a period of twenty years. The play won two Edinburgh Festival awards, the Festival Times Award and the Scotsman Omnibus Award at the 1979 Edinburgh Fringe Festival. It also received the ABC Australia Best Radio Play on 1981, and was nominated for a BBC World Service PYE Award for Best Radio Play.

Downes worked as part of the Nimrod Actors Company in Sydney for several years before returning to New Zealand.

She played Joan Didion in The Year of Magical Thinking at the directed by Susan Wilson in 2012, and in 2013 was in Nina Raine's Tribes at the Fortune Theatre, directed by Lara Macgregor, in which she was described as "make[ing] the absolute most of the more slender role of Beth, ... ...The audience relishes in particular her confidently explosive entrance in her underwear, battling with control freak Christopher over the kimono he insists she wear to meet the new girlfriend." In 2017 she was Helena in Roger Hall's Last Legs at the Fortune Theatre in Dunedin, in which she "fleshes out her Helena wonderfully, really engaging me". More recently, Downes played Alison in Radio New Zealand's COVID19 Lockdown Festival 2020 version of Roger Hall's Four Flat Whites in Italy.

Television roles have included playing a flatmate and a doctor respectively in sitcom Buck House, and Epidemic, and playing Eileen Horrocks on Shortland Street, a series for which she also directed in the 1990s. Downes was in both the original stage version of Robert Lord's Joyful and Triumphant, and a television adaptation made in 1993. Downes won a Sammy Award for her role in Winter of Our Dreams, an Australian drama. She played Ginny in Filthy Rich in 2016. Downes played Mitch in the 2020 BBC/TVNZ environmental teen drama Mystic.

== Directing career ==
Downes's 1996 world premiere production of Tzigane at the Downstage Theatre in Wellington won Chapman Tripp Theatre Awards for Director of the Year and Production.

In 2000, Cathy Downes was appointed as Artistic Director of the Court Theatre in Christchurch after the retirement of Elric Hooper.

Downes was Artistic Director of Downstage Theatre in Wellington from 2006 until she resigned in 2008, to be replaced by Hilary Beaton. Downes directed a 2006 production of Mum's Choir by Alison Quigan at Downstage. In 2007 Downes directed the musical Urinetown at Downstage, and in 2008 Donna Banicevich Gera's Land Without Sundays at Maidment Theatre in Auckland.

== Plays ==
Downes is a playwright. The Suffrage Centennial Trust funded Downes to adapt Rachel McAlpine's novel about Kate Sheppard, Farewell Speech, into a play. The play was published by Playmarket.

Playmarket has also published Sweet Corn, a musical about country music, written by Downes and Jane Waddell, and The Case of Katherine Mansfield. In 1993, Downes and several other women playwrights (Lorae Parry, Fiona Samuel, Jean Betts, and Vivienne Plumb) formed WOPPA (Women's Professional Playwrights Association) and established The Women's Play Press.

Downes wrote and performed a second work about Katherine Mansfield in 2013, Talking of Katherine Mansfield, which was performed at Circa Theatre in early 2013 and then toured nationwide.

== Awards and honours ==
In the Chapman Tripp Theatre Awards, Downes won New New Zealand Play of the Year in 1993 for Farewell Speech. She also won the 1996 Best Director Award for Tzigane, and won the same award in 1998 for Closer at Circa Theatre.

Downes was made a Member of the New Zealand Order of Merit in the 1998 Queen's Birthday Honours for services to the arts.
