= Stuart Hoar =

New Zealand playwright and novelist

- Born: 1957 (age 68–69); New Plymouth, New Zealand
- Education: University of Auckland
- Occupation: playwright
- Writing career
- Genres: theatre, libretti, radio plays

Stuart Hoar (born 1957) is a New Zealand playwright, teacher, novelist, radio dramatist and librettist.

== Biography ==
Hoar was born in New Plymouth and educated at James Cook High School, Manurewa, and the University of Auckland. He worked in the film industry as a sound recordist.

In 1986, his first play, Squatter, was chosen for Playmarket's National Playwrights Workshop, was produced at Mercury Theatre in 1987, and published in 1988. Influenced by Brecht, Squatter explored the dismantling of New Zealand's large land holdings by the Liberal government of the 1890s. It was determinedly non-naturalistic, using placards, direct audience address, and anachronism to subvert the idea of a "historical drama"; Hoar stated that he was "determined to annoy people". His next play, Exile (1990), satirised founding figures of New Zealand literature.

The following year, Hoar was Writer in Residence at Mercury Theatre and received a Bruce Mason Playwriting Award. In 1993, Hoar received the Robert Burns Fellowship, and during his residence in Dunedin he wrote Not So Poor (produced at the Allen Hall Theatre), based on Mary Isabella Lee's autobiography, and Yo Banfa, about Rewi Alley's time in China, as well as a radio play and research for his novel Hard Light. From 1997 to 2000 he lived in England, during which time Hard Light was published.

While living in Menton as the 2007 Katherine Mansfield fellow, Hoar wrote Pasefika, inspired by the work of the French artist Charles Méryon who had lived in the then French colony of Akaroa in the 1840s. His 2013 musical, The Great Art War, was written with composer Philip Norman and is set in 1950; the plot concerns a dispute between the Christchurch City Council and the Christchurch Art Gallery over the purchase of a Frances Hodgkins painting. Three of his most popular plays have been biopics of New Zealanders, in a relatively naturalistic style: Rutherford (2000), about the scientist Ernest Rutherford, Bright Star (1995), about the astronomer Beatrice Tinsley, and The Face Maker (2002), about the plastic surgeon Archibald McIndoe. His most recent play, Rendered, produced by the Auckland Theatre Company in 2018, deals with New Zealand's involvement in the politics of the Middle East.

Since the age of 24, Hoar has written over 30 radio plays which have been broadcast internationally. He has taught playwriting at Canterbury and Auckland universities, and currently works for Playmarket as their script advisor, and is a lecturer in the School of English and Media Studies at Massey University.

== Plays ==
- Squatter (1987) – first produced at Mercury Theatre, Auckland; published by Victoria University Press (1988)
- Scott of the Antarctic (1989) – Allen Hall, Dunedin; published in No.8 Wire:8 Plays/8 Decades (Playmarket, 2011)
- Exile (1990) – Allen Hall, Dunedin
- A Long Walk Off A Tall Rock (1991) – NZ Drama School, Wellington
- American Girl (1992) – Allen Hall, Dunedin; published in Three Radio Plays (Victoria University Press, 1989)
- The Danger of Lifts (1992) – Court Two, Christchurch
- Not So Poor (1993) – Allen Hall, Dunedin
- Yo Banfa (Gung Ho) (1993)
- Rutherford (2000) – Circa Theatre, Wellington
- The Face Maker (2002) – Circa Theatre, Wellington
- Bright Star (2005) – Circa Theatre, Wellington
- Backwards in High Heels (2006) – Court Forge, Christchurch
- The Great Art War (a musical, with composer Phillip Norman) (2013) – Court Theatre, Christchurch
- Pasefika (2010) – Circa Theatre, Wellington, 2014
- Rendered (2018) – Auckland Theatre Company

== Screenplays ==
- Lovelock

== Libretti ==
- Bitter Calm (1990) – first performed at the International Festival of Arts, Wellington, 1994
- Star Fire 1995) – an opera for primary and intermediate age school children, composer Anthony Ritchie
- Quartet (2004) – a chamber opera composed by Anthony Ritchie

== Novels ==
- Hard Light (1998), Penguin New Zealand, ISBN 978-0140275056

== Awards ==
- 1988: Writer In Residence, Mercury Theatre
- 1988: John Reid Memorial Award
- 1988: Bruce Mason Playwriting Award
- 1990: Literary Fellow, University of Auckland
- 1993: Robert Burns Fellowship, University of Otago
- 1993: Best Screenplay, New Zealand Writers’ Guild Awards for Lovelock
- 1995: Best Dramatic Production, Mobil Radio Awards
- 2000: Writer In Residence, University of Canterbury
- 2005: Writer in Residence, St Andrews College, Christchurch
- 2007: Katherine Mansfield Memorial Fellowship
- 2007: Best Radio Play, Radio New Zealand Awards for Attitude
- 2010: Adam New Zealand Play Award for Pasefika
