= David Geary =

New Zealand playwright, born 1963

- Born: 1963 (age 62–63); Feilding, New Zealand
- Education: Victoria University of Wellington, Toi Whakaari NZ Drama School
- Occupations: writer & educator
- Writing career
- Notable awards: Bruce Mason Award, Adam New Zealand Playwrights Award

David Geary (born 1963) is a Māori playwright, dramaturg, screenwriter, director, fiction writer, poet and educator from New Zealand. He is known for his plays The Learner's Stand, Lovelock's Dream Run and Pack of Girls.

== Early years ==
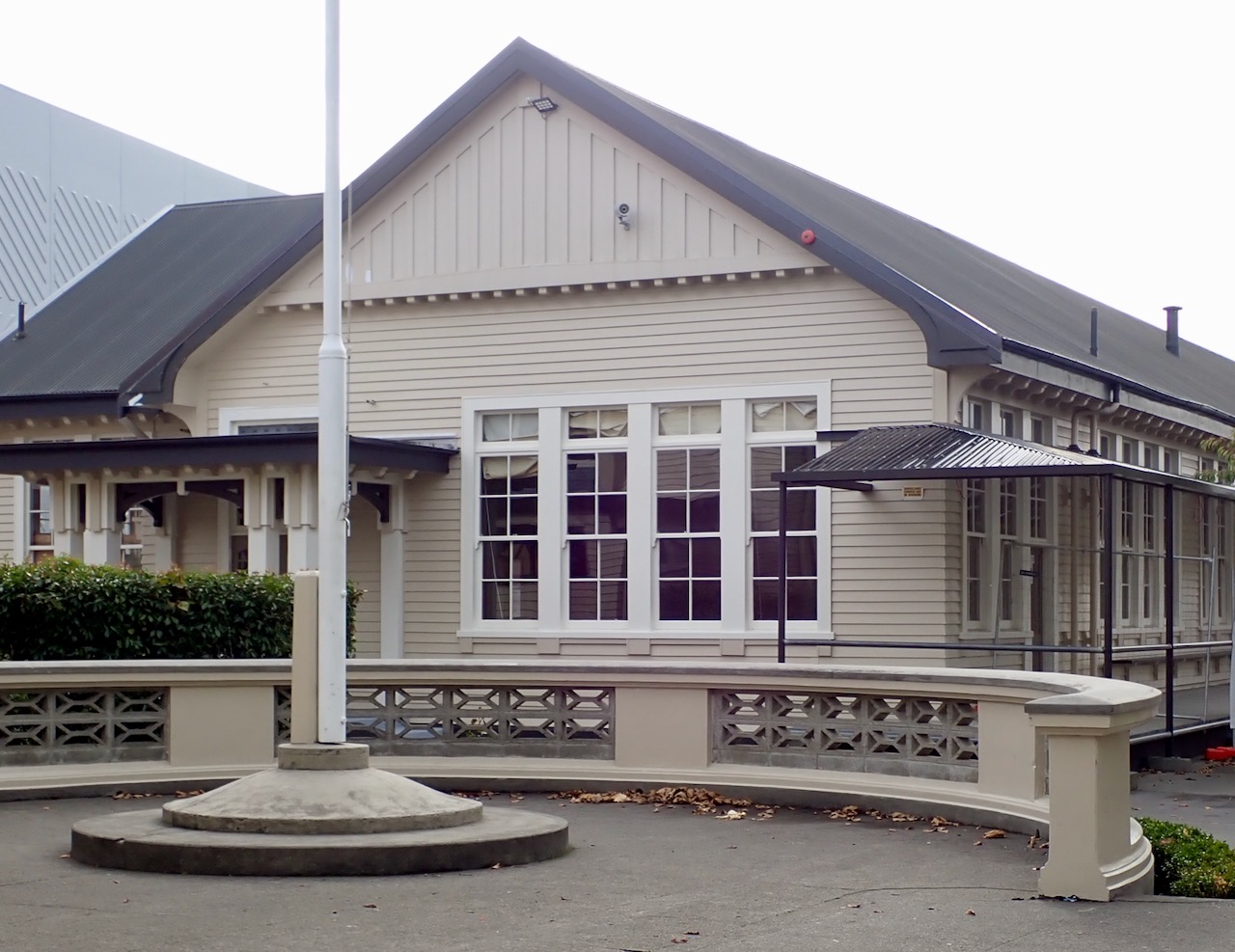
Palmerston North Boys' High School

Geary was born in Feilding, New Zealand. He is Māori and affiliates to the iwi Nga Mahanga and Taranaki. He grew up in Rangiwahia in the Manawatū region. His mother was a teacher. Geary attended Palmerston North Boys' High School, following which he attended Victoria University of Wellington and began a law degree although he later changed to arts. He subsequently studied acting, graduating in 1987 with a Diploma in Acting from Toi Whakaari New Zealand Drama School in Wellington. While still a student, Geary submitted Kandy Cigarettes to the 1988 New Zealand Playwrights’ Workshop under the pseudonym of Kurt Davidson. This was turned into revue sketches titled Gothic But Staunch and Dry, White and Friendly.

== Career ==
=== Theatre ===
In 1991, Geary's full-length play Pack of Girls (Downstage,1991) achieved critical acclaim and was performed in various venues and in the amateur theatrical network in New Zealand. It is a comedy in which a rugby widow forms a women’s rugby team. In 1993, Lovelock’s Dream Run was performed at The Watershed(Auckland Theatre Company) and also published by Victoria University Press. Geary had brought the play to the Australia and New Zealand Playwrights’ Conference in Canberra in 1990 and after the premiere, it was also presented in New Zealand and also Australia.

Other plays of Geary's include:

- The Learner’s Stand which premiered at Circa Theatre in 1995. The play is about a student who joins a sheep shearing in rural New Zealand,
- The King of Stains (BATS Theatre, 1996)
- Menu Turistico
- A Man Walks Into A Bar
- Oedipus Butchers the Classics
- QEIII/Black Betty (premiered in New Zealand in 2023)
- Mark Twain and Me in Māoriland

Working with others, Geary co-authored;

- Backstage with the Quigleys (BATS Theatre, 1992)
- The Rabbiter’s Daughter (BATS Theatre, 1994) with Mick Rose and Tim Spite
- Manawa Taua/Savage Hearts (Watershed, 1994) a collaboration with Theatre at Large.
- Ruapehu, one half of a double bill with Fiona Samuel’s Untitled presented under the title One Flesh at Downstage Theatre, 1996.

=== Television ===
Geary's television writing includes:

- Shortland Street,
- Mercy Peak
- Jackson's Wharf
- Hard Out.
- The Smell of Money (1993) as co-author and director

=== Filmography ===
Geary's film work includes:

- Baggage (author) 1993
- Shark in the Park (actor in three seasons).

== Writing ==
His short story collection, A Man of the People was published in 2003. Interviews and poetry by Geary can be found in Victoria University of Wellington online magazine Turbine. He contributed to Pūrākau : Māori Myths Retold by Māori Writers (2019).

== Teaching ==
Geary moved to Canada in 2002 where he teaches storytelling and script writing with First Nation writers at Banff Centre for Arts and Creativity. . In 2008, he was Writer in Residence at Victoria University of Wellington.

== Awards ==
- The Dominion Sunday Times Bruce Mason Playwrights’ Award,1991
- Adam Foundation Playwrights’ Award for The Learner’s Stand,1994
