= Wellington Theatre Awards =

Annual theatre awards Wellington, New Zealand

- Type: Wellington, New Zealand theatre awards
- Formerly called: Chapman Tripp Theatre Awards
- Established: 2015
- Website: https://wellingtontheatre.wixsite.com/awards

The Ngā Whakarākei O Whātaitai / Wellington Theatre Awards are the main theatre awards in New Zealand's capital city, Wellington established in 2015 after the previous awards sponsor ended their support. They are awarded annually.

The previous awards were called the Chapman Tripp Theatre Awards, established in 1992 and sponsored by law firm Chapman Tripp.

== 2023 awards ==
The 32nd Annual Wellington Theatre Awards of 2023 were presented at the Hannah Playhouse on Sunday 10 December. Funded by Wellington City Council, BATS Theatre, Taki Rua Productions, Circa Theatre and Playmarket.

Award	Winner	Notes
Mayoral Significant Contribution to Theatre	Professor David O’Donnell	
The Willem Wassenaar Most Promising Newcomer Award	Finley Hughes	The Haka Party Incident
The George Webby Most Promising Newcomer	Tessa Redman	LOVE/LOVE/LOVE/LOVE/LOVE
Lighting Designer of the Year	Isadora Lao	The Coven on Grey Street, O Le Pepelo, Le Gaio Ma Le Pala’ai, ARAWHATA
Sound Designer of the Year	Oliver Devlin	Whole New Woman
Outstanding Composer of Music	Freya Daly Sadgrove, Oliver Devlin, Samuel Austin, Ingrid Saker and Thomas Friggens	Whole New Woman
Set Designer of the Year	Dan Williams	Public Service Announcements: Election 2023
Paul Jenden Costume Designer of the Year	Meg Rollandi	The Importance of Being Earnest
The Peter Harcourt New Playwright	Freya Daly Sadgrove	Whole New Woman
New Aotearoa Play	Katie Wolfe	The Haka Party Incident
The Absolutely Most Original Production	One Night Band	
Excellence Award for Ensemble	ARAWHATA	
The Dorothy McKegg Actor of the Year	Julie Edwards	The Sun and the Wind
The Grant Tilly Performer of the Year	Erina Daniels	ONO
The Campion Accolade for Outstanding Performance	Nī Dekkers-Reihana	The Haka Party Incident
The Michele Amas Accolade for Outstanding Performance	Isobel MacKinnon	The Importance of Being Earnest
Director of the Year	Katie Wolfe	The Haka Party Incident
Community Awards		
The Kate Sheppard Grindset Award	Maeve O’Connell	
The Guardians of the Future	Save VUW Theatre – Kerryn Palmer, James Wenley, Sarah Thomasson, Lucas Neal, David O’Donnell, Paul Tozer, Rebekah De Roo and Katie Hill	
A Leading Light of Accessible Theatre	Jo Marsh	
Rangatahi Award for the Next Generation of Excellence	Wellington Young Actors Group	
The Theatre Style Icon Award	Colleen McColl	

== 2022 awards ==
Presented at a ceremony at the Hannah Playhouse on Sunday 11 December 2022. Funded by Wellington City Council, BATS Theatre, Taki Rua Productions, Circa Theatre and Playmarket.

Award	Winner	Notes
Mayoral Significant Contribution to Theatre	Rangimoana Taylor	
The Willem Wassenaar Most Promising Newcomer Award	Reon Bell	Wednesday to Come by Renee, Flames
The George Webby Most Promising Newcomer Award	Bjorn Aslund	ROXY, Sublime Interludes, The Everchanging Boy, An Honest Conversation
Lighting Designer of the Year	Brynne Tasker-Poland	Skin Tight, UNDOING
Sound Designer of the Year	Jason Wright	Destination Mars
Production Designer of the Year	Lucas Neal	Skin Tight by Gary Henderson
The Paul Jenden Costume Designer of the Year	Emma Stevens	ROXY
Outstanding Composer of Music	Tane Upjohn-Beatson	The Griegol
The Peter Harcourt New Playwright of the Year	Isaac Martyn	He Māori?
New Aotearoa Play	Carrie Rudzinski and Olivia Hall	Hysterical
The Absolutely Positively Most Original Production	First Buzzard at the Body By Elliot Vaughan	
Excellence Award for Choreography	Skin Tight by Gary Henderson	
Excellence Awards for Innovative Contribution to the Industry and/or Community	DAFT: Disabled Artist’s Festival of Theatre Performing Arts of Young People Aotearoa (PAYPA) Fresh off the Page	three awards given
The Grant Tilly Actor of the Year	Rutene Spooner	Thoroughly Modern Maui
The Dorothy McKegg Actor of the Year	Miriama McDowell	The Wasp
The Campion Accolade for Outstanding Performance	Jthan Morgan	The Mermaid, The Tiwhas, Too Much Hair, Pinocchio
The Michele Amas Accolade for Outstanding Performance	Ella Gilbert	Skin Tight by Gary Henderson
Excellence Award for Ensemble	The Swing by Helen Pearse-Otene	
Excellence Award for Theatre for Young Audiences	not awarded	
Excellence Award for Theatre for Social Change	Te Ahu Taiohi	Produced by Tāwhiri
Director of the Year	Hannah Smith	The Griegol by Hannah Smith and Ralph McCubbin Howell
Production of the Year	The Griegol by Hannah Smith and Ralph McCubbin Howell	
Community Awards Heart of Gold Awards: Sepelini Mua’au, Hannah Kelly, Nī Dekkers-Reihana, Austin Harrison, Aimee Sullivan Save the Day Award: Tony Black Community Arts Mahi Award: Voice Arts Big Mentor Energy Award: Deb McGuire Front of House Superstar Award: Harish Purohit Voice of Reason Award: Sam Brooks The Newsies Award: Simon Howard		

== 2020 awards ==
Because of the massive disruption and closure to performing arts in 2020 caused by COVID-19 the awards took a different approach with awards categories being:

- Theatre Angels - people who've really helped out individuals and collectives, especially over lockdown and have been the spirit of the industry
- Community Award Winners - with the following headings: Twenty Twenty Best Entrance, The Genuine Good Guy Award, Te Auaha Best Lockdown Mentor Award, The # Pivot to Digital Award
- Ghost Light Award Winners - to acknowledge those who used their skills to not just tend to our garden, but grow it, weed it, help us not just get through a difficult time, but used their skills and platform, as an opportunity to shed light on practises and customs no longer working for us, as practitioners, and as people.

In addition in 2020 there was the usual Mayoral Significant Contribution to Theatre which went to Carolyn Henwood.

Award	Winner	Notes
Mayoral Significant Contribution to Theatre	Carolyn Henwood	Henwood "was one of the group of 15 who founded Circa Theatre in 1976", and "was the driver in establishing the Theatre Artists Charitable Trust".
Theatre Angels	Carrie Green Eleanor Strathern George Fowler Jake Brown Jean Sergent Vanessa Imminik	For lifting people's spirits during lockdown. "For working tirelessly through lockdown contacting hundreds of Circa patrons to refund tickets" "An incredible performer, improviser, dancer, drag king extraordinaire" "Jake Brown’s rage energy, gleaming smile and beautiful openness lights up our community" "For her enormous commitment to and involvement in the Wellington theatre industry" "For going out of her way to keep everyone informed of job listings and important info"
Community Award: Twenty Twenty Best Entrance	Jennifer O'Sullivan	"Long-time NZ Improv Festival Director Jennifer O'Sullivan not only produced and directed the Festival this year, but gave birth to her first child on opening night."
Community Award: Genuine Good Guy Award	William (Bill) Paankink - Te Auaha	"an all round genuine good person in our community"
Community Award: Best Lockdown Mentor Award	Sasha Gibb	"for mentoring numerous young, emerging theatre and events artists, producers and general practitioners over lockdown"
Community Award: The # Pivot to Digital Award	Tane Hipango, Brynne Tasker-Poland and Benny Jennings	“the sole reason that BATS was able to get into livestreaming as soon as lockdown started”.
Ghost Light Award	BATS Theatre Circa Theatre Claire Mabey PANNZ - Auckland Live Tahi Festival Tanemahuta Gray & Meg Williams	"BATS once again proved to be a leader and safe haven in our community" "During the chaos of the March lockdown, this theatre stepped up as a community leader" "Claire Mabey is a force of nature in the Wellington arts community." "the PANNZ Online Hui Series provided us with a space to come together to share knowledge" "The Tahi Festival supported emerging artists, the development of new work, and honoured the whakapapa of solo performance in Aotearoa." "For their mahi and advocacy for the theatre and wider arts sectors"

== 2019 awards ==
The 2019 awards ceremony was held on Sunday 8 December at Shed 6 on the Wellington waterfront. Stella Reid was MC.

Award	Winner	Notes
The Willem Wassenaar Most Promising Newcomer Award	Sam Tippet, Stage Manager Hamlet and Ransom	
The George Webby Most Promising Newcomer Award	Tahi, New Zealand Festival of Solo Performance	
Lighting Designer of the Year	Jennifer Lal, Pakaru	
Sound Designer of the Year	Jason Wright, The Clearing	
Set Designer of the Year	Sean Coyle, Pakaru	
The Paul Jenden Costume Designer of the Year	Rose Philpott and Tori Manley-Tapu, Orchids	
The Constance Scott Kirkcaldie Award for Outstanding Composer of Music	Eden Mulholland, Orchids	
The Peter Harcourt New Playwright of the Year	Abby Howells, HarleQueen	
Outstanding New NZ Play	Mitch Tawhi Thomas, Pakaru	
The Absolutely Positively Most Original Production	Captain Cook Thinks Again, Barbarian Productions	
The Grant Tilly Actor of the Year	Jason Te Kare, Cellfish	
The Dorothy McKegg Actor of the Year	Carrie Green, Cellfish	
The Campion Accolade for Outstanding Performance	Madeline McNamara, The Attitudes – Refusing Performance	
The Michele Amas Accolade for Outstanding Performance	Karin McCracken, Yes Yes Yes	
Excellence Award for Performance Ensemble	Pakaru, Hāpai Productions	
Excellence Award for Theatre for Young Audiences	Story Studio Live 2019, Capital E National Theatre for Children	
Excellence Award for Theatre for Social Change	Yes Yes Yes, Eleanor Bishop and Karin McCracken, produced by Zanetti Productions	
Director of the Year	Jo Randerson, Captain Cook Thinks Again	
The Jack Jeffs Charitable Trust Production of the Year	Pakaru, Hāpai Productions	

== 2018 awards ==
The 2018 awards ceremony was held at Te Papa on Sunday 9 December, MCed by Jo Randerson. The event had a theme honouring 125 years of women's suffrage.

Award	Winner	Notes
The George Webby Most Promising Newcomer Award	Eleanor Strathern, Producer, A Mulled Whine	
The Willem Wassenaar Most Promising Newcomer Award	Trae Te Wiki, Acting Hine Kahāwai; Writing Beneath Skin and Bone	
The Mayoral Award for Significant Contribution to Theatre	Sue Paterson	Accepted posthumously by her son Jack Paterson.
Lighting Designer of the Year	Rachel Marlow, Wild Dogs and Peter and the Wolf	
Sound Designer of the Year	Eden Mulholland, Meremere and Rushes	
The Constance Scott Kirkaldie Outstanding Composer of Music	Robin Kelly, Valerie	
Set Designer of the Year	John Verryt, Rushes	
The Paul Jenden Costume Designer of the Year	Sheila Horton, Bloomsbury Women and the Wild Colonial Girl	
The Peter Harcourt New Playwright of the Year	Hōhepa Waitoa, He Kura E Huna Ana	
Outstanding new New Zealand Play of the Year	D. F. Mamea, Still Life with Chickens	
The Absolutely Positively Most Original Production of the Year	Jane Doe, Zanetti Productions	
The Grant Tilly Actor of the Year	Rodney Bell, Meremere	
The Dorothy McKegg Actress of the Year	Anapela Polataivao, Wild Dogs Under my Skirt	
The Campion Accolade for Outstanding Performance	Goretti Chadwick, Still Life with Chickens	
The Michele Amas Accolade for Outstanding Performance	Anya Tate-Manning, My Best Dead Friend	
Excellence Award for AV Design	Rowan Pierce, Big J Stylez and Meremere and Rushes	
Excellence Award for Puppetry	Peter and The Wolf	
Excellence Award for Community Engagement	Taurima Vibes, Breathe and All Good	
Director of the Year	Malia Johnston, Meremere and Rushes	
The Jack Jeffs Charitable Trust Production of the Year	Wild Dogs Under my Skirt, NZ Festival and FCC	"for its expert staging and cast of powerful Pasefika women"

== 2017 awards ==
The 2017 awards ceremony was held on Sunday 10 December at St James Theatre, Wellington, and MCed for a third year by James Nokise. The Mayoral Award was presented by Justin Lester.

Award	Winner	Notes
The George Webby Most Promising Newcomer	Karin McCracken, Wine Lips, Body Double	
The Willem Wassenaar Most Promising Newcomer	Lucas Neal, Gallatea, Yellow Face, Marine Snow	
The Mayoral Award for Significant Contribution to Theatre	Laughton Pattrick – composer, musical director, musician, singing teacher	"whose decades of work in theatre, as a composer and as a music teacher have enriched the lives of thousands of students, theatre makers and theatre goers."
Lighting Designer of the Year	Marcus McShane, The Father, Body Double, A Doll’s House	
Sound Designer of the Year	Lucien Johnson, Lobsters	
Set Designer of the Year	Ian Harman, A Doll’s House, Hand to God	
The Paul Jenden Costume Designer of the Year	Cara Louise Waretini, The Night Mechanics	
The Constance Scott Kirkaldie Outstanding Composer of Music	Alex Taylor, Dido and Aeneas: Recomposed	
The Peter Harcourt New Playwright of the Year	Natano Keni and Sarita So, Riverside Kings	
Outstanding New New Zealand Play	Emma Kinane, Anahera	
The Absolutely Positively Most Original Production	Dido and Aeneas: Recomposed	
The Grant Tilly Actor of the Year	Tom Clarke, Wine Lips/Hand to God	
The Dorothy McKegg Actress of the Year	Neenah Dekkers-Reihana, Anahera, The Mooncake and the Kūmara	
The Campion Accolade for Outstanding Performance	Carmel McGlone, Lobsters	
The Michele Amas Accolade for Outstanding Performance	Dawn Cheong, The Night Mechanics	
Excellence Award for Design	Tanemahuta Gray, Gillie Coxhill, Nathan McKendry, Tiki Taane, Sam Trevethick, Guy Benfield, David Strong, Rowan Pierce, Dave Spark and Matthew Knight for Tiki Taane Mahuta.	For full production design
Excellence Award for Ensemble Performance	Lobsters, Borderline Arts Ensemble	
Excellence Award for Innovative Contribution to the Industry and/or community	Te Haukāinga – Taki Rua Productions	
Director of the Year	Jane Yonge, The Basement Tapes	
The Jack Jeffs Production of the Year	Body Double	A STAB Commission, from Zanetti Productions

== 2016 awards ==
The 2016 awards ceremony was held on Sunday 11 December at Te Whaea, hosted by James Nokise.

Award	Winner	Notes
Most Promising Male Newcomer	Tom Clarke, The Devil's Half-Acre	
Most Promising Female Newcomer	Susie Berry, Jekyll and Hyde	
The George Webby Most Promising New Director Of The Year	Stella Reid, Orphans	
The Peter Harcourt Outstanding New Playwright Of The Year	Carrie Green, Man Parts – Dannevirke’s Greatest Female Tenor	
The Judges’ Wildcard	Barbarian Productions	"both for their inventive and bold performances, as well as their creative community ignition and inspiration through workshops, inclusive practices and Industry talks – diligently making society better through their work."
Lighting Designer Of The Year	Rachel Marlow, Dust Pilgrim	
Set Designer Of The Year	Poppy Serano, Dust Pilgrim	
The Paul Jenden Costume Designer Of The Year	Sopheak Seng, The Vultures	
Sound Designer Of The Year	Oliver Devlin, The Seven Sons of Supparath	
Mayor's Award For Service To Theatre	Linda Wilson, Circa Theatre	"for her tireless work behind the scenes of our beloved Circa Theatre"
The Constance Scott Kirkaldie Award For Outstanding Composer Of Music	Hayley Sproull, Vanilla Miraka	
Absolutely Positively Most Original Production Of The Year	A Trial – Barbarian Productions and Binge Culture Collective	
Outstanding New New Zealand Play Of The Year	Rob Mokaraka, Shot Bro – Confessions of a Depressed Bullet	
Supporting Actor Of The Year	Andrew Paterson, Orphans	
Supporting Actress Of The Year	Anya Tate-Manning, Hudson and Halls Live	
The Richard Campion Accolade For Outstanding Performance	Rob Mokaraka, Shot Bro – Confessions of a Depressed Bullet	
The Grant Tilly Actor Of The Year	Chris Parker, Hudson and Halls Live	
The Dorothy Mckegg Actress Of The Year	Hayley Sproull, Vanilla Miraka	
Director Of The Year	Kip Chapman & Jennifer Ward-Lealand, Hudson and Halls Live in Wellington	
Production Of The Year	Hudson and Halls Live in Wellington – Silo Theatre	"by Silo Theatre Auckland, telling a beautiful love story with humour, flamboyance and charm."

== 2015 awards ==
The 2015 awards ceremony was held on Sunday 6 December at Circa Theatre, hosted by James Nokise. The biggest winner was All Our Sons by Witi Ihimaera, produced by Taki Rua Productions and Circa Theatre. There were 21 categories of award, awarded as follows:

Award	Winner	Notes
Mayor's Award for Significant Contribution to Theatre	The Critics	"Especially noted was Laurie Atkinson (Evening Post / Dominion Post) for his 35 years service as a Wellington Theatre Reviewer"
Most Promising Male Newcomer	Andrew Paterson – The Angry Brigade	
Most Promising Female Newcomer	Carrie Green – Conversations With My Penis	
The George Webby Most Promising New Director	Miriama McDowell – Nga Pou Wahine	
The Peter Harcourt Outstanding New Playwright	Helen Vivienne Fletcher – How To Catch A Grim Reaper	
The Paul Jenden Costume Designer of the Year	Ian Harman - The Mystery of Edwin Drood	
Lighting Designer of the Year	Jen Lal – All Our Sons	
Set Designer of the Year	Ian Harman – Ache	
Sound Designer of the Year	Maaka McGregor – All Our Sons	
Most Original Production	All Our Sons – Taki Rua Productions / Circa Theatre	
The Constance Scott Kircaldie Outstanding Composer of Music	Phil Jones – The Kitchen at the End of the World	
Absolutely Positively Outstanding New New Zealand Play	Not in our Neighbourhood – Jamie McCaskill / Tikapa Productions	
Supporting Actor of the Year	Jamie McCaskill – Seed	
Supporting Actress of the Year	Brianne Kerr – Richard III	
The Richard Campion Accolade for Outstanding Performance	Renee Lyons – Ache	
The Dorothy McKegg Actress of the Year	Kali Kopae – Not In Our Neighbourhood	
The Grant Tilly Actor of the Year	Rob Mokaraka – All Our Sons	
Director of the Year	Nathaniel Lees – All Our Sons	
Production of the Year	All Our Sons – Taki Rua Productions / Circa Theatre	
Critics’ Wildcard	Tawata Productions	"for their tireless and inspired work creating Matariki Festival"
Outstanding Contribution to the Wellington Theatre	Timothy Gordon	"for his advocacy and leadership of the Theatre Awards"
Outstanding Contribution to Wellington Theatre	Neil Gray, of Chapman Tripp	"for his patronage and support of the Theatre Awards"
