= Jess Sayer =

New Zealand actress and playwright

Jess Sayer (born 12th August 1990 (Note: Age 35 as of August 2025.)) is a New Zealand actress and playwright. In 2015, she won the Bruce Mason Playwriting Award, and in 2020, she won the Adam NZ Play Award.

== Biography ==
Sayer attended Kamo High School in Whangārei, New Zealand. After high school, she began a degree in communications and journalism at Auckland University of Technology (AUT). She later became interested in theatre and moved into studying drama at The Actors' Program, graduating in 2012.

Sayer has appeared in the television soap opera Shortland Street as nurse Maeve Mullins, Filthy Rich, Dirty Laundry and the drama Runaway Millionaires. In 2016, she both wrote and acted in the web-only series Auckward Love, for TVNZ. In 2019, she appeared in the play Mr Red Light at Auckland's Aotea Centre.

As a playwright, Sayer has won the Playmarket B4 25 competition three times and has been shortlisted for the Adam NZ Play Award twice. In 2015, aged 25, she won the Bruce Mason Playwriting Award. In 2019, she was nominated for three New Zealand Writers' Guild awards (SWANZ). In 2020, she won the Adam NZ Play Award.

In July 2021, Sayer's pug, Bruce, made its debut on Shortland Street.

== Personal life ==
In July 2025, Sayer was engaged to Amanda Tito, her Shortland Street co-star and partner.
