= Jean Betts =

New Zealand playwright

Jean Betts is a New Zealand playwright, actor and director.

== Background ==
Jean Betts emigrated with her parents (both founders of Unity Theatre, London), to Christchurch, New Zealand. She obtained a degree at University of Canterbury in English Literature and New Zealand and Pacific History. Betts graduated from Toi Whakaari: the New Zealand Drama School in 1970, the inaugural year when its founder, Nola Millar, was principal. Her classmates were Elizabeth Coulter, Jennifer Ludlam, Denise Maunder, Joanna Meikle, John Otto, William (Bill) Petley, Darien Takle and Bevan Wilson.

== Career ==
She has written many plays including Revenge of the Amazons, Ophelia Thinks Harder, The Collective and The Misandrist. The Collective is a dramatisation of the story of Brecht's theatre collective based on the book "Brecht & Co" by John Fuegi.

She worked for many years as actor and director at Gateway, BATS, Downstage Theatre and Circa Theatre. She was involved with the development of professional theatre in New Zealand including as a foundation member of Playmarket (New Zealand, 1975), Circa Theatre (Wellington, 1976) and Taki Rua/The Depot Theatre (Wellington, 1983).

In 1979 Jean worked at ESTA (English Speaking Theatre Amsterdam) as actor/director, and was a founding member of the expatriate (New Zealand) group 'The Heartache and Sorrow Company' (directing) which presented work in Amsterdam, Germany, Australia, London and at the Edinburgh Festival, where the group received a 'Fringe First' and a Scotsman's Award.

In 1993 she was a founding member of WOPPA (Women's Professional Playwrights Association), set up to celebrate NZ's centenary of women's suffrage with a group of new plays by women, which premiered her play Ophelia Thinks Harder. and established The Women's Play Press with Lorae Parry, Cathy Downes, Vivienne Plumb and Fiona Samuel. Her plays Ophelia Thinks Harder, a feminist response to Shakespeare’s play Hamlet, and Revenge of the Amazons, a feminist re-vamp of A Midsummer Night's Dream, have subsequently been produced many times. In 2005 she set up a small NZ play publishing project, The Play Press (www.theplaypress.co.nz).

== Awards ==
She has been a finalist for the Susan Smith Blackburn Prize twice; and in 2015 received the Playmarket Award of $20,000 for her contribution to New Zealand Theatre.

== Plays ==
- 2014 - Genesis Falls (Finalist, Susan Smith Blackburn Prize)
- 2012 - Into the Uncanny Valley (BATS Theatre, Wellington)
- 2010 - The Man from Tamil Nadu
- 2005 - The Collective (BATS Theatre, Wellington; Finalist, Susan Smith Blackburn Prize)
- 2000 - The Misandrist (an angry comedy) - (BATS Theatre, Wellington; winner, Aoraki Festival Playwriting Award)
- 1996 - Saskia's Version (BATS Theatre, Wellington)
- 1995 - Camelot School (Allen Hall, Dunedin)
- 1995 - Strange Brew (BATS Theatre, Wellington)
- 1993 - Ophelia Thinks Harder (Circa Theatre, Wellington)
- 1990 - Digger and Nudger Try Harder (with Parry & McGlone, BATS Theatre & Taki Rua Theatre, Wellington)
- 1989 - Digger and Nudger (with Parry & McGlone, Hen's Teeth/ Circa Theatre, Wellington)
- 1986 - Leave All Fair (screenplay, written with Pons, Reid, Harper)
- 1983 - Revenge of the Amazons (Circa Theatre, Wellington)
- 1980 - Leaving Home (compiled with Barbara Ewing, performed Edinburgh Festival 1980)
- 1977 - Dada (Downstage Theatre, Wellington)
- 1976 - Fairy Tales (Theatre 87, Wellington)
- 1974 - Bloomsberries (Downstage Theatre, Wellington)
- 1973 - The Nobodies from Nowhere (co-written with Ludlam, Frost, Minifie & Wahren; Gateway Theatre, Tauranga)
