= Claire Ahuriri-Dunning =

New Zealand playwright

Claire Ahuriri-Dunning (also known as Hiria Dunning, born 1989) is a New Zealand playwright and game writer. They write community theatre and school plays, and have also published a game. Their 2016 play Daughters of Heaven was commissioned by Christchurch's Court Theatre.

== Personal life ==
Ahuriri-Dunning was born in Takapuna, Auckland, in 1989. They have Ngāti Porou, Ngāti Kahungunu, Scots, German Jewish, and Irish Catholic heritage. Ahuriri-Dunning identifies as non-binary, and uses she/her/they/them/ia pronouns. They were educated at Glenfield College, and then earned a Bachelor of Arts degree at the University of Auckland. They have worked as a software tester and a drama teacher at a high school. With their husband James Dunning, Ahuriri-Dunning is a co-founder of Pearangi Creative and Sky Bear Games.

== Plays ==
- Spilt Milk, a classroom play, published in "Stage Adventures: Eight Classroom Plays".
- A Midsummer's Nightmare, a short version of Shakespeare's A Midsummer Nights Dream, designed for teens.
- Alice's Revenge, in which an actress is murdered during casting for the role of Alice in Alice in Wonderland.
- Dracula
- Hercules, a 30 minutes interactive play for young children
- King Arthur the Pantomime.
- Shakespeare Junior, in which Shakespeare enters a playwriting competition.
- The Iliad, with James Dunning, with Homer's story in a World War I setting. Dunning-Ahuriri wrote, produced and directed the Iliad at the Pumphouse Theatre in Auckland in April 2018.

== Other work ==
In 2009, Ahuriri-Dunning wrote and directed The Virgin Party at the Drama Studio at the University of Auckland. Reviewer James Amos described it as "a fairly judicious (yet fun and very thought provoking) look at women's roles and stereotypes throughout history". The Court Theatre in Christchurch commissioned the 2016 play Daughters of Heaven, about the 1954 Parker–Hulme murder in Christchurch. Ahuriri-Dunning incorporated court transcripts and diary entries into the play.

Ahuriri-Dunning has also published a board game, Cat Capers. Their short stories have been published in Headland and AntipodeanSF.

== Awards ==
Spilt Milk won Auckland Flip the Script in 2005, and later also received a Special Mention from Playmarket's Plays for the Young competition in 2010. Dracula was shortlisted in the Adam NZ Play Awards of 2018. Ahuriri-Dunning received a New Zealand Society of Authors 2024 mentorship, and were selected as one of six recipients for the Te Papa Tupu 2024, where they intended to work on a young adult novel.
