= Bruce Mason Playwriting Award =

New Zealand theatre prize

- Genre: Literary awards
- Begins: 1983
- Frequency: Annual
- Country: New Zealand
- Inaugurated: 1983

The Bruce Mason Playwriting Award is an annual award that recognises the work of an outstanding emerging New Zealand playwright. The winner is decided by the votes of a panel of leading New Zealand artistic directors and script advisors.

The award is named after New Zealand's playwright Bruce Mason CBE (1921–1982). Mason's best known plays are The End of the Golden Weather and the Pohutukawa Tree.

The award was established by Independent Newspapers in 1983, the year after Mason's death, with assistance from Playmarket, for an amount of $2,000. It is currently a $10,000 award managed by Playmarket and has been funded over the years by the FAME Trust (Fund for Acting and Musical Endeavours), Downstage Theatre Society, Bruce Mason Trust and Rachel and David Underwood.

== Bruce Mason Playwriting Award recipients ==
- 1983 Fiona Farrell
- 1984 Simon O'Connor
- 1985 Stephanie Johnson
- 1986 Rosie Scott
- 1987 Sarah Delahunty
- 1988 Stuart Hoar
- 1989 James Beaumont
- 1990 John Broughton
- 1991 David Geary
- 1992 Hone Kouka
- 1993 Vivienne Plumb
- 1994 Duncan Sarkies
- 1995 Briar Grace-Smith
- 1996 John Vakidis
- 1997 Jo Randerson
- 1998 Oscar Kightley
- 1999 Toa Fraser
- 2000 Stuart McKenzie
- 2001 Victor Rodger
- 2002 Mitch Tawhi Thomas
- 2003–5 No award made
- 2006 Albert Belz
- 2007 Michael Galvin
- 2008 Paul Rothwell
- 2009 Pip Hall
- 2010 Eli Kent
- 2011 Arthur Meek
- 2012 Whiti Hereaka
- 2013 Jamie McCaskill
- 2014 Ralph McCubbin Howell
- 2015 Jess Sayer
- 2016 Sam Brooks
- 2017 Mīria George
- 2018 Ahi Karunaharan
- 2019 Nancy Brunning
- 2020 Emily Duncan
- 2021 Nathan Joe
- 2022 EBKM (Eleanor Bishop and Karin McCracken)
- 2023 Tainui Tukiwaho
- 2024 Leki Jackson-Bourke
- 2025 Anders Falstie-Jensen
