= Jo Randerson =

New Zealand writer, director, and performer

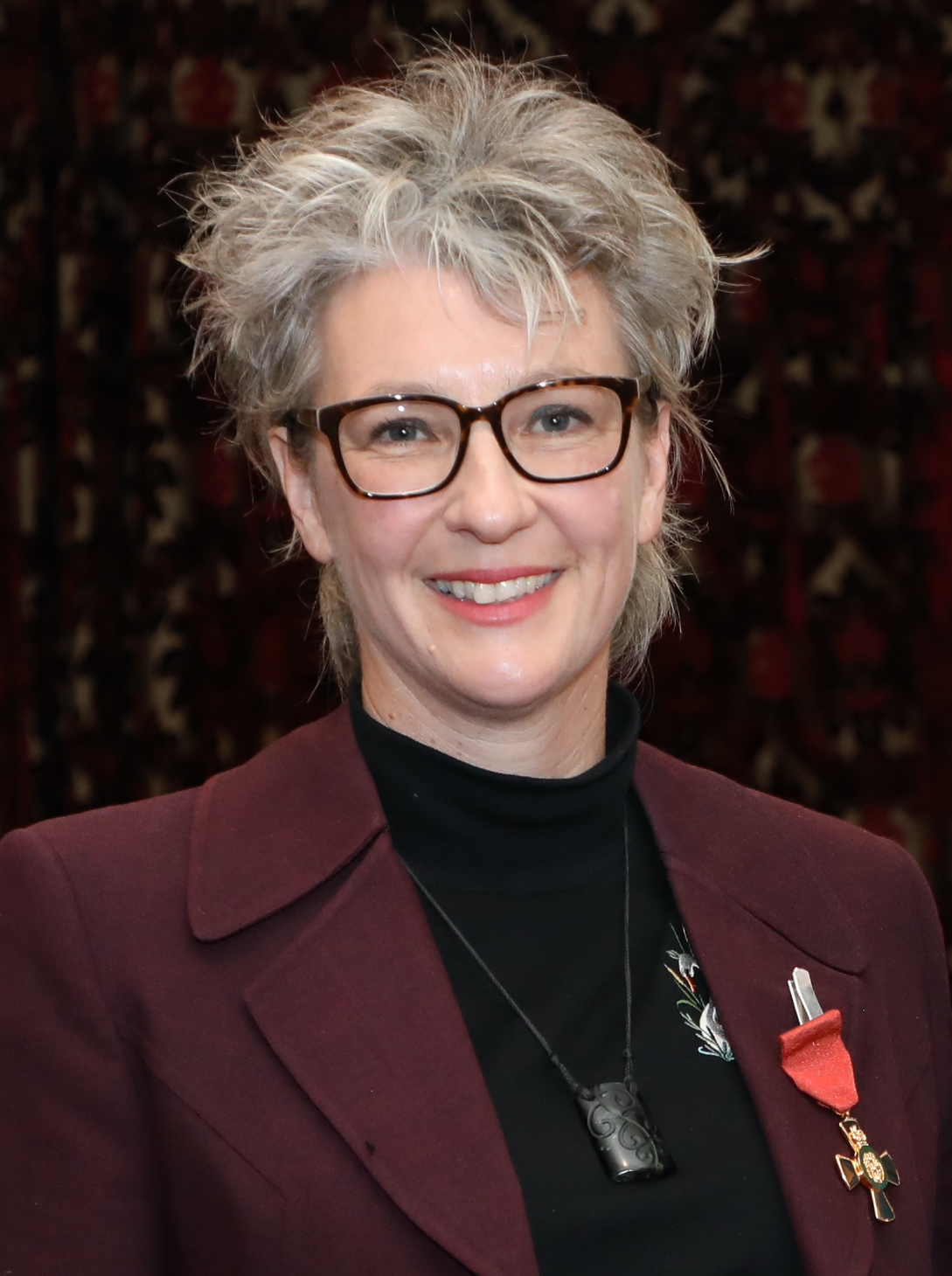
Randerson in 2021

Joanna Ruth Randerson ONZM (born 1973) is a New Zealand writer, director and performer. They (Note: Randerson uses they/them pronouns.) are the founder and artistic director of Barbarian Productions, a Wellington-based theatre production company.

== Biography ==
Randerson was born in Auckland, New Zealand, in 1973 and moved to Wellington when they were four years old. They studied at Wellington Girls' College, and then went on to Victoria University of Wellington to major in English, theatre and film. They wrote, directed and performed in theatre productions for the Victoria University of Wellington Student Drama Club. At the same time they also wrote for and performed at BATS Theatre Wellington, and made television appearances as a stand-up comedian. After graduating, they co-founded the theatre group Trouble in 1995. In 2012 Randerson finished their Master of Theatre Arts in directing from Toi Whakaari New Zealand Drama School and Victoria University of Wellington as well as participating in the Leadership New Zealand programme. Randerson was a recipient of the Arts Foundation of New Zealand New Generation Award in 2008.

Randerson's writing has been twice shortlisted for the IIML Prize (2006 and 2008), they have won Chapman Tripp Theatre Awards and were nominated for the Billy T Award in 2005. They have earned fellowships at home and abroad – they received the Robert Burns Fellowship in 2001 (Dunedin), Winston Churchill Fellow 2003 (Russia) and completed a CNZ/DOC Wild Creations Residency in 2002 at Cape Kidnappers'. Randerson won the Bruce Mason Playwriting Award in 1997 for their first play Fold (part of the Young and Hungry season at BATS). They won the Arts Foundation of New Zealand New Generation Award for Literature in 2008. Randerson's books The Keys To Hell, The Spit Children, Tales From the Netherworld and The Knot have all been critically acclaimed. Their work is characterized as dark social satire. In a review for The Keys to Hell in Landfall 209, Anna Smith wrote

Randerson's world is a "holding tank" inside which we shriek, or remain terrified and mute witnesses to the despair that is life – a theme rehearsed over and over. Provocation, not subtlety, is the writer's special effect.

In the 2021 New Year Honours, Randerson was appointed an Officer of the New Zealand Order of Merit, for services to the performing arts.

== Publications ==
- 1998 The Knot (Wedge Press, 1998)
- 1999 "The Penguin People" in The Picnic Virgin, ed. Emily Perkins (Victoria University Press, 1999)
- 2000 The Spit Children (Victoria University Press, 2000)
- 2003 "Banging Cymbal, Clanging Gong" in Red Light Means Stop (The Women's Play Press, 2003)
- 2004 The Keys to Hell (Victoria University Press, 2004)
- 2004 Fold (The Play Press, 2004), published with "shudder" by Pip Hall
- 2006 "The Sheep, the Shepherd" in The Best New Zealand Fiction, Volume Three (Vintage, 2006)
- 2006 "Everything we Know" in Are Angels OK?: The Parallel Universes of New Zealand Writers and Scientists, ed. Paul Callaghan and Bill Manhire (Victoria University Press, 2006)
- 2009 Through the Door (illustrated by Seraphine Pick), Wedge Press
- 2010 The Unforgiven Harvest/ The Lead Wait (Playmarket, 2010)
- 2012 Tales From the Netherworld (Steele Roberts, 2012)
