= Apollo 13: Mission Control =

Interactive theatre show

Apollo 13: Mission Control is an interactive theatre show about NASA's failed Apollo 13 mission.

== Premiere and touring history ==
The show premiered in October 2008 at BATS Theatre in Wellington, New Zealand and has toured Hamilton, Nelson and Auckland in New Zealand. It returned to Wellington for a season at the New Zealand International Arts Festival in 2010 and then embarked on an Australian tour beginning at the Sydney Opera House. Subsequent tours to Australia have included The Powerhouse Theater in Brisbane and The State Theater Centre in Perth.

The show made its North American debut on 21 December 2012, at the Tacoma Dome Exhibition Hall in Tacoma, Washington, United States. The following month, it toured to the Spokane Convention Center in Spokane, Washington, and the Milton Rhodes Center for the Arts in Winston-Salem, North Carolina. After 45 shows in the United States, including an extended run in Winston-Salem due to sellouts, the production returned to Wellington in March 2013.

== The experience ==
The show tells the story from the point of view of Mission Control. Audience members are seated behind working computer consoles and are allowed to flick the switches, use the working telephones, interact with the actors and hear the three astronauts through headphones. The astronauts perform their part of the show in a command module in another room in the theatre. Each night they are joined by an audience member as the "guest astronaut" and their performances are displayed on two large screens at the front of the stage and on smaller TV monitors at the consoles. An actor playing newscaster Walter Cronkite broadcasts live news updates throughout the show, interviewing audience members and astronaut James Lovell's wife Marilyn.

== Chapman Trip Theatre Awards ==
The Chapman Trip Theatre Awards were annual awards for Wellington theatre sponsored by law firm Chapman Trip, they have since been renamed the Ngā Whakarākei O Whātaitai / Wellington Theatre Awards.

- The Weta Award for Best Set Design of the Year (Nominated)
- The Montana Award for Most Original Play of the Year (Won)
- Western Audio Engineering Best Sound Design of the Year (Won)
- Gail Cown Management Award for Best Actor of the Year (Nominated)
