= Arthur Meek (playwright) =

Actor and playwright in New Zealand

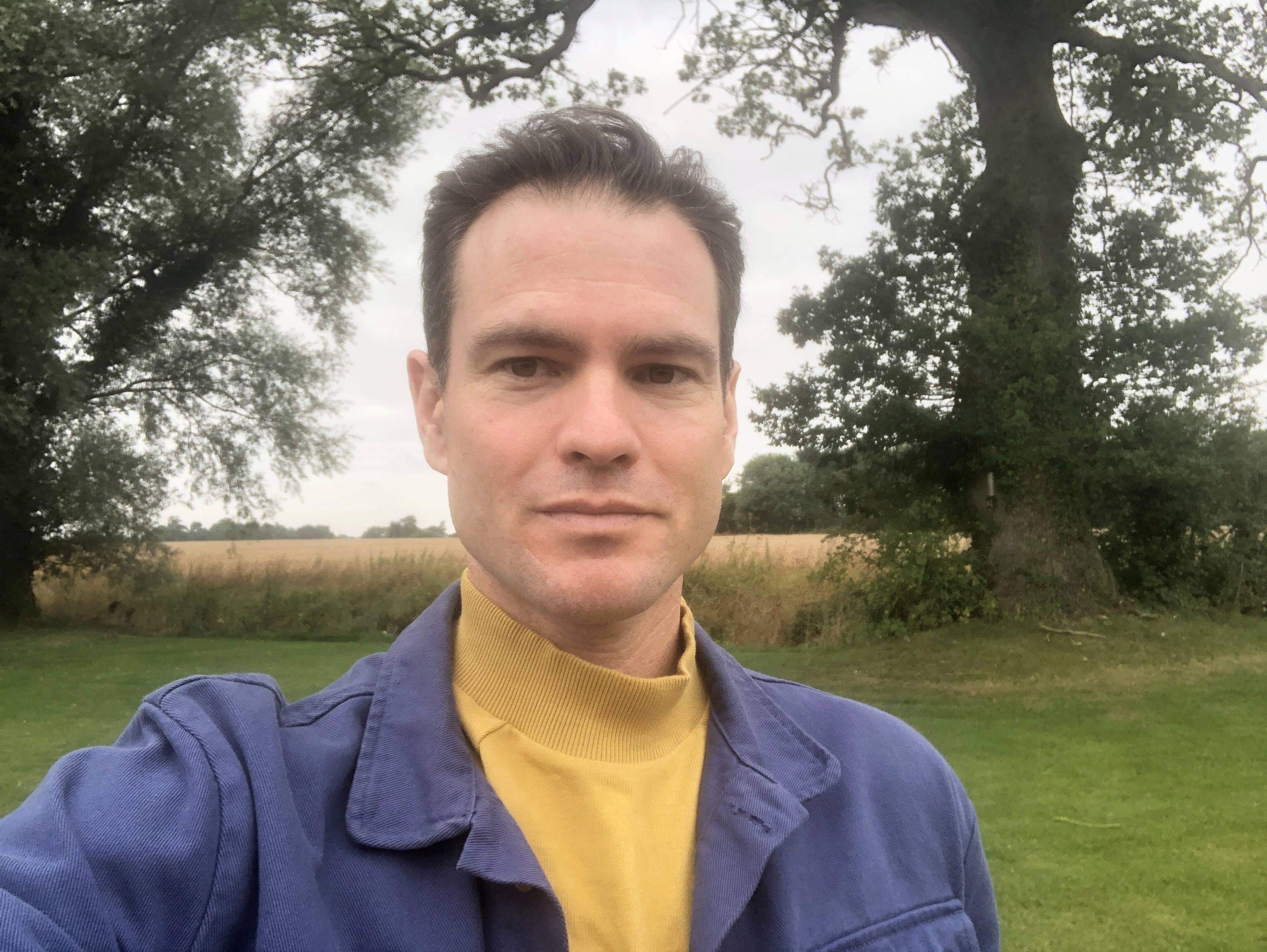
Arthur Meek in 2021

Arthur Meek, born in 1981, is a New Zealand playwright and actor. He is a graduate of Theatre Studies at Otago University and of Toi Whakaari: NZ Drama School. He graduated from Toi Whakaari with a Bachelor of Performing Arts (Acting ) in 2006.

Plays include: Charles Darwin: Collapsing Creation (2009). Fight the Fat (2011), commissioned for Allen Hall Theatre's Lunchtime Theatre programme, Sheep (2011), Dark Stars (2012), On the Upside Down of the World (2013), Trees Beneath the Lake (2014). Erewhon Revisited (2017), a co-commission between Christchurch Arts Festival and Magnetic North (Scotland).

Meek is also the co-creator of comedy band The Lonesome Buckwhips, who have performed on stage and had their own radio series, The Lonesome Buckwhips, commissioned by Radio New Zealand, and originally broadcast in July 2009.

Adaptations: On the Conditions and Possibilities of Helen Clark Taking me as her Young Lover and On the Conditions and Possibilities of Hillary Clinton Taking me as her Young Lover, and Richard Meros Salutes the Southern Man (2012), with Geoff Pinfield. Meek was the performer in each of these solo shows. As one reviewer noted, "Meek is the ideal thespian suitor to Meros' satyric satire."

As an actor, his roles have included performing in several of his own works, such as the solo show Erewhon Revisited, Dean Parker's The Hollow Men, Emily Perkins' New Zealand adaptation of Ibsen's A Doll's House and Lungs by Duncan McMillan.

== Awards ==
Meek has won the Harriet Friedlander New York Residency, the Bruce Mason Award for Playwriting in 2011, and the Summer Writer in Residence at the Michael King Writers Centre. In 2015 he was awarded the Scotland Playwright Residency by Creative New Zealand and Playwrights’ Studio Scotland.

He also won the Chapman Tripp award for Most Promising Male Newcomer of the Year in 2008, and the Peter Harcourt Award for Outstanding New Playwright of the Year in 2009 for Charles Darwin: Collapsing Creation.
