= Vivienne Plumb =

New Zealand poet, playwright, fiction writer, and editor (born 1955)

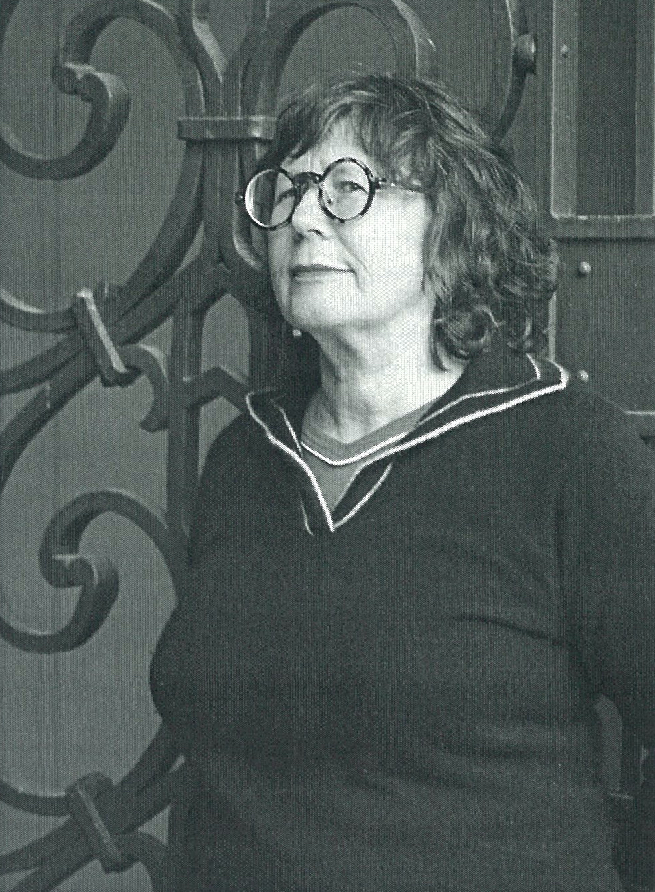
- Plumb in 2006
- Born: 4 April 1955 (age 71); Sydney, New South Wales, Australia
- Occupations: Writer and editor

Academic background
- Education: University of Wollongong
- Thesis: Hitchhiking: the travelling female body (2012)

Vivienne Christiana Gracia Plumb (born 4 April 1955) is a New Zealand poet, playwright, fiction writer, and editor.

== Biography ==
Plumb is of both New Zealand and Australian heritage. Born in Sydney, Australia, she received a Bachelor of Arts degree in English literature and a Master of Arts in creative writing from the International Institute of Modern Letters at Victoria University of Wellington, New Zealand. She has earned a Doctor of Creative Arts (DCA) degree from the University of Wollongong, Australia. Her 2012 doctoral thesis, titled Hitchhiking: the travelling female body, was in two parts: a collection of short fiction, The Glove Box and Other Stories; and an accompanying exegesis.

Plumb originally trained in acting and performance at the Victorian College of the Arts, Melbourne. After being accepted into Bill Manhire's Original Composition course in 1990 at Victoria University of Wellington, she began writing. In 1993, Plumb and several other women playwrights (Lorae Parry, Fiona Samuel, Jean Betts, and Cathy Downes) formed WOPPA (Women's Professional Playwrights Association) and established The Women's Play Press.

She currently resides in Wellington, New Zealand.

== Awards and residencies ==
Plumb has received numerous awards for her fiction, poetry, and drama.

- 1993 Bruce Mason Playwriting Award, Love Knots
- 1994 JD Stout Fellowship, Stout Research Centre, Victoria University of Wellington
- 1994 Best First Book, The Hubert Church Award for Prose, The Wife Who Spoke Japanese in Her Sleep
- 1998 First Place, New Zealand Poetry Society Annual Competition, The Tank
- 2000 Second place, New Zealand Listener National Poetry Competition, The Vegan Bar and Gaming Lounge
- 2001 Buddle Findlay Sargeson Fellowship
- 2004 Creative New Zealand, University of Iowa Writer's Residency, USA
- 2005 Varuna Retreat Fellowship, Australia
- 2005 Bronwyn Tate Memorial Award
- 2006 Writer-in-Residence, Massey University
- 2006 Writer-in-Residence, Hong Kong Baptist University
- 2009 Doctorate of Creative Arts scholarship, University of Wollongong
- 2012 Randell Cottage Creative New Zealand Writer-in-Residence
- 2014 Ursula Bethell Writer-in-Residence, University of Canterbury

== Publications ==
=== Poetry ===
- 1998 Salamanca
- 2000 Avalanche
- 2004 Nearious, poems and parables
- 2005 Scarab
- 2006 Doppelganger (with Adam Wiedemann)
- 2007 From Darkness to Light
- 2010 Crumple
- 2011 The Cheese and Onion Sandwich and other New Zealand Icons

=== Plays ===
- 1994 Love Knots
- 2008 The Cape

=== Fiction ===
- 1993 The Wife Who Spoke Japanese In her Sleep
- 1999 The Diary as a Positive in Female Adult Behaviour
- 2003 Secret City
- 2014 The Glove Box and other stories

=== Nonfiction ===
- 1991 Between These Hills (collected writing of the students of the 1990 creative writing course, Victoria University of Wellington)
- 1993 Sevensome (poetry collection by New Zealand women poets)
- 2003 Red Light Means Stop (six short solo theatre pieces by New Zealand women)
- 2013 Twenty New Zealand Playwrights
