= Albert Belz =

New Zealand actor, writer and lecturer

- Born: 1973 (age 51–52); Whakatāne, New Zealand

Albert Alexander Amahou Belz (born 1973) is a New Zealand actor, writer, and lecturer.

Belz was born in Whakatāne. He is Māori, of Ngāti Porou, Ngāpuhi, and Ngāti Pokai descent. He lived in Auckland from the age of 12, later moving to Hamilton and Wellington. In 2012 he moved to Australia, before returning to New Zealand several years later. In 2020 he completed a master's degree in creative writing at Auckland University of Technology. His master's thesis was titled Scratch the Cat.

== Acting career ==
As an actor Belz has appeared in:

- Hercules: The Legendary Journeys (1995),
- Young Hercules (1998)
- Shortland Street (1992)
- Rip Girls (2000)

== Writing ==
A professional writer for television, film and theatre since 2001, Belz has written:

- Te Maunga, a script for theatre, first performed in 2001
- Awhi Tapu, 2006, nominated for Chapman Tripp Theatre Awards. Awhi Tapu was also televised as a feature-length episode in the six-part series Atamira. It aired on Māori TV on 29 April 2012, and starred Matariki Whatarau, Tola Newbery, Kura Forrester, and James Tito.
- Yours Truly, 2006, which won Chapman Tripp Theatre Awards for Best New New Zealand Play and Most Original Play, and the Bruce Mason Playwriting Award for Best Emerging New Zealand Playwright
- Te Karakia, 2008 Wellington International Festival of the Arts
- Raising the Titanics, which won The New Zealand Listeners Best New New Zealand Play 2010
- Cradle Song, which won The Adam NZ Play Award for Best Play by a Māori Playwright 2018
- Maui Magic, a children's play
- Astroman, simultaneously produced in 2018 by the Melbourne Theatre Company (directed by Sarah Goodes) and Court Theatre, Christchurch (directed by Nancy Brunning)
- Tongue Tied, a television comedy series on Maori Television

Belz is a lecturer in performing arts and writing at Manukau Institute of Technology. He has held writing residencies in Le Quesnoy, France, the University of Waikato, Victoria University of Wellington, and the University of Canterbury. He was awarded the Robert Burns Fellowship for 2022.
