= Sam Brooks (dramatist) =

New Zealand playwright and dramatist

Sam Brooks is a New Zealand playwright and dramatist. Brooks' works have appeared on stage in Auckland and throughout New Zealand, often produced through his company, Smoke Labours Productions. Brooks' work has twice earned him the Playmarket B4 25 New Zealand Young Playwright award. He has also been nominated for the Chapman Tripp award for Outstanding New Playwright and was highly commended for the Adam New Zealand New Play of the year award. In 2014, Metro Magazine named Brooks "Auckland's Most Exciting Playwright". He won the Bruce Mason Playwriting Award in 2016. He is a contributing writer to The Spinoff, an online commentary and opinion magazine where he was previously culture editor. He has also written for Pantograph Punch, Metro magazine, and The New Zealand Herald.

== Plays ==
- A Pretty Good Year
- Actressexual
- And I Was Like
- Another Dead Fag
- Auckland Shakes
- Burn Her
- Goddess
- I Lip Sync For Him
- Jacinda (Commissioned for the 2018 Actors' Programme graduation show)
- Kissback
- Like Smoke In Here
- Mab's Room
- Queen
- Riding In Cars With (Mostly Straight) Boys
- Stutterpop
- The 21st Narcissus(Commissioned for the 2015 Young and Hungry Festival of New Theatre)
- The Construct
- The Girl and the Gay
- The Queen of the Ball
- The Sacred Prodigies
- The Winter Light
- Twenty Eight Millimetres
- Wine Lips
- Wrists
