= New Zealand Fringe Festival =

Open access performing arts festival in Wellington, New Zealand established in 1990

- Genre: Arts
- Frequency: Annually
- Locations: Wellington, New Zealand
- Inaugurated: 1990
- Previous event: 16 February 2024 - 9 March 2022
- Next event: 14 February 2025 - 8 March 2025
- Organiser: Creative Capital Arts Trust
- Website: www.fringe.co.nz

The New Zealand Fringe Festival is an open access arts festival in Wellington, New Zealand, held over several weeks in February and March each year. The 2025 programme marks the festival's 35th anniversary.

== Background ==
The festival was established in 1990 and was the first fringe festival in New Zealand. It followed fringe festival models from Edinburgh and Adelaide. The first festival was held at BATS Theatre. Initially it ran as a biennial festival to coincide with the New Zealand Festival of the Arts and was also curated by them until the Fringe Arts Trust (FAT) was formed in 1994.

The current governance is the Creative Capital Arts Trust, an umbrella organisation established in 2011 to manage New Zealand Fringe Festival and the Wellington street arts festival CubaDupa. Since 2011, NZ Fringe has grown 237.5% from 52 shows to 189 shows in 2022. The non-profit organisation is governed by a voluntary board of five trustees. Staff have included Kim Bailey (Chief Executive), Catarina Guiterrez (Marketing Director) (previously, Emlou Lattimore), Vanessa Stacey (New Zealand Fringe Festival Director) and Bianca Bailey (CubaDupa Festival Director) (previously, Drew James).

== Programme ==
New Zealand Fringe is an open access festival, providing various platforms for artists to experiment, present, and show new or refined works. The festival is held annually for three weeks during February/March. The festival often has over 150 events with can include more than 600 presentations over the three week season. It includes contemporary work in art forms including audio (podcast), busking, cabaret, comedy, circus, dance, improvisation, music, online, physical theatre, poetry, puppetry, spoken word/storytelling, theatre, visual & digital art. New Zealand Fringe is directed by Vanessa Stacey and produced and managed by the non-profit Creative Capital Arts Trust, with Kim Bailey as Chief Executive and a team of professional arts managers and seasonal staff. As of 2025, ticket sales have been increasing steadily year-on-year, representing an ongoing growth in the festival.

== Participation ==
As an open access there are no constraints on the content or presentation of the work. Participating artists pay a one-off registration fee and the New Zealand Fringe assists the artists by providing festival marketing (website, fringe programme, marketing collateral), practical information, and one-on-one advice. As a non-commissioned, open access festival, the production and presentation costs are the responsibility of the practitioner.

New Zealand Fringe Festival runs a Kakano New Works Funding scheme to foster and support new New Zealand productions. There are international festival relationships to create exchange and touring opportunities to New Zealand artists.

== Accolades ==
In January 2014, National Geographic named NZ Fringe Festival one of 10 international ‘Must Do in February Festivals’. Vibrant Gold Awards Finalist in 2022, 2023 and again in 2024.

In November 2014 NZ Fringe Festival won the Wellington International Airport Regional Community Award for Arts and Culture. It was a recent nominee for a Wellington Gold Award (2023).

=== Alumni ===
Many New Zealand arts and entertainment practitioners and companies have had shows at the New Zealand Fringe including, Flight of the Conchords, Rhys Darby, Strike Percussion, and Footnote Dance.
