= BATS Theatre =

Theatre in Wellington, New Zealand

Coordinates: 41.2936°S 174.7844°E

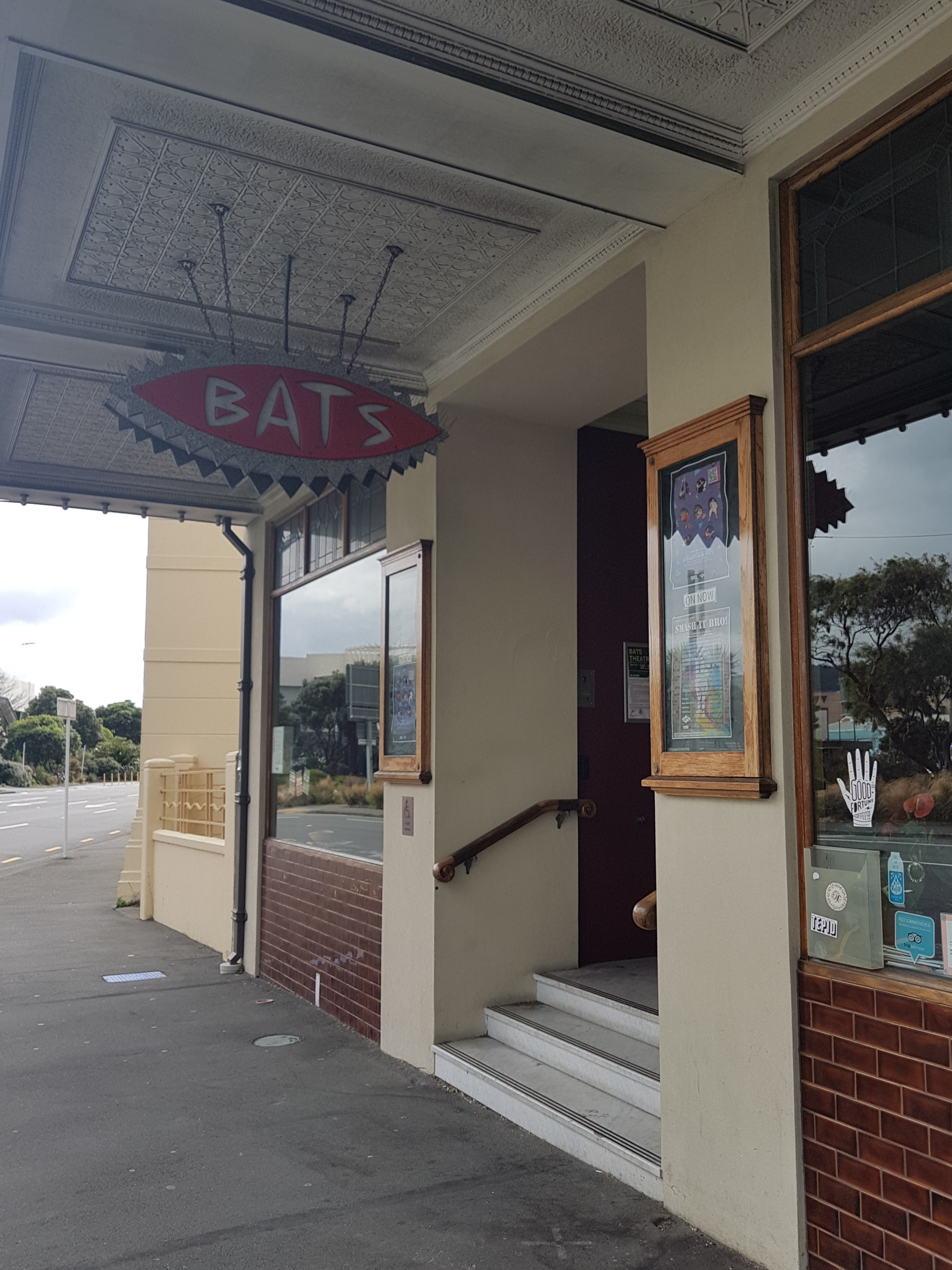
- Address: 1 Kent Terrace; Wellington; New Zealand

Construction
- Opened: 1976
- Renovated: 2013–2014

Website
- bats.co.nz

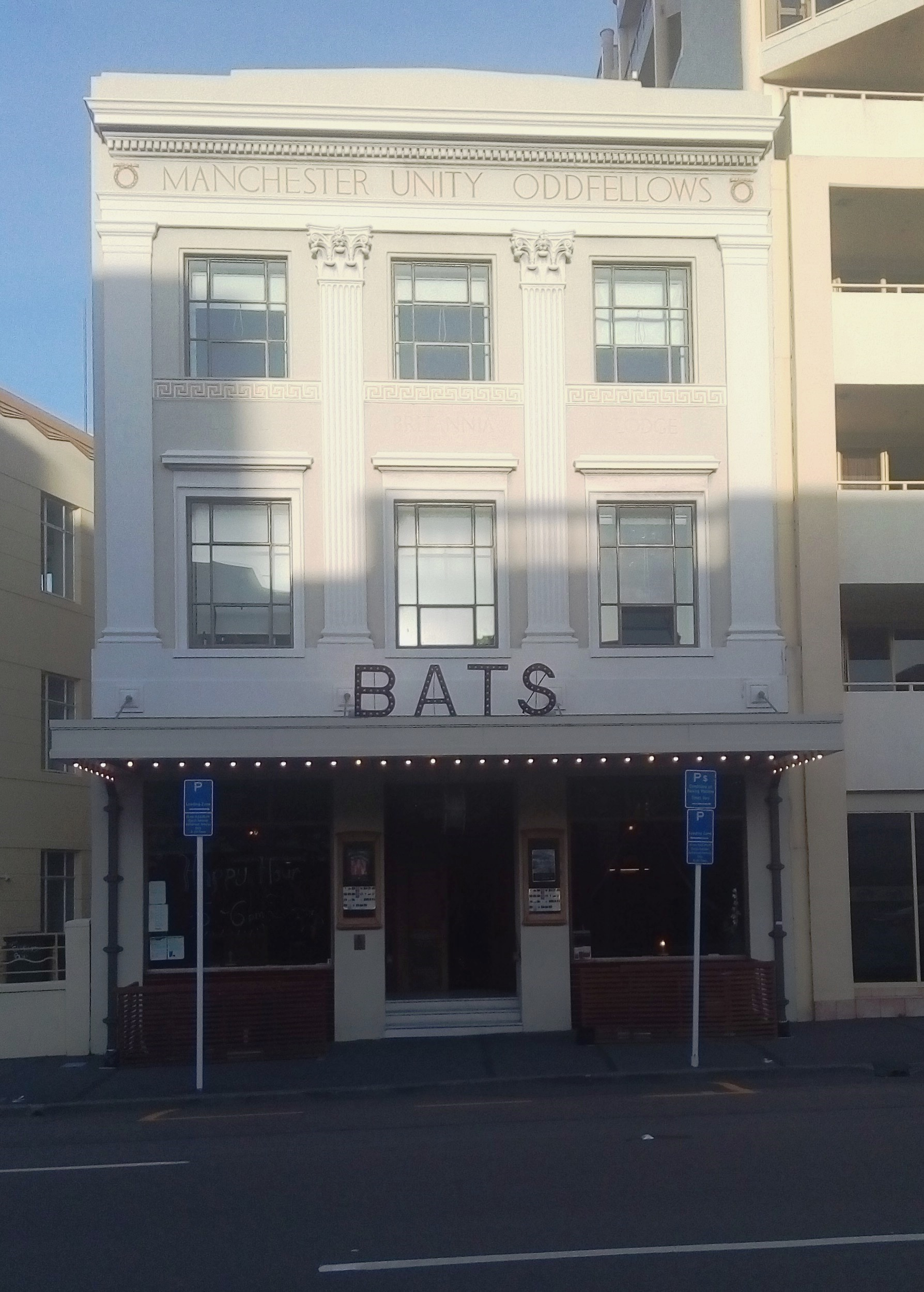
BATS Theatre

BATS Theatre is a theatre venue in Wellington, New Zealand. Initially founded as the Bats Theatre Company in 1976, then established in its current form in 1989. BATS Theatre has seen the development of many performing arts talents of New Zealand.

== History ==
=== Bane Austin Touring Society (BATS) ===
The BATS Theatre Company was founded in 1976 by Rodney Bane and David Austin. BATS is an acronym of "Bane Austin Touring Society". Initial plans were to tour one-act plays in Wairarapa, Manawatu and Wellington. Bane and Austin took over the current building at 1 Kent Terrace in the late 1970s and the building was renamed BATS Theatre in 1979.

=== BATS Theatre ===
By the 1980s, Bane and Austin had moved on to other things. BATS Theatre venue became a space that could be leased and was 're-opened as a professional theatre' in 1989 by Simon Bennett (director) and Simon Elson after months of renovations. Bennett went on to become a television director, working on shows including Shortland Street and Power Rangers. Because of their vision in setting up BATS Theatre, Bennett and Elson won the Mayor's Award for Significant Contribution to Theatre in 2014 at the Wellington Chapman Tripp Theatre Awards.

BATS celebrated its 30th anniversary in 2019 with an event called BATStravaganza Birthday at the Embassy Theatre. In an interview about the early days of BATS as a professional theatre, Simon Elson said:

"... (the) philosophy for Bats was not to have an artistic director making decisions of what shows could be staged there. Instead, the theatre helped facilitate what people wanted to stage. The theatre's small size was very important; there was less financial risk in staging new shows."

For many decades BATS Theatre operated the theatre space on the lower floor, while the building's owners Royal Antediluvian Order of Buffaloes (RAOB) used the space upstairs for regular meetings. According to playwright Ken Duncum, BATS Theatre in the 1980s "existed as a place that could be rented for 60 dollars a day – they didn't mind what you did in it". BATS was a venue for the work of young and emerging theatre practitioners. Staff members have included theatre manager Guy Boyce, appointed 1993 – 1994, who went on to Downstage Theatre, Playmarket and the Christchurch Arts Festival.

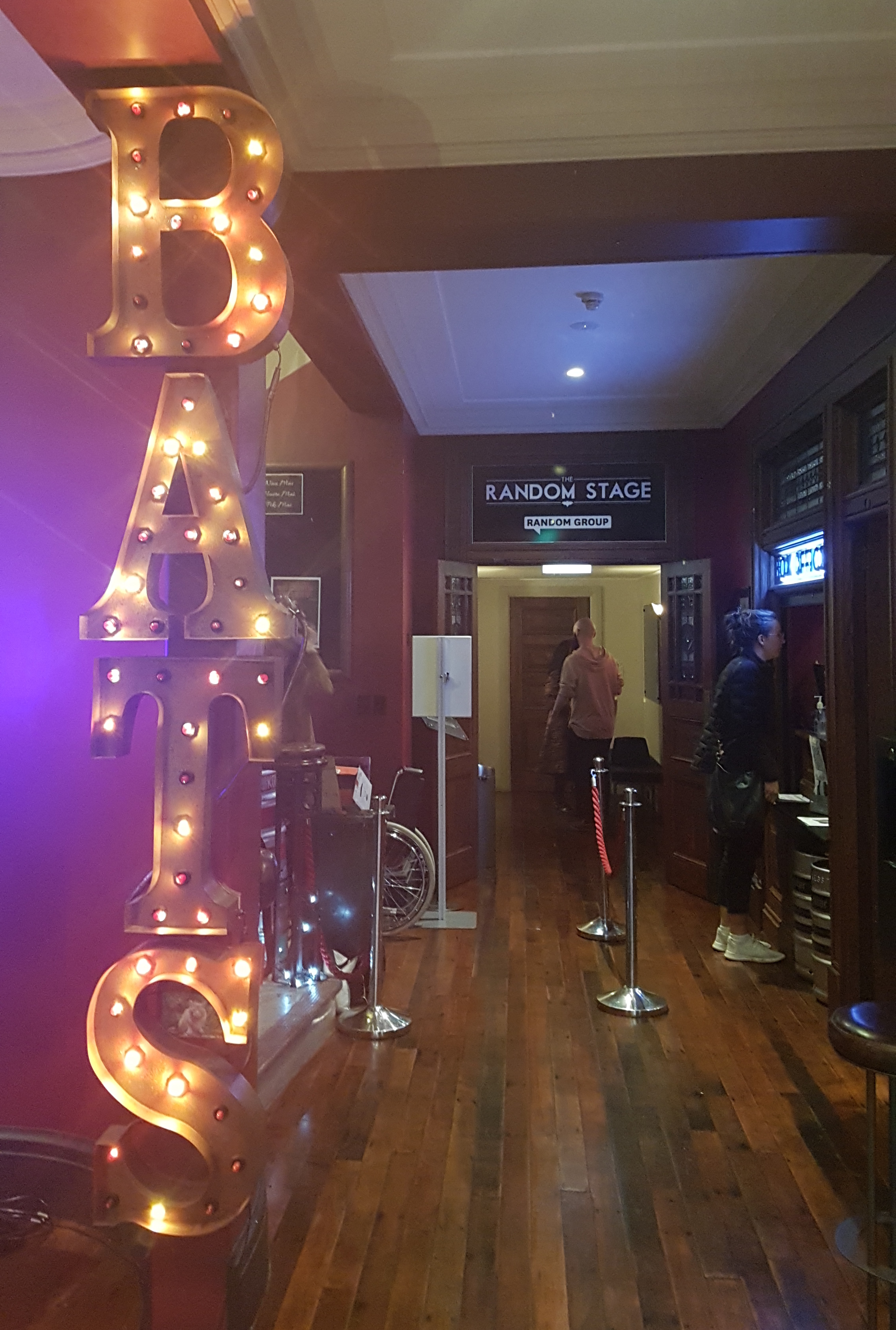
BATS Theatre view towards box office and the Random Stage entrance

=== Building ===
The building that BATS now occupies was built in 1923 for the Manchester Unity Oddfellows Society, with a meeting room upstairs and a purpose-built performance space on the ground floor for use as a dance hall and theatre venue. There were also two shops on the street front. The architects were Frederick de Jersey Clere and his son, Herbert Clere. From the 1930s – 1960s the hall was hired out for concerts, dances and other events. It became the Savage Club Hall in 1944 after the Wellington Savage Club (WSC) purchased the building. It was bought in 1976 by the Royal Antediluvian Order of Buffaloes (RAOB) to serve as the site of their lodge temple. Unity Theatre leased the ground floor theatre space from WSC and RAOB until 1978.

==== Renovations and upgrades ====
In 2011, the RAOB decided to sell the building, asking a price of $1.9 million, potentially leaving the theatre without a home. BATS attempted to purchase the building but was unable to raise the funds. The building was purchased by film director Peter Jackson and Fran Walsh later that year with the intent to provide a stable home for the theatre.

After the sale, the building underwent extensive renovation and earthquake strengthening, and was closed from February 2013 to November 2014. The renovations added two more performance spaces, which included taking over space formerly used by the ROAB. During the renovations BATS relocated to a temporary theatre space on the corner of Cuba Street and Dixon Street. This space was branded BATS: Out of Site and had a 78-seat venue and bar.

== About ==
Part of the philosophy of BATS is to be accessible, supportive of emerging artists and to allow theatrical risk with experimental work. Nearly all the productions at BATS have been New Zealand works, and their current policy is 80% New Zealand work. They programme three to six months in advance and invite anyone to propose a show. Ticket prices are kept low, ranging from $14 to $25. BATS is largely funded by Creative New Zealand and the Wellington City Council. The theatre employs six full-time staff, and uses volunteers as ushers. The BATS Theatre Board has about five volunteer board members.

=== Venue ===
BATS Theatre is at 1 Kent Terrace in the suburb of Mount Victoria. On the ground level is the larger performing space with fixed seating for 86 people, the box office and a bar. On the upper levels are two more performance spaces seating 80 and 40 people, office space, a green room, and a dressing room.

=== COVID-19 response ===
The theatre closed on 19 March 2020 in response to the COVID-19 pandemic. During its closure, it presented some live shows streamed over the internet. It has since reopened.

== Works ==
BATS Theatre has a busy programme with 60 to 70 seasons of shows each year, although after moving back into their newly renovated premises, 2015 was a particular busy year, with seasons of 101 shows. Ninety per cent of the annual programme of 60 to 70 shows are New Zealand and world premieres. Many New Zealand playwrights, actors, directors, crew and designers have mounted shows at BATS Theatre, often as a springboard to their careers.

=== Notable performances ===
Many productions which started at BATS have gone on to national and international success, including many significant new New Zealand plays. Some examples include The Sex Fiend (1989) by Stephen Sinclair and Danny Mulheron, Blue Sky Boys (1991) by Ken Duncum, Verbatim (1993) by Miranda Harcourt, Frangipani Perfume (1998) by Makerita Urale, Banging Cymbal, Clanging Gong (2002) by Jo Randerson, Vula (2002) directed by Nina Nawalowalo, And What Remains (2006) by Mīria George and Apollo 13: Mission Control (2008) by Kip Chapman. Krishnan's Dairy by Jacob Rajan, which premiered at BATS in 1997 and has toured New Zealand many times has been announced for adaptation into a feature film.

Other successful New Zealand names in theatre and comedy have presented early works at BATS, including Flight of the Conchords, Duncan Sarkies, Rhys Darby, So You're a Man, The Naked Samoans, Hone Kouka and Riwia Brown. The comedy play Benedict Cumberbatch Must Die, written by Abby Howells, premiered at BATS temporary 'Out of Site' venue in June 2014.

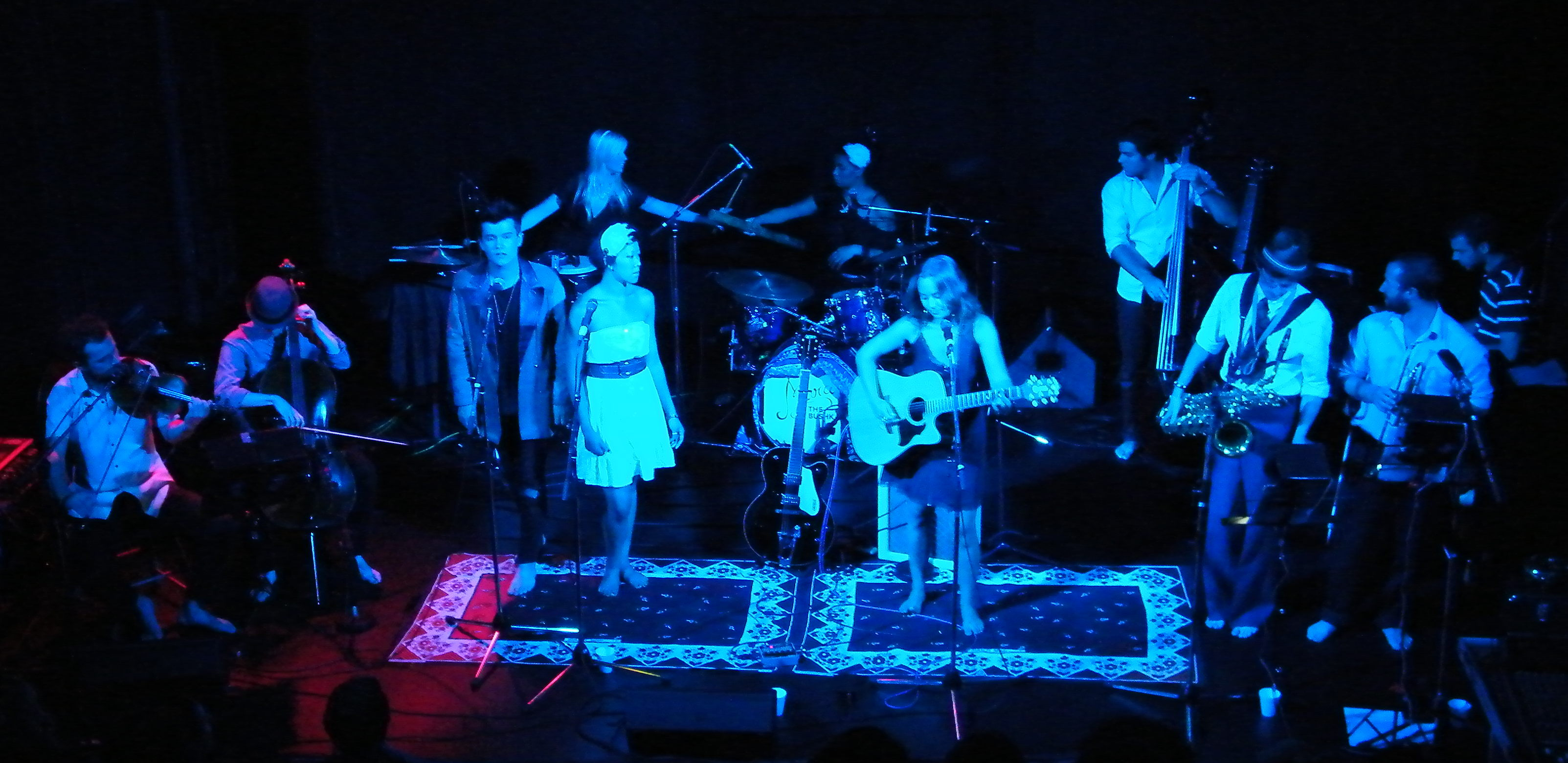
Mara and the Bushkas, BATS Theatre 2011

=== Experimental theatre and annual events ===
The venue continues to be a home to much of Wellington's young and experimental theatrical talent, with titles such as On the Conditions and Possibilities of Helen Clark Taking Me as Her Young Lover, The Intricate Art of Actually Caring and After Kafka. To encourage experimentation BATS also runs the STAB season annually (STAB is BATS backwards) which is a commissioned programme running since 1995. Some STAB productions have been at BATS and used technology as a focus such as Aaargh! The Live Movie Experience (2000) by Jemaine Clement, Bret McKenzie, Duncan Sarkies, Taika Waititi and Gentiane Lupi which was short films made live on stage. Some were off-site performances such as the immersive theatrical experience of Sniper (2004) and Pandemic (2013) by Kerryn Palmer. Use of the whole building has occurred including a site-specific theatrical installation called Demeter's Dark Ride (2005) by Madeline McNamara. The first STAB show at the newly renovated building in 2014 was Watch, directed by Uther Dean and Meg Rollandi exploring day-to-day surveillance. STAB shows feature highly in the annual Wellington Theatre Awards (formally Chapman Tripp Theatre Awards), summarised in a 2016 article as receiving twenty-eight nominations and twenty wins since STAB started in 1995.

The Young and Hungry Season was run annually at BATS from 1994 – 2017 to provide youth 15–25 years with a platform to create and experience theatre, and expanded to include works in Auckland.

BATS hosts shows each year part of the annual New Zealand Fringe Festival, and the national New Zealand Comedy Festival.
