= Playmarket =

Nonprofit organisation representing playwrights in New Zealand

Playmarket is a not-for-profit organisation providing script advisory services, representation for playwrights in New Zealand and access to New Zealand plays. Playmarket was founded in 1973 to encourage the professional production of New Zealand plays. The organisation represents many of New Zealand's theatrical writers. Playmarket is also a script development service and a publisher of plays.

== History ==
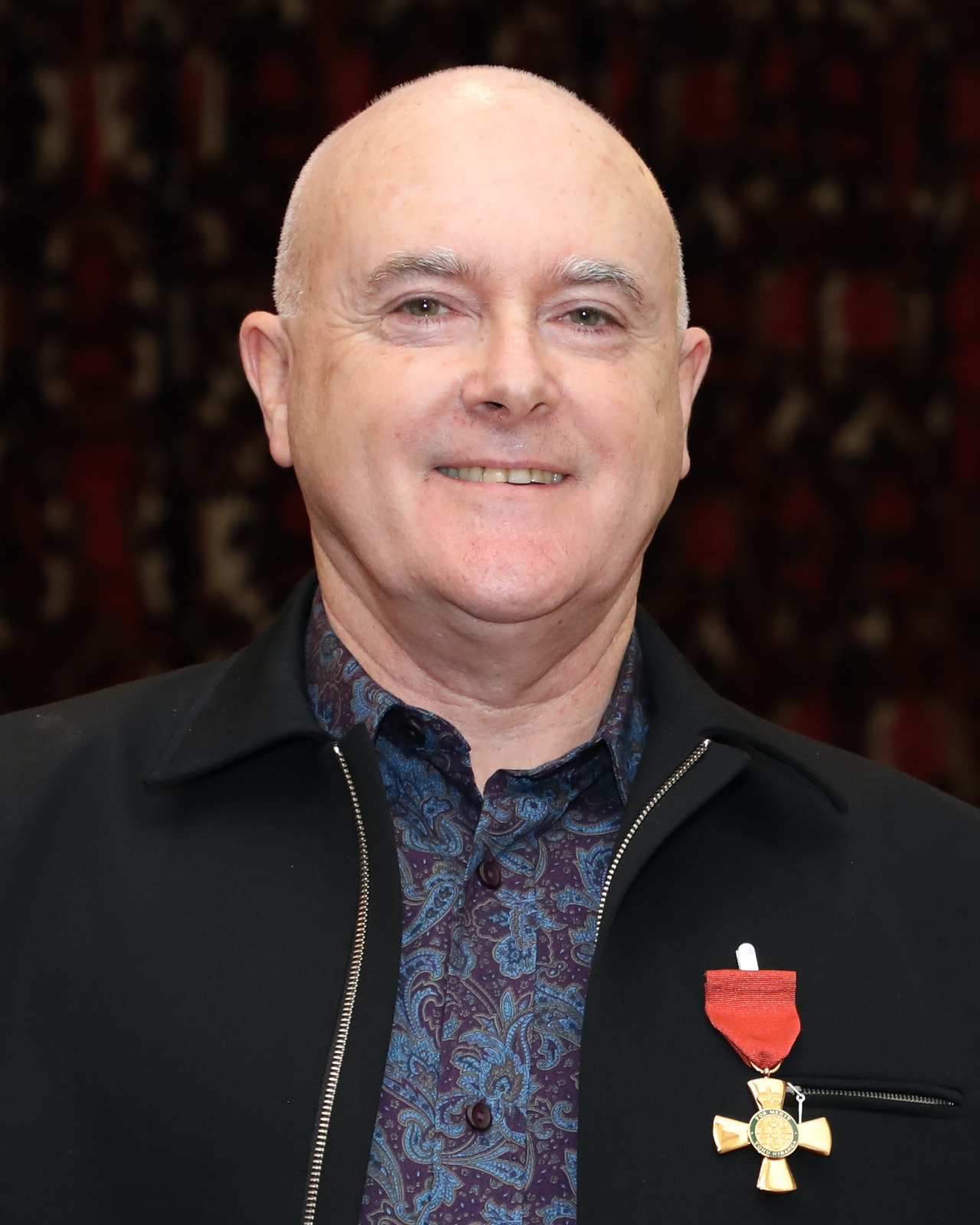
Murray Lynch director of Playmarket

Playmarket was founded by Robert Lord, Nonnita Rees, Judy Russell and Ian Fraser, initially as a script reading service. During the first eighteen months of the organisation, Playmarket licensed a total of 15 productions. They were founded in 1973 and registered as a non-profit making incorporated society in 1975.

Past directors include Mark Amery. Murray Lynch was appointed in 2010 and is the current director. Lynch was made an Officer of the New Zealand Order of Merit for services to theatre in the New Zealand 2021 New Year Honours.

In 2013 Playmarket issued over 400 performance licences annually both in New Zealand and around the world.

== Activities and structure ==
Membership Playmarket meet annually to review activities, receive the annual reports and elect a board. During the year the board meets to determine policy, establish budgets and monitor the activities of the organisation. Playmarket receives core funding from Creative New Zealand.

Playmarket receives scripts, promotes plays and playwrights and runs clinics and masterclasses for new and emerging playwrights. Services for their playwright clients include circulation of scripts to potential directors and producers (in New Zealand and overseas), distributes royalties and negotiates contracts.

Plyamarket run playwriting awards each year with announcements made at a ceremony. One of the awards is the Adam NZ Play Award for a previously unproduced new play and has a number of categories. There is also the Bruce Mason Playwriting Award, which in 2021 was won by Nathan Joe. Two other competitions are run: Playwrights b4 25 in partnership with Auckland Live and Plays for the Young in three categories of plays written for 3–8 years, 8–12 years and teenagers. Both these awards are judged by a panel.

Playmarket publishes a magazine called Playmarket Annual that formally was Playmarket NEWS and prior to that they took over the Downstage Theatre magazine Act with Playmarket publishing Act: Theatre in New Zealand from 1976 to 1986. The magazine includes a review of the previous year of theatrical activity in New Zealand.

Playmarket sells published New Zealand plays. The bookshop is available online at their website which also provides profiles of New Zealand playwrights and titles, the bookshop also has a database of unpublished scripts. For an annual fee people can become members of Playmarket.

== Published playwrights ==
Client writers and published playwrights include Roger Hall, Hone Kouka, Renee, Dave Armstrong (playwright), Gary Henderson (playwright), Jean Betts, Michelanne Forster, Robert Lord (playwright), Bruce Mason, Ken Duncum, David Geary, Alison Quigan.

== See also ==
- Culture of New Zealand

== Further reference ==
- Playmarket website
- 1992 Playmarket Directory of New Zealand Plays and Playwrights ISBN 0-908607-27-X
