= Nga Tangata Toa =

1994 play by Hone Kouka

- Original language: English, with some te reo Māori
- Written by: Hone Kouka
- Based on: The Vikings at Helgeland
- Subject: a son returns to the marae from World War I, prompting the revelation of long-held family secrets, and revenge.
- Genre: tragedy

Premiere
- Date: 1994

Nga Tangata Toa (The Warrior People) is a 1994 play by New Zealand playwright Hone Kouka. The play has themes of revenge, family honour, and long-held secrets.

Nga Tangata Toa was heralded as a masterpiece in New Zealand theatre. Directed by veteran theatre director Colin McColl (NZ Laureate), Nga Tangata Toa was first staged at Taki Rua Theatre in Wellington in 1994 and won numerous awards at the prestigious Chapman Tripp Theatre Awards. In the lead role of Rongomai was award winning actress Nancy Brunning. Nga Tangata Toa was inspired by Henrik Ibsen's play The Vikings at Helgeland.

Further productions of Nga Tangata Toa took place in Auckland in 1995, Dunedin in 1997, also involving a three night tour to Timaru, and in Wellington at Downstage Theatre in 2006.

== History ==
The play was written by Hone Kouka and first performed in Wellington in 1994. Director Colin McColl had directed Henrik Ibsen's The Vikings at Helgeland in Norway, and suggested to Kouka that he adapt it. The play moves through the traditional stages of Māori ceremony from pōwhiri (welcome) to poroporoaki (farewell). In the original staging, the audience is placed either side of a transverse stage with regular floor-to-ceiling posts, reminiscent of a wharenui (meeting-house), and a mirror was placed so that the audience could see itself. In the 2006 revival, Kouka added that a karakia (prayer) be offered before the final curtain-call, in accordance with Māori tikanga, to "close the door" to the spirit-world that had been opened by Rongomai's death.

The play was published by Victoria University Press in 1994, with notes on the characters and first production details.

== Characters ==
- Paikea – rangatira (leader) of the hapū (sub-tribe)
- Te Riri – Paikea's youngest son, aged about 15 years
- Te Wai – Paikea's daughter
- Taneatua – Te Wai's husband
- Wi (William) – Taneatua's close friend, from when they were whalers together
- Rongomai – Wi's wife, Paikea's niece and foster daughter
- Rose – Paikea's daughter-in-law
- Houhou (Tom) – Rongomai's child

== Synopsis ==
The play is set in 1919, shortly after the end of the First World War. Taneatua, who has been serving with the Pioneer Battalion in Europe, returns as a hero. Te Wai meets Taneatua in Auckland to travel back to Onehora (a fictional place on the East Coast) with him. During the journey, Te Wai shows Taneatua a letter from her sister Rongomai, revealing that Rongomai and Wi will be at Onehora. Taneatua checks that Te Wai still has a pounamu he gave her, and is reassured that nobody has seen she has it. He wants her to give the pounamu back to him so he can get rid of it, but she refuses because he won't tell her why it is bad luck.

On a sheep station in the Kaikōura Ranges in the South Island. Rose has a letter from Kahu, her husband who was killed during the war. The letter describes how as a child Kahu had seen the death of Rongomai's father, Whai. Paikea could have saved Whai from drowning but did not even try. Rongomai reveals that she knew this version of events as a child but had forgotten. Rose has told Rongomai of Kahu's letter because she is seeking revenge for having been thrown off the marae by Paikea when Kahu died. Rongomai decides to avenge her father's death.

On the beach in Onehora, Paikea and Te Riri are practising the taiaha with rākau. Paikea admonishes Te Riri for getting angry. Te Riri wants to be like his brothers, nga tangata toa (the warrior people) but he is too young and small to have fought in the war. He performs a haka but gets breathless doing it. The following day at the beach, Rongomai, Wi and their son Houhou are waiting for dawn before approaching the marae. Wi explains to Houhou that Rongomai had not returned for any of her uncles' funerals, nor kept in touch with anyone except Te Wai, so it is strange she has been in a hurry to get back this time. Wi and Rongomai discuss how Wi had saved Taneatua's life when they were whaling together. Entering the marae, Rongomai insists they take Rose with them, despite Paikea's protestations. Rongomai promises to find some herbs to help Te Riri with his breathing.

During the pōwhiri, Taneatua gives his bayonet as koha (gift). Taneatua asks Te Wai for the pounamu again. He explains that on the night he and Wi left Onehora for the war, they had got drunk and determined not to leave without a wife. Rongomai had announced no one could marry her unless they could creep into her room without waking her. Wi had silently killed the two dogs that guarded Rongomai and so the two had married. Taneatua reveals now that it was he that killed the dogs on Wi's behalf and also spent the night with Rongomai, who he says was drunk and thought he was Wi. Taneatua took Rongomai's pounamu, which he gave to Te Wai. Te Wai is happy that Taneatua chose to marry her instead of Rongomai, and refuses to return the pounamu.

During the night, Taneatua, Te Riri and Rongomai all have premonitions of their own death.

At the feast, Paikea has gone for a walk on the beach. Rongomai insults Paikea, and although the others choose to ignore it, Te Riri cannot, and Rongomai and Te Riri fight with rākau. Wi takes over from Rongomai, but Te Riri becomes breathless, and Wi and Te Wai ask Rongomai to help him with herbs. After ordering everyone but Rose to leave, Rongomai gets her revenge on Paikea by letting Te Riri die without assistance. A week after Te Riri's tangi (funeral), the women are arguing while planting potatoes. Paikea is sick with grief and refusing to eat. Rongomai reveals that she knows Paikea let her father drown, and Te Riri's death is her revenge. Te Wai shows Rongomai her pounamu, to reveal the trick that Taneatua and Wi played on the night the dogs were killed.

Te Wai and Taneatua persuade Paikea not to give up on life. Rongomai enchants Taneatua, and persuades Wi to challenge him. Rose tells Rongomai she knows that Rongomai is trying to harm Taneatua, and the two decide to burn down the marae. Te Wai and Rongomai meet on the beach, Rongomai is seeing ghosts, her curse has turned on her. The marae burns. Taneatua stops Rongomai walking into the sea, and she asks him to come away with her. He refuses and she stabs him with the bayonet. Rongomai walks into the sea, called by her tīpuna.

== Productions ==
| Production | Date | Crew | Cast |
|---|---|---|---|
| Taki Rua Theatre, Alpha Street, Wellington | 25 May 1994 | Director: Colin McColl Dramaturg: Halldis Hoaas Designer: Dorita Hannah Music: Gareth Farr Lighting: Helen Todd | Paikea: Apirana Taylor Te Riri: Shimpal Lelisi Te Wai: Erina Toi-Paku Taneatua: Jim Moriarty Wi: Matthew Chamberlain Rongomai: Nancy Brunning Rose: Hera Dunleavy Houhou: Samuel Toia/Tyson Day |
| Watershed Theatre, Auckland, by Taki Rua Productions | 10 November 1995 – 2 December 1995 | Director: Colin McColl | Taneatua: Cliff Curtis Rongomai: Nancy Brunning Rose: Hera Dunleavy Wi: Simon Ferry Te Riri: Shimpal Lelisi |
| The Globe Theatre, Dunedin, by Kilimogo Productions, Dunedin | 4–12 July 1997 | Co-Directors: Rangimoana Taylor and Hilary Halba | Awatea Edwin Erina Daniels Cindy Diver David O'Donnnell |
| Timaru Playhouse in Timaru, by Kilimogo Productions | 12–15 December 1997 | as per Dunedin production | as per Dunedin production |
| Downstage Theatre, Wellington, by Taki Rua productions | 18 Oct 2006 to 4 Nov 2006 | Director: James Beaumont Set designer: Tracey Monastra Lighting: Martyn Roberts Sound: Stephen Gallagher Costumes: Zoe Fox | Paikea: Calvin Tuteao Te Riri: Nepia Takuira-Mita Te Wai: Olivia Robinson Taneatua: Rob Mokaraka Wi: Matt Saville Rongomai: Erina Daniels Rose: Miranda Manasiadis |

== Critical reception ==
The Evening Post said of the original production of the play that "Kouka has written a brooding, intense and complex epic tragedy that is both enormously challenging and satisfying." "Nga Tangata Toa's exploration of utu, of loyalty-driven revenge, and its no-win outcomes (as old as ancient Greek and Roman theatre, very present in Shakespeare's tragedies and Jacobean theatre's most popular genre) has far more relevance and resonance than anyone would wish." For Laurie Atkinson of the Dominion Post, it is "one of the best Māori plays in my opinion because it does not attempt to contain or water down the fiery emotional forces that drive the central characters, and it tells a melodramatic story with a daring flamboyant style that uses both English and Māori to telling effect".

Of the original production Brunning's performance as Rongomai was especially noted. Atkinson called her "this Lady Macbeth of the marae smoulders with dark passions and her hatred...is blood-chilling". It was noted that despite the violence of her actions, Brunning was able to garner sympathy for Rongomai's situation. To Susan Budd, Brunning gave an "incandescent performance". Carnegie and O'Donnell assert that it is through creating sympathy for the character of Rongomai, based on the villain Hjordis, that Kouka changes Ibsen's melodrama into a "full-blown tragedy".

Reviews of the 2006 Downstage production Monastra's set was seen as "strangely straight-edged", and "(too) austere", although Atkinson considered it had the necessary classical simplicity. Lynn Freeman considered that "the play screams out for atmosphere and menace".

== Awards ==
Nga Tangata Toa won the New New Zealand Play of the Year award at the 1994 Chapman Tripp Theatre Awards, as well as the Taki Rua Production of the Year award. Dorita Hannah won the Costume Designer of the Year award.
