= Taki Rua =

New Zealand theatre organisation

Taki Rua Productions
- Formation: 1983; 43 years ago
- Headquarters: Te Whanganui-a-Tara Wellington
- Fields: Contemporary Māori theatre
- Kahukura Chief Executive: Tānemahuta Gray, Ngāi Tahu, Rangitāne, Waikato
- Website: www.takirua.co.nz/about

Taki Rua is a theatre organisation based in Wellington, New Zealand that has produced many contemporary Māori theatre productions. Taki Rua has been going since 1983 and has had several name changes over that time including The New Depot, Depot Theatre and Taki Rua / The Depot. The full current name is Taki Rua Productions. Since inception the mission of Taki Rua has been to showcase work from New Zealand. Because of this and the longevity of Taki Rua many significant New Zealand actors, directors, writers, designers and producers have part of the history including Riwia Brown, Nathaniel Lees, Rachel House, James Ashcroft and Taika Waititi.

== Background ==
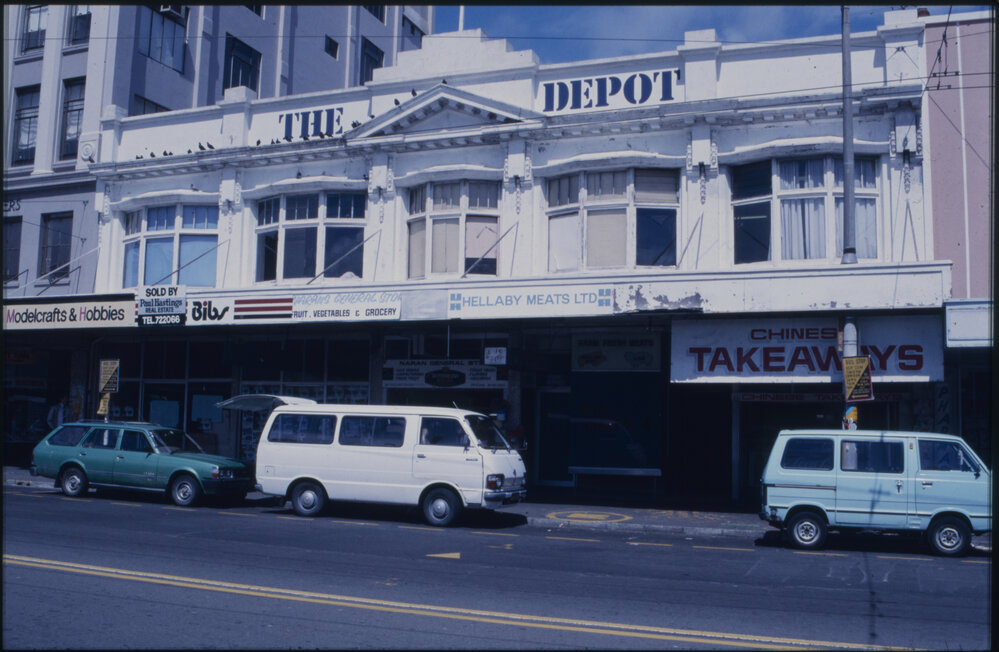
The Depot, Wellington March 1993

Taki Rua started in Wellington in 1983 when a group took over The Depot, a second performance space that Downstage Theatre had set up a year previously, they changed the name to the New Depot. This collective group was Colin McColl, Jean Betts, Philippa Campbell, Fiona Johnstone, Alyson Baker, Richard Mudford, Phillip Mann and John Banas. Colin McColl when interviewed in 2013 says about the start, "We wanted primarily something for New Zealand writers and also Māori and Pacific Island writers. That was the initial vision." In that year about 15 shows were presented including a late-night satirical cabaret by Rangimoana Taylor and Asking For It written and directed by New Zealand feminist playwright Renee.

The New Depot was run as a cooperative with the people involved in each show taking the box office risk. At the end of 1985 the New Depot moved to an upstairs premises in Alpha Street at the back of Courtenay Place.

Two members of the co-operative, Maori poet and playwright Roma Potiki and actress Dulcie Smart, co-wrote a proposal to the QEII Arts Council for funding to enable the theatre to become bi-cultural. In 1992 The Depot Theatre became Taki Rua The Depot. and then in 1994 to just Taki Rua. Former director of Taki Rua and playwright Hone Kouka says of the name, "Taki Rua is a weaving pattern and means to go in twos - signifying the bi-cultural aspect of the theatre."

Taki Rua as a venue closed in 1997 and changed to operating purely as a production company, focusing on touring and presenting works in other venues. The name changed to Taki Rua Productions, and is still running under this name although mostly referred to as Taki Rua.

The loss of a venue as a home base for collectives to come together was mourned by the theatre community, with a reflection written in the 2013 publication Playmarket 40. In 2016 Taki Rua joined with Māori theatre company Tawata Productions and Pacific theatre company The Conch, to set up a new home base but not a performance venue in Wellington called Te Haukāinga. In 2020 Te Haukāinga was shared by Taki Rua, The Māori Sidesteps, The Performance Arcade and Te Hau Tūtū.

In 2021 the staff of Taki Rua include the Kahukura / Chief Executive, Tānemahuta Gray, Kaiwhakahaere Matua / General Manager, Nathan McKendry and Pou Tikanga Mātauranga Māori, Pekaira Jude Rei. Their Ngā Kaiurungi / Board Members are Toni Huata, Tama Kirikiri, Simon Garrett, Trish Stevenson, Adrian Wagner, Tolis Papazoglou, Jamie Ferguson, Pearl Sidwell, Roimata Kirikiri and Patrick Hape.

A film documenting the history of Taki Rua, Taki Rua Theatre - Breaking Barriers, directed by Whētu Fala was released in 2024.

== Kaumātua ==
Experienced practitioners 'elders' were named as kaumātua of Taki Rua. They gave guidance and support and were both Māori and Pākehā. Over the years this group of respected people included Tungia Baker, John Tahuparae, Wi Kuki Kaa, Bob Wiki, Rona Bailey, Keri Kaa and Sunny Amey.

== Significant Moments ==
The Māori theatre group Te Ohu Whakaari involving writers Rowley Habib (Rore Hapipi), Hone Tuwhare, Riwia Brown and Apirana Taylor were part of the early Taki Rua days.

Le Matau (The Fish Hook) was presented at the New Depot in 1984, the first Samoan language play to be performed in New Zealand, by the group Taotahi Ma Uo. Written by Stephen Sinclair and Samson Samasoni.

The play Kohanga by Apirana Taylor was produced in 1986 about current issue of the establishment of Kohanga Reo in New Zealand reflecting the political stories in many Māori plays of the time.

Theatrical New Zealand band The Front Lawn performed in October 1987 two years after they formed. They had a distinctive New Zealand voice which coincidentally influenced playwright Hone Kouka in the mid-1980s, who was also later to be the director of Taki Rua.

Early Māori theatre companies Te Ika a Maui and Te Ohu Whakaari under the directorship of Jim Moriarty present a programme of Māori theatre at the Depot for Wellington's International Arts Festival in 1990 including Māori plays by Bruce Stewart and John Broughton. This initiated the concept of Theatre Marae and is part of the beginning of the longest running Māori theatre company Te Rākau Hua o te Wao Tapu led by Jim Moriarty.

The seed of Taki Rua as a Māori production company happens in 1994 with the establishment of a theatre company called Te Ropu Whakaari with the mission to showcase new Māori work.

On 25 May 1994, Taki Rua Theatre held the first performance of Hone Kouka's play Nga Tangata Toa. The cast included Jim Moriarty as Taneatua, Shimpal Lelisi as Te Riri, Nancy Brunning as Rongomai, and Apirana Taylor as Paikea.

1995 was the year of the first annual Te Reo Māori Season, theatre in Te Reo Māori. Touring to rural iwi-based communities and marae with the Te Reo Māori performances is a significant achievement, and these tours are still going.

Think of a Garden written by John Kneubuhl and directed by Nathaniel Lees presented at Taki Rua on Alpha Street won three awards at the Chapman Tripp Theatre Awards in 1995, including an acting award for Sima Urale.

In 2000 Rachel House won an award for her outstanding performance in Taki Rua's play Women Far Walking by Witi Ihimaera.

The comedy The Untold Tales of Māui by the Humour Beasts, Taika Waititi and Jermaine Clement was produced by Taki Rua and toured New Zealand over 2003 and 2004. A 2004 review states, "simple yet sophisticated, flippant yet strangely relevant and affirming."

The first play performed in te reo Māori for adult rather than child audiences to tour New Zealand, He Kura E Huna Ana, premiered at the Forge at the Court Theatre in 1995 in a development season.

In 2015 Taki Rua produced Briar Grace-Smiths' play Ngā Pou Wahine twenty years after the first presentation at Taki Rua in 1995. The new version was the directing debut for Miriama McDowell and the solo debut of Kura Forrester. In 1995 it was directed by Nancy Brunning and performed by Rachel House.
