= Mokaraka =

Mokaraka is a surname. Notable people with the surname include:

- Karl Mokaraka (born 1976 or 1977), New Zealand political candidate and heckler
- Rob Mokaraka, New Zealand playwright and actor
