= Rangimoana Taylor =

New Zealand theatre director, actor and storyteller

- Citizenship: New Zealand
- Education: Toi Whakaari
- Occupations: Theatre director and actor
- Notable work: Founder of theatre companies Te Ohu Whakaari and Kilimogo Productions
- Relatives: Apirana Taylor (brother), Riwia Brown (sister)

Rangimoana Taylor is an actor, theatre director, storyteller from New Zealand with more than 35 years in the industry. He has performed nationally and internationally and was the lead in the feature film Hook Line and Sinker (2011). He was an intrinsic part of three Māori theatre companies, Te Ohu Whakaari and Taki Rua in Wellington and Kilimogo Productions in Dunedin.

== Biography ==
Rangimoana Taylor was born in Wellington. His mother was Reremoana Taylor (Shelford). His father Melvin Taylor was a journalist and worked in the diplomatic service. Taylor is affiliated with the iwi Ngāti Porou, Te Whānau a Apanui and Taranaki. The secondary school he attended was Onslow College in Wellington.

Taylor's first screen acting role was on the first funded New Zealand television series Pukemanu in 1972. Taylor graduated from Toi Whakaari New Zealand Drama School in 1975 with a Diploma in Acting and was one of the first Māori graduates. Taylor upgraded his qualification to a Bachelor of Performing Arts (Acting) in 2004. Taylor was one of the key people who developed the style of Marae-Theatre, incorporating cultural concepts and values into the performance space. As an educator Taylor also taught at Toi Whakaari New Zealand Drama School.

Taylor founded contemporary Māori Theatre company Te Ohu Whakaari in the 1980s which was a collective that created shows based on their experiences and issues they felt important. Some of the plays of Te Ohu Whakaari were written by Taylors siblings Apirana Taylor and Riwia Brown and included Kohanga (1986) about Māori language revival and kohanga reo. Te Ohu Whakaari toured New Zealand for fifteen years and presented in theatres, marae and schools.

He was also one of the important contributors to Taki Rua Theatre in Wellington which became a venue for bi-cultural contemporary theatre in the country during the 1980s and 1990s and is a national platform for contemporary Māori theatre.

In the 1990s, Taylor collaborated with Cindy Diver, Awatea Edwin and Hilary Halba to form a bi-cultural theatre company Kilimogo Productions in Dunedin, with Māori and Pākehā traditions present in the process and the performance form. As part of Kilimogo Productions in Dunedin and Timaru Taylor co-produced and co-directed with Hilary Halba Nga Tangata Toa by Hone Kouka in 1997.

As a storyteller, Taylor has presented at the National American Storytelling Conference (1997) at Jonesborough, Tennessee and in Brazil in 1998.

Taylor acted along Kirk Torrance and Temuera Morrison a recurring role in the BBC America Mystery drama mini-series Tatau (2015). His lead role in the film Hook Line and Sinker (2011) was part of an ensemble performance alongside others including Geraldine Brophy and Kate Harcourt. Taylor plays a truck diver who can no longer work due to eye disease.

In 2022, Taylor received the Mayoral Award for Outstanding Contribution to Theatre at the Wellington Theatre Awards.

In 2023, Rangimoana Taylor was honoured with Te Tohu Aroha mō Te Arikinui Dame Te Atairangikaahu, the Supreme Award in the annual Te Waka Toi Awards which are the premier awards in 'recognition of leadership, excellence and outstanding contribution to Ngā Toi Māori (Māori arts)'.

== Performance ==
Selected acting roles in film, television and theatre.

Year	Title	Role	Production company / Director	Notes	Ref
2016	Great Maidens Blush	Kaumatua	Torchlight Films, dir. Andrea Bosshard	Feature film	
2015	Tatau	Ati	Tatau Productions Ltd / BBC2	TV drama	
2011	Hook, Line and Sinker	PJ (lead)	Torchlight Productions, dir. Andrea Bosshard and Shane Loader	Feature film	
2009	Kaitangata Twitch	Grandpa	KT Productions, dir. Yvonne McKay	TV drama	
2008	Paradise Cafe		Gibson Group	TV drama	
2008	Waimarie	Matiu	4 Winds Films, dir. Katie Wolfe	Short film	
2008	Taking the Waewae Express	Dad	Torchlight Productions, dir. Andrea Bosshard and Shane Loader	Feature film	
2005	Hamlet	Polonius	Fortune Theatre, dir. David O'Donnell	Theatre	
2004	Cherish by Ken Duncum	William	Wow Productions, dir. Lisa Warrington	Theatre	
2003	Home Fires by Hone Kouka	Jacob	Taki Rua, dir. Nancy Brunning	Theatre	
1997	Legend of William Tell		Cloud 9 Productions	TV drama	
1976	Mortimers Patch		TVNZ	TV drama	
1993 - 1994	Kids TV		TVNZ	TV drama	
1972	Pukemanu		TVNZ	TV drama	

== Personal life ==
Taylor is the brother of leading Māori poet and performance artist Apirana Taylor and writer Riwia Brown, the award-winning screenwriter of the New Zealand movie Once Were Warriors. He lives in Wellington with his partner, activist, counsellor, and celebrant Bill Logan, who helped lead the campaign for Homosexual Law Reform in the early 1980s.
