= Kilimogo Productions =

New Zealand theatre collective

Kilimogo Productions is bicultural theatre collective based in Dunedin that was founded in 1995 or 1996.

== Background ==
The founders of Kilimogo Productions include Rangimoana Taylor, Cindy Diver and Hilary Halba. The intention was to look at theatre from both a Māori and Pākehā perspective. Founding member Taylor says of this in an interview with Halba, "I sometimes think we go quite painfully, as equals, but we discuss everything."

== Productions ==
=== Ngā Tangata Toa ===
Nga Tangata Toa (1997) by Hone Kouka. The play started with the Māori ritual of a karanga and haka pōwhiri blurring reality for the audience with this experience that bring a host group and a visitor group together and many in the audience would have experienced in different settings, overall the structure of the play was formed with the framework of a meeting on a marae.

=== Whaea Kairau ===
Two years after presenting Nga Tangata Toa Kilimogo presented Rangimoana Taylor’s brothers play, Whaea Kairau: Mother Hundred-Eater (July 1999) by Apirana Taylor at the Otago Museum. This play references Brecht's play Mother Courage and Her Children. In Apirina's re-telling the central character is an Irish women in New Zealand during battles and war at the beginning of settler colonisation starting in the 1840s.

Title	Author	Venue	Year	Notes	Ref.
Nga Tangata Toa	Hone Kouka	Globe Theatre (Dunedin)	1997 (Jul)		
Nga Tangata Toa	Hone Kouka	Playhouse Theatre (Timaru)	1997 (Dec)		
Tuatara		Allen Hall Theatre (Dunedin)	1998		
Whaea Kairau: Mother Hundred Eater	Apirana Taylor	Otago Museum (Dunedin)	1999		
Mauri Tu		Globe Theatre (Dunedin)	2003		
Homefires	Hone Kouka	Fortune Studio (Dunedin)	2001		
Blue Smoke	Rawiri Paratene, Murray Lynch	Ruby in the Dust (Dunedin)	2002	In partnership with Wow! Productions	
