= Colin McColl (director) =

New Zealand actor and director

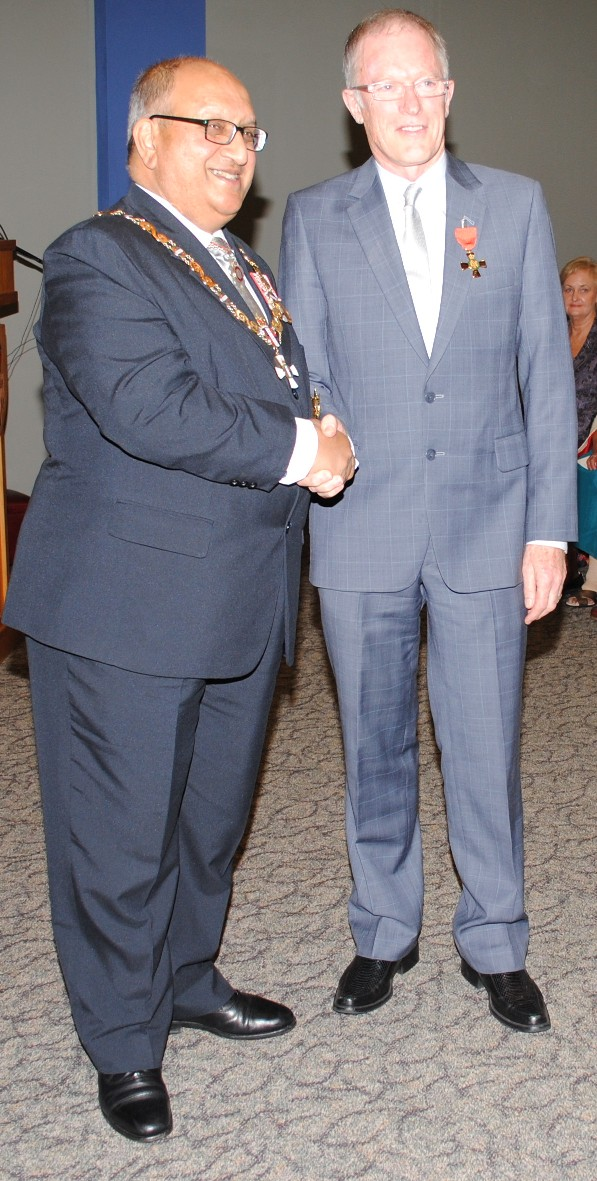
McColl (right), after his investiture as an Officer of the New Zealand Order of Merit by the governor-general, Sir Anand Satyanand, in 2010

Colin William McColl ONZM (born 1948) is a New Zealand director in theatre, opera and television. He is a leading figure in the world of professional theatre in the country, winning numerous awards as well as working internationally with major national companies. McColl's career spans more than 30 years in the performing arts where he has also been an actor and a producer. He has won Best Director at the Chapman Tripp Theatre Awards three times, received the prestigious Arts Laureate Award in 2007 and was made an Officer of the New Zealand Order of Merit in 2010. McColl was born in Naenae, Lower Hutt.

Since 2003, he has been the artistic director of Auckland Theatre Company, this tenure ends after 18 years in 2021.

== Career ==
As a theatre director, McColl has directed more than 50 plays. He is the only New Zealand director who has been invited to showcase a production at the official Edinburgh Festival. Award-winning productions include A Doll’s House (1993), Rosencrantz and Guildenstern are Dead (2000) and Who’s Afraid of Virginia Woolf (2002).

McColl was educated at the Canterbury Academy of Dramatic Art. Early in his career, he worked as an actor in England and in the late 1970s moved to Australia where he became artistic director at Hole in the Wall Theatre in Perth and project director for Sydney's Toe Truck Theatre's Outback projects. He returned to New Zealand, where he held the position of director of the Wellington Performing Arts Centre. McColl played a major role in the growth of Māori and Pacific Islands theatre in New Zealand. In 1983, he became one of the founders of Taki Rua Theatre (formerly The Depot) in Wellington, which presented bi-cultural works and saw the emergence of award-winning Māori theatre, particularly in the 1990s. McColl became co-artistic director of Taki Rua Theatre with playwright Hone Kouka. He directed the classic Nga Tangata Toa play written by Hone Kouka based on Ibsen's The Vikings. The play was re-set in a marae and presented at Taki Rua Theatre. He was artistic director of Downstage Theatre (1984–92), where New Zealand works were presented as well as classical theatre works. McColl has also directed productions at the New Zealand International Festival of the Arts including Ricordi! (1996) written by Peter Wells, based on stories by Katherine Mansfield. In 2003, he became the artistic director of Auckland Theatre Company, where his many productions include Cat on a Hot Tin Roof, Where We Once Belonged adapted from the novel by Sia Figiel, End of the Rainbow, Doubt, The Duchess of Malfi, Equus, Waiting for Godot, Uncle Vanya, Daughters of Heaven and Pohutukawa Tree by Bruce Mason. Award-winning actress Rena Owen, who played the lead role in the 2009 production of The Pohutukawa Tree spoke of McColl as the top director in New Zealand. McColl's other productions include Arthur Miller's The Crucible

== International ==
McColl has been a director for the Norwegian National Theatre, the Dutch National Theatre, as well as leading theatres in Australia and Europe. His production of Hedda Gabler at the Edinburgh Festival was received with great acclaim.

== Opera ==
He has directed opera including Quartet (2004) for the New Zealand International Festival of the Arts, La Boheme, The Italian Girl in Algiers, The Marriage of Figaro and The Prodigal Child.

== Honours and awards ==
McColl has been a director of numerous award-winning productions including multiple Best Director awards at the Chapman Tripp Theatre Awards. In the 2010 Queen's Birthday Honours, he was appointed an Officer of the New Zealand Order of Merit, for services to the theatre, film and television.
