= Roma Pōtiki =

New Zealand poet and artist (1958–2026)

- Born: 1958; Lower Hutt, New Zealand
- Died: 2026 (aged 68)
- Known for: poetry, theatre commentary, theatre, visual arts

Roma Pōtiki (1958–2026) was a New Zealand poet, playwright, visual artist, curator, theatre actor and director, as well as a commentator on Māori theatre. She was of Te Rarawa, Te Aupōuri and Ngāti Rangitihi descent. She published several poetry collections, with her poems included in notable anthologies, and her artwork is held in the permanent collection of the Dowse Art Museum.

== Background ==
Pōtiki was born in Lower Hutt, a city in the Wellington Region, and grew up in the suburb Wainuiomata. As a child she attended Wainuiomata Primary School, Woodhatton Primary School, Wainuiomata College and Wellington High School. Her first play was written while at primary school and she also started writing poetry at school.

== Career ==
Pōtiki was involved in contemporary Māori theatre in its early formative years. She was in a play performed by Te Ika A Maui Players in 1978 called Death of the Land by Rore Hapipi (Rowley Habib). She went on to help form the Māori theatre company Maranga Mai in 1979. This company was linked to the Māori protest movement and they toured a theatre production in 1979 - 1980 to marae and schools. The play Maranga Mai that they presented was a fifty minute story of Māori activism. It started in with the 1975 Māori Land March, included reference to occupations at the Raglan Golf Course, Bastion Point and the protests by Ngā Tamatoa during Waitangi Day. People involved included Brian Pōtiki, Anna Meihana, Hori Hapimana, Henare Hapimana, Buffy Pihema, Cyril Chapman, Jacki Davidson and Liz Marsden. The play included song, poetry, movement and drama.

In 1990, she was a founding director of another theatre company He Ara Hou. They performed and toured a play called Whatungarongaro. This play was directed by Pōtiki and John Anderson and devised over nine months with the company members. Pōtiki had previously done workshops with a theatre company PETA (Philippines Educational Theatre Association) and was influenced by their way of working.

Pōtiki's writing included poetry contribution to many anthologies, as well as published volumes. She wrote the foreword to books of New Zealand Māori plays and contributed text to exhibition catalogues. As an artist, Pōtiki exhibited art work and one of her pieces Hinewai is in the collection of the Dowse Art Museum.

== Legacy ==
The poem Stones in her Mouth by Pōtiki inspired contemporary New Zealand choreographer Lemi Ponifasio to create a community leadership project also called Stones in her Mouth in 2013. This involved a group of Māori women holding workshops at marae and writing text that was then performed.

=== He Ara Hou and Whatungarongaro ===
Before actor Rena Owen was in Once Were Warriors, she performed a similar role in theatre company He Ara Hou's play Whatungarongaro that Pōtiki co-created. Owen's performance in Whatungarongaro influenced her being cast in Once Were Warriors.

Playwright and director of theatre company Tawata Productions Hone Kouka cites seeing Whatungarongaro in 1991 at the Depot Theatre in Wellington as being life changing and convincing him that innovative Māori theatre had no boundaries. Another New Zealand theatre and film writer Briar Grace-Smith was an assistant to Pōtiki and learnt from the process of making Whatungarongaro.

== Published works ==
=== Poetry ===
- Stones in Her Mouth (1992) Publisher: Tamakimakaurau, N.Z. IWA
- Roma Pōtiki (1995) Publisher: Wai-te-ata Press, Wellington, N.Z.
- Shaking the Tree (1998) Publisher: Steele Roberts, Wellington, N.Z.
- Oriori: a Māori Child is Born: From Conception to Birth (1999) co-authored with Robyn Kahukiwa. Publisher: Wai-te-ata Press, Wellington, NZ

=== Plays ===
- Whatungarongaro (1990) Roma Pōtiki and He Ara Hou. Published in Ta Matou Mangai: Three Plays of the 1990s: Irirangi Bay, Taku Mangai, Whatungarongaro (1999) ed. Hone Kouka. Publisher: Victoria University Press, Wellington, N.Z.
- Going Home (1996)

=== Other ===
- Introduction - He Reo Hou: 5 Plays by Māori playwrights (1991) ed. Simon Garrett. Publisher: Playmarket, Wellington, N.Z.
- Robyn Kahukiwa : Works from 1985 - 1995 (1995) Exhibition catalogue. Includes essays by Anne Kirker and Jonathan Mané-Wheoki, and an interview by Roma Pōtiki. Publisher: Bowen Galleries, Wellington N.Z.
- Foreword - Waiora (1997) by Hone Kouka
- Memory Walking (1998) "Exhibition of contemporary paintings, prints and installation work by eight women artists from around the world." Text by Roma Pōtiki. Exhibiting artists: Lubaina Himid, Michi itami, Robyn Kahukiwa, Jean LaMarr, Lily Laita, Debra Priestly, Maud Sulter, Judy Watson. Publisher: City Gallery, Wellington N.Z.

=== Anthologies ===
Roma Pōtiki is widely published in anthologies.

Selected list:

- Te Ao Marama: Vol 4: Contemporary Maori Writing for Children (1994) ed. Witi Ihimaera
- Oxford (1997)
- My Heart Goes Swimming : New Zealand Love Poems (2000) ed. Jenny Bornholdt, Gregory O'Brien
- Wendt, Albert; Whaitiri, Reina; Sullivan, Robert, eds. (September 2010). Mauri Ola: Contemporary Polynesian Poems in English. Auckland: Auckland UP. ISBN 9781869404482.
