= Riwia Brown =

New Zealand playwright and screenwriter

Riwia Brown ONZM
- Born: 1957 (age 68–69); Wellington, New Zealand
- Occupations: Screenwriter; Playwright
- Relatives: Apirana Taylor (brother); Rangimoana Taylor (brother)

Riwia Brown ONZM (née Taylor; born 1957) is a New Zealand playwright. She is the screenwriter of the popular and award-winning New Zealand movie Once Were Warriors (1994). The Once Were Warriors screenplay, adapted from the book of the same name by Alan Duff, gained Brown the Best Screenplay award at the 1994 New Zealand Film and TV Awards. Brown has written for theatre, television and films.

== Early life and family ==
Brown is the daughter of Mel Taylor, a diplomat, and his wife, Reremoana Taylor and was born in 1957. She is of Māori descent and affiliates to the Ngāti Porou, Te Whānau-ā-Apanui and Taranaki iwi. Brown is from a creative family: her brother Apirana Taylor is a poet, story-teller and musician; her other siblings, Rangimoana Taylor and Haina Stewart, are also theatre practitioners.

Brown was educated at St Joseph's Māori Girls' College in Taradale.

== Career ==
Brown has written a number of plays since she began working in theatre during the 1980s. She was part of the Māori Theatre group Te Ohu Whakaari in Wellington at Taki Rua / The Depot Theatre alongside other writers including Rore Hapipi, Hone Tuwhare and her brother Apirana Taylor. Her first play was Roimata (1988) which debuted in Wellington and later adapted for television and published in He Reo Hou, a collection of Maori plays. Her play Nga Wahine (The Women) (1997) was adapted from the stage to television and featured Nancy Brunning in the lead role. In television, she wrote for the supernatural series Mataku and Taonga:Treasures of Our Past. She was a co-writer of the American film The Legend of Johnny Lingo (2003). Her play Irirangi Bay was televised as a feature-length episode in the six-part series Atamira. It aired on Māori TV on 20 May 2012, and starred Jamie McCaskill, Michelle Blundell.

In the 2001 New Year Honours, Brown was appointed an Officer of the New Zealand Order of Merit, for services to theatre and film.
