= Charles Diver =

New Zealand confectioner

- Born: Charles Richard Diver; 22 November 1910; Oamaru, New Zealand
- Died: 5 May 1994 (aged 83); Alexandra, New Zealand
- Occupation: Confectioner
- Known for: Invention of pineapple lumps
- Relatives: Cindy Diver (granddaughter)

Charles Richard Diver (22 November 1910 – 5 May 1994) worked at Regina Confectionery Factory in Oamaru as confectionery chef and floor production manager until 1972 upon which he retired. He was told to devise the use for the daily waste from the production run of marshmallow and invented what is now known as Pineapple lumps. He later went on to create other classic New Zealand sweets which are now part of kiwiana history. Diver's granddaughter Cindy Diver is a theatre director in Dunedin.

Charles Diver's original recipe.
