= Te Ohu Whakaari =

Māori theatre cooperative

Te Ohu Whakaari was a Māori theatre cooperative formed by Rangimoana Taylor in the early 1980s that created and performed plays across New Zealand.

== About ==
Rangimoana Taylor was inspired to form Te Ohu Whakaari by his experiences in an Auckland-based theatre company called Statement Theatre alongside Nathaniel Lees, and provoked into action through an opportunity from artist Darcy Nicholas who was running the Wellington Arts Centre that was funded at the time by the Department of Labour. The Depot Theatre (that became Taki Rua) nurtured a philosophy to foster New Zealand work which also influenced Te Ohu Whakaari.

Te Ohu Whakaari has lasting influence in New Zealand. Their theatrical practice combined western theatre traditions and Māori customs with story telling and movement in a unique style. Much of their work was cooperatively devised and has not been published.

Te Ohu Whakaari had a theatre-in-education programme which toured New Zealand. One of the Te Ohu Whakaari posters from 1986 is held in the collection of Te Papa Tongarewa and promotes a national tour (poster designed by Chris McBride). The poster says: "New Zealand Students Arts Council presents Te Ohu Whakaari, Young Maoris in Performance, National Tour 1986, Aotearoa – Te Waipounamu, With the Assistance of, Post Office Savings Bank QEII, Arts Council".

Members of Te Ohu Whakaari included Maringikura Campbell, Himiona Grace, Michael Grace, Apirana Taylor, Riwia Brown, Donna McLeod and Briar Grace-Smith.

Briar Grace-Smith joined To Ohu Whakaari when she was seventeen and says this about Te Ohu Whakaari: "We did explore a lot of issues that were affecting us as young people and we were able to see a result of that when we presented these stories to, in particular, a Māori audience because at that point they had never seen anything like it so their reactions were strong."

== Selected works ==
- Kohanga (1986) by Apirana Taylor. Kohanga is a play about the Kohanga Reo movement in the 1980s.
- Te Whanau a Tainui Jones (date unknown) by Apirana Taylor.
- Roimata (1988) by Riwia Brown.
- Te Hokina (date unknown) by Riwia Brown.
- Nga Wahine (date unknown) by Riwia Brown.
- Iwitaia (date unknown) by Haina Stewart.
