= Rob Mokaraka =

New Zealand playwright, producer, and actor

Rob Mokaraka is a New Zealand playwright and actor. He affiliates to Ngāpuhi and Ngāi Tūhoe.

He has been part of the performing group The Māori Sidesteps. In 2006 he played Taneatua in the Taki Rua production of Hone Kouka's Nga Tangata Toa at Downstage Theatre in Wellington. In 2012 he starred in the televised version of Briar Grace-Smith's play Purapurawhetu.

Strange Resting Places is a stage play co-written with Paolo Rotondo, produced by Taki Rua Productions and based on family stories of the Māori Battalion in Italy in World War II. Strange Resting Places was performed for over nine years and been published by Playmarket. It was also the opening feature-length episode of the six-part television series Atamira. It aired on Māori TV on 25 April 2012 at 8.30pm.

In July 2009 Mokaraka was struggling with his mental health and attempted "suicide-by-cop", an experience which he survived. He used this as the basis for a play, Shot Bro: Confessions of a Depressed Bullet, which he tours around community venues in Aotearoa New Zealand. Shot Bro was in the Tahi Festival in 2019. The documentary Shot Bro, aired on Māori TV on 7 June 2020, describes his attempts to heal from depression and to help others dealing with depression and loss.

== Awards ==
Mokaraka won the Best Newcomer Chapman Tripp acting award for his 2001 play Have Car, Will Travel.

Mokaraka and Rotondo jointly won the Peter Harcourt Award for Outstanding New Playwright of the Year at the Chapman Tripp Theatre Awards in 2007, for Strange Resting Places.
