= 2026 Ōtara-Papatoetoe Local Board by-election =

Local by-election in New Zealand

- 9 April 2026
- 4 of 7 seats of the Ōtara-Papatoetoe Local Board, representing the Papatoetoe subdivision
- Turnout: 8,339 (23.65%)
| Party | Seats | +/– |
|---|---|---|
| Papatoetoe Otara Action Team | 3 | +3 |
| Labour | 1 | −2 |
This lists parties that won seats. See the complete results below.
Affiliation of elected board members

The 2026 Ōtara-Papatoetoe Local Board by-election (also known as the Papatoetoe by-election) was a local by-election for the Ōtara-Papatoetoe Local Board in Auckland, New Zealand, held after the results of the 2025 election were voided by court order following allegations of suspected voter fraud.

Voting took place between 9 March and 9 April 2026, with voters electing the 4 board members representing the Papatoetoe subdivision. The winners will serve for the remainder of the 2025–2028 term.

Postal voting and the first past the post system were used. Only voters who were qualified to vote in the Papatoetoe subdivision in the 2025 election were eligible to vote.

== Schedule ==
Key dates related to the by-election are:

| 31 December 2025 | Candidate nominations opened |
| 28 January 2026 | Candidate nominations closed |
| 5 February 2026 | Election signs can be put up |
| 9 March 2026 | Start of voting period |
| 8 April 2026 | Election signs must be removed by midnight |
| 9 April 2026 | End of voting period |
| 9 April 2026 | Preliminary results announced |
| 10 April 2026 | Final results announced |

== Background ==
Elections for the board members for the 2025–2028 term of the Ōtara-Papatoetoe Local Board had originally been held as part of the 2025 local elections. Papatoetoe saw a more than 7 percent increase in voter turnout compared to the previous election, and was the only area of Auckland to see turnout significantly increase.

Following these elections, it was declared that all four seats for the Papatoetoe subdivision had been won by first-time candidates from the new Papatoetoe Ōtara Action Team ticket, with none of the previous board members having won re-election. However, these results were voided at a hearing at the Manukau District Court on 16 December 2025, following a petition alleging voting irregularities from former board member Vi Hausia. As such, a by-election to fill the vacated seats was due to be held with voting opening on 9 March 2026.

The members of the Papatoetoe Ōtara Action Team ticket petitioned the High Court for an urgent judicial review of the District Court's decision. High Court Justice Jane Anderson reserved her decision in February. In March, Justice Anderson released her decision upholding the ruling of the District Court, meaning that the by-election would still go ahead.

Until the results of this election were confirmed, the Ōtara-Papatoetoe local board, having only the three confirmed members from the Ōtara subdivision out of a total of seven, could not meet quorum.

== Campaign ==
Three tickets ran candidates for all four vacancies in the election: Labour, Papatoetoe Ōtara Action Team, and Independently Papatoetoe.

During the campaign, racially motivated allegations of electoral fraud were targeted at the Indian and South Asian communities in Papatoetoe. Candidates from both the Papatoetoe Ōtara Action Team and Labour condemned such rhetoric as misinformation.

Labour said it was campaigning on "protecting democracy", including under banners reading "Protect our Democracy". The Papatoetoe Ōtara Action Team alleged that Labour was using the district court decision during the campaign to imply that the Action Team had been involved in fraud in the October election without explaining the High Court judgement that the Action Team had not been impugned by the case. Labour candidate Vi Hausia in turn accused the Action Team of using ethnicity issues to distract from the actual grounds for his petition to the district court.

In March, a community-led "meet the candidates" forum, organised by local business Bluespur Consulting, was held at Papatoetoe Town Hall and was attended by 15 of the 20 candidates.

== Candidates ==
Twenty candidates contested the by-election, with 12 candidates from the 2025 election re-contesting the seats along with eight new candidates. All four of the Papatoetoe Ōtara Action Team candidates whose results in the previous election were voided ran again.

| Candidates | Affiliation | Notes |
|---|---|---|
| Kunal Bhalla | Papatoetoe Otara Action Team | Candidate in the 2025 election |
| Ashraf Choudhary | Labour | Former MP and board member. Candidate in the 2025 election |
| Harold Hirdeshwar Deo | None | |
| Avinash Kaur Dhaliwal | Labour | Candidate in the 2025 election |
| Peter Dons | Independently Papatoetoe | Candidate in the 2025 election |
| Vi Hausia | Labour | Former board member. Candidate in the 2025 election |
| Tuafuti Ka | Independent | Candidate in the 2025 election |
| Namrata Nandika Kumar | None | |
| Chris Latham | Communities and Residents | Candidate in the 2025 election |
| Albert Lim | Independently Papatoetoe | Former board member. Candidate in the 2025 election |
| John Loau | None | Candidate for the Upper Harbour Local Board in 2025 |
| Karl Mokaraka | Independent | Candidate in the 2023 general election for the Vision NZ party |
| Kushma Nair | Papatoetoe Otara Action Team | Candidate in the 2025 election |
| Swanie Nelson | Independent | Former board member. Candidate in the 2025 election in the Ōtara subdivision. |
| Taitosaua Bill Peace | Independent | |
| Sandeep Saini | Papatoetoe Otara Action Team | Candidate in the 2025 election |
| Jeet Singh | Papatoetoe Otara Action Team | Candidate in the 2025 election |
| Raj Singh | Labour | Candidate in the 2025 election |
| Alison Weakley | Independently Papatoetoe | |
| Chris Webb | Independently Papatoetoe | |

== Results ==
Final results were released on 10 April, with a turnout of 24.1%. Vi Hausia, the Labour candidate who had brought the petition which resulted in the previous election being voided, was elected having received the most votes. Three of the four Papatoetoe Ōtara Action Team candidates, Jeet Singh, Sandeep Saini and Kushma Nair, were re-elected. Previously successful Papatoetoe Ōtara Action Team candidate Kunal Bhalla was not returned to the board, coming in sixth place.

2026 Ōtara-Papatoetoe Local Board by-election – Papatoetoe subdivision
| Affiliation | Candidate | Vote | % | +/− (2022) | +/− (2025) |
|---|---|---|---|---|---|
| Labour | Vi Hausia^{†} | 2,858 | 34.27 | −5.11 | +5.10 |
| Papatoetoe Otara Action Team | Jeet Singh | 2,503 | 30.02 | (new) | −15.74 |
| Papatoetoe Otara Action Team | Sandeep Saini | 2,499 | 29.97 | (new) | −15.58 |
| Papatoetoe Otara Action Team | Kushma Nair | 2,399 | 28.77 | (new) | −13.22 |
| Communities and Residents | Chris Latham | 2,380 | 28.54 | (new) | +3.71 |
| Papatoetoe Otara Action Team | Kunal Bhalla | 2,358 | 28.28 | (new) | −12.00 |
| Independently Papatoetoe | Chris Webb | 1,920 | 23.02 | (new) | (new) |
| Independently Papatoetoe | Albert Lim^{†} | 1,883 | 22.58 | −17.12 | +1.32 |
| Labour | Ashraf Choudhary^{†} | 1,811 | 21.72 | −17.18 | −2.30 |
| Labour | Avinash Dhaliwal | 1,668 | 20.00 | (new) | −2.19 |
| Labour | Raj Singh | 1,640 | 19.67 | (new) | +0.6 |
| Independently Papatoetoe | Alison Weakley | 1,289 | 15.46 | (new) | (new) |
| Independently Papatoetoe | Peter Dons | 1,031 | 12.36 | −14.32 | −3.72 |
| Independent | Swanie Nelson | 1,020 | 12.23 | (new) | (new) |
| Independent | Taitosaua Peace | 752 | 9.02 | (new) | (new) |
| Independent | Karl Mokaraka | 586 | 7.03 | (new) | (new) |
| Independent | Tuafuti Ka | 552 | 6.62 | (new) | −6.33 |
| Independent | John Loau | 527 | 6.32 | (new) | (new) |
| Independent | Namrata Kumar | 416 | 4.99 | (new) | (new) |
| Independent | Harold Deo | 408 | 4.89 | −10.90 | (new) |
| Informal | | 58 | 0.70 | +6.98 | +0.43 |
| Blank | | 8 | 0.10 | −7.99 | −0.66 |
| Turnout | | 8,339 | (23.65) | (−0.49) | (−7.99) |
| Registered | | 35,253 | | | |
| Labour hold | | | | | |
| Papatoetoe Otara Action Team gain from Independently Papatoetoe | | | | | |
| Papatoetoe Otara Action Team gain from Labour | | | | | |
| Papatoetoe Otara Action Team gain from Labour | | | | | |
^{†} incumbent prior to 2025 election

== Aftermath ==
=== Chair election ===
Chair election
- 21 April 2026
Chair before election
Kushma Nair
Papatoetoe Otara Action Team
Elected Chair
Apulu Reece Autagavaia
Labour

Prior to the results of the 2025 election in the Papatoetoe subdivision being voided on 16 December 2025, Papatoetoe Otara Action Team board member Kushma Nair had been elected as board chair at the board's inaugural meeting on 4 November 2025, with Paramjeet Singh elected as deputy chair.

On 21 April 2026, at the board's first full meeting following the by-election, the board voted 4–3 to implement a rotating leadership model wherein former chair and Ōtara board member Apulu Reece Autagavaia would serve as the chair for the first half of the term while Papatoetoe board member Vi Hausia would take over for the second half. The pair will also rotate positions as deputy chairperson. Papatoetoe board member Kushma Nair had been nominated for both the chair and deputy chair positions, but was unsuccessful.

=== Anti-Indian vandalism incident ===
On the evening of 11 April, the entrance to Papatoetoe Central School was vandalised with racist graffiti targeting Indians. Police subsequently launched a hate crime investigation into the school entrance vandalism. The incident occurred a day after three members of the Papatoetoe Otara Action Team were re-elected to the Ōtara-Papatoetoe Local Board following the 2026 by-election. A second anti-Indian graffiti incident was reported in Royal Oak on 16 April. Police also confirmed they were investigating the second incident as a hate crime.

On 18 April, Police arrested and charged a man with offensive behaviour and wilful damage in relation to the school entrance vandalism incident. The Papatoetoe school vandalism was also condemned by several local leaders including Manurewa-Papakura ward councillor Daniel Newman, ACT MP Parmjeet Parmar and Labour Party MP Jenny Salesa.
