= 2025 Auckland local board elections =

Local elections in New Zealand

- 11 October 2025
- 21 of 21 local boards
Party	Boards	+/–
No majority	6	+1
Labour	3	−2
C&R	3	−1
Manurewa-Papakura Action Team	2	0
City Vision	2	+2
Team Franklin	1	0
Shore Action	1	0
Living Upper Harbour	1	0
Future West	1	0
This lists parties that won seats. See the complete results below.
- 151 local board members
Party	Seats	+/–
Independent	32	+8
C&R	24	−3
Labour	23	−2
Manurewa-Papakura Action Team	13	+2
City Vision	12	+3
Team Franklin	8	0
Shore Action	7	−1
Future West	5	+1
Backing the Bays	4	+1
Living Upper Harbour	4	+1
#weknowhowick	2	−2
A Fresh Approach	2	−2
Coast Community	2	+1
Coast People	2	−1
Healthy and Happy	2	+2
WestWards	2	0
#LoveManurewa	1	−2
ACT Local	1	+1
Practical Not Political	1	−1
vacant (Note: See 2026 Ōtara-Papatoetoe Local Board by-election for further info.)	4	+4
This lists parties that won seats. See the complete results below.

The 2025 Auckland local board elections (Māori: Nga Pōtitanga te Poari ā-Rohe o Tāmaki Makaurau 2025) were triennial elections held from 9 September until 11 October 2025 to elect the 151 members of Auckland Council's 21 local boards as part of that year's local elections in Auckland and nation-wide.

== Summary ==
=== Affiliation of board members by local board ===
Local board	Seats	Board members				Details	Refs
Local board	Seats	2022		Elected		Details	Refs
Albert-Eden	8	Communities and Residents	4	City Vision	5	Details	
Albert-Eden	8	City Vision	4	Communities and Residents	3	Details	
Aotea / Great Barrier	5	Independent	5	Independent	5	Details	
Devonport-Takapuna	6	A Fresh Approach	4	A Fresh Approach	2	Details	
Devonport-Takapuna	6	Communities and Residents	2	Communities and Residents	2	Details	
Devonport-Takapuna	6			Independent	2	Details	
Franklin	9	Team Franklin	8	Team Franklin	8	Details	
Franklin	9	Independent	1	Independent	1	Details	
Henderson-Massey	8	Labour	5	Labour	6	Details	
Henderson-Massey	8	Independent	3	WestWards	1	Details	
Henderson-Massey	8			Independent	1	Details	
Hibiscus and Bays	8	Coast People	3	Backing the Bays	4	Details	
Hibiscus and Bays	8	Backing the Bays	3	Coast Community	2	Details	
Hibiscus and Bays	8	Independent Locals	1	Coast People	2	Details	
Hibiscus and Bays	8	Team Coast	1			Details	
Howick	11	#weknow	4	Independent	3	Details	
Howick	11	Practical not Political	2	Communities and Residents	3	Details	
Howick	11	Communities and Residents	2	#weknowhowick	2	Details	
Howick	11	Independent	1	Healthy and Happy	2	Details	
Howick	11			Practical Not Political	1	Details	
Kaipātiki	8	Shore Action	8	Shore Action	7	Details	
Kaipātiki	8			Independent	1	Details	
Māngere-Ōtāhuhu	7	Labour	7	Labour	7	Details	
Manurewa	8	Manurewa Action Team	5	Manurewa Action Team	7	Details	
Manurewa	8	#LoveManurewa	3	#LoveManurewa	1	Details	
Maungakiekie-Tāmaki	7	Labour	4	Communities and Residents	4	Details	
Maungakiekie-Tāmaki	7	Communities and Residents	3	Labour	3	Details	
Ōrākei	7	Communities and Residents	7	Communities and Residents	6	Details	
Ōrākei	7			ACT Local	1	Details	
Ōtara-Papatoetoe	7	Labour	5	vacant	4	Details	
Ōtara-Papatoetoe	7	Independently Papatoetoe	1	Labour	3	Details	
Ōtara-Papatoetoe	7	Independent	1			Details	
Papakura	6	Papakura Action Team	6	Papakura Action Team	6	Details	
Puketāpapa	6	Communities and Residents	4	Communities and Residents	4	Details	
Puketāpapa	6	Roskill Community Voice	2	City Vision	2	Details	
Rodney	9	Rodney First	5	Independent	9	Details	
Rodney	9	Independent	3			Details	
Upper Harbour	6	Living Upper Harbour	3	Living Upper Harbour	4	Details	
Upper Harbour	6	Independent	3	Independent	2	Details	
Waiheke	5	Independent	5	Independent	5	Details	
Waitākere Ranges	6	Future West	4	Future West	5	Details	
Waitākere Ranges	6	WestWards	2	WestWards	1	Details	
Waitematā	7	Communities and Residents	4	City Vision	5	Details	
Waitematā	7	City Vision	3	Communities and Residents	2	Details	
Whau	7	Labour	5	Labour	4	Details	
Whau	7	Independent	2	Independent	3	Details	
All 21 local boards	151						

== Albert-Eden ==
2025 Albert-Eden Local Board election
- 11 October 2025
- Registered: 74,052
- Turnout: 22,224 (30.01%)
- 8 seats on the Albert-Eden Local Board; 5 seats needed for a majority
Party	Seats	+/–
City Vision	5	+1
C&R	3	−1
This lists parties that won seats. See the complete results below.

Chair election
- 3 November 2025
Candidate	Margi Watson
Party	City Vision
Electoral vote	Unopposed
Chair before election
Kendyl Smith
C&R
Elected Chair
Margi Watson
City Vision

=== Summary ===
==== Composition summary ====
Subdivision	Previous		Elected	
Maungawhau	Communities and Residents	Kendyl Smith	Communities and Residents	Kendyl Smith
Maungawhau	Communities and Residents	Jack Tan	Communities and Residents	Jack Tan
Maungawhau	Communities and Residents	José Fowler	Communities and Residents	José Fowler
Maungawhau	Communities and Residents	Rex Smith	City Vision	Michelle Thorp
Owairaka	City Vision	Margi Watson	City Vision	Margi Watson
Owairaka	City Vision	Christina Robertson	City Vision	Christina Robertson
Owairaka	City Vision	Julia Maskill^{R}	City Vision	Emma McInnes
Owairaka	City Vision	Liv Roe^{R}	City Vision	Jacqui Tay
^{R} retired

=== Maungawhau subdivision ===
Maungawhau subdivision
Affiliation	Candidate	Vote	%	+/−
Communities and Residents	Kendyl Smith^{†}	5,738	51.79	
Communities and Residents	Jack Tan^{†}	4,856	43.83	
Communities and Residents	José Fowler^{†}	4,387	39.59	
City Vision	Michelle Thorp	4,376	39.49	
Communities and Residents	Rex Smith^{†}	4,186	37.78	
City Vision	Mark Graham	4,181	37.73	
City Vision	Jonty Carroll	3,412	30.79	
City Vision	William Chalmers	3,133	28.28	
Independent	Paul Sun	2,492	22.49	
Independent	John McCallum	991	8.94	
Informal		28	0.25	
Blank		425	3.84	
Turnout		11,080	(28.97)	
Registered		38,249		
Communities and Residents hold				
Communities and Residents hold				
Communities and Residents hold				
City Vision gain Communities and Residents				
^{†} incumbent

=== Ōwairaka subdivision ===
Ōwairaka subdivision
Affiliation	Candidate	Vote	%	+/−
City Vision	Margi Watson^{†}	6,548	58.76	
City Vision	Emma McInnes	5,973	53.60	
City Vision	Christina Robertson^{†}	5,852	52.51	
City Vision	Jacqui Tay	5,744	51.54	
Communities and Residents	Ross Bannan	4,137	37.12	
Communities and Residents	Redwan Islam	2,907	26.09	
Independent	Matt Zwartz	2,152	19.31	
Independent	John Leach	1,171	10.51	
Informal		25	0.22	
Blank		308	2.76	
Turnout		11,144	(31.13)	
Registered		35,803		
City Vision hold				
City Vision hold				
City Vision hold				
City Vision hold				
^{†} incumbent

=== Chair election ===
Margi Watson (City Vision) was elected as the new board chair unopposed.

== Aotea / Great Barrier ==
2025 Aotea / Great Barrier Local Board election
- 11 October 2025
- Registered: 968
- Turnout: 544 (56.20%)
- 5 seats on the Aotea / Great Barrier Local Board; 3 seats needed for a majority
Party	Seats	+/–
Independent	5	0
This lists parties that won seats. See the complete results below.

Chair election
- 30 October 2025
Candidate	Izzy Fordham
Party	Independent
Electoral vote	Unopposed
Chair before election
Izzy Fordham
Independent
Elected Chair
Izzy Fordham
Independent

=== Summary ===
==== Composition summary ====
Previous		Elected	
Independent	Izzy Fordham	Independent	Izzy Fordham
Independent	Chris Olliver	Independent	Chris Olliver
Independent	Neil Sanderson	Independent	Neil Sanderson
Independent	Patrick O'Shea^{R}	Independent	Ryan Daly
Independent	Laura Caine^{R}	Independent	Nikki Watts
^{R} retired

=== Aotea / Great Barrier at-large ===
At-large
Affiliation	Candidate	Vote	%	+/−
Independent	Izzy Fordham^{†}	406	74.63	
Independent	Ryan Daly	367	67.46	
Independent	Nikki Watts	360	66.18	
Independent	Chris Olliver^{†}	294	54.04	
Independent	Neil Sanderson^{†}	271	49.82	
Independent	Gregory Heap	230	42.28	
Independent	Ben Assado	203	37.32	
Independent	Fenella Christian	199	36.58	
Informal		0	0.00	
Blank		2	0.37	
Turnout		544	(56.20)	
Registered		968		
Independent hold				
Independent gain from Independent				
Independent gain from Independent				
Independent hold				
Independent hold				
^{†} incumbent

=== Chair election ===
Incumbent chair Izzy Fordham (Independent) was re-elected as the board chair unopposed.

== Devonport-Takapuna ==
2025 Devonport-Takapuna Local Board election
- 11 October 2025
- 6 seats on the Devonport-Takapuna Local Board; 4 seats needed for a majority
Party	Seats	+/–
C&R	2	0
Independent	2	+2
A Fresh Approach	2	−2
This lists parties that won seats. See the complete results below.

Chair election
- 4 November 2025
Candidate	Trish Deans
Party	Independent
Electoral vote	Unopposed
Chair before election
Toni van Tonder
A Fresh Approach
Elected Chair
Trish Deans
Independent

=== Summary ===
==== Composition summary ====
Previous		Elected	
Communities and Residents	George Wood	Communities and Residents	George Wood
Communities and Residents	Gavin Busch	Communities and Residents	Gavin Busch
A Fresh Approach	Terence Harpur	A Fresh Approach	Terence Harpur
A Fresh Approach	Toni van Tonder^{R}	A Fresh Approach	Scott MacArthur
A Fresh Approach	Melissa Powell^{R}	Independent	Trish Deans
A Fresh Approach	Peter Allen^{R}	Independent	Garth Ellingham
^{R} retired

=== Devonport-Takapuna at-large ===
At-large
Affiliation	Candidate	Vote	%	+/−
Communities and Residents	George Wood^{†}	5,662	36.64	
Communities and Residents	Gavin Busch^{†}	5,413	35.03	
Independent	Trish Deans	5,272	34.11	
Independent	Garth Ellingham	5,151	33.33	
A Fresh Approach	Terence Harpur^{†}	5,068	32.79	
A Fresh Approach	Scott MacArthur	4,901	31.71	
Communities and Residents	Michael Single	4,259	27.56	
Communities and Residents	Neil Zent	4,108	26.58	
ACT Local	Helena Roza	3,786	24.50	
Independent	Pete Cronshaw	3,759	24.32	
A Fresh Approach	Karleen Reeve	3,336	21.59	
A Fresh Approach	Kimberley Graham	3,238	20.95	
Independent	Paul Cornish	3,230	20.90	
A Fresh Approach	Karin Horen	3,144	20.34	
Communities and Residents	Kaumosi Opie	3,121	20.20	
A Fresh Approach	Lewis Rowe	3,102	20.07	
Communities and Residents	Kamini Schoonbee	2,877	18.62	
Independent	Mary-Anne Benson-Cooper	2,655	17.18	
Independent	Kent Tregonning	1,855	12.00	
Independent	James Rohloff	1,815	11.74	
Informal		82	0.53	
Blank		425	2.75	
Turnout		15,454	(34.87)	
Registered		44,318		
Communities and Residents hold				
Communities and Residents hold				
Independent gain from A Fresh Approach				
Independent gain from A Fresh Approach				
A Fresh Approach hold				
A Fresh Approach hold				
^{†} incumbent

=== Chair election ===
Trish Dean (Independent) was elected as the new board chair unopposed.

== Franklin ==
2025 Franklin Local Board election
- 11 October 2025
- 9 seats on the Franklin Local Board; 5 seats needed for a majority
Party	Seats	+/–
Team Franklin	8	0
Independent	1	0
This lists parties that won seats. See the complete results below.

Chair election
- 4 November 2025
Candidate	Alan Cole
Party	Team Franklin
Electoral vote	Unopposed
Chair before election
Angela Fulljames
Team Franklin
Elected Chair
Alan Cole
Team Franklin

=== Summary ===
==== Composition summary ====
Subdivision	Previous		Elected	
Pukekohe	Team Franklin	Alan Cole	Team Franklin	Alan Cole
Pukekohe	Team Franklin	Andrew Kay	Team Franklin	Andrew Kay
Pukekohe	Team Franklin	Amanda Kinzett^{R}	Team Franklin	Merritt Watson
Pukekohe	Team Franklin	Logan Soole^{R}	Team Franklin	Lesieli Oliver
Wairoa	Team Franklin	Amanda Hopkins	Team Franklin	Amanda Hopkins
Wairoa	Team Franklin	Malcolm Bell	Team Franklin	Malcolm Bell
Wairoa	Team Franklin	Angela Fulljames^{R}	Team Franklin	Alix Bonnington
Waiuku	Independent	Garry Holmes	Independent	Garry Holmes
Waiuku	Team Franklin	Sharlene Druyven^{R}	Team Franklin	Hunter Hawker
^{R} retired

=== Pukekohe subdivision ===
Pukekohe subdivision
Affiliation	Candidate	Vote	%	+/−
Team Franklin	Alan Cole^{†}	6,238		
Team Franklin	Andrew Kay^{†}	5,116		
Team Franklin	Merritt Watson	5,104		
Team Franklin	Lesieli Oliver	3,923		
Independent	Andrew Leask	3,377		
Independent	Bas Watson	1,952		
Informal		12		
Blank		171		
Turnout		8,451		
Registered		28,225		
Tean Franklin hold				
Tean Franklin hold				
Tean Franklin hold				
Tean Franklin hold				
^{†} incumbent

=== Wairoa subdivision ===
Wairoa subdivision
Affiliation	Candidate	Vote	%	+/−
Team Franklin	Amanda Hopkins^{†}	3,923		
Team Franklin	Malcolm Bell^{†}	3,787		
Team Franklin	Alix Bonnington	2,993		
ACT Local	Dene Green	2,418		
Independent	Darron Gedge	1,619		
Independent	Nick Corlett	1,132		
Independent	Blake O'Reilly	870		
Informal		12		
Blank		172		
Turnout		6,851		
Registered		19,929		
Team Franklin hold				
Team Franklin hold				
Team Franklin hold				
^{†} incumbent

=== Waiuku subdivision ===
Waiuku subdivision
Affiliation	Candidate	Vote	%	+/−
Independent	Garry Holmes^{†}	2,588		
Team Franklin	Hunter Hawker	1,169		
Independent	Tremayne Thompson	888		
Independent	Thomas Vanderlaan	756		
Independent	Ngaire Raumate	599		
Independent	Les Thomas	580		
Rock the Vote NZ	Daymond Goulder-Horobin	251		
Informal		4		
Blank		44		
Turnout		3,920		
Registered		11,421		
Independent hold				
Team Franklin hold				
^{†} incumbent

=== Chair election ===
Alan Cole (Team Franklin) was elected as the new board chair unopposed.

== Henderson-Massey ==
2025 Henderson-Massey Local Board election
- 11 October 2025
- 9 seats on the Henderson-Massey Local Board; 5 seats needed for a majority
Party	Seats	+/–
Labour	6	+1
WestWards	1	+1
Independent	1	−2
This lists parties that won seats. See the complete results below.

Chair election
- 4 November 2025
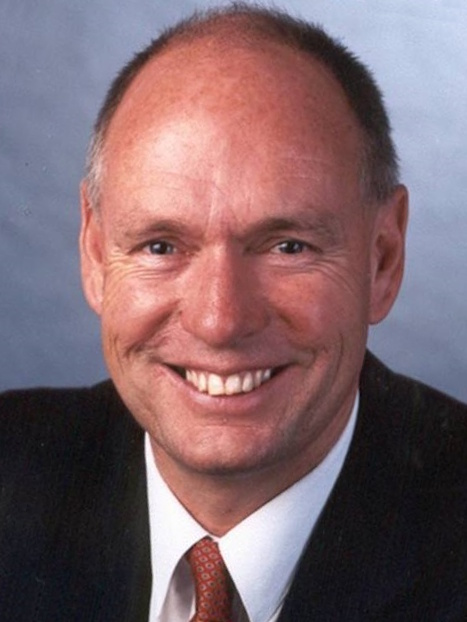
Candidate	Chris Carter
Party	Labour
Electoral vote	Unopposed
Chair before election
Chris Carter
Labour
Elected Chair
Chris Carter
Labour

=== Summary ===
==== Composition summary ====
Previous		Elected	
Labour	Chris Carter	Labour	Chris Carter
Labour	Will Flavell	Labour	Will Flavell
Labour	Oscar Kightley	Labour	Oscar Kightley
Labour	Brooke Loader	Labour	Brooke Loader
Labour	Dan Collins	Labour	Dan Collins
Independent	Brenda Brady	Labour	Susan Diao
Independent	Peter Chan	WestWards	Luke Wilson
Independent	Ingrid Papau	Independent	Ingrid Papau

=== Henderson-Massey at-large ===
At-large
Affiliation	Candidate	Vote	%	+/−
Labour	Chris Carter^{†}	9,928		
Labour	Will Flavell^{†}	9,555		
Labour	Oscar Kightley^{†}	8,978		
Labour	Brooke Loader^{†}	8,781		
Labour	Susan Diao	8,245		
Labour	Dan Collins^{†}	7,180		
WestWards	Luke Wilson	7,004		
Independent	Ingrid Papau^{†}	6,514		
Independent	Linda Cooper	6,484		
WestWards	Amanda Roberts	5,947		
Independent	Peter Chan^{†}	5,649		
Labour	Vincent Naidu	5,514		
WestWards	Sunil Kaushal	5,402		
Green	Zooey Newman	4,809		
Independent	Joseph Erceg	4,496		
WestWards	Grahame Hill	4,312		
Independent	Pepeka George-Koteka	4,116		
WestWards	Andy Liu	4,054		
WestWards	Leao Tildsley	3,674		
ACT Local	Ben Cox	3,656		
WestWards	Jason Pope	3,591		
WestWards	Jacob Curran	3,423		
Independent	Michael Coote	3,236		
Independent	Wayne Barlow	2,465		
Independent	Matthew Upson	2,184		
Independent	Denise Widdison	1,867		
Independent	Roy Kaunds	1,782		
Independent	Glenn Patel	1,367		
Independent	Deon Wallace	858		
Informal		153		
Blank		334		
Turnout		21,965		
Registered		86,419		
Labour hold				
Labour hold				
Labour hold				
Labour gain from Independent				
Labour hold				
WestWards gain from Independent				
Independent hold				
^{†} incumbent

=== Chair election ===
Incumbent chair Chris Carter (Labour) was re-elected unopposed by board members.

== Hibiscus and Bays ==
2025 Hibiscus and Bays Local Board election
- 11 October 2025
- 8 seats on the Hibiscus and Bays Local Board; 5 seats needed for a majority
Party	Seats	+/–
Backing the Bays	4	+1
Coast Community	2	+1
Coast People	2	−1
This lists parties that won seats. See the complete results below.

Chair election
- 28 October 2025
Candidate	Alexis Poppelbaum
Party	Backing the Bays
Electoral vote	Unopposed
Chair before election
Alexis Poppelbaum
Backing the Bays
Elected Chair
Alexis Poppelbaum
Backing the Bays

=== Summary ===
==== Composition summary ====
Subdivision	Previous		Elected	
East Coast Bays	Backing the Bays	Alexis Poppelbaum	Backing the Bays	Alexis Poppelbaum
East Coast Bays	Backing the Bays	Julia Parfitt	Backing the Bays	Julia Parfitt
East Coast Bays	Backing the Bays	Gregg Walden	Backing the Bays	Gregg Walden
East Coast Bays	Independent Locals	Victoria Short^{R}	Backing the Bays	Mike Bishop
Hibiscus Coast	Team Coast	Alexis Poppelbaum	Coast Community	Alexis Poppelbaum
Hibiscus Coast	Coast People	Sam Mills	Coast Community	Gemma Moffat
Hibiscus Coast	Coast People	Gary Brown	Coast People	Gary Brown
Hibiscus Coast	Coast People	Leanne Willis	Coast People	Leanne Willis
^{R} retired

=== East Coast Bays subdivision ===
East Coast Bays subdivision
Affiliation	Candidate	Vote	%	+/−
Backing the Bays	Alexis Poppelbaum^{†}	8,819		
Backing the Bays	Julia Parfitt^{†}	7,786		
Backing the Bays	Mike Bishop	7,382		
Backing the Bays	Gregg Walden^{†}	6,605		
Independent	Marewa Glover	2,848		
Independent	Toby Malcolm	2,429		
Independent	Leon Jarden	2,398		
Informal		17		
Blank		314		
Turnout		11,680		
Registered		37,679		
Backing the Bays hold				
Backing the Bays hold				
Backing the Bays gain from Independent Locals				
Backing the Bays hold				
^{†} incumbent

=== Hibiscus Coast subdivision ===
Hibiscus Coast subdivision
Affiliation	Candidate	Vote	%	+/−
Coast Community	Jake Law^{†}	7,988		
Coast Community	Gemma Moffat	7,284		
Coast People	Gary Brown^{†}	6,343		
Coast People	Leanne Willis^{†}	5,016		
Coast Community	Nick Rado	4,639		
ACT Local	Sam Mills^{†}	4,394		
Hibiscus People First	Dani Dawson	4,201		
Hibiscus People First	Jayden Haley	3,231		
Coast People	Gary George	2,871		
Independent	Michael Wilson	2,464		
Hibiscus People First	Jeffrey Olufson	2,372		
ACT Local	Yang Qu	2,287		
Coast People	Darag Rennie	2,091		
Independent	Christopher Lake	1,641		
Independent	Joshua Burt	1,389		
Independent	Andy Mackie	1,297		
Independent	Pamela Tipa	796		
Informal		81		
Blank		300		
Turnout		17,194		
Registered		47,559		
Coast Community hold				
Coast Community gain from Coast People				
Coast People hold				
Coast People hold				
^{†} incumbent

=== Chair election ===
Incumbent chair Alexis Poppelbaum (Backing the Bays) was re-elected as the board chair unopposed.

== Howick ==
2025 Howick Local Board election
- 11 October 2025
- 11 seats on the Howick Local Board; 6 seats needed for a majority
Party	Seats	+/–
Independent	3	+2
C&R	3	+1
Healthy and Happy	2	+2
#weknowhowick	2	−2
Practical Not Political	1	−1
This lists parties that won seats. See the complete results below.

Chair election
- 30 October 2025
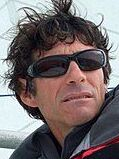
Candidate	Bruce Kendall
Party	C&R
Electoral vote	Unopposed
Chair before election
Damian Light
Independent
Elected Chair
Bruce Kendall
C&R

=== Summary ===
==== Composition summary ====
Subdivision	Previous		Elected	
Botany	Independent	Damian Light	Independent	Damian Light
Botany	Practical Not Political	Mike Turinsky	Practical Not Political	Mike Turinsky
Botany	#weknowhowick	Peter Young	seat abolished	
Flat Bush	new subdivision		Healthy and Happy	Peter Young
Flat Bush	new subdivision		Healthy and Happy	Kai Zeng
Flat Bush	new subdivision		Independent	Krish Naidu
Howick	#weknowhowick	John Spiller	#weknowhowick	John Spiller
Howick	#weknowhowick	Adele White	#weknowhowick	Adele White
Howick	#weknowhowick	Bo Burns	Communities and Residents	Luke Collings
Pakuranga	Practical Not Political	Bruce Kendall	Communities and Residents	Bruce Kendall
Pakuranga	Communities and Residents	David Collings	Communities and Residents	Jack Collins
Pakuranga	Communities and Residents	Katrina Bungard	Independent	Katrina Bungard

=== Botany subdivision ===
Botany subdivision
Affiliation	Candidate	Vote	%	+/−
Independent	Damian Light^{†}	3,865		
Practical Not Political	Mike Turinsky^{†}	3,760		
ACT Local	Ali Dache	1,630		
Independent	Melesina Umeano	556		
Independent	Leon Jarden	2,398		
Informal		9		
Blank		25		
Turnout		5,951		
Registered		21,931		
Independent hold				
Practical Not Political hold				
^{†} incumbent

=== Flat bush subdivision ===
Flat bush subdivision
Affiliation	Candidate	Vote	%	+/−
Healthy and Happy	Peter Young	2,499		
Healthy and Happy	Kai Zeng	2,491		
Independent	Krish Naidu	2,462		
Communities and Residents	David Collings	1,649		
Independent	Jami-Lee Ross	1,649		
Independent	Tracy Wignall	1,493		
Independent	Sonia Singh	1,134		
Independent	Gurbani Singh	1,062		
Communities and Residents	Prashant Belwalkar	654		
Independent	Joseph Rebello	400		
Informal		24		
Blank		113		
Turnout		6,390		
Registered		27,647		
Healthy and Happy win (new subdivision)				
Healthy and Happy win (new subdivision)				
Independent win (new subdivision)				

=== Howick subdivision ===
Howick subdivision
Affiliation	Candidate	Vote	%	+/−
#weknowhowick	Bo Burns^{†} (withdrawn)	7,046		
#weknowhowick	John Spiller^{†}	5,657		
#weknowhowick	Adele White^{†}	5,647		
Communities and Residents	Luke Collings	2,921		
ACT Local	William Goldberg	2,563		
Communities and Residents	Billy Davis	1,788		
Independent	Matthew Sheehy	1,771		
Informal		15		
Blank		274		
Turnout		10,770		
Registered		32,440		
#weknowhowick hold				
#weknowhowick hold				
Communities and Residents gain from #weknowhowick				
^{†} incumbent

=== Pakuranga subdivision ===
Pakuranga subdivision
Affiliation	Candidate	Vote	%	+/−
Communities and Residents	Bruce Kendall^{†}	5,127		
Independent	Katrina Bungard^{†}	4,865		
Communities and Residents	Jack Collins	3,723		
Communities and Residents	Sarah Kavanagh	2,745		
Independent	Wayne Huang	2,613		
Independent	Frank Wong	1,957		
ACT Local	Pat Arroyo	1,876		
Independent	Blake O'Reilly	839		
Informal		6		
Blank		162		
Turnout		9,372		
Registered		30,586		
Communities and Residents gain from Practical Not Political (Note: Incumbent changed affiliation)				
Independent gain from Communities and Residents				
Communities and Residents hold				
^{†} incumbent

=== Chair election ===
Bruce Kendall (Communities and Residents) was elected as the new board chair unopposed.

== Kaipātiki ==
2025 Kaipātiki Local Board election
- 11 October 2025
- 8 seats on the Kaipātiki Local Board; 5 seats needed for a majority
Party	Seats	+/–
Shore Action	7	−1
Independent	1	+1
This lists parties that won seats. See the complete results below.

Chair election
- 29 October 2025
Candidate	Danielle Grant
Party	Shore Action
Electoral vote	Unopposed
Chair before election
John Gillon
Shore Action
Elected Chair
Danielle Grant
Shore Action

=== Summary ===
==== Composition summary ====
Previous		Elected	
Shore Action	Danielle Grant	Shore Action	Danielle Grant
Shore Action	Pauline Gillon	Shore Action	Pauline Gillon
Shore Action	Melanie Kenrick	Shore Action	Melanie Kenrick
Shore Action	Janet Tupou	Shore Action	Janet Tupou
Shore Action	Tim Spring	Shore Action	Tim Spring
Shore Action	John Gillon	Shore Action	Raymond Tan
Shore Action	Adrian Tyler	Shore Action	Dave Kaio
Shore Action	Erica Hannam^{R}	Independent	Emma Ryburn-Phengsavath
^{R} retired

=== Kaipātiki at-large ===
Kaipātiki at-large
Affiliation	Candidate	Vote	%	+/−
Shore Action	John Gillon^{†} (withdrawn)	13,020		
Shore Action	Danielle Grant^{†}	11,368		
Shore Action	Pauline Gillon^{†}	11,155		
Shore Action	Melanie Kenrick^{†}	10,468		
Shore Action	Janet Tupou^{†}	8,535		
Shore Action	Raymond Tan	8,387		
Shore Action	Dave Kaio	8,224		
Shore Action	Tim Spring^{†}	7,806		
Independent	Emma Ryburn-Phengsavath	5,832		
Independent	Gerald Lopez	5,312		
Independent	Eric Chuah	4,660		
ACT Local	Martin Lundqvist	4,418		
Independent	Ngozi Penson	4,368		
Independent	Lofty Ned	2,715		
Conservative	Hudson Kostich	2,566		
Informal		38		
Blank		291		
Turnout		18,479		
Registered		64,243		
Shore Action hold				
Shore Action hold				
Shore Action hold				
Shore Action hold				
Shore Action hold				
Shore Action hold				
Shore Action hold				
Independent gain from Shore Action				
^{†} incumbent

=== Chair election ===
Danielle Grant (Shore Action) was elected as the new board chair unopposed.

== Māngere-Ōtāhuhu ==
2025 Māngere-Ōtāhuhu Local Board election
- 11 October 2025
- 7 seats on the Māngere-Ōtāhuhu Local Board; 4 seats needed for a majority
Party	Seats	+/–
Labour	7	0
This lists parties that won seats. See the complete results below.

Chair election
- 29 October 2025
Candidate	Kaea Inoke-Togiamua
Party	Labour
Electoral vote	Unopposed
Chair before election
Tauanu'u Nick Bakulich
Labour
Elected Chair
Kaea Inoke-Togiamua
Labour

=== Summary ===
==== Composition summary ====
Previous		Elected	
Labour	Harry Fatu Toleafoa	Labour	Harry Fatu Toleafoa
Labour	Joe Glassie-Rasmussen	Labour	Joe Glassie-Rasmussen
Labour	Christine O'Brien	Labour	Christine O'Brien
Labour	Makalita Kolo	Labour	Makalita Kolo
Labour	Kaea Inoke-Togiamua	Labour	Kaea Inoke-Togiamua
Labour	Fe'etau Peo	Labour	Fe'etau Peo
Labour	Tauanu’u Nick Bakulich^{R}	Labour	Talei Solomon-Mua
^{R} retired

=== Māngere-Ōtāhuhu at-large ===
Māngere-Ōtāhuhu at-large
Affiliation	Candidate	Vote	%	+/−
Labour	Harry Fatu Toleafoa^{†}	8,690		
Labour	Joe Glassie-Rasmussen^{†}	8,046		
Labour	Christine O'Brien^{†}	7,077		
Labour	Talei Solomon-Mua	7,076		
Labour	Makalita Kolo^{†}	6,904		
Labour	Kaea Inoke-Togiamua^{†}	6,766		
Labour	Fe'etau Peo^{†}	6,540		
Fix Auckland	Vicky Hau	4,936		
Fix Auckland	Luke Mealamu	4,887		
Green	Peter Sykes	4,096		
Independent	Sara Reihana-Tara	4,096		
Independent	Manoj Kumar	1,419		
Informal		29		
Blank		138		
Turnout		12,910		
Registered		54,429		
Labour hold				
Labour hold				
Labour hold				
Labour hold				
Labour hold				
Labour hold				
Labour hold				
^{†} incumbent

=== Chair election ===
Kaea Inoke-Togiamua (Labour) was elected as the new board chair unopposed.

== Manurewa ==
2025 Manurewa Local Board election
- 11 October 2025
- 8 seats on the Manurewa Local Board; 5 seats needed for a majority
Party	Seats	+/–
Manurewa Action Team	7	+2
#LoveManurewa	1	−2
This lists parties that won seats. See the complete results below.

Chair election
- 6 November 2025
Candidate	Heather Andrew
Party	Manurewa Action Team
Electoral vote	Unopposed
Chair before election
Matt Winiata
Manurewa Action Team
Elected Chair
Heather Andrew
Manurewa Action Team

=== Summary ===
==== Composition summary ====
Previous		Elected	
Manurewa Action Team	Glenn Murphy	Manurewa Action Team	Glenn Murphy
Manurewa Action Team	Rangi McLean	Manurewa Action Team	Rangi McLean
Manurewa Action Team	Heather Andrew	Manurewa Action Team	Heather Andrew
Manurewa Action Team	Matt Winiata^{R}	Manurewa Action Team	Marshal Ahluwalia
Manurewa Action Team	Andrew Lesa^{R}	Manurewa Action Team	Phyllis Latu
#LoveManurewa	Angela Cunningham-Marino	Manurewa Action Team	Italia Tipelu-Marsters
#LoveManurewa	Anne Candy^{R}	Manurewa Action Team	Raewyn Bhana
#LoveManurewa	Joseph Allan	#LoveManurewa	Joseph Allan
^{R} retired

=== Manurewa at-large ===
Manurewa at-large
Affiliation	Candidate	Vote	%	+/−
Manurewa Action Team	Marshal Ahluwalia	8,451		
Manurewa Action Team	Phyllis Latu	7,206		
Manurewa Action Team	Glenn Murphy^{†}	7,009		
Manurewa Action Team	Rangi McLean^{†}	6,839		
Manurewa Action Team	Italia Tipelu-Marsters	6,672		
#LoveManurewa	Joseph Allan^{†}	6,118		
Manurewa Action Team	Heather Andrew^{†}	5,973		
Manurewa Action Team	Raewyn Bhana	5,940		
#LoveManurewa	Angela Cunningham-Marino^{†}	5,767		
Manurewa Action Team	Judy Tipping	5,732		
#LoveManurewa	Toa Greening	4,599		
#LoveManurewa	Audrey Williams	4,453		
#LoveManurewa	Mandeep Kaur	4,362		
#LoveManurewa	Ally Billaney	3,912		
#LoveManurewa	William Leolahi	3,816		
#LoveManurewa	Ezekiel Robson	3,806		
Independent	Johnnie Timu	3,492		
Independent	John Robinson	2,969		
Independent	Stephen Holden	2,322		
Informal		51		
Blank		182		
Turnout		16,201		
Registered		65,243		
Manurewa Action Team hold				
Manurewa Action Team hold				
Manurewa Action Team hold				
Manurewa Action Team hold				
Manurewa Action Team gain from #LoveManurewa				
#LoveManurewa hold				
Manurewa Action Team hold				
Manurewa Action Team gain from #LoveManurewa				
^{†} incumbent

=== Chair election ===
Heather Andrew (Manurewa Action Team) was elected as the new board chair unopposed.

== Maungakiekie-Tāmaki ==
2025 Maungakiekie-Tāmaki Local Board election
- 11 October 2025
- 7 seats on the Maungakiekie-Tāmaki Local Board; 4 seats needed for a majority
Party	Seats	+/–
C&R	4	+1
Labour	3	−1
This lists parties that won seats. See the complete results below.

Chair election
- 11 November 2025
Candidate	Debbie Burrows
Party	C&R
Electoral vote	Unopposed
Chair before election
Maria Meredith
Labour
Elected Chair
Debbie Burrows
C&R

=== Summary ===
==== Composition summary ====
Subdivision	Previous		Elected	
Maungakiekie	Communities and Residents	Don Allan	Communities and Residents	Don Allan
Maungakiekie	Communities and Residents	Debbie Burrows	Communities and Residents	Debbie Burrows
Maungakiekie	Communities and Residents	Tony Woodcock	Communities and Residents	Tony Woodcock
Tāmaki	Labour	Nerissa Henry	Labour	Nerissa Henry
Tāmaki	Labour	Maria Meredith	Labour	Maria Meredith
Tāmaki	Labour	Chris Makoare	Labour	Diana Fuka
Tāmaki	Labour	Peter McGlashan	Communities and Residents	Tabetha Elliott

=== Maungakiekie subdivision ===
Maungakiekie subdivision
Affiliation	Candidate	Vote	%	+/−
Communities and Residents	Don Allan^{†}	3,147		
Communities and Residents	Debbie Burrows^{†}	3,084		
Communities and Residents	Tony Woodcock^{†}	2,538		
Labour	Malaina Taufa	2,529		
Labour	Christopher Carroll	2,430		
Labour	Glenda Fryer	2,386		
Informal		13		
Blank		142		
Turnout		6,204		
Registered		22,046		
Communities and Residents hold				
Communities and Residents hold				
Communities and Residents hold				
^{†} incumbent

=== Tāmaki subdivision ===
Tāmaki subdivision
Affiliation	Candidate	Vote	%	+/−
Labour	Nerissa Henry^{†}	3,440		
Labour	Maria Meredith^{†}	2,992		
Communities and Residents	Tabetha Elliott	2,730		
Labour	Diana Fuka	2,472		
Labour	Deborah Misiuepa	2,414		
Independent	Kellie Dawson	2,141		
Communities and Residents	Troy Elliott	2,106		
Communities and Residents	Craig Mackenzie	1,740		
Independent	Chris Makoare^{†}	1,604		
Tamaki Residents Association	Brian McDonald	1,424		
Communities and Residents	Shani Hatito	1,416		
Tamaki Residents Association	Marcia Kahui	1,356		
Independent	Patrick O'Meara	1,137		
Tamaki Residents Association	Peseta McDonald	1,059		
Independent	FaAfuhia Fia	752		
Independent	Beth Farrell	723		
Independent	Sourabh Sharma	510		
Informal		64		
Blank		186		
Turnout		8,586		
Registered		33,918		
Labour hold				
Labour hold				
Communities and Residents gain from Labour				
Labour hold				
^{†} incumbent

=== Chair election ===
Debbie Burrows (Communities and Residents) was elected as the new board chair unopposed.

== Ōrākei ==
2025 Ōrākei Local Board election
- 11 October 2025
- 7 seats on the Ōrākei Local Board; 4 seats needed for a majority
Party	Seats	+/–
C&R	6	−1
ACT Local	1	+1
This lists parties that won seats. See the complete results below.

Chair election
- 6 November 2025
Candidate	Sarah Powrie
Party	C&R
Electoral vote	Unopposed
Chair before election
Scott Milne
C&R
Elected Chair
Sarah Powrie
C&R

=== Summary ===
==== Composition summary ====
Previous		Elected	
Communities and Residents	Sarah Powrie	Communities and Residents	Sarah Powrie
Communities and Residents	Scott Milne	Communities and Residents	Scott Milne
Communities and Residents	Troy Churton	Communities and Residents	Troy Churton
Communities and Residents	Margaret Voyce	Communities and Residents	Margaret Voyce
Communities and Residents	Angus McPhee	Communities and Residents	Angus McPhee
Communities and Residents	Penny Tucker^{R}	ACT Local	Amanda Lockyer
^{R} retired

=== Ōrākei at-large ===
Ōrākei at-large
Affiliation	Candidate	Vote	%	+/−
Communities and Residents	Sarah Powrie^{†}	13,289		
Communities and Residents	Scott Milne^{†}	12,796		
Communities and Residents	Troy Churton^{†}	12,205		
Communities and Residents	David Wong^{†}	11,521		
Communities and Residents	Margaret Voyce^{†}	10,794		
Communities and Residents	Angus McPhee^{†}	10,402		
ACT Local	Amanda Lockyer	10,277		
Independent	Lauren Hawken	10,039		
Communities and Residents	Andrew Williams	9,632		
ACT Local	Rob Meredith	9,096		
ACT Local	Martin Mahler	7,684		
Independent	Wyllis Maihi	5,579		
Informal		45		
Blank		691		
Turnout		23,645		
Registered		67,812		
Communities and Residents hold				
Communities and Residents hold				
Communities and Residents hold				
Communities and Residents hold				
Communities and Residents hold				
Communities and Residents hold				
ACT Local gain from Communities and Residents				
^{†} incumbent

=== Chair election ===
Sarah Powrie (Communities and Residents) was elected as the new board chair unopposed.

== Ōtara-Papatoetoe ==
2025 Ōtara-Papatoetoe Local Board election
- 11 October 2025
- Registered: 58,673
- Turnout: 16,109 (27.46%)
- 7 seats on the Ōtara-Papatoetoe Local Board; 4 seats needed for a majority
Party	Seats	+/–
vacant	4	
Labour	3	+1
This lists parties that won seats. See the complete results below.

Chair election
- 4 November 2025
Candidate	Kushma Nair
Party	Papatoetoe-Otara Action Team
Chair before election
Apulu Reece Autagavaia
Labour
Elected Chair
Kushma Nair
Papatoetoe-Otara Action Team

=== Summary ===
==== Composition summary ====
Subdivision	Previous		Elected	
Ōtara	Labour	Apulu Autagavaia	Labour	Apulu Autagavaia
Ōtara	Independent	Topou Folau	Labour	Topou Folau
Ōtara	Labour	Swanie Nelson	Labour	Li'amanaia Kaisara
Papatoetoe	Labour	Ofa Dewes^{R}	election declared void	
Papatoetoe	Labour	Vi Hausia	election declared void	
Papatoetoe	Labour	Ashraf Choudhary	election declared void	
Papatoetoe	Independently Papatoetoe	Albert Lim	election declared void	
^{R} retired

=== Ōtara subdivision ===
Ōtara subdivision
Affiliation	Candidate	Vote	%	+/−
Labour	Apulu Autagavaia^{†}	3,007	60.69	
Labour	Li'amanaia Kaisara	2,649	53.46	
Labour	Topou Folau^{†}	2,222	44.84	
Independent	Swanie Nelson^{†}	1,586	32.01	
Independent	Zak Tulua	888	17.92	
Papatoetoe-Otara Action Team	Peresitene Tapumanaia	816	16.47	
Independent	Pele Nili	736	14.85	
ACT Local	Henriette Devoe	696	14.05	
Independent	Jarvis Tusini	473	9.55	
Informal		20	0.40	
Blank		59	1.19	
Turnout		4,955	(21.16)	
Registered		23,420		
Labour hold				
Labour hold				
Labour gain from Independent				
^{†} incumbent

=== Papatoetoe subdivision (declared void) ===
This election was declared void after irregularities were discovered; a by-election was held to fill the vacancies that resulted from this.

Papetoetoe subdivision
Affiliation	Candidate	Vote	%	+/−
Papatoetoe-Otara Action Team	Paramjeet Singh	5,104	45.76	
Papatoetoe-Otara Action Team	Sandeep Saini	5,081	45.55	
Papatoetoe-Otara Action Team	Kushma Nair	4,684	41.99	
Papatoetoe-Otara Action Team	Kunal Bhalla	4,493	40.28	
Labour	Vi Hausia^{†}	3,254	29.17	
Communities and Residents	Chris Latham	2,769	24.83	
Labour	Ashraf Choudhary^{†}	2,679	24.02	
Labour	Avinash Dhaliwal	2,475	22.19	
Independently Papatoetoe	Albert Lim^{†}	2,371	21.26	
Labour	Raj Singh	2,127	19.07	
Independently Papatoetoe	Peter Dons	1,794	16.08	
Independent	Futi Ka	1,445	12.95	
Independently Papatoetoe	Nazia Ali	1,028	9.22	
Informal		30	0.27	
Blank		85	0.76	
Turnout		11,154	(31.64)	
Registered		35,253		
Election declared void				
^{†} incumbent

=== Chair election ===
Prior to the results of the 2025 election in the Papatoetoe subdivision being voided on 16 December 2025, Papatoetoe Otara Action Team board member Kushma Nair had been elected as board chair at the board's inaugural meeting on 4 November 2025, with Paramjeet Singh elected as deputy chair.

== Papakura ==
2025 Papakura Local Board election
- 11 October 2025
- 6 seats on the Papakura Local Board; 4 seats needed for a majority
Party	Seats	+/–
Papakura Action Team	6	0
This lists parties that won seats. See the complete results below.

Chair election
- 29 October 2025
Candidate	Kelvin Hieatt
Party	Papakura Action Team
Electoral vote	Unopposed
Chair before election
Brent Catchpole
Papakura Action Team
Elected Chair
Kelvin Hieatt
Papakura Action Team

=== Summary ===
==== Composition summary ====
Previous		Elected	
Papakura Action Team	Brent Catchpole	Papakura Action Team	Brent Catchpole
Papakura Action Team	Andrew Webster	Papakura Action Team	Andrew Webster
Papakura Action Team	Felicity Auva'a	Papakura Action Team	Felicity Auva'a
Papakura Action Team	Jan Robinson	Papakura Action Team	Jan Robinson
Papakura Action Team	George Hawkins	Papakura Action Team	George Hawkins
Papakura Action Team	Kevin Hieatt	Papakura Action Team	Kevin Hieatt

=== Papakura at-large ===
Papakura at-large
Affiliation	Candidate	Vote	%	+/−
Papakura Action Team	Brent Catchpole^{†}	5,620		
Papakura Action Team	Andrew Webster^{†}	5,340		
Papakura Action Team	Felicity Auva'a^{†}	5,312		
Papakura Action Team	Jan Robinson^{†}	5,229		
Papakura Action Team	George Hawkins^{†}	4,957		
Papakura Action Team	Kevin Hieatt^{†}	4,652		
#LovePapakura	Caitlyn Smythe	3,196		
#LovePapakura	Craig Hansen	3,121		
#LovePapakura	Laura Fourie	3,043		
#LovePapakura	Piritaka Manuel	2,757		
#LovePapakura	Kim Squire	2,490		
#LovePapakura	Ranbir Pabla	2,216		
Independent	Karin Kerr	2,189		
Independent	Andrea Beard	1,739		
ACT Local	Prasad Gawande	1,607		
Independent	Simon Matta	1,139		
Informal		44		
Blank		160		
Turnout		10,896		
Registered		46,406		
Papakura Action Team hold				
Papakura Action Team hold				
Papakura Action Team hold				
Papakura Action Team hold				
Papakura Action Team hold				
Papakura Action Team hold				
^{†} incumbent

=== Chair election ===
Kelvin Hieatt (Papakura Action Team) was elected as the new board chair unopposed.

== Puketāpapa ==
2025 Puketāpapa Local Board election
- 11 October 2025
- 6 seats on the Puketāpapa Local Board; 4 seats needed for a majority
Party	Seats	+/–
C&R	4	0
City Vision	2	0
This lists parties that won seats. See the complete results below.

Chair election
- 6 November 2025
Candidate	Roseanne Hay
Party	C&R
Electoral vote	Unopposed
Chair before election
Ella Kumar
C&R
Elected Chair
Roseanne Hay
C&R

=== Summary ===
==== Composition summary ====
Previous		Elected	
Communities and Residents	Fiona Lai	Communities and Residents	Fiona Lai
Communities and Residents	Ella Kumar	Communities and Residents	Ella Kumar
Communities and Residents	Roseanne Hay	Communities and Residents	Roseanne Hay
Communities and Residents	Mark Pervan	Communities and Residents	Brendan Larmer
Roskill Community Voice	Jon Turner	City Vision	Jon Turner
Roskill Community Voice	Bobby Shen^{R}	City Vision	Rowan Cant
^{R} retired

=== Puketāpapa at-large ===
Puketāpapa at-large
Affiliation	Candidate	Vote	%	+/−
Communities and Residents	Fiona Lai^{†}	5,645		
Communities and Residents	Ella Kumar^{†}	5,534		
Communities and Residents	Roseanne Hay^{†}	5,477		
City Vision	Jon Turner^{†}	4,688		
City Vision	Rowan Cant	4,494		
Communities and Residents	Brendan Larmer	4,362		
City Vision	Raphaela Rose	4,355		
Communities and Residents	Mark Pervan^{†}	4,172		
City Vision	Daniel Cliffords	4,079		
Communities and Residents	Bala Beeram	3,887		
City Vision	Soraiya Doud	3,649		
City Vision	Miriam Hartmann	3,602		
Independent	Mark Price	2,083		
Independent	Jessica Ralph	2,044		
Independent	Abann Yor	1,486		
Informal		35		
Blank		235		
Turnout		11,583		
Registered		44,111		
Communities and Residents hold				
Communities and Residents hold				
Communities and Residents hold				
City Vision hold				
City Vision hold				
Communities and Residents hold				
^{†} incumbent

=== Chair election ===
Roseanne Hay (Communities and Residents) was elected as the new board chair unopposed.

== Rodney ==
2025 Rodney Local Board election
- 11 October 2025
- 9 seats on the Rodney Local Board; 5 seats needed for a majority
Party	Seats	+/–
Independent	9	+6
This lists parties that won seats. See the complete results below.

Chair election
- 5 November 2025

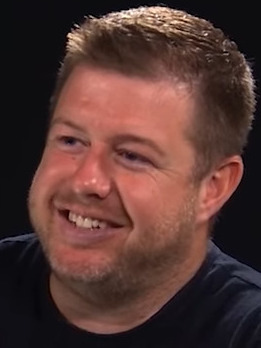
Candidate	Guy Wishart	Geoff Upson
Party	Independent	Independent
Electoral vote	6	3
Chair before election
Brent Bailey
Rodney First
Elected Chair
Guy Wishart
Independent

=== Summary ===
==== Composition summary ====
Subdivision	Previous		Elected	
Dairy Flat	Rodney First	Louise Johnston	Independent	Lisa Whyte
Kumeū	Rodney First	Guy Wishart	Independent	Guy Wishart
Kumeū	Rodney First	Brent Bailey	Independent	Matt Ross
Kumeū	Rodney First	Mark Dennis	seat abolished	
Kumeū	Independent	Geoff Upson	seat abolished	
Northern Rodney	new subdivision		Independent	Paul Manton
Northern Rodney	new subdivision		Independent	Colin Smith
Southern Kaipara	new subdivision		Independent	Mark Dennis
Southern Kaipara	new subdivision		Independent	Geoff Upson
Warkworth	Rodney First	Ivan Wagstaff	Independent	Ivan Wagstaff
Warkworth	Independent	Tim Holdgate	Independent	Tim Holdgate
Warkworth	Rodney First	Michelle Carmichael	seat abolished	
Wellsford	Independent	Colin Smith	seat abolished	

=== Dairy Flat subdivision ===
Dairy Flat subdivision
Affiliation	Candidate	Vote	%	+/−
Independent	Lisa Whyte	1,252	53.46	
Independent	Peter Brydon	633	27.03	
Independent	Warwick Hojem	403	17.21	
Informal		3	0.13	
Blank		51	2.18	
Turnout		2,342		
Registered		7,381		
Independent gain from Rodney First				

=== Kumeū subdivision ===
Kumeū subdivision
Affiliation	Candidate	Vote	%	+/−
Independent	Guy Wishart^{†}	2,045		
Independent	Matt Ross	1,685		
Independent	Gemma Donaldson	1,496		
Independent	Katie Versteeg	1,140		
Independent	Brent Bailey^{†}	978		
Independent	Zach Stark	142		
Informal		6		
Blank		75		
Turnout		4,243		
Registered		13,007		
Independent gain from Rodney First				
Independent gain from Rodney First				
^{†} incumbent

=== Northern Rodney subdivision ===
Northern Rodney subdivision
Affiliation	Candidate	Vote	%
Independent	Paul Manton	2,321	
Independent	Colin Smith	2,174	
Independent	James Pemberton	842	
Independent	Joshua Grimstock	679	
Independent	Greg Doherty	558	
Informal		4	
Blank		85	
Turnout		4,012	
Registered		10,871	
Independent win (new subdivision)			
Independent win (new subdivision)			

=== Southern Kaipara subdivision ===
Southern Kaipara subdivision
Affiliation	Candidate	Vote	%
Independent	Mark Dennis	2,509	
Independent	Geoff Upson	2,475	
Independent	Rob Upson	1,500	
Informal		3	
Blank		66	
Turnout		4,064	
Registered		11,433	
Independent win (new subdivision)			
Independent win (new subdivision)			

=== Warkworth subdivision ===
Warkworth subdivision
Affiliation	Candidate	Vote	%	+/−
Independent	Ivan Wagstaff^{†}	4,121		
Independent	Tim Holdgate^{†}	3,305		
Independent	David Robb	1,342		
Independent	Taabetha Tebau	1,111		
Informal		3		
Blank		102		
Turnout		5,719		
Registered		13,357		
Independent gain from Rodney First				
Independent hold				
^{†} incumbent

=== Chair election ===
Guy Wishart (Independent) was elected as the new board chair, defeating Geoff Upston (Independent) 6-to-3.

== Upper Harbour ==
2025 Upper Harbour Local Board election
- 11 October 2025
- 6 seats on the Upper Harbour Local Board; 4 seats needed for a majority
Party	Seats	+/–
Living Upper Harbour	4	+1
Independent	2	−1
This lists parties that won seats. See the complete results below.

Chair election
- 6 November 2025
Candidate	Anna Atkinson
Party	Living Upper Harbour
Electoral vote	Unopposed
Chair before election
Anna Atkinson
Living Upper Harbour
Elected Chair
Anna Atkinson
Living Upper Harbour

=== Summary ===
==== Composition summary ====
Previous		Elected	
Living Upper Harbour	Anna Atkinson	Living Upper Harbour	Anna Atkinson
Living Upper Harbour	Kyle Parker	Living Upper Harbour	Kyle Parker
Living Upper Harbour	Sylvia Yang	Living Upper Harbour	Sylvia Yang
Independent	John McLean	Living Upper Harbour	Rebecca Huang
Independent	Uzra Balouch	Independent	Uzra Balouch

=== Upper Harbour at-large ===
Upper Harbour at-large
Affiliation	Candidate	Vote	%	+/−
Living Upper Harbour	Anna Atkinson^{†}	8,222		
Independent	Uzra Balouch^{†}	7,336		
Living Upper Harbour	Kyle Parker^{†}	7,120		
Living Upper Harbour	Sylvia Yang^{†}	6,636		
Living Upper Harbour	Rebecca Huang	5,853		
Independent	Selena Wong	4,775		
Independent	John McLean^{†}	4,509		
Independent	John Loau	4,329		
Independent	Callum Blair^{†}	4,310		
Independent	David Cook	3,421		
Independent	John Riddell	2,948		
Independent	Apurv Shukla	2,469		
Independent	Kent Neville-White	2,064		
Informal		42		
Blank		545		
Turnout		14,418		
Registered		54,657		
Living Upper Harbour hold				
Independent hold				
Living Upper Harbour hold				
Living Upper Harbour hold				
Living Upper Harbour gain from Independent				
Independent gain from Independent				
^{†} incumbent

=== Chair election ===
Incumbent chair Anna Atkinson (Living Upper Harbour) was re-elected as the board chair unopposed.

== Waiheke ==
2025 Waiheke Local Board election
- 11 October 2025
- 5 seats on the Waiheke Local Board; 3 seats needed for a majority
Party	Seats	+/–
Independent	5	0
This lists parties that won seats. See the complete results below.

Chair election
- 3 November 2025
Candidate	Kylee Matthews
Party	Independent
Electoral vote	Unopposed
Chair before election
Cath Handley
Independent
Elected Chair
Kylee Matthews
Independent

=== Summary ===
==== Composition summary ====
Previous		Elected	
Independent	Kylee Matthews	Independent	Kylee Matthews
Independent	Bianca Ranson	Independent	Bianca Ranson
Independent	Paul Walden	Independent	Damian Sycamore
Independent	Cath Handley^{R}	Independent	Eric Hillman
Independent	Robin Tucker^{R}	Independent	Norman Robins
^{R} retired

=== Waiheke at-large ===
Waiheke at-large
Affiliation	Candidate	Vote	%	+/−
Independent	Kylee Matthews^{†}	2,115		
Independent	Damian Sycamore	1,844		
Independent	Eric Hillman	1,736		
Independent	Norman Robins	1,626		
Independent	Bianca Ranson^{†}	1,518		
Independent	Paul Walden^{†}	1,500		
Independent	Grant Crawford	1,263		
Independent	Wayne McIntosh	1,030		
Independent	Xan Hamilton	906		
Independent	Josie Heap Rainer	896		
Independent	Todd Parkin	708		
Independent	Ollie Lequeux	283		
Informal		11		
Blank		39		
Turnout		3,726		
Registered		7,308		
Independent hold				
Independent gain from Independent				
Independent gain from Independent				
Independent gain from Independent				
Independent hold				
^{†} incumbent

=== Chair election ===
Kylee Matthews (Independent) was elected as the new board chair unopposed.

== Waitākere Ranges ==
2025 Waitākere Ranges Local Board election
- 11 October 2025
- 6 seats on the Waitākere Ranges Local Board; 4 seats needed for a majority
Party	Seats	+/–
Future West	5	+1
WestWards	1	−1
This lists parties that won seats. See the complete results below.

Chair election
Candidate	Mark Allen
Party	Future West
Electoral vote	Unopposed
Chair before election
Greg Presland
Future West
Elected Chair
Mark Allen
Future West

=== Summary ===
==== Composition summary ====
Previous		Elected	
Future West	Mark Allen	Future West	Mark Allen
Future West	Greg Presland	Future West	Greg Presland
Future West	Liz Manley^{R}	Future West	Michelle Hutton
Future West	Sandra Coney^{R}	Future West	Hannah Slade
WestWards	Linda Poutauaine	Future West	Jess Rose
WestWards	Michelle Clayton	WestWards	Allan Geddes
^{R} retired

=== Waitākere Ranges at-large ===
Waitākere Ranges at-large
Affiliation	Candidate	Vote	%	+/−
Future West	Mark Allen^{†}	5,450		
Future West	Greg Presland^{†}	5,024		
Future West	Michelle Hutton	4,937		
Future West	Hannah Slade	4,846		
WestWards	Allan Geddes	4,828		
Future West	Jess Rose	4,828		
WestWards	Linda Poutauaine^{†}	4,715		
WestWards	Roman Thomas	4,615		
WestWards	Angus Cathcart	4,567		
WestWards	Kevin Murphy	4,329		
Future West	Mark Roberts	3,827		
Independent	Michelle Clayton^{†}	3,544		
WestWards	Penelope Miller	3,113		
Independent	Bianca O'Keefe	2,817		
Independent	Diana Blomfield	2,443		
Independent	Alan Mann	1,732		
Independent	Iuliana Rodinciuc	1,189		
Independent	Jamaine Ross	768		
Independent	Stephen Johnson	686		
Independent	Rizwan Qureshi	520		
Informal		49		
Blank		352		
Turnout		13,396		
Registered		39,844		
Future West hold				
Future West hold				
Future West hold				
Future West hold				
WestWards hold				
Future West gain from WestWards				
^{†} incumbent

=== Chair election ===
Waitākere Ranges (Future West) was elected as the new board chair unopposed.

== Waitematā ==
2025 Waitematā Local Board election
- 11 October 2025
- 7 seats on the Waitematā Local Board; 4 seats needed for a majority
Party	Seats	+/–
City Vision	5	+2
C&R	2	−2
This lists parties that won seats. See the complete results below.

Chair election
- 5 November 2025
Candidate	Alex Bonham
Party	City Vision
Electoral vote	Unopposed
Chair before election
Genevieve Sage
C&R
Elected Chair
Alex Bonham
City Vision

=== Summary ===
==== Composition summary ====
Previous		Elected	
City Vision	Alex Bonham	City Vision	Alex Bonham
City Vision	Anahera Rawiri	City Vision	Anahera Rawiri
City Vision	Richard Northey^{R}	City Vision	Caitlin Wilson
Communities and Residents	Genevieve Sage^{R}	City Vision	Peter Elliott
Communities and Residents	Allan Matson	City Vision	Kara Kennedy
Communities and Residents	Greg Moyle	Communities and Residents	Greg Moyle
Communities and Residents	Sarah Trotman	Communities and Residents	Sarah Trotman
^{R} retired

=== Waitematā at-large ===
Waitematā at-large
Affiliation	Candidate	Vote	%	+/−
City Vision	Alex Bonham^{†}	8,568		
City Vision	Caitlin Wilson	8,480		
City Vision	Anahera Rawiri^{†}	7,696		
City Vision	Peter Elliott	7,556		
City Vision	Kara Kennedy	7,436		
Communities and Residents	Greg Moyle^{†}	6,860		
Communities and Residents	Sarah Trotman^{†}	6,592		
Communities and Residents	Allan Matson^{†}	6,084		
City Vision	Connor Sharp	5,837		
City Vision	Theo van de Klundert	5,553		
Communities and Residents	Muy Chhour	5,426		
Communities and Residents	Anne Batley Burton	5,369		
Communities and Residents	Leo Grachev	4,874		
Communities and Residents	Nick Nielson	4,587		
Independent	Mark Crysell	4,220		
Independent	Taylor Marston	3,058		
Independent	Pete Marshall	3,022		
Independent	Gael Baldock	2,273		
Independent	Selena Renner	2,239		
Independent	Grayson Goffe	2,120		
Informal		63		
Blank		645		
Turnout		18,198		
Registered		57,928		
City Vision hold				
City Vision hold				
City Vision hold				
City Vision gain from Communities and Residents				
City Vision gain from Communities and Residents				
Communities and Residents hold				
Communities and Residents hold				
^{†} incumbent

=== Chair election ===
Alexandra Bonham (City Vision) was elected as the new board chair unopposed.

== Whau ==
2025 Whau Local Board election
- 11 October 2025
- 7 seats on the Whau Local Board; 4 seats needed for a majority
Party	Seats	+/–
Labour	4	−1
Independent	3	+1
This lists parties that won seats. See the complete results below.

Chair election
- 29 October 2025
Candidate	Kay Thomas
Party	Labour
Electoral vote	Unopposed
Chair before election
Kay Thomas
Labour
Elected Chair
Kay Thomas
Labour

=== Summary ===
==== Composition summary ====
Previous		Elected	
Labour	Fasiuta Amosa	Labour	Fasiuta Amosa
Labour	Kay Thomas	Labour	Kay Thomas
Labour	Valeria Gascoigne	Labour	Fania Kapao
Labour	Sarah Paterson-Hamlin^{R}	Labour	Rebecca Thomson
Independent	Warren Piper	Independent	Warren Piper
Independent	Catherine Farmer	Independent	Catherine Farmer
Independent	Ross Clow	Independent	Ross Clow
^{R} retired

=== Whau at-large ===
Whau at-large
Affiliation	Candidate	Vote	%	+/−
Labour	Fasiuta Amosa^{†}	7,547		
Independent	Warren Piper^{†}	6,699		
Independent	Catherine Farmer^{†}	6,266		
Labour	Kay Thomas^{†}	6,208		
Labour	Fania Kapao	6,160		
Labour	Rebecca Thomson	6,095		
Independent	Ross Clow^{†}	5,867		
Labour	Barrie-John Partridge	5,819		
Labour	Valeria Gascoigne^{†}	5,736		
Independent	Morgan Luxton	5,098		
Labour	Aadil Basha	4,976		
Independent	Almo Wong	4,836		
Voice of the People	Paul Davie	3,824		
Voice of the People	Kathryn Davie	3,436		
Independent	Madhavi Nyayapati	3,116		
Independent	Jitesh Ganatra	2,089		
Informal		33		
Blank		309		
Turnout		15,180		
Registered		58,957		
Labour hold				
Independent hold				
Independent gain from Labour (incumbent change affiliation)				
Labour hold				
Labour hold				
Labour hold				
Independent hold				
^{†} incumbent

=== Chair election ===
Incumbent chair Kay Thomas (Labour) was re-elected as the board chair unopposed.
