= Karl Mokaraka =

New Zealand political candidate and heckler

- Born: 1976 or 1977 (age 49–50)
- Known for: Heckling of politicians
- Political party: Vision NZ
- Children: 4

Karl Mokaraka (born 1976 or 1977) is a New Zealand political candidate most well known for his heckling of politicians. A member of the Vision NZ party, Mokaraka has heckled senior New Zealand politicians such as Chris Hipkins, David Seymour, and Christopher Luxon. He stood for Vision NZ at the 2023 election in Panmure-Ōtāhuhu, and in 2026 for Ōtāhuhu.

== Politics ==
=== 2023 general election ===
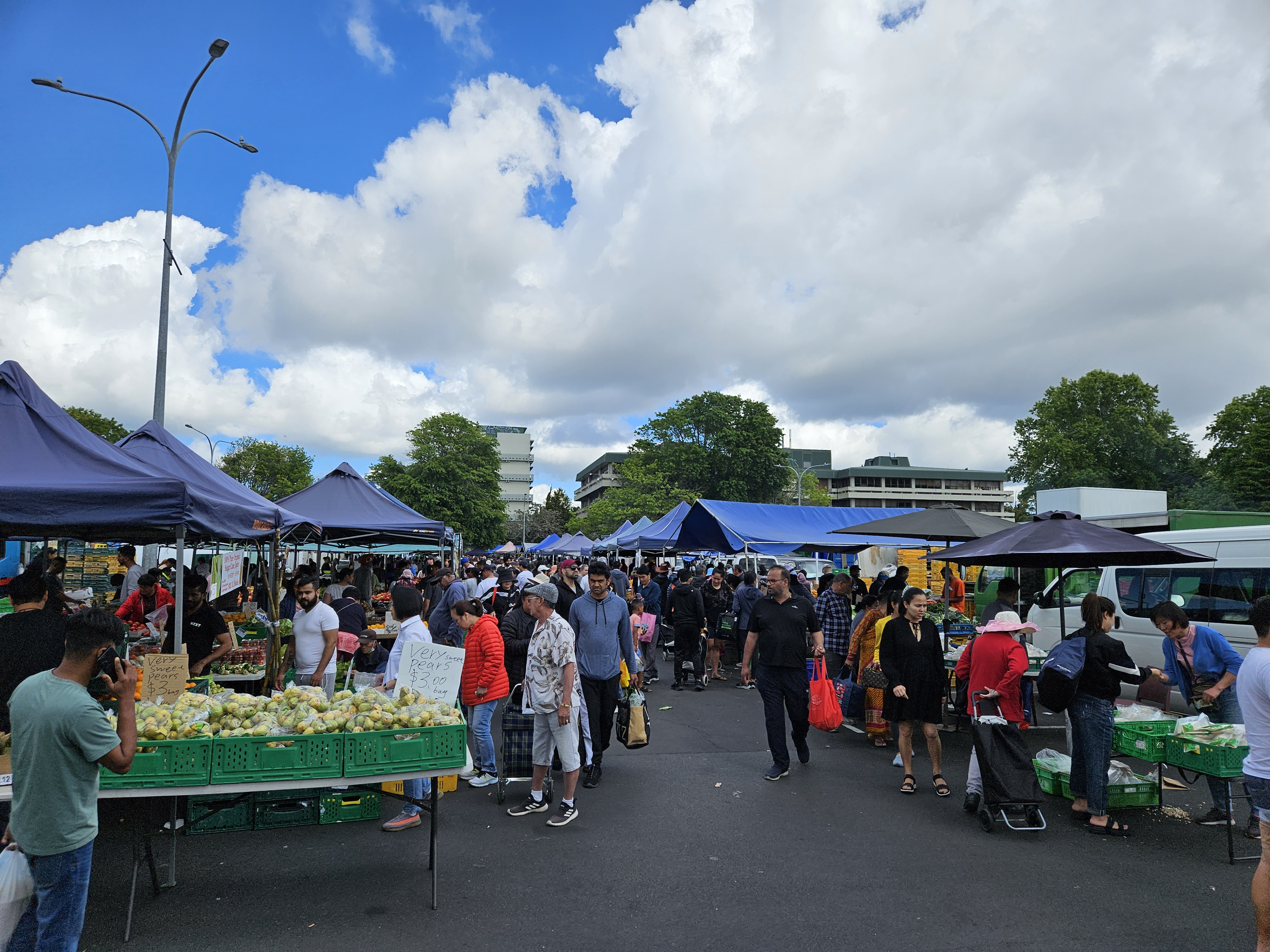
Mokaraka protested against Chris Hipkins at the Ōtara Markets.

Mokaraka stood at the 2023 New Zealand general election for Vision NZ, contesting the Panmure-Ōtāhuhu electorate. At the Ōtara Markets in August, he led a protest against Labour leader Chris Hipkins. Later that same month, Mokaraka heckled Prime Minister Christopher Luxon from behind a fence, while Luxon was giving a media briefing in Pakuranga. Mokaraka's back-and-forth exchange with Luxon, which lasted for several minutes, resulted in memes on social media. After another heckling of David Seymour at ACT's campaign launch, Mokaraka began to be described as a serial heckler, a label he rejects. Mokaraka told The New Zealand Herald that he was motivated to heckle at political events to represent whānau without a voice.

Mokaraka placed fifth out of six candidates in Panmure-Ōtāhuhu, receiving 1.3% of the candidate vote.

=== Local elections and other activities, 2024–2026 ===
Mokaraka attended the final presentation of the Royal Commission of Inquiry into Abuse in Care in 2024 with William Wilson. He had previously testified to the Royal Commission in support of Wilson, both having been victims of abuse while in state care. During Luxon's apology in Parliament to the survivors of abuse in state care, Mokaraka interjected from the public gallery, saying "make New Zealand great" and "we need Jesus back in this Parliament". He was dragged away from the edge of the gallery by security guards before walking off.

Mokaraka interrupted a debate at Ngā Whare Waatea Marae for the 2025 Tāmaki Makaurau by-election to protest the exclusion of Hannah Tamaki, Vision NZ's candidate in the by-election, after which he was removed from the marae. In early 2026, he heckled again at a speech by Chris Bishop, the Minister of Housing, asking Bishop about housing issues in South Auckland.

Mokaraka stood as an independent candidate for the 2026 Ōtara-Papatoetoe Local Board by-election. He cited his background in the Ōtara community and previous roles in finance and business as motivators to stand for local office. He was unsuccessful in his candidacy.

=== 2026 general election ===
Mokaraka is standing again for Vision NZ at the 2026 New Zealand general election, in the Ōtāhuhu electorate. Speaking to Pacific Media Network, Mokaraka said that Pacific families in the area were being overlooked, and that Labour incumbent Jenny Salesa had not delivered on promises made. He heckled Hipkins again at the Ōtara Markets in September, asking him "what is a woman?"

On 7 November, Mokaraka came sixth place in the Ōtāhuhu electorate, with 242 votes based on preliminary results. Vision NZ won 1,529 votes or 0.06% of the party vote based on preliminary results, below the five percent threshold needed to enter Parliament.

== Personal life ==
Mokaraka is of Samoan and Māori background, and has four children. He is affiliated with the Ngāpuhi and Ngāti Raukawa iwi. At the time of the 2023 election, he was 46 years of age.
