= Cindy Diver =

Actor in New Zealand, founder of TheatreWorks

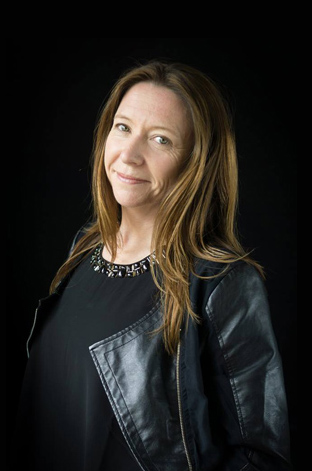
- Education: University of Otago
- Occupations: company director, actor, writer, theatre director
- Known for: verbatim theatre
- Relatives: Charles Diver (grandfather)

Cindy Diver is a New Zealand writer, theatre director, actor, and owner and director of TheatreWorks Ltd, a company that provides casting services as well as acting classes. Diver is most notable for creating and producing verbatim theatre productions on themes such as family violence and dementia.

== Biography ==
Diver completed a post graduate diploma in theatre studies at the University of Otago in Dunedin, New Zealand. She was a founding member of Kilimogo Productions. In 1992, with Martin Phelan, she founded her company, TheatreWorks Ltd. Under Diver's management TheatreWorks Ltd continues to provide actor casting services and acting classes. Diver has also helped with the establishment of the Simulated Patient Development Unit at the University of Otago Medical School. The unit employs actors to play patients with whom medical students are trained to interact. Diver also teaches drama to school children and adults.

=== Verbatim theatre ===
In 2009 Diver collaborated with Hilary Halba, Erica Newlands, Simon O'Connor, Danny Still, and Stuart Young to create Hush, a verbatim theatre production about family violence. Diver went on to star in the 2012 play Be | Longing, detailing the experiences of New Zealand immigrants. In 2014 Diver co-created another verbatim theatre production The Keys are in the Margarine: A Verbatim Play about Dementia. This latter play toured New Zealand with the assistance of Brain Research New Zealand.

=== Random Acts of Art project ===
In 2020, during New Zealand's first COVID-19 lockdown period, Diver launched the Random Acts of Art project. This project was formed with the intention of lifting spirits though impromptu theatre events and productions. During the 11 months of the project's existence it supported the creation of 33 events in and around Dunedin.

As at 2021 Diver continues to run TheatreWorks Ltd and is a board member of Wow! Productions, a Dunedin-based theatre collective.

== Selected productions ==
Hush by Hilary Halba, Cindy Diver, Erica Newlands, Simon O'Connor, Danny Still and Stuart Young.

Be | Longing by Hilary Halba and Stuart Young. Cast: Stuart Young, Hilary Halba, Cindy Diver, Will Spicer, Alex Wilson, Karen Elliot, Julie Edwards, Anya Tate-Manning and Stephen Butterworth.

The Keys are in the Margarine: A Verbatim Play about Dementia by Cindy Diver, Susie Lawless, and Stuart Young.

Wahine Mātātoa: The (Mostly) True Story of Erihāpeti Pātahi by Cindy Diver, Grace Turpia, Tōmairangi Paterson-Waaka, Emma Katene, Manu Hepi.

== Family ==
Cindy divers has two children, Harrison Diver and Mackenzie Phelan. Cindy diver's grandfather Charles Diver was also the inventor of pineapple lumps.
