= The Māori Sidesteps =

New Zealand music band and performance group

The Māori Sidesteps are a New Zealand musical and performance group founded by Jamie McCaskill in 2016, based in Wellington. The band reinterprets the musical tradition of Māori showbands such as The Quin Tikis, The Maori Hi Five, and the Howard Morrison Quartet. They perform musical skits and songs, some with lyrics changed to parody and satirise issues arising from the colonisation of New Zealand. Members of the group have included Regan Taylor, Rob Mokaraka (Former Member), Cohen Holloway, Jamie McCaskill, Erroll Anderson and Jerome Leota. The costumes for the band were designed by Suzanne Tamaki. The band has featured in a sixteen episode, self-titled web series The Māori Sidesteps in 2016 and in the six episode Maori Television series Hari with the Māori Side Steps in 2021.

In 2019 The Māori Sidesteps worked with the New Zealand Ministry of Education to create a series of videos aimed at encouraging parents of children and young people to enroll in courses to learn and be taught in Te Reo. They've performed in various areas around New Zealand. On late September and early October of 2022, The Māori Sidesteps performed at the Court Theatre in Christchurch, New Zealand.
