= Bill Logan (activist) =

New Zealand political activist

William King Logan (born 26 July 1948) is a New Zealand political activist, writer, and counsellor. Born in the Hutt Valley, he was educated at Scots College, Wellington, and at Victoria University of Wellington, where he completed the requirements for a BA (Hons) in 1970 and graduated in 1971. He is best known for his public role in the campaign for homosexual law reform in New Zealand during the 1980s.

== Homosexual law reform ==
Logan was a prominent participant in the 1986 Homosexual Law Reform Bill campaign.

The Evening Post identified him as a principal spokesperson for the Wellington Gay Task Force in 1985.

The New Zealand Herald later described him as "the poster boy for the homosexual law reform movement".

== AIDS advocacy ==
Logan was involved in AIDS advocacy in the mid-1980s. He served as Wellington co-ordinator of the AIDS Support Network and later as Wellington co-ordinator of the New Zealand AIDS Foundation.
