= Pineapple lumps =

Confection

- Alternative names: Pineapple chunks
- Type: Confectionery
- Place of origin: New Zealand
- Created by: Charles Diver
- Main ingredients: Chocolate, sugar, pineapple flavouring

Pineapple lumps or pineapple chunks are a chocolate-covered confection with a soft, chewy pineapple-flavoured middle from New Zealand. They are often identified as Kiwiana.

== History ==
Charles Diver's original recipe

The Regina Confectionery Company in Oamaru introduced pineapple chunks in 1952. Charles Diver, the confectionery chief and floor production-manager at Regina who would later formulate other classic Kiwi sweets, had the task of using up waste product from other lollies of the time. One sweet in particular — an early version of the chocolate fish with a pineapple-flavoured marshmallow middle — resulted in the most marshmallow left over, which Diver used to create pineapple chunks. The product's name was changed to pineapple lumps by Regina in the early 1960s to give it a more catchy name.

An alternative origin story states that it was the managing director of Regina, John Percy ('Jack') McNamara, who invented the pineapple lump. He is said to have worked with the factory manager Charles McLaughlin, a trained confectioner, to develop the recipe. McLaughlin is said to have prepared the liquid pineapple lump recipe in boiling pans, then to have delivered it to Diver in the starch room for moulding in a Baker-Perkins Master Machine.

Cadbury obtained the pineapple lumps name and began manufacturing and selling them under its Pascall brand. In 1995, Regina was bought by Nestlé NZ which shut down the Oamaru factory in 2001. Innovex Holdings purchased the factory from Nestlé, and in June 2001, established Rainbow Confectionery. Rainbow sells pineapple chunks under its own brand and, in 2013, it also released pineapple chunks based on a slightly modified version of Diver's original recipe under the Regina brand.

Pascall's Pineapple Lumps were the last product manufactured at the Cadbury factory in Dunedin until its closure by Mondelez International in March 2018. Since the sale of all New Zealand-made stock, all Pascall Pineapple Lumps sold in New Zealand have been imported from Australia.

== Related products ==
In 2013, Fonterra released a limited edition Pineapple Lumps-flavoured milk in New Zealand after signing a licensing deal with Cadbury. In 2017, Jaffas Lumps were released in New Zealand by Cadbury for a limited time. In 2019, Cadbury produced a fusion between Perky Nana bars and Pineapple Lumps called Perky Nana Lumps which were released as a limited edition product in New Zealand. In 2019, Cadbury released a limited edition Dairy Milk chocolate block with Pascall Pineapple Lumps inside. Released initially in New Zealand, it was later also released in Australia. In 2020, Cadbury produced a limited edition mashup of Snifters and Pineapple Lumps, known as Snifters Lumps. In February 2024 a Pineapple Lump flavoured Squiggles biscuit was released.

As of 2023, Pams markets a product similar to Pineapple Lumps using the name "Pineapple Flavoured Bites". Countdown also sells a similar product as "Pineapple Pieces".
