= Apirana Taylor =

New Zealand writer, painter and musician

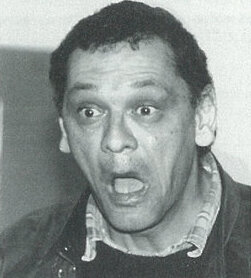
- Taylor in 1996
- Born: 15 March 1955 (age 71); Wellington, New Zealand
- Occupations: Poet, novelist
- Relatives: Rangimoana Taylor (brother), Riwia Brown (sister)
- Writing career
- Period: 1979–2004

Apirana Taylor (born 15 March 1955) is a New Zealand writer known for his poetry, short stories, novels and plays.

== Biography ==
Born in Wellington 15 March 1955, Apirana Taylor is of Pākehā and Māori descent with affiliations to Ngāti Porou, Te Whānau-ā-Apanui and Ngāti Ruanui.

Taylor was a runner-up for the Pegasus Prize in 1985, for He Rau Aroha: A Hundred Leaves of Love.

He was a prominent member of the Māori theatre cooperative Te Ohu Whakaari alongside his brother Rangimoana Taylor, who founded the group, and their sister Riwia Brown. Plays of Taylor that Te Ohu Whakaari presented included Kohanga about the kohanga reo movement of Māori language revival and Te Whānau a Tuanui Jones. Kohanga was awarded 'best debut play' by the Dominion Post.

== Works ==
Taylor has published three volumes of poetry – Eyes of the Ruru (1979), Soft Leaf Falls of the Moon (1997) and Te Ata Kura; the red-tipped dawn (2004); three short-story collections; a novel, He Tangi Aroha (1993); 3 CDs (two are poetry with music, the other is children’s stories) and two plays.

Taylor's play Whaea Kairau: Mother Hundred Eater (1995) first produced by Taki Rua is described as a 'seminal Maori theatre work'. The play is an epic story set in the late 1840s in New Zealand, the central character is a dispossessed Irish woman and family.

Poetry by Taylor was included in UPU, a curation of Pacific Island writers’ work which was first presented at the Silo Theatre as part of the Auckland Arts Festival in March 2020. UPU was remounted as part of the Kia Mau Festival in Wellington in June 2021.

== Awards ==
Taylor received the Prime Minister's Award for Literary Achievement in 2024.

== Selected works ==
- 3 shades, poetry by Apirana Taylor, Lindsay Rabbitt, L.E. Scott; with an introduction by Alan Loney, Wellington: Voice Press, 1981
- Ki te ao: new stories, Penguin Books, 1990
- Whakapapa, audio CD selection of Taylor's poems published over the past 25 years plus a few, possibly new publications, read by Taylor, early-mid(?) 2001.
- Footprints in tears, thumbprints in blood, audio CD of mostly new poetry read and sung by Taylor to music, Apr.(?) 2004 (most of the poems are later included in Te ata kura = The red tipped dawn).
- Te ata kura = The red tipped dawn, Canterbury University Press, Nov. 2004
- A Canoe in Midstream, poetry, Canterbury University Press, 2009
- Five Strings, novel, Anahera Press, May 2017
