= Briar Grace-Smith =

New Zealand Māori scriptwriter

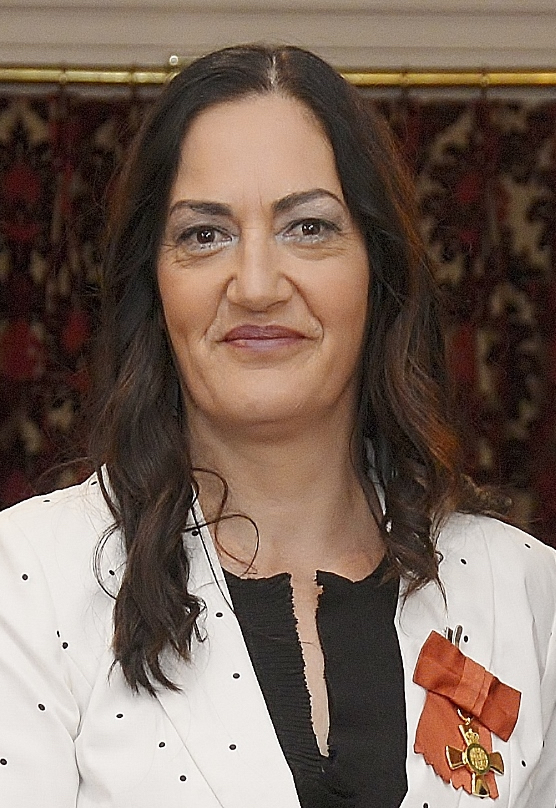
Grace-Smith in 2018

Briar Grace-Smith ONZM is a screenwriter, director, actor, and short story writer from New Zealand. She has worked as an actor and writer with the Māori theatre cooperative Te Ohu Whakaari and Māori theatre company He Ara Hou. Early plays Don't Call Me Bro and Flat Out Brown, were first performed at the Taki Rua Theatre in Wellington in 1996. Waitapu, a play written by Grace-Smith, was devised by He Ara Hou and performed by the group on the Native Earth Performing Arts tour in Canada in 1996.

== Works ==
Her first major play Nga Pou Wahine earned her the 1995 Bruce Mason Playwriting Award. Grace-Smith won Best New Zealand Play at the 1997 Chapman Tripp Theatre Awards for Purapurawhetu, called "a new classic of New Zealand theatre" by New Zealand Listener. The play also toured to Canada and Greece. Grace-Smith's plays Purapurawhetu and When Sun and Moon Collide were televised as two feature-length episodes in the six-part series Atamira. They aired on Māori TV on 6 May and 13 May 2012 respectively. Purapurawhetu starred Rawiri Paratene, Keisha Castle-Hughes, Rob Mokaraka, Scott Cotter, and Roimata Fox. When Sun and Moon Collide starred Calvin Tuteao, Xavier Horan, Kip Chapman, Maria Walker, Sophie Roberts, Ben Van Lier, and Anders Falstie-Jensen.

In 2000, she received the Arts Foundation Laureate Award. In 1993 she was Writer-in-Residence at Massey University, and in 2003, she was Writers' Fellow at Victoria University of Wellington. Her 2014 play Paniora was inspired by the story of Spanish influence in the East Coast, via Manuel José.

Screenplays include Fresh Meat (2012), Nine of Hearts and the New Zealand feature film The Strength of Water (2009). Her plays have toured in New Zealand and internationally. The Strength of Water was selected for the 2006 Sundance Screenwriters' Lab in Utah, and premiered at the Berlin and Rotterdam Film Festivals in 2009. She was a finalist at the 2009 Qantas Film and TV Awards for Best Screenplay for a Feature Film for The Strength of Water.

Grace-Smith's work for television includes drama Fishskin Suit, which won best drama at the NZ Television Awards and was nominated for Best Script – One off Drama. and Charlie The Dreaded, one of six Māori language stories produced for the Aroha series. Grace-Smith has also worked as a writer and storyliner on various television drama series. These have included Being Eve, and Kaitangata Twitch, a series adapted from the Margaret Mahy novel. She co-wrote Billy, a tele-feature about the life of comedian Billy T James, with Dave Armstrong (2011). Grace-Smith also served as a writer in the Three TV series Tangata Pai.

Grace-Smith is also a writer of short stories. Her short story Te Manawa appeared in The Six Pack, a sampler of New Zealand writing from New Zealand's inaugural Book Month publication (2006). Grace-Smith's short stories have been broadcast on Radio New Zealand National and appeared in anthologies including Penguin New Writers (1998), Tangata, Tangata (1999), Toi Wahine (1995), Huia Short Stories (1995) from Huia Publishers and Lost in Translation (2010).

Poetry by Grace-Smith was included in UPU, a curation of Pacific Island writers’ work which was first presented at the Silo Theatre as part of the Auckland Arts Festival in March 2020. UPU was remounted as part of the Kia Mau Festival in Wellington in June 2021.

== Films ==
Grace-Smith wrote and directed a 10-minute segment of the 2017 anthology film Waru (2017).

She co-directed the 2021 film Cousins (with Ainsley Gardiner), and directed the short films Nine of Hearts (2011) and Krystal (2019).

== Personal life ==
Grace-Smith is of Ngāpuhi and Ngāti Wai descent. She is the former daughter-in-law of Patricia Grace.

== Published ==
- 2012 Haruru Mai/Strange Resting Places: Playmarket, 160 pages, ISBN 978-0-908607-44-0
- 2007 When Sun and Moon Collide: Huia Publishers, 115 pages, ISBN 1-86969-316-7, ISBN 978-1-86969-316-9
- 1999 Purapurawhetu: Huia Publishers, 111 pages, ISBN 0-908975-78-3, ISBN 978-0-908975-78-5
- 1997 Nga Pou Wahine : Huia Publishers, 44 pages, Huia Publishers, ISBN 0-908975-26-0, ISBN 978-0-908975-26-6

== Screenplays ==
- 2012 Fresh Meat (feature film)
- 2012 When Sun and Moon Collide (television)
- 2012 Purapurawhetu (television)
- 2011 Billy (television, with Dave Armstrong)
- 2011 Nine of Hearts (short film)
- 2010 Kaitangata Twitch (television)
- 2010 Lily and Ra (short film)
- 2008 The Strength of Water (feature film)
- 2005 Mataku (television)
- 2002 Fishskin Suit (television)
- 2001 Being Eve (television)
- 1998–2000 The Big Chair (television)

List from Playmarket's Twenty New Zealand Playwrights

== Awards ==
- 2018 Appointed Officer of the New Zealand Order of Merit, for services to theatre, film and television, in the 2018 Queen's Birthday Honours
- 2010 Best Feature Film Script, New Zealand Writers Guild Awards The Strength of Water
- 2006 Sundance screenwriters laboratory, Utah The Strength of Water:
- 2003 Victoria University Writers' Fellow at Victoria University of Wellington
- 2001 Kapiti Writers' Award
- 2000 Arts Foundation of New Zealand Laureate Award
- 1998 Writer-in-Residence at Massey University
- 1997 Outstanding New New Zealand Play of the Year, Chapman Tripp Theatre Awards Purapurawhetu
- 1995 Best Short Play of the Year, Chapman Tripp Theatre Awards Nga Pou Wahine
- 1995 Bruce Mason Playwriting Award Nga Pou Wahine
