= Kurangaituku =

Supernatural part-woman part-bird in Māori mythology

Creature information
- Other names: Kurungaituku; Hine-ingoingo
- Folklore: Māori mythology

Origin
- Country: New Zealand
- Region: Bay of Plenty
- Details: Part-human, part-woman supernatural being

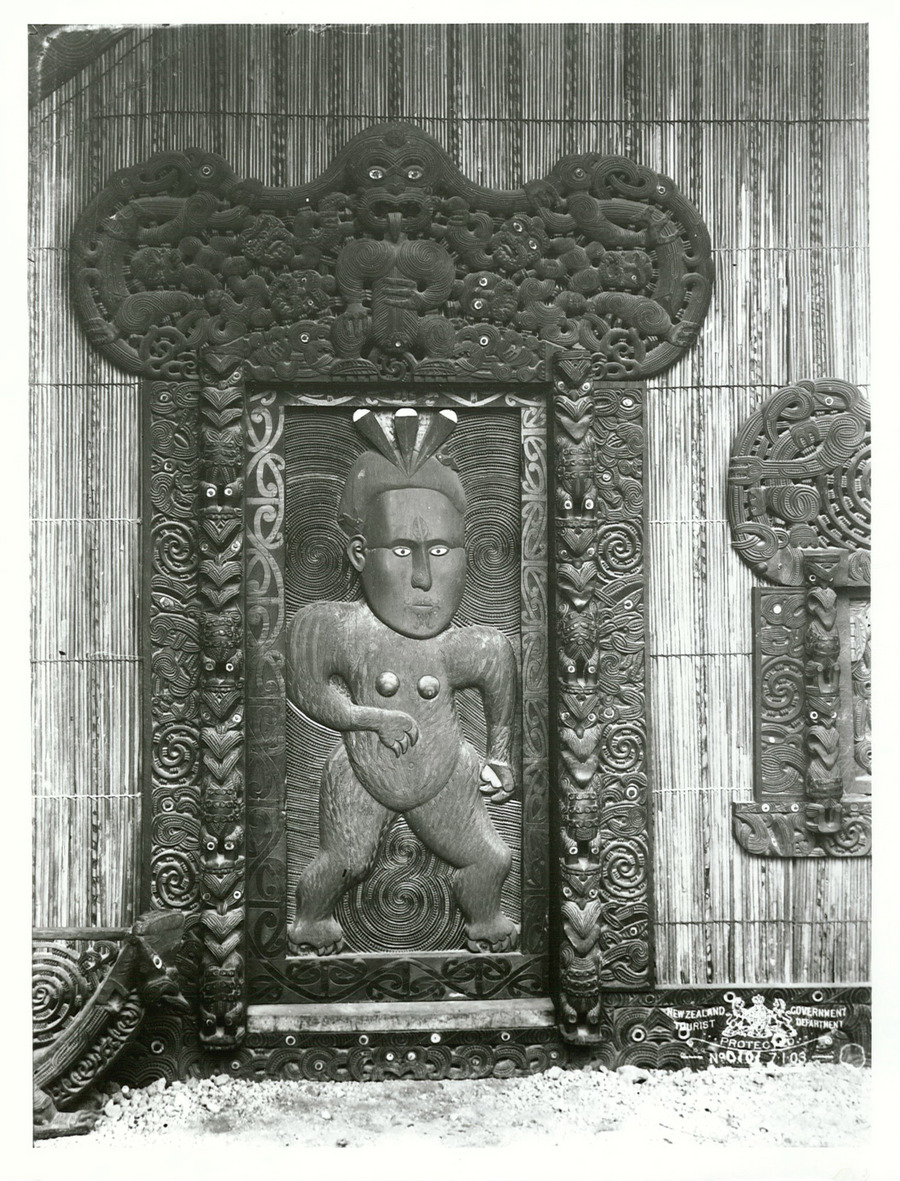
A carved depiction of Kurangaituku on the door of the house Rauru

Kurangaituku is a part-woman part-bird supernatural being in Māori mythology as told by the iwi (tribes) of Te Arawa and Raukawa. Her name is sometimes spelled Kurungaituku. She is sometimes described as an ogress or a witch, although some versions of the legend are sympathetic to her and present her as a nurturing caretaker of birds. She is said to have been betrayed and defeated by the young Te Arawa man Hatupatu.

A number of New Zealand places are associated with Kurangaituku and Hatupatu, including Te Kōhatu o Hatapatu, a rock that Hatupatu is said to have hid in while escaping from her. She is also the subject of whakairo (traditional carving) and other artworks, and the Kurangaituku Netball Tournament has been held annually in Rotorua since 1933. Whiti Hereaka's novel Kurangaituku (2021) retells the legend from Kurangaituku's perspective, and won the top fiction prize at the Ockham New Zealand Book Awards.

== Legend ==
=== Origins ===
The story of Kurangaituku is told in the oral traditions of the people of Te Arawa and Raukawa. Her name is sometimes translated as "Kura of the claws". In the telling by Te Arawa people, Kurangaituku is the antagonist to Hatupatu, the Te Arawa man who betrays and defeats her.

Other versions of the tale are more sympathetic to Kurangaituku, including versions told by the Raukawa people. Contemporary writers Ngahuia Te Awekotuku and Whiti Hereaka have both retold versions of the story from Kurangaituku's perspective. Te Awekotuku's tale focuses on Kurangaituku's creative and nurturing nature, including through providing her home as a refuge for birds and other creatures.

=== Capture of Hatupatu ===
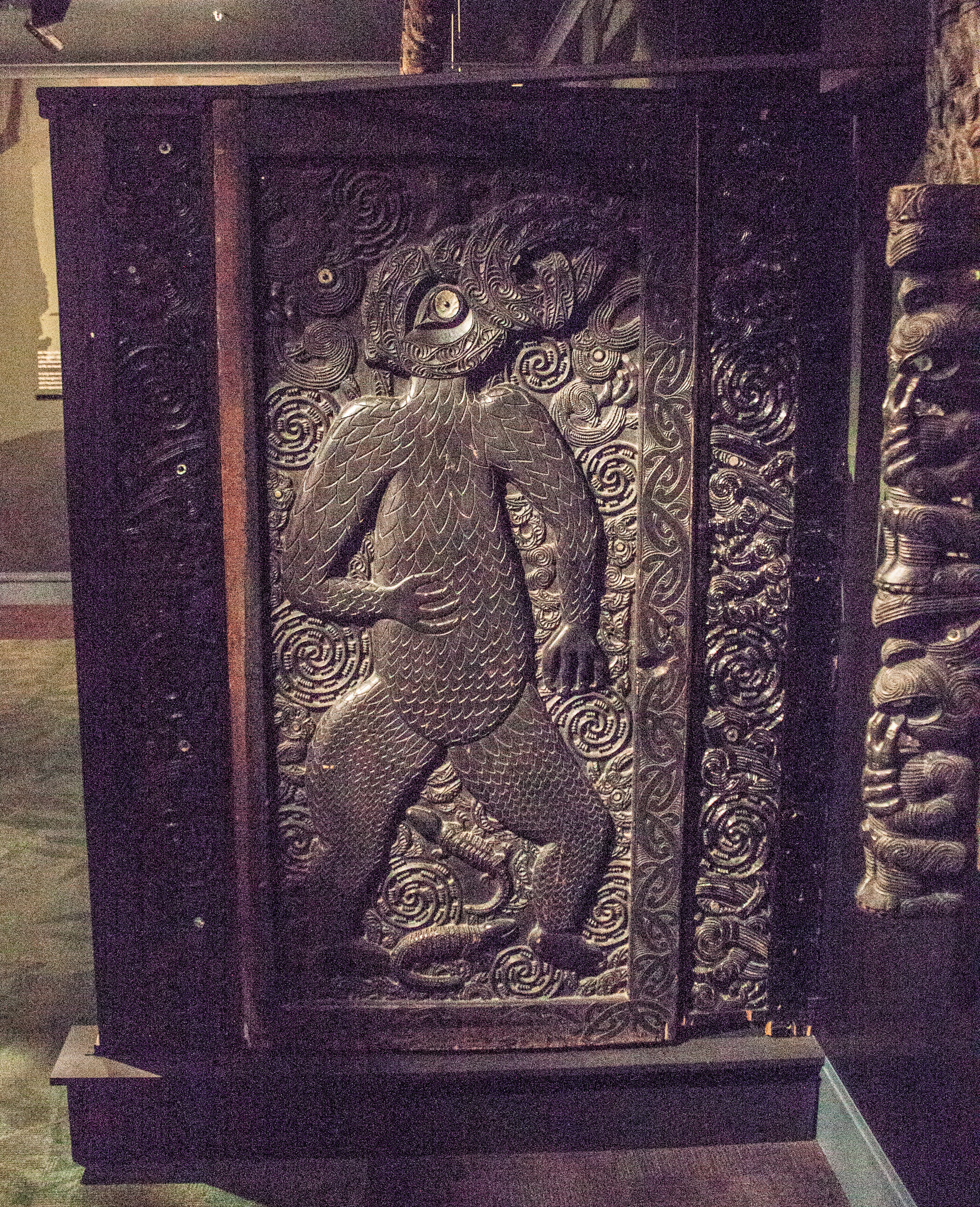
A carved depiction of Kurangaituku on the door of the meeting house Nuku-te-apiapi

Hatupatu was the youngest of a family of brothers said to have arrived in New Zealand on the ancestral waka (canoe) of Arawa, and who lived on Mokoia Island in the centre of Lake Rotorua.

In some versions of the tale, the young Hatupatu is hunting for birds in the forest when he encounters Kurangaituku, described as having wings on her arms, claws instead of fingers and a beak instead of a human mouth. She is sometimes described as an ogress or a witch. He runs away from her but is caught and taken to her cave, where he is imprisoned along with other pet birds and lizards. It is sometimes said that they lived together as husband and wife.

Nigel Te Hiko, a kaumātua and historian of the Raukawa people, considered that from a Raukawa perspective, Hatupatu was illegally hunting on Raukawa territory. The Raukawa version of the tale says that Kurangaituku found Hatupatu injured and nursed him back to health.

=== Betrayal ===
One day while Kurangaituku is out hunting, Hatupatu uses her taiaha (traditional weapon) to destroy her pet lizards and birds and steals her treasured korowai (feather cloaks). In a 1927 version told by Enid Tapsell in the Auckland Star, Hatupatu and Kurangaituku decide to live together but he then decides to kill her birds and escape after "wearying" of her. In a 1966 version published by Harry Dansey in bilingual magazine Te Ao Hou / The New World, Hatupatu was described as the slave of Kurangaituku who had intentionally killed her pet birds out of mischief. In 1855 Richard Taylor recorded another version of the legend in which Hatupatu does not kill her birds but seals up the house to prevent them from escaping.

One of the birds (which a number of versions of the tale describe as a riroriro) is able to escape and tell Kurangaituku, who returns and chases Hatupatu through the forest. He is able to hide in a rock through a magical opening at one point during the chase, by calling for the rock to let him in. When Hatupatu reaches Whakarewarewa, he is able to dodge around the boiling mud pools; Kurangaituku goes through them and is burned to death.

== Hine-ingoingo ==
Kurangaituku is also sometimes known as Hine-ingoingo. Elsdon Best, in Maori Religion and Mythology Part 2 (published posthumously in 1982), related a version of the tale he had collected in which Hatupatu meets Hine-ingoingo and does not realise she is a turehu (supernatural being). In this version they live together for a time but Hatupatu still decides to escape and destroys her pet reptiles and birds. In this story it is the miromiro bird that alerts Hine-ingoingo to his betrayal, and after Hatupatu hides in the rock Hine-ingoingo is able to call it open, after which she embraces him and is saddened by his unkind treatment of her. Best comments that Hatupatu "seems to have made but a poor return for the kindness displayed towards him by Hine-ingoingo, and he also appears to have left her to do all work in the collecting of food supplies."

== New Zealand places linked to Kurangaituku ==
Hatupatu and his family are said to have lived on Mokoia Island, an island located in Lake Rotorua. In 1925 James Cowan, a Pākehā writer, described a tōtara tree and a tawa tree on Mokoia Island which were both called "Te Parē-a-Hatupatu" (Hatupatu's head-wreath), both said to have grown from twigs in a wreath worn by Hatupatu.

Te Kōhatu o Hatapatu is a stone beside State Highway 1 at Ātiamuri, where Hatapatu is said to have hidden while hiding from Kurangaituku. George Grey recorded visiting the rock in his notebook in 1866. In 1935 it was referred to as Kurangaituku's Rock in an article in the Auckland Star. It is said that Kurangaituku's clawmarks are visible on the rock, and some people leave offerings such as sweets. In 1980 Hone Tuwhare translated a version of the legend from the Māori language, and his notes (held by the Alexander Turnbull Library) record that he and his family used to stop at this rock and leave coins. However, after Tūwhare's work translating the legend, they "don't stop there anymore"; Tūwhare's notes explain that he doesn't "think the bastard [Hataputu] was worth it". In 2017 work was undertaken by Waka Kotahi and other agencies to improve access to the rock and install informational placards. It was noted that the site was the only registered wāhi tapu (sacred place) in the south Waikato district. In late 2020 the rock was damaged by a vandal with a sledgehammer.

The pool of boiling mud into which Kurangaituku is said to have fallen at Whakarewarewa is called Whangapipiro.

== Artistic depictions ==
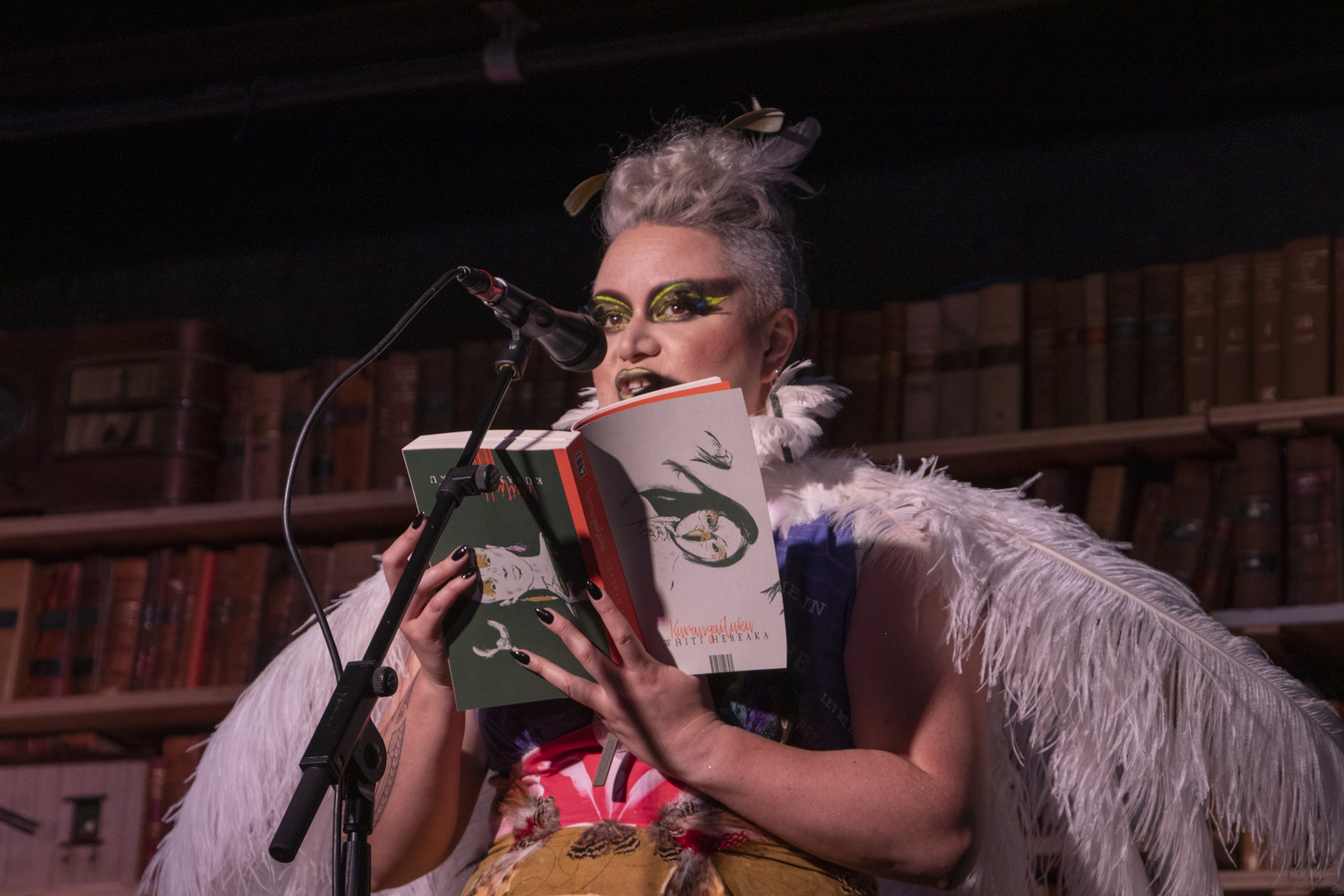
Whiti Hereaka reads from her book Kurangaituku at the book launch, held at Meow Bar in Wellington, Aotearoa New Zealand on 1 December 2021.

Kurangaituku is depicted in a number of New Zealand artworks. Master whakairo carver Tene Waitere carved panels of Hatupatu and Kurangaituku in 1904–5. In 1963 artist Fred O'Neill created a short film retelling the legend using Plasticine puppets. In 2000 Kurangaituku featured on the 80c stamp in a special New Zealand Post stamp issue themed around Māori myths and legends. A number of contemporary artist Lisa Reihana's works are inspired by Kurangaituku; for example in 2001 she made a photographic print representing Kurangaituku which is held by the Auckland Art Gallery. Weaver Donna Campbell created an outfit entitled "Kurungaituku Vixen" in 2008, which is held in the Puke Ariki collection.

Notably, she features in a number of public artworks around the city of Rotorua. Rotorua artists Glenys Courtney-Strachan and Maria Marshall have painted several murals featuring Kurangaituku, including for a kindergarten in 2017 and for the Rotorua Library in 2018. Since the 1990s Rotorua's Travel Centre has featured a mixed media collaborative artwork depicting Kurangaituku designed by Ata Armstrong and created by local women. In 2006 a whakairo carving of Kurangaituku by Clive Fugill was installed to welcome visitors at the entrance of the Māori Arts and Crafts Institute as part of a redevelopment of the institute.

The novel Kurangaituku by Whiti Hereaka, published in 2021 by Huia Publishers, is told from Kurangaituku's perspective and in a way reflecting Māori oral traditions. When Hereaka was growing up her family often stopped at Te Kōhatu o Hatapatu, the stone at Ātiamuri, on their way to Rotorua. In a review for The Pantograph Punch, Ariana Tikao notes that the structure "is much like Māori oratory – not linear, but existing in different times, cycles, and spaces all at once, then looping back on itself". The work won the top prize for fiction at the Ockham New Zealand Book Awards in 2022. Kurangaituku also features in Taniwha, Giants and Supernatural Creatures (2008), edited by Ross Calman, and in Ngahuia Te Awekotuku's retelling in Pūrākau: Māori myths retold by Māori writers (2019).

== Other cultural references ==
The Kurangaituku Netball Tournament has been an annual event in Rotorua since 1933 (originally a basketball tournament). The name originates from a 1 m (3 ft 3 in) tall trophy depicting Kurangaituku carved out of a tōtara tree by Pine Taiapa and used since the tournament began.

In 2015 the Rotorua Chamber of Pride, led by Tāmati Coffey, won "best float" at the Auckland Pride Parade for their float depicting Kurangaituku; a judge described it as "re-imagining her as a victim needing to be freed from her historical stigma".

Tangaroa (2021), the second album of the band Alien Weaponry, features a song called "Hatupatu" based on the legend. The band's drummer, Henry de Jong, noted that the story is "stepping out of colonial history and going more to the word of mouth folklore aspect of Māori history and culture". Wellington band DAHTM released their debut album titled Kurungaituku in 2021.

Kurangaituku featured as a character on the first episode of season 4 of the television show Wellington Paranormal, which aired on 16 February 2022.
