= Hatupatu =

New Zealand Māori rangatira (chief)

Hatupatu (or "Hatu Patu") was a Māori rangatira (chief) of the Te Arawa, who travelled from Hawaiki to New Zealand on the Arawa. Legend tells of his wily escape from the bird-woman Kurangaituku, by hiding inside a rock and then leading her into a boiling mud pool. Having grown into a man of ability and confidence, he led his people in battle against their enemy, chief Raumati, who had burned the Arawa canoe. Killing this powerful enemy, he gained great respect and mana, and set himself on the path to becoming one of the most famous of all Māori warriors. The parents of Hatupatu were Tamateahirau and Okarikiroa.

== Life ==
Hatupatu was the son of Karika and Tamatea-ahirau. He had had older brothers, including Hanui and Haroa. Hatupatu travelled from Hawaiki to New Zealand on the Arawa canoe. On arrival, he initially settled at Maketu with much of the rest of the crew. He participated in Tia's expedition to explore the interior, which visited Kaharoa, Lake Rotorua, the Waikato River, and Lake Taupō.

=== Hatupatu and Kurangaituku ===
After the former captain, Tama-te-kapua, left the community, Hanui, Haroa, and Hatupatu travelled to the area between Lake Rotorua, Lake Taupō, and the upper Waikato River in order to hunt birds. Hatupatu's brothers consistently teased and insulted him, so one day, while they were out hunting, he raided the storehouse, ate many of the preserved birds that they had caught, trampled the surrounding area, and then struck himself with his own spear, so that it would look as if the storehouse had been attacked and he had been overwhelmed. Initially, Hanui and Haroa believed him, but he repeated this several times and eventually they caught up, killed him, and buried him under the plucked feathers from the birds they had caught.

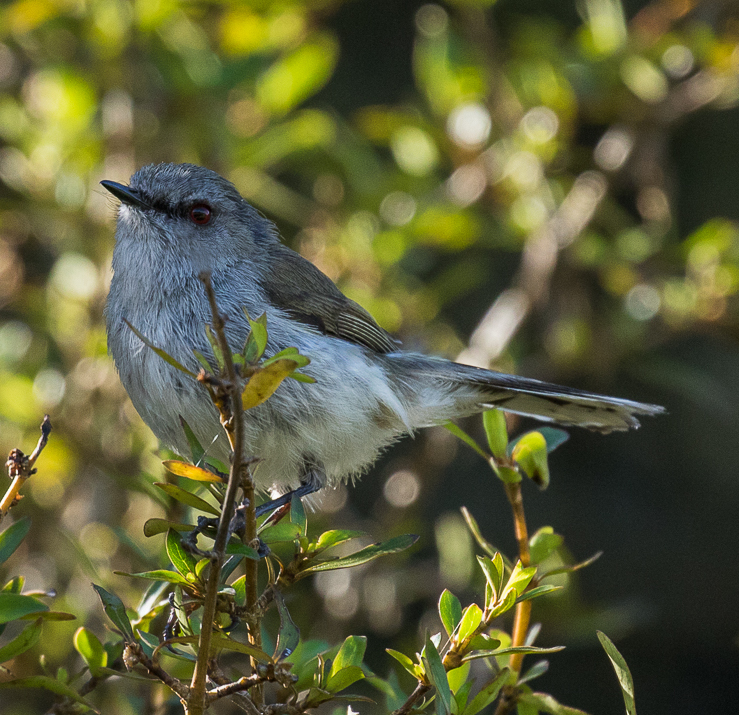
Riroriro.

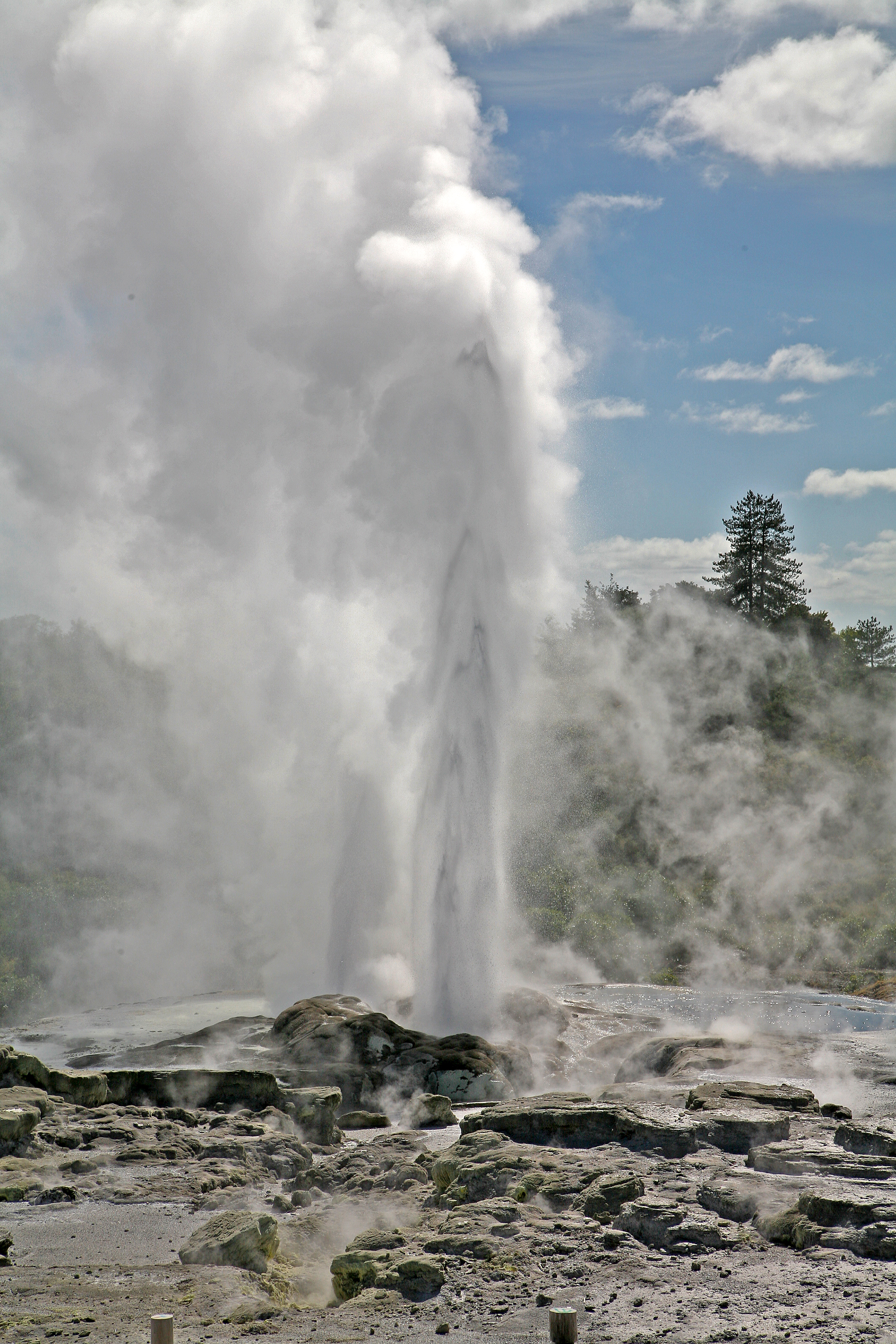
Pohutu geyser at Whakarewarewa.

When the brothers returned to Rotorua, their parents accused them of killing Hatupatu. They summoned a fly called Tamumu-ki-te-rangi, who found Hatupatu and brought him back to life with magic. On awakening, Hatupatu went hunting for birds and encountered a monstrous woman, Kurangaituku. She had long lips, which she used like spears to catch birds, had winged arms, and feathers all over her body. Hatupatu fled, but she caught him, took him back to her cave, which was full of treasure, and made him live as her husband. One day, Hatupatu decided to escape while she was out hunting. He killed her pet birds and lizards when they tried to warn her, so he killed them, but one bird, often said to be a riroriro, escaped and told her what had happened. She sang a special karakia (incantation) which allowed her to return to her cave in only three steps. As she approached, Hatupatu came to a large rock. He performed a karakia, which caused the rock to open up, so that he could hide inside. This rock, Te kōhatu o Hatupatu, is located next to State Highway 1, near Ātiamuri. Once she had passed by, Hatupatu continued his flight to Rotorua, but she began to pursue him again. In the Waipa River valley, Kurangaituku tried to catch him in her talons, but Hatupatu leapt behind another rock. The claw marks from her attack are still pointed out today. Finally, Hatupatu made it to Whakarewarewa, where Kurangaituku fell into a hot pool called Whanapipiro and died. Travellers passing by this pool traditionally chanted the phrase Mau e kai te manawa o tauhou to placate her spirit.

Hatupatu travelled on to Rotorua and swam across the lake to Mokoia Island in the night. There he encountered a servant of his parents at Hinemoa's Pool, who brought him to see his parents. He hid in the storehouse in order to spy on his brothers and heard them treating their mother poorly. Eventually, he appeared wearing all the toroa feathers and a Kākā-feather cloak which he had taken from Kurangaituku. They tried to kill him again, but he defeated them.

Huirama Te Hiko, a kaumātua and historian of the Raukawa people, considered that from a Raukawa perspective, Hatupatu was illegally hunting on Raukawa territory. The Raukawa version of the tale says that Kurangaituku found Hatupatu injured and nursed him back to health.

=== Avenging the Arawa ===
In the meanwhile, Raumati of Taranaki had burnt the Arawa canoe, either intentionally or accidentally. Hatupatu's father, tired of his sons arguing, called on them to get revenge. The sons were inspired. Hanui and Haroa began gathering foods for a war party, while Hatupatu learnt the tattoos of Raumati from his father, so that he would be able to recognise him. Hanui and Haroa set out in canoes, but Hatupatu gathered thirty kākā cloaks and swam with them to Mourea, getting to Ngaukawakawa ahead of his brothers. He threw the garland of leaves that he was wearing on his head to the ground and they grew into a pōhutukawa tree. He swam on to Kuharua, which he again reached ahead of his brothers. Again, he threw leaves to the ground, but this time they became a tōtara tree.

Finally, the war party came to Otaramarae, from which they marched to Te Hoe a Taunga. The next day, they reached Maketu, where they divided the men between the commanders. Hanui and Haroa refused to give any of the troops to Hatupatu. He complained, but they did not relent, so he made model soldiers out of bushes and vines and dressed them in the cloaks that he had brought with him. Hatupatu appeared before these model soldiers repeatedly in different outfits, delivering speeches of exhortation. Raumati and his troops, who had now approached, thought that they were seeing several different chiefs and were frightened. In the battle, Hanui's soldiers attacked first, but were driven back twice. Finally, Hatupatu attacked, killed a chief named Karika, and chopped off his head with his whalebone mere. Raumati's men fled in horror. D. M. Stafford says that Hatupatu found Raumati at the bottom of a cliff and performed the spell "Tipi a Houmea", which caused a rock slide that crushed Raumati. George Graham says that Hatupatu captured Raumati and was about to kill him with his mere, but Raumati presented him with his own mere, Te Kaoreore, insisting that this should be used to kill him.

When the brothers returned to Mokoia, their father called out to ask which of them had killed Raumati. The brothers held up heads they had collected, but none of these were the head of Raumati. Finally, Hatupatu revealed that he had the head. This achievement solidified his standing above that of his brothers. Raumati's head was kept at Mokoia as a mokaikai (treasure) for generations.

=== Aquaculture and agriculture ===
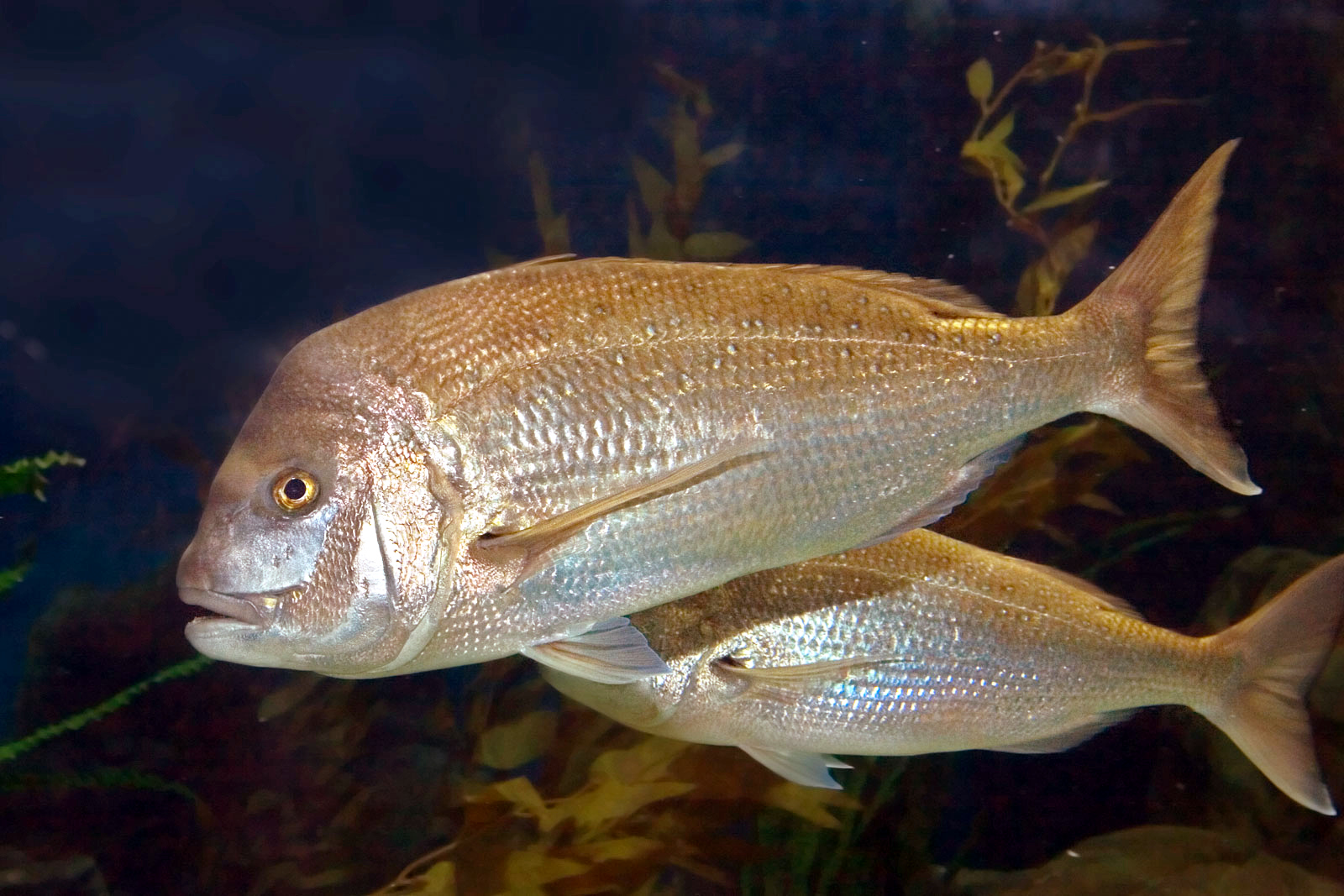
Tāmure (snapper).

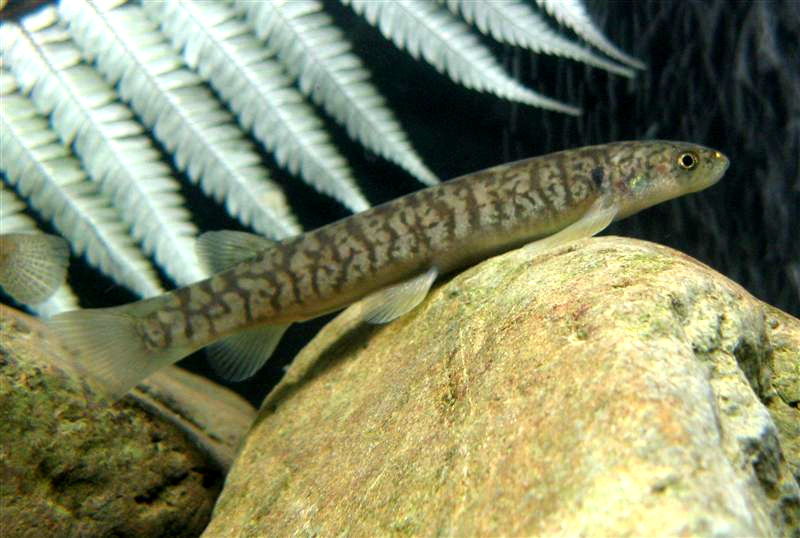
Kōaro (climbing galaxias).

Hatupatu decided to introduce eels to Lake Rotorua. He sent slaves to Tokoroa, where they captured eels in Pukerimu and Oraka streams and brought them back. A tohunga at Ohinemutu told Hatupatu to perform a special ritual before releasing the eels. He burnt fern leaves on the shore of the lake and had the eels slither over the ashes and into the lake. The eels were burnt and they all died; the tohunga ate them. Hatupatu killed the tohunga in anger.

Hatupatu also attempted to introduce tāmure (snapper) to Rotorua. A group of his slaves set out from Maketu to Rotorua with a huge bucket made out of totara bark, containing seventy fish. He placed a series of slaves all the way along the route, each with a calabash of salt water, so that the salt water could be changed frequently. By the time they had reached the lake, only one fish was still alive; they threw it into the water and it swam around Mokoia Island with its tail out of the water, returned to where it had been released and dropped dead.

Finally, Hatupatu introduced kōaro (climbing galaxias) to the lake from Rotoaira, near Taupō. These thrived in Rotorua and Rotoiti until the 1860s.

On Mokoia Island, Hatupatu planted a tōtara tree from a cutting that he had taken at Kawerau, a tawa tree, and a pūriri from a cutting that he had taken from Katikati.

== Family ==
Hatupatu had a daughter:

- Tuparewhaitaita, who married Tawake-moe-tahanga, son of Kahumatamomoe (who was himself son of Tama-te-kapua, the captain of the Arawa). They had a son:

- Uenuku-mai-Rarotonga who married Whakaotirangi (not the same Whakaotirangi who came to New Zealand on the Arawa or Tainui canoes).

- Rangitihi

- Kawatapu-a-rangi

- Pikiao, ancestor of Ngāti Pikiao, Ngāti Mahuta, and Ngāti Pāoa.

== In popular culture ==
A book by New Zealand author Whiti Hereaka about this legend from the point of view of the bird-women called Kurangaituku (Huia Publishers 2021) won the top prize for fiction at the 2022 Ockham New Zealand Book Awards.

The legend was the subject of a song by the same name performed by metal band Alien Weaponry in their 2021 album Tangaroa.

== Bibliography ==
- Cowan, James (1925). "Chapter XI: The Story of Hatupatu and Kura-of-the-Claws". Fairy Folk Tales of the Maori. Auckland: Whitcombe and Tombs Limited.
- Graham, George (1943). "Te Kaoreore". Journal of the Polynesian Society. 52: 46–53.
- Stafford, Don (1967). Te Arawa: A History of the Arawa People. Reed. ISBN 9780947506100.
- Te Hiko, Huirama (June 2017). "Kurungaituku, Guardian of the Forest" (PDF). Raukawa Settlement Trust.
