= Raupatu =

Raupatu is a Māori language word meaning "confiscation". It may refer to:

- Land confiscated by the New Zealand Government during the New Zealand Wars
- The Waikato Raupatu Claims Settlement Act 1995
- "Raupatu" (song), 2017 single by Alien Weaponry
