= Tū (album) =

2018 studio album by Alien Weaponry

Studio album by Alien Weaponry
- Released: 1 June 2018
- Genres: Groove metal, thrash metal, alternative metal, nu metal
- Length: 55:41
- Languages: English, Māori
- Label: Napalm
- Producers: Simon Gooding, Hammerhead, Tom Larkin

Alien Weaponry chronology
The Zego Sessions (2014)	Tū (2018)	Tangaroa (2021)

Singles from Tū
- 1. "Urutaa" Released: 21 November 2016; 2. "Raupatu" Released: 31 January 2017; 3. "Rū Ana Te Whenua" Released: 1 July 2017; 4. "Holding My Breath" Released: 16 March 2018; 5. "Kai Tangata" Released: 11 May 2018

Professional ratings
Review scores
Source	Rating
Metal.de	8/10
Distorted Sound Magazine	7/10
Metal Forces Magazine	9/10
Metal Hammer Germany	5/7
Punknews.org	3.5/5

Tū (Māori for Stop) is the debut studio album by New Zealand metal band Alien Weaponry, released on 1 June 2018 by Napalm Records.

== Cover artwork ==
The album's cover artwork was designed by New Zealand designer Barny Bewick. The figure, who the band nicknamed Tū, represents the Māori, Celtic, French and Scandinavian heritage of the bandmembers.

== Track listing ==
All tracks are written by Henry De Jong, Lewis De Jong and Ethan Trembath.

Tū track listing
No.	Title	Length
1.	"Whaikōrero"	1:36
2.	"Rū Ana Te Whenua"	5:33
3.	"Holding My Breath"	4:35
4.	"Raupatu"	3:39
5.	"Kai Tangata"	6:37
6.	"Rage - It Takes Over Again"	3:39
7.	"The Things That You Know"	4:58
8.	"Whispers"	4:17
9.	"PC Bro"	3:46
10.	"Urutaa"	4:12
11.	"Nobody Here"	3:05
12.	"Te Ara"	4:42
13.	"Hypocrite"	5:02
Total length:		55:41

== Personnel ==
Credits adapted from the album's booklet.

Alien Weaponry

- Lewis De Jong – guitars, lead vocals, kōauau
- Henry De Jong – drums, backing vocals, pūtātara
- Ethan Trembath – bass, backing vocals, pūrerehua

Production

- Alien Weaponry – songwriting
- Simon Gooding – producer (3, 5–8, 11–12), recording (3, 5–8, 11–12)
- Hammerhead – producer (3, 5–9, 11–12)
- Paddy Hill – recording (4, 10)
- Tom Larkin – producer (1–2, 4, 9–10, 13), recording (1)
- Hugh Porter – recording (3, 5–8, 11–12)
- Scott Seabright – recording (2, 4, 9–10, 13)
- Samuel K Sproull – mastering

== Charts ==
Chart performance for Tū
Charts (2018)	Peak position
New Zealand Albums (RMNZ)	5
New Zealand Artist Albums (RMNZ)	1
U.S. Billboard Top Heatseekers	25

=== Year-end charts ===
Chart (2018)	Position
New Zealand Artist Albums (RMNZ)	16
