= Whiti Hereaka =

New Zealand writer (born 1978)

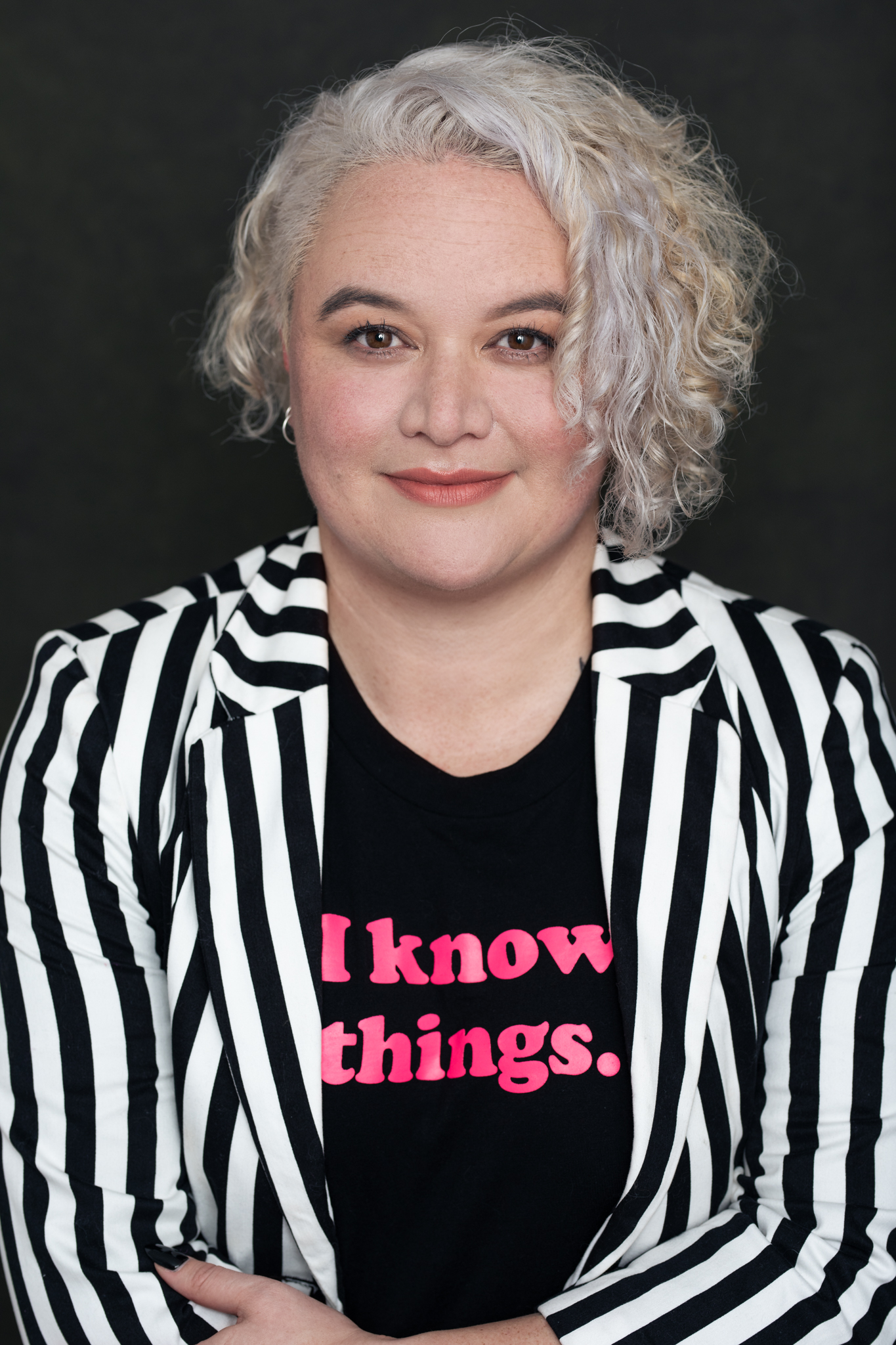
- Whiti Hereaka (2021)
- Born: 1978 (age 47–48); Taupō
- Citizenship: New Zealand
- Occupation: Writer

Whiti Hereaka (born 1978) is a New Zealand playwright, novelist and screenwriter and a barrister and solicitor. She has held a number of writing residencies and appeared at literary festivals in New Zealand and overseas, and several of her books and plays have been shortlisted for or won awards. In 2022 her book Kurangaituku won the prize for fiction at the Ockham New Zealand Book Awards and Bugs won an Honour Award in the 2014 New Zealand Post Awards for Children and Young Adults. She lives in Wellington, New Zealand.

== Biography ==
Whiti Hereaka was born in 1978 and grew up in Taupō. Hereaka is of Ngāti Tūwharetoa, Te Arawa and Pākehā descent. Her favourite childhood reading included books by Roald Dahl, the Narnia series, Anne of Green Gables, Tanglewood Tales and The Moomins.

She is a barrister and solicitor and holds a Masters in Creative Writing (Scriptwriting) from the International Institute of Modern Letters at Victoria University of Wellington. In 2022, she was appointed as a permanent, fulltime lecturer in the creative writing programme at Te Kunenga ki Pūrehuroa / Massey University.

Hereaka has written many plays for stage and radio as well as several novels, and has held a number of writing residencies, including writer in residence at Randell Cottage in Wellington in 2007, the Summer residency at the Michael King Writers Centre in 2012, writer in residence at the International Writers Program in Iowa City in 2013 and the Māori Writer’s Residency at the Michael King Writers Centre in 2017.

She has been invited to appear at several festivals including the Auckland Writers Festival, the Taipei International Book Exhibition in Taiwan and the Singapore Writers Festival (all in 2015) and the WORD Christchurch Festival in 2018.

In 2012 she was selected for Te Papa Tupu, a writers’ programme supported by the Māori Literature Trust, Huia Publishers, Creative New Zealand and Te Puni Kōkiri and she has since been a mentor and judge for the same programme.

Her book Legacy from 2018 is a timeslip novel about a Māori teenager who travels back in time to World War I and finds himself serving as his great-great grandfather, Te Ariki, in the Māori Contingent.

She is a trustee of the Māori Literature Trust, and lives in Wellington, New Zealand.

== Awards and prizes ==
The Graphologist’s Apprentice was shortlisted for Best First Book in the Commonwealth Writers Prize (Asia/Pacific region) 2011.

Whiti Hereaka won the 2012 Bruce Mason Playwriting Award. Her other playwriting awards include Best Play by a Māori Playwright in the Adam NZ Play Awards for Te Kaupoi (2010) and Rona and Rabbit on the Moon (2011). Her plays have been called "poetic, poignant, and wildly imaginative".

Bugs was a Young Adult Fiction finalist in the 2014 New Zealand Post Book Awards for Children and Young Adults and won an Honour Award. Bugs was also named as a Storylines Notable Book and was a finalist in the 2014 LIANZA Awards.

Legacy won the Young Adult Fiction award in the 2019 New Zealand Book Awards for Children and Young Adults. In 2021 she was awarded the NZSA Peter and Dianne Beatson Fellowship.

Hereaka's book Kurangaituku won the NZ$60,000 Jann Medlicott Acorn prize for fiction at the 2022 Ockham New Zealand Book Awards. This book is about the Te Awara Māori legend of Hatupatu from the point of view of the bird-woman Kurangaituku. The awards convener Rob Kidd said of the book that it was “intense, clever and sexy as hell. It’s also an important novel. A game changer.” In 2023, the book was longlisted for the Dublin Literary Award.

== Bibliography ==
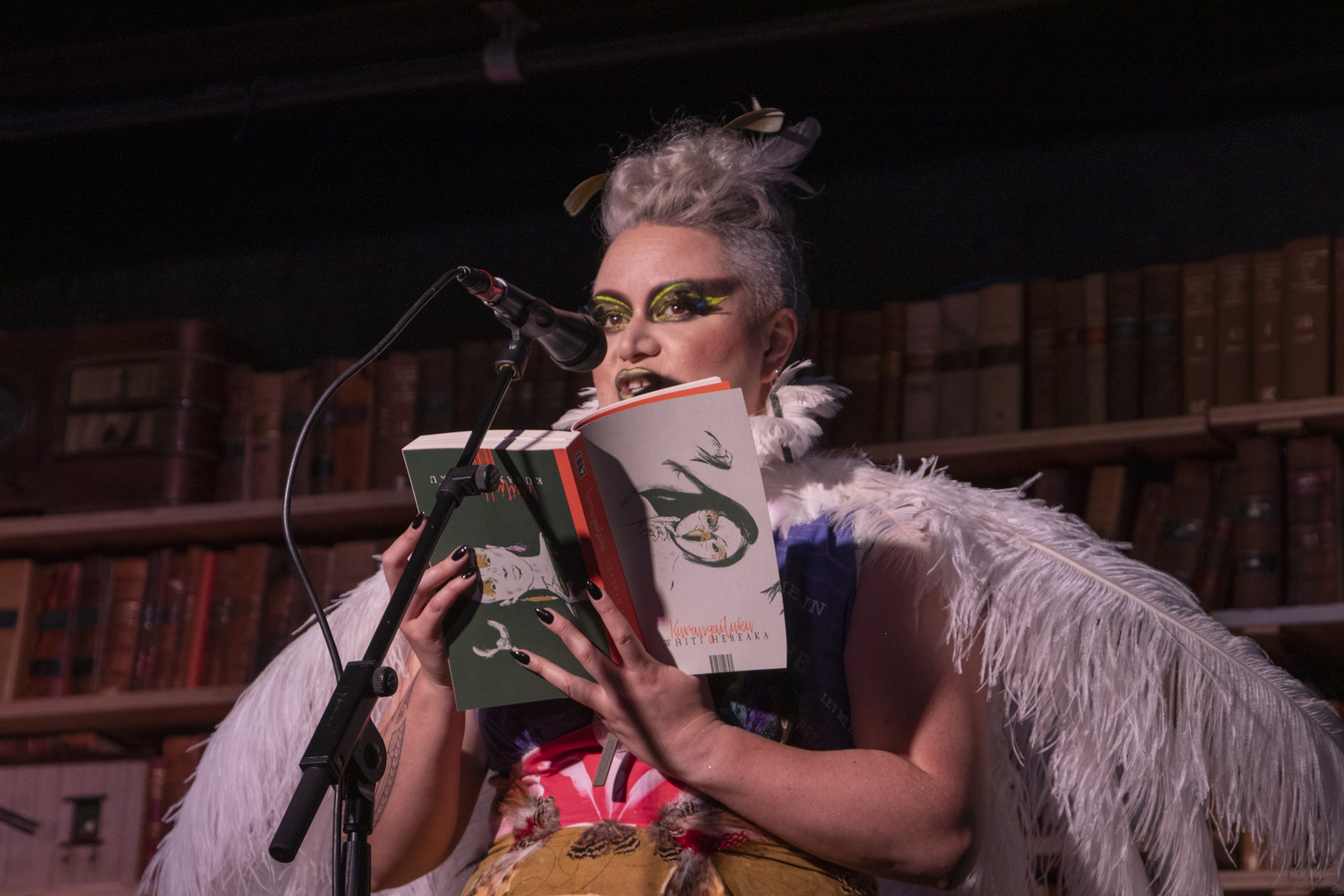
Whiti Hereaka does a reading at the launch of her book Kurangaituku at Meow Bar in Wellington, Aotearoa New Zealand on 1 December 2021

=== Novels ===
- The Graphologist's Apprentice (Huia, 2010)
- Bugs (Huia, 2013)
- Legacy (Huia, 2018)
- Pūrākau (2019) anthology of Māori myths (co-editor with Witi Ihimaera)
- Kurangaituku (Huia, 2021)

=== Plays ===
- Ohrwurm
- Fallow (Tawata Productions, 2005)
- Collective Agreement (Young and Hungry, 2005)
- I Ain't Nothing But/A Glimmer in the Dark She Said (Open Book Productions for STAB 2006)
- Te Kaupoi (Bush Collective, 2010)
- For Johnny (Young and Hungry, 2011)
- Rona and Rabbit on the Moon (Winner, Best New Play by a Māori Playwright, Adam Play Awards 2011)
- Raw Men (shortlisted for the Adam New Play award 2012)
- Rewena (Centrepoint Theatre, 2013)
