= Te Rā =

2025 studio album by Alien Weaponry

Studio album by Alien Weaponry
- Released: 28 March 2025
- Length: 42:04
- Languages: English, Māori
- Label: Napalm
- Producer: Josh Wilbur

Alien Weaponry chronology
Tangaroa (2021)	Te Rā (2025)

Singles from Te Rā
- 1. "Mau Moko" Released: 15 January 2025; 2. "1000 Friends" Released: 19 February 2025; 3. "Taniwha" Released: 26 March 2025

Te Rā (Māori for The Sun) is the third studio album by New Zealand metal band Alien Weaponry. The album was released on 28 March 2025 by Napalm Records. As with their previous two albums, the album features tracks sung both in English and in Māori and incorporates elements of Māori music.

== Background and promotion ==
On 15 January 2025, Alien Weaponry announced that they would release their third studio album, Te Rā, on 28 March 2025 via Napalm Records as well as the album's first single entitled "Mau Moko". On 19 February, the band released the second single, entitled "1000 Friends". On 26 March 2025, Alien Weaponry released the third single "Taniwha", featuring Randy Blythe of Lamb of God.

== Track listing ==
Te Rā track listing
No.	Title	Length
1.	"Crown"	3:23
2.	"Mau Moko"	3:45
3.	"1000 Friends"	3:21
4.	"Hanging by a Thread"	3:37
5.	"Tama-nui-te-rā"	4:40
6.	"Myself to Blame"	4:17
7.	"Taniwha" (featuring Randy Blythe of Lamb of God)	4:48
8.	"Blackened Sky"	3:05
9.	"Te Riri o Tāwhirimātea"	4:47
10.	"Ponaturi"	4:11
11.	"Te Kore"	2:06
Total length:		42:04

== Personnel ==
Alien Weaponry

- Lewis Raharuhi de Jong – guitars, lead vocals
- Henry Te Reiwhati de Jong – drums, backing vocals
- Tūranga Morgan-Edmonds – bass

Additional musicians

- Randy Blythe – guest vocals (on "Taniwha")

Production

- Josh Wilbur – production, mixing, mastering, engineering
- Kyle McAuley – engineering
- Steve Ornest – engineering

Artwork

- Alan Ashcraft – artwork

== Charts ==
Chart performance for Te Rā
Chart (2025)	Peak position
New Zealand Albums (RMNZ)	30
New Zealand Aotearoa Albums (RMNZ)	4
UK Album Downloads (OCC)	40
