= Toroa =

Toroa can refer to:

- Northern royal albatross
- Southern royal albatross
- Toroa (ferry), an Auckland, New Zealand, passenger ferry
- Toroa (leafhopper), a leafhopper genus in the tribe Erythroneurini
- Toroa (Mātaatua), captain of the Mātaatua waka
- Toroa (sculpture), a 1989 sculpture by Peter Nicholls in Dunedin, New Zealand
