= Raupatu (song) =

2017 single by Alien Weaponry

Single by Alien Weaponry

from the album Tū
- Language: Māori
- Released: 31 January 2017
- Studio: Roundhead Studios, Auckland
- Genre: Thrash metal
- Length: 3:37
- Songwriters: Ethan Trembath, Henry De Jong, Lewis De Jong
- Producer: Tom Larkin

Alien Weaponry singles chronology
"Urutaa" (2016)	"Raupatu" (2017)	"Rū Ana Te Whenua" (2017)

Music video
- "Raupatu" on YouTube

"Raupatu" (English: "Confiscated") is a Māori language song by New Zealand thrash metal band Alien Weaponry. Released as a single in early 2017, it won the Maioha Award at the 2017 APRA Silver Scroll Awards.

== Background and composition ==
The song, along with many of the band's early releases, are based on discussions the de Jong brothers had with their father, as he discussed their whakapapa during car journeys. The song discusses the New Zealand land confiscations of the 1800s in the Waikato, Bay of Plenty and Taranaki regions, the chiefs who resisted these confiscations, and tino rangatiratanga, kāwanatanga and sovereignty. The song features an excerpt from Te Tiriti o Waitangi, the Māori language version of the 1840 Treaty of Waitangi, which discusses sovereignty in different terms to how it is expressed in the English language document.

The song was produced by Tom Larkin of the New Zealand band Shihad, and was recorded at Roundhead Studios in Auckland, New Zealand

== Release ==
The song was first released on the band's BandCamp store on 31 January 2017, with the song's music video being released a day later. The song had a wider release across most digital platforms on 6 February, to coincide with Waitangi Day.

== Reception ==
"Raupatu" had a strong response online, and was one of the reasons the band was noticed internationally. The song won the Maioha Award at the 2017 APRA Silver Scroll Awards, celebrating music released in Te Reo Māori. During the ceremony, the song was covered by taonga pūoro musicians Ariana Tikao, James Webster, Alistair Fraser, and Horomona Horo.

== Tracklist ==
- Digital download
1. "Raupatu" – 3:37
2. "PC Bro" – 3:46

== Credits and personnel ==
Credits adapted from the Tū album booklet.

Alien Weaponry

- Henry De Jong – drums, backing vocals
- Lewis De Jong – guitars, lead vocals
- Ethan Trembath – bass, backing vocals

Production

- Tom Larkin – production
- Alien Weaponry – songwriting
- Paddy Hill – recording
- Scott Seabright – recording
