= Tangaroa (album) =

Studio album by Alien Weaponry
- Released: 17 September 2021
- Genres: Groove metal, thrash metal, alternative metal
- Length: 65:19
- Languages: English, Māori
- Label: Napalm

Alien Weaponry chronology
Tū (2018)	Tangaroa (2021)	Te Rā (2025)

Singles from Tangaroa
- 1. "Ahi Kā" Released: 2 May 2019; 2. "Blinded" Released: 12 July 2019; 3. "Tangaroa" Released: 16 June 2021; 4. "Buried Underground" Released: 5 August 2021; 5. "Hatupatu" Released: 17 September 2021

Tangaroa (the Māori god of the sea) is the second studio album by New Zealand metal band Alien Weaponry, released on 17 September 2021 by Napalm Records. The album is the last to feature bassist Ethan Trembath and the first with Trembath's replacement, Tūranga Morgan-Edmonds.

As with their debut, the album features tracks sung both in English and in Māori and incorporates elements of Māori music, including the usage of taonga pūoro such as the pūtātara.

Following the album's release, the band supported Gojira on their American tour, alongside fellow support act Knocked Loose.

== Lyrical themes ==
The first single to be released was "Ahi Kā", which talks about how the Auckland City Council removed Ngāti Whātua people from their homes in Ōkahu Bay and then proceeded to burn the houses down in order to beautify the city in preparation for a visit by Queen Elizabeth II in the early 1950s. It was included on Adult Swim's Metal Swim 2 compilation and premiered on Billboard's website on 2 May 2019, later receiving a video.

The second single, also released in 2019, was "Blinded", a song that had originally been released as a B-side of "Ahi Kā". Frontman Lewis de Jong said that the song has a "very personal meaning" for him, but that the band wanted the video to "leave things more open, so people can interpret it their own way".

The third single was the title track, released on the day of the album's announcement, which discusses the pollution of the oceans by plastic materials. It received a video shot almost entirely underwater and aims at supporting the Sea Shepherd Conservation Society.

The fourth single and video was "Buried Underground", which received a video alternating images of the band live or in front of animated graphics with images recorded by fans in which they appear dancing a stomping-like choreography to match the song. Its lyrics discuss the effects of drug abuse.

On the day of the album's release the fifth single and video was also released, "Hatupatu", which tells the tale of the homonymous Māori mythological figure.

Other tracks deal with New Zealand and Māori history, such as "Titokowaru", which tells the tale of Ngāti Ruanui chief Tītokowaru, and his military victories over British colonisers. There are also songs about personal battles, such as "Unforgiving" (about self-loathing and insecurity) and "Dad" (about parent absenteeism).

== Critical reception ==
Professional ratings
Review scores
Source	Rating
RAMzine	4/5 stars
Metal.de	5/10
Metal Hammer	4/5 stars
Kerrang!	3/5
Blabbermouth.net	8/10
Tuonela Magazine	Favorable

Jay Brown from RAMzine compared the band's usage of native elements with early Soulfly and the album's modern sound with Gojira's Fortitude. He concluded saying that "as the band have matured, their music has too, [...] this isn't a run of the mill, appeal to everyone record and neither is Alien Weaponry, this is a band with a purpose and this album was made to serve that purpose and it does so extremely well."

Metal Hammer's Elliot Leaver called Tangaroa "the natural successor to Tū". He considered it "a more mature release that sees Alien Weaponry both consolidate their sound and progress as an outfit" and that with the album, the band proves "they're not a flash in the pan; Alien Weaponry have come of age."

Angela Davey, on her review for Kerrang!, said that "there's a freshness that keeps every song interesting" and reflected that now they join "the likes of Gojira and Cattle Decapitation in their fight to save the planet", finishing her review with "they are unlike any other band and it's this uniqueness that makes them truly great."

Writing for Blabbermouth.net, Dom Lawson considered Tangaroa "a much stronger record than its predecessor. [...] this is a record that crackles with enhanced urgency, as if ALIEN WEAPONRY are militant and myopic in the pursuit of their musical dreams, and its finest moments seem to confirm that the Kiwis are well-equipped for the long haul." He ultimately called it "a brave, invigorating and frequently surprising record", hailing the trio as "promising young upstarts" who "sound rather more like battle-hardened diehards with a point to prove and the conviction, and songs, to back it up."

Tuonela Magazine's editor-in-chief Laureline Tilkin noted some progressive elements in the band's instrumentation and called Tangaroa "a versatile album combining elements from ALIEN WEAPONRY's first album with a more progressive edge. This mix of new elements into the sound makes their songs more mature and very layered. [...] This album breathes an organic nature, is incredibly raw, but somehow it still sounds big and epic, while not using any of the gimmicks that are in fashion right now." She ultimately considered it a contender for album of the year.

In a mixed review for Metal.de, Tim Otterbeck also noted more progressive elements, but saw them as a problem because "the progressive insertions sometimes drag the songs out too artificially, but without creating the necessary tension over long stretches." He also criticized De Jong's singing for lacking "pressure"; the drums' mixing for making them sound "thin" and said the album lacks "real bangers" and that many songs "take a long time to even begin and then they just stumble irrelevantly towards the end."

== Track listing ==
Tangaroa track listing
No.	Title	Length
1.	"Titokowaru"	5:51
2.	"Hatupatu"	5:31
3.	"Ahi Kā"	3:45
4.	"Tangaroa"	5:42
5.	"Unforgiving"	7:10
6.	"Blinded"	5:37
7.	"Kai Whatu"	5:16
8.	"Crooked Monsters"	4:23
9.	"Buried Underground"	3:56
10.	"Dad"	4:51
11.	"Īhenga"	5:18
12.	"Down the Rabbit Hole"	5:04
Total length:		65:19

Bonus tracks
No.	Title	Length
13.	"Tangaroa" (radio edit)	4:48
14.	"Buried Underground" (radio edit)	3:36
15.	"Hatupatu" (radio edit)	4:46
16.	"Titokowaru" (radio edit)	4:14
17.	"Ihenga" (radio edit)	3:16
Total length:		85:59

== Charts ==
Chart performance for Tangaroa
Chart (2021)	Peak position
New Zealand Albums (RMNZ)	19
New Zealand Aotearoa Albums (RMNZ)	4
UK Album Downloads (OCC)	61
UK Independent Albums (OCC)	41
UK Rock & Metal Albums (OCC)	19

== Personnel ==
- Lewis Raharuhi de Jong – lead guitar, lead vocals, original drawing of cover art
- Ethan Trembath – bass, backing vocals, lead vocals on "Dad"
- Henry te Reiwhati de Jong – drums, backing vocals
- Tūranga Porowini Morgan-Edmonds – rhythm guitar, bass (credited, but does not perform), backing vocals on "Unforgiving"
