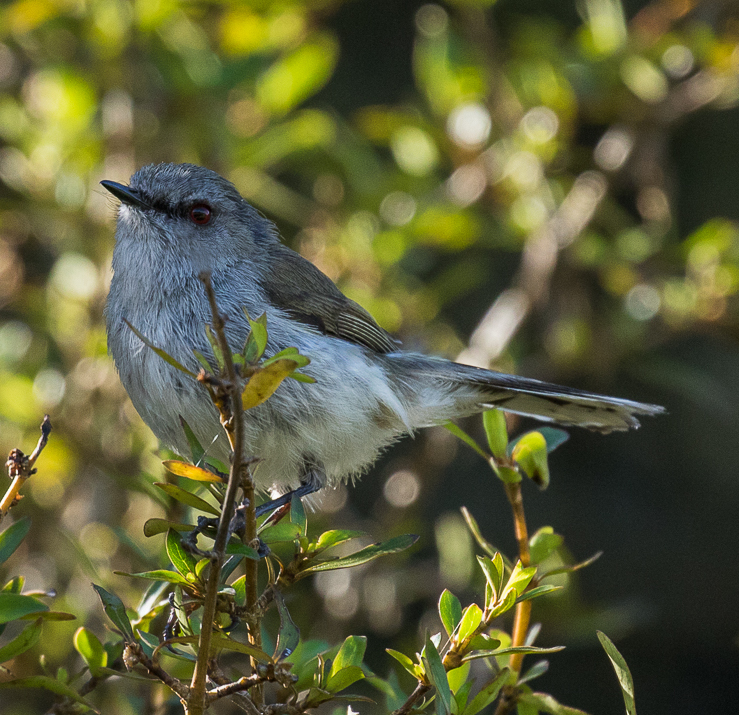

Conservation status
- Least Concern (IUCN 3.1)

Scientific classification
- Kingdom: Animalia
- Phylum: Chordata
- Class: Aves
- Order: Passeriformes
- Family: Acanthizidae
- Genus: Gerygone
- Species: G. igata

Binomial name
- Gerygone igata (Quoy & Gaimard, 1832)
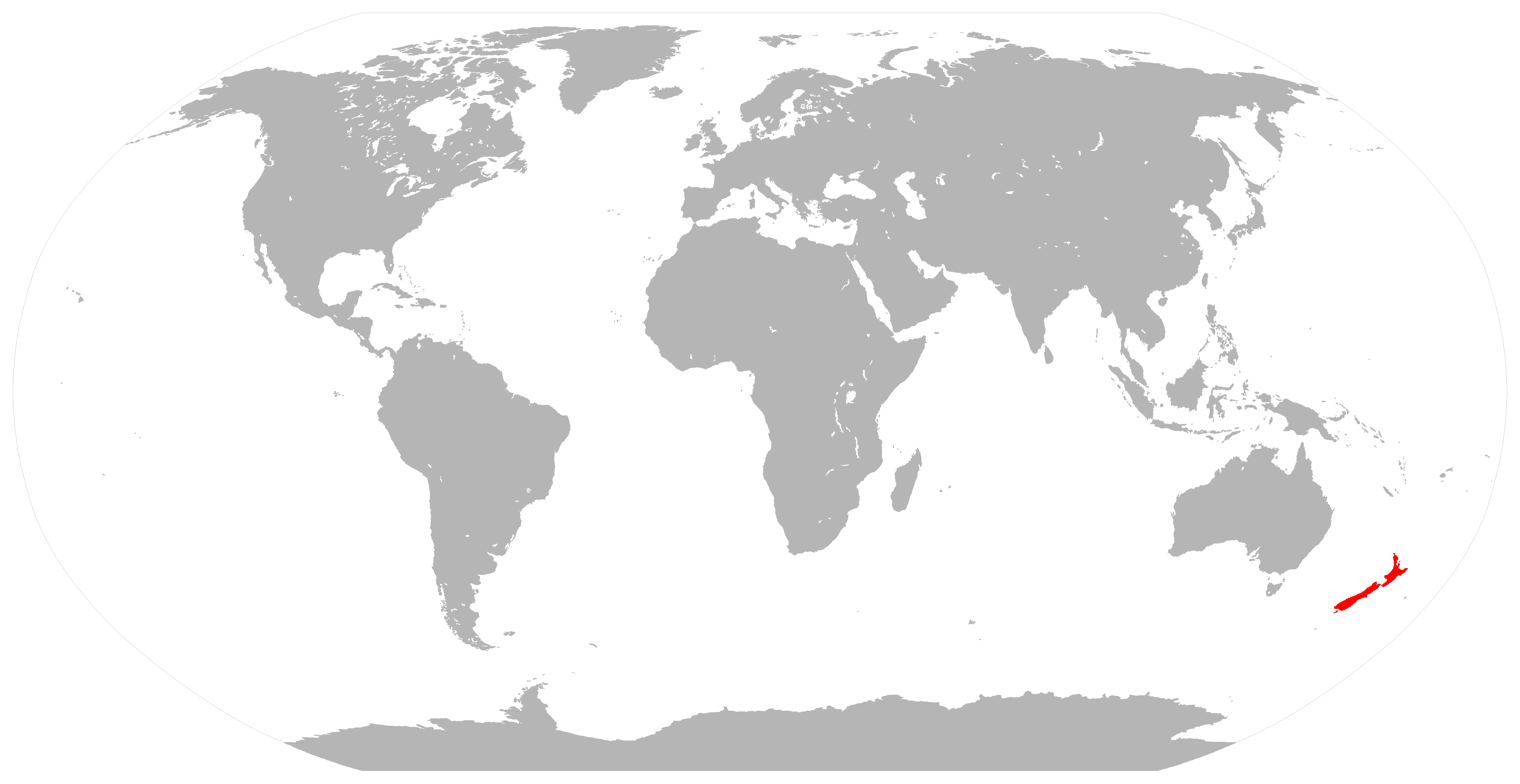

Synonyms
- Curuca igata (protonym); Gerygone flaviventris Gray 1844; Gerygone assimilis Buller 1865

= Grey warbler =

Species of bird

The grey warbler (Gerygone igata), also known by its Māori name riroriro, is an insectivorous bird in the family Acanthizidae endemic to New Zealand. Internationally, ornithologists usually refer to it as the grey gerygone or New Zealand gerygone to avoid confusion with unrelated birds also known as warblers. It is also sometimes known as the rainbird. The specific name igata was given by French naturalists Jean René Constant Quoy and Joseph Paul Gaimard, who claimed that this was the local name among the Māori inhabitants of Tasman Bay; this was likely a misunderstanding as no iwi are known to have a name resembling "igata" for the bird. Its natural habitat is forests, but also tends to occupy lower vegetation habitats. These insectivorous birds feed on insects living in shrubs, and often feed on the wing. They are found throughout New Zealand, as well as offshore islands where shrub exists. They also flourish in suburban areas where there is vegetation present.

== Description ==
The grey warbler has a long tail that is darker than its grey-brown body, with white tail end markings as well as a white tail underside. There is little sexual dimorphism between males and females, aside from females usually being smaller than males. Warblers are especially small; weighing around 6.5g with an average length of only around 10 cm. Adults have a signature ruby red eye, while juveniles have a brown eye, as well as yellowish feathers around the face and underbody. Its nest is especially unique among birds, with a pear shaped, dome like hanging nest that has a circular side entrance hole.

=== Song ===
The male's song often starts with a series of three squeaks and builds into a distinctive long plaintive wavering trill that rises and falls. Only the male warblers sing year-round, to attract mates and defend territory. Male songs are particularly loud during summer and spring, which lines up with the warblers breeding season. The warbler's song is a pleasant, soft warble and varies between different populations. In fact, studies looking at temporal aspects of warbler song found that the song shifted to a higher frequency over a period of 7 years. It was hypothesised that this was due to the reintroduction of native species to the warbler's habitat. The purpose of the song is not only to attract a mate, but also to ward off potential threats that enter a warbler's territory, whether that be predators or other warblers.

Grey warbler recording
Territorial call, flying between perches, answering a tape recorder.

== Distribution and habitat ==
Grey warblers are common throughout New Zealand's main islands and many off-shore islands, but are absent from open country and alpine areas. At home in native and exotic forests it may be found almost anywhere there is some tree or shrub cover.

== Behaviour ==
=== Feeding ===
The grey warbler is a predominantly insectivorous bird, feeding on organisms such as spiders, beetles, and flies. They do this by hovering around shrubs, and picking invertebrates off leaves. However, they have been seen to occasionally eat fruits, perhaps to make up for limiting nutrients that are low in invertebrates, or due to their very high energy method of feeding.

=== Breeding ===
The breeding season in grey warblers is especially long, lasting from August to January. A breeding pair usually establishes a territory around late July to August, and defends this territory until the end of the breeding season. Territories are defended by males by chasing away individuals, while also utilising loud, continuous singing. Females also tend to join in with these chases and tend to have a higher chance of joining the chase if an individual gets too close to the nest. In terms of mating behaviours, males sing all year around, and this identifies the sex of the warbler as there is no clear sexual dimorphism in the species aside from size. Males also perform a wing fluttering behaviour, involving rapid flapping of their wings. This is perhaps an effort to increase the strength of the pair bond and synchronise with their partners behaviour, as the display occurs throughout all stages of breeding, especially when the female is present.

=== Nesting and Parental Care ===
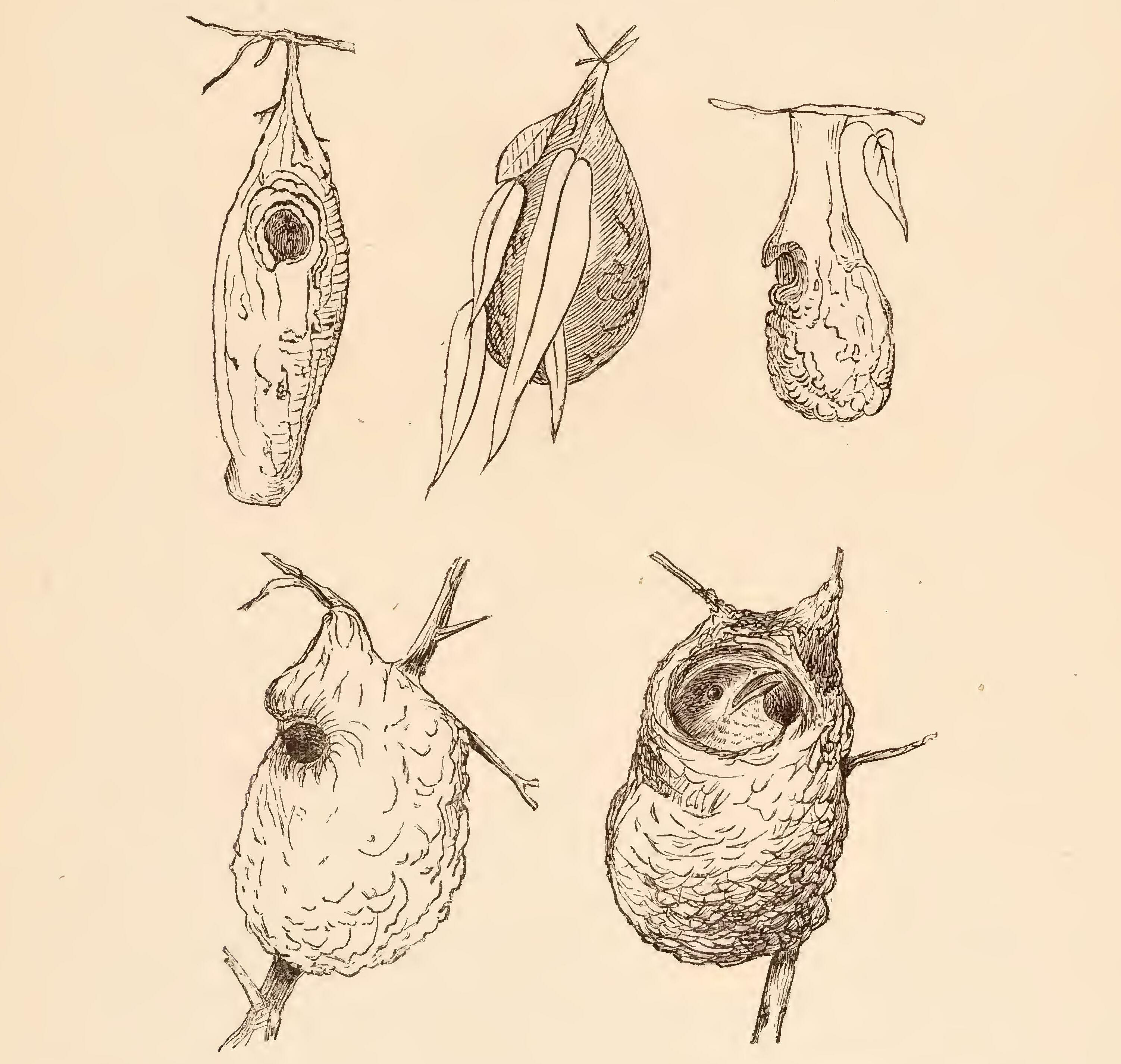
Illustrations of grey warbler nests (1888)

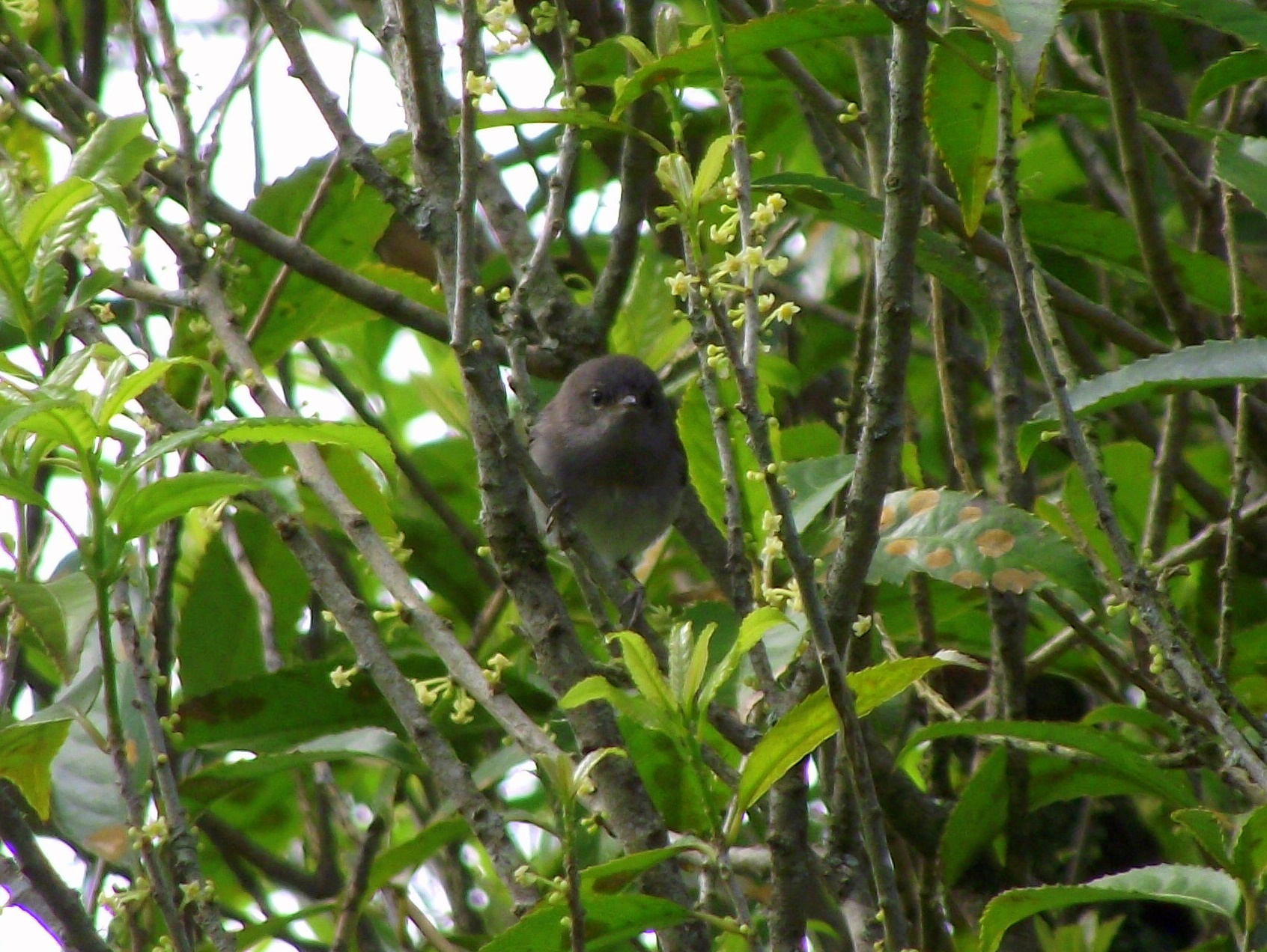
Juvenile grey warbler

Grey warblers are unique among New Zealand birds in building a pear-shaped nest with a side entrance near the top. Breeding season in the grey warbler lasts 6 months, from the first building to the last fledging. Their season starts early, and as a result they often complete building and laying before the last day. The early start for the season is likely due to parasitism by the shining cuckoo, Chrysococcyx lucidus. The early start allows the warbler chicks to be out of the nest by the time the cuckoos' season starts (around September or October), and therefore only the second clutch is impacted. Grey warblers' nest in a range of different small-leaved trees and shrubs, especially kānuka. Only females gather materials and build the nest, spending from 7–27 days to complete the pear-shaped nest. Males do, however, accompany the females on trips away from the nest, likely as an act of mate defence. These nests consist of a range of materials; the outside of the nest is often composed of stout material (for instance rootlets), as well as moss and sheep's wool, all bound together using cobwebs. Some of the nests also have a middle layer of wool or clematis seeds. The variation in nest materials often aligns with what is available in the warbler's home range.

After building, female warblers often only delay around 8 days before laying their eggs. Due to this fast turnover, nests found later in the breeding season are often difficult to find. Laying of eggs occurs over 15–16 weeks of the year, and the first clutch is laid at different times during a 6-week period. One clutch is often around 2–5 eggs, and there is at least a 2-day gap between the laying of each egg. Incubation occurs when the last egg is laid, where only the female incubates for a period of 17–21 days. Once hatched, the young warblers don't leave the nest for around 17 days, and once they have left the nest are still fed for around 35 days. Over the whole laying period, the grey warbler only produces two clutches at a slow rate over the long breeding season. This is likely due to New Zealand's mild conditions, which results in food not declining over the winter. Therefore, the warbler's population size will always be close to the limit set by resource availability, so there is reduced ability for extra breeding due to energy limitations.

Both sexes spend time feeding young. Grey Warblers will feed their young solely with small invertebrates, but traces of grass were seen in the gut of young warblers, likely due to accidental ingestion. Once food has been delivered to the nest, parents often remove the gelatinous faecal sacs produced by the nestlings, before moving to a perch 15m away from the nest to dispose of the sacs.

=== Begging ===
In avian species, begging behaviour is very common in young hatchlings, to capture the attention of a parent bird to gain access to more food. Often, the level of begging will differ depending on different factors, for instance hunger level and age. As with most animal behaviour, there is always a toss-up between the costs and the benefits of the behaviour; in this case, predation pressure will increase with more begging from young. In other bird species, studies have highlighted the positive correlation between increased begging behaviour and predation risk, especially for birds nesting at ground level. The begging behaviour of the grey warbler is especially unique, with many factors influencing how a parent responds to begging calls in its offspring. For instance, the adult grey warbler uses specific behaviours to reduce the predation pressure of the hatchlings' begging. Parents can utilise a switch-off signal/call, to communicate with its young when predators are present, and therefore stop the begging of the hatchlings to avoid being located by the predators. This is a feature of a lot of avian species, but studies discovered that after alarm calls, rather than ceasing begging, grey warbler hatchlings would change the structure of their call. This behaviour functions to reduce the cost of the begging behaviour, by increasing chance of being fed while also decreasing predation pressures.

Grey warbler hatchlings also alter their call depending on hunger and age. Studies highlighted that as a chick became hungrier, call structure narrowed in frequency range, while decreasing in amplitude. Furthermore, as a chick aged, duration decreased, and frequency increased. These differences in call structure with age and hunger highlight that begging in grey warbler hatchlings is far more complex than just begging for food; the type of call will communicate to the parent what state it is in, and therefore determine the amount of food a chick may receive. There are also interspecific impacts of these specific begging calls. For instance, the brood parasite Chrysococcyx lucidus (shining cuckoo) parasitises the grey warbler by laying its eggs into grey warbler nests during the second clutch, resulting in the parent grey warblers having to raise the cuckoo's young. This can have major consequences, as cuckoo chicks grow larger than warbler chicks, so often end up pushing the young warblers out of the nest. For the cuckoo hatchling to survive and be successful, it needs to identically mimic the grey warbler chicks begging behaviour. The complexity of grey warbler begging may mean that the cuckoo will also have to match these highly specific calls.

=== Aggression and territoriality ===
As mentioned, warblers set up territories just prior to breeding season, and therefore show aggressive behaviours to defend those territories. Studies indicated that the grey warbler displays very strong territorial behaviours in comparison to other birds. Males spend a smaller proportion of their time feeding chicks than other birds living in the same niche, and therefore have more time to perform vigilance and territorial behaviours. Warbler males also spend a significant amount of time mate guarding; for instance, when the female is gathering materials to build the nest. Studies highlighted the aggressive interspecific behaviour grey warblers show towards other bird species. For instance, it was discovered that the grey warbler has aggressive interspecific interactions with rifleman (Acanthisitta chloris). Grey warblers were observed during their breeding season to be chasing rifleman fledglings. In each situation, the adult grey warbler would chase the young rifleman silently, while the riflemen would be producing frantic distress calls to their parents. These chases would vary in length of time and would usually result in the parent rifleman producing an alarm call that would ward off the warbler. However, adult warblers would never chase the adult rifleman, only the juveniles. Aggressive behaviour like this may result in niche displacement of the young rifleman, which would benefit the warbler as it would give them more access to important resource. Therefore, it can be understood that there are several reasons for why an adult warbler would perform this behaviour, for instance, to defend resources within its territory, or competition for food. The former seems more likely, as warblers have often been observed to solve territorial disputes by chasing individuals out of their territory, therefore successfully defending nests, food sources, fledglings, and mates. However, it needs to be noted that more time spent performing territory behaviours is costly, as it means less time spent doing other vital behaviours, for instance feeding young. This highlights how behaviours always have costs and benefits, and for a behaviour to be successful, the benefits must outweigh the costs.

== In Māori culture ==
The direction in which a grey warbler would build its nest served as an indicator of forthcoming weather conditions to Māori – in this respect, the bird was known as a manu tohu tau. The tradition states that a grey warbler will build the nest entrance in the opposite direction to the prevailing wind. As such, an eastern-facing entrance would indicate a poorly season brought on by western winds; in contrast, a northern-facing entrance would suggest a pleasant season ahead.

In spring, the song of the grey warbler is said to be a signal for Māori to begin planting their crops. As such, those who 'ignore' the call of the grey warbler and do not help out with the planting of crops (and later seek to reap the harvest for themselves) are rebuked with the following whakataukī (proverb):

I whea koe i te tangihanga o te riroriro, ka mahi kai māu?
Where were you when the riroriro was singing, that you didn't work to get yourself food?

== Gallery ==
Grey warbler/ Riroriro/ Grey gerygone

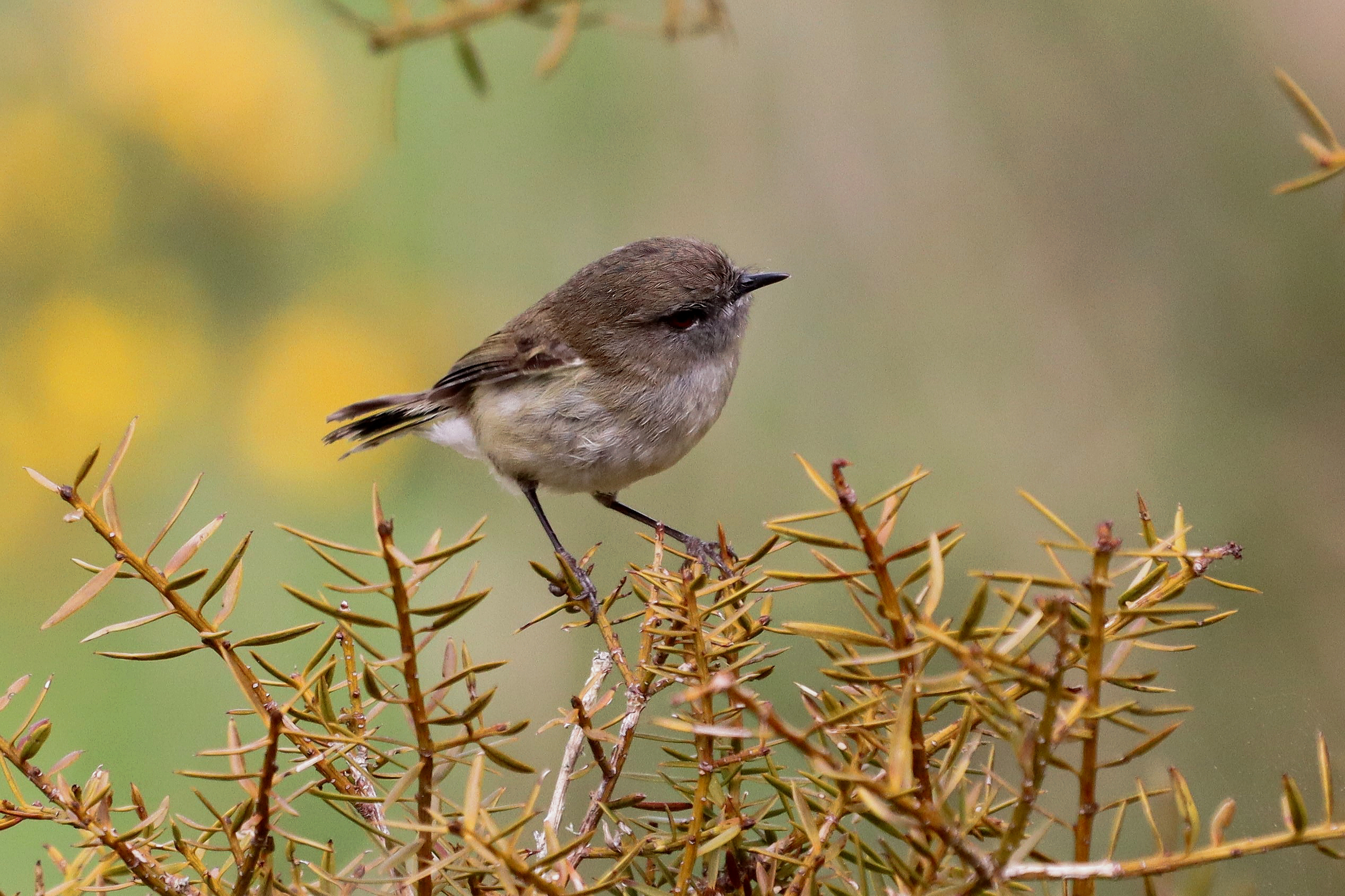

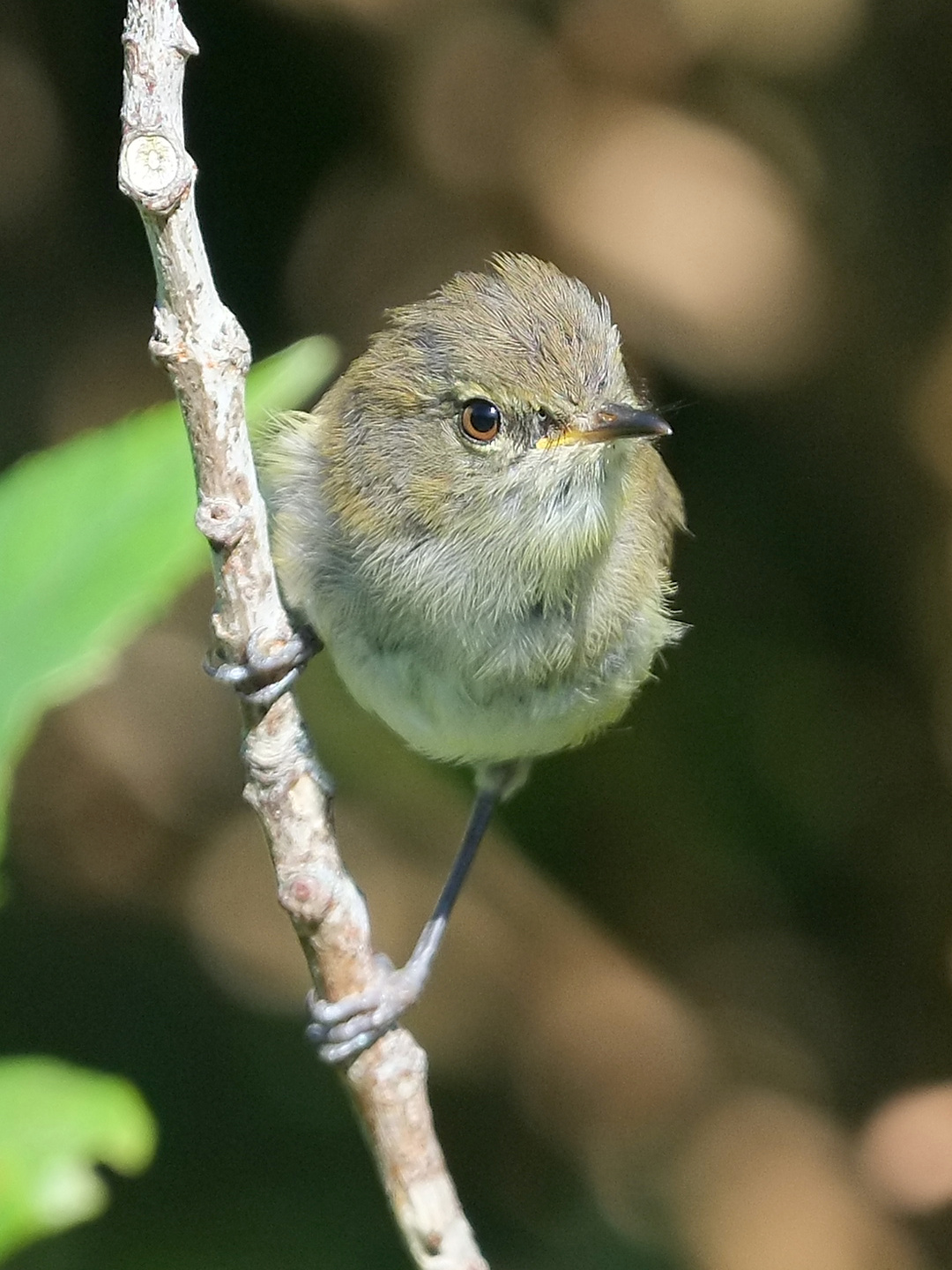

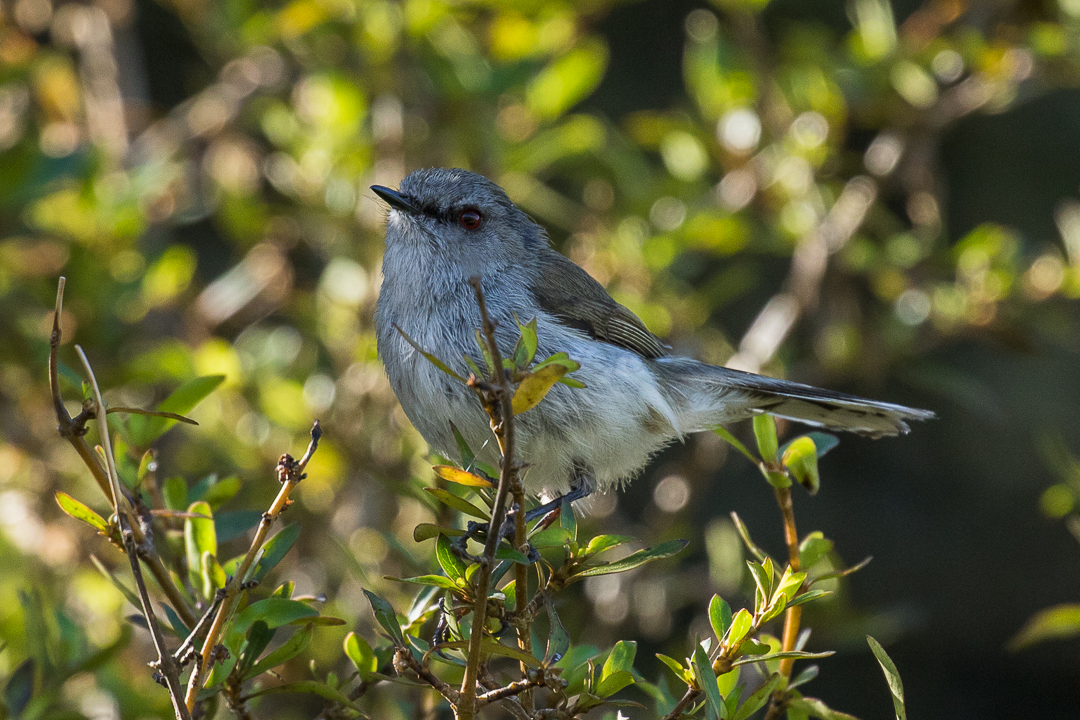

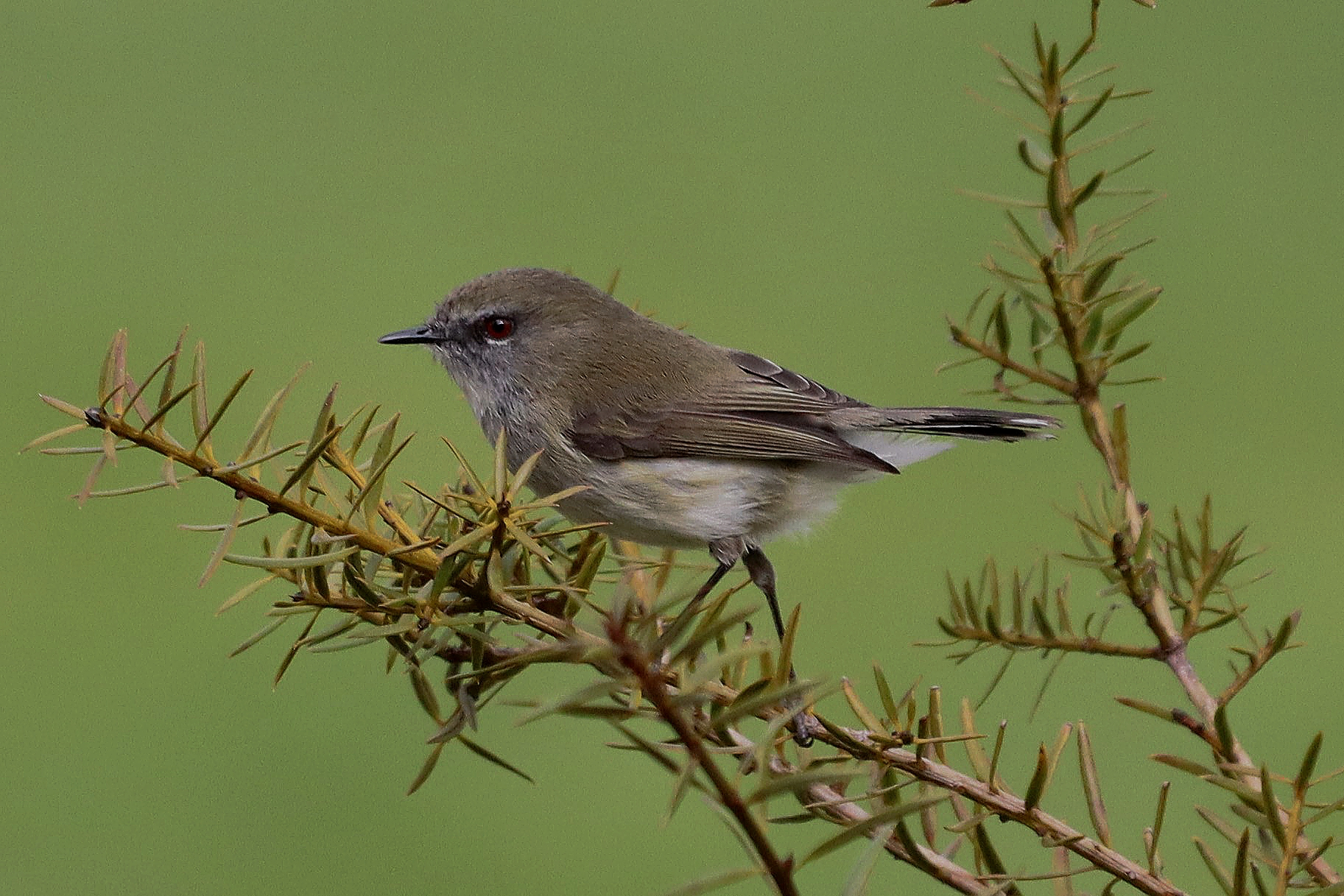
