= Alien Weaponry =

New Zealand Maori metal band

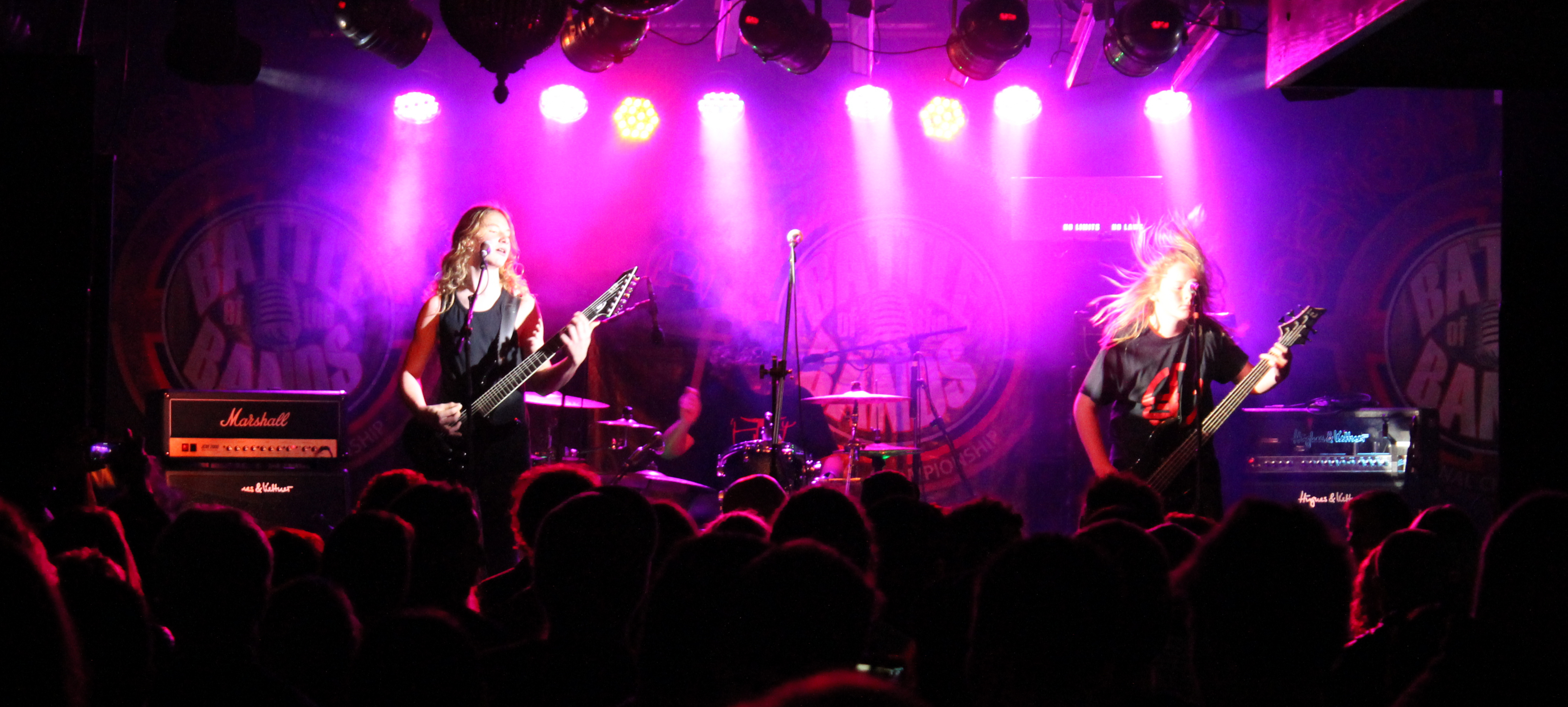
- Alien Weaponry in 2015

Background information
- Origin: Waipu, New Zealand
- Genres: Groove metal; thrash metal; alternative metal
- Years active: 2010–present
- Label: Napalm Records
- Members: Henry Te Reiwhati de Jong; Lewis Raharuhi de Jong; Tūranga Morgan-Edmonds
- Past members: Wyatt Channings; Ethan Trembath
- Website: alienweaponry.com

Alien Weaponry is a New Zealand heavy metal band from Waipu, formed in Auckland in 2010. The band consists of drummer Henry de Jong, guitarist Lewis de Jong, and since August 2020, bass player Tūranga Morgan-Edmonds. All three members have Māori ancestry and a number of their songs are written and performed in the Māori language.

== History ==
Alien Weaponry was formed in Auckland in 2010 by drummer Henry Te Reiwhati de Jong and his brother, guitarist/singer Lewis Raharuhi de Jong, who were 10 and 8 years old respectively. Their mother and maternal grandfather are of Dutch descent, and their father and paternal grandmother are Māori. Their tribal connections are with Ngāti Pikiao and Ngāti Raukawa. The brothers named the band Alien Weaponry after watching the film District 9. After moving to the small town of Waipu, bassist Ethan Trembath joined them in April 2013. Trembath replaced Wyatt Channings, who briefly played bass for the band the previous year. The band were managed by the de Jong boys' father Niel, an experienced rock musician and audio engineer who also served as front of house sound engineer when they toured. Their mother, Jette, is the band's tour manager and publicist.

In 2016, the band won the national finals of Smokefree Rockquest and Smokefree Pacifica Beats (now Smokefree Tangata Beats) — the first of two bands to win both events (the other is Top Shelf of Manurewa High School in 2024). They placed second in the 2015 Smokefree Rockquest, and were regional finalists four years running. The band toured with New Zealand chart-topping band Devilskin on their "We Rise" tour in 2014, and performed at The Powerstation in support of Shihad in May 2015. Alien Weaponry are believed to be the youngest recipients of New Zealand on Air funding with their song "Rū Ana Te Whenua" in October 2015. They received a NZ$10,000 grant to complete recording their song and produce a video in 2015, and another two NZ$10,000 On Air grants in 2016 to record their singles, "Urutaa" and "Raupatu", and produce music videos. In 2016, UK Metal Hammer magazine named the band one of New Zealand's top 10 metal acts.

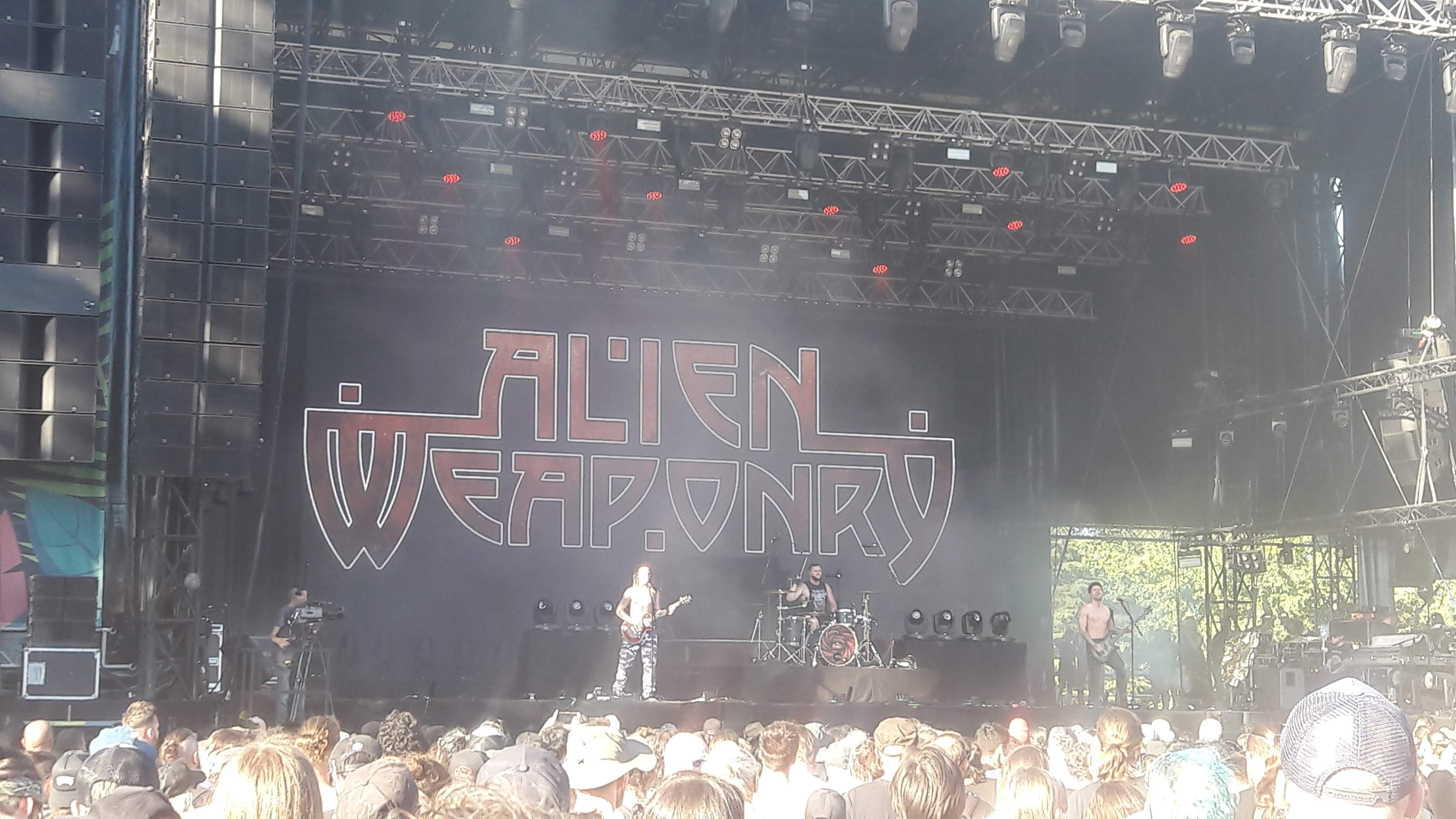
Alien Weaponry performing in 2022

The band toured Europe and North America for the first time in the latter half of 2018, supporting Ministry in their American tour. During their European tour, they performed at several large music festivals, including Metaldays, and Wacken Open Air. In 2019, they toured Europe and North America again. Trembath returned to New Zealand to finish his high school exams and was unavailable for the final American leg of the tour; bassist Bobby Oblak filled in. The band stated their goal was performing at Wacken before Henry was 20. Henry was 18 at the time of their performance.

On 17 February 2019, the band (alongside Radio New-Zealand) released a ten part documentary series, Alien Weaponry Shake Europe, which documented their European tour the year prior. In December 2018, Holding My Breath was the official theme song for NXT TakeOver: Phoenix.

On 19 August 2020, it was announced that Trembath would depart the band and be replaced with Tūranga Morgan-Edmonds, also Māori, of Ngāti Rārua, Ngāti Wai and Ngāti Hine. In an official video, Trembath said the reason for leaving the band was "health and my own happiness" and pursuing a career in making music in studio.

On 10 September 2020, the band announced they were shifting management to The Rick Sales Entertainment Group based in Los Angeles. Rick Sales is the manager of Slayer and represents other metal artists such as Gojira, Mastodon and Ghost. Niel de Jong continued as production manager and front of house engineer.

Alien Weaponry appeared on the cover of British heavy metal publication Metal Hammer Magazine in January 2021, with the tag line "Meet The Future Of Metal" The Guardian profiled the band in September 2021.

They were nominated for 'Breakthrough Oceanian Band' and 'Breakthrough International Band' at the 2021 Global Metal Apocalypse awards, and finished third and fourth, respectively. In 2023, the song 'Kai Tangata' from Tū became the theme for New Zealand-born pro wrestler Henare.

=== Albums ===
Alien Weaponry released their debut EP, The Zego Sessions, in August 2014, and began work on their debut album at Neil Finn's Roundhead Studios in Auckland, with record producer Tom Larkin, in September 2015. In November 2016, Alien Weaponry released the single and music video for "Urutaa" from their then-upcoming album. In February 2017, the second single, "Raupatu", was released, and in July 2017, they released "Rū Ana Te Whenua".

In January 2018, the band went back into the studio to continue work on their first full-length album, which included hits "Kai Tangata" and "Holding My Breath". On 1 June 2018, their album Tū was released, debuting at number five on the New Zealand album charts, the top New Zealand album of the week.

On 17 September 2021, they released their sophomore album, Tangaroa, also produced and mixed at their studio in Waipu New Zealand.

Alien Weaponry released their latest album, Te Rā, on 28 March 2025, via Napalm Records.

== Musical style, influences and lyrical themes ==
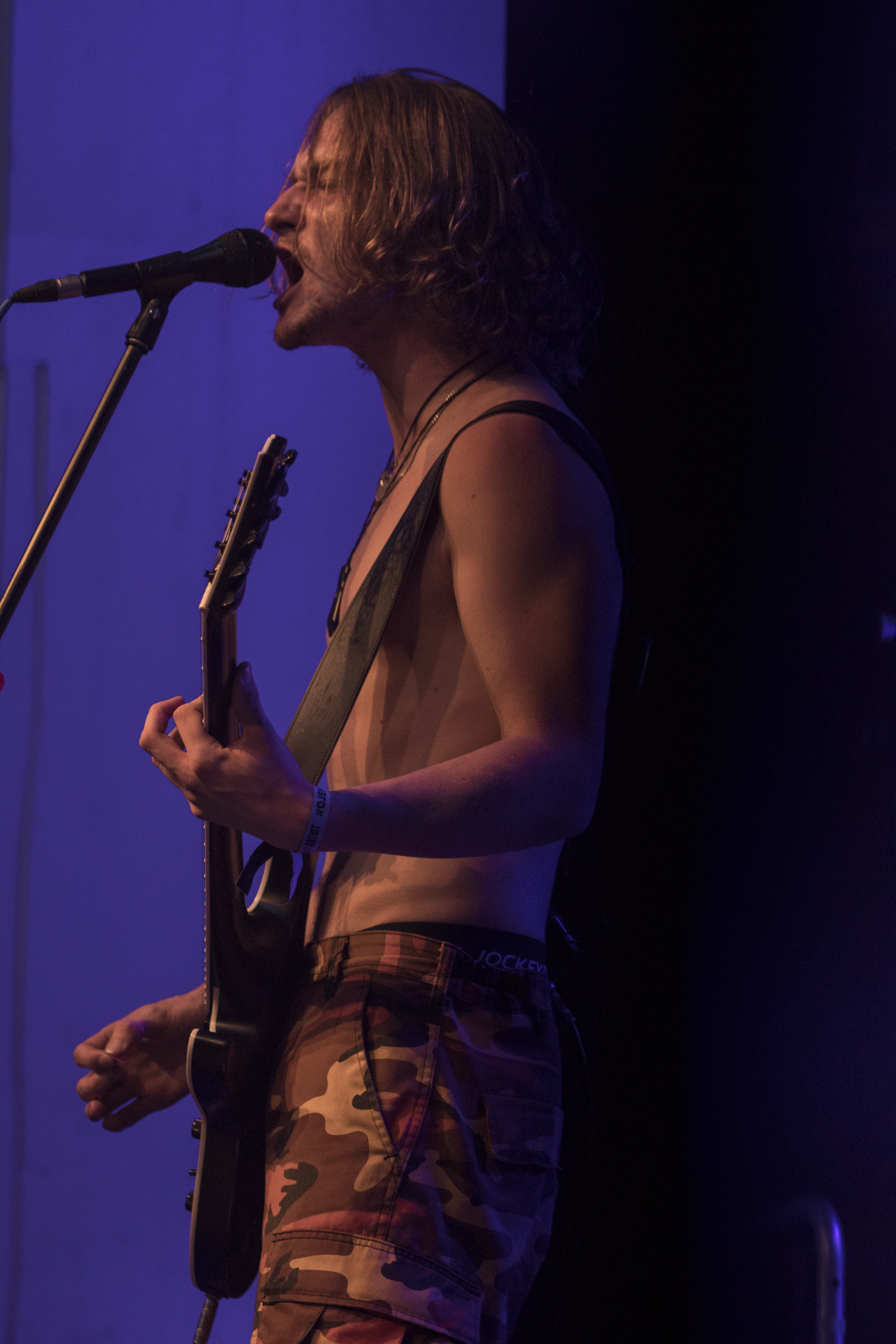
Guitarist and vocalist Lewis Raharuhi de Jong

Alien Weaponry's debut single, "Urutaa", is sung partly in the Māori language and was originally about a clash of ideas and expectations leading to stress and unhappiness, which was likened to a plague or urutaa (an outbreak). The Māori lyrics refer to events that occurred in the Bay of Islands in the 1800s and what followed after a pocket watch was inadvertently dropped into the harbour. The misunderstanding culminated in the burning of the Boyd, a grim set of events in New Zealand's colonial history. The band says, "This incident is used in this song as a metaphor for the misunderstandings that continue to plague us today – between cultures, generations and individuals who torment each other through lack of understanding."

The band's second single "Raupatu" (released in February 2017) is about land confiscations by the New Zealand colonial government in the 1800s and the legislation of 1863 that allowed it to happen. Their third single, "Rū Ana te Whenua" (the trembling earth), released 1 July 2017, refers to the mighty battle at Pukehinahina/Gate Pa in 1864 where the brothers' great-great-great-grandfather, Te Ahoaho, lost his life.

The band's musical style has been described as "nü-metal tinged thrash" and "thrashing groove-metal", with the band naming Metallica, Rage Against the Machine, and Lamb of God as inspirations. They are also often likened to a Māori version of Roots-era Sepultura, both for their musical style and infusion of indigenous culture into their music.

Guitarist Lewis de Jong cites Stevie Ray Vaughan, Lamb of God, System of a Down, Meshuggah, and Polyphia as influences.

== Members ==
=== Current members ===
- Henry de Jong – drums, backing vocals (2010–present)
- Lewis de Jong – guitars, lead vocals (2010–present)
- Tūranga Morgan-Edmonds – bass, backing vocals (2020–present)

=== Former members ===
- Wyatt Channings – bass, backing vocals (2012)
- Ethan Trembath – bass, backing vocals (2013–2020)

== Discography ==
=== Studio albums ===
Title	Album details	Peak chart positions				
Title	Album details	NZ	NZ Artist	GER	SWI	US Heat
Tū	Released: 1 June 2018; Label: Napalm Records; Format: CD, LP, digital download, streaming	5	1	—	—	25
Tangaroa	Released: 17 September 2021; Label: Napalm; Format: CD, LP, digital download, streaming	19	4	85	98	—
Te Rā	Released: 28 March 2025; Label: Napalm; Format: CD, LP, digital download, streaming	30	—	—	—	—
"—" denotes a recording that did not chart.

=== Extended plays ===
Title	Album details
The Zego Sessions	Released: 2014; Label: Self-released

=== Singles ===
Title	Year	Peak chart positions	Album
Title	Year	NZ Artist Hot	Album
"Urutaa"	2016	—	Tū
"Raupatu"	2017	—	Tū
"Rū Ana Te Whenua"	2017	—	Tū
"Holding My Breath"	2018	—	Tū
"Kai Tangata"	2018	13	Tū
"Ahi Kā"	2019	8	Tangaroa
"Blinded"	2019	19	Tangaroa
"Tangaroa"	2021	12	Tangaroa
"Buried Underground"	2021	—	Tangaroa
"Hatupatu"	2021	—	Tangaroa
"—" denotes a recording that did not chart.
