= Works of Robert Lawson =

Architectural curriculum vitae

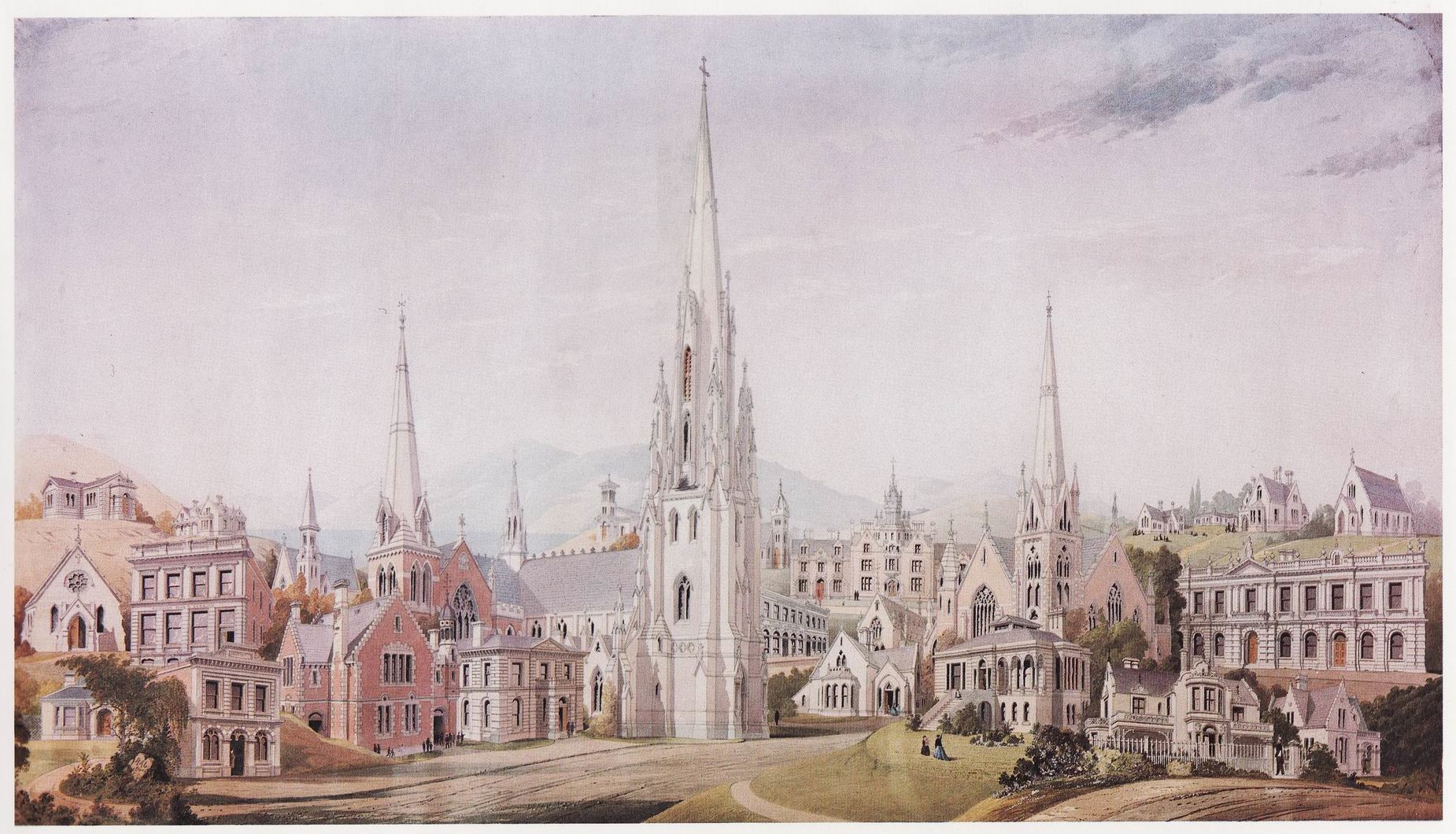
Artist George O'Brien created this watercolour painting in the 1860s showing a selection of Lawson's designs

This list of works by Robert Lawson categorises and provides brief details of the structures designed by Scottish-born architect Robert A. Lawson (1833–1902) who is said did more than any other designer to shape the face of the Victorian era architecture of the city of Dunedin.

Lawson designed an estimated 46 church buildings, 21 banks, 134 houses, 16 school buildings, 13 hotels, 15 civic and institutional buildings, and 120 commercial and industrial buildings. Of these 94 survive, including 46 in Dunedin, 43 in the rest of New Zealand and five in Melbourne.

Among the buildings which Lawson personally designed, collaborated on or supervised the design of are:

Building	Type	Completed	Location	Notes
Free Church School	Education	1857	Steiglitz, near Geelong, Victoria	
Roman Catholic School	Education	1858	Steiglitz, near Geelong, Victoria	
House	Residential	1862	Dunedin	
Cottage	Residential	1862	Dunedin	Eight-room wooden cottage.
Cottage, Dowling Street	Residential	1862	Dowling Street, Dunedin	
Cottages for J. J. Waters (6 off)	Residential	1862	Dunedin?	Four-roomed.
Business premises for Bing Harris and Co.	Commercial/Industrial	1863	High Street, Dunedin	
Business premises for John Duncan	Commercial/Industrial	1863	Maclaggan Street, Dunedin	
Business premises for McLandress, Hepburn & Co.	Commercial/Industrial	1863	Manse Street, Dunedin	
Business premises for Oliver and Ulph, wholesale ironmongers	Commercial/Industrial	1863	Manse Street, Dunedin	
Café for G. Malin	Commercial/Industrial	1863	High Street, Dunedin	
Cottage	Residential	1863	Maitland Street, Dunedin	Four-roomed.
Cottages for William Fraser	Residential	1863	Royal Terrace, Dunedin	
Cottages (two off)	Residential	1863	Royal Terrace, Dunedin	
House	Residential	1863	Halfway Bush, Dunedin	
House for Thomas Dick	Residential	1863	Queen Street, Dunedin	
Otago Benevolent Institution	Civic/Institutional	1863	Caversham, Dunedin	
Warehouse and offices for Sargood, King and Sargood	Commercial/Industrial	1863	Stafford Street, Dunedin	Now part of No. 22 Stafford Street, the premises of Dunedin Wesleyan Church
Waikouaiti Presbyterian Church	Ecclesiastical	1863	Kildare Street, Waikouaiti	Small, timber gothic revival church. Demolished.
Temporary building for First Church congregation	Ecclesiastical	1864	Dowling Street, Dunedin	
Anderson's Bay Presbyterian Church	Ecclesiastical	1864	Corner of 76 Silverton Street and Spottiswoode Street, Andersons Bay, Dunedin	Opened in February 1864. Even after a new brick church was constructed in 1913, this wooden church remained in use for many years as a hall. Still exists as of August 2012. Granted Heritage New Zealand historic place category 2 status in 2017.
Alterations to printing offices for Mills, Dick & Co.	Commercial/Industrial	1864	Stafford Street, Dunedin	
Baptist Church	Ecclesiastical	1864	Corner of Hanover and Great King Streets, Dunedin	Demolished by 1912.
Cottage	Residential	1864	Port Chalmers	Six roomed.
Extensions to premises for A. Meyer	Commercial/Industrial	1864	Princes Street, Dunedin	
Extensions to premises for Ferguson and Mitchell	Commercial/Industrial	1864	Princes Street, Dunedin	
House	Residential	1864	Royal Terrace, Dunedin	Villa.
House for Archibald Barr	Residential	1864	London Street, Dunedin	Barr was Lawson's brother-in-law.
House for Robert and Jessie Lawson	Residential	1864	Bellevue Street, Roslyn, Dunedin	Lawson's private residence.
House for William Purdie	Residential	1864	Location unknown	
House for Andrew Todd	Residential	1864	East Taieri	
Offices for Murray Kerr & Co.	Commercial/Industrial	1864	Crawford Street, Dunedin	The building featured a range of nine offices, designed for use by shipping agents.
Schoolhouse, Wakari	Education	1864	Wakari, Dunedin	
South Dunedin District School	Residential	1864	William Street, Dunedin	Generally known as Park's School after its first headmaster. Now a private residence.
Store for J. and J. H. Barr	Commercial/Industrial	1864	Stafford Street, Dunedin	
Store for Marshall & Co.	Commercial/Industrial	1864	Wakari, Dunedin	
Allanton Presbyterian Church	Ecclesiastical	1865	Corner of Grey and Precelly Streets, Allanton	It was originally built in a gully and thus being prone to flooding. In 1904 it was pulled up by two steam traction engines, to a more commanding position on the hill above. The last service in the Church took place on 11 October 1998. The building is now privately owned.
Block of brick buildings	Commercial/Industrial	1865	Princes Street, Dunedin	Unknown client.
Palmerston Presbyterian Church	Ecclesiastical	1865	Gilligan Street, Palmerston	Still exists and is used as a builders workshop.
St George's Hall	Civic/Institutional	1865	Upper Stuart Street, Dunedin	
Store for G. G. Russell & Co.	Commercial/Industrial	1865	High Street, Dunedin	
Bank of Otago	Bank	1866	Clutha Ferry (Balclutha)	
Extensions to Mornington Schoolhouse	Education	1866	Mornington, Dunedin	
Extensions to premises of A. R. Livingstone, stationers	Commercial/Industrial	1866	Princes Street, Dunedin	
House	Residential	1866	Cargill Street, Dunedin	Six-roomed. Believed to still exist at no. 56.
House	Residential	1866	York Place, Dunedin	Four-roomed.
House	Residential	1866	near Dunedin	Villa.
House for Thomas Shand	Residential	1866	West Taieri	
Jopp's Hotel	Hotel	1866	Clutha Ferry (Balclutha)	
Manse for St Paul's Presbyterian Church	Residential	1866	Oamaru	
Masonic Hall	Civic/Institutional	1866	Itchen, Oamaru	Still exists as of August 2012.
Offices and free bond for Service, Gibson & Co.	Commercial/Industrial	1866	Lower High Street, Dunedin	Later the premises of the Dunedin Savings Bank and then La Maison. Still exists
Otepopo St John's Presbyterian Church	Ecclesiastical	1866	State Highway 1), Herbert	Still exists as of september 2023. Designed only the west wing, which featured his first use of Oamaru Stone. The remainder of the building was designed by William Mason when it was extended in 1870. It now houses a pipe organ museum.
School and Schoolmasters House, Clutha Ferry	Education	1866	Clutha ferry (Balclutha)	
School and Schoolmasters House, Palmerston	Education	1866	Palmerston	
The Dunedin Boot and Shoe Company Building	Commercial/Industrial	1866	Princes Street (west side, between Dowling and Rattray), Dunedin	
Woolshed for J .H. Barr	Commercial/Industrial	1866	Albert Downs sheep farm, Kaihiku	
Bank of New Zealand, Tokomairiro	Bank	1867	Milton	At the time of the banks construction the settlement was known as Tokomairiro.
Bank of New Zealand, Hawksbury	Bank	1867	Waikouaiti	
Business premises for A. Hassell	Commercial/Industrial	1867	York Place, Dunedin	
Business premises for Herbert & Co.	Commercial/Industrial	1867	Lawrence	
Business premises for J. and W. Robertson, Matheson Bros.	Commercial/Industrial	1867	Princes Street, Dunedin	
Commercial Hotel, Lawrence	Hotel	1867	Lawrence	
Cottage	Residential	1867	Canongate, Dunedin	Four-roomed.
Dwelling house	Residential	1867	Cargill Street, Dunedin	Six-roomed. Believed to still exist.
House "Brooklands" for J . P. Hepburn	Residential	1867	Goodwood, near Palmerston	Still exists as of August 2012.
House for H. S. Fish	Residential	align=center	Stafford Street, Dunedin	Constructed of stone and brick.
House for H. J. Millar	Residential	1867	Brook, near Oamaru	
House for J. Mackenzie	Residential	1867	Wakari	Built of stone.
House for R. B. Martin	Residential	1867	Roslyn, Dunedin	Villa.
Manse for First Church of Otago	Residential	1867	Moray Place, Dunedin	This was a two-storey building, faced entirely with Oamaru stone with a oriel window, and a Gothic doorway.
Manse for North Taieri Presbyterian Church	Residential	1867	North Taieri	Still exists as of August 2012.
North Taieri Presbyterian Church	Ecclesiastical	1867	39 Wairongoa Road, North Taieri	Still exists as of August 2012. Granted Heritage New Zealand historic place category 2 status in 2005.
Otepopo Presbyterian Manse	Residential	1867	1895 Maheno-Herbert Road (State Highway 1), Herbert	Granted Heritage New Zealand historic place category 2 status in 1983.
Otokia Presbyterian Church	Ecclesiastical	1867	Near Henley	
Pukehiki Presbyterian Church	Ecclesiastical	1867	Highcliff Road, Otago Peninsula	
Schoolhouse, West Taieri	Education	1867	West Taieri	
Warden's Court, Lawrence	Civic/Institutional	1867	Lawrence	Later used as the Post Office. Still exists as of August 2012.
Alterations to building	Residential	1868	Port Chalmers	
Business premises for A. and T. Inglis	Commercial/Industrial	1868	George Street, Dunedin	
Business premises for Richard Pearson	Commercial/Industrial	1868	York Place, Dunedin	
Building for William Kettle	Commercial/Industrial	1868	Port Chalmers	
Extensions to building for Bing Harris & Co.	Commercial/Industrial	1868	High Street, Dunedin	
Extensions to building for Sargood, King & Co.	Commercial/Industrial	1868	Stafford Street, Dunedin	
House for J. Blakeley	Residential	1868	Manor Place, Dunedin	
House for A. J. Grant	Residential	1868	Beaumont Station, Clutha District	
House for James Paterson	Residential	1868	Crichton, Tokomairiro (Milton)	
Roman Catholic Chapel	Ecclesiastical	1868	Waikouaiti	
St Patrick's Roman Catholic Church	Ecclesiastical	1868	Oamaru	
School and Masters House, Otepopo	Education	1868	Otepopo	
Star and Garter Hotel	Hotel	1868	13–17 Itchen Street, Oamaru	See text. Construction commenced in 1866. Still exists as of August 2012. Granted Heritage New Zealand historic place category 1 status in 1991.
Bank of New Zealand, Hawksbury	Bank	1869	Waikouaiti	Built in stone. Still exists as of August 2012. Granted Heritage New Zealand historic place category 2 status in 1997.
Bank of New Zealand, Palmerston	Bank	1869	Palmerston	
Bank of New Zealand, Timaru	Bank	1869	Timaru	
Business premises	Commercial/Industrial	1869	George Street, Dunedin	Unknown client.
Business premises	Commercial/Industrial	1869	West Taieri	Unknown client.
Business premises for Butterworth brothers	Commercial/Industrial	1869	High Street, Dunedin	
Business premises for C. Ziele & Co and Charles Moore saddler	Commercial/Industrial	1869	Rattray Street, Dunedin	
Business premises for Edward McGlashan	Commercial/Industrial	1869	Princes Street, Dunedin	
Business premises for George Young Jewellers	Commercial/Industrial	1869	Princes Street, Dunedin	
Business premises for Hay Bros and Wright	Commercial/Industrial	1869	Corner of Princes Street and Upper Octagon, Dunedin	
Business premises for James Wall	Commercial/Industrial	1869	Princes Street, Dunedin	
Business premises for C. Steinhoft	Commercial/Industrial	1869	Corner of Princes and Rattray Streets, Dunedin	
Business premises for R. K. Murray	Commercial/Industrial	1869	Rattray Street, Dunedin	
Business premises ( 2 off)	Commercial/Industrial	1869	Tokomairiro (Milton)	Unknown client.
Cottage	Residential	1869	Rattray Street, Dunedin	
Cottage for Allan Harvey	Residential	1869	Palmerston	
House	Residential	1869	Caversham, Dunedin	
House	Residential	1869	Pelichet Bay, Dunedin	
House for Peter Eagle	Residential	1869	15 Scotland Street, Dunedin	Still exists as of August 2012.
Manse	Residential	1869	Clinton, Popotunoa	
Store and dwelling rooms	Commercial/Industrial	1869	Murrayville (Maori Hill), Dunedin	
Wesleyan Trinity Church	Ecclesiastical	1869	Corner of Upper Stuart Street and Moray Place, Dunedin	Now the Fortune Theatre.
Presbyterian Meeting Hall	Other ecclesiastical	1869	Roslyn, Otago Peninsula	Still exists
Baking oven for Hudson's Biscuit Manufacturers	Commercial/Industrial	1870	Princes Street, Dunedin	
Bank of Otago, Milton	Bank	1870	Milton	Later National Bank of New Zealand.
Bank of Otago, Outram	Bank	1870	5 Mountfort Street, Outram	This highly decorated timber building was later occupied by the National Bank of New Zealand. It is now a private residence. Granted Heritage New Zealand historic place category 2 status in 2005.
Bank of Otago, Port Chalmers	Bank	1870	George Street, Port Chalmers	Later National Bank of New Zealand. Still exists as of August 2012.
Business premises for B. Stohr	Commercial/Industrial	1870	Maclaggan Street, Dunedin	
East Taieri Presbyterian church	Ecclesiastical	1870	East Taieri.	Gothic, lighter quoins, spire, substantial buttresses. Still exists as of August 2012. Granted Heritage New Zealand historic place category 2 status in 2004.
Hampden Presbyterian Church	Ecclesiastical	1870	4 London Street and Chelmsford Street, Hampden	Still exists as of August 2012. Granted Heritage New Zealand historic place category 2 status in 1983.
House	Residential	1870	152 London Street, Dunedin	
House	Residential	1870	Maori Hill, Dunedin	
House	Residential	1870	Regent Road, Dunedin	
House "Essequibo" for James Paterson	Residential	1870	Corner of High, Alva and Montpellier (then called Ann) Streets, Mornington, Dunedin	Paterson was a relative of Lawson's wife.
House for J. Douglas	Residential	1870	Mount Royal, Waitaki District	
House for L. Thoneman	Residential	1870	George Street, Dunedin	
House for W. H. Teschemaker	Residential	1870	Taipo Hill Estate	
Lawrence Holy Trinity Anglican Church	Ecclesiastical	1870	Lawrence	Demolished in 1924.
Kakanui Presbyterian Church	Ecclesiastical	1870	Waimate	Wooden construction. Its final service was held in November 2019. It is now a privately owned.
St Andrew's Presbyterian Church	Ecclesiastical	1870	Corner of Carroll and Melville Streets, Dunedin	Later Word of Life Church, then Archangel Michael Coptic Orthodox Church). Granted Heritage New Zealand historic place category 2 status in 1982.
Thomas Collins Hotel	Hotel	1870	Corner of Frederick and George Streets, Dunedin	Later the White Horse Hotel.
Bank of Otago, Oamaru	Bank	1871	11 Thames Street, Oamaru	Palladian. Later National Bank of New Zealand and since 2012 a branch of the ANZ Bank. Granted Heritage New Zealand historic place category 1 status in 1982.
Building, small wooden	Commercial/Industrial	1871	Unknown	Unknown client.
Business premises for Arthur Briscoe & Co	Commercial/Industrial	1871	Corner of Jetty and Princes Streets, Dunedin	
Business premises for H. S. Fish jnr.	Commercial/Industrial	1871	Princes Street, Dunedin	
Commercial Hotel	Hotel	1871	Tokomairiro (Milton)	
Extensions to iron store	Commercial/Industrial	1871	Rattray Street, Dunedin	
Extensions to Gunn & Ross's Ironmongery warehouse	Commercial/Industrial	1871	Princes Street, Dunedin	
House	Residential	1871	Near Portobello, Otago Peninsula	
House	Residential	1871	Melrose, Dunedin	Four-roomed.
House for Dr Borrows	Residential	1871	11 Moray Place, Dunedin	
House for James Smith	Residential	1871	Greenfield Station, Lawrence	
Manse for Presbyterian Church	Residential	1871	Palmerston	
North Dunedin (St Stephen's) Presbyterian Church	Ecclesiastical	1871	Corner of Howe and Great at King Streets, Dunedin	Still in use as of September 2023.
Stables	Commercial/Industrial	1871	Wakari, Dunedin	
Store and dwelling house	Commercial/Industrial	1871	Kaikorai Road, Dunedin	
Cottage	Residential	1872	Wakari, Dunedin	
Business premises for George Matthews	Commercial/Industrial	1872	Moray Place, Dunedin	
Business premises for Matheson Brothers	Commercial/Industrial	1872	Princes Street, Dunedin	
Business premises for R. Wilson & Co.	Commercial/Industrial	1872	Corner of Bond and Jetty Streets, Dunedin	
House "Fairy Knowe" for James Smith	Residential	1872	Andersons Bay, Dunedin	
House for B. C. Haggit	Residential	1872	Melrose, Dunedin	
House for James Whitelaw	Residential	1872	9 Dundas Street, Dunedin	Villa. Still exists as of August 2012. Off Queen Street.
House for J. W. Murdoch	Residential	1872	Pleasant Valley, Waitaki District	
Salutation Hotel	Hotel	1872	Corner of Arthur and Rattray Streets, Dunedin	Demolished in 1957.
Shops (2 off) and dwelling house	Commercial/Industrial	1872	George Street, Dunedin	
St Mary's Anglican Church	Ecclesiastical	1872	8 Stromness Street, Palmerston	Constructed of stone in the Gothic style. Still exists as of August 2012. Granted Heritage New Zealand historic place category 2 status in 2011.
St Patrick's Roman Catholic School, Lawrence	Education	1872	13 Colonsay Street, Lawrence	Granted Heritage New Zealand historic place category 1 status in 1990.
Business premises for Andrew Mercer, grocer	Commercial/Industrial	1873	Rattray Street, Dunedin	
Business premises for F. Meenan, produce merchant	Commercial/Industrial	1873	George Street, Dunedin	
Business premises for George Gray Russell & Co.	Commercial/Industrial	1873	Corner of Bond, Crawford and Water Streets, Dunedin	Still exists as the Trustees Executors Company Building.
Business premises for Murray Roberts & Co.	Commercial/Industrial	1873	Stafford Street, Dunedin	
Business premises for Wm Gilchrist, painter	Commercial/Industrial	1873	George Street, Dunedin	
Business premises for J. T. Mackerras & Co.	Commercial/Industrial	1873	Bond Street, Dunedin	
Business premises for Reid & Gray	Commercial/Industrial	1873	Unknown	For use as a implement and machine warehouse.
Cottage for James Mollison	Residential	1873	Dunedin	
First Church of Otago	Ecclesiastical	1873	Moray Place, Dunedin	This has been described by the Institute of Architects as a "Magnificent example of Gothic Architecture" (1867–1873).
House	Residential	1873	Maitland Street, Dunedin	
House for J. L. Butterworth	Residential	1873	Heriot Row, Dunedin	
House for John Reith	Residential	1873	Smith Street, Dunedin	
House for Dr T. J. Dick	Residential	1873	Moray Place, Dunedin	
House "Salisbury" for Donald Reid	Residential	1873	141 Waironga Road, North Taieri	Lawson designed this substantial two-storey brick residence which incorporated an earlier dwelling which had been built in 1863. Granted Heritage New Zealand historic place category 2 status in 2017.
National Mortgage and Agency Company of New Zealand building	Commercial	1873	Bond, Water and Crawford Streets, Dunedin	Now the Trustees Executors Office.
Shop for W. Kettle	Commercial/Industrial	1873	Port Chalmers	
Store for W. Higgins	Commercial/Industrial	1873	Waitahuna	
Wilson's Bond	Commercial/Industrial	1873	north west corner of Bond and Jetty Streets, Dunedin	
Building for Guthrie and Larnach (First stage)	Commercial/Industrial	1874	Dunedin	
Business premises for Brown Ewing & Co.	Commercial/Industrial	1874	Corner of Manse and Princes Streets, Dunedin	
Business premises for Craig and Gillies	Commercial/Industrial	1874	George Street, Dunedin	Demolished in 1979.
Cottage	Residential	1874	Mornington, Dunedin	Five-roomed.
Cottage	Residential	1874	Moray Place, Dunedin	Known as Carnegie Cottage. Still exists as of August 2012.
Craig & Gillies building	Commercial/Industrial	1874	George Street, Dunedin, Dunedin	This three-storey building was partly constructed of Oamaru stone, on a base of Port Chalmers bluestone, with a brick superstructure with a cement finish. Demolished in the late 1960s, its site is now occupied by part of Dunedin Civic Centre.
Erection of 90 ft high chimney for A. L. Smith & Co. patent brick works	Commercial/Industrial	1874	Hillside, Dunedin	
Extensions to business premises for G. M. Aldrich	Commercial/Industrial	1874	Dowling Street, Dunedin	
Extensions to Union Permanent and Investment Society building	Commercial/Industrial	1874	Dowling, Dunedin	
Goods sheds for New Zealand Loan and Mercantile Agency Company	Commercial/Industrial	1874	Beach Street, Port Chalmers	The building was later occupied by Shaw Savill and Albion.
House	Residential	1874	Royal Street, Dunedin	
House "Alyth" for Keith Ramsay	Residential	1874	34 Royal Street, Dunedin	Still existing. Granted Heritage New Zealand historic place category 2 status in 1986.
House for J. McHerron	Residential	1874	Shringley Bank	
Port Chalmers Holy Trinity Anglican Church	Ecclesiastical	1874	Corner of 1 Scotia and Grey Streets, Port Chalmers	Exist operates as a church. Granted Heritage New Zealand historic place category 1 status in 1982.
Shop and dwelling for W. Bremner, tinsmith	Commercial/Industrial	1874	Northeast corner of Frederick and George Streets, Dunedin	
Stables and outhouses for D. F. Main	Residential	1874	Unknown	
School and Schoolmaster's House, Purakaunui	Education	1874	Purakaunui Road, Purakaunui	Still exists as of August 2012.
Schoolhouse, Green Island	Education	1874	Green Island, Dunedin	
Stable for Guthrie and Larnach	Commercial/Industrial	1874	Unknown	25-stall brick building.
Teachers Residence	Residential	1874	Purakaunui	
Union Bank of Australia	Bank	1874	Corner of Liverpool and Princes Street, Dunedin	Palladian, similar to the National Bank in Oamaru. Later ANZ Bank. As of 2013 it was a nightclub. Granted Heritage New Zealand historic place category 2 status in 2005.
Warehouse and residence for R. Blackadder, merchant	Commercial/Industrial	1874	Upper Octagon, Dunedin	
Warehouse for G. F. Reid	Commercial/Industrial	1874	13 Stafford Street, Dunedin	
Warehouse and Workshop	Commercial/Industrial	1874	Off Princes Street, Dunedin	Unknown client.
Bank of New Zealand, Arrowtown	Bank	1875	49 Buckingham Street, Arrowtown	Now part of the Lake District Museum. Granted Heritage New Zealand historic place category 2 status in 2013.
Bank of New Zealand, Clinton	Bank	1875	Clinton	
Bank of New Zealand, Mataura	Bank	1875	Mataura	
Bank of New Zealand, Mosgiel	Bank	1875	Mosgiel	
Bank of New Zealand, Outram	Bank	1875	Outram	
House	Residential	1875	Moray Place, Dunedin	Constructed of brick or concrete.
House for C. Ziele	Residential	1875	Smith Street, Dunedin	
House for Dr Borrows	Residential	1875	Albert Street (now 325 Upper Stuart Street), Dunedin	This substantial Palladian style tow-storey brick villa was the second house that Lawson designed for Borrows. It Still exists as of August 2012 and has been restored.
House for George Young	Residential	1875	Heriot Row, Dunedin	
House for J. Eva	Residential	1875	385 Leith Street, Dunedin	
House for Walter Hislop	Residential	1875	859 George Street, Dunedin	Still exists as of August 2012.
Mission Schoolhouse, Brown Street	Education	1875	Brown Street, Dunedin	
Crown Hotel	Hotel	1875	Balclutha	
Lawrence Town Hall	Civic/Institutional	1875	Lawrence	Only the ground floor still exists as of August 2012.
Otago Grand Hotel	Hotel	1875	Corner of Princes and Rattray Streets, Dunedin	
Port Molyneux Presbyterian Church	Ecclesiastical	1875	Port Molyneux	The church was later relocated to Kaka Point, where it still exists as of August 2012.
St George's Anglican Church	Ecclesiastical	1875	46 Derwent Street, Naseby	It was the first place of worship to be built of concrete in New Zealand. Still exists as of August 2012. Granted Heritage New Zealand historic place category 2 status in 2011.
St Michael's and All Angels Anglican Church	Ecclesiastical	1875	Clyde	Still exists as of September 2023. The building is now privately owned.
Shop and dwelling house	Commercial/Industrial	1875	Balclutha	Unknown client.
Store and dwelling house for G. W. Hutchins	Commercial/Industrial	1875	Balclutha	
Bank of New Zealand, Naseby	Bank	1876	Naseby	
Building	Commercial/Industrial	1876	South Musselburgh, Dunedin	Three-storey. Unknown client.
Building for South British Insurance Company	Commercial/Industrial	1876	Liverpool Street, Dunedin	
Business premises	Commercial/Industrial	1876	George Street, Dunedin	Unknown client.
Extension to offices for McLean Brothers	Commercial/Industrial	1876	Manse Street, Dunedin	
House	Residential	1876	Cargill Street, Dunedin	Eight roomed. Still may exist at no. 106.
House	Residential	1876	Newington, Dunedin	
House for Mrs Duthie	Residential	1876	Tokomairiro (Milton)	
Knox Church, Dunedin	Ecclesiastical	1876	453–463 George Street, Dunedin	Construction commenced in 1874. Granted Heritage New Zealand historic place category 1 status in 1987.
Larnach Castle	Residential	1876	Camp Road, Otago Peninsula	Construction commenced in 1873. In 1874 the family moved in, but the lower apartments were not finished in 1875 and the main shell was completed in 1876. Granted Heritage New Zealand historic place category 1 status in 1988.
Trinity Presbyterian Church	Ecclesiastical	1876	Timaru	
Warehouse	Commercial/Industrial	1876	High Street, Dunedin	Four-storey stone and brick.
Warehouse for Charles Moore	Commercial/Industrial	1876	High Street, Dunedin	
Bank of New Zealand, Dunedin	Bank	1877	Corner of George, London and Pitt Streets, Dunedin	Timber construction. Now demolished.
Beissel's Saloon	Commercial/Industrial	1877	Princes Street, on the west side between Dowling and Rattray, Dunedin	Built for Franz Beissel, hairdresser and perfumer.
Cottages	Residential	1877	Musselburgh, Dunedin	
House	Residential	1877	near Mornington, Dunedin	Of brick construction.
Houses (2 off)	Residential	1877	Arthur Street, Dunedin	
Otago Harbour Board Offices	Civic/Institutional	1877	Vogel Street, Dunedin	
Presbyterian Mission Church	Ecclesiastical	1877	St Kilda, Dunedin	
Shamrock Hotel	Hotel	1877	Corner of Maclaggan and Rattray Streets, Dunedin	It is now the site of the Speight's Ale House.
St Mary's Anglican Church	Ecclesiastical	1877	Portobello, Otago Peninsula	
Store and dwelling house for John Cameron	Commercial/Industrial	1877	Maori Hill, Dunedin	
Warehouse for David Proudfoot	Commercial/Industrial	1877	Corner of Burlington, Dowling and Lower High Streets, Dunedin	Demolished in 1986.
Albion Brewery for Marshall and Copeland	Commercial/Industrial	1878	Dunedin	
Alterations to business premises for Alex Hunter	Commercial/Industrial	1878	Great King Street, Dunedin	
Business premises for James Scott	Commercial/Industrial	1878	Vogel Street, Dunedin	
Chimney for Kaikorai Woollen Company	Commercial/Industrial	1878	Dunedin	Constructed of brick.
Cottage	Residential	1878	Canongate, Dunedin	Five-roomed.
Enfield Presbyterian Church	Ecclesiastical	1878	805 Weston-Ngapara Road, Enfield	Granted Heritage New Zealand historic place category 2 status in 1983.
Fergusson and Mitchell Building	Commercial/Industrial	1878	off Princes Street, Dunedin	
Fire Station	Civic/Institutional	1878	Harrop Street, Dunedin	Demolished in 1964.
Hotel for James Gray	Hotel	1878	Kaitangata	
House	Residential	1878	43 Moray Place, Dunedin	Two- storey. It was later the location of The Asian Restaurant. Still exists as of August 2012.
House	Residential	1878	Forth (now Warrender Street), Dunedin	Five-roomed.
Stables	Residential	1878	Royal Terrace, Dunedin	
Temporary Lunatic Asylum Building	Civic/Institutional	1878	Seacliff	Despite difficulties with the land stability the building served to accommodate patients throughout the life of the main hospital and still existed as late as 1988.
Bank of New Zealand, Port Chalmers	Bank	1879	Corner of Gray and George Streets, Port Chalmers	Still exists as of August 2012.
House for Walter Guthrie	Residential	1879	Corner of Forbury Road and Valpy Street, Dunedin	
Maungatua/West Taieri Presbyterian Church	Ecclesiastical	1879	Maungatua	
Post Office and Government Building, Timaru	Civic/Institutional	1879	Timaru	This was a reduced version of his design for the Dunedin Town Hall. It still exists as of 2013, but without its original clock tower.
Royal Exchange Hotel	Hotel	1879	Lower High Street, Dunedin	It was later used by the Standard Insurance Company. Demolished in 1966.
Shop and residence	Commercial/Industrial	1879	St Andrew Street, Dunedin	
The Otago Corn and Wool Exchange Building	Commercial/Industrial	1879	Corner of Dowling Street and Lower High (now Burlington) Street, Dunedin	Later renamed the Commerce Building. Still exists as of August 2012. Granted Heritage New Zealand historic place category 2 status in 1986.
Bing Harris Company building	Commercial	1880	High Street, Dunedin	Construction commenced in 1868.
Business premises	Commercial/Industrial	1880	Princes Street, Dunedin	Unknown client.
Business premises for New Zealand Loan and Mercantile Agency Company	Commercial/Industrial	1880	Rattray Street, Dunedin	Still exists as of August 2012.
New rooms for the YMCA	Civic/Institutional	1880	Moray Place, Dunedin	
Brown, Ewing and Company building	Commercial	1882	Manse Street, Dunedin	Warehouse.
Dunedin Town Hall	Civic/Institutional	1880	Dunedin	Construction commenced in 1878.
House for Alex McGaw	Residential	1881	Waiwera, Clutha District	
House for Dr Richardson	Residential	1881	Glen Road, Dunedin	
Larnach Mausoleum	Other ecclesiastical	1881	Dunedin Northern Cemetery, Dunedin	
Offices for Keith Ramsay and Henry Guthrie	Commercial/Industrial	1880	135 Cumberland Street extension, Dunedin	
The Tabernacle – Church of Christ	Ecclesiastical	1880	Great King Street, Dunedin	
East Gore Presbyterian Church	Ecclesiastical	1881	6 Rock Street, East Gore, Gore	Is in the process of being converted into an arts centre. Granted Heritage New Zealand historic place category 2 status in 2013.
Mornington Presbyterian Church	Ecclesiastical	1881	33 Brunel Street, Mornington, Dunedin	The last service was held in 2008 and it was subsequently converted to a private residence. Granted Heritage New Zealand historic place category 2 status in 2017.
Riversdale Presbyterian Church	Ecclesiastical	1881	Riverdale	
Roslyn Borough Council Hall	Civic/Institutional	1881	Dunedin	
Alterations for building for Ross, McNeill & Co.	Commercial/Industrial	1882	Dunedin	
Business premises for W. and G. Turnbull	Commercial/Industrial	1882	High Street, Dunedin	
Extensions tor Speight's Brewery	Commercial/Industrial	1882	Rattray Street, Dunedin	This was the malthouse. The original four floor structure that Lawson designed was later increased in height by another two floors.
Gymnasium for Otago Boys High School	Education	1882	Dunedin	Constructed on the grounds of the asylum.
House	Residential	1882	Belleknowes, Dunedin	
Kaihiku Presbyterian Church	Ecclesiastical	1882	Kaihiku, South Otago	Constructed of timber with a slate roof.
Mackerras and Hazlett Bonded Store	Commercial/Industrial	1882	Crawford Street, Dunedin	
Martin & Watson's building	Commercial	1882	corner of The Octagon and lower Stuart Street, Dunedin	Now the Bacchus building (1882).
Offices for Martin and Watson	Commercial/Industrial	1882	Corner of Lower Stuart Street and Octagon, Dunedin	Later occupied by the ANZ Bank and then a wine bar and restaurant as of 2013.
Shop and dwelling	Commercial/Industrial	1882	St Clair, Forbury, Dunedin	
Warehouse for Brown Ewing & Co.	Commercial/Industrial	1882	Manse Street, Dunedin	
Wool and Grain Store and Offices for McLean & Co.	Commercial/Industrial	1882	Bond and Crawford Streets, Dunedin	
Bank of New South Wales	Bank	1883	9 Thames Street, Oamaru	Now the Forrester Gallery. Palladian. Granted Heritage New Zealand historic place category 1 status in 1987.
House for G. E. Tennet	Residential	1883	Mornington, Dunedin	
The Royal Hotel	Hotel	1883	808 Great King Street, Dunedin	Still exists as of August 2012.
Wyndham Presbyterian Church	Ecclesiastical	1883	Wyndham	
Car sheds for Dunedin City and Suburban Tramways Company	Commercial/Industrial	1884	Cumberland Street, Dunedin	
House	Residential	1884	Forbury	
House for Henry Reunert	Residential	1884	Balclutha	Still exists, but heavily altered.
House for medical superintendent	Residential	1884	Seacliff Lunatic Asylum	
House for Otago Acclimatisation Society manager	Residential	1884	Opoho, Dunedin	
Seacliff Lunatic Asylum	Civic/Institutional	1884	22, 36 Russell Road and Coast Road, Seacliff	Gothic. Construction commenced in 1878. Although Lawson's building has long since been demolished the site was granted Heritage New Zealand historic place category 1 status in 2012.
Malloch's Store		1885	Cumberland Street, Dunedin	Still exists as of August 2012 and is occupied by the Good earth Café.
Congregational Church	Ecclesiastical	1885	178 Forbury Road, Dunedin	Now the Reformed Church of Dunedin.
Otago Boys' High School		1885	2 Arthur Street, Dunedin	Construction started in 1982. Now known as the "Tower Block" and still in use. Granted Heritage New Zealand historic place category 1 status in 1984.
Business premises for G. and T. Young	Commercial/Industrial	1886	Princes Street, Dunedin	
Garrison Hall	Civic/Institutional	1886	Corner of Grey and High Streets, Timaru	It featured laminated timber trusses which covered a large span with a fixing system that allowed for movement of the whole roof structure. Still exists as of August 2012.
Lawrence Presbyterian Church	Ecclesiastical	1886	7 Colonsay Street, Lawrence	It is now a private residence. Granted Heritage New Zealand historic place category 2 status in 2004.
Looseboxes at Forbury Park Racecourse	Commercial/Industrial	1886	Dunedin	
Offices for the James McDonald cement factory	Commercial/Industrial	1886	Corner of Cumberland, Water and Vogel Streets, Dunedin	Still exists and as of August 2012 it was called Vogel House.
Cellar at J. Hopkins Tramway Restaurant	Commercial/Industrial	1887	Rattray Street, Dunedin	
House for Carlton	Residential	1887	Ratanui, near Owaka	The date of completion is uncertain.
House for Chappell	Residential	1887	Unknown	
House for H. McKenzie	Residential	1887	Kaitangata	
Store	Commercial/Industrial	1887	Unknown	Unknown client.
House for Hugh Fraser	Residential	1888	Green Valley, Palmerston	
House for James Durie	Residential	1888	Montpellier (now 502 Queen's Drive), Dunedin	
House for James Hendry	Residential	1888	98 Albany Street, Dunedin	Still exists as of August 2012.
House for John Hutton	Residential	1888	Fortrose, Southland	
House for William Wilson	Residential	1888	Grosvenor Street, Kensington, Dunedin	
Repairs to concrete dam for Inch Valley Flour Mill	Commercial/Industrial	1888	near Palmerston	
Cheese factory building for J. Duncan	Commercial/Industrial	1889	Palmerston	
Grain and Wool Stores for Reid, McLean & Co.	Commercial/Industrial	1889	Bounded by Cumberland, Jetty and Vogel Streets, Dunedin	Later occupied by Dalgety & Co, and as of 2013 occupied by Carpet Court.
House	Residential	1889	Roslyn, Dunedin	
House for G. A. Mackisack	Residential	1889	Montpellier (now 504 Queen's Drive), Dunedin	
Tokomairiro Presbyterian Church		1889	30–34 Union Street, Milton	Granted Heritage New Zealand historic place category 1 status in 2008.
Earlsbrae Hall		1890	Essendon, Victoria, Australia	Designed while he was in partnership as Lawson and Grey. In 1920 became Lowther Hall Anglican Grammar School, a private girls school.
Camberwell Hotel and shops	Hotel	1891	Camberwell, Victoria, Australia	
Farmhouse	Residential	1891	Lauriston, Victoria, Australia	
Shop, bakehouse and dwelling	Commercial/Industrial	1891	Camberwell, Melbourne, Australia	
Hearn's building	Commercial/Industrial	1892	Brunswick, Victoria, Australia	Designed by Lawson and Grey.
Presbyterian Shire of Wellington	Ecclesiastical	1895	Yarram, Victoria, Australia	Now St Andrew's Uniting Church.
Presbyterian College Church	Ecclesiastical	1898	149 Royal Parade, Parkville, Melbourne, Australia	
St John's Presbyterian Church	Ecclesiastical	1898	Kite Street, Orange, Australia	Now St John's Uniting Church.
Warehouse and offices for Moran and Cato	Commercial/Industrial	1898	Brunswick Street, Fitzroy, Victoria, Australia	Designed by Lawson and Grey. Still exists as of 2013.
House	Residential	1900	York Place, Dunedin	Designed by the partnership of Lawson & Salmond, but to which a specific partner cannot be attributed.
Alterations to business premises of Phoenix Company	Commercial/Industrial	1901	Maclaggan Street, Dunedin	Designed by Lawson and Salmond.
Houses (2 off)	Residential	1901	Manor Place, Dunedin	Designed by the partnership of Lawson & Salmond, but to which a specific partner cannot be attributed.
House	Residential	1901	Union Street, Dunedin	Designed by the partnership of Lawson & Salmond, but to which a specific partner cannot be attributed.
House	Residential	1901	High Street (now Highgate), Dunedin	Designed by the partnership of Lawson & Salmond, but to which a specific partner cannot be attributed.
House	Residential	1901	Constitution Street, Dunedin	Designed by the partnership of Lawson & Salmond, but to which a specific partner cannot be attributed.
House	Residential	1901	Clerk Street, Dunedin	Designed by the partnership of Lawson & Salmond, but to which a specific partner cannot be attributed.
House	Residential	1901	Crookston, Clutha District	Designed by the partnership of Lawson & Salmond, but to which a specific partner cannot be attributed.
House	Residential	1901	Andersons Bay, Dunedin	Designed by the partnership of Lawson & Salmond, but to which a specific partner cannot be attributed.
Houses (2 off)	Residential	1901	Caversham, Dunedin	Designed by the partnership of Lawson & Salmond, but to which a specific partner cannot be attributed.
Houses (5 off)	Residential	1901	Market Street, Dunedin	Terrace houses. Designed by the partnership of Lawson & Salmond, but to which a specific partner cannot be attributed.
St Enoch's Presbyterian Church	Ecclesiastical	1901	Alexandra	Lawson designed additions and alterations to this existing church. Still exists as of september 2023.
McKenzie Memorial Cairn		1902	Pakihiwaitahi, Horse Range, Waitaki District	This 19.2m high cairn which honoured Sir John Mackenzie was constructed of unhewn stone. This is Lawson's last completed work. It fell into despair, collapsed in 1913 and was replaced by another on top of Puketapu, near Palmerston.

Unless they are significant, alterations to existing houses are not listed.
