= Ada Paterson =

New Zealand school medical doctor (1880–1937)

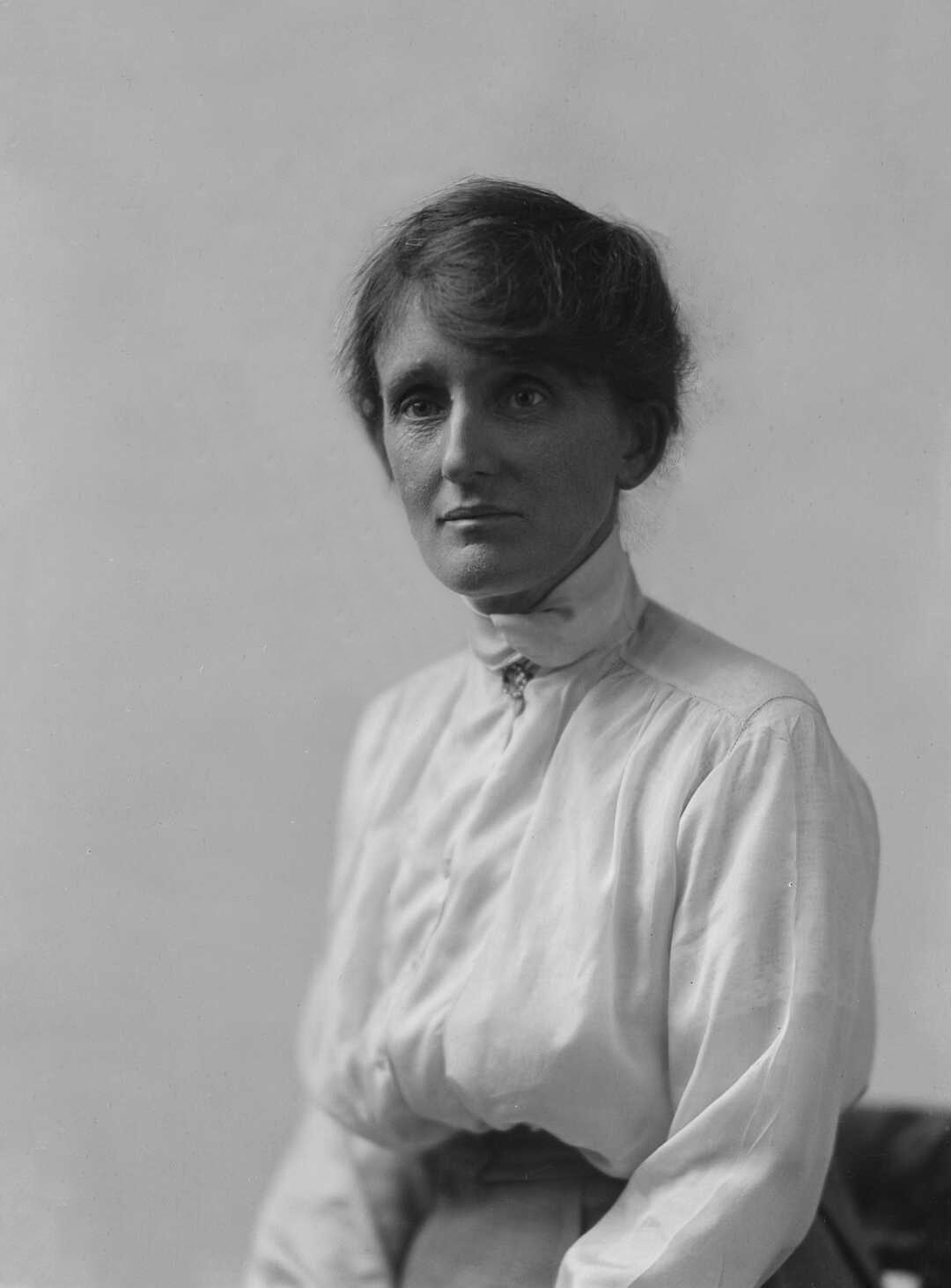
- Born: Ada Gertrude Paterson; 6 June 1880; Dunedin, New Zealand
- Died: 26 August 1937 (aged 57); Wellington, New Zealand
- Occupation: Health administrator
- Years active: 1908–1936
- Medical career
- Profession: Doctor
- Field: Paediatrics

Ada Gertrude Paterson (6 June 1880 – 26 August 1937) was a New Zealand school medical doctor, child health administrator and community worker.

== Early life and education ==
Paterson was born in Dunedin, New Zealand, in 1880. Her father was librarian at the Dunedin Athenaeum and Mechanics' Institute. Paterson attended Otago Girls' High School where she graduates as dux in 1898. She then went on to study medicine at the University of Otago, graduating in 1906 . Patterson then travelled to the University of Dublin for further training, completing a licentiate in midwifery in 1908.

== Career ==
She returned to New Zealand and commenced practising medicine in Picton in 1908. Paterson was appointed a Medical Inspector of Schools in 1912, initially based in Dunedin but then in Wellington from 1916. She was one of the four women doctors in the School Medical Service: the others were Dr Margaret McCahon in Auckland, Dr Eleanor McLaglan in Christchurch and Dr Emily Irwin in Dunedin. In 1923 Paterson was promoted to Director of the School Hygiene Division of the Department of Health.During her time in these positions, Paterson developed an in interest in child mental and physical health, particularly the disproportionate impact on girls. In 1921 she took a years sabbatical to further research child health in Australia, Britain and North America.

In 1935 Paterson represented New Zealand at a conference associated with the League of Nations held in Geneva.

She was dedicated to working for the welfare of children. Her obituary recorded that 'her wise and sympathetic handling of many of the problems of childhood earned her the esteem and affection of many generations of school children and their parents, as well as the confidence of the educational authorities'.

== Community activities ==
Paterson was the first chairperson of the Wellington District Children's Health Camp Association and was influential in the running of the Ōtaki Children's Health Camp. She was also involved with the kindergarten movement. She was a member of the New Zealand Women's University Federation and served on that organisation's committee.

== Death and funeral ==
Paterson was diagnosed with cancer in 1936 and underwent a mastectomy but died on 26 August 1937 in Wellington. Her funeral and cremation were held on 28 August 1937. Her pallbearers included the Minister of Health Peter Fraser, the Director General of Health Michael Watt, the Director-General, Mental Hospitals Department Dr T. Gray and the Director of Education T. N. Lambourne. Her ashes are buried at her family plot in the Northern Cemetery in Dunedin.
