= East Gore Presbyterian Church =

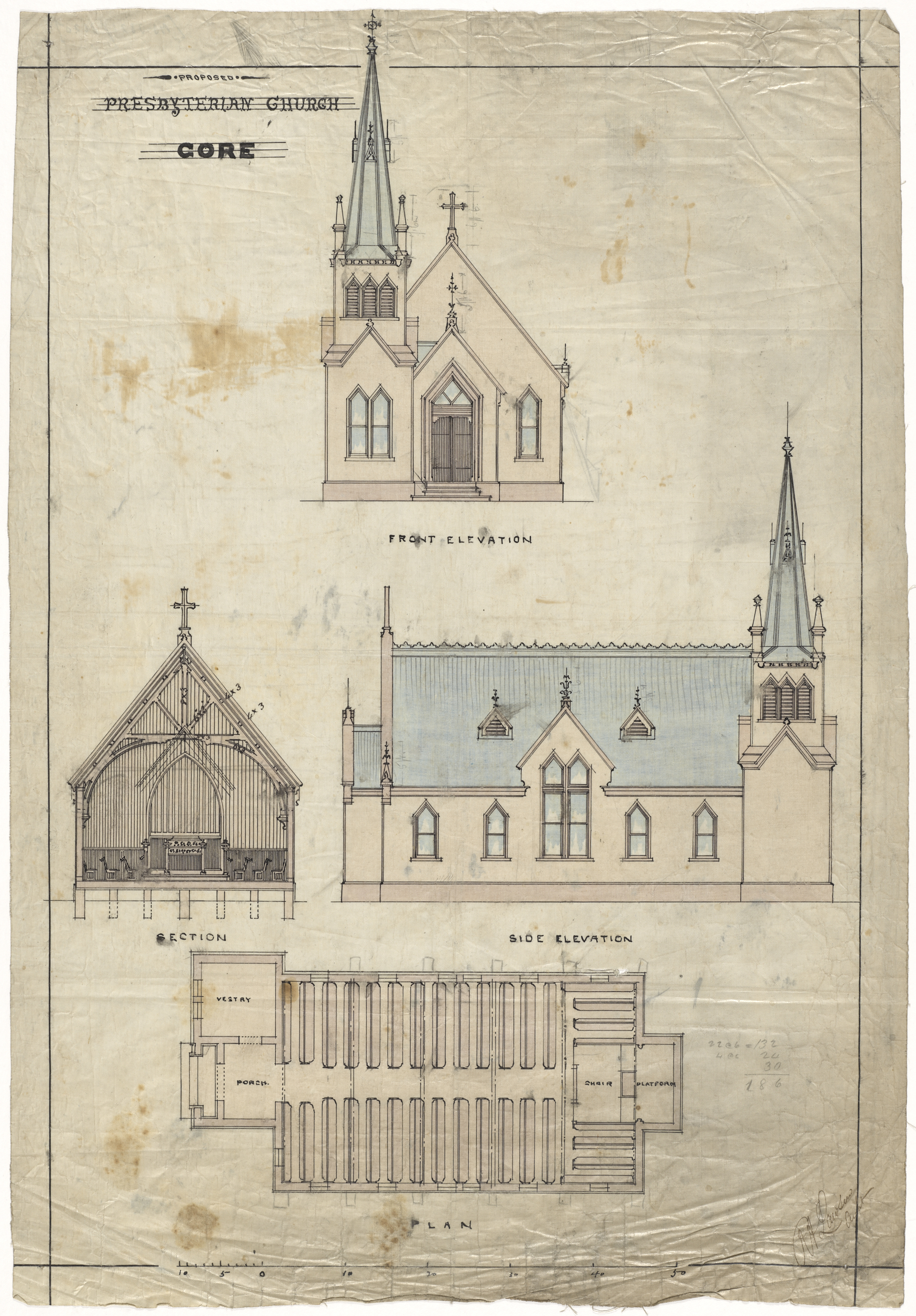
- Architectural plans of East Gore Presbyterian Church by R. A. Lawson
- East Gore Presbyterian Church
- 46°05′52″S 168°57′08″E
- Address: 6 Rock Street, Gore
- Country: New Zealand
- Previous denomination: Presbyterian

History
- Status: Church (1881 – 1995); Arts centre (since 2001)
- Dedicated: 16 October 1881

Architecture
- Functional status: Church closed and sold; Preserved; repurposed
- Architect: R. A. Lawson
- Architectural type: Church
- Years built: 1881
- Closed: 1995

Specifications
- Materials: Timber

Heritage New Zealand – Category 2
- Official name: Gore Presbyterian Church (Former)
- Designated: 2 May 2013
- Reference no.: 2530

East Gore Presbyterian Church is a former Presbyterian church located in Gore, New Zealand. It is located on a bluff overlooking the eastern side of the Mataura River.

Opened in 1881 as the Gore Presbyterian Church it was the town's primary Presbyterian church until following expansion of the town on the western side of the river lead to services commencing in the more central St Andrew's Church Hall and later at St Andrew's Church. This resulted in it being relegated to serving the needs of East Gore. Designed by Robert Lawson the building is regarded as one of his most impressive wooden churches and is listed by Heritage New Zealand as a Category 2 structure. It closed as a place of Presbyterian worship in 1995 and is in the process of being converted into an art centre.

== History ==
=== The Presbyterian Church in Southland ===
Following on the heels of the establishment of a Free Church settlement in Dunedin, the Presbyterian Church expanded its mantle into southern districts. As the European population increased the residents of the Mataura Valley and Tapanui were sufficient in number in 1862 to petition the Presbytery regarding a minister for their district. In response the Reverend James Urie was allocated to what was called the Pomahaka-Mataura Valley parish. By the early 1870s the Mataura Valley was separated out and given to the Reverend James Henry. His parish was 97 kilometres (60 mi) long and at its widest 48 kilometres (30 mi) broad.

In 1877 Rev J. M. Davidson was inducted at Mataura and conducted services on alternate Sundays at Gordon (now called East Gore) in a private house, and later in Mackay's Hall, where Sunday School was also held. Following the subdivision of Knapdale Station more settlers were attracted to the area. Gordon (East Gore) was surveyed in 1877, with sections auctioned in October 1878, which induced a flurry of construction – three stores, two hotels, and a bank opening in quick succession. Gore’s first religious services were first held in the house of John Neill and later in Mackay’s Hall both in Gordon followed by Sunday school services occurring in the same hall from at least as early as August 1880. The school was to grow to 40 pupils by 1881. The Sunday School was established by Andrew Aitken and initially had 11 pupils and two teachers. The growth of Gordon combined with many of the leading members of the Presbyterian community such as Andrew Aitkin and John MacGibbon either living or having businesses in Gordon inclined the community towards constructing a church on the eastern rather than the western side of the river.

As a result a congregational meeting was held in Mackay's Hall in June 1880 to discuss the construction of a church. The meeting agreed that a church be built on Section 3, Block XI on Rock Street, and that the committee procure plans for a church to seat 200. Chaired by the Rev J.M. Davidson the committee consisted of Andrew Aitken, Alexander Brown, David Dun, Robert Dunlop, John MacGibbon, Alexander MacKay, John MacKay. John Robertson and John Nelson Scott.

The terrace on which the proposed church was to stand was known by local Maori as Ōnuku, a place where a lament was composed by a hunter mourning the death of his wife and family in a heavy snowstorm. Historically, this area was a popular camp and processing site for taramea (speargrass), an ingredient used in many Maori perfume recipes. This elevated terrace was described as "the finest site for a church edifice in the neighbourhood"’ and "one of the finest sites in Otago" – where a ”visible church may be seen nearly from Riversdale to Invercargill".

The clerk of the congregation, David Dunn wrote on 22 June 1880 to prominent Dunedin architect Robert Lawson:

The Presbyterian congregation here have agreed to erect a church to seat, say. 200 people, and I am asked to request you to furnish a plan for their consideration. The site is the finest this City of the Valley can boast of, on the summit of a rising ground at the east end of the Railway bridge where a visible church may be seen nearly from Riversdale to Invercargill. An idea exists that the purse strings may be razed [stretched] to the tune of, say £300, a sum you will doubtless set down as small, but mind you, we are as yet a "feeble folk" among the hills, and if we can now make room for 200, should more come by and by and think of putting "eek" [extension] on the hive they will just have to bring the money with them ... I think they would all like to see a bit of a steeple and to hear 'clinkum bell wi' rattling tow' call them up on Sabbath Morning: my only fear is that the sum named will not allow you to go further than something severely Presbyterian in style, but not so much as I hope our early acquaintances of Burgher and anti-Burgher, Relief Secession and Kirk specimens of architecture still visible in some parts of our native country.

— David Dunn.

Lawson took on the commission, replying on 25 June with a drawing of what he proposed and suggesting that the congregation apply to the Synod for a £200 grant to assist with the cost. When he submitted his plans he stated that the design "exactly comes up to your requirements as to interior accommodation being arranged for 200 people. The seats might, however, be arranged differently, that is, having a passage in the centre on place of at the side, and so a few more could be accommodated."

Lawson's plans were adopted with some alterations. It was agreed that the vestry should be cut off from one end and a fairly substantial belfry added at the other. The cost was not to exceed that of £425 for a similar church that had been constructed at Waipori. Specifications called for totara to be used for the piles and seasoned red pine for some of the work. However, as cost was a major consideration white pine was used in much of the construction. This decision to use such a soft wood was to haunt future congregations as they struggled to control borer infestations.

=== Construction ===
After some months of wrangling with the factor for the Presbyterian Church in Dunedin, funding disputes were smoothed over and tenders were called by Lawson for construction on 23 February 1881. Ten tenders were received ranging in price from £465 to £1036 with the Presbyterian Church Committee on 7 March 1881 awarding the contract to the lowest tenderer, that of Thomas Latham (1830–1891). Work was underway by 26 March 1881 and by 11 April the frame had been erected. The church's 2cwt bell. arrived and after being temporary hung was rung for the first time at a fund raising auction on 12 August.

On 13 August 1881 while the church was under construction it was reported that "Sunday last will be remembered here as the most stormy day yet witnessed in this part of the country. It rained occasionally, was very cold, and blew an incessant heavy gale, it did considerable damage to the Presbyterian Church, East Gore, and most people were in terror of seeing their places blown down; but fortunately the storm abated when night came and there was no serious damage done". In response to the structural damage Lawson visited the site and agreed to erecting four buttresses and iron cross rods with extra timber and bracing in the tower. In January 1882 it was reported that the church, with extras, had cost about £630, with only about £60 of it being debt.

=== First Services ===
Gore's first Presbyterian church service was held in the church on 16 October 1881. The service was read by Reverend John Ferguson of Invercargill's First Church. The congregation turned to the need for their own minister, starting a Sustentation Fund in the event of Gore district becoming a separate charge. The call was issued in 1884 and the Reverend Andrew Mackay temporary took up the duties in May of that year before being confirmed in September of that year.

After some debate about the morality of instrumental music into worship, an American made Century organ was installed in the church in 1887. Mackay's tenure proved to be short as a number of congregation took exception to his preaching in 1887 and in December of that year petitioned the Southland Presbytery to allow them to set another church in Gore.

We, the undersigned; late and present members and adherents of the Presbyterian Church, and being members of the Presbyterian Church of Otago and Southland, having felt that we have been, and are, unable to worship conscientiously in our own Church, owing to 'our want of confidence in the ability of the minister of the Presbyterian Church to load us in spiritual things, and to supply our spiritual necessities to the lack of our growth in grace….

— The introduction from the petition to the Southland Presbytery in December 1887.

With the Southland Presbytery unwilling to sanction another place of worship the issue remained unresolved with Mackay continuing as minister until resigning in July 1890 to serve in Sydney. It was then that according to some sources a number of some parishioners choose to leave and establish the Congregational Church (which had been established in June 1892). A conflicting source however claims that it was those who supported him that left to join the same church, which they felt offered a freer constitution and a better location. Mackay was replaced by the Rev. J. A. Asher who took office in November 1890. despite a number of people having expressed reservations about his appointment. In any case it was not until 1928 with the opening of St Andrew's Church Hall in 1928 that another Presbyterian place of worship was established in Gore. It then took until 1959 before sufficient funds had been raised to construct a formal place of worship in the form of St Andrew's Church on the Western side of the Mataura.

=== Extension of the church ===
In 1891 the Presbyterian Synod of Otago created a new presbytery district – the Presbytery of Mataura, with Gore as its centre. Almost straight away the new body was confronted with demands from the church committee to extend the church by purchasing the adjoining section and to acquire land on the west side of the river with a view to establishing another church. Once approval was obtained for the extension Invercargill civil engineer and architect, William Sharp (1847–1936) was commissioned to draw up plans to extend the church so that it could accommodate 108 additional seats and to add a session house capable of seating 60-70 people. His solution required cutting through the church, to turn it into transepts and the construction of a new nave, with the session house added at the end where the pulpit stood. The extension which cost £500 was built by L. Brown of Invercargill and with its Lancet windows and simple detailing was in a similar style to Lawson's original. As a result of the extension was church was now capable of seating 270 adults, while the addition of folding seats around the passages could accommodate 60 more.

The official re-opening took place on 7 February 1892. The Reverend Ramsay, speaking at the opening congratulated the congregation on their new church though "he could hardly call it altogether a new church, but it reminded him of the gun which had a new lock, stock and barrel".

With the opening of the Gore railway-road bridge in 1875, the western side of the river began to grow at the expense of the eastern side. By August 1917 the session had a membership of 424. Between the Bible class and Sunday Schools they had a total of 383 young people receiving religious instruction. East Gore was established as a second charge in November 1952, combining East Gore with Waimumu and Te Tipua, and the Church was named the East Gore Presbyterian Church. In 1960 the boundaries changed again, the old parish of East Gore-Waimumu was divided, the country portion going to West Gore. This put East Gore in a difficult position with a declining congregation to look after the church.

In 1962 a major renovation of the church was undertaken with substantial repiling, painting of the spire and roof for the first time since the initial coat in 1881. Roughcast was applied to the foundation cover boards. Work was also at the same time carried out on the interior of the building. In 1964 an adjourning hall, incorporating Sunday School rooms, and a separate manse to the south were constructed. Centenary services were held in the East Gore Church in 1981 and a centenary history was published.

With a declining congregation and the increasing costs of maintaining the building the Presbytery decided to close the East Gore church and a special service to mark its closing was held in June 1998. People were given the choice of either joining Calvin Presbyterian in West Gore or St Andrew in Central Gore, and many did. However a number people from the congregation were keen to keep a Presbyterian style church going in East Gore, and so a group of about 25 started what is now known as the Grace Church which has as its home the old East Gore community hall on Hamilton street. This church continues in good form to this day. As for services in the old East Gore church, after its closure the building was leased to the Gore Apostolic Church for a period.

On 2 May 2013 the church was designated as a Category 2 Historic Place by Heritage New Zealand.

=== Redevelopment into an art centre ===
The Eastern Southland Gallery purchased the church and its attached hall in 2001 with the aim of restoring the building and turning it into an arts centre. This would contain a fully functioning non-profit lithographic studio, a general purpose printmaking studio with etching and woodblock printing facilities, a painting and general purpose studio space, a self-contained flat for visiting artists, a temporary exhibition space. It was also intended to eventually create an art education centre in the main church building. Commencement of the project was however delayed while the gallery concentrated on completion of its $1.3 million John Money Wing and Ralph Hotere Gallery.

By 2009 work had commenced on the project which it was estimated would cost $617,447. An offer from Frans Baetens and Magda van Gils led to upon their future retirement, a 7.5 ton J. Voirin French lithography press (dating from 1874) and other printing equipment being donated to the centre which would for use in the lithographic studio. Baetens and van Gils who moved to New Zealand in 1984 had shipped the press over from Europe for use in their Muka Studio in Auckland's Grey Lynn. The studio has made a significant contribution to New Zealand's art scene in the field of printmaking. Other people have also donated various other presses. As well as the government which made a donation of $110,000 towards the project in 2016, financial support has been received from the Mataura Licensing Trust, Gore District Council, Community Trust of Southland, Presbyterian Synod and numerous other businesses and individuals.

The project was planned to be undertaken in six stages: gutting the existing north-facing wing of the church and building a self-contained flat for a visiting artist in residence in the old Sunday School / Vestry, restoring the exterior of the church by replacing the roof and all of the exterior weatherboards, barge boards and flashings on the north facing walls of the old church building, replicating and replacing the heritage windows, painting of the church, strengthened the floor of the hall to allow installation of the Voirin press, in conjunction with a display foyer and public toilets, restoration of the interior of the church and landscaping of the back garden. Restoration of the church was undertaken under the guidance of heritage architect Jeremy Salmond with the support of structural engineer Peter Stevenson. By August 2020 $600,000 has been raised by the community for the project with the flat on one side of the church completed with only the creation of an art education centre in the church still to undertaken.

As of 2018 there are only twenty Voirin presses of this size remaining in the world.

== Description ==
The church which is cruciform in plan and is constructed of timber, clad in weatherboard, with a corrugated iron roof is located on a rise in East Gore overlooking the Mataura River and the town. The 15.5 m high spire on the south elevation has paired Lancet windows on the ground floor, and a set of triple Lancet windows with louvres on the first floor level. There is a porch and door on the south elevation providing access to a grassed area on what is the rear side of the church. There is little decoration – with the Lancet windows, the spire and the steep roof pitch being the main visual elements. The interior of the nave is lined with wallboard. The main interior detailing comes from the King Post trusses that run across the nave.
