= Tokomairiro Presbyterian Church =

Church in Milton, New Zealand

Coordinates: 46°07′22″S 169°57′25″E

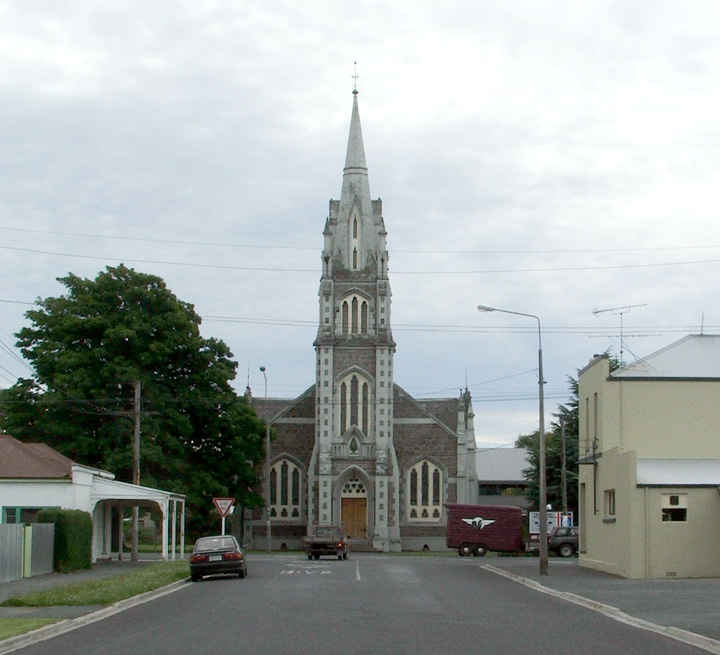
Lawson's impressive church dominates the old road to Fairfax (Tokoiti).

Tokomairiro Presbyterian Church is a church in the New Zealand town of Milton, in the Otago Region. It was designed and built by Robert Lawson and officially opened in 1889.

Presbyterianism was established in Milton early in the town's history, with the first service given by Rev. Dr Thomas Burns on Christmas Day 1851. A dedicated church was built and opened in 1863, at a time when Milton had rapidly grown as a staging post to the goldfields of the Otago gold rush. The church took its name from the Tokomairaro River (formerly called Tokomairiro), which flows close to the town.

== The current building ==
Calls for a larger and more permanent church to be built began in the early 1880s, and a new church, designed by Dunedin architect Robert Lawson and with capacity for 600 people, began later in the decade. The finished edifice, built by J. & W. Gore, was opened on 13 October 1889by Rev. Donald Stuart.

The church is located at the southern end of Milton's CBD, at the junction of the town's main street, Union Street, and Ossian Street, which was formerly a major thoroughfare to the coast via the township of Fairfax (now Tokoiti). The church forms an impressive terminating vista for Ossian Street. The building is listed as a Category 1 historic place by Heritage New Zealand. The listing proposal, in 2008, generated a record number of positive submissions to the then New Zealand Historic Places Trust.

The church is now used as the main place of worship of the Tokomairiro Co-operating Parish of Milton-Waihola, a joint arrangement reached between local Presbyterian and Methodist congregations in 1976.

=== Architecture and construction ===
The church is in the gothic style, with a frontage including a central tower topped by a steeple. Inside, there are short transepts and a rearward extension which houses the church hall. The church is constructed of breccia sourced at Port Chalmers and limestone, with a slate roof. Construction cost £3000.

At the time of its construction, the 32-metre (105 ft) building was reputed to be the tallest building south of Dunedin anywhere in the world. Lawson's original design included a taller spire, but a more truncated one was constructed to keep costs down.

The steeple contains a bell re-cast from the cracked bell of the previous church building. Re-casting was completed in time for the 1889 building's inauguration.
