= East Taieri =

- Settlement
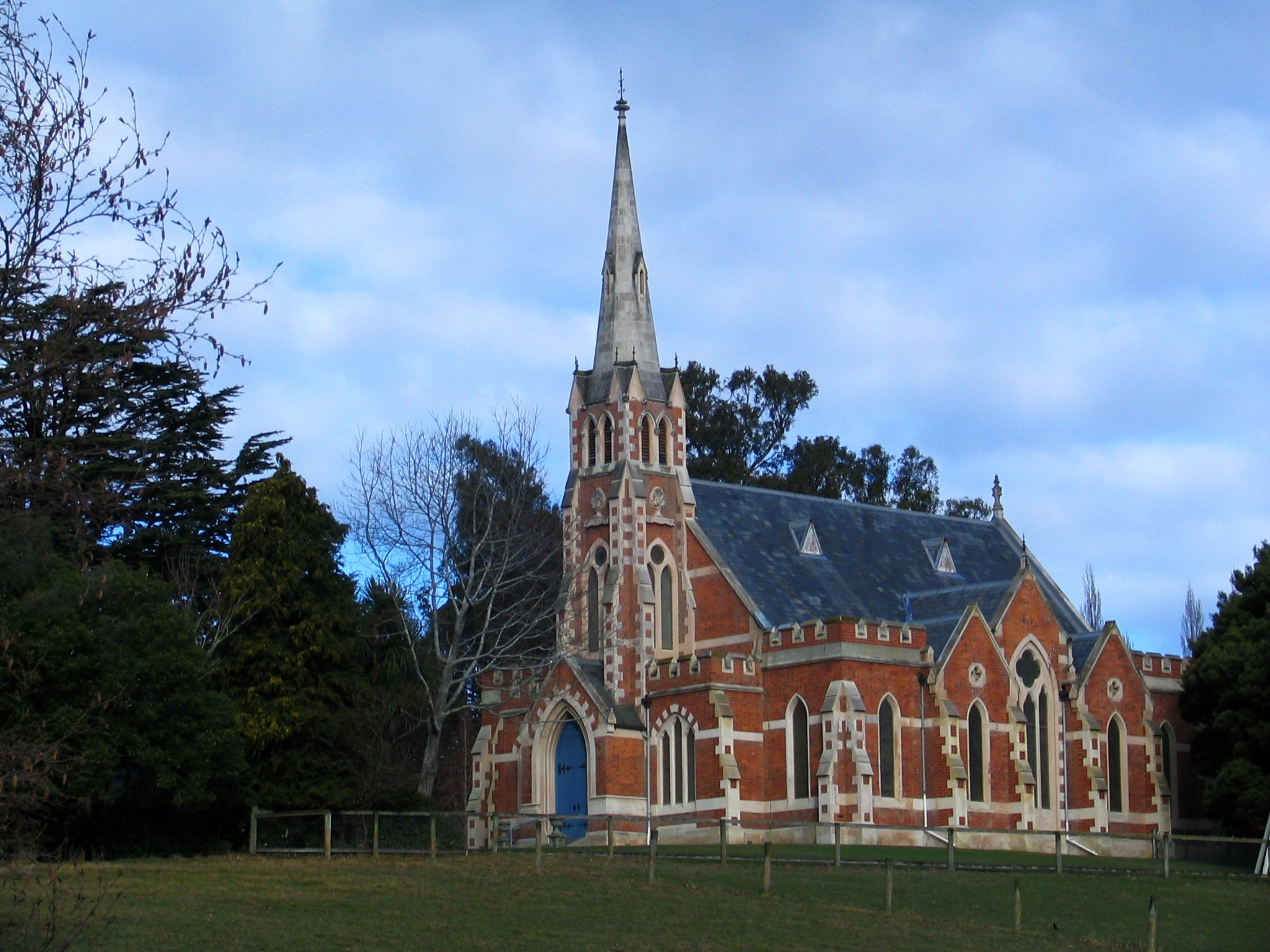
- East Taieri Presbyterian Church
- Interactive map of East Taieri
- Coordinates: 45°53′55″S 170°20′0″E
- Country: New Zealand
- Island: South Island
- Region: Otago
- District: Dunedin
- Community board: Mosgiel-Taieri Community Board
- Electorates: Taieri; Te Tai Tonga (Māori)

Government
  - Territorial authority: Dunedin City Council
  - Regional council: Otago Regional Council
  - Mayor of Dunedin: Sophie Barker
  - Taieri MP: Ingrid Leary
  - Te Tai Tonga MP: Tākuta Ferris

Area
  - Total: 3.13 km^{2} (1.21 sq mi)

Population (June 2025)
  - Total: 2,570
  - Density: 821/km^{2} (2,130/sq mi)
- Time zone: UTC+12 (NZST)
  - Summer (DST): UTC+13 (NZDT)
- Area code: 03
- Local iwi: Ngāi Tahu

East Taieri is a small township, located between Mosgiel and Allanton in New Zealand's Otago region. It lies on State Highway 1 en route between the city of Dunedin and its airport at Momona. It lies close to the southeastern edge of the Taieri Plain, hence its name.

== Demographics ==
East Taieri covers 3.13 km^{2} (1.21 sq mi) and had an estimated population of 2,570 as of June 2025, with a population density of 821 people per km^{2}.

Historical population
Year	Pop.	±% p.a.
2006	1,653	—
2013	1,935	+2.28%
2018	2,181	+2.42%

East Taieri had a population of 2,181 at the 2018 New Zealand census, an increase of 246 people (12.7%) since the 2013 census, and an increase of 528 people (31.9%) since the 2006 census. There were 786 households, comprising 1,107 males and 1,074 females, giving a sex ratio of 1.03 males per female. The median age was 44.8 years (compared with 37.4 years nationally), with 426 people (19.5%) aged under 15 years, 312 (14.3%) aged 15 to 29, 1,089 (49.9%) aged 30 to 64, and 354 (16.2%) aged 65 or older.

Ethnicities were 94.4% European/Pākehā, 6.6% Māori, 1.2% Pasifika, 3.0% Asian, and 1.5% other ethnicities. People may identify with more than one ethnicity.

The percentage of people born overseas was 12.0, compared with 27.1% nationally.

Although some people chose not to answer the census's question about religious affiliation, 53.0% had no religion, 39.6% were Christian, 0.7% were Hindu, 0.4% were Muslim, 0.3% were Buddhist and 1.1% had other religions.

Of those at least 15 years old, 384 (21.9%) people had a bachelor's or higher degree, and 303 (17.3%) people had no formal qualifications. The median income was $43,200, compared with $31,800 nationally. 456 people (26.0%) earned over $70,000 compared to 17.2% nationally. The employment status of those at least 15 was that 993 (56.6%) people were employed full-time, 267 (15.2%) were part-time, and 48 (2.7%) were unemployed.

== Notable buildings ==
The East Taieri Presbyterian Church was designed by Robert Lawson and opened in 1870, replacing an earlier building which had served as both church and school. The church was extended with an administration and fellowship centre in the 1990s.

The Presbyterian Manse was designed by N.Y.A. Wales and built in 1877–78. It was renovated in the late 1970s and again in 2001, and has been the home of the ministers of East Taieri Presbyterian Church.

== Education ==
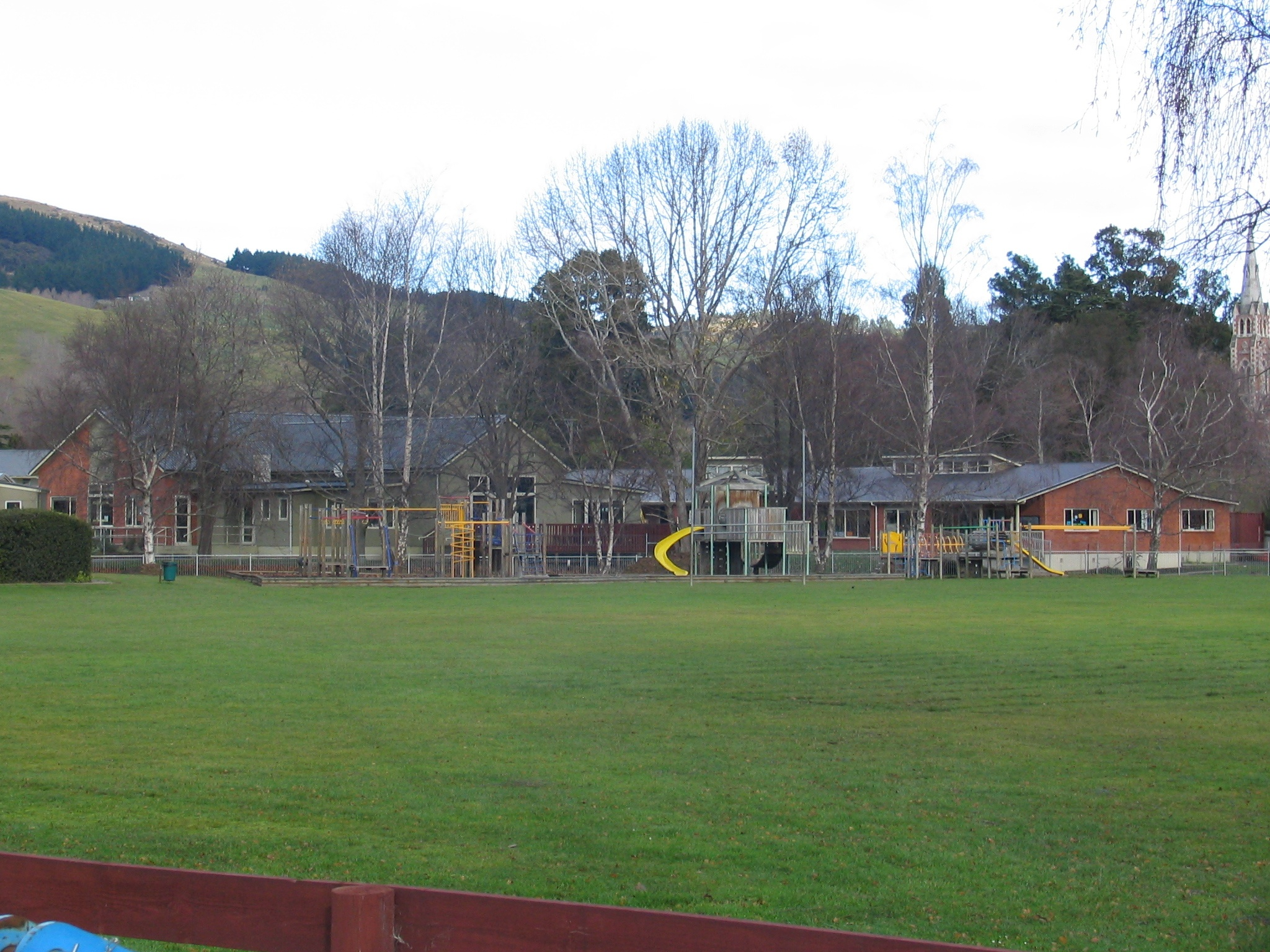
East Taieri School

East Taieri School is a state contributing primary school catering for years 1 to 6. It had a roll of 313 as of July 2026. The school was founded as a preaching station in 1853 and moved to its current location in 1863.
