= Robert Lawson (architect) =

19th-century New Zealand architect (1833–1902)

Robert Arthur Lawson
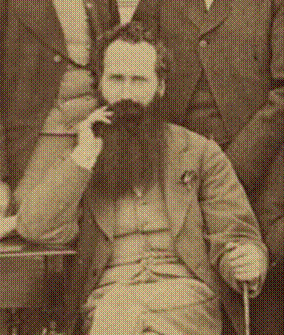
- Robert Arthur Lawson, aged 42
- Born: 1 January 1833; Newburgh, Fife, Scotland
- Died: 3 December 1902; Canterbury, New Zealand
- Occupation: Architect
- Spouse: Jessie Sinclair Hepburn (m. 1864)
- Children: Rachel Ida, James Newburgh, Margaret Lillian, Jessie Lawson
- Parent(s): Margaret and James Lawson
- Buildings: First Church, Dunedin, Knox Church, Dunedin, Otago Boys' High School

Robert Arthur Lawson (1 January 1833 – 3 December 1902) was one of New Zealand's pre-eminent 19th century architects. The Dictionary of New Zealand Biography states that he did more than any other designer to shape the face of the Victorian era architecture of the city of Dunedin. He is the architect of over forty churches, including Dunedin's First Church for which he is best remembered, but also other buildings, such as Larnach Castle, a country house, with which he is also associated.

Born at Newburgh, in Fife, Scotland, he emigrated in 1854 to Australia and then in 1862 to New Zealand. He died aged 69 in Canterbury, New Zealand. Lawson is acclaimed for his work in both the Gothic revival and classical styles of architecture. He was prolific, and while isolated buildings remain in Scotland and Australia, it is in the Dunedin area that most surviving examples can now be found.

Today he is held in high esteem in his adopted country. However, at the time of his death his reputation was at a low ebb following the partial collapse of his Seacliff Lunatic Asylum, at the time New Zealand's largest building. In 1900, shortly before his death, he returned to New Zealand from a self-imposed, ten-year exile to re-establish his name, but his sudden demise prevented a full rehabilitation of his reputation. The great plaudits denied him in his lifetime were not to come until nearly a century after his death, when the glories of Victorian architecture began again to be recognised and appreciated.

== Early life and education ==
Lawson was born on 1 January 1833 at 49 Hoggs Place, Abbyhill in the village of Grange of Lindores in the parish of Abdie near Newburgh, Fife, Scotland. He was the fourth child of Margaret (nee Arthur) and James Lawson, a carpenter and sawmiller. Lawson was educated at the Abdie parish school.

== Career ==
Lawson must have shown an interest in architecture or promise in drawing for he was articled at the age of 15 to architect Andrew Heiton Snr. of Heiton and Heiton in Perth (Scotland). After a short time he was transferred to and completed his apprenticeship under James Gillespie Graham who was a leading architect in Edinburgh. While with Graham he furthered his school education at "Trustees Academy". Lawson then worked as an assistant architect with John Lessels, where he was credited with the design of a college and two mansions.

=== Australia ===
At the age of 21, Lawson armed only with a letter of introduction to one of brother's friend residing in Melbourne he boarded the ship Tongataboo on 15 July 1854, arriving in the city on 1 November in that same year. Like other new arrivals in Australia, he tried many new occupations over the next two years on various goldfields tried goldmining before eventually settling in the town of Steiglitz where as well as remaining involved in gold mining activities he became the agent for the Melbourne newspaper The Argus and for whom it is believed he also acted as its local correspondent. During this period he occasionally turned his hand to architecture, designing the Free Church school and in 1858 a Catholic school. He was also involved in assessing and share broking. By 1859 he was secretary of the Steiglitz Prospecting & Mining Company and then its managing director until it was wound up in late 1861. As Lawson came to realise the low probability of success in the gold rush and the precariousness of and by the end of 1861 had moved to Melbourne with the intention of resuming a full-time career in architecture. In 1861, the first Otago gold rush brought an influx of people to southern New Zealand, including a new generation of emigrants. To service the rapidly expanding population of the region's principal settlement, the 13 year old town of Dunedin the Descon's Court of the presbytery of Otago decided now was the time to build a permanent Presbyterian church to serve as its principal place of worship. In the January 1862 they announced a competition with a prize of £50 to select a suitable design what was to become First Church. Lawson heard about the competition either from his younger brother John Lawson who had already emigrated to Otago or via a copy of the Otago Daily Times that had found their way to Melbourne. He decided to enter the competition and was able to submit from Melbourne a set of drawing under the pseudonym of "Presbyter" by the closing date of 15 March 1862. If this pseudonym was designed to catch the eye of the Presbyterian judges, it was well chosen: his design was successful.

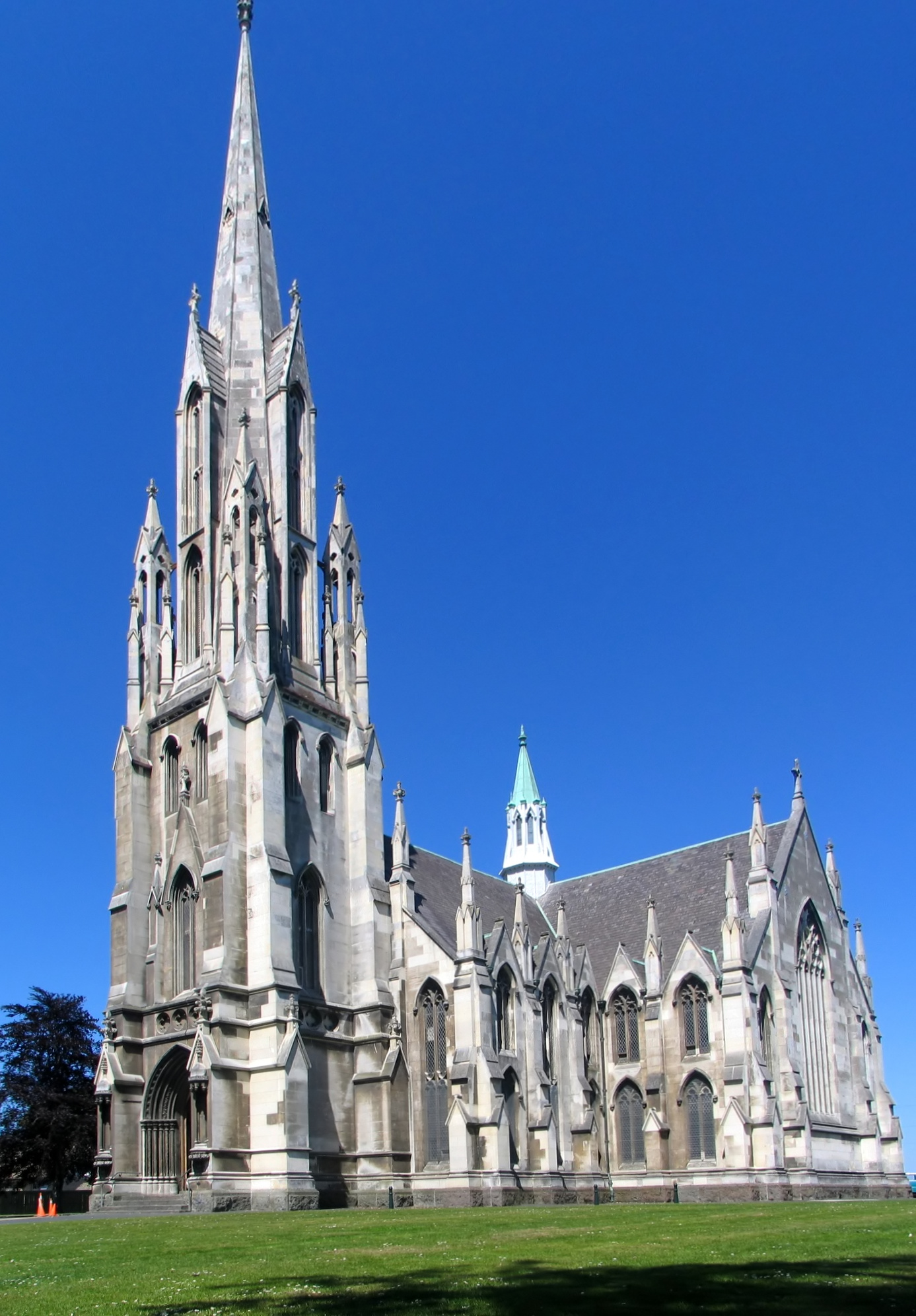
First Church, Dunedin: the principal facade, Lawson's first major work

=== Emigration to New Zealand ===
As a result of winning the commission to design First Church Lawson was able in 1862 to move to Dunedin and open an architectural practice. During the construction of First Church Lawson built up his practice with commissions obtained to design other churches, public buildings, and houses in the vicinity. During the 1870s and 1880s Dunedin rose to be the dominant commercial centre in New Zealand largely due to the wealth generated by gold mining. This was in turn reflected in the number of new buildings being constructed. These commissions ensured that the 1870s in particular were Lawson's most productive. This was despite him suffering from ill health which required him to spend two months in Melbourne in 1873 and later in 1874.

As he had no partners to share the workload his practice employed a number of young architects, including Thomas Forrester, Percy W. Laing and James-Louis Salmond (from 1888) who later went on to establish their own practices. There are no records to suggest that Lawson entered into any partnerships until a brief relationship with Christchurch architect Thomas Lambert in 1889. In 1876 Lawson was involved in the formation of the Dunedin institute of Civil engineers and Architects, which was intended to counter the competition from employees of the Otago Provincial Council eventually went out of existence by the early 1880s.

By the late 1870s following on from the booms bought by the goldfields and then the Vogel Public Works Scheme New Zealand entered a severe economic recession (precipitated by the collapse of the City Bank of Glasgow in 1878) which lasted into the early 1890s and came to be known as the "long depression". In the winters there was visible hardship and distress and people began to leave in particular to Australia, where Melbourne experienced a boom in the 1880s. Dunedin began to stagnate which caused Lawson's commissions to change from commercial and industrial clients to predominantly residential. There were however a number of important commissions, among them churches at Gore (1881), Kaihkiki, Riversdale (1881), an office building for Martin and Watson (1882). A prestigious commission was that for the Otago boy's High School, construction of which commenced in July 1882. His peers were also affected by the lack of work with his Dunedin based rival David Ross as well as Frederick Burrell in Invercargill both departing for Australia.

=== Seacliff Lunatic Asylum ===
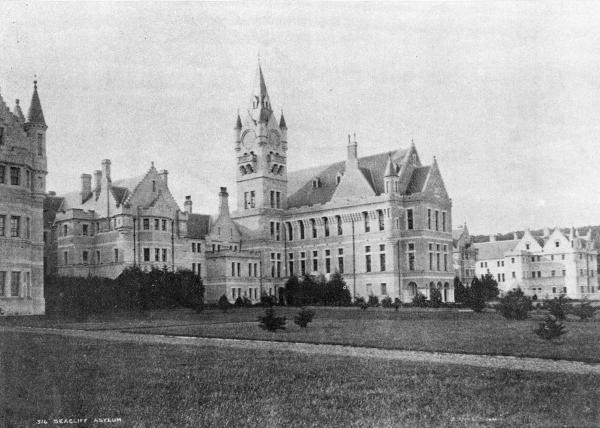
Seacliff Lunatic Asylum

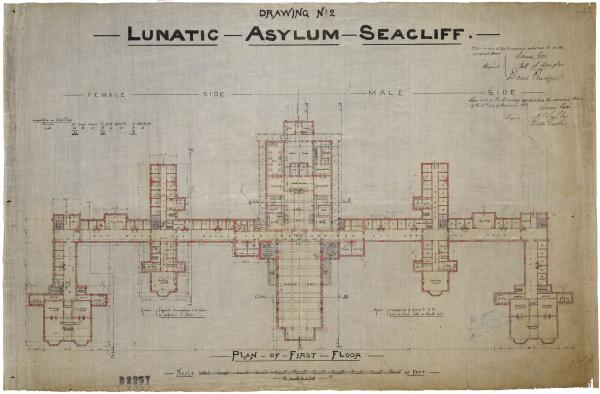
Plan of Seacliff Lunatic Asylum: New Zealand's largest building was completely symmetrical; its external facades belie the utilitarianism of its repetitious interior.

In 1875 the Otago Provincial Council decided to replace the existing Dunedin Lunatic Asylum on the site of what later became the Otago Boys High School with a new one on an existing government reserve at Seacliff 25 km from Dunedin. Once the council was abolished in 1876 responsibility for the complex passed to the Public Works Department, who had a policy that for any building of magnitude a private architect should be employed. Accordingly with regard to Seacliff, William Blair who was Engineer in Charge of the Middle Island (South Island) entered into communication with the Minister for Public Works who authorised him to communicate with Lawson. Blair had been chairman of the building committee for the Knox Church and had been influential in obtaining for Lawson the design of both that building and the later Otago Boys High School. After a meeting between Blair and Lawson, the architect was formally requested by letter to undertake the work, Lawson replied on 17 July 1878 accepting the commission. Lawson's only previous experience with designing such a building had been that of the Dunedin Benevolent Institution in the 1860s. Lawson decided to design the building in the Scottish Baronial style.

Designed to house 500 patients and 50 staff, the Seacliff Lunatic Asylum was, upon its completion, New Zealand's largest building for the next 50 years. The edifice broadly E-shaped ground plan was 740 feet (230 m) long by 228 feet (69 m) wide. The great tower, designed so that the inmates could be observed should they attempt to escape, was almost 50 metres (160 ft) tall. It was later said of the design that "the Victorians might not have wanted their lunatics living with them, but they liked to house them grandly".

As well as designing the permanent building Lawson also designed a temporary wooden building to accommodate sixty male patients and staff above the site for the new permanent building. Construction commenced on site in September 1879 and soon became apparent that parts of the site were unstable, first at the site of temporary building, before structural problems within the permanent building began to manifest themselves even before completion in July 1884 at a cost of £78,000. Finally in 1887 a major landslip occurred which rendered the north wing unsafe and it was eventually to be replaced by wooden buildings. The problems with the design could no longer be ignored.

The building continued to deteriorate with the tower demolished in 1945 and the remaining structure in 1957.

In 1888 an enquiry into the collapse was set up. In February, realising that he may be in legal trouble, Lawson applied to the enquiry to be allowed counsel to defend him. During the enquiry all involved in the construction – including the contractor, the head of the Public Works Department, the project's clerk of works and Lawson himself – were forced to give evidence to support their competence. The Commissioners apportioned blame to Lawson for constructional defects and not insisting on proper drainage works being carried out, but also placed blame on the Public Works Department for not paying attention to repeated applications from the architect to deal with drainage problems and warnings from Dr James Hector, the Director of Geological Survey.

There later became a popular misconception that the Commission of Inquiry had found Lawson to be "negligent and incompetent" despite these words not appearing in its report. The words are however first known to have appeared in the Dictionary of New Zealand Biography.

Before the Seacliff Commission of Inquiry, Lawson had relocated to Wellington on 26 May 1887 to serve as locum tenens for Wellington architect William Turnbull while he went overseas on a trip from February 1887 to December 1887. The relationship known as Turnbull and Lawson, with Lawson, making periodic visits to Dunedin before permanently returning within 12 months. Major projects undertaken by Lawson during the late 1880s were the Lawrence Presbyterian Church (1886), Tokomairiro Presbyterian Church (1888) and a grain and woolstore for Reid, Mclean & Co (1889).

=== Problems at First Church ===
Despite the problems at Seacliff, from the reports in various newspapers many Dunedin people disagreed with the commission's finding and Lawson's reputation among his fellow citizens was intact, though diminished. By 1889 it was apparent that there were issues with dampness on the walls of First Church despite it being only 16 years old. As a result the Deacon's Court passed over Lawson who was out of flavour with the session and commissioned Christchurch architect Thomas Stoddart Lambert who had an association with Lawson to investigate. Lambert found that the pointing of the stonework was inadequate in places which had allowed water to enter. Also water was able to enter the building due to the poor application of flashings around the pinnacles and gables. The most significant issues was found to be the roof-bearing timbers which had been sealed into the walls without proper ventilation and being of Oregon they had consequently rotted. The resulting four months of repairs by a workforce of between 30 and 40 was completed by July 1890 at a cost of more than £1,200.

As both he and his wife were members of the congregation and Lawson an elder of the Presbytery of Otago and Southland these failings of his most prestigious commission must have felt highly embarrassing. When combined with the issues at Seacliff and the economic downturn they were sufficient to cause him to quickly wind up his affairs and depart for Melbourne on 8 May 1890.

=== Final years ===
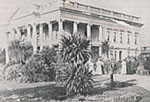
Earlsbrae Hall: Lawson designed this Greek Revival style mansion with Frederick Grey in 1890.

In the final period of his life Lawson rarely designed alone. Once in Melbourne, he entered into partnership with the architect Frederick Grey. Together they designed Earlsbrae Hall, a large Neoclassical house at Essendon, Victoria. This is now considered by some experts to be one of his greatest works, though it must be attributed to the partnership. It has been thought that perhaps the house was begun before Lawson arrived, but he departed Dunedin on 8 May 1890, and the foundation stone was laid on 16 August 1890, so there was enough time to be appointed and design the mansion. The principal aspect of the design, the tall Corinthian portico, is practically an exact match to those on Lawson's banks in Oamaru, the pediment of the National Bank in particular is essentially repeated here. Often said to resemble a Grecian temple, the architecture of a bold double-height Corinthian columned portico is derived from the Greek Revival; the wrapping around the house on three sides, and incorporating a verandah, is also reminiscent of the plantation houses of the American Deep South. The cost of construction to the owner Collier McCracken was £35,000; it later sold in 1911 for just £6000. Commercial buildings which survive from Lawson's Melbourne years include the Moran and Cato warehouse in Fitzroy and the College Church in Parkville, which were completed in 1897.

In 1900, at the age of 67, Lawson came out of his ten-year-long self-imposed exile from New Zealand and returned to Dunedin. Here he entered into practice with his former pupil J.Louis Salmond. A number of commercial and residential buildings were erected under their joint names, including the brick house known as "Threave" built for Watson Shennan at 367 High Street. This is one of Lawson's last works. Threave has particularly ornate carved verandahs in the Gothic style, but is today better known for its gardens than architecture. The house and gardens were extensively restored in the 1960s and 1970s by then-owner Geoff Baylis.

The Lawson–Salmond partnership would not last long. In 1902 at the age of 69 Lawson died suddenly while on a visit to his half-sister Jean Page Gardiner (nee Marshall) and her husband Robert at their farm Ludeum near Pleasant Point, in South Canterbury, on 3 December. While he had been having issues with his heart they had not been considered life threatening.

By the time of his death he had begun to re-establish his reputation, having been elected vice-president of the Otago Institute of Architects. Although much of Lawson's early work has since been either demolished or heavily altered, surviving plans and photographs from the period suggest that the buildings he was working on at this time included a variety of styles. Indeed, Lawson designed principally in both the classical and Gothic styles simultaneously throughout his career. His style and manner of architecture can best be explained through an examination of six of his designs, three Gothic and three in the classical style, and each an individual interpretation and use of their common designated style.

== Works in the Gothic style ==
The British Protestant religions were at this period still heavily influenced by the Anglo-Catholic Oxford Movement, which had decreed Gothic as the only architectural style suited for Christian worship; Greek, Roman, and Italian renaissance architecture was viewed as "pagan" and inappropriate in the design of churches. Thus Lawson was never given opportunities such as Francis Petre enjoyed when the latter recreated great Italianate renaissance basilicas such as the Cathedral of the Blessed Sacrament in Christchurch. Dunedin had in fact been founded, only thirteen years before Lawson's arrival, by the Free Church of Scotland, a denomination not known for its love of ornament and decoration, and certainly not the architecture of the more Catholic countries.

Lawson's work in Gothic design, like that of most other architects of this period, was clearly influenced by the style and philosophy of Augustus Pugin. However, he adapted the style for the form of congregational worship employed by the Presbyterian denomination. The lack of ritual and religious processions rendered unnecessary a large chancel; hence in Lawson's version of the Gothic, the chancel and transepts (the areas which traditionally in Roman and Anglo-Catholic churches contained the Lady Chapel and other minor chapels) are merely hinted at in the design. Thus at First Church the tower is above the entrance to the building rather than in its traditional place in the centre of the church at the axis of nave, chancel and transepts. In all, Lawson designed over forty churches in the Gothic style. Like Benjamin Mountfort's, some were constructed entirely of wood; however, the majority were in stone.

=== First Church, Dunedin 1873 ===
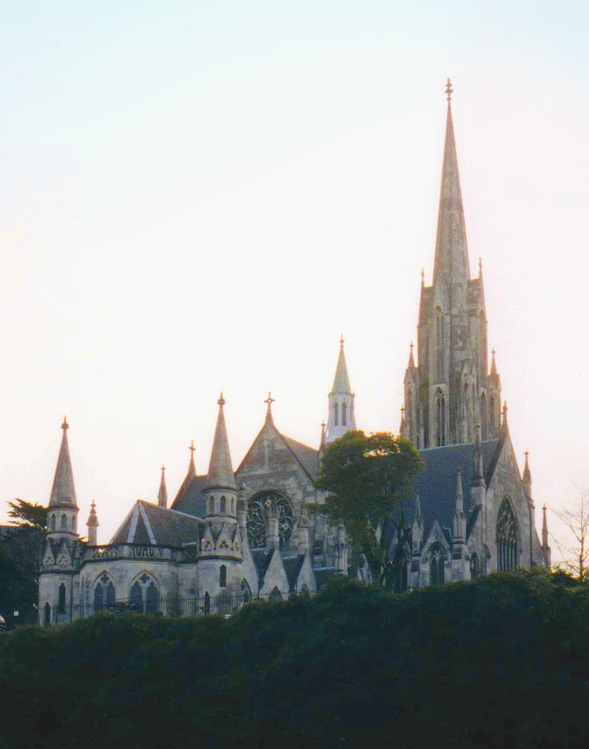
The First Church: The rear of the building shows the true architecture and extravagant European basilica-like quality of the church, which shocked its early congregation.

This architectural tour de force in the decorated Gothic style was designed in 1862. Construction was delayed after the Otago Provincial Council decided to reduce Bell Hill, on which it was to stand, by some 12 metres (40 ft): the hill had proved a major impediment to transport in the rapidly expanding city. As a result the foundation stone wasn't laid until 15 May 1868. Just before the official opening on 23 November 1873 Lawson realised while sailing up the harbour that the spire was 15 feet (4.6 m) too short, and had a slight lean. He insisted on the spire being dismantled and rebuilt to the correct specifications, which was completed in 1875.

The church is dominated by its multi-pinnacled tower crowned by a spire rising to 54 metres (177 ft). The spire is unusual as it is pierced by two-storeyed gabled windows on all sides, which give an illusion of even greater height. It can be seen from much of central Dunedin, and dominates the skyline of lower Moray Place.

The expense of the building was not without criticism as some members of the Presbyterian synod felt the metropolitan church should not have been so privileged over the country districts where congregants had no purpose designed places of worship or only modest ones. The Reverend Dr Burns's championship of the project ensured it was carried through against such objections.

Externally First Church successfully replicates the effect, if on a smaller scale, of the late Norman cathedrals of England. The cathedral-like design and size can best be appreciated from the rear. There is an apse flanked by turrets, which are dwarfed by the massive gable containing the great rose window. It is this large circular window which after the spire becomes the focal point of the rear elevations. The whole architectural essay appears here almost European. Inside, instead of the stone vaulted ceiling of a Norman cathedral, there are hammer beams supporting a ceiling of pitched wood and a stone pointed arch acts as a simple proscenium to the central pulpit. Above this diffused light enters through a rose window of stained glass. This is flanked by further lights on the lower level, while twin organ pipes emphasise the symmetry of the pulpit.

The building is constructed of Oamaru stone, set on foundations of basalt breccia from Port Chalmers, with details carved by Louis Godfrey, who also did much of the woodcarving in the interior. The use of "cathedral glass", coloured but unfigured glass pending the donation of a pictorial window for the rose window is characteristic of Otago's 19th-century churches, where donors were relatively few reflecting the generally "low church" sentiments of the place. Similar examples can be found in Lawson's churches throughout Otago. Notable among these are the former Trinity Methodist Church in Stuart Street, Dunedin (later used as a home for the Fortune Theatre), the spired Knox Church in the north of the city, and the Tokomairiro Presbyterian Church in Milton, said at the time of its construction to have been the southernmost building of its height.

Lawson also designed Knox Church, which has a similar tower, also in Dunedin. This building, less well known than First Church, also designed in the 13th-century Gothic style, but in bluestone, is considered by some to be his finest achievement.

=== Larnach Castle 1871 ===
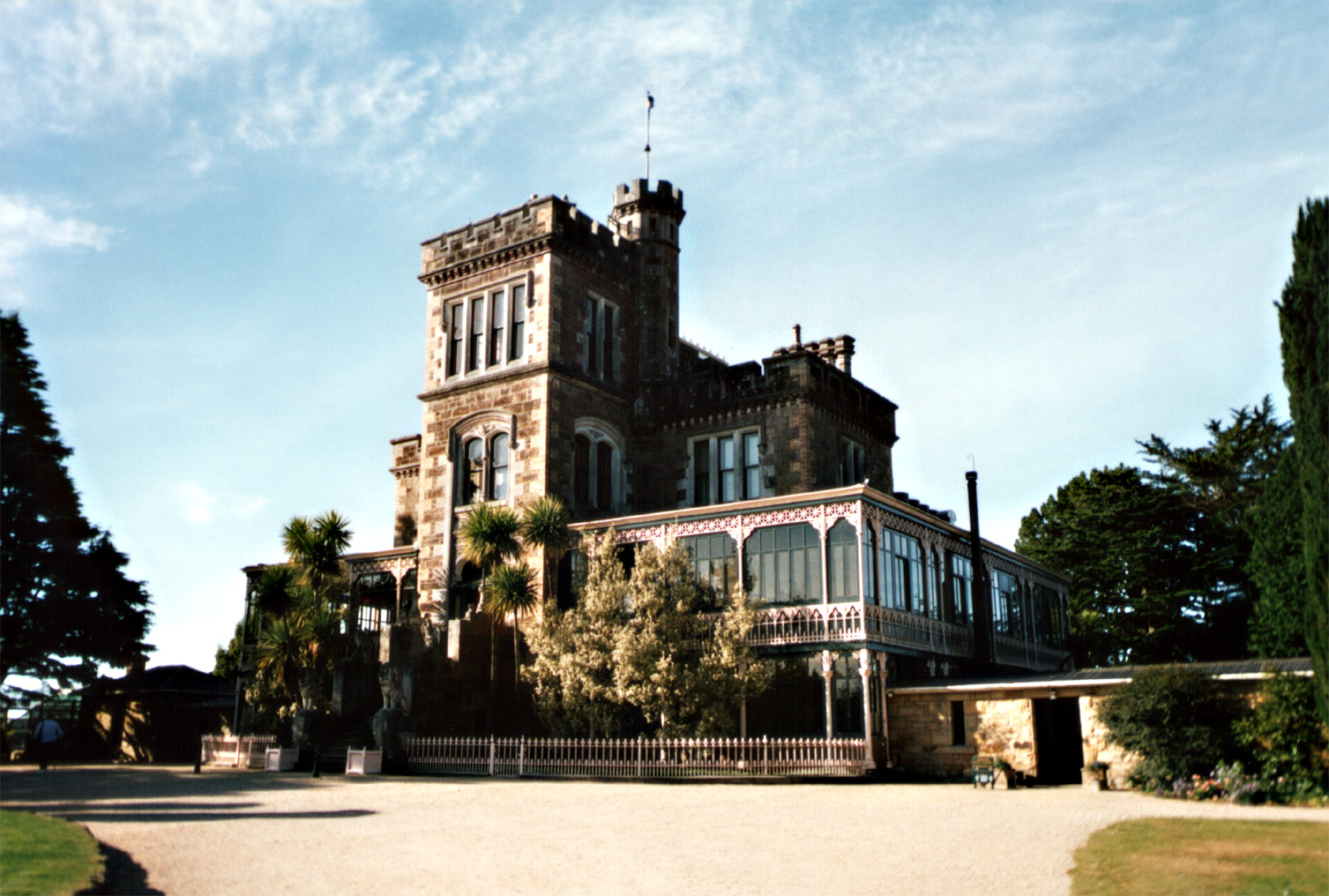
Larnach Castle, the principal facade

Lawson designed several large private houses, the best known was at first called "The Camp". Today it is better remembered as Larnach Castle. It was built in 1871 for William Larnach, a local businessman and politician recalled for his bravura personal style. It has been hailed as one of New Zealand's finest mansions, described on its completion as: "doubtless the most princely, as it is the most substantial and elegant residence in New Zealand". There is a tradition that Larnach designed his house after Castle Forbes, his father's house at Baroona in Australia. The plans, however, are unquestionably from Lawson's office. The origin of the myth is simply that Larnach Castle has verandahs, doubtless insisted on by Larnach, an obviously colonial addition to its otherwise conventional revivalist design. However these do lend it distinction.

Although some have questioned if Larnach Castle was an essay in the revived Scottish baronial manner. The main facade resembles a small, castellated tower house, with the characteristic rubble masonry, turrets and battlements, present at Abbotsford, an exemplar of the style. It has been accurately described as a "castellated villa wrapped in a two-storey verandah". The principal facade is dominated by a central tower complete with a stair turret which gives the house its castle-like appearance.

The interior of the building is ornate, with imported marbles and Venetian glass used in the Italianate decoration. As with First Church, there are also numerous carvings by Louis Godfrey. It took 200 men three years to complete the shell and a further twelve years for the interior to be finished. In 1887 the building was further extended by the addition of a 3,000-square-foot (280 m^{2}) ballroom. In 1880, following the death of his first wife, Larnach had Lawson design in Dunedin's Northern Cemetery a miniaturised version of First Church as a family mausoleum. Larnach was interred in the mausoleum himself. While serving as New Zealand's Minister of Finance and of Mines in 1898, he committed suicide in a committee room of the parliamentary building in Wellington, not because of the financial stresses of the Colonial Bank of New Zealand, as previously thought but because of circulating rumours about an affair between his eldest son and his third wife.

=== Otago Boys' High School 1885 ===
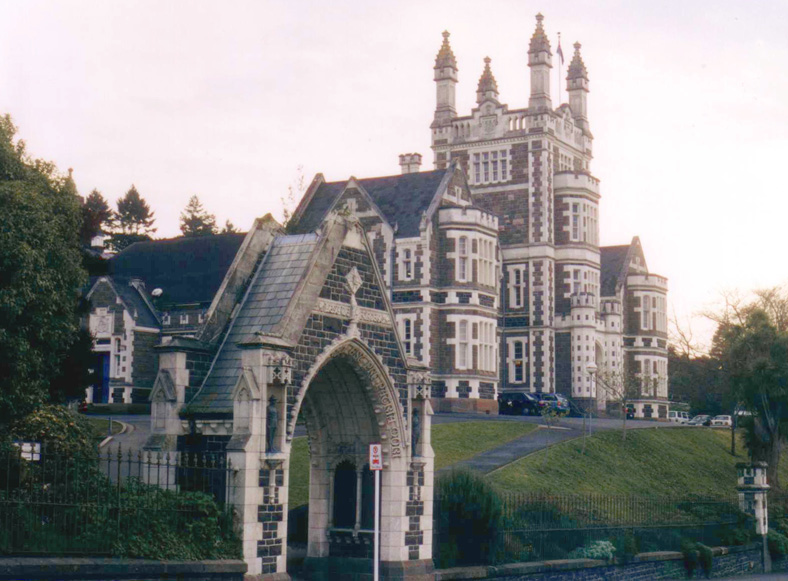
Otago Boys' High School: The ecclesiastical entrance arch leads to an extravaganza of turrets and gables, the central tower is crowned by Tudor pinnacles, above a Renaissance balustrade.

Otago Boys' High School, Arthur Street, Dunedin, was completed in 1885. Often referred to as Gothic, in fact it is a hybrid of several orders of architecture with obvious Renaissance/Tudor style, and Gothic influences: the nearest style into which it can be categorised is probably Jacobethan (a peculiarly English form of the Neo-Renaissance). The building has long been regarded as one of the finest examples of architecture in Dunedin, built of stone with many window embrasures and corners of lighter quoins. The school's many turrets and towers led to the architect Nathaniel Wales describing it in 1890 as "a semi-ecclesiastical building" in the "Domestic Tudor style of medieval architecture".

The building, though castle-like, is not truly castellated although some of the windows are surmounted by crenelated ornament. Its highest point, the dominating tower, is decorated by stone balustrading. The tower has turrets at each corner – an overall composition more redolent of the early 17th-century English Renaissance than an earlier true castle. While the school's entrance arch was obviously designed to impart an ecclesiastical or collegiate air, the school has the overall appearance of a prosperous Victorian country house.

== Works in the classical style ==
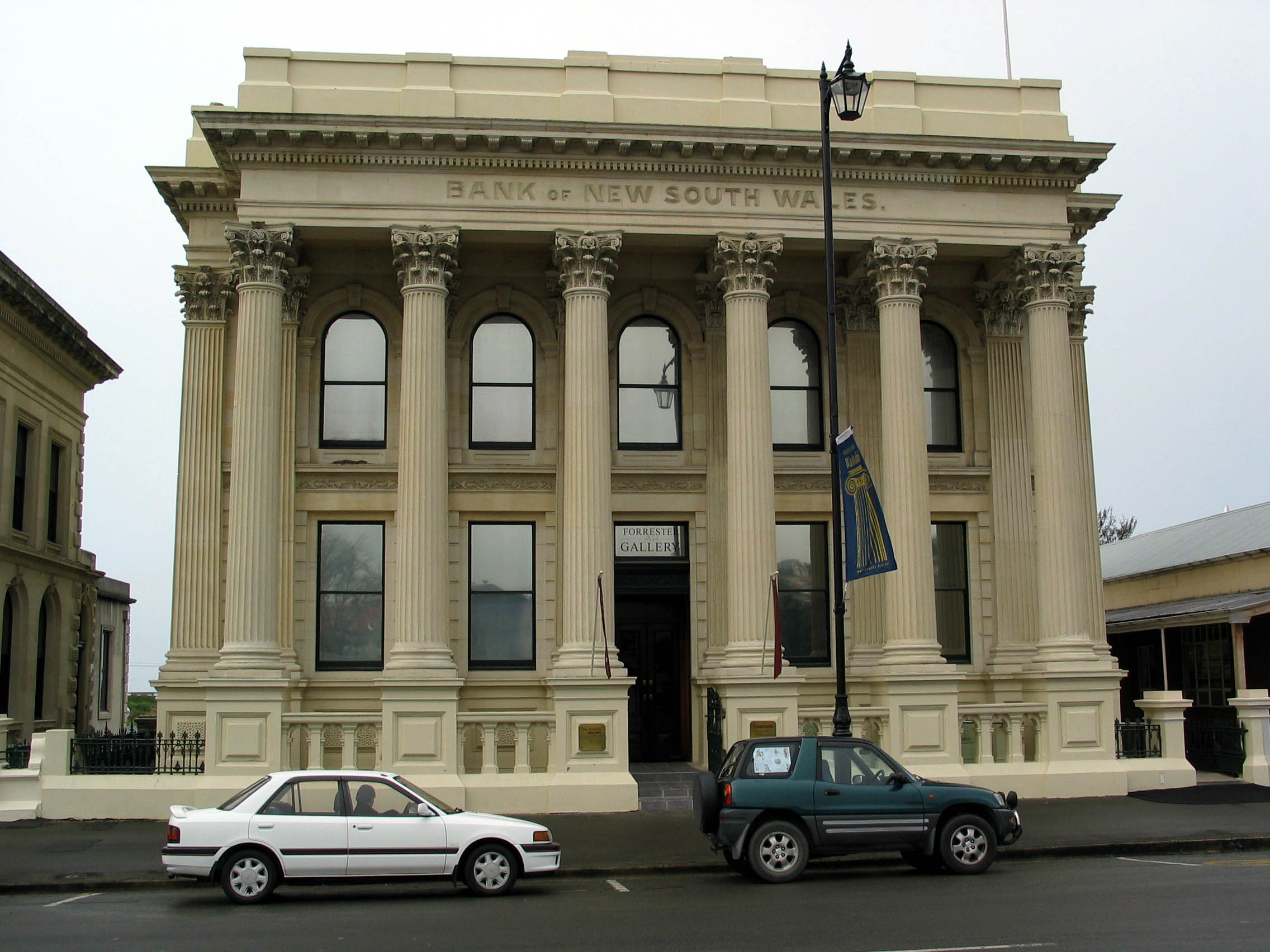
Bank of New South Wales, now the Forrester Gallery

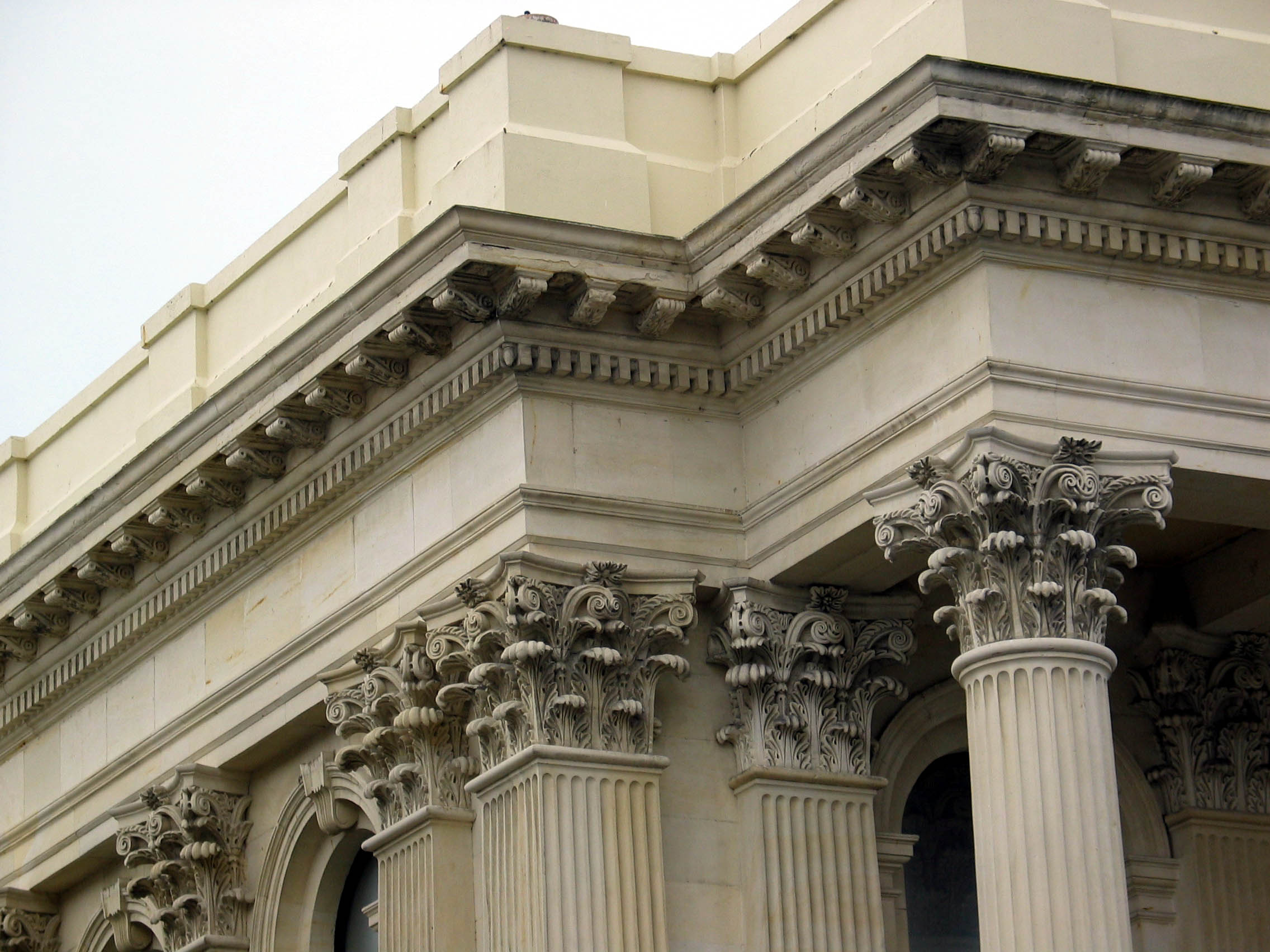
Bank of New South Wales: detailing of the intricate sculpting on the capitals of the Corinthian columns, supporting the entablature. The architrave, metope and frieze are undecorated.

Lawson's classical works tended to be confined to public and corporate buildings. It appears that the Gothic style favoured by the Protestants for their churches was also their preferred choice for their houses. Much of Lawson's classical work is in the town of Oamaru, 120 kilometres (75 mi) north of Dunedin. Here, as in Dunedin itself, Lawson built in the local Oamaru stone, a hard limestone that is ideal for building purposes, especially where ornate moulding is required. The finished stonework has a creamy, sandy colour. Unfortunately, it is not strongly resistant to today's pollution, and can be prone to surface crumbling.

=== Bank of Otago, Oamaru 1870 ===
Lawson was hired to design a building for the Bank of Otago in Oamaru. Inspired by David Rhind's neo-Classical Commercial Bank of Scotland building Lawson designed the building with a Corinthian portico, rather than the paired pilasters of Rhind's building Lawson opted for quoins.

=== Bank of New South Wales, Oamaru 1883 ===
Built in 1883, located right next to his earlier National Bank, this is also Neoclassical in design, its limestone facade dominated by a great six-columned, unpedimented portico. The columns in the Corinthian order support a divided entablature; the lower section or architrave bears the inscription "Bank of New South Wales", while above the frieze remains undecorated. The building, while not jarring, has less architectural merit than the National Bank building, even though it was originally intended to be more classical and impressive than its neighbour. The imposing effect the architect sought is lessened at ground level where the portico's columns are linked by a balustrade. This extinguishes the clean-lined effect one would expect in a classical building of this stature and order and reduces the building's appearance to that of a doll's house. This effect is exacerbated by the windows within the portico (flat topped on the lower floor and round topped on the upper floor); these are disproportionately large and destroy the "temple" effect which the great portico was intended to create. Today, this externally unaltered building is used as an art gallery.

=== The Star and Garter Hotel, Oamaru 1867 ===
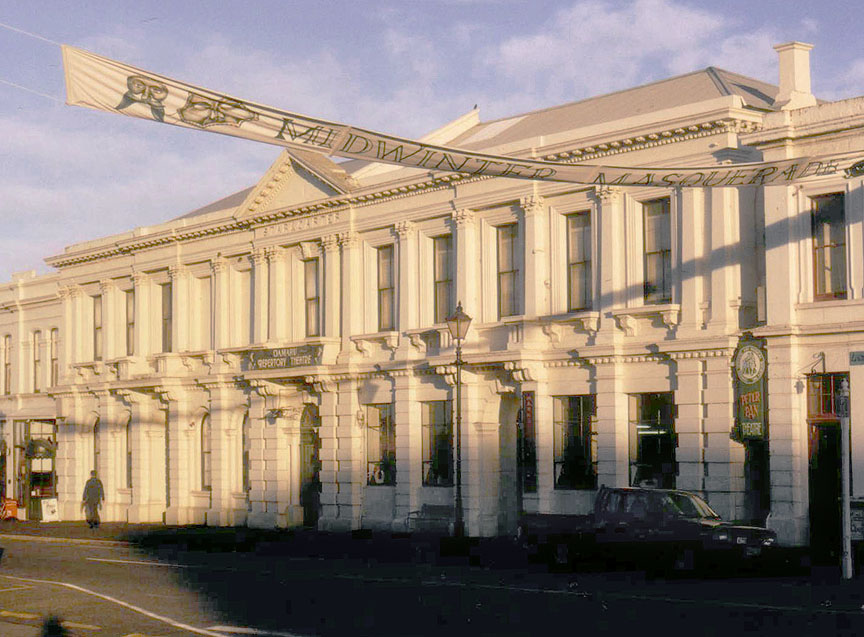
The Star and Garter building in Oamaru

This Oamaru Hotel is one of Lawson's more adventurous forays into classical architecture. Forsaking Palladian-influenced temple-like columns and porticos, he initially took as his inspiration the mannerist palazzi, which were a reaction to the more ornate high Renaissance style of architecture popular in early 16th century Italy. There are even some minor similarities between this building and the Palazzo del Te. Just as at street level the palazzi often have a ground floor of rusticated stone, so did this hotel. Massive blocks of ashlar were used to create an impression of strength, supporting the more delicately designed floor above; this feeling of strength was further enhanced by double pilasters serving merely to imply a need to support the great weight above.

Above this solid and severe facade that Lawson chose instead of the customary two or three floors, the massive blocks of stone support just one floor. This upper floor is not an obvious piano nobile, but appears, though of more delicate and simple design, to be of equal value to the floor below. The rusticated pilasters of the lower floor are continued above, but become smooth dressed stone to match the upper facade. The pilasters' capitals are Corinthian, and as at the Bank of New South Wales they support an undecorated entablature. The centre and focal point of the building is marked by a pediment, which again gives the air of a palazzo.

However, what Lawson created was not a mannerist or indeed Palladian town palazzo at all but a hybrid, while similar, at first glance, to the neo-palladian villas and country houses of the late 18th century found in Italy and England, examples being Villa di Poggio Imperiale and Woburn Abbey. The Star and Garter, though, through Lawson's "pick, mix and match" approach to different forms of classical architecture is in its own way quite unique.

Since the Star and Garter's completion, many of its windows have either been blocked or enlarged, changes that have been detrimental to the architectural effect Lawson created. The building is now used mainly by a theatre company, although a restaurant at the eastern end of the building retains the hotel's original name.

== Appraisal and legacy ==
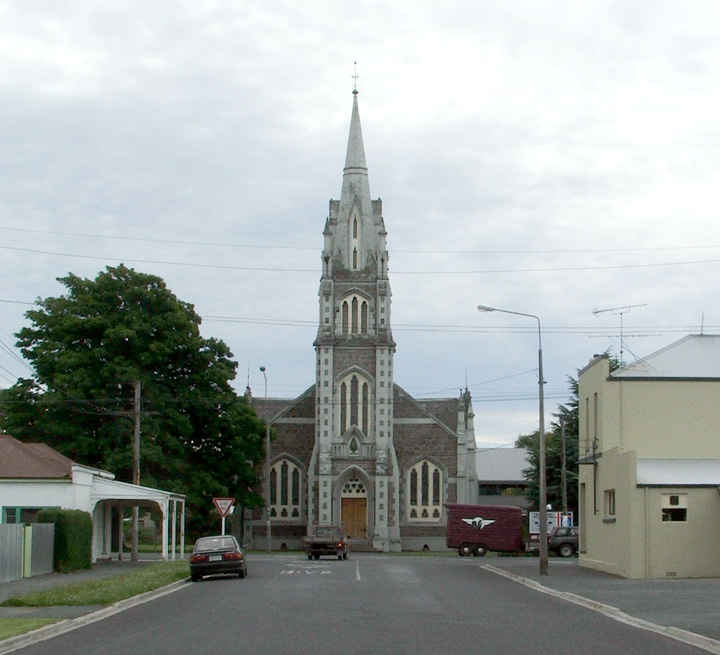
Lawson's Tokomairiro Presbyterian Church dominates the old road from Milton to Fairfax (Tokoiti).

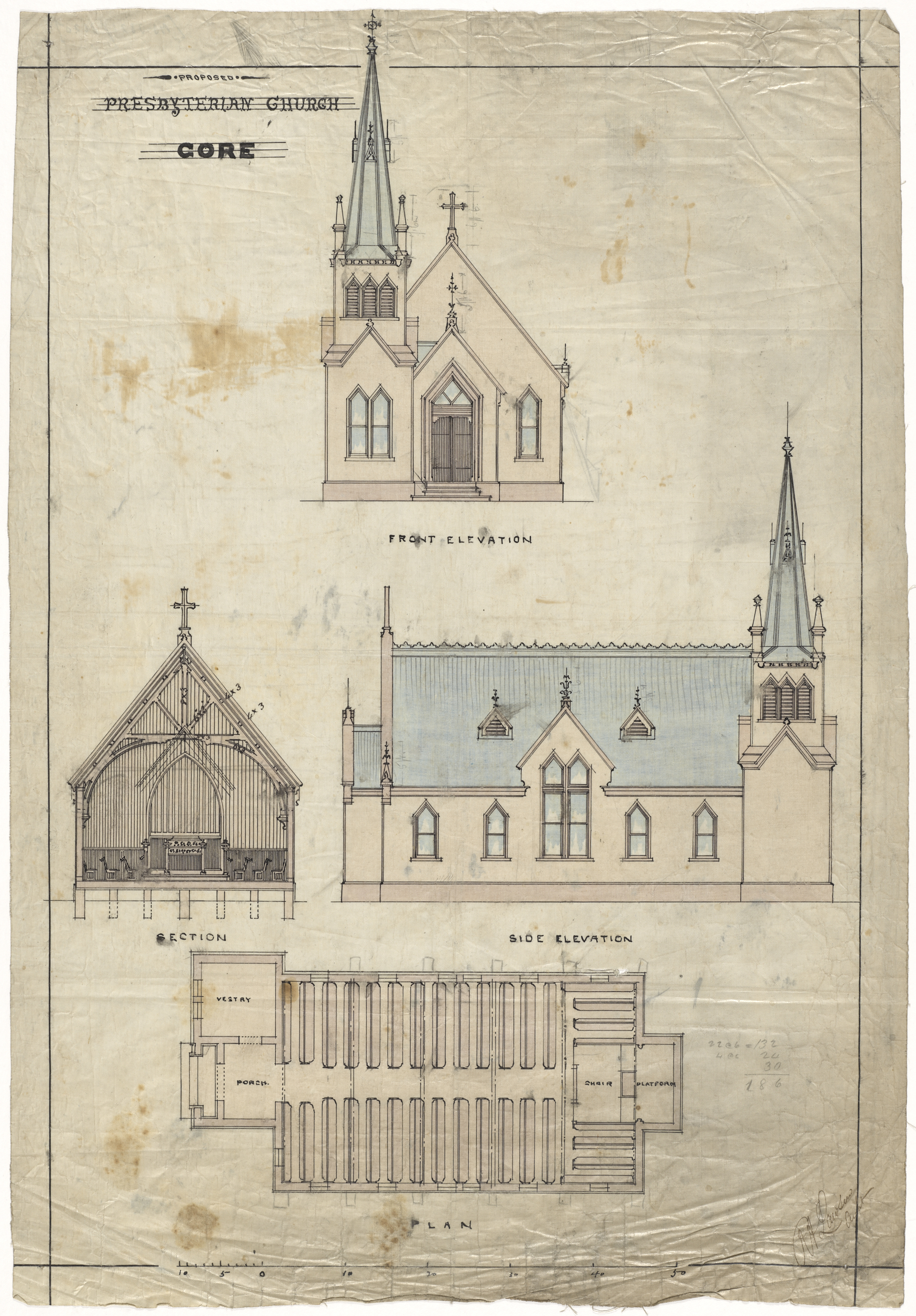
Lawson's architectural plans for East Gore Presbyterian Church

Robert Lawson was chiefly an architect of his time, designing in the styles then popular. The British emigrants to the colonies wanted architecture to remind them of home, and thus it is not surprising that Lawson's most notable buildings are all in a form of Gothic. Many, such as Larnach Castle and Seacliff Asylum, have been described as Scottish baronial; however, this is not an accurate description, although that particular form of Gothic may have been at times his inspiration. Lawson's particular skill was mixing various forms of similar architecture to create a building that was in its own way unique, rather than a mere pastiche of an earlier style; having achieved this, he then went on to adapt his architecture to accommodate the climate and materials locally available. Local stone and wood were particular favourites of his, especially the good quality limestone of Oamaru, and these were often used in preference to the excellent bricks equally available. Small Gothic Lancet windows were often avoided and replaced by large bay windows, allowing the rooms to be flooded with light rather than creating the darker interiors of true Gothic buildings. Larnach Castle has often been criticised as being clumsy and incongruous, but this derives from the persistent misinterpretation of Lawson's work as Scottish baronial. It is true that in a Scottish glen, much of his work would be incongruous, but Lawson realised that he was designing not for the glens and mountains of his homeland, but rather for a new country, with new ideals and vast vistas. Thus, set upon its two-storeyed verandahs, and looking out over the Otago Peninsula and Otago Harbour from 240 metres (800 ft) above sea level, the mansion seems perfectly positioned.

At the time of Lawson's work the rival schools of Classical and Gothic architecture were both equally fashionable. In his ecclesiastical commissions, Lawson worked exclusively for the Protestant denominations and thus never received the opportunity to build a great church in the classical style. His major works therefore have to be appraised through his use of the Gothic. First Church thus has to be regarded as his masterpiece. His classical works, though often competently and skillfully executed, were mostly confined to smaller public buildings. He never had the opportunity to refine and hone his classical ideas, and therefore these never had the opportunity to make the same impact as his Gothic works.

Much of Lawson's work is either demolished or much altered. Two of his timber Gothic churches survive at Kakanui (1870) and the East Gore Presbyterian Church. The designs still standing (which include all of the works described in detail above) have ensured that Lawson's reputation has fully recovered from the condemnation he received following the Seacliff enquiry.

Today, Lawson is lauded as the architect of some of New Zealand's finest historic buildings. The Otago Branch of the New Zealand Historic Places Trust has inaugurated a memorial lecture programme, the RA Lawson Lecture, which is presented in Dunedin annually by an eminent local or overseas speaker.

== Personal life ==
Sometime from 1861 onwards Lawson was introduced to Jessie Sinclair Hepburn. Jessie had been born on 1 July 1843 at Kirkcaldy, Fife in Scotland to Rachel and George Hepburn. She had emigrated in 1850 to Otago with her parents and siblings on the Poictiers. They were married on 15 November 1864 at her father's property at Wakari. The service was conducted by the Rev. David M. Stuart, a former pupil at Lawson's Abdie Parish School in Scotland. From 1864 onwards the couple lived in a house on Bellevue Street in Roslyn, Dunedin that Lawson had designed. From Lawson's point of view, this was a good marriage. His father-in-law, George Hepburn, was at the time the second session clerk of First Church, as well as a successful business man and politician with excellent credentials in early Dunedin. Throughout his life Lawson remained a devout Presbyterian, being involved in church management while in Melbourne and becoming an elder and session clerk of First Church like his father-in-law. He was also closely involved in the Sunday school movement. The couple had the following children:

- Rachel Ida Lawson(15 March 1866 – 25 July 1956).
- James Newburgh Lawson (31 January 1868 – 20 October 1957).
- Margaret Lillian Lawson (31 August 1869 – 16 August 1926).
- Jessie Lawson (9 July 1871– 20 August 1878).

Lawson was an amateur singer and performed in the odd concerts and also painted which lead to him being a member of the Fine Arts Exhibition Committee. Beside his architectural work Lawson had business interests in the Colclough Quartz Reef Mining Company in 1870, the Oamaru Stone Quarrying & Export Company in 1877, the Otago Slate Company in 1878 and the New Zealand Cement & Stone Company in 1881, as well as being a director of the Tramways Company and a trustee of the Dunedin Savings Bank.

== Works by Lawson ==
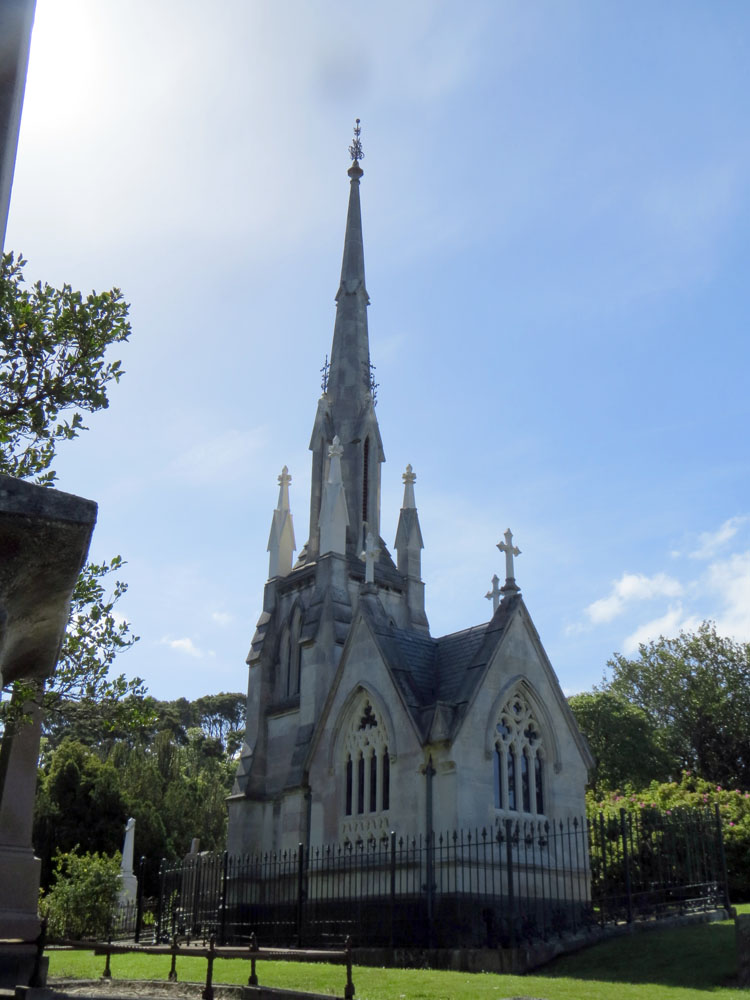
The mausoleum of William Larnach and family, in Dunedin Northern Cemetery, a miniature replica of the First Church of Otago

Lawson designed an estimated 46 church buildings, 21 banks, 134 houses, 16 school buildings, 13 hotels, 15 civic and institutional buildings, and 120 commercial and industrial buildings. Of these 94 survive, including 46 in Dunedin, 43 in the rest of New Zealand and five in Melbourne.

- 1868: The Star and Garter Hotel, Oamaru.
- 1869: Wesleyan Trinity Church, Dunedin.
- 1870: East Taieri Presbyterian church, East Taieri.
- 1870: St Andrew's Presbyterian Church, Dunedin.
- 1871: Bank of Otago, Oamaru. Later occupied by the National Bank.
- 1873: First Church of Otago, Moray Place, Dunedin.
- 1874: Union Bank of Australia (later ANZ Bank), Princes Street, Dunedin.
- 1876: Knox Church, Dunedin, Dunedin.
- 1876: Larnach Castle, Otago Oeninsula.
- 1880: Dunedin Town Hall, Dunedin.
- 1881: East Gore Presbyterian Church.
- 1881: Larnach Mausoleum, Dunedin Northern Cemetery
- 1883: Bank of New South Wales, Oamaru (now Forrester Gallery).
- 1884: Seacliff Lunatic Asylum, Seacliff.
- 1885: Otago Boys' High School.
- 1889: Tokomairiro Presbyterian Church, Milton.
- 1890: Earlsbrae Hall, Essendon, Victoria.
