= Dunedin Northern Cemetery =

Cemetery in Signal Hill, New Zealand

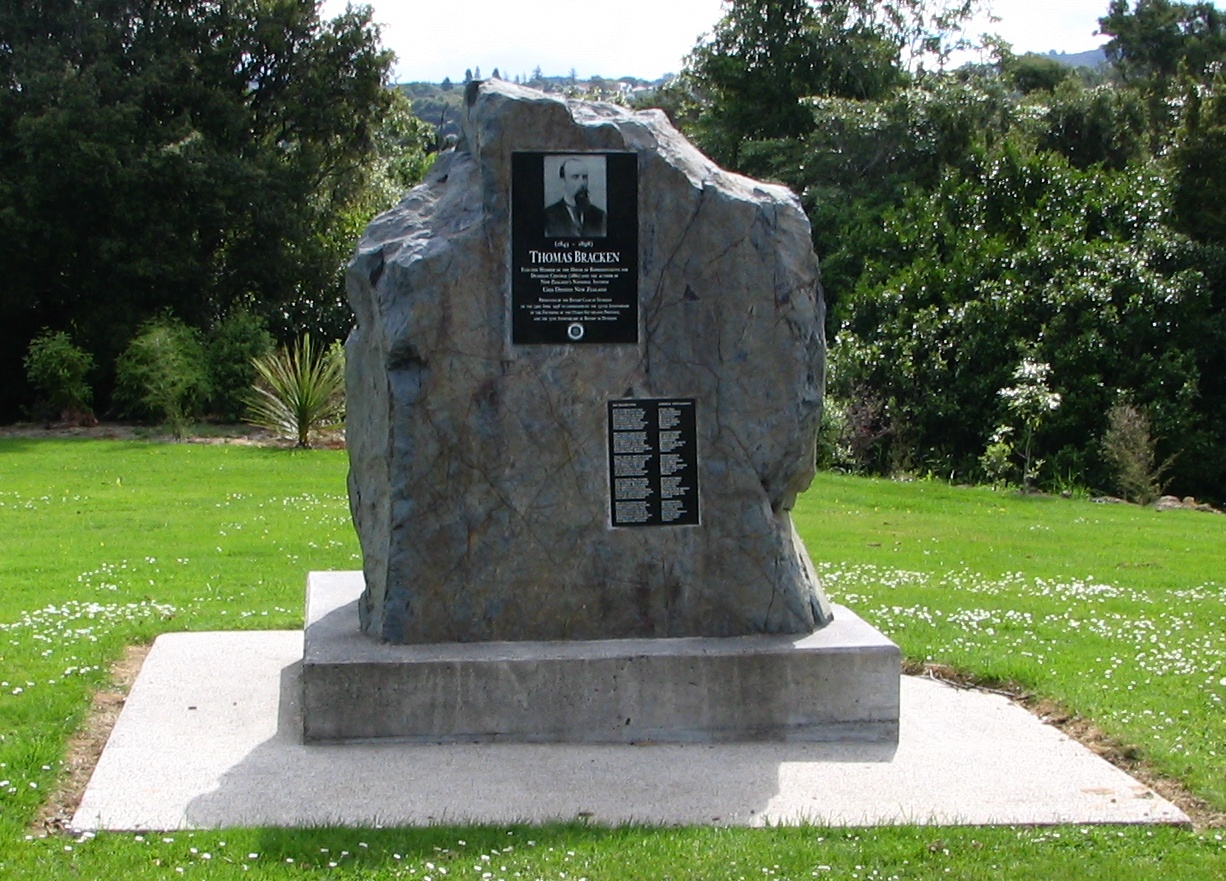
- Memorial to Thomas Bracken at Dunedin's Northern Cemetery.
- Interactive map of Dunedin Northern Cemetery

Details
- Established: 1872
- Location: Signal Hill, Dunedin
- Country: New Zealand
- Coordinates: 45°51′36″S 170°31′29″E
- Size: 8 hectares (20 acres)
- No. of graves: >13,000
- Website: Official website
- Find a Grave: Dunedin Northern Cemetery

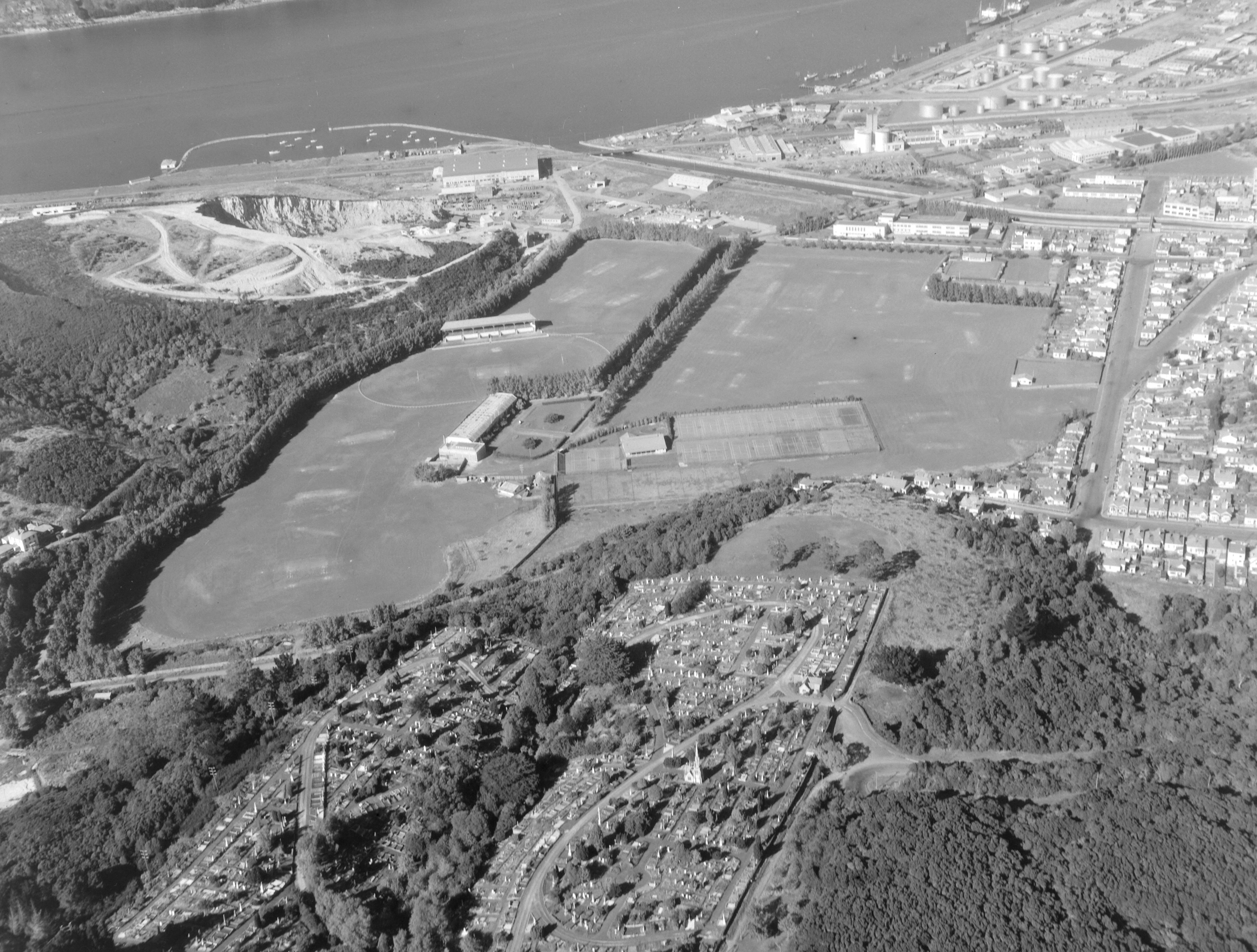
An aerial view across Dunedin North, taken in 1955, showing Otago Harbour and Logan Point Quarry (top), Logan Park (centre), and the Northern Cemetery (bottom). The Larnach mausoleum is clearly visible.

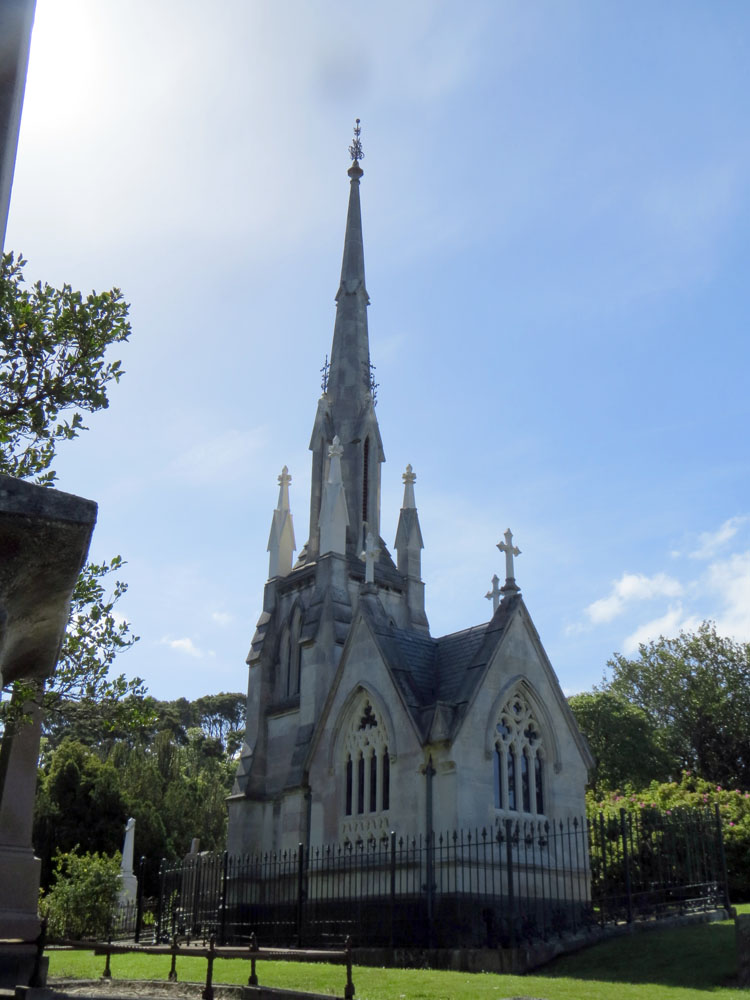
The mausoleum of William Larnach and family is a miniature replica of the First Church of Otago. It was designed by Robert Lawson, who was also later buried at the cemetery.

The Dunedin Northern Cemetery is a major historic cemetery in the southern New Zealand city of Dunedin. It is located on a sloping site close to Lovelock Avenue on a spur of Signal Hill close to the Dunedin Botanic Gardens and the suburb of Ōpoho, overlooking Dunedin North and Logan Park. The 8-hectare (20-acre) site was set aside in 1872, with the last plot being purchased in 1937. The cemetery forms part of Dunedin's Town belt, a green belt surrounding the inner city. Unlike many cemeteries of its age, Dunedin Northern Cemetery is not divided by denomination, and with its landscapes and wooded slopes remains an important part of the city's Victorian landscape.

The cemetery contains many notable graves and tombs, most prominently the mausoleum of William Larnach, designed by R.A. Lawson as a miniature replica of First Church. Other notable burials and interments include Thomas Bracken and Vincent Pyke.

There are war graves of 17 Commonwealth service personnel from World War I and 3 from World War II.

The sexton's cottage at the entrance to the cemetery contains a visitor's centre. A commemorative lookout, the Bracken Lookout, is located at the southern end of the cemetery, and commands views across Logan Park, the University of Otago and central city.

The cemetery is listed on the New Zealand Historic Places Trust Register as a Historic Place – Category I.

== Notable interments ==
- Thomas Bracken
- Alfred Henry Burton
- Thomas Hocken
- W. M. Hodgkins
- William Larnach
- Robert Lawson
- William Mason
- George O'Brien
- Ada Paterson
- Alfred Hamish Reed
