= Louise Petherbridge =

New Zealand actor, theatre director and lecturer (1931–2024)

Louise Petherbridge QSO
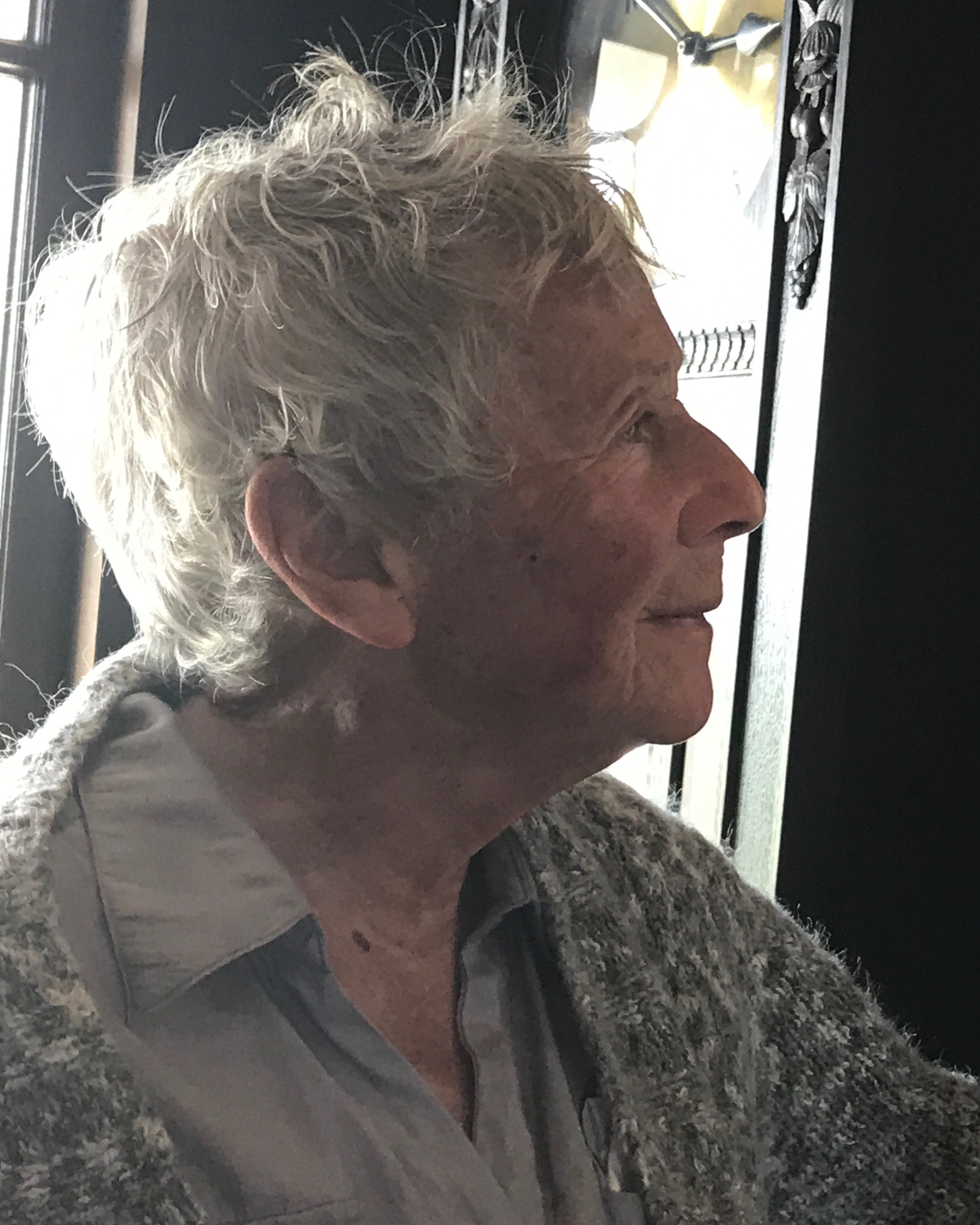
- Petherbridge at her home in 2019
- Born: Louise Durant Harris; 11 May 1931; Dunedin, New Zealand
- Died: 18 January 2024 (aged 92); Dunedin, New Zealand
- Years active: 1957–2007
- Spouse: Edward Petherbridge (m. 1957; div. 1980)
- Children: 1

Louise Durant Petherbridge, QSO (née Harris; 11 May 1931 – 18 January 2024) was a New Zealand actress, director, deviser, producer and lecturer.

== Early life and education ==
Petherbridge was born Louise Durant Harris in Dunedin on 11 May 1931. She was educated at St Hilda's Collegiate School and the University of Otago, graduating in 1953 with a Bachelor of Arts degree in English. She was an active member of the Otago University Drama Society (OUDS), and also appeared in plays for the Dunedin Repertory Society, including Aldous Huxley's The Gioconda Smile (1949).

In 1953, Harris won a New Zealand Government Drama Bursary, which allowed her to study for two years at the Northern Theatre School in Bradford, under Esmé Church. A fellow student was Edward Petherbridge, and the two married in 1957. They divorced in 1980.

== Career ==
Petherbridge acted in weekly and fortnightly rep with companies including Lincoln Theatre Rep and Ipswich Rep (under director Peter Coe), playing Alison in the first out-of-London production of John Osborne's Look Back in Anger in August 1957. She also played the title role in The Diary of Anne Frank at Ipswich Rep early in 1958, again directed by Coe, amongst other plays. In 1958, Petherbridge (with her husband) returned to New Zealand to spend eighteen months touring with the New Zealand Players under Stafford Byrne. She played the lead, Clarissa Hailsham-Brown, in Agatha Christie's The Spider's Web, and Gwendolen Fairfax in Oscar Wilde's The Importance of Being Earnest. Edward Petherbridge played Algernon Moncrieff in this production, and Stafford Byrne's wife, English actor Barbara Leake, played Lady Bracknell. Both shows toured the country during 1958-59, following which the Petherbridges performed with the NZ Players Drama Quartet, giving 150 performances for schools during 1959, one of which Edward recalls in his autobiography.

The Petherbridges returned to England, where Louise later gave birth to their son David, and continued her career, including a brief period working for Noël Coward. She returned to New Zealand in the mid 1970s, after she and Edward separated, divorcing in 1980. She had a long and outstanding career as an actor, producer, writer/deviser and director in New Zealand.

Petherbridge's many theatre acting roles after her return to New Zealand include: Amanda in The Glass Menagerie by Tennessee Williams, 1977, Fortune Theatre, Dunedin, at the Athenaeum, directed by Murray Hutchinson; Eleanor of Aquitaine in James Goldman's The Lion in Winter 1980, Fortune Theatre, director Alex Gilchrist; Nurse in Romeo and Juliet, 1981, Fortune Theatre, directed by Anthony Richardson; Stephanie Abrahams in Tom Kempinski's Duet For One, Fortune Theatre, director Anthony Richardson; Judith Bliss in Noël Coward's Hay Fever, 1984, Centrepoint Theatre, Palmerston North, directed by Stuart Devenie; Madame de Rosemonde in Christopher Hampton's Les Liaisons Dangereueses, 1986, Fortune Theatre, director Lisa Warrington; Lila in Michelanne Forster's Songs My Mother Taught Me, 1994, Court 2, Christchurch, director Brian Bell; multiple roles in Giles Havergal's adaptation of Graham Greene's Travels With My Aunt, 2000, Fortune Theatre, director Hilary Norris; Auntie in Morris Panych's Auntie and Me, 2005, Fortune Theatre, director Lisa Warrington.

=== Selected plays and productions ===
- 1974: Played Katherine Mansfield in Brian McNeill's The Two Tigers (Fortune Theatre at the Athenaeum, director Murray Hutchinson). "Louise Petherbridge gave quite a superb performance as Katherine. So fluid in speech and movement, she was delicate or brave as required..."
- 1976: Director/co-adaptor (with Rowena Cullen), The Tempest, a Bunraku puppet-style adaptation of Shakespeare's play, initially at the Globe Theatre, Dunedin, and in 1978 at the Court Theatre, Christchurch.
- 1978: Director/artistic director, Orlando, an adaptation of Virginia Woolf's novel (John Drummond composer, Shona Dunlop choreographer) for Dunedin Dance Theatre as a contemporary masque, encompassing music, dance and drama. At Playhouse Theatre, Dunedin. "We do not presume to interpret Virginia Woolf's brilliant novel entire. This is simply a montage inspired by it."
- 1981: Director/co-creator While Grandmother Played Bridge for Dunedin Dance Theatre, at Dunedin Teachers College Auditorium, choreographer Shona Dunlop. Inspired by a short story by the Austrian emigre Dr Nicholas Zisserman, it sought to recreate the mood in Austria prior to and during the Nazi takeover as perceived by the young Nicholas. Performers included Petherbridge's son David as Young Nicholas, Honor McKellar, Jan Bolwell, Terry MacTavish, Carol Brown and others.
- 1981: Actor (Lady Bracknell), Oscar Wilde's The Importance of Being Earnest, Fortune Theatre, Dunedin, director Rawiri Paratene.
- 1982: Actor/script commissioner, The Perfumed Business Woman by Brian McNeill (playwright) and John Drummond (composer), Fortune Theatre, Dunedin, director Anthony Richardson. A solo play about Mata Hari.
- 1991: Director/deviser, with Edwin Carr (music), Coup De Folie, a piece about NZ writer and teacher Sylvia Ashton-Warner (played by Terry MacTavish). Manhattan Theatre, Dunedin. Choreography by Shona Dunlop.
- 2007: Actor (Miss Helen), Athol Fugard's The Road To Mecca, at the Globe Theatre, Dunedin, directed by Lisa Warrington.

=== Film and television ===
Petherbridge made some film and television appearances. Short films include Cake Tin (2006), directed by Rosemary Riddell and Dream-Makers (1992), written and directed by Robert Sarkies.

Petherbridge appeared in two episodes of Beyond the Law for TVNZ, in one of which she played con-artist Amy Bock, a.k.a. 'Percy Redwood'.

== Death ==
Petherbridge died at her home in Dunedin, on 18 January 2024, at the age of 92.

== Honours and awards ==
In the 2000 Queen's Birthday Honours, Petherbridge was appointed a Companion of the Queen's Service Order for community service. In 2012, she received a lifetime achievement award at the Dunedin Theatre Awards. In 2014, she was awarded a New Zealand Theatre Services honour medal.
