= Terry MacTavish =

Actor and drama teacher in New Zealand

Terry MacTavish MNZM
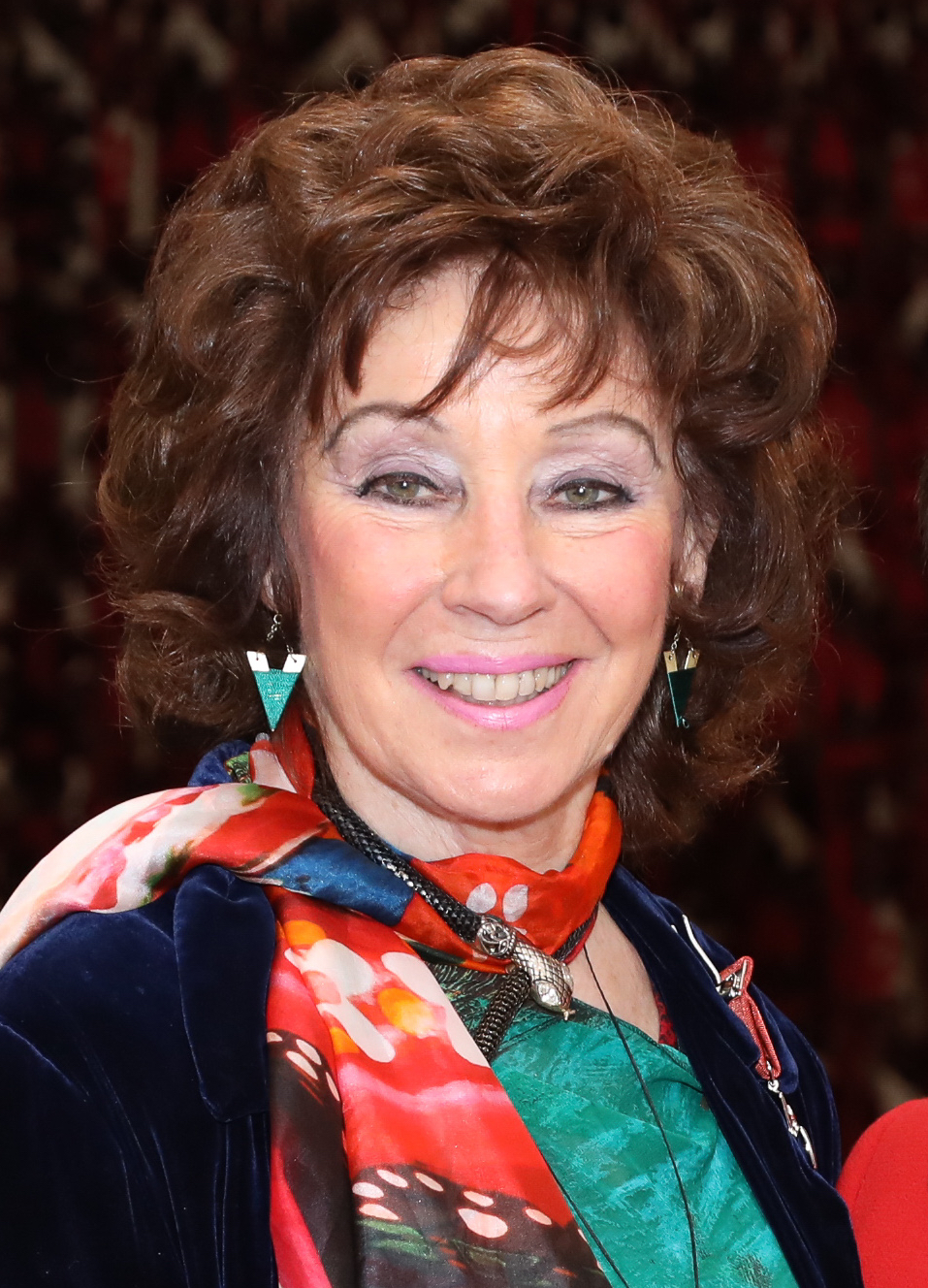
- MacTavish on her investiture as MNZM in April 2019
- Born: Terry Isobel MacTavish; 1950 (age 75–76); Taiwan
- Occupations: Actress, drama teacher
- Employer: Queen's High School, Dunedin
- Relatives: Shona Dunlop MacTavish (mother); Bonar Dunlop (uncle); Jocelyn Ryburn (aunt)

Terry Isobel MacTavish MNZM (born 1950) is an actress and teacher from Dunedin, New Zealand.

== Early life and family ==
MacTavish was born in Taiwan in 1950, where her parents MacDonald MacTavish, a Scottish Free Church minister, and Shona Dunlop MacTavish, were working at the English Presbyterian Church Mission in Tainan. Her mother taught English and ballet to the local children. The family later moved to South Africa, where MacTavish's parents worked as missionaries: her father died there in 1957, and she returned to New Zealand with her mother and two siblings to live in Dunedin.

== Career ==
MacTavish's acting career started with the Southern Players at age 18. She went on to perform in productions at the Globe Theatre and the Fortune Theatre.

For 47 years MacTavish taught at Queen's High School, Dunedin, including being head of drama. She was part of the educational group that developed drama in a new arts curriculum in New Zealand including establishing drama as an NCEA subject.

MacTavish was also part of Allen Hall at the University of Otago in the 1960s.

In 2008, MacTavish and Ross Johnston revived a play they had performed in 1975 at the Fortune Theatre, Pinter's Old Times, directed by Lisa Warrington. MacTavish's 1975 performance had been described as "dark, textured and petulant", while her 2008 interpretation of Anna was "sophisticated and mysterious".

In 2011, she played the "flamboyant medium" Madame Arcati, in Noël Coward's Blithe Spirit at the Globe Theatre, Dunedin.

In May 2013, MacTavish and emerita Professor Jocelyn Harris presented Women Behaving Badly, a selection of readings from Jane Austen, at the Globe.

One reviewer called MacTavish's performance as Elizabeth I in Friedrich Schiller's Mary Stuart at the Globe in 2016 "mesmerising".

== Honours and awards ==
In the 2019 New Year Honours, MacTavish was appointed a Member of the New Zealand Order of Merit, for services to theatre and education. In 2021, she was recognised as a distinguished alumna of Columba College.
