= John Dunlop (chess player) =

New Zealand chess player

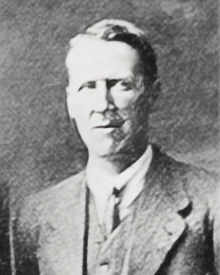
- Dunlop in 1921

Personal information
- Full name: John Boyd Dunlop
- Born: 30 October 1884 Dundee, Scotland
- Died: 29 October 1973 (aged 88) Auckland, New Zealand
- Occupation: Dentist
- Spouse: Ailsa Eleanor Ormond Vallange (m. 1912; died 1955)
- Relatives: Bonar Dunlop (nephew); Jocelyn Ryburn (niece); Shona Dunlop MacTavish (niece)

Sport
- Country: New Zealand
- Sport: Chess

Achievements and titles
- National finals: Champion: 1921, 1922, 1923, 1934, 1939, 1940

John Boyd Dunlop (30 October 1884 – 29 October 1973) was a New Zealand chess player. He won the New Zealand Chess Championship six times between 1921 and 1940, and was the first player to win the title in three consecutive years.

== Early life and family ==
Born in Dundee, Scotland, on 30 October 1884, Dunlop was the son of the Reverend John Dunlop and Jane Dunlop (née Wallace). His father was a Presbyterian minister and when he was appointed to the chair of theology at Theological Hall, Dunedin, in 1887, the family migrated to New Zealand.

Dunlop undertook dental studies in London, and while there he learned to play chess, before returning to New Zealand in 1906, and going into practice as a dentist in Dunedin. He moved to Nelson in mid 1911, where he went into practice with G. F. Dodds.

On 26 February 1912, Dunlop married Ailsa Vallange at St John's Church, in the Dunedin suburb of Roslyn. The couple made their first home together in Nelson, before moving to Oamaru later in 1912. They returned to live in Dunedin in 1928.

== Chess ==
Dunlop joined the Otago Chess Club in Dunedin in about 1908, and won the Otago junior chess championship in 1909. He won the senior provincial championship the following year, and finished fourth at the 1911 New Zealand championship.

Dunlop joined the Oamaru Chess Club in 1912. He was Oamaru club champion from 1913 to 1917.

Dunlop entered the 1914 national chess championship, but withdrew before the start of the tournament because of a family illness. He next competed at the New Zealand championship in 1921, and won the tournament after a play-off. He won the national championship the following year, and again in 1923, after a playoff, becoming the first person to win the title three times in a row. After winning his third consecutive national title, Dunlop's play was described in a newspaper report:

"He looks very deeply into the complicated positions arising from time to time, and rarely fails to take an immediate advantage of the slightest slip by an opponent. His moves are well timed, and frequently an admirable combination of attack and defence. His play is at all times attractive, and he is in every way a worthy champion."

Dunlop was fifth at the 1924 New Zealand national championship, third in 1926, and third in 1927. He next competed at the national tournament in 1934, winning the event in a playoff. The following year, Dunlop placed fourth at the national championship, and then in 1938 he was runner-up. He competed at two further New Zealand national championships, in 1939 and 1940, winning both. In all, Dunlop contested 12 New Zealand championships, winning on six occasions.

Dunlop played in the 1933 Australian Chess Championship in Sydney, but was on poor form and was never in contention for the title.

In 1955, Dunlop was awarded the title of New Zealand chess master by the New Zealand Chess Association.

== Later life and death ==
Dunlop was predeceased by his wife, Ailsa Dunlop, in 1955. He died in Auckland on 29 October 1973, at the age of 88.
