= Moray Place, Dunedin =

Street in Dunedin, Otago Region, New Zealand

Coordinates: 45.875350°S 170.502393°E

Moray Place
- Interactive map of Moray Place
- Maintained by: Dunedin City Council
- Location: central Dunedin, New Zealand
- Postal code: 9016
- Anticlockwise end: Princes Street
- Major junctions: Upper Stuart Street; George Street; Lower Stuart Street
- Clockwise end: Princes Street

Central Dunedin. Moray Place is the large octagonal street marked in red (numbered 3)

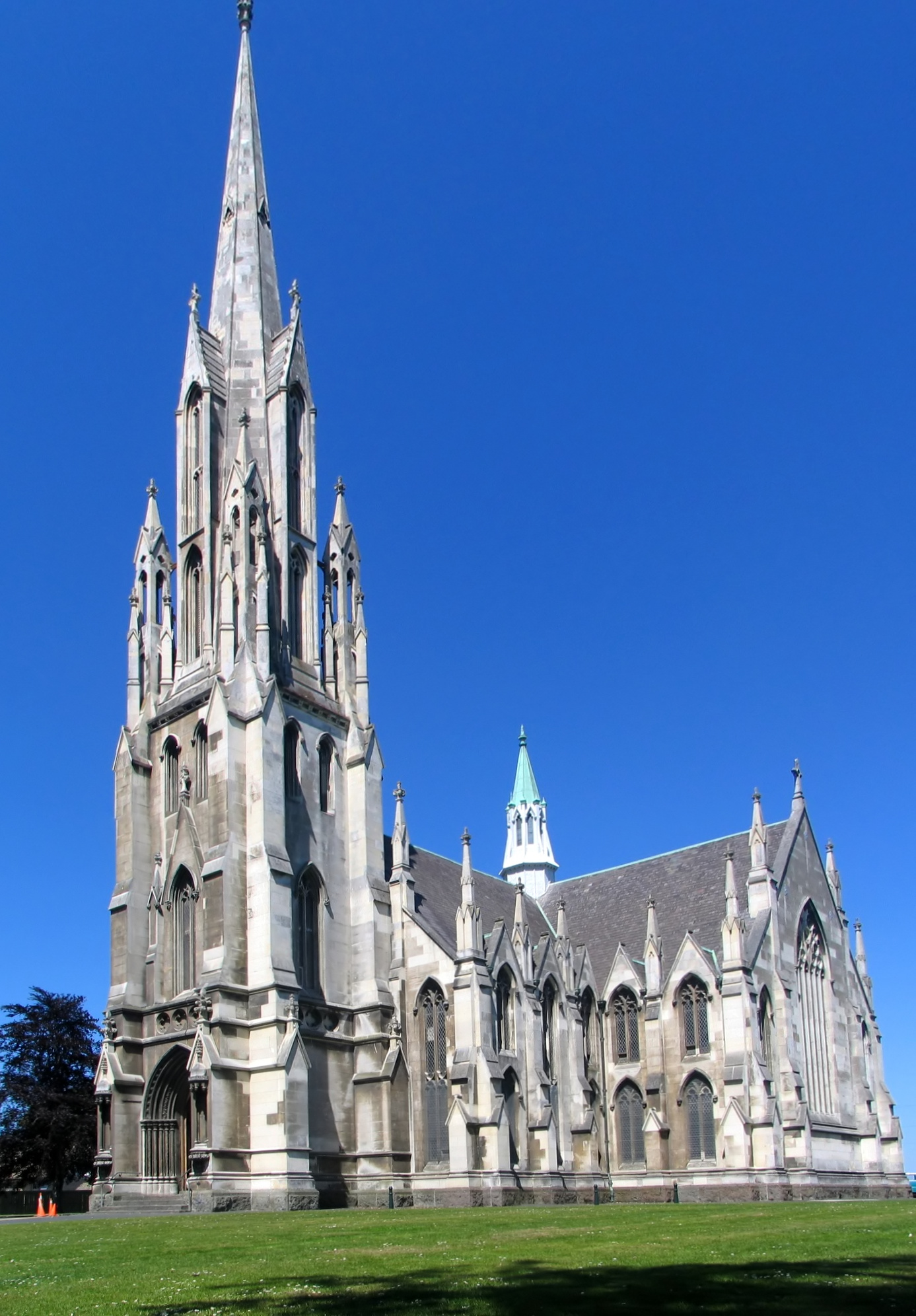
First Church, located on Moray Place's southeastern quadrant

Moray Place is an octagonal street which surrounds the city centre of Dunedin, Otago, New Zealand. The street is intersected by Stuart Street (to the east and west), Princes Street (to the south) and George Street (to the north). Like many streets in Dunedin, it is named for a street in the Scottish capital Edinburgh (Dùn Èideann itself is the Gaelic name of its Scottish sister city).

== Location and layout ==
The northeastern quadrant between George Street and Lower Stuart Street is flat, but the other three quadrants slope considerably, especially the southeastern and northwestern quadrants.

Many of Dunedin's major inner city buildings are located on Moray Place. These include Dunedin Municipal Chambers, Dunedin Public Library, and the grounds of St. Paul's Anglican Cathedral, which lie within the northwestern quadrant between Moray Place and the City Centre (The Octagon).

The southwestern quadrant includes the former Dunedin Public Library building (the Carnegie Centre), the former Fortune Theatre (in the old Trinity Methodist Church building), and one of the city's main cinemas, the Rialto. This quadrant is regarded as part of the heart of Dunedin's art district, and has in the past contained numerous galleries, one of which was housed in the city's original synagogue. There are still currently two galleries in this quadrant, and it also houses one of the city's main live music venues, the Dog With Two Tails cafe and bar.

The southeastern quadrant is dominated by First Church, which sits atop the remnants of Bell Hill, the top of which was lowered to allow for First Church's construction. A plaque marks the site of Atahapara, the home and private museum of Thomas Hocken, which was located in this quadrant of Moray Place at the top of the steep, historic Burlington Street. The offices of Taylormade Media were also located in this quadrant until the early 2000s, and the regional offices of the Automobile Association.

The northeastern quadrant is part of Dunedin's central retail precinct, and includes the southern end of the Dunedin central bus hub, at the junction with Great King Street.

== History ==
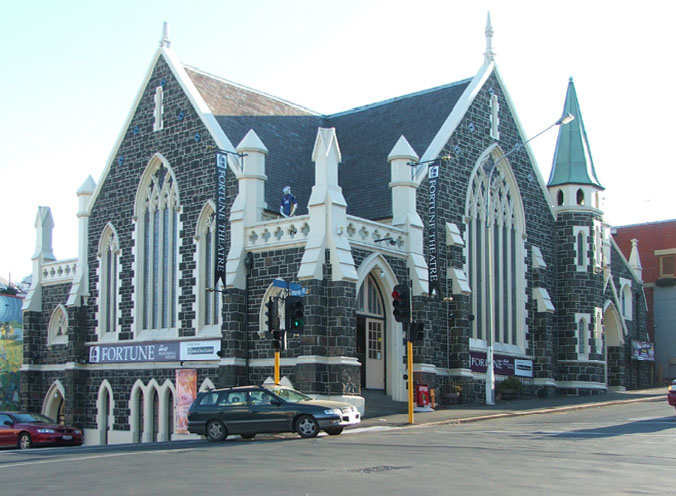
The Fortune Theatre, in the former Holy Trinity Methodist Church, on the corner of Moray Place and Upper Stuart Street.

The centre of Dunedin was first laid out by surveyor Charles Kettle during the 1840s. An initial obstacle to the development of the city was Bell Hill, a large outcrop situated where the southeastern quadrant of Moray Place now lies. This effectively split the early settlement of Dunedin in two, and for the first few years of settlement, a cutting through the hill was the only land route between the parts of the town to the north and south. The hill was quarried during the 1850s, providing building material for many of the city's early buildings.

Kettle's initial plan may have been for the entire area within Moray Place to be a public reserve. This did not come to pass, and it was only through Kettle's direct intervention that the central part of the Octagon itself was not built on. As it is, the buildings between Moray Place and The Octagon include many of Dunedin's most prominent structures, and - though it may not have been Kettle's original intention - the concentric octagons of Moray Place and The Octagon are now undeniably the city's centre.

In 1897, a fire station was built on Moray Place, located between the Municipal Chambers and St Paul's Cathedral. It was located here for accessibility to the city, but was moved just 14 years later in 1911 because the new motor engines used on the trucks woke residents and caused complaints as they went through the town on callouts. A larger building was also needed to house new equipment. The original building has long since been demolished and a car park now exists on that site.

== Historic buildings ==
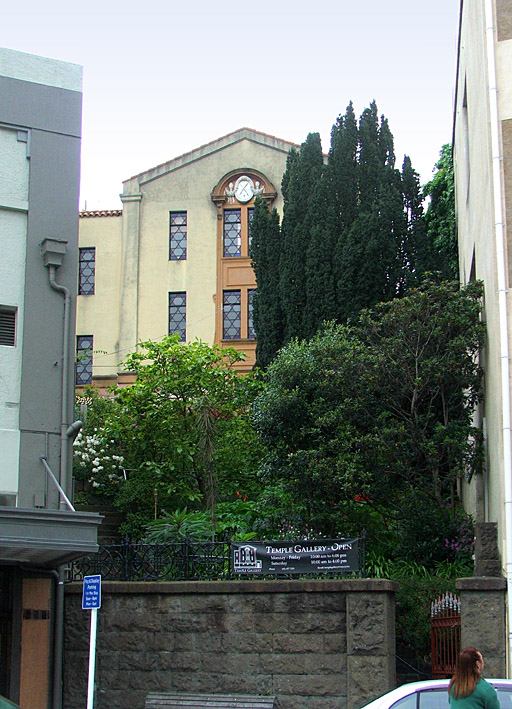
Dunedin's former synagogue, until recently used as an art gallery.

Several buildings in Moray Place have Category I or Category II Historic Place classification by Heritage New Zealand. Clockwise from Princes Street, these include the Savoy Restaurant building (I), St James Theatre building (I), former Dunedin Synagogue (I), Moray Terrace (II), former Congregational Church (II), Carnegie Centre (former Public Library) (II), York and Kirkwood Houses (II), former Holy Trinity Methodist Church (I), Stephens Inks building (II), Otago Pioneer Women's Memorial Hall (I), Security Building (II), and First Church (I).

In addition, Burlington Street, a short, steep street which leads off Moray Place next to First Church, and its environs are classified as a historic precinct, and both St. Paul's Cathedral and the Dunedin Municipal Chambers are Category I historic places with access off Moray Place.
