= John Drummond (musicologist) =

New Zealand composer and academic (born 1944)

John Drummond (born 1944, Lancaster, Lancashire) is a New Zealand musicologist, academic, and composer.

== Academic career ==
Drummond graduated with a BA (Hons) and BMus from Leeds University before completing his PhD at Birmingham University. He was Haywood Research Fellow at the University of Birmingham in 1969 and then lecturer in music there from 1970 to 1976. In 1976 he took up his appointment as Blair Professor of Music at the University of Otago a post he held until his retirement in 2014. From 2002 to 2006 he was Dean of the School of Language, Literature and Performing Arts at Otago, from 2006 to 2009 Associate Dean (Academic) in the Division of Humanities, and from 2010 to 2011 Humanities Ambassador for the University. Drummond was a visiting professor at Leeds University in 1995 and in 2009 at the University of Washington School of Music, Queensland Conservatorium of Music, Malmo Conservatory of Music and Dartington College of Arts. He is currently emeritus professor of music at the University of Otago.

== Life in music ==
Drummond served as President of the New Zealand Society for Music Education (now Music Education New Zealand Aotearoa) from 1989 to 1999 and was awarded Life Membership. From 1997 to 1999 he was a member of the New Zealand Qualifications Authority Panel that devised Unit Standards in Music. From 2005 until its merger with the Royal Society Drummond was a member of the NZ Council for Humanities. In 2007-2008 he co-authored for the Ministry of Research, Science and Technology and the Ministry of Culture a report, Culture Matters, on funding for cultural activity in NZ.

In 1989 Drummond joined by invitation the Community Music Activity Commission of the International Society for Music Education and was its chair from 1993 to 1995. In 1997 he joined the ISME Board and was the first elected President in 1999, serving from 2001 to 2003. From 2002 to 2006 he was involved in the International Music Council’s ManyMusics Project, and from 2004 to 2010 regularly attended conferences of the Cultural Diversity in Music Education network. From 1998 to 2004 he was a member of the international strategic advisory group for the World Music Centre Project eventually located in Rotterdam, Holland. From 2009 to 2012 he led a research project on the Future of Western Opera for the Sustainable Futures for Music Cultures Project based at the Queensland Conservatorium of Music.

Drummond’s academic publications include Opera in Perspective (1980, J.M.Dent and Sons Ltd and the University of Minnesota Press), and many articles in music education publications. He is known for sharing provocative ideas. His series of broadcasts for Radio New Zealand in 1988 entitled Planetary Airs proposed that the pathway in contemporary music pioneered by Arnold Schoenberg and his disciples was an unimportant byway (a view now widely shared), while his May 2010 article in the International Journal for Music Education proposed that Western Art Music should be renamed Northwest Asian Court Music.

== Life in opera ==
Drummond has been involved in opera for over fifty years. He has directed over 40 productions, edited 16 opera for performance, and translated 20 works. He is also New Zealand's most prolific opera composer and one of its most successful ones, having written nine one-act works (eight performed, three in multiple productions) and seven full-length works (all performed, one in multiple productions). His edition of William Shield's "Rosina" was published by Musica Britannica in 1998 and his reconstruction of Mozart's "Zaide" with Richard Rastall and Jane Oakshott (1988) was performed by City Opera Vancouver in 2016.

His full-length operas include

Happy Arcadia a setting of a play by W.S.Gilbert with music in imitation of Arthur Sullivan (1975)

Plague Upon Eyam (1983), libretto by Patrick Little

The Birds (1986), based upon Aristophanes' comedy, libretto by the composer

The Stars in Orion (1999), for Opera Otago, libretto by Patrick Little

Larnach (2007), for Opera Otago, libretto by the composer

A Schoolgirl Revolution (2011), commissioned by the Children's Opera of Prague, libretto by Jeremy Commons

War Hero (2017), for Opera Otago libretto by the composer

Three of these operas have New Zealand subjects. "The Stars in Orion" is based on the story of Bully Hayes at the Otago goldfields; "Larnach" tells the story of the man who built Larnach's Castle and who committed suicide in Parliament Buildings in Wellington; "War Hero" tells the story of World War 1 conscientious objector Archie Baxter.

His short operas include

The Hawkeyed Sentinel, (1969) from a comic play by Cervantes, libretto by the composer

Mr Polly at the Potwell Inn (2000), from H.G.Wells, for Sirius Opera, libretto by Jeremy Commons

A Beleaguered City (2002), for Sirius Opera, libretto by Jeremy Commons

Bridge to Somewhere (2002), for Otago Festival of the Arts, libretto by Nigel Eastgate

Marriage a la Mode (2004), from a Katherine Mansfield story, for Sirius Opera, libretto by Jeremy Commons

Impersonating Maurice(2005)/Dearest Maurice(2016), for Sirius Opera, libretto by Jeremy Commons

Mrs Windermere (2005), for Sirius Opera, libretto by Jeremy Commons

The Genteel Pigeons (2006), for Sirius Opera, libretto by Jeremy Commons

The Illustrious Stranger (2015), winner of the Opera Factory new opera contest, 2016. libretto by the composer

== Selected other works for the theatre ==
- Goethe's Faust (complete incidental music for parts 1 and 2)
- And Grandmother Played Bridge (lyrics and music for a masque by Louise Petherbridge and Shona MacTavish)
- Orlando (music and lyrics for a masque by Louise Petherbridge and Shona McTavish)
- The Mozart Harlequin (a reconstruction of Mozart's 'Music for a Pantomime' KV 446)
- Narcissus, (for male dancer and brass quintet)

== Selected other works ==
- Baa, Baa, Dunkelschaf (cantata)
- Cantata Clementina (based on the folksong, in a range of styles, for four sopranos, baritone and piano)
- Christmas Bells (four carols for children's voices with piano)
- The Dawning Of The Year (11 poems for soprano, baritone and piano)
- The Journey Home (for soprano, tenor, baritone, choir and orchestra)
- Meteorological Fugue (SATB choir, spoken in rhythm until the last phrase)
- Sonata for Oboe and Piano
