= Joseph Musaphia =

New Zealand writer and actor

- Born: Joseph Musaphia; 1935 (age 90–91); London United Kingdom
- Occupation: playwright

Joseph Musaphia (born 1935) is a New Zealand writer and actor who was born in London.

== Biography ==
Joseph Musaphia was born in 1935 in London and he has Portuguese ancestry. He moved with his family to Melbourne, Australia and lived there from 1938 until 1946 when they moved to Christchurch, New Zealand. He attended Christchurch Boys' High School and left age 15. He spent three years as an apprentice motor mechanic until he switched to art and cartooning, working in commercial art for ten years. Over a period of three years, while we was in his early twenties his cartoons were published weekly in The Listener magazine.

Musaphia started writing and acting for stage, screen and radio after his first play was produced by the New Zealand Theatre Company in 1961. He was inspired to write after attending the Unity Theatre production of Look Back In Anger by John Osborne.

In 1971 Musaphia and Roger Hall won a Logie Award for best television comedy, Australia A – Z.

The play Mother and Fathers first presented in 1975 at the Fortune Theatre in Dunedin also had presentations in at the Court Theatre and Downstage in Wellington. Musaphia acted in the early productions. It was so popular in Wellington it transferred to the much larger theatre the Opera House for three nights. In 1979 he received the first Victoria University of Wellington Writer's Fellowship.

Circa Theatre chose the Musaphia play Mates to celebrate their tenth year in 1986 and it was directed and starred Ray Henwood. Musaphia wrote his first novel in 1997, has been a columnist for The Evening Post in Wellington, and continues to write stage and radio plays.

== Stage Plays ==
- 1971 – The Guerilla
- 1973 – Victims - premiered at Downstage 1973
- 1974 – Obstacles - premiered at Downstage 1974
- 1975 - Mother and Fathers - premiered at the Fortune Theatre, revised in 2005
- 1980 - Hunting - premiered at Circa Theatre
- 1983 - A Fair Go For Charlie Wellman
- 1983 - The Plague
- 1986 - Mates - premiered at Circa Theatre
- 1988 - The New Zealander - premiered at the Fortune Theatre
- 2018 – Problems - premiered at Circa Theatre

== Radio Plays ==
- 1976 – Flotsam and Jetsum (NZBC)
- 1976 – The Guerilla (NZBC)
- 1976 – Never Let it Be Said (NZBC)
- 1978 – Just Desserts (NZBC)
- 1979 – Mind Jogging (NZBC)
- 1985 – Mothers and Fathers (RNZ)

== Film and television ==
- 2019 – Funny As: The Story of New Zealand Comedy, Subject – Television
- 1986 – Between the Lines, Writer – Television
- 1983 – Comedy Playhouse, Writer – Television
- 1975 – 1976, Today at One, Writer, Actor – Television
- 1974 – 1975, Buck House, Writer – Television
- 1973, Richard John Seddon - Premier, Actor – Television
- 1971, Noel Ferrier's Australia A-Z, Writer – Television
- 1969 – 1970, In View of the Circumstances, Actor, Writer – Television
- 1967 – 1968, Joe's World – Presenter, Writer – Television
- 1966 – Don’t Let It Get You – film
