= Campbell Thomas =

New Zealand theatre director, designer, and artist (1935–2019)

Campbell Thomas MNZM
- Born: John Campbell Thomas; 7 August 1935; Hamilton, New Zealand
- Died: 22 December 2019 (aged 84); Oamaru, New Zealand
- Occupation: Theatre director
- Years active: 1964–1999

John Campbell Thomas MNZM (7 August 1935 – 22 December 2019) was a New Zealand theatre director, designer and artist. He worked in the United States, primarily at the Dallas Theater Center in Texas, from 1964 to 1984, before returning to New Zealand where he was artistic director at the Fortune Theatre, Dunedin, between 1985 and 1999.

== Early life and education ==
Thomas was born in Hamilton on 7 August 1934, and was educated at Auckland Grammar School. He worked initially as a bacteriologist, dabbling in amateur theatre where he met his actress wife Jacque in an Auckland Repertory production of The Crucible.

== Work ==
In 1964, Thomas went to the United States to train and subsequently work at the Dallas Theater Center. Apart from briefly returning to Christchurch in 1967 to work at the Canterbury Theatre Company, he remained in the United States for 20 years, in Dallas and, later, Arkansas and Florida.

Returning to New Zealand in 1985 to take up the position of artistic director of the Fortune Theatre in Dunedin, Thomas directed and designed over 90 productions between 1985 and 1999. These included world premieres of sundry plays and musicals by Roger Hall: Love Off the Shelf (1986), The Share Club (1987), After the Crash (1988), Mr Punch (1989), Making It Big (1991), By Degrees (1993), Social Climbers (1995), C'mon Black (1995), Dirty Weekends (1997) and The Book Club (1999).

During Thomas's years at the helm the Company aimed to bring to Dunedin audiences the best of contemporary English language drama from throughout the world. In 44 instances these were the first productions in New Zealand of these plays. In addition to British, Australian and Canadian works he put particular emphasis on American drama, frequently presenting off-Broadway and regional successes.

His one pre-20th century production was of the 1606 Jacobean satire, The Revenger's Tragedy, which received its New Zealand professional premiere at the Fortune in 1995 with the aid of a special grant from Creative New Zealand.

== Later life and death ==
In the 2001 New Year Honours, Thomas was appointed a Member of the New Zealand Order of Merit, for services to theatre.

In retirement, Thomas lived in North Otago. He engaged in wood sculpture, and the Moray Gallery in Dunedin hosted two exhibitions of his work. His wife, Jacque, died in 2008. Thomas died in Oamaru on 22 December 2019, aged 84.
