= Ghost Hunt (TV series) =

- Genre: Paranormal
- Starring: Carolyn Taylor; Michael Hallows; Brad Hills
- Opening theme: "Into The Ocean (Calling You)" by Evermore
- Country of origin: New Zealand
- Original language: English
- No. of series: 1
- No. of episodes: 10

Production
- Executive producer: Ross Jennings
- Editor: Kristen Leys
- Running time: 22 minutes per episode
- Production company: Screentime

Original release
- Network: TV2
- Release: 28 June 2005 – 2006

Ghost Hunt is a reality TV show from New Zealand. It is an investigating series in which a team of three investigators, Carolyn Taylor, Michael Hallows and Brad Hills, visited alleged haunted hotspots around New Zealand. It is currently aired in Europe on the channel Zone Reality.

== Episode structure ==
There were three main sections of every episode; first the team would look around the location during the daylight, then set up video cameras and temperature monitors just before dark for later use. The second section involved, at night, Michael and Carolyn entering the location again with only flashlights and photography equipment, their objective being to check temperatures that could indicate paranormal activity and take photographs in an attempt to capture images of ghosts and orbs. Before dawn, to start the third section, the pair would exit the location and meet with Brad in the Ghost Hunt vehicle, who would examine the evidence gathered by Michael and Carolyn, as well as discuss various findings that could be deemed evidence of haunting. It was left up to the viewer's own decision whether or not the evidence was trustworthy. The soundtrack theme for the show was "Into The Ocean (Calling You)" from the Evermore album Dreams.

== Episode list ==
- Episode One- Larnach Castle.
- Episode Two- Abandoned Psychiatric Hospital
- Episode Three- Waitomo Caves Hotel
- Episode Four- Fortune Theatre, Dunedin
- Episode Five- Riccarton House
- Episode Six- Whatipu
- Episode Seven- Vulcan Hotel
- Episode Eight- Waikamete Cemetery
- Episode Nine- St. James Theatre, Wellington
- Episode Ten- Kinder House and Ewelme Cottage

== Celebrity Ghost Hunt ==
There were two series of a celebrity version of the show.

== Cancellation ==
The show is no longer in production, despite a large following in the United Kingdom, and the fact that the series team had already prepared locations intended to be investigated in a second series.

Brad Hills stated in an interview that the producers of Ghost Hunt were planning on creating an Australian version of the show, but no such version has been made.

== Other media ==
A book to tie in with the series was released, named Ghost Hunt: True New Zealand Ghost Stories. The book is 171 pages long and split into ten chapters, each chapter correlating with an episode from the show; it features additional information on the locations visited and details of the investigation.

== See also ==
- List of ghost films
