= Dancing with the Stars (New Zealand TV series) series 8 =

Dancing with the Stars
- Season 8
- Celebrity winner: Manu Vatuvei
- Professional winner: Loryn Reynolds
- No. of episodes: 17

Release
- Original network: Three
- Original release: 14 April – 16 June 2019

Series chronology
- ← Previous; Season 7 Next → Series 9

The eighth series of Dancing with the Stars premiered on 14 April 2019 on Three, and is hosted by Dai Henwood and Sharyn Casey. Camilla Sacre-Dallerup, Julz Tocker, and Rachel White all returned as the series' judges, with Sacre-Dullerup serving as head judge again. The full cast was announced on 4 April.

== Cast ==
=== Couples ===
Celebrity	Notability	Professional partner	Status
Jude Dobson	Television presenter	Matt Tatton-Brown	Eliminated 1st on April 22, 2019
Carolyn Taylor	Former What Now presenter	Jonny Williams	Eliminated 2nd on April 29, 2019
Anna Willcox-Silfverberg	Olympic skier & television presenter	Brad Coleman	Eliminated 3rd on May 6, 2019
Mike McRoberts	Newshub broadcaster & journalist	Kristie Williams	Eliminated 4th on May 13, 2019
Walter Neilands	Former Sticky TV presenter	Melissa McCallum	Eliminated 5th on May 20, 2019
K'Lee	Singer & Mai FM radio presenter	Scott Cole	Eliminated 6th on May 27, 2019
Glen Osborne	Former All Blacks rugby player	Vanessa Cole	Eliminated 7th on June 3, 2019
Nadia Lim	Celebrity chef & entrepreneur	Aaron Gilmore	Eliminated 8th on June 10, 2019
William Waiirua	Social media star & singer	Amelia McGregor	Fourth Place on June 16, 2019
Clinton Randell	The Edge radio presenter	Brittany Coleman	Third Place on June 16, 2019
Laura Daniel	Comedian & actress	Shae Mountain	Runners-up on June 16, 2019
Manu Vatuvei	Former Warriors rugby league player	Loryn Reynolds	Winners on June 16, 2019

== Scorecard ==
Couple	Place	1	2	1+2	3	4	5	6	7	8	9	10	
Couple	Place	1	2	1+2	3	4	5	6	7	8	9	Top 4	Top 2
Manu & Loryn	1	20	23	43	22	24	20	24	27	26	27+28=55	29	+30=59
Laura & Shae	2	21	22	43	26	23	27	26	28	28	30+28=58	30	+30=60
Randell & Brittany	3	23	25	48	23	22	24	25	25	27	28+27=55	30	
William & Amelia	4	19	19	38	24	25	23	26	24	29	26+29=55	30	
Nadia & Aaron	5	17	18	35	20	19	21	22	24	23	23+24=47		
Glen & Vanessa	6	17	24	41	26	24	23	26	25	24			
K'Lee & Scott	7	18	17	35	19	21	18	20	22				
Walter & Melissa	8	12	15	27	16	13	15	15					
Mike & Kristie	9	19	18	37	19	18	19						
Anna & Brad	10	23	20	43	18	21							
Carolyn & Jonny	11	21	22	43	22								
Jude & Matt	12	14	18	32									

Red numbers indicate the couples with the lowest score for each week.
Green numbers indicate the couples with the highest score for each week.
indicates the couples eliminated that week.
indicates the returning couple that finished in the bottom two.
the returning couple that was the last to be called safe.
indicates the winning couple.
indicates the runner-up couple.
indicates the couple who placed third.
indicates the couple who placed fourth.

=== Average score chart ===
This table only counts for dances scored on a 30-point scale.

Rank by average	Place	Couple	Total points	Number of dances	Average
1	2	Laura & Shae	319	12	26.6
2	3	Randell & Brittany	279	11	25.4
3	1	Manu & Loryn	300	12	25.0
4	4	William & Amelia	274	11	24.9
5	6	Glen & Vanessa	189	8	23.6
6	11	Carolyn & Jonny	65	3	21.7
7	5	Nadia & Aaron	211	10	21.1
8	10	Anna & Brad	82	4	20.5
9	7	K'Lee & Scott	135	7	19.3
10	9	Mike & Kristie	93	5	18.6
11	12	Jude & Matt	32	2	16.0
12	8	Walter & Melissa	86	6	14.3

=== Highest and lowest scoring performances ===
The best and worst performances in each dance according to the judges' 30-point scale are as follows:

Dance	Highest scored dancer(s)	Highest score	Lowest scored dancer(s)	Lowest score
Cha-cha-cha	Clinton Randell	27	Walter Neilands	13
Jive	William Waiirua	29	Jude Dobson	14
Tango	Manu Vatuvei	29	Walter Neilands	15
Samba	Glen Osborne; William Waiirua	24	Walter Neilands	12
Quickstep	William Waiirua	29	Walter Neilands	16
Rumba	Manu Vatuvei	28	K'Lee	18
Foxtrot	Laura Daniel	28	Nadia Lim; Jude Dobson	18
Paso doble	Laura Daniel	30	Walter Neilands	15
Viennese waltz	Laura Daniel	30	Manu Vatuvei	23
Waltz	Clinton Randell	28	Glen Osborne	26
Salsa	Manu Vatuvei; Glen Osborne	24	Walter Neilands	15
Hip-hop	William Waiirua	30	William Waiirua	25
Argentine tango	Clinton Randell	27	Manu Vatuvei	24
Contemporary	Clinton Randell	25		
Freestyle	Manu Vatuvei; Laura Daniel	30		

=== Couples' highest and lowest scoring dances ===
Scores are based upon a potential 30-point maximum (team dances are excluded).

Couples	Highest scoring dance(s)	Lowest scoring dance(s)
Manu & Loryn	Freestyle (30)	Rumba; Cha-cha-cha (20)
Laura & Shae	Paso doble Viennese waltz Freestyle (30)	Cha-cha-cha (21)
Randell & Brittany	Quickstep (30)	Salsa (22)
William & Amelia	Hip-hop (30)	Jive; Tango (19)
Nadia & Aaron	Quickstep; Foxtrot (24)	Samba (17)
Glen & Vanessa	Waltz; Foxtrot (26)	Tango (17)
K'Lee & Scott	Jive (22)	Cha-cha-cha (17)
Walter & Melissa	Quickstep (16)	Samba (12)
Mike & Kristie	Foxtrot; Rumba; Tango (19)	Paso doble Cha-cha-cha (18)
Anna & Brad	Tango (23)	Paso doble (18)
Carolyn & Jonny	Tango; Foxtrot (22)	Cha-cha-cha (21)
Jude & Matt	Foxtrot (18)	Jive (14)

== Weekly scores ==
Individual judges' scores in the charts below (given in parentheses) are listed in this order from left to right: Rachel White, Camilla Sacre-Dallerup, Julz Tocker.

=== Week 1 ===
All voting proceeds from this week went to the Our People, Our City Fund to help support the families and Muslim communities impacted by the Christchurch mosque shootings. From the second week onwards, all proceeds went to the celebrity contestant's charity of choice.

Running order (Night 1)

Couple	Score	Dance	Music
Laura & Shae	21 (7, 7, 7)	Cha-cha-cha	"Hotter than Hell" — Dua Lipa
Glen & Vanessa	17 (6, 6, 5)	Tango	"Poi E" — Patea Māori Club
Jude & Matt	14 (5, 5, 4)	Jive	"Whip It" — Devo
Carolyn & Jonny	21 (7, 7, 7)	Cha-cha-cha	"Sax" — Fleur East
William & Amelia	19 (6, 7, 6)	Jive	"Wake Me Up Before You Go-Go" — Wham!
Walter & Melissa	12 (4, 4, 4)	Samba	"Sorry" — Justin Bieber
Nadia & Aaron	17 (5, 6, 6)	Samba	"The Greatest" — Sia featuring Kendrick Lamar

Running order (Night 2)

Couple	Score	Dance	Music
Randell & Brittany	23 (7, 8, 8)	Quickstep	"Freedom" — Pharrell Williams
Manu & Loryn	20 (6, 7, 7)	Rumba	"Stand by You" — Rachel Platten
K'Lee & Scott	18 (6, 6, 6)	Quickstep	"Can't Touch It" — Ricki-Lee Coulter
Anna & Brad	23 (7, 8, 8)	Tango	"Love Me Again" — John Newman
Mike & Kristie	19 (6, 6, 7)	Foxtrot	"Grace Kelly" — MIKA

=== Week 2: Top 40 Week ===
Running order (Night 1)

Couple	Score	Dance	Music	Result
William & Amelia	19 (6, 7, 6)	Tango	"Giant" — Calvin Harris and Rag'n'Bone Man	Safe
Laura & Shae	22 (7, 8, 7)	Rumba	"Shallow" — Lady Gaga and Bradley Cooper	Safe
Walter & Melissa	15 (5, 5, 5)	Paso doble	"Look What You Made Me Do" — Taylor Swift	Safe
Manu & Loryn	23 (7, 8, 8)	Viennese waltz	"You Don't Own Me" — Grace featuring G-Eazy	Safe
K'Lee & Scott	17 (5, 6, 6)	Cha-cha-cha	"What Lovers Do" — Maroon 5 featuring SZA	Last to be called safe
Nadia & Aaron	18 (6, 6, 6)	Foxtrot	"Hello" — Adele	Safe
Glen & Vanessa	24 (8, 8, 8)	Samba	"Free" — Broods	Safe

Running order (Night 2)

Couple	Score	Dance	Music	Result
Carolyn & Jonny	22 (7, 7, 8)	Tango	"Sweet but Psycho" — Ava Max	Safe
Jude & Matt	18 (6, 6, 6)	Foxtrot	"Can't Stop the Feeling!" — Justin Timberlake	Eliminated
Mike & Kristie	18 (6, 6, 6)	Paso doble	"Human" — Rag'n'Bone Man	Safe
Anna & Brad	20 (6, 7, 7)	Cha-cha-cha	"Never Be Like You" — Flume featuring Kai	Safe
Randell & Brittany	25 (8, 9, 8)	Viennese waltz	"You Are the Reason" — Calum Scott	Safe

=== Week 3: Guilty Pleasures Week ===
Running order (Night 1)

Couple	Score	Dance	Music	Result
Manu & Loryn	22 (7, 8, 7)	Tango	"Holding Out for a Hero" — Bonnie Tyler	Safe
Anna & Brad	18 (6, 6, 6)	Paso doble	"Mamma Mia" — ABBA	Safe
Walter & Melissa	16 (5, 5, 6)	Quickstep	"I'll Be There For You" — The Rembrandts	Safe
Mike & Kristie	19 (6, 7, 6)	Rumba	"Be Alright" — Dean Lewis	Safe
K'Lee & Scott	19 (6, 6, 7)	Samba	"Spice Up Your Life" — Spice Girls	Safe
Nadia & Aaron	20 (7, 6, 7)	Cha-cha-cha	"Cosmic Girl" — Jamiroquai	Last to be called safe
Randell & Brittany	23 (8, 8, 7)	Jive	"When You're Looking Like That" — Westlife	Safe

Running order (Night 2)

Couple	Score	Dance	Music	Result
William & Amelia	24 (8, 8, 8)	Cha-cha-cha	"Men in Black" — Will Smith	Safe
Laura & Shae	26 (8, 9, 9)	Tango	"Survivor" — Destiny's Child	Safe
Carolyn & Jonny	22 (8, 7, 7)	Foxtrot	"Man! I Feel Like a Woman!" — Shania Twain	Eliminated
Glen & Vanessa	26 (8, 9, 9)	Waltz	"Love Theme from Romeo and Juliet" — Henry Mancini	Safe

=== Week 4: Club Night ===
Running order (Night 1)

Couple	Score	Dance	Music	Result
Randell & Brittany	22 (7, 8, 7)	Salsa	"Yeah!" — Usher featuring Lil Jon and Ludacris	Safe
Anna & Brad	21 (7, 7, 7)	Quickstep	"Can't Hold Us" — Macklemore & Ryan Lewis featuring Ray Dalton	Eliminated
Laura & Shae	23 (7, 8, 8)	Samba	"Swalla" — Jason Derulo featuring Nicki Minaj and Ty Dolla $ign	Safe
Mike & Kristie	18 (6, 6, 6)	Cha-cha-cha	"One Kiss" — Calvin Harris and Dua Lipa	Safe
Nadia & Aaron	19 (6, 6, 7)	Tango	"Disturbia" — Rihanna	Safe
Walter & Melissa	13 (4, 4, 5)	Cha-cha-cha	"Finally" — CeCe Peniston	Safe
William & Amelia	25 (8, 8, 9)	Hip-hop	"Boogie Wonderland" — Earth, Wind & Fire	Safe

Running order (Night 2)

Couple	Score	Dance	Music	Result
Glen & Vanessa	24 (8, 8, 8)	Cha-cha-cha	"Place Your Hands" — Reef	Safe
K'Lee & Scott	21 (7, 7, 7)	Tango	"Lola's Theme" — The Shapeshifters	Bottom two
Manu & Loryn	24 (8, 8, 8)	Salsa	"Turn the Beat Around" — Vicki Sue Robinson	Safe

Judges' vote to save

- White: K'Lee & Scott
- Tocker: K'Lee & Scott
- Sacre-Dallerup: Did not vote, but would have voted to save K'Lee & Scott

=== Week 5: 80s Week ===
Running order (Night 1)

Couple	Score	Dance	Music	Result
Manu & Loryn	20 (7, 7, 6)	Cha-cha-cha	"Venus" — Shocking Blue	Safe
Nadia & Aaron	21 (7, 7, 7)	Rumba	"Take My Breath Away" — Berlin	Safe
Randell & Brittany	24 (8, 8, 8)	Cha-cha-cha	"It's Raining Men" — The Weather Girls	Safe
Walter & Melissa	15 (5, 5, 5)	Salsa	"All Night Long (All Night)" — Lionel Richie	Safe
K'Lee & Scott	18 (6, 6, 6)	Rumba	"Right Here Waiting" — Richard Marx	Safe
William & Amelia	23 (7, 8, 8)	Foxtrot	"Master Blaster (Jammin')" — Stevie Wonder	Bottom two

Running order (Night 2)

Couple	Score	Dance	Music	Result
Laura & Shae	27 (9, 9, 9)	Jive	"Footloose" — Kenny Loggins	Safe
Mike & Kristie	19 (7, 6, 6)	Tango	"Sweet Dreams (Are Made of This)" — Eurythmics	Eliminated
Glen & Vanessa	23 (8, 8, 7)	Quickstep	"Walking on Sunshine" — Katrina and the Waves	Safe

Judges' vote to save

- White: William & Amelia
- Tocker: William & Amelia
- Sacre-Dallerup: Did not vote, but would have voted to save William & Amelia

=== Week 6: Rock Week ===
Running order (Night 1)

Couple	Score	Dance	Music	Result
Randell & Brittany	25 (8, 8, 9)	Paso doble	"Enter Sandman" — Metallica	Safe
Manu & Loryn	24 (8, 8, 8)	Argentine tango	"Supermassive Black Hole" — Muse	Safe
Nadia & Aaron	22 (7, 7, 8)	Salsa	"I Love Rock 'n' Roll" — Arrows	Safe
William & Amelia	26 (8, 9, 9)	Rumba	"Numb" — Linkin Park	Safe
K'Lee & Scott	20 (6, 7, 7)	Paso doble	"Natural" — Imagine Dragons	Bottom two
Laura & Shae	26 (8, 9, 9)	Viennese waltz	"Iris" — Goo Goo Dolls	Safe

Running order (Night 2)

Couple	Score	Dance	Music	Result
Walter & Melissa	15 (5, 5, 5)	Tango	"It's My Life" — Bon Jovi	Eliminated
Glen & Vanessa	26 (8, 9, 9)	Foxtrot	"All I Want Is You" — U2	Safe

Judges' vote to save

- White: K'Lee & Scott
- Tocker: K'Lee & Scott
- Sacre-Dallerup: Did not vote, but would have voted to save K'Lee & Scott

=== Week 7: Rocketman Week ===
Running order (Night 1)

Couple	Score	Dance	Music	Result
Glen & Vanessa	25 (8, 8, 9)	Jive	"Saturday Night's Alright for Fighting" — Taron Egerton and Kit Connor	Safe
Laura & Shae	28 (9, 10, 9)	Foxtrot	"Your Song" — Taron Egerton	Bottom two
William & Amelia	24 (8, 8, 8)	Samba	"Bennie and the Jets" — Taron Egerton	Safe
Manu & Loryn	27 (9, 9, 9)	Foxtrot	"Don't Let the Sun Go Down on Me" — Taron Egerton and Celinde Schoenmaker	Safe

Running order (Night 2)

Couple	Score	Dance	Music	Result
Nadia & Aaron	24 (8, 8, 8)	Quickstep	"I'm Still Standing" — Taron Egerton	Safe
K'Lee & Scott	22 (7, 7, 8)	Jive	"Crocodile Rock" — Taron Egerton	Eliminated
Randell & Brittany	25 (9, 8, 8)	Contemporary	"Tiny Dancer" — Taron Egerton	Safe

Judges' vote to save

- White: Laura & Shae
- Tocker: Laura & Shae
- Sacre-Dallerup: Did not vote, but would have voted to save Laura & Shae

=== Week 8: Celebrity Trio Week ===
Running order (Night 1)

Couple	Score	Dance	Music	Guest Celebrity	Result
Nadia & Aaron	23 (7, 8, 8)	Paso doble	"Believer" — Imagine Dragons	Barbara Kendall | Season 5	Safe
Glen & Vanessa	24 (8, 8, 8)	Salsa	"Tequila" — The Champs	Chris Harris | Season 7	Eliminated
Manu & Loryn	26 (9, 9, 8)	Jive	"Dear Future Husband" — Meghan Trainor	Miriama Smith | Season 4	Bottom two
Laura & Shae	28 (9, 9, 10)	Quickstep	"Valerie" — Mark Ronson featuring Amy Winehouse	Ben Barrington | Season 6	Safe

Running order (Night 2)

Couple	Score	Dance	Music	Guest Celebrity	Result
William & Amelia	29 (9, 10, 10)	Quickstep	"Pencil Full of Lead" — Paolo Nutini	David Seymour | Season 7	Safe
Randell & Brittany	27 (9, 9, 9)	Argentine tango	"Bad Guy" — Billie Eilish	Shane Cameron | Season 6	Safe

Judges' vote to save

- White: Manu & Loryn
- Tocker: Glen & Vanessa
- Sacre-Dallerup: Manu & Loryn

=== Week 9: Semi-Final ===
Running order

Couple	Score	Dance	Music	Result
Manu & Loryn	27 (10, 9, 8)	Paso doble	"Smells Like Teen Spirit" — Nirvana	Safe
Manu & Loryn	28 (10, 9, 9)	Rumba	"Love Story" — Taylor Swift	Safe
William & Amelia	26 (8, 9, 9)	Argentine tango	"God's Plan" — Drake	Bottom two
William & Amelia	29 (9, 10, 10)	Jive	"Wagon Wheel" — Old Crow Medicine Show	Bottom two
Nadia & Aaron	23 (7, 8, 8)	Jive	"Call Me" — Blondie	Eliminated
Nadia & Aaron	24 (8, 8, 8)	Foxtrot	"Wicked Game" — Chris Isaak	Eliminated
Randell & Brittany	28 (10, 9, 9)	Waltz	"Skyfall" — Adele	Safe
Randell & Brittany	27 (9, 9, 9)	Cha-cha-cha	"Timber" — Pitbull featuring Kesha	Safe
Laura & Shae	30 (10, 10, 10)	Paso doble	"Judas" — Lady Gaga	Safe
Laura & Shae	28 (9, 10, 9)	Jive	"The Girl's Gone Wild" — Travis Tritt	Safe

Judges' vote to save

- White: William & Amelia
- Tocker: William & Amelia
- Sacre-Dallerup: Did not vote, but would have voted to save William & Amelia

=== Week 10: Final ===
Running order (Top 4)

Couple	Score	Dance	Music	Result
Manu & Loryn	29 (10, 10, 9)	Tango	"Holding Out for a Hero" — Bonnie Tyler	Safe
Randell & Brittany	30 (10, 10, 10)	Quickstep	"Freedom" — Pharrell Williams	Third Place
Laura & Shae	30 (10, 10, 10)	Viennese waltz	"Iris" – Goo Goo Dolls	Safe
William & Amelia	30 (10, 10, 10)	Hip-hop	"Boogie Wonderland" — Earth, Wind & Fire	Fourth Place

Running order (Top 2)

Couple	Score	Dance	Music	Result
Manu & Loryn	30 (10, 10, 10)	Freestyle	"Everybody Wants to Rule the World" — Lorde	Winners
Laura & Shae	30 (10, 10, 10)	Freestyle	"Pound the Alarm" — Nicki Minaj	Runners-up

== Dance chart ==
Highest scoring dance
Lowest scoring dance

Couple	1	2	3	4	5	6	7	8	9		10	
Manu & Loryn	Rumba	Viennese waltz	Tango	Salsa	Cha-cha-cha	Argentine tango	Foxtrot	Jive	Paso doble	Rumba	Tango	Freestyle
Laura & Shae	Cha-cha-cha	Rumba	Tango	Samba	Jive	Viennese waltz	Foxtrot	Quickstep	Paso doble	Jive	Viennese waltz	Freestyle
Randell & Brittany	Quickstep	Viennese waltz	Jive	Salsa	Cha-cha-cha	Paso doble	Contemporary	Argentine tango	Waltz	Cha-cha-cha	Quickstep	
William & Amelia	Jive	Tango	Cha-cha-cha	Hip-hop	Foxtrot	Rumba	Samba	Quickstep	Argentine tango	Jive	Hip-hop	
Nadia & Aaron	Samba	Foxtrot	Cha-cha-cha	Tango	Rumba	Salsa	Quickstep	Paso doble	Jive	Foxtrot		
Glen & Vanessa	Tango	Samba	Waltz	Cha-cha-cha	Quickstep	Foxtrot	Jive	Salsa				
K'Lee & Scott	Quickstep	Cha-cha-cha	Samba	Tango	Rumba	Paso doble	Jive					
Walter & Melissa	Samba	Paso doble	Quickstep	Cha-cha-cha	Salsa	Tango						
Mike & Kristie	Foxtrot	Paso doble	Rumba	Cha-cha-cha	Tango							
Anna & Brad	Tango	Cha-cha-cha	Paso doble	Quickstep								
Carolyn & Jonny	Cha-cha-cha	Tango	Foxtrot									
Jude & Matt	Jive	Foxtrot										
