= Brian McNeill (playwright) =

New Zealand playwright and actor

Brian McNeill (born 1939) is a New Zealand playwright, actor and director.

== Early life and career ==
McNeill was born in New Plymouth in 1939. As McNeill says, he: "received the inspiration for his acting career in the form of a vision of Henry Irving in The Bells. He interrupted his studies at Auckland University to go on the stage." At the age of 18, he played his first professional role as The Boy in Waiting For Godot, directed by Ronald Barker for Auckland's CAS Theatre in 1958. The production toured the North Island of New Zealand, and was controversial. "Dozens walked out at every performance. Local and national dailies gave us front-page coverage. The local ladies' guilds clothed themselves in the role of the Lord Chamberlain, and petitions and complaints flooded Government House, Wellington. The Prime Minister was informed, decided to see it for himself, but understandably pulled out at the last minute. The censorial task was delegated to one of his right-hand men - I think it was possibly the Minister for Housing. This gentleman, much to our delight, passed it as being amusing and thought-provoking, whilst the papers hit at it as being shocking and loathsome...." However the New Zealand Herald called it "a brilliant and devastating piece of theatre."

After appearing in the CAS tour of Playboy of the Western World, McNeill went to Australia in 1960 and spent two years touring shortened versions of Shakespeare's plays to schools as part of the Australian Elizabethan Theatre Trust company, under director Hugh Hunt. From there he went to England in 1962, where he worked as an actor and director until 1973, appearing mainly in weekly and fortnightly Repertory, but also participating in national tours, such as a 1968 production of Jane Austen's Emma, adapted for the stage by Robert Owen, in which he played Mr Elton. He took over the lead role from actor Tony Booth in a thriller - The Murder Game - at the Wimbledon Theatre when Booth was contracted to open in another play on the same night. He was a volunteer performer in Yoko Ono's short work Film No 4 (1966). He formed his own theatre company in London, The Grand Guignol Players, and also directed short plays at Soho's Basement Theatre. In late 1972, he returned to New Zealand, where he directed the first production of The Two Tigers, and then spent a year as resident writer and actor at Centrepoint Theatre, Palmerston North.

== Plays ==
- The Two Tigers (1973), a play based on the relationship of Katherine Mansfield and John Middleton Murry. This was first produced at Central Theatre, Auckland in May 1973, directed by McNeill, and featuring Margaret Blay and Raymond Hawthorne as Mansfield and Murry. It went on to receive many productions in New Zealand, and also in Sydney, Melbourne, London (Hampstead Theatre), San Francisco (Julian Theatre) and New York City (Shandol Theatre). In 1977, the play was published by Price Milburn (NZ)
- A Most Natural Man (1973), a piece about John Constable, commissioned to run alongside an exhibition of the artist's work.
- Hand Erotic Moves Divine (1977) an audio-visual work commissioned by the Manawatu Art Gallery, which McNeill said "brings together the sensual functions the hands, their use in worship and prayer, and their part in giving and creating."
- The Naval Officer (1979). Commissioned by Auckland’s Mercury Theatre to mark the bicentenary of Captain Cook's final voyage and death in 1779. Called by The Auckland Star ‘the most ambitious, most complex and probably the most costly New Zealand play to date.'
- The Flower Show (1977) - a two-hander about the history of gardening, first performed (by McNeill and Sheila Summers) at the New Independent Theatre in Auckland, and revived in Dunedin in 1999, with Hilary Norris playing the wife's role.
- Smelter Skelter (1980), a play for children which attracted controversy before it even began rehearsal at the Fortune Theatre. A current 'hot topic' was the site of a proposed local aluminium smelter. For example, a letter to the Otago Daily Times, written before the play was actually produced, claimed "The story is not holiday fun but a carefully orchestrated brainwashing campaign that uses the youthful innocence of children". McNeill refuted this.
- Twin Messiahs (1982), a satirical comedy commissioned by the Court Theatre, Christchurch, directed by Yvette Bromley, and starring Elizabeth Moody and Jonathan Elsom.
- The Perfumed Business Woman (1982), commissioned by Louise Petherbridge - a solo play about Mata Hari.
- The Ladies' Man (1988), a full-length play on John Middleton Murry, given a rehearsed reading in Auckland.
- What An Exhibition! (2000). McNeill wrote and directed this play about the New Zealand and South Seas Exhibition of 1925 for the Fortune Theatre, alongside a docudrama about the Exhibition's architect, Edmund Anscombe, called I the Originator, I the Architect.

== Later career ==
From his return to New Zealand until about 2020, McNeill maintained an acting career, appearing in theatres throughout the country. Appearances included roles in: Pinter's The Birthday Party (Centrepoint Theatre, 1976, dir. Murray Lynch), Da by Hugh Leonard (Fortune Theatre 1986, dir. Campbell Thomas), in which he played the title role, Sylvia by A.R. Gurney (Fortune Theatre, 1996), Uncle Vanya by Chekhov (Court Theatre, 1991, dir. Elric Hooper), and A Streetcar Named Desire (Fortune Theatre, 2008, dir. Jef Hall-Flavin), amongst many others.

He held a QEII Arts Council writer's award in 1979.

In 1988, he was appointed writer in residence (a one-year residency) at the University of Canterbury.

In September 1990, McNeill became artistic director for the Northland Youth Theatre in Whangārei, a position he held until 1993.

Between 2010 and 2021, McNeill had an annual gig re-telling ghost stories at Dunedin's Larnach Castle on the longest night of the year (21 June).

He has had a number of television roles, including a role in the science fiction TV series The Boy From Andromeda (1991), produced by TVNZ's South Pacific Pictures and Atlantis Films Canada. He had a lead role as former Australian jockey and trainer Snow Rodgers in the children's TV series Moon Jumper (Television Two, 1987), and was also script editor for the series.
