= First Church of Otago =

19th-century Presbyterian church in Dunedin, New Zealand

Coordinates: 45.87602°S 170.50475°E

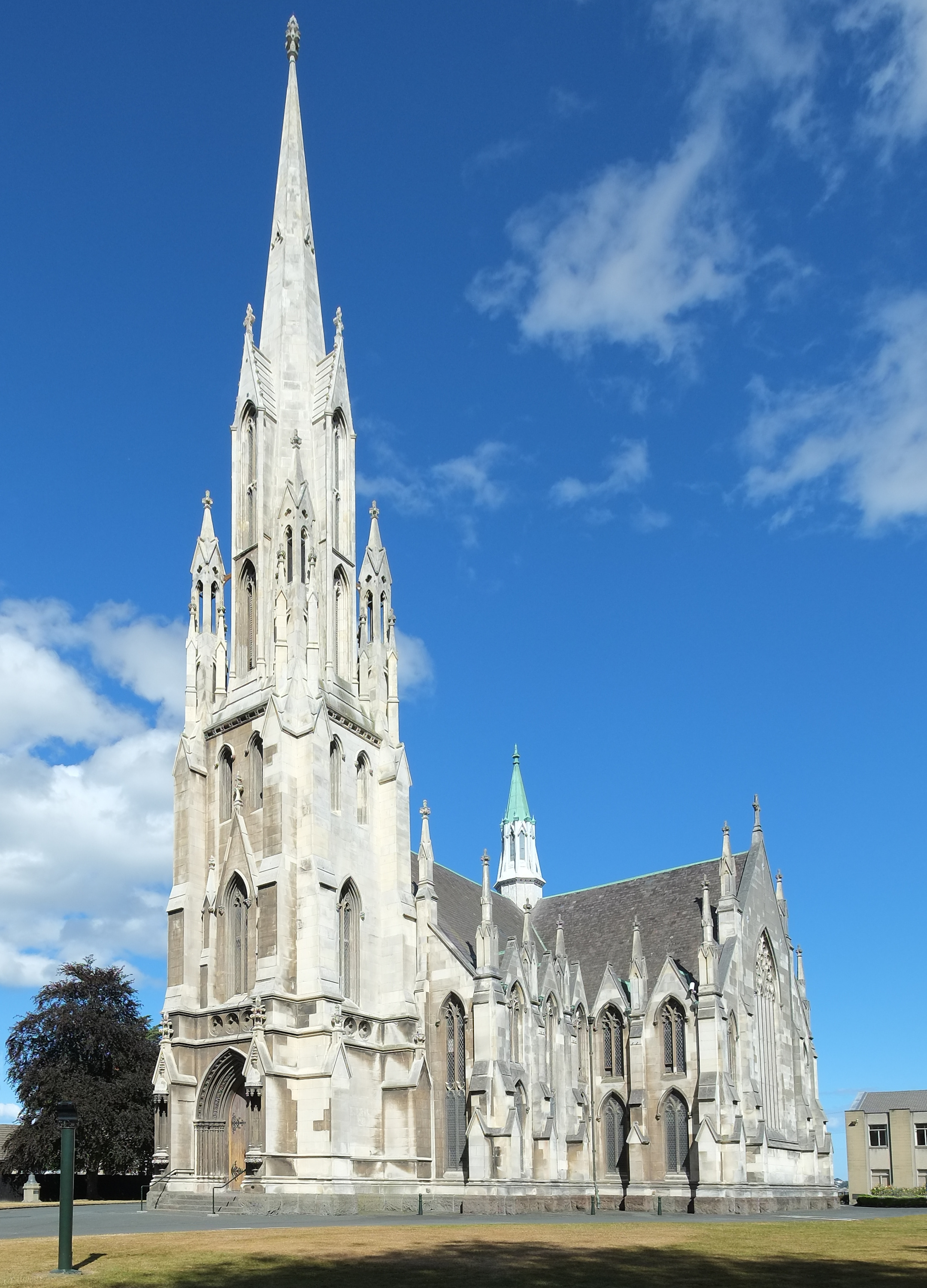
First Church, Dunedin

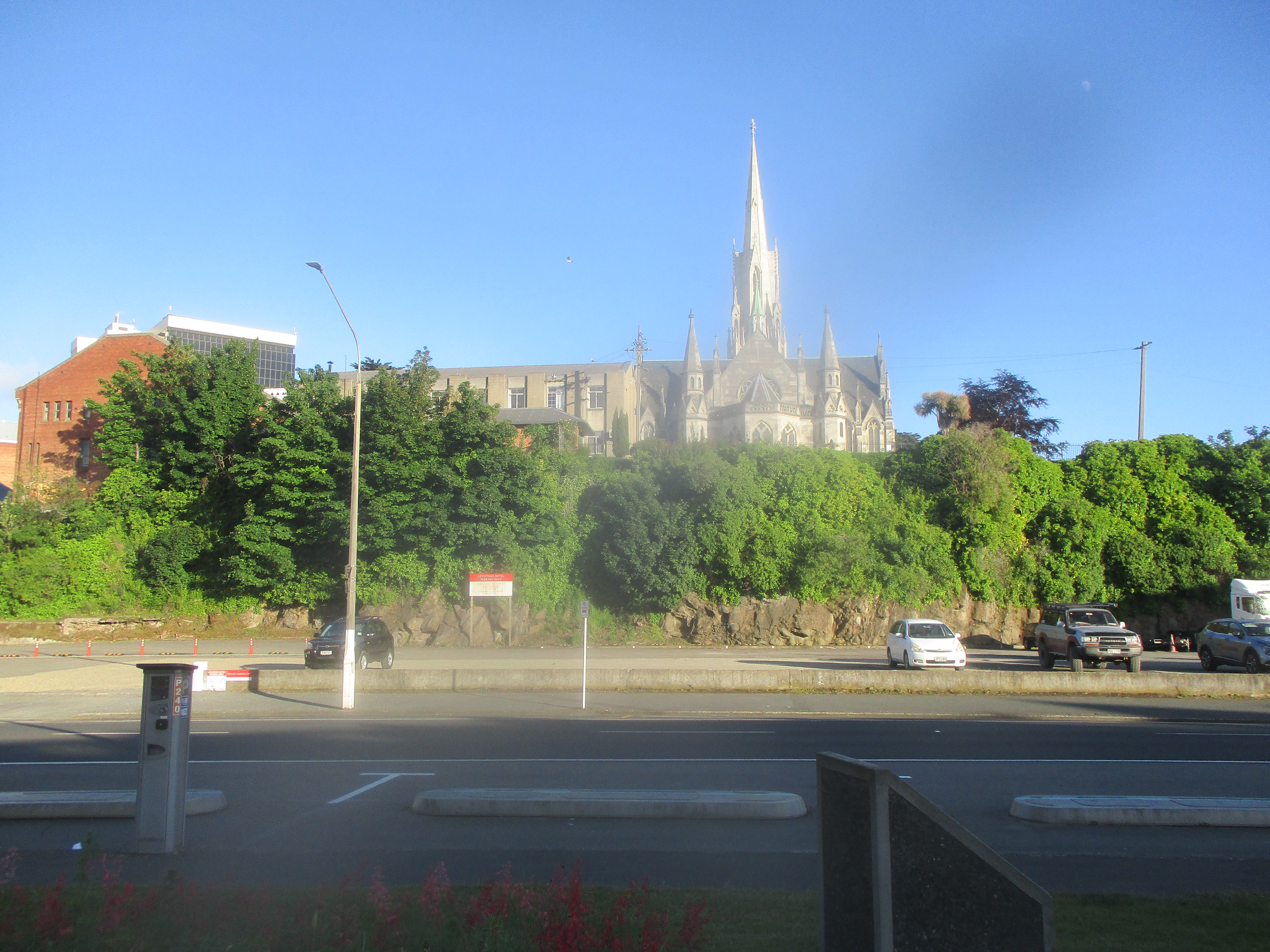

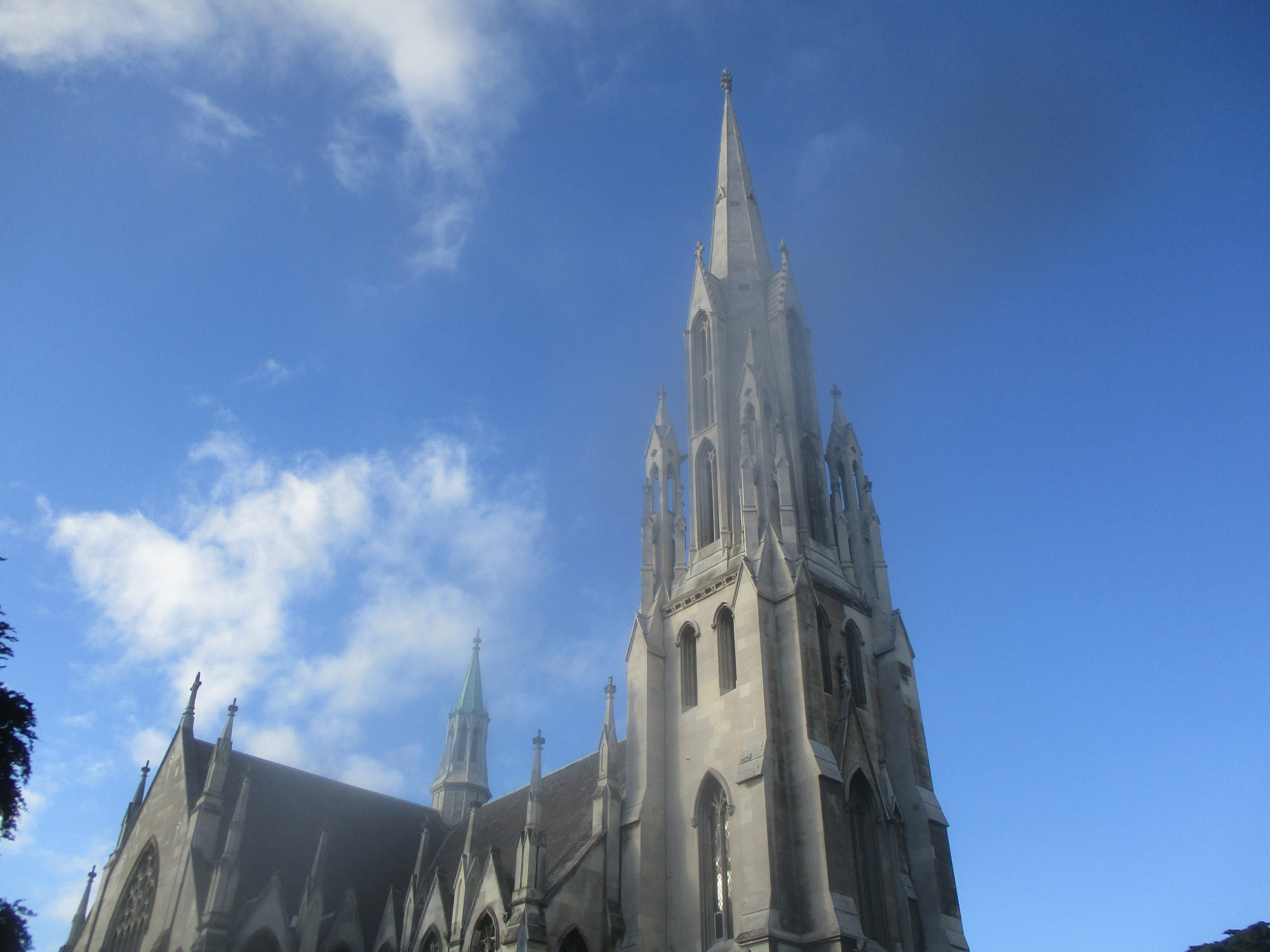

First Church is a prominent church in the New Zealand city of Dunedin. It is located in the heart of the city on Moray Place, 100 metres to the south of the city centre. The church is the city's primary Presbyterian church. The building is regarded as the most impressive of New Zealand's nineteenth-century churches, and is listed by Heritage New Zealand as a Category I structure.

== Earlier structures ==
Prior to the construction of the church, smaller earlier buildings had been used by the congregation, but the rapid rise in the city's population meant that a larger, more permanent structure was necessary.

The original First Church stood close to the former beach in the city's lower High Street. This was a rough, weatherboard building, erected very quickly, and capable of holding some 200 people. It was opened in September 1848, within six months of the arrival of the city's first permanent European settlers from Scotland. So hasty was the construction of the building that early congregations had to remain standing, as seating was not installed until three months later.

A stone church was built in 1850 which expanded and extended the original structure, doubling its capacity. This building not only served as a church, but, in the city's early days, was also a school, public lecture hall, and served as the Otago Provincial Council chambers. The building was utilitarian, and may have only ever been intended as a temporary solution, as plans for a more stately building were being mooted as early as 1856. After construction of the permanent church, the 1848 and 1850 buildings were used as a wool store, but were destroyed by fire in 1865.

From 1864 a third structure ("The Interim Church") was used, on a site above the previous buildings on Dowling Street. A sturdy wooden structure on a stone base, it had seating for 600, and was used until the present building was ready for use in 1873. The wooden building was dismantled and moved to Fryatt Street, where is served as a tram workshop; part of the original stone foundations on Dowling Street are still visible adjoining a city council car park.

== Construction ==
The current church stands on the stump of Bell Hill, a major promontory which initially divided the heart of Dunedin in two. In the city's early years, gold was discovered inland, resulting in rapid growth in the city. The hill became a massive obstacle to the development of Dunedin, and a decision was made by the Otago Provincial Council to make a substantial excavation into the hill. This resulted in a cutting through which one of the city's main streets, Princes Street, now passes, and the reduction of the height of Bell Hill by some 12 metres (40 ft). Much of the excavated soil and stone was used in the reclamation of land which now forms the Southern Endowment of South Dunedin. The church's site, on a promontory of what is left of the hill, commands views to the south across Queen's Gardens towards the Otago Harbour and South Dunedin.

The building, in decorated Gothic style, was designed in 1862 by Robert Lawson, who also designed the city's Knox Church, which has a similar tower. Lawson had won a competition for the design of the church from among six entrants. Construction was delayed after the decision to reduce Bell Hill, with the foundation stone being laid in May 1868 by Dr. Thomas Burns, and was officially opened on 23 November 1873, by which time Burns, its champion, had already died. The church is dominated by its multi-pinnacled tower crowned by a spire rising to 56.4 metres (185 ft). The spire is unusual as it is pierced by two-storeyed gabled windows on all sides, which give an illusion of even greater height. Such was Lawson's perfectionism that the top of the spire had to be dismantled and rebuilt when it failed to measure up to his standards. It can be seen from much of central Dunedin, and dominates the skyline of lower Moray Place, and has a capacity of over 1000.

The expense of the building was not without criticism. Some members of the Presbyterian synod felt the metropolitan church should not have been so privileged over the country districts where congregants had no purpose designed places of worship or only modest ones. The Reverend Dr Burns's championship of the project ensured it was carried through against such objections.

== The building ==
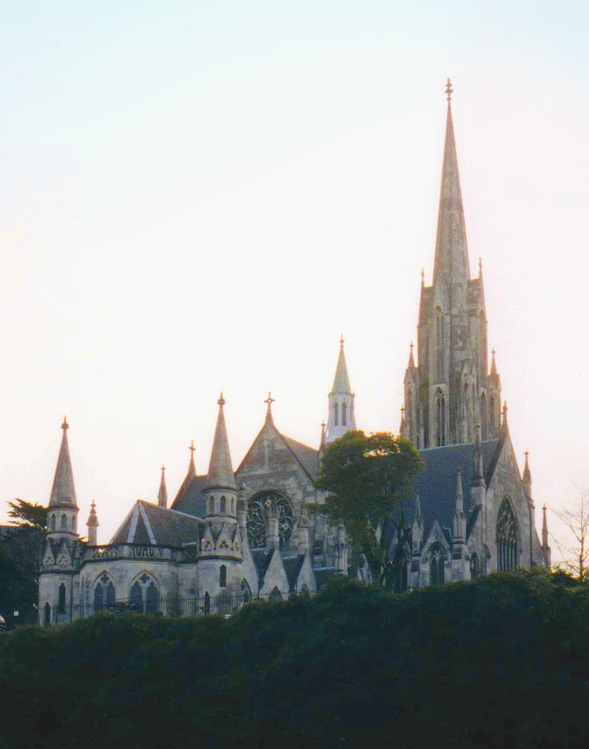
The rear of the building, as seen from Queens Gardens, shows the true architecture and extravagant European basilica-like quality of the church, which shocked its early congregation.

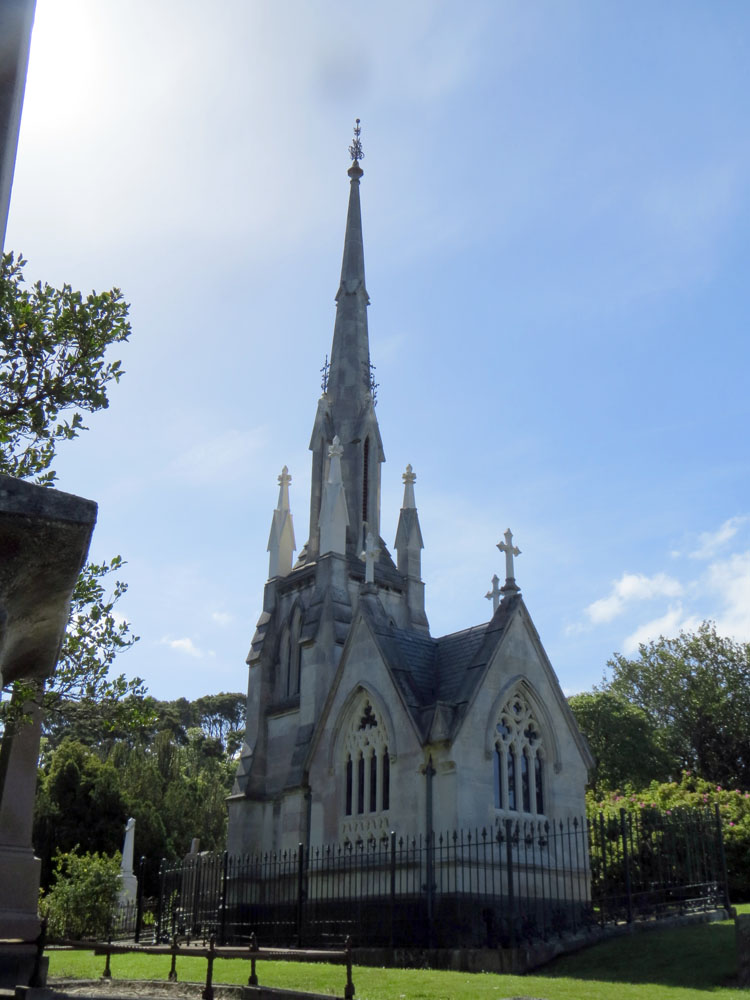
The mausoleum of William Larnach and family, in Dunedin Northern Cemetery, New Zealand, is a miniature replica of First Church.

Externally, First Church successfully replicates the effect, if on a smaller scale, of the late Norman cathedrals of England. The cathedral-like design and size can best be appreciated from the rear. There is an apse flanked by turrets, which are dwarfed by the massive gable containing the great rose window. It is this large circular window which after the spire becomes the focal point of the rear elevations. The whole architectural essay appears here almost European. Inside, instead of the stone vaulted ceiling of a Norman cathedral, there are hammer beams supporting a ceiling of pitched wood and a stone pointed arch acts as a simple proscenium to the central pulpit. Above this diffused light enters through a rose window of stained glass. This is flanked by further lights on the lower level, while twin organ pipes emphasise the symmetry of the pulpit.

At 56.4 metres (185 ft), the spire makes the building one of the tallest in the South Island, and it was the island's tallest building until the construction of ChristChurch Cathedral, Christchurch was completed in 1881. It again held that rank briefly from 1888, after the latter building was damaged by an earthquake. The church is currently the city's tallest building, and the fourth tallest building in the South Island (after Pacific Tower, the Forsyth Barr Building, and Rydge's Hotel, all in Christchurch).

The building is constructed of Oamaru stone, set on foundations of basalt breccia from Port Chalmers, with details carved by Louis Godfrey, who also did much of the woodcarving in the interior. The use of "cathedral glass", coloured but unfigured glass pending the donation of a pictorial window for the rose window is characteristic of Otago's 19th-century churches, where donors were relatively few reflecting the generally "low church" sentiments of the place. Similar examples can be found in several of Lawson's other churches throughout Otago.

Other notable features of the building include stained glass windows dedicated to those fallen in war and to the Otago Mounted Rifles. For many years, the church housed a 1908 Norman & Baird organ, though this was replaced in 1983 by a digital organ by Allen. A full set of eight change-ringing bells, cast by the Whitechapel Bell Foundry, was installed in 1975 and are rung by members of the Australian and New Zealand Association of Bellringers. At that time the only such set in a Presbyterian church outside the United Kingdom and claimed to be the southernmost ring of bells in the world. A large bell on a pedestal stands outside the church, sent from Scotland in 1851. Also located in the grounds in front of the church is a memorial plaque to Dr. Burns. The entrance gates to the church feature two lamps which started life as Edinburgh street lamps, another connection to the homeland of many of the city's first settlers.

A miniature of the church was created by Lawson in the city's Northern Cemetery as a family tomb for noted early Dunedinite William Larnach.

Regular Sunday services are held in the church in English (10.00am), Cook Island Maori (12.00 Noon), and Samoan (2.00pm). The church is also used for a variety of both religious and secular civic and cultural events within the city.
