= Carolyn Taylor (broadcaster) =

New Zealand television personality and presenter

- Born: 16 August 1980 (age 46); Auckland, New Zealand
- Occupations: Television presenter, actress
- Years active: 1998–present
- Spouse: Wes Keep
- Children: 1

Carolyn Keep (née Taylor; born 16 August 1980) is a New Zealand television personality and presenter. Taylor is known as one of the prominent faces for New Zealand Children's television in the late 1990s, as one of the hosts for What Now. Taylor began her broadcast career the young age of 18 years old, before television, Taylor had studied in Wellington at the Victoria University of Wellington.

Taylors’ other ventures included the short-lived series, Ghost Hunt, that aired on TV2 in 2005. Taylor also appeared on the 2007 television reality show Treasure Island, and Dancing with the Stars as a contestant in 2019.

== Early life ==
Taylor was born in Auckland. She grew up in Hokitika and then moved with her family to Upper Hutt, Wellington. Taylor attended Hokitika Primary School and Upper Hutt College.

== Career ==
Taylor first started as a presenter in the late 1990s for the New Zealand children's television show What Now, beginning her job as a presenter at the age of 18. Before this Taylor was studying law and commerce at Victoria University of Wellington. Taylor has also appeared on various other television shows since the 1990s including Ghost Hunt, Treasure Island and Dancing with the Stars.

== Personal life ==
Taylor is married to Wes Keep, and the couple have one son, Jasper. She is an ambassador for Cure Kids New Zealand and for Chemist Warehouse.

== Filmography ==
=== Television ===
- What Now (1998-2004)
- Dark Knight
- WNTV (2001 & 2008)
- Ghost Hunt (2005)
- What Now? 25th Birthday Celebration
- Treasure Island (2007)
- People on Bikes (2018)
- Dancing with the Stars (2019)
- Uncharted New Zealand (2021)
