= Former Trinity Methodist Church, Dunedin =

Former church and theatre in Dunedin, New Zealand

Trinity Methodist Church (former)
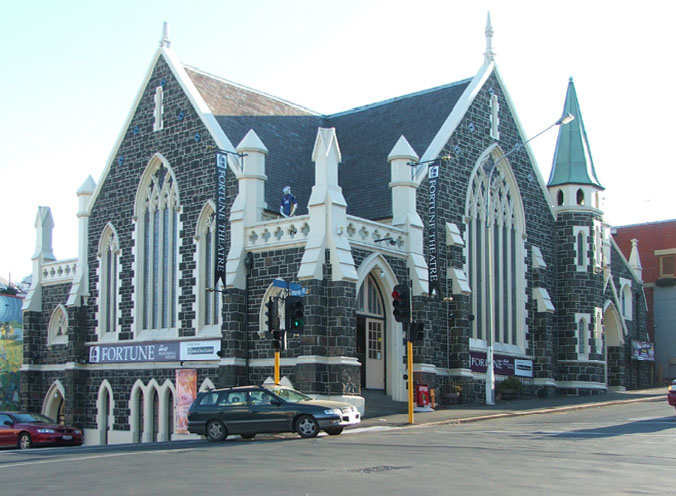
- The former church in 2006
- Trinity Methodist Church (former)
- 45°52′25″S 170°30′05″E
- Address: 231 Stuart Street, Dunedin
- Country: New Zealand
- Previous denomination: Methodist

History
- Status: Church (1870 – 1977); Fortune Theatre company (1978 – 2018)

Architecture
- Functional status: Unused
- Architect: R. A. Lawson
- Architectural type: Church
- Style: Gothic Revival
- Closed: 25 December 1977 (church); 1 May 2018 (theatre)

Specifications
- Capacity: 227 (Mainstage); 104 (Studio)
- Materials: Trachyandesite; Oamaru stone

Heritage New Zealand – Category 1
- Official name: Trinity Methodist Church (Former)
- Designated: 22 August 1991
- Reference no.: 3378

The former Trinity Methodist Church is registered as a category I historic place by Heritage New Zealand, which recognises its historic and architectural significance. Originally a Methodist church, it is located on the corner of Moray Place and Upper Stuart Street, in the heart of the southern city of Dunedin. In 1977 the church was refitted and operated as the Fortune Theatre.

Financial difficulties in 2000 threatened the theatre with closure, and forced the sale of the building to the Dunedin City Council, who leased the building back to the Fortune Theatre Trust. The theatre trust closed in 2018. As of July 2021, the building is empty with no current plans for its use.

== Background ==
The Methodist congregation of Dunedin initially met at the Oddfellows Hall and then at the City Council Chambers, previously the Dunedin Athenaeum and Mechanics' Institute, on the corner of Manse and High Streets. The congregation were gifted a plot of land on Bell Hill. A wooden building with a slate roof, designed by W Greenfield, was erected but during construction strong winds damaged the building, which was on an exposed site near the present-day Dowling Street. The structure was required to be fortified with buttresses and a transept, which more than doubled the original tender price of £1100. The finished building was reportedly draughty, uncomfortable and the lights swayed in strong winds. Eventually the church was considered unsafe, and services moved to the Lyceum.

When the first minister for Dunedin was appointed, Isaac Harding (1815–1897), services were held in a canvas tent on Stafford Street. Mr Harding was succeeded by Mr Aldred in 1864, and then by Reverend A R Fitchett. The Otago gold rush swelled congregation numbers, and plans were made for a new church on Stuart Street.

== Existing church building ==
The Trinity Methodist Church was designed by Scotsman R. A. Lawson and was opened in 1870. Made out of the local materials trachyandesite and Oamaru stone, the former church is an example of Gothic Revival architecture and contains a "Rose" stained glass window which is located at the back of what was later the theatre's main stage. The building is close to the city's centre, The Octagon.

The congregation proposed building a nearby Sunday School in 1924, as a memorial to those who had died in the First World War. Instead, a Sunday School was established in the basement of the church, opening on 28 June 1930.

The church closed in 1977, with the final service on Christmas Day of that year.

== Theatre ==
In 1966 the building was structurally strengthened and waterproofed, the Mission organ was enlarged. Other changes included renovation of the interior, reduction of the exterior pinnacles and recladding of the bell tower. In 1977 it was remodelled for use as a theatre.

The Fortune Theatre company was initially located in the 105-seat Otago Cine Club theatrette at the rear of the Athenaeum building of the Octagon. However, after hiring full-time acting staff in 1977, it was decided that the venue was too small to continue to be viable and in 1978 the company moved to the former Trinity Methodist Church where it remained until its closure in 2018. Financial difficulties in 2000 threatened the theatre with closure, and forced the sale of the building to the Dunedin City Council, who leased the building back to the Fortune Theatre Trust.

=== Ghost hunt ===
Not long after the Fortune Theatre moved into the old church, tales spread of "sinister voices" being heard offstage and well-secured lights falling from the lighting grid. A phantom audience member has also been reported by theatregoers on numerous occasions. Reports continued to come from a variety of reliable sources until the claimed hauntings of the Fortune Theatre became a part of Dunedin folklore.

In 2005, the theatre was featured on Ghost Hunt, a New Zealand television show, as it is claimed that the theatre is haunted. The Ghost Hunt investigation team visited the theatre and were shown a picture that is claimed to show the ghost of a young woman gliding through a wall of the foyer, below a Gothic window. During the investigation team's visit, they were also able to talk to people who had worked at the theatre and claim to have had paranormal experiences in the building:

A lighting technician claimed that he was all alone setting up on stage one day when he "glimpsed a person" over his shoulder on the edge of the stage and thought that "they were reading through some lines, as an actor would" but knew no cast members were around at the time. He turned the stage lights on and "suddenly they were gone".

A man who ran the box office claimed to have had two "disconcerting" experiences. The first experience involved a "young boy sitting in the corner". He initially "thought nothing of it" but the "realisation struck" him that the theatre was closed. He "turned back around, but he'd disappeared." The second experience involved a girl he claims he noticed when he "looked up to the back corner of the audience seating, near where the soundman usually sits" after he heard "a strange noise in the theatre" on one occasion.

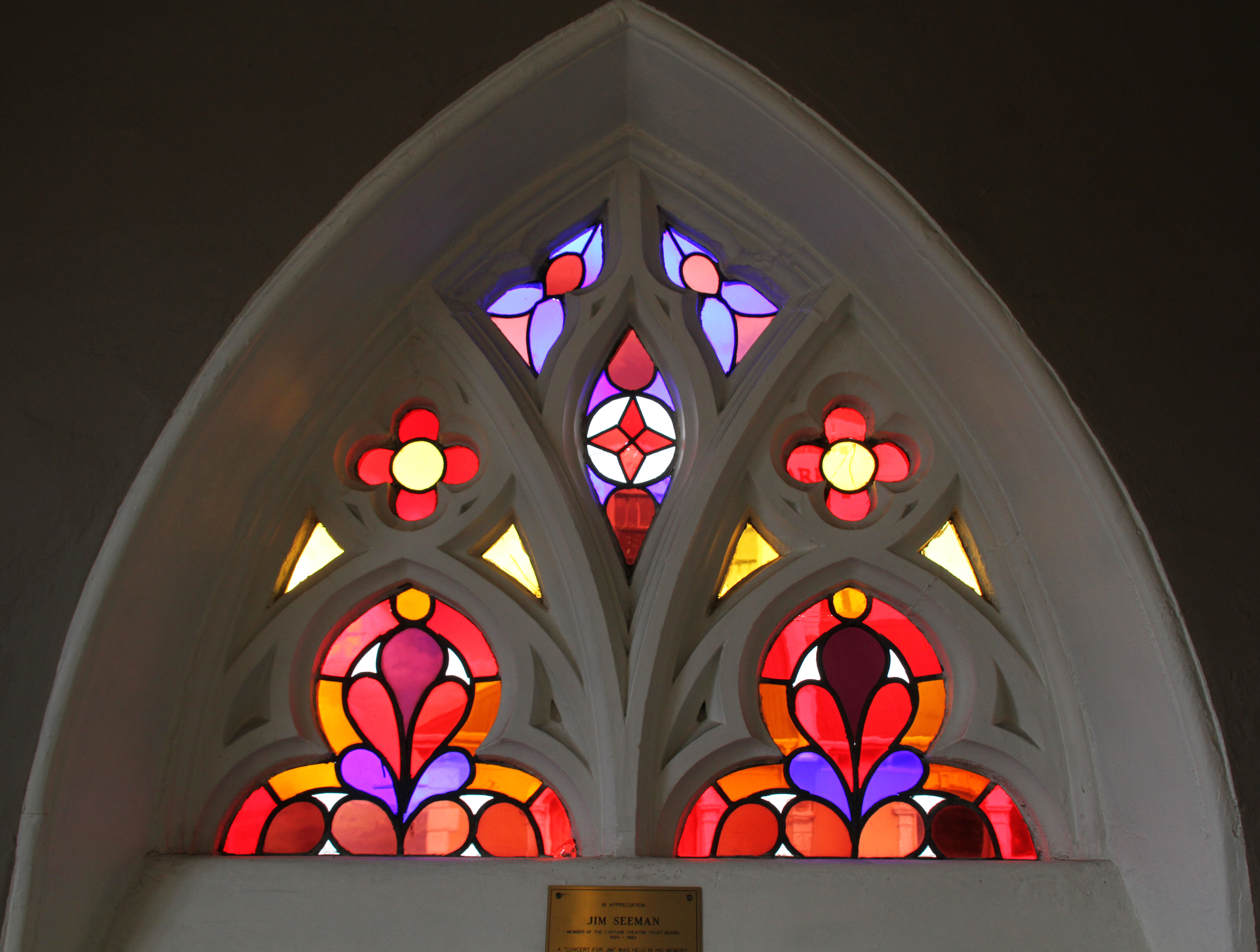
Fortune Theatre Window.

== See also ==
- List of historic places in Dunedin
