= Shona Dunlop MacTavish =

New Zealand dancer and choreographer (1920–2019)

Shona Dunlop MacTavish MBE
- Born: Shona Katrine Dunlop; 12 April 1920; Dunedin, New Zealand
- Died: 18 June 2019 (aged 99); Dunedin, New Zealand
- Known for: Dancer, choreographer
- Spouse: MacDonald MacTavish (m. 1948; died 1957)
- Children: 3
- Relatives: Terry MacTavish (daughter); Bonar Dunlop (brother); Jocelyn Ryburn (sister); Hubert Ryburn (brother-in-law); John Dunlop (uncle)
- Website: shonadunlopmactavish.com

Shona Katrine MacTavish MBE (née Dunlop; 12 April 1920 – 18 June 2019) was a New Zealand dancer, teacher, author, choreographer and pioneer in liturgical dance in the Asia-Pacific. She was known as "the mother of modern dance in New Zealand".

== Early life and dance career ==
Shona Katrine Dunlop was born in Dunedin on 12 April 1920; her father was Francis Dunlop, a Scottish-born Presbyterian minister who lectured in moral philosophy at the University of Otago, and her brother was Bonar Dunlop who became a noted sculptor.

In 1935, she and her family travelled to Europe, and she enrolled to study with expressionist dancer and choreographer Gertrud Bodenwieser at the University of Music and Performing Arts, Vienna. She studied there for two years and then joined as a principal dancer. Bodenwieser and many of her dancers were Jewish and in 1938, when the Nazis invaded Austria, the ballet was forced to leave Europe. The company toured South America then based themselves in Sydney, Australia, and toured New Zealand during the late 1940s. Dunlop continued to dance with the Bodenwieser Ballet and also taught ballet in local Sydney schools, including Abottsleigh Girls' School.

== Marriage and missionary work ==
In 1948, Dunlop met Scottish Free Church minister MacDonald MacTavish in Sydney, and married him less than three weeks later at St Stephen's Presbyterian Church in central Sydney. MacTavish, a Canadian and cousin of Canadian prime minister Mackenzie King, was on his way to China to take up a position as a missionary in Yichang and Dunlop resigned her position as a dancer to go with him. The couple left Sydney in July 1948 for Beijing where they spent three months learning Mandarin and waiting for government permission to move to Manchuria. While they were in Beijing, fighting broke out between Communist and Nationalist forces and the MacTavishs evacuated to Taiwan. They were invited to work at the English Presbyterian Church Mission in Tainan; Dunlop MacTavish taught not only English, but also ballet for the local children. In 1957, her husband died while they were serving as missionaries in South Africa and she returned to Dunedin as a solo mother with three young children.

== Later dance career ==
Initially, Dunlop MacTavish taught dance at Dunedin's Columba College and in 1958, she opened her own studio – New Zealand's first modern dance studio. By 1963, she had set up a performing group, Dunedin Dance Theatre.

Dunlop MacTavish's fascination with the diverse range of dance forms she had observed while living and touring abroad, combined with her own strong Christian faith, led her to explore the practice of liturgical dance - the use of dance as an expression of religious belief. During the 1960s and 1970s, she developed and delivered workshops and lectures on liturgical dance throughout the Asia-Pacific region, such as the East Asian Christian Council of Youth Conference, the Federation of Theological Colleges of South East Asia and the World Council of Churches. For many of these projects she choreographed ballet and dance performances for and with the participants and congregations.

In the 1970s, Dunlop MacTavish moved to the Philippines and took a position as professor of dance at Silliman University. While there, she conducted research into the dance traditions of the indigenous people of the Philippines. She observed and documented dances performed to mark courtship and marriage, and to celebrate harvests and births and hypothesised that all indigenous dance stems from religious beliefs.

Dunlop MacTavish also worked as a choreographer in New Zealand. Her first work for the Royal New Zealand Ballet was a reconstruction of her Pania of the Reef in 1970. For this production, she sourced a Māori vocalist and borrowed traditional clothing from a museum. In 1998 she choreographed the opera Outrageous Fortune.

== Honours and awards ==
In the 1985 New Year Honours, Dunlop MacTavish was appointed a Member of the Order of the British Empire, for services to the arts. In 2001, she was awarded an honorary Doctor of Literature degree by the University of Otago. In 2017, she was made an honorary member of Dance Aotearoa New Zealand.

== Later life, death, and legacy ==
Dunlop MacTavish suffered serious injury in a crash in 2012, but continued to teach dance after her recovery. She died in Dunedin on 18 June 2019 at the age of 99, and her funeral at Knox Church, Dunedin included dancers escorting her casket and improvised dance by members of the congregation. She was survived by her long-time artistic collaborator and friend, Louise, and her three children.

Dunlop MacTavish's son, Dugald MacTavish, a geohydrologist, was awarded the Queen's Service Medal, for services to conservation and the environment, in the 2019 Queen's Birthday Honours. Her daughter, Terry MacTavish, was appointed a Member of the New Zealand Order of Merit, for services to theatre and education, in the 2019 New Year Honours. Dunlop MacTavish's granddaughter, Jinty MacTavish, was elected to the Dunedin City Council in 2010 as a 25-year-old, the second-youngest person ever elected as a Dunedin councillor.

In October 2025, an exhibition based on Dunlop MacTavish's life and career opened at Toitū Otago Settlers Museum in Dunedin. The exhibition features costumes and memorabilia, as well as a ballet barre for visitors to try, and is due to run for two years.

== Publications ==
- Dunlop MacTavish, Shona: An Ecstasy of Purpose. The Life and Art of Gertrud Bodenwieser. Dunedin, 1987.
- Dunlop MacTavish, Shona: Gertrud Bodenwieser. Tänzerin, Choreographin, Pädagogin. Wien – Sydney. (Gekürzte Ausgabe, aus dem Englischen übersetzt von Gabriele Haefs, hrsg.v. Denny Hirschbach). Zeichen und Spuren, Bremen 1992. ISBN 3-924588-21-X.
- Dunlop MacTavish, Shona Leap of faith: my dance through life. Longacre Press, Dunedin, 1997.
