= Dunedin Synagogue =

Synagogue in Dunedin, New Zealand

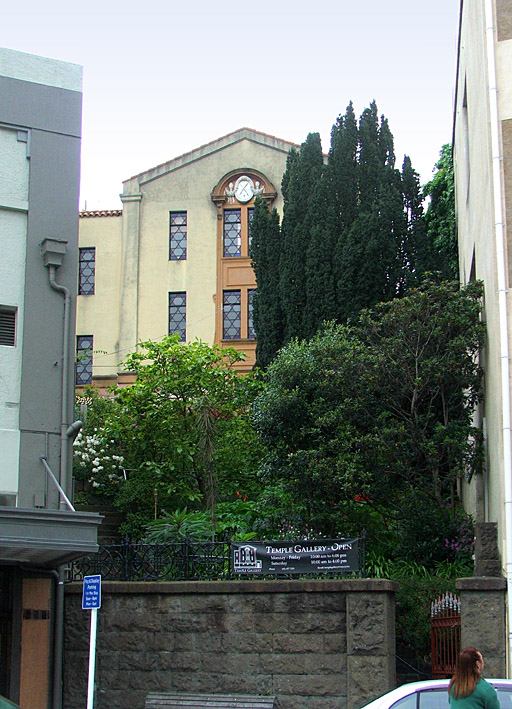
- The former 1863 synagogue building, in Moray Place

- Location of the synagogue on the South Island

Religion
- Affiliation: Reform Judaism
- Ecclesiastical or organizational status: Synagogue
- Status: Active

Location
- Location: North Dunedin, South Island
- Country: New Zealand
- Interactive map of Dunedin Synagogue
- Administration: Dunedin Jewish Congregation
- Coordinates: 45°51′37.44″S 170°30′41.57″E

Architecture
- Architects: W. H. Sumner (1863); Louis Boldini (1881); John Goldwater (1965)
- Type: Synagogue architecture
- Established: 1862 (as a congregation)
- Completed: 1863 (Moray Place #1); 1881 (Moray Place #2); 1965 (North Dunedin)

The Dunedin Synagogue is a Progressive Jewish congregation and synagogue, located in North Dunedin, on the South Island of New Zealand. It is reputedly the world's southernmost permanent synagogue, although a further synagogue operated briefly in King Edward Street, South Dunedin from late 2017 until 2019.

The congregation's first synagogue was completed in 1863, enlarged at an adjacent location in 1881, and relocated to a more modest suburban structure, completed in 1965. The term, Dunedin Synagogue, can refer to the historic 1863 building, the old Dunedin 1881 synagogue, the current 1965 synagogue, and to the Dunedin Jewish Congregation.

== History ==
=== Moray Place, first synagogue ===
Dunedin's first Jewish congregation assembled in January 1862 in the home of H.E. Nathan in George Street. With 43 members, it was clear that a more permanent base was needed, and a site in Moray Place. A synagogue, designed by W. H. Sumner, was built and opened in September 1863. This building was used until 1881, by which time it was proving too small for the growing congregation. The building was sold to the Freemasons, who occupied it until 1992 as a Masonic Lodge. Since that time it has been a private residence, and was an art gallery (the Temple Gallery) during the 2000s, before reverting to being a private residence. This structure is the southernmost permanent site, past or present, of a synagogue in the world.

=== Moray Place, second synagogue ===
Plans to move to a larger synagogue were being made by 1875. By this time the congregation had grown to the point that the new synagogue was to be one of the largest in the southern hemisphere, and one of the largest places of worship of any denomination in Dunedin. The new building, opened in 1881, was built almost directly across Moray Place from the first synagogue, and was designed by Louis Boldini with a facade ornamented by a series of Doric columns. The building was capable of holding a congregation of 600 people. This building served as the city's synagogue until 1965, when the now dwindled congregation moved to a new, smaller building in George Street. The Boldini synagogue was sold to the Y.M.C.A. and was demolished shortly afterwards to make way for that organisation's new building. The site of this structure is now that of a multi-storey car park building.

=== Dunedin North, third synagogue ===
The current and third synagogue was erected in 1965 in Dunedin North, not far from the University of Otago. A more modest building than its predecessors, the building is compact and is constructed of concrete block. It was designed by John Goldwater, a Jewish New Zealand architect who also more famously designed the Auckland Jewish community centre. As with its predecessors, it lays claim to being the world's southernmost permanent synagogue.

== Congregation ==
The Dunedin Jewish Congregation is a Progressive Jewish community and a member of the Union for Progressive Judaism (UPJ), the regional division of the World Union for Progressive Judaism. Services are held approximately one Friday a month along with most holidays.
