= Southern Comedy Players =

New Zealand theatre company

The Southern Comedy Players, later the Southern Players and the Southern Theatre Trust, were a New Zealand theatre company, active between 1957 and 1971. They were founded by William Menlove and Bernard Esquilant, and based in Dunedin.

The company initially toured throughout the South Island, and then occasionally nationally. Menlove and Esquilant's intention in forming the company had been to focus on the South Island towns that were too small to merit a visit by the New Zealand Players.

The initial repertoire was mainly popular contemporary West End comedy and musicals. After the success of the first two shows, Charley's Aunt and Noel Coward's Private Lives, the company toured nationally with the musical Salad Days. They played 134 performance in 78 towns to approximately 70,000 people, which equalled the achievements of the New Zealand Players with the same show in 1956.

In 1962 the company converted the former Foresters' Lodge hall on Albany Street in Dunedin into the 100-seat Playhouse Theatre. The intention was to use the Playhouse as a venue for plays of less mass appeal than those which were played in lyric theatres and town halls on its major tours. At this point the Southern Comedy Players were the only surviving professional theatre company in New Zealand. The Playhouse was later reconfigured and its seating capacity increased to 170.

In 1963 the company presented Bruce Mason's The Pohutukawa Tree, directed by the playwright. As a result of this production Mason made some changes to the script which were incorporated in the second published edition. Some early Southern Comedy Players productions were produced for them by Patric Carey of the Globe Theatre, Dunedin.

By 1965 there had been four national tours - Salad Days (1959), Free As Air (1960), Watch it Sailor (1961) and Johnny Belinda (1962), nine South Island tours - Charley's Aunt (1957), Private Lives (1958), Sailor Beware (1958), Doctor in the House (1958), While the Sun Shines (1959), The Cat and the Canary (1959), Blithe Spirit (1959), Love in a Mist (1962), House on the Cliff (1964), three productions at the Playhouse (The Pohutukawa Tree, The Shifting Heart (1963) and The Living Room (1964)) and a revival of Salad Days staged at His Majesty's Theatre, Dunedin, in 1963. With the exception of 1959, there were Drama Trios playing to schools' audiences. A full production of Beauty and the Beast was also toured nationally to schools' audiences.

In 1966, the company changed its name to Southern Players, as a response to the Queen Elizabeth II Arts Council desire to see a broader repertoire and permanent repertory companies in New Zealand's major cities. After this, the company included more classics and drama in their offerings, as well as supporting a Quartet which toured schools nationally. The Southern Players' productions were Portrait of A Queen, The Public Eye / The Private Ear, Rattle of a Simple Man, The Knack, The Creeper, Johnny So Long, The Boyfriend, The Importance of Being Earnest, Hedda Gabler and Pygmalion. The Arts Council subsequently also encouraged the formation of the Southern Theatre Trust, which acquired the assets of the privately owned Southern Players company in 1969. Waric Slyfield was selected by the trustees as the Artistic Director, and although Menlove and Esquilant had positions as stage manager and business manager respectively, they left the organisation within a matter of months. In Slyfield's time the major productions were See How They Run, A Streetcar Named Desire, King Lear, A Resounding Tinkle / Black Comedy, Say Who You Are, There's a Girl in my Soup and The Anniversary plus two popular Music Halls. After Warwick Slyfield left in mid-1970, the English actor David Phethean was appointed as Artistic Director. During his time with the Trust he directed Relatively Speaking, The Thwarting of Baron Bolligrew, Macbeth and What the Butler Saw. The final Artistic Director, Alistair Douglas, directed one production, Luv, in late 1970. After the Trust was wound up, Douglas led an amateur group, The Playhouse Theatre Club, which in 1971 staged late night revues, Winnie the Pooh and Rosencrantz and Guildenstern Are Dead, before the Playhouse Theatre was sold to the Dunedin Repertory Society.

== Notable people ==
- Actor Terry MacTavish's first professional engagement was touring with The Southern Comedy Players as Gwendolen in The Importance of Being Earnest.
- John Hunter, a long serving member of the Kiwi Revue Company who also acted with the New Zealand Players, starred in the Players' second production, Private Lives.
- New Zealand actors with English training and / or experience who worked with the Southern Comedy Players included Averil (Rilla) Stephens, Jonathon (Jon) Elsom, Sybil Westland, Jonathon (John) Hardy, John Kim and Bryan Aitken.
- New Zealand actors who worked with the Southern Comedy Players / Southern Theatre Trust early in their careers include Simon O'Connor, Peter Tulloch, David Weatherly and Shirley Kelly.
- Australian actors who worked with the Southern Comedy Players / Southern Theatre Trust included Myrtle Woods, John Elveved, Colin Lehmann, Bruce Kerr, Fran Kelly and Dalvern Thom.
- Grahame Clifford, who had a career in English theatre, settled in Dunedin following a J. C. Williamsons' Gilbert and Sullivan tour in 1957. He directed Sailor Beware, Doctor in the House, While the Sun Shines, Salad Days and The Cat and the Canary for the Southern Comedy Players. Frank Newman, who had also trained and worked in England, directed Johnny Belinda for the Southern Comedy Players at the conclusion of a seven year stint as professional producer for the Canterbury Repertory Theatre in Christchurch.

== See also ==
- New Zealand Players
