= Fortune Theatre, Dunedin =

Former theatre company in Dunedin, New Zealand

Fortune Theatre
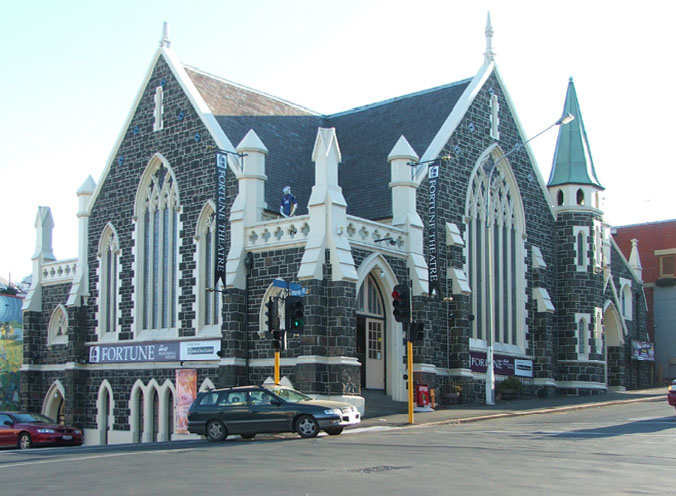
- The Fortune Theatre in 2006
- Formation: 1973
- Dissolved: 1 May 2018
- Type: Theatre group
- Location: Dunedin, New Zealand

New Zealand's Fortune Theatre laid claim to being the world's southernmost professional theatre company and sole year round professional theatre group in Dunedin, until its closure on 1 May 2018, citing financial difficulties. The company ran for 44 years. The theatre regularly produced local shows and hosted touring performances.

The company was originally located in the auditorium of the Dunedin Athenaeum and Mechanics' Institute in the Octagon, but when that proved too small, moved to the former Trinity Methodist Church on Stuart Street.

Financial difficulties in 2000 threatened the theatre with closure, and forced the sale of the building to the Dunedin City Council, who leased the building back to the Fortune Theatre Trust.

== Early years ==
The Fortune Theatre company was co-founded by David Carnegie, Alex Gilchrist, Murray Hutchinson and Huntly Elliot in 1973. The company was initially located in the 105-seat Otago Cine Club theatrette at the rear of the Athenaeum building in the Octagon. However, after hiring full-time acting staff in 1977, it was decided that the venue was too small to continue to be viable and in 1978 the company moved to the former Trinity Methodist Church where it remained until its closure in 2018. This provided room for two auditoria, Upstairs initially seating 230, and the Downstairs Studio opened in 1979 initially seating 120. Following a fire in late 1979 the Company moved for two months to the Playhouse (originally the home of the Fortune's predecessors as a Dunedin-based professional repertory theatre company, the Southern [Comedy] Players / Southern Theatre Trust). For some years in the 1990s the Company also leased the Manhattan night club as an occasional third performance space and from time to time it also presented productions at the Regent and Mayfair Theatres, Allen Hall Theatre on the University of Otago campus, and the Dunedin College of Education's auditorium. From 1976 onwards it aimed to make an annual tour of Otago and Southland regional centres and in the late 1970s and also mid-1980s made schools' tours in those regions.

== Productions ==
=== Most popular productions 1974–2004 ===
Year	Play	Author	Seats sold
1987	The Share Club	Roger Hall	6,491
1992	Ladies Night	Stephen Sinclair / Anthony McCarten	5,825
1986	Love Off the Shelf	Roger Hall / A. K. Grant / Philip Norman	5,612
1995	Social Climbers	Roger Hall	5,604
1990	Conjugal Rites	Roger Hall	5,400
1994	Ladies Night II	Stephen Sinclair / Anthony McCarten	5,101
1990	The Sex Fiend	Danny Mulheron / Stephen Sinclair	5,020
1988	After the Crash	Roger Hall	4,884
1994	By Degrees	Roger Hall	4,839
1996	Market Forces	Roger Hall	4,522
1981	Foreskin's Lament	Greg McGee	4,424
1994	Larnach	Michelanne Foster	4,360
2000	Take a Chance on Me	Roger Hall	4,254
1983	Hot Water	Roger Hall	4,204
1997	Charley's Aunt	Brandon Thomas	4,177
1980	Prisoners of Mother England	Roger Hall	4,120
1977	Glide Time	Roger Hall	4,000

=== Productions by year ===
In 2006 Geraldine Brophy, who had acted at the Fortune in Tony Taylor's 1984 company, directed the world premiere of her play The Paradise Package.

The 2007 Fortune season included a co-production with the Wellington-based company, the Bacchanals, of Shakespeare's King Lear. The production was to have featured famous English actor Edward Petherbridge in the title role but he became ill shortly after arriving in New Zealand for rehearsals and had to withdraw. The title role was then taken at short notice by Mick Rose. The 2007 season also saw the New Zealand premiere of Sarah Ruhl's The Clean House.

In 2009 the Fortune staged its most successful ever single season of a play. This was Roger Hall's hit, Four Flat Whites in Italy, which was seen by 6,606 spectators in its month-long season (around 7% of Dunedin's permanent resident population).

The 2010 season included the New Zealand premiere of Marc Camoletti's farce, Ding Dong. The Fortune also staged a revival of Camoletti's best-known piece, Boeing Boeing, in 2013.

The Motor Camp by Dave Armstrong (opened February 18), Red by John Logan (opened April 14), Two Fish 'n' a Scoop by Carl Nixon (opened May 19), In The Next Room – Or the Vibrator Play by Sarah Ruhl (opened June), Heroes by Gerald Sibleyras (opened August 25), Calendar Girls by Tim Firth (opened November 10) made up the 2012 season. The Fortune's contribution to the 2012 Otago Festival of the Arts was a production of Samuel Beckett's Play.

The 2013 season commenced with a co-production between the Fortune and Wellington's Taki Rua Theatre of Michael James Manaia by local playwright John Broughton. It continued with off-Broadway success Love, Loss and What I Wore, the hit Roger Hall musical about grandparenting (You Can Always Hand Them Back), Nina Raine's Tribes, the long-running off-Broadway musical Altar Boyz in its New Zealand premiere, and the World Premiere of Patrick Evans's Gifted which toured to four arts festivals, several Otago / Southland regional centres and was revived at Wellington's Circa Theatre in 2015.

The Fortune presented Harold Pinter's The Caretaker as its contribution to the 2014 Otago Festival of the Arts. To celebrate the Company's 40th anniversary it staged the New Zealand premiere of Jumpy by April de Angelis.

The 2016 season included Niu Sila by Oscar Kightley and Dave Armstrong. This production also toured to seven regional centres. There was also a co-production with the Court Theatre in Christchurch of Paul Baker's play Winston's Birthday. As its entry in that year's Otago Festival of the Arts the Fortune staged Samuel Beckett's Krapp's Last Tape.

2017: Twelfth Night and Into the Woods

The 2018 season commenced with Jeeves and Wooster in Perfect Nonsense. The final mainbill production staged at the Fortune was An Iliad in April 2018. The production starred Auckland actor Michael Hurst with music by Shayne Carter.

== Legacy and significant moments ==
Over its 44 years the Fortune Theatre staged 407 main stage productions, and sold over 750,000 tickets. On its closure in 2018 commentator Kate Prior said: "Fortune Theatre has been an essential engine of new writing in New Zealand, a launch pad for some of our best actors, and an Otago and Southland theatre home."

The Fortune Theatre's costumes was purchased from the liquidators after they closed and are being looked after by the Stage South Charitable Trust.

By 2004 the Company had presented 42 World Premieres (including nine plays written for children). Seventeen of these had received subsequent productions at other New Zealand professional theatres and five at international venues. The best known of these are Mothers and Fathers (Joe Musaphia), Cinderella (Roger Hall), Love Off the Shelf (Roger Hall, A. K. Grant, Philip Norman), The Share Club (Roger Hall), After the Crash (Roger Hall), Jeannie Once (Renee), Making it Big (Roger Hall, Philip Norman), Anzac (John Broughton), By Degrees (Roger Hall), 1981 (John Broughton), Social Climbers (Roger Hall), C'Mon Black (Roger Hall), Dirty Weekends (Roger Hall, Philip Norman), The Book Club (Roger Hall) and Home Land (Gary Henderson). Brian McNeill was the Company's Writer in Residence from 1980 to 1982 (writing Smelter Skelter, What an Exhibition and The Perfumed Business Woman in that time) and Robert Lord in 1991. The latter was commissioned to write Academic Circles but his premature death meant that the script was never completed.

The Fortune in its lifetime staged more of Roger Hall's plays (36) than any other theatre.

A number of Fortune productions were toured to or staged at other professional theatres in New Zealand. These include Kaz: A Working Girl (by Leah Poulter, toured to Circa 1986), Children of a Lesser God (by Mark Medoff, Maidment Theatre Auckland 1986) and Billy Bishop Goes to War (by John Gray and Eric Peterson, Circa Theatre 1987). In 2009 the 2008 Fortune production of A Streetcar Named Desire was revived at a Tennessee Williams Festival in Williamstown USA.

The Fortune presented the New Zealand professional premiere of the renaissance drama, The Revenger's Tragedy (Thomas Middleton, previously attributed to Cyril Tourneur), in 1995. Campbell Thomas directed and designed the production and a score was specially commissioned for it from Anthony Ritchie.

== Staffing ==
The Fortune was established by Murray Hutchinson, Alex Gilchrist, Huntly Eliott and Dr David Carnegie. The latter was the then Lecturer in Drama at the University of Otago and the others were television directors in the city. The last of the founders to leave was Alex Gilchrist in May 1980. He was succeeded by Anthony Richardson who had been the founder Artistic Director at Auckland's Mercury Theatre. Richardson died in May 1982. Ronald Branscombe was Acting Artistic Director until October 1982. The 1983 season was planned by Huntly Eliott and Keith Foote who was General Manager for that year. Anthony Taylor, who had been the Artistic Director at Wellington's Downstage Theatre from 1977 to 1981, was Artistic Director in 1984 and the first half of 1985. Lisa Warrington, Lecturer in Drama at the University of Otago, was Acting Artistic Director until the end of 1985. Campbell Thomas was appointed to commence as Artistic Director at the beginning of 1986 and was the Company's longest serving head, remaining until the end of 1999. He was succeeded as Artistic Director by Martin Howells from 2000 until 2004. Janice Marthen managed the theatre from 2005 until 2009. Karen Elliot managed the theatre in 2010. Lara MacGregor was artistic director from 2010 until 2015. Jonathan Hendry was Artistic Director from 2016 until it closed in 2018.

== Other Staff ==
Associate Directors: Lisa Warrington, Richard Finn (1987 - 1993)

Production Manager/Designers: Bruce Appelton, John Waite

Business Managers: Lindsay Shaw, Lynette Gernhoefer (1987 - 2007), Nicholas McBryde

Marketing Managers: Trish James, Peter Brown, Claire Dorking, Lisa Scott (2003-2008)

Wardrobe: Maryanne Wright-Smyth

Stage Managers and Technicians: Martin Phelan, Melinda Olykan, Erika Browne

== Education ==
The Fortune Theatre provided a range of options for schools such as tours around the theatre, and opportunities to talk to the cast and crew of a production. It also offered education workshops which were show-specific. The workshops were designed to link to a range of subjects in the New Zealand Curriculum, including NCEA achievement standards in subjects such as Drama at NCEA levels 1–3.

In addition, the Fortune Theatre hosted a drama ambassador programme to engage students with the theatre by offering opportunities to attend rehearsals as well as complimentary tickets. This programme began in 2005 with 19 schools in the Otago and Southland region areas of New Zealand.

== Larnach – Castle of Lies ==
In 1994, the Fortune Theatre performed a play about the tragedies of William Larnach's family, titled "Larnach – Castle of Lies", before 100 invited guests in the ballroom of Larnach Castle. The play seems to have stirred up the reputed ghostly residents of the castle.

"It was a night to remember. As the guests arrived a terrible storm blew up from nowhere. The smoke from the fires blew back down the chimneys so that you couldn't see – and your eyes hurt. Hail crashed on the iron roof so that you couldn't hear. Doors mysteriously opened by themselves and it got very cold. In the play – just as Larnach shot himself there was a blinding white light. Afterwards at supper people were talking about the lightning strike as Larnach held the gun to his head. I said `Oh no that was stage effects.' We asked the stage manager. He said `It was none of our doing, it was lightning.' I think that Larnach was present that night. He didn't like the play."
-- Margaret Barker (Co-owner of Larnach Castle)

The former Trinity Methodist Church building is also reputedly haunted. As a result, it was the subject of a 2005 episode of New Zealand television reality series Ghost Hunt.
