= Bonar Dunlop =

New Zealand artist

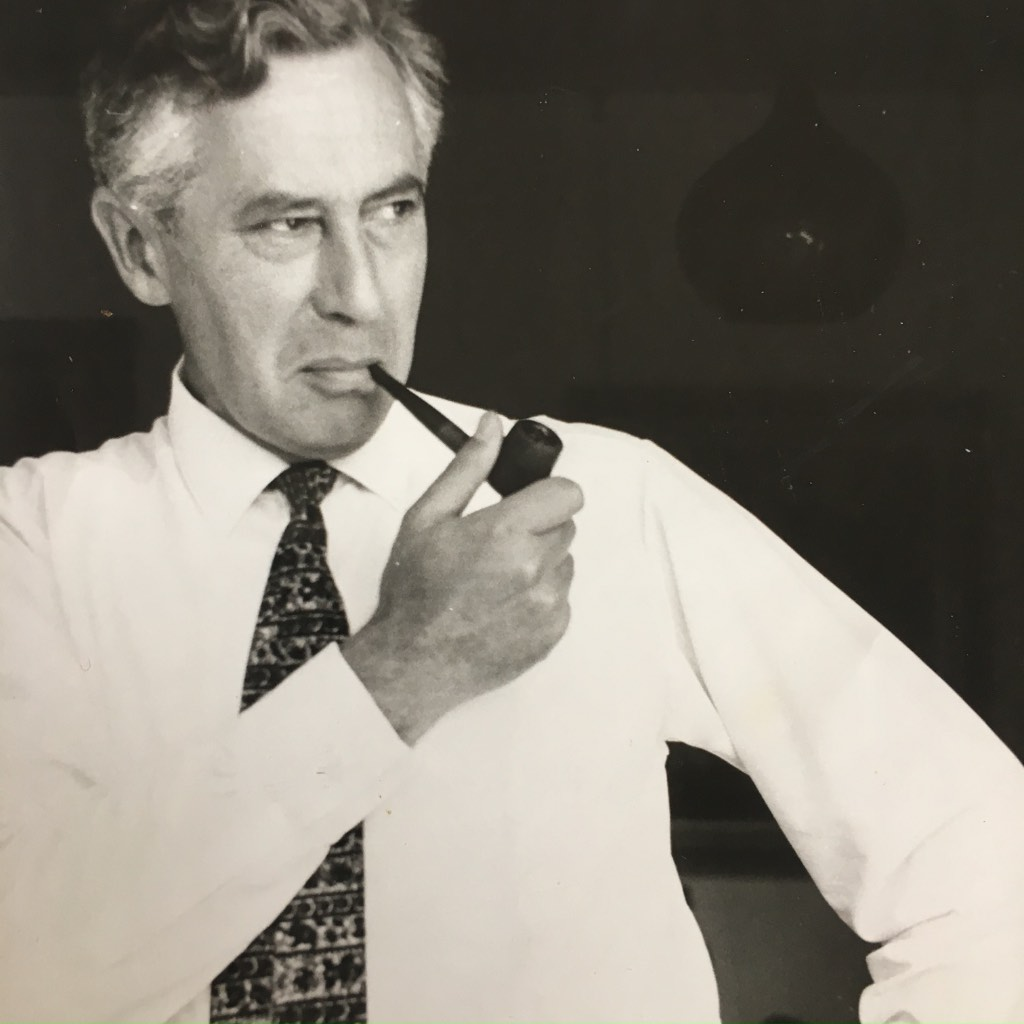

John Bonar Dunlop ARBS (1916–1992) was a New Zealand artist, sculptor, and illustrator who excelled at figurative work. He later became known for his sculptures of New Zealand and Welsh rugby players.

Born in Dunedin, the son of Francis Dunlop, who lectured in moral philosophy at the University of Otago and who was also a Presbyterian minister, he grew up on the family farm. Shona Dunlop MacTavish (1920–2019) was his younger sister. At the farm, Dunlop learned to ride proficiently and developed a love of horses that never left him, clearly visible in his later sculptures and illustrations. After the death of his father in his teens, the family moved to Europe, settling in the cultural hotbed of Vienna in the mid-1930s. With the political turmoil of Central Europe, after two years they moved on to Paris. Dunlop then continued to London to study at the Royal Academy Schools, where he won the prestigious Landseer Prize.

This was interrupted in early 1940 when he volunteered to serve in Finland's short-lived 'Winter War', where his horse-riding abilities paid off. Once the volunteers were demobbed, with Norway now under Nazi occupation, he and a companion attempted to escape on foot via the Arctic Circle. https://www.newstatesman.com/world/europe/2022/06/molotov-cocktails-finland-winter-war-against-russia. Their marathon failed when they were arrested, but he then found his way to Stockholm where he attended art-school for 18 months before eventually regaining Britain by plane. There he joined the Royal Air Force and trained as a pilot in South Africa before flying on operations from bases in North Africa and Italy.

After the war, in 1946, he moved to Sydney to join some of his family and attended Sydney Technical College. Here, in 1947, he married his teenage sweetheart from Vienna, Hilary Lennox Napier, an English dancer, and began a successful career as an illustrator, at that time mainly dramatic works for women's magazines and for books. Until 1958-9 they lived in an extraordinary house in Whale Beach, where they had two children. He was the subject of Arthur Murch's portrait, which won the 1949 Archibald Prize. In 1959 the family moved definitively to London where Dunlop thrived further as an illustrator, contributing to numerous high visibility advertising campaigns (Harrods, Rothmans, Lee Cooper, etc.).

Since his time in Australia he had often worked on book illustration, very much the 1950s vogue, and in the 1960s he provided new covers and internal illustrations for Ruby Ferguson's Jill books - Jill's Gymkhana, Jill's Riding Club, A Stable for Jill - and later the paperback versions of the books.

Although his primary career was as an illustrator and commercial artist, his real passion was for sculpture, and in the early 1970s he became a full-time sculptor, creating busts and sporting pieces, primarily of rugby players. His first one-man show was in London in 1975, and he subsequently exhibited at the Academy of Fine Arts in Wellington and in Dunedin. Other shows followed in Edinburgh and Wales, and he was commissioned to do numerous portraits of sports personalities for trophies and private collections. After living in north London, Dunlop and his wife spent the latter part of their lives between a house in Mojácar, Spain, and Sussex, England, where he died on his 76th birthday.

In 2002 an exhibition of his lively sketches and drawings, 1936–45, was held at the Galerie Beckel-Odille-Boicos in Paris, and in 2004 a major exhibition of his rugby sculptures and sketches was held at the Museum of Rugby in Twickenham.
