= Hubert Ryburn =

Presbyterian minister, university college master

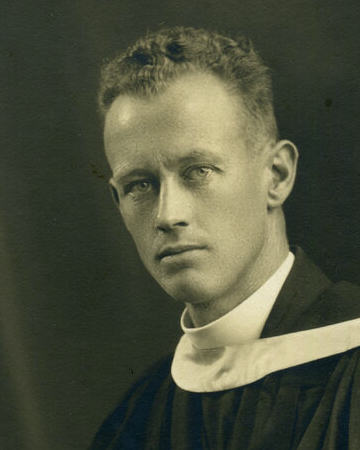
Ryburn in 1929

Hubert James Ryburn CMG (19 April 1897 – 30 June 1988) was a notable New Zealand Presbyterian minister and university college master. He was born in Gisborne, New Zealand, on 19 April 1897.

In the 1959 Queen's Birthday Honours, Ryburn was appointed a Companion of the Order of St Michael and St George.

Academic offices
Preceded by David Craig Herron	Chancellor of the University of Otago; 1955–1970	Succeeded by Stuart Sidey
