= Playhouse Theatre, Dunedin =

Theatre in Dunedin, New Zealand

Coordinates: 45.86608°S 170.50903°E

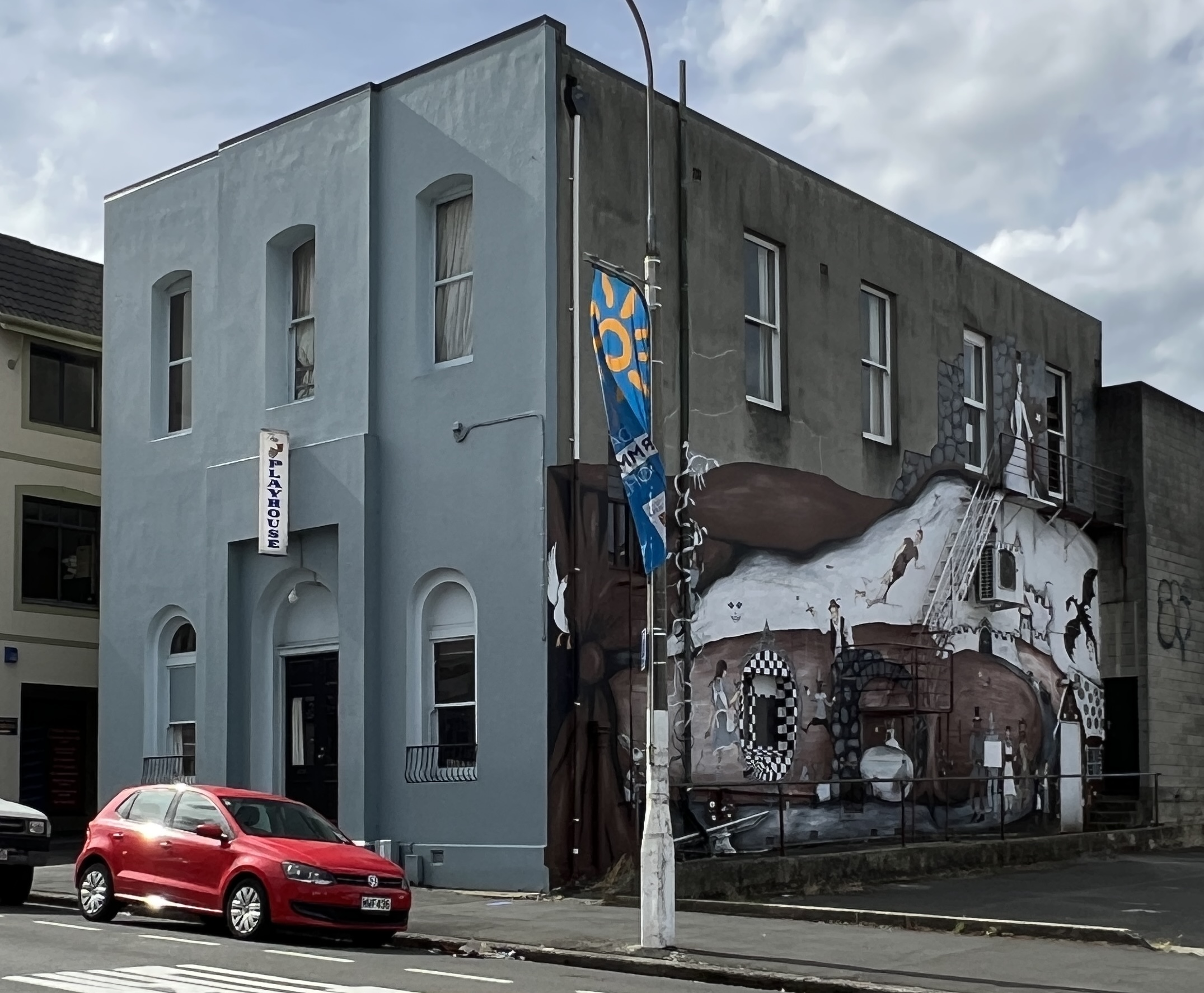
- Interactive map of Playhouse Theatre, Dunedin
- Location: 31 Albany Street, Dunedin
- Operator: Ancient Order of Foresters Friendly Society (1876–1960); Southern Comedy Players (1961–1969); Southern Theatre Trust (1969); Dunedin Repertory Society (1969–present)
- Capacity: 130-seat

Website
- https://www.playhousetheatre.co.nz/

The Playhouse Theatre is a theatre in Dunedin, New Zealand. It was converted from a lodge into a 100-seat theatre by the Southern Comedy Players in 1962. Since the late 1960s it has been home to the Dunedin Repertory Society, who regularly perform youth productions for children.

== Southern Comedy Players ==
The building, at 31 Albany Street, dates from 1876, and was converted from the Foresters' Lodge Hall in 1962 by William Menlove and Bernard Esquilant for theatre company Southern Comedy Players. When opened the theatre had 100 seats, and the "Stage Set" cafe and a craft exhibition space on the top floor.

The repertoire for the Southern Comedy Players included contemporary West End comedy, musicals, classics and dramas. The Southern Comedy Players became the Southern Theatre Trust which folded in 1970.

== Dunedin Repertory Society ==
The Playhouse is home to the Dunedin Repertory Society, which was formed in 1931 but has been based at The Playhouse since the late 1960s. The Society currently specialises in youth productions, and regularly performs youth productions for children in the school holidays. Recent productions have included The Hunting of the Snark, adapted from Lewis Carroll by Diane Dupres, in April 2021, and Treasure Island; Sleeping Beauty is an up-coming production for July 2021. The Playhouse also hosts an annual adult production, past productions have included a professional production of Aristophanes' The Clouds, directed by Harry Love in 2019, and Never the Sinner, by John Logan, directed by Lewis Ablett-Kerr.

During 2020 the society had to move productions to Logan Park High School due to a leaking roof. The roof was subsequently replaced using a grant from the Dunedin Heritage Fund, which was the first renovation work since the conversion in the 1960s. In April 2021, the Society's President Jemma Adams called for public input into the future of the building, which is in need of significant further renovation.

In June 2026, the Repertory Society marked the 150th birthday of the theatre with a "Grand Old Playhouse Music Hall" show, intended to help raise funds to repair the building. A grant from Dunedin City Council for $3 million required the Society to raise a further $2.5 million for urgent roof repairs, refurbishment and accessibility upgrades.

== Musical Theatre ==
Some of Dunedin Operatic Inc.'s early productions [now Musical Theatre Dunedin] were staged in the Playhouse Theatre.

== Notable alumni ==
Ryan O'Kane began his acting career performing with Playhouse Theatre, aged 5.

== Awards ==
At the 2019 Dunedin Theatre Awards, the Playhouse was awarded Outstanding Contribution to Children's Theatre.
