= Jocelyn Ryburn =

President of the New Zealand Plunket Society

Jocelyn Maud Ryburn OBE (née Dunlop, 6 February 1910 – 5 April 1980) was a long-serving President of the New Zealand Plunket Society.

== Early life ==
Ryburn was born in Invercargill on 6 February 1910. Her father was Reverend Francis Wallace Dunlop and her grandfather was Professor of Theology at Otago University. In 1913, Ryburn's father was appointed professor of philosophy at Otago, and the family moved to Dunedin. There Ryburn attended Archerfield College, followed by the Otago School of Art. Ryburn met Hubert James Ryburn at St. Andrew's Church, Dunedin, and they were married at Knox Church on 24 March 1931.

== Adult life ==
Ryburn's husband was appointed master of Knox College in 1941, and the couple lived there while raising their four children. Ryburn helped establish the Plunket Society in Opoho and the North-East Valley suburbs, and was the first chairwoman of the branch. In 1953 she was elected to the New Zealand Plunket Council and in 1957 became president. She held this position until 1970. One of her campaigns during her presidency was for increased government subsidies for Plunket nurses' salaries. As part of this campaign, Ryburn sat on a joint steering committee with representatives of the Department of Health to investigate whether mothers in new housing areas had access to appropriate health services for their babies.

From 1963 until 1974 Ryburn was warden of St. Margaret's College. She also served on the Board of Governors of Columba College. In the 1970 New Year Honours, Ryburn was appointed an Officer of the Order of the British Empire, for services to the Plunket Society.

Ryburn died on 5 April 1980 following an accidental fall.
