= Queen Margaret College =

Queen Margaret College may refer to:

- Queen Margaret College (Edinburgh) 1992–1998, later Queen Margaret University College 1999–2006, now Queen Margaret University, Musselburgh, East Lothian, Scotland
- Queen Margaret College (Glasgow), a former higher education institution in Glasgow, United Kingdom
- Queen Margaret College (Wellington), an independent all-girls high school in Wellington, New Zealand
