= St Andrew's Presbyterian Church, Dunedin =

St Andrew's Presbyterian Church
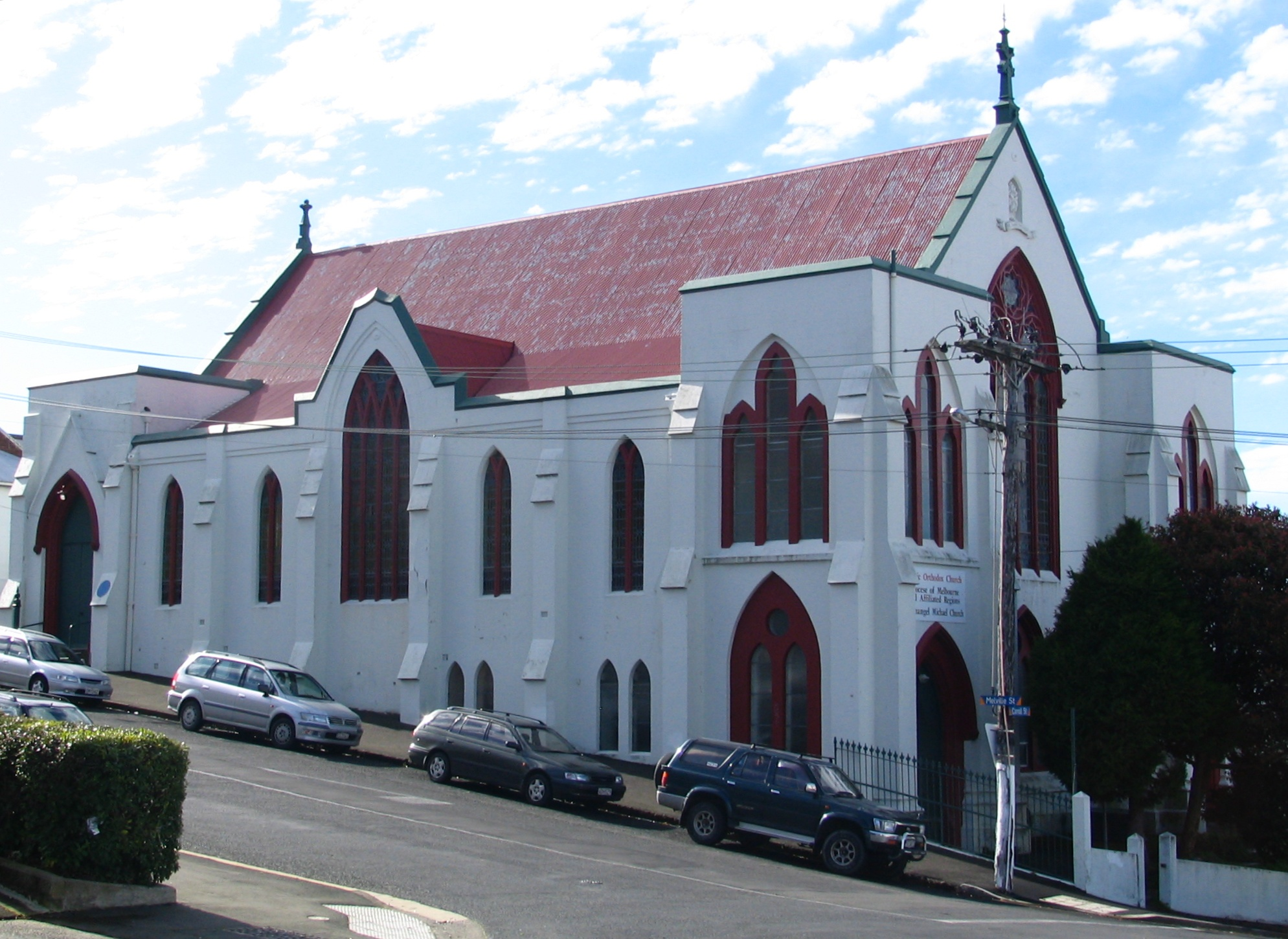
- Archangel Michael Coptic Orthodox Church in 2009
- St Andrew's Presbyterian Church
- 45.88184182750472°S 170.49586656792272°E
- Location: Corner of Carroll and Melville Streets, Dunedin
- Country: New Zealand
- Denomination: Presbyterian (1870–1978); Word of Life Pentecostal Church (1978–2000); Coptic Orthodox Church (2000 to the present)

Architecture
- Architect: R. A. Lawson
- Style: Gothic Revival
- Years built: 1870

Heritage New Zealand – Category 1
- Designated: 25 November 1982

St Andrew's Presbyterian Church was a prominent church in Dunedin, New Zealand. Designed by pre-eminent Dunedin Robert Lawson it was constructed in 1870 to serve a rapidly developing area of the city which became notorious for its slum housing, poverty and crime which led to it being referred to as the "Devil's Half-Acre" from 1873 onwards. The church is best known for its long time crusading minister the Reverend Rutherford Waddell. Waddell's 'Sin of Cheapness' sermon which was a landmark in New Zealand's social and labour history was delivered from its pulpit. It eventually closed as a place of Presbyterian worship in 1978 and after briefly serving as a place of worship for the Word of Life Pentecostal Church it was purchased by the Coptic Orthodox Church in 2000, who renamed it the Archangel Michael Coptic Orthodox Church.

The building is listed by Heritage New Zealand as a Category 1 structure.

== History ==
=== The developing area ===
Attracted by the discovery of gold at Gabriel's Gully in central Otago in 1861, Dunedin was transformed by large numbers of gold seeking immigrants flooding to the settlement. Many of these newcomers set up a tent town on vacant land of the slopes of the foothills near the harbour close to Stafford and Walker (now Carroll) Streets. Bounded by Maitland, Maclaggan and Princes Streets, the tents began to be replaced by cheaply constructed wooden shacks, which were overlooked by the houses of Dunedin's elite on the upper slopes. At the time the settlement had two congregations that of First Church under the Reverend Thomas Burns and Knox Church under the Reverend Donald McNaughton Stuart.

In response to the growing population Stuart began preaching from a candle box at the foot of Stafford Street. At this time Rachel Reynolds the wife of prominent businessman William Reynolds held the freehold of two acres of land situate along Melville street, from Walker to Stafford street, four chains down both these streets, which she leased for 21 years to David John Napier. Following the discovery of gold Napier had on sub-leased to merchant Henry Cook. Cook soon came to the view that it was necessary to provide some temporary church accommodation to service the growing community, and made an offer, free of rent, of a quarter of an acre for the purpose. The offer was accepted by the Deacon's Court of Knox Church. A committee was formed, consisting of Henry Cook, John Gillies, Charles Kettle, Charles Street, and Robert Gillies, that was able to arrange for a wooden framework covered by canvas to be erected on section 41 of Stafford Street. Measuring 120 feet (37 m) by 50 feet (15 m) it had no flooring, and could seat 250 worshippers. The service in this chapel which opened on 21 November 1861 was conducted by lay members of Knox Church.

As attendance increased it became apparent that the chapel had sufficient attendees to establish a third congregation in Dunedin. Arrangements were made with Cook and Rachel Reynolds, that the former in his sub-lease from Napier should give up the ½ acre section on the corner of Walker (now Carroll) and Melville Streets. Reynolds' trustees then granted a lease for some 15 years of the section at a rental of 1 shilling per annum, with a purchasing clause at the end of the lease of £300. Led by Rachel Reynold's husband William Reynolds a sum of approximately £500 was collected. This allowed the erection of a wooden church which could accommodate approximately 360 worshipers. In March 1862 the presbytery approved the erection of a timber church with the Reverend Glasgow as its minister. This church which was known as the Walker Street Church opened on 4 May 1862. For a period of eight to nine months Reynolds acted as its only office-bearer forcing him to act as bellman, doorkeeper, and even occasionally to officiate as precentor, and on one or two occasions as minister. Eventually the other two Dunedin churches offered their support with E. B. Cargill and P. W. Hutton from Knox Church, and James Sounnes from First Church agreeing to serve alongside William Reynolds as office-bearers.

After being declared a ministerial charge in June 1863 the office bearers were able to secure the services of the Rev. Adam Glasgow as the church's first minister. Unfortunately his health had been undermined by prior service in India, and after finding the work to be too erroneous he resigned, dying shortly afterwards. He was succeeded by the Rev. Donald Meiklejohn. Shortly after Meikejohn's induction new office-bearers were elected. At their first meeting it was agreed that St Andrew's should be used as name for the church. As well as the Reynolds the church was fortunate in that among its congregation were a number of prominent citizens, among whom were E.B. Cargill, printer and bookseller Thomas Coull. As well as being a founder and lifelong member of the St Andrew's congregation Rachel Reynolds had a lifelong commitment to charity work and among other causes was to be pioneer in establishing free early childhood education in the New Zealand, campaign for girl's and women's education and a suffragist.

=== Construction of a new church ===
Meiklejohn in turn was succeeded by Robert Scrimgeour. During Scrimgeour's pastorate the population in the area continuing to increase and it had become apparent by 1865 that a larger church was required to accommodate the congregation. A committee was appointed to consider the matter and they had plans drawn up for a church capable of accommodating 500 worshippers. However lack of money delayed any further progress. By 1868, the parish was able to freehold the site, and in September of that year, the Deacon's Court had approved the plans proposed by prominent local architect Robert Lawson. The design was unusual for Lawson as it was rectangular with four towers. Lawson's original design had a 127 feet (39 m) spire on the south west corner of the building, but this was never built. To provide room for the new church the existing building was pulled down and re-erected at Caversham, where it had served for many years as a church.

The contract to construct the church was awarded to Hunter & Goodfellow who were also responsible for the construction of a number of other Lawson designs, including the First Church of Otago, East Taieri Presbyterian Church and the Bank of Otago at Oamaru. Hunter and Goodfellow commenced clearing the section in May 1869, and in under a year had it ready for its first Sabbath service on 14 February 1870. The carvings on the church were produced by stonemason and wood carver John Louis Godfrey who worked on First Church of Otago and the Cathedral Church of St Joseph.

In the 1870s Scrimgeour came into conflict with the congregation and resigned. He subsequently moved to Canada where he died in 1885. He was replaced by the Reverend John Gow (1815–1901), who while respected for his sincerity and earnestness was not regarded as an inspiring speaker. However under his care the church established a mission to work in the poorer areas of the rapidly developing parish. To assist in this mission to what was by now the city's de facto red-light district the church implemented a "Collection for the Poor" in February 1873 to provide funds for social services. These were distributed by the newly formed Ladies Association. A Sunday School was also established in the basement of the church.

The original European residents of the area bounded by Maitland, Maclaggan and Princes Streets were soon joined by Chinese migrants also drawn by the 1860s gold rushes and whose who had failed to prosper on the gold fields. It grew into a sprawling multi-ethnic mix of cheap housing, poverty, bars, prostitution, gambling, opium dens and factories. As a result, from 1873 onwards the area was increasingly known as the "Devil's Half-Acre". As well as being the home of the church, Walker Street was its notorious epicentre. This led it to being renamed Carroll Street by the City Council in 1916 in an attempt to escape its infamy. In the 1890s the cheapness of its rents attracted a growing Lebanese community of immigrants.

Gow served as minister for seven years before resigning in July 1878 to move to Opotiki in the Bay of Plenty. There in conjunction with his friend John Gordon he founded St John's Presbyterian Church.

=== Rutherford Waddell ===
There are claims that Gow had disgraced himself with drink which resolved the congregation to seek an exemplary candidate, which they felt could only be obtained by recruiting a minister from Scotland. In the intern a number of ministers served the congregation for a month at a time. One such temporary minister was the young Irish Presbyterian minister Rutherford Waddell, who came on the recommendation of the Rev. John Elmslie, the minister of St Paul's in Christchurch. The congregation was electrified by the first sermon Waddell preached and issued a call on the spot.. Years later a parishioner recalled the congregation's excited reaction. "I well remember the meeting on the footpath outside the Church door in Melville Street where excited groups of earnest men and women discussed the sermon, and it was then and there decided he would do for St Andrew's, and nobody else need apply."

In January 1879 two hundred and one members of St Andrew's congregation signed to call Waddell to become their minister with not a single dissenter. He accepted in early March and was inducted as the parish's minister on 18 April 1879, at a time when the congregation numbered about 300 members. At this time St Andrew's parish stretched from the lower reaches of prosperous Mornington, home to the middle-class as well as rich merchants and notable residents such as William Reynolds, seed merchants Robert Nimmo and John Blair, importer Alexander S. Paterson and drapery owner Thomas Brown – all the way down to the overcrowded slums and sleaze of the Devil's Half-Acre.

Waddell threw himself immediately into the life of his challenging parish, reinvigorating St Andrews after its hiatus without a permanent minister with the impassioned directness of his sermons soon won the confidence of the congregation. Under his leadership the debt on the church property was halved by the end of 1880, the Session strengthened and the Deacon's Court reorganized. In 1880, he set up the St Andrew's Young Men's Mutual Improvement Association to provide education and friendship that would "strengthen ... character".

By 1883, the church itself had been plastered, possibly in an attempt to manage dampness issues, and the basement floor was lined to provide space for the Sunday School which could accommodate 350 children. In 1885 the interior of the church was reconfigured to allow an organ to be installed. Between 1884 and 1885, a Warden's Cottage (caretaker's house) was built adjacent to the church.

The economic boom of the 1860s, driven by the discovery of gold, was followed by a long depression that started in the 1870s and extended into the 1890s. This worsened the living conditions of Dunedin's poor, many of them living in St Andrew's parish. Waddell believed that the Christian gospel should be actively interpreted through social justice so he responded with a number of practical church-based initiatives – the moribund Ladies Association was restructured within three years of his arrival and charged with distributing food, clothing, coal and blankets to the poor of the parish. It was later renamed the Friendly Aid Society and later still the Sisterhood of St Andrews. From 1883 St Andrew's also worked closely with the Salvation Army to improve social services to the poor and destitute of its parish.

Waddell had once worked long hours for nothing as a draper's apprentice in Banbridge so he was sympathetic to stories he became aware that women and children in the garment and footwear trades in Dunedin, were working 72-hour weeks in dirty, dangerous plants for nine shillings. Outworkers fared even worse with one woman receiving twopence for finishing a pair of trousers. In early October 1888 he delivered a sermon at St Andrew's Church on the "sin of cheapness", arguing that community's "enormous rage to get cheap things", was resulting in cost-cutting by manufacturers and middlemen. This practice was forcing prices down to a point where wages fell below subsistence level, a process known as "sweating". In November he took the matter to the Synod of the Presbyterian Church of Otago and Southland and a motion was passed deploring the existence of sweating in New Zealand. The sermon which is now regarded as a pivotal moment in New Zealand's labour history inspired George Fenwick, editor of the Otago Daily Times, to investigate. The resulting articles in the newspaper on the working conditions in clothing manufacturing and shoe making industries galvanised church, labour leaders and the public, leading to the establishment of a Royal Commission, on which Waddell reserved. While its majority report denied that "sweating" existed in New Zealand, it did recommend that a comprehensive new Factory Act and other sweeping reforms be implemented. Waddell's minority report declared that sweating was here. The commission's recommendations were an important part of the foundation for the social legislation of the 1890s.

In 1897 the church underwent extensive renovations, including redecoration of the interior. After an application for funding to the Church Extension Committee of the Dunedin Presbytery was turned down St Andrew's funded the construction of a mission hall in 1886 to provide a home for the church's outreach projects using money raised by a bazaar and from public lectures by Waddell. In the mission hall Waddell set up a savings bank, a free library.

In an effort to help the disadvantaged children in the parish Waddell in conjunction with Rachel Reynolds, journalist Mark Cohen and Lavinia Kelsey was instrumental in establishing the Dunedin Free Kindergarten Association. When the Rev. Donald Stuart refused to allow facilities at Knox Church to be made available for a kindergarten claiming that he would "far sooner see the children playing in the gutters than be brought under this new-fangled Yankee notion".. At Waddell's request, St Andrew's agreed to make available, rent free, the church's recently opened Walker Street Mission Hall. Gratefully accepted by the association the Walker Street Kindergarten opened on 10 June 1889 with an initial roll of 14. They were aged between 4 and 6, although 3 year-olds were soon admitted. It was the first free kindergarten in New Zealand.

The church expanded to include a Bible School in 1912.

=== Twentieth century ===
St Andrew's continued to emphasise social concerns. Realizing the limitations of voluntary efforts by the well-meaning middle-class women of the Friendly Aid Society, Waddell in 1901 suggested that a Deaconess be employed by the parish. He overcame the wariness of the Deacons Court by agreeing to personally fund from the proceeds of a lecture series her £90 salary for a one-year trial. He recruited Christabel Duncan, who had been one of the first to graduate from the Presbyterian Deaconess Institute in Melbourne, where such a programme was already in place, to the role in March 1901. Duncan's work among the poor in church's parish proved so successful, that by the end of her first year and the deacons became her enthusiastic supporters and other Dunedin parishes soon followed suit. The Presbyterian Deaconess movement quickly spread throughout New Zealand providing dedicated women who were effectively fulltime parish social workers. Duncan continued to act as the equivalent of a full time social worker for the next 22 years, and was actively involved in the expansion of the Presbyterian Women's Missionary Union. Her successors continued her work among the poor.

Waddell was deeply committed to overseas missions which resulted in the congregation raising £136 in 1905 to send Margaret Anderson (1877–1960) as a missionary to Canton now Guangzhou in China. By 1912 the church was supporting three missionaries.

In 1911 the church opened a dedicated Sunday school building on Carroll street which was designed on scientific lines to meet the requirements of modern education.

Recorded worshipers at St. Andrew's rose from 450 in 1910 to peak at 520 in 1916 and 1917 before declining as central city congregations lost worshippers due to population moving to the newly developing suburbs. From 1916 individual Presbyterian churches in Dunedin marked Anzac Day with united services where people from other Protestant denominations present. In 1918 St. Andrews held its first such service in 1918, at which 150 attended. An estimated 172 servicemen and five nursing sisters from the parish served during World War I with 27 of the men losing their lives.

Waddell retired from active work on 30 June 1919. He was succeeded by the Rev. Hector Maclean (1885–1968), an able preacher and a brilliant scholar. In December 1927 Maclean resigned to become professor of Old Testament in Ormond College, the Theological College of the Presbyterian Church of Victoria, Australia. The charge was declared vacant on 1 January 1928 with the Rev. E. J. Tipler appointed interim moderator of the church.

The Rev. Hubert Ryburn took permanent charge of the church in 1929. During the depression Ryburn worked with the deaconess, Sister Annie Cooke, in alleviating social distress in the parish.

In the 1920s and 1930s, St Andrew's underwent substantial alterations. In the 1920s, a design for new windows was submitted by Robert Henry Fraser, which were installed in 1921–1922. In the 1930s the church underwent major repairs during which it was re-rendered and painted. Unfortunately these repairs resulted in the loss of many of the external architectural features at roof level in particularly the battlements and crow-stepped gables.

In 1930 toilets were added to the church.

Beginning in 1938 there was a number of major interior and exterior renovations, which resulted in removal of much of the exterior detailing while the original slate roofing was replaced by corrugated steel.

After the Rev. Ryburn was appointed master of Knox College in Dunedin in 1941 the Rev. Ronald S. Watson answered the call from the congregation to succeed him and was inducted to take charge of the church on 4 April of that year.

The Dominion Conference of the Associated Churches of Christ was held at the church in 1946.

Over the latter part of the twentieth century membership of the congregation, began declining due to its ageing membership and demographic changes to its inner city parish. By 1960 membership had reduced to 215 and 65 by 1977.

On St Andrew's Day, 27 November 1977 an anniversary service, commemorating Waddell's "Sin of Cheapness" sermon was held, with lessons read by the managing director of Hallenstein Bros. Ltd and the Secretary of the Clothing Trades Union. At the service a plaque was unveiled near the side which commemorates the original sermon.

=== Leaves Presbyterian ownership ===
On 12 March 1978, the Presbyterians held their last service at St Andrew's Church, before the congregation merged with that of First Church. The building was subsequently sold to the Word of Life Pentecostal Church.

In 1981 an entrance building and doorway was added to the north end of the nave. In that same year it was necessary to replace the basement floor.

Between 1988 and 2003 the main rooms of basement were subdivided.

In 2000, the building was purchased by the Coptic Orthodox Church who renamed it the Archangel Michael Coptic Orthodox Church. In 2006 some of the windows were restored and new stained glass door panels were installed in the north wall and the extension. Created by Peter Mackenzie these depict the guardian angel of the Coptic Orthodox Church and the Archangel Michael.

== Description ==
The church is located on the intersection of Carroll and Melville Streets, with its long elevation on Melville Street, and its front elevation on Carroll Street.

The design of the Gothic Revival styled church was dictated by the sloping site which necessitated it being built over two levels. When built it could accommodate 650 worshipers. The main entrance is on Melville Street, which provides access to the ground floor, while the basement (planned as classrooms for Sunday School) is accessed internally, or from Carroll Street through a tower.

The rectangular church is 92 feet (28 m) by 61 feet (19 m) subdivided into a nave and two side aisles. The nave is 28 feet (8.5 m) wide with 13 feet (4.0 m) wide aisles. At each corner of the church is a battlemented 15 feet (4.6 m) square tower, finished with stone corbels and embrasured coping, at the base of which is an entrance porch, stairwell and vestry rooms. The ceiling is 35 feet (11 m) high and is lined with diagonal tongued and grooved beaded panelling.

The church is constructed of brick on bluestone foundations, with Oamaru stone facings with battlemented corner towers. The exterior walls are solid lime mortared brickwork (with no vertical cavity to act as a moisture barrier). The painted render which has been applied to the original brick is ruled and lined to imitate ashlar stonework. To the north is a modern extension and deck which provides level access from Melville Street.

The roof is clad in short run corrugated steel. On the north and south gables are roof finials with a saltire of St Andrew on the southern one.

The nave and aisles are finished with longitudinally and diagonally laid tongued, grooved and beaded timber linings.

Uphill from the church is a warden's cottage which is constructed of plastered brick.
