= Rutherford Waddell =

New Zealand Presbyterian minister and social reformer (1850–1932)

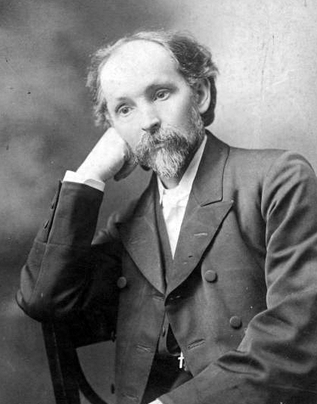
- Born: Between 1850 and 1852; Ballyroney, County Down, Ireland
- Died: 16 April 1932; Dunedin, New Zealand
- Occupation: Minister
- Years active: 1877–1919
- Known for: Presbyterian minister, social reformer and writer
- Spouse(s): Kathleen Maud Ashton Newman (1877–1920); Christabel Duncan (1923–1932)
- Children: A son who died in infancy Muriel Alice Newman
- Parent(s): Hugh Waddell and Margaret Reid
- Relatives: Brother of Hugh Waddell; Mary Waddell; William Waddell; Thomas Mayne Waddell; Helena Waddell; Jane Waddell; Lyons Waddell

Rutherford Waddell (1850–1932) was a New Zealand Presbyterian minister, social reformer and writer. He was born in Ireland, and after failing to finding a position as a missionary or a minister Waddell and his wife migrated to New Zealand in 1877. Settling in Dunedin, he led St Andrew's Presbyterian Church for forty years from 1879 to 1919. An important liberalizing influence in the Presbyterian church in New Zealand, he believed in the value of the ministry to promote social justice. He oversaw the establishment of a mission hall, savings bank, free library and free kindergarten within his parish, and promoted the founding of a number of cultural and sporting groups.

Waddell's most notable accomplishment in nineteenth-century New Zealand, however, was his crusade against sweat shops. In October 1888, his sermon "On the sin of cheapness", stirred many of the local community into action, which led to the establishment in 1890 of a royal commission on sweating. Its subsequent recommendations formed the basis of many of the country's social reforms of the following decade. Waddell was a believer in the value of trade unions, and became the first president of the Tailoresses' Union of New Zealand in July 1889.

== Biography ==
=== Early life and education ===
Rutherford Waddell was born in 1849 or 1850 in Glenarm, in County Antrim, Ireland. Other sources state that he was born between 1850 and 1852 and give his birthplace as Ballyroney, County Down, Ireland.

His parents were Margaret (née Reid, 1809–) and Hugh Waddell (1803–1875). His father was a Presbyterian minister while his mother was the daughter of a Presbyterian minister and the sister of the novelist Thomas Mayne Reid. One of eight children, many of his ancestors on both sides of the family had been ministers in Ulster for generations. Among them was the 17th century Scottish theologian Samuel Rutherford, after whom he was named. His older brother Hugh (1839–1901) became a minister and went on in 1869 to pioneer the Irish Presbyterian mission to China. Later he moved on to undertake a lifetime of missionary work in Japan. Waddell grew up in rural Antrim and Down. Waddell's mother died when he was young and his father was largely absent, which lead to him being brought up by his spinster aunt, Jean Reid, in a farmhouse at Annaghbane near Donaghmore in County Down. She continued to care for him when his father married Anne Atkinson and had two more children.

He did not enjoy his time at school, largely due to the cruelties of an abusive teacher. Despite becoming a frequent truant he developed a love of reading, remaining a prodigious reader for the rest of his life, of subjects including contemporary fiction, economics, sociology and theology.

He left school at the age of 14 to become a shop assistant in a drapery in the linen manufacturing town of Banbridge. After four years of working long hours he decided to follow the calling of his father as a minister which he said was due to hearing a sermon by a preacher in a country church and the example of his older brother Hugh. He graduated with an MA from Queen's University in Ireland in October 1875. He also studied at the Presbyterian Theological College, Belfast, from 1874 to 1876.

=== Immigrates to New Zealand ===
After being ordained at Newtownards in County Down, Waddell struggled to find employment, being rejected both for missionary service in Syria and by the congregation of Ballygrainey Presbyterian Church at Six Road Ends in Bangor. This led Waddell to accept an invitation to join the ministry of the Canterbury Presbyterian Church Extension Association, for which he would receive a salary of £200 per annum. He sailed with his wife Kathleen (who he had married in January 1877), to Lyttelton, New Zealand, on the Piako.

Following their arrival after an 89 day long voyage in May 1877, Waddell took a service at the Papanui Presbyterian Church and was then employed for three months as a relieving minister at St Paul's Church in Christchurch. He was then inducted to the charge of Prebbleton and Lincoln on 25 September 1877. This was a small parish and its congregation had struggled to pay the salary of the previous ministers.

=== St Andrews Church ===
Following the resignation of its previous minister, the Reverend John Gow in July 1878, St Andrew's Presbyterian Church in Dunedin began looking for a replacement. There were claims that Gow had disgraced himself with drink which resolved the congregation to seek an exemplary candidate, which they felt could only be obtained by recruiting a minister from Scotland. In the interim a number of ministers served the congregation for a month at a time. One planned temporary minister was Rutherford Waddell, who came with the recommendation of the Rev. John Elmslie, the minister of St Paul's in Christchurch. The congregation was electrified by the first sermon Waddell preached and issued a call on the spot. Years later a parishioner recalled the congregation's excited reaction. “I well remember the meeting on the footpath outside the Church door in Melville Street where excited groups of earnest men and women discussed the sermon, and it was then and there decided he would do for St Andrew's, and nobody else need apply.”

In January 1879 two hundred and one members of St Andrew's congregation signed to call Waddell to become their minister with not a single dissenter. He accepted in early March and was inducted as the parish's minister on 18 April 1879, at a time when the congregation numbered about 300 members. At the time of Waddell's appointment he was only the third Irishman to serve in the Otago Presbyterian Church as its ministers had until the 1860s been overwhelmingly recruited from the Scottish Free Church until a lack of ministers had forced them to consider other nationalities.

At this time St Andrew's parish stretched from the lower reaches of prosperous Mornington, home to the middle-class as well as rich merchants and notable residents such as William Reynolds, seed merchants Robert Nimmo and John Blair, importer Alexander S. Paterson and drapery owner Thomas Brown – all the way down to the overcrowded slums and sleaze of the Devil's Half-Acre.

Waddell threw himself immediately into the life of his challenging parish, reinvigorating St Andrews after its hiatus without a permanent minister with the impassioned directness of his sermons soon won the confidence of the congregation. Under his leadership the debt on the church property was halved by the end of 1880, the Session strengthened and the Deacon's Court reorganized.

In 1880, he set up the St Andrew's Young Men's Mutual Improvement Association to provide education and friendship that would "strengthen ... character".

After an application for funding to the Church Extension Committee of the Dunedin Presbytery was turned down St Andrew's funded the construction of a mission hall in 1886 to provide a home for the church's outreach projects using money raised by a bazaar and from public lectures by Waddell. In the mission hall Waddell set up a savings bank, a free library.

=== Stephenson tragedy ===
In the early 1880s Waddell attempted to mediate in the bitter estrangement of George Stephenson and his wife, Mary (née Stenhouse). After the couple separated Stephenson contributed nothing to the support of his wife and their two children, and Mary obtained a protection order against him. For his efforts threats were made against Waddell by George Stephenson. On the evening of 7 July 1883 Stephenson rushed up to his wife while she was out walking in Manor Place, seized her round the neck with his left arm, and pulled a dynamite cartridge out of his pocket, which he detonated, blowing both their heads off. Waddell officiated at Mary's funeral.

=== The Sin of Cheapness ===
The economic boom of the 1860s, driven by the discovery of gold, was followed by a long depression in New Zealand that started in the 1870s and extended into the 1890s. This worsened the living conditions of Dunedin's poor, many of them living in St Andrew's parish. Waddell believed that the Christian gospel should be actively interpreted through social justice so he responded with a number of practical church-based initiatives – the moribund Ladies Association was restructured within three years of his arrival and charged with distributing food, clothing, coal and blankets to the poor of the parish. It was later renamed the Friendly Aid Society and later still the Sisterhood of St Andrews. From 1883 St Andrew's also worked closely with the Salvation Army to improve social services to the poor and destitute of its parish. Waddell had once worked long hours for no pay during his time as a draper's apprentice in Banbridge so he was sympathetic when he became aware that women and children in the garment and footwear trades in Dunedin, were working 72-hour weeks in dirty, dangerous plants for nine shillings. Outworkers fared even worse with one woman receiving twopence for finishing a pair of trousers. As the depression continued wages were reduced in the clothing industry in 1877, followed a year later by warehousemen having their wages reduced and manufacturers further cutting wages and employing more women and children as they cost less than skilled male workers. Early in 1888, Waddell delivered a series of lectures on social issues in the St Andrews Church Hall. In the fourth lecture he covered socialism.

Following on from these lectures he delivered a sermon at St Andrew's Church in early October 1888 on the "sin of cheapness", arguing that community's "enormous rage to get cheap things", was resulting in cost-cutting by manufacturers and middlemen. This practice was forcing prices down to a point where wages fell below subsistence level, a process known as “sweating”. The sermon (of which no copies have survived), is regarded as a pivotal moment in New Zealand's labour history as it inspired George Fenwick, editor of the Otago Daily Times and the paper's chief reporter Silas Spragg to take up the issue. The resulting articles in the newspaper on the working conditions in clothing manufacturing and shoe making industries galvanized church, labour leaders and the public, In November 1888 Waddell took the matter to the Synod of the Presbyterian Church of Otago and Southland which passed a motion passed deploring the existence of sweating in New Zealand. Waddell in letters pushed for the appointment of a royal commission on female labour and for the formation of trade unions among female workers.

When no other body took up the cause he organized what was a well-attended public meeting in the Athenaeum Hall on 14 February 1889. Chaired by William Downie Stewart the meeting agreed that a committee be formed to support better working conditions and better pay for those living on low wages. Among the eight members of the committee were Waddell, William Downie Stewart Sr, Winifred Bathgate, Rachel Reynolds and Silas Spragg. Over the following weeks, the committee came to the opinion that agreeing on minimum wage rates were the best means of improving working conditions. After being approached Dunedin individual employers agreed not to hire any contractor who did not pay the minimum wage. However, in May the four major warehousing firms of Bing, Harris and Co.; Butterworth Brothers; Ross and Glendining; and Sargood, Son, and Ewen wrote a joint letter to the committee arguing that unless minimum wage rates were agreed throughout New Zealand, Dunedin firms could not compete. They refused to require their contractors to pay minimum wages and suggested that the committee deal directly between contractor and worker.

Waddell called another public meeting in the Choral Hall on the 7 June at which the committee appointed by the earlier meeting presented its report. Chaired by William Downie Stewart, among those present in the packed hall were Winifred Bathgate, Rachel Reynolds, Otago Daily Times editor George Fenwick, politician Sir Robert Stout, mayor Henry Fish and other Dunedin politicians, unionists, business leaders and clergy including the Revs, James Gibb and J. Gibson-Smith. Waddell in his speech again made the case for improving wages and working conditions, naming and shaming the warehousing companies that were refusing to assist in improving wages.

Following on from that meeting Waddell together with Rachel Reynolds and the country's leading female unionist Harriet Morison was instrumental in founding the Tailoresses Union of New Zealand on the 11 July 1889. Waddell was offered the position of its first president, which he accepted. Under his leadership, the union at negotiations on wages threatened strike action which assisted in persuading manufacturers to agree to minimum rates. Waddell also campaigned to reduce the long hours being worked by shop assistants and urged people to pledge to abstain from shopping after 6 pm. This led to the formation of the Dunedin Early Closing Association, with Waddell assisting in establishing what eventually became its replacement the New Zealand Draper's Assistant Union in March 1890. He also encouraged the formation of the New Zealand Domestic Servant's Union and in 1892 supported the Dunedin Shorthand Writer's Association.

In response to the public agitation stirred up by Waddell the conservative Atkinson government decided to appoint a royal commission to investigate working conditions in selected industries. As a result of pressure from Waddell who had agreed to be one of its nine commissioners the government agreed to include shop girls, who were made to stand for at least 12–14 hours a day in the inquiry. The Sweating Commission heard first-hand evidence of low wages, long hours of 60, 70, 80 hours a week, poor working conditions, ill health, inadequate often poorly enforced legislation. While its majority report denied that "sweating" as it existed in London and elsewhere did not exist existed in New Zealand. It did however recommend that a comprehensive new Factory Act and other sweeping reforms be implemented. Waddell and two of the commissioners issued a minority report that arguing that “sweating” was present in New Zealand. The commission's recommendations were an important part of the foundation for the progressive labour and industrial legislation of the early 1890s introduced by John Ballance's Liberal party.

Waddell abstained from drinking alcohol and was a supporter for the Women's Suffrage he worked with Harriet Morison and Rachel Reynolds in the temperance and female suffrage campaigns of the early 1890s.

=== Heresy trial of James Gibb ===
In 1890 Waddell's friend James Gibb, the minister of the First Church of Otago was accused of heresy by conservative members of his congregation for attacking the Presbyterian Church's doctrine of election to grace, and that infants who died before baptism could not enter heaven. At his trial in June 1890 before the Presbytery of Dunedin Waddell, spoke in defense of Gibb, arguing that his only crime was to have made public views discreetly held in private by many members of Presbytery. Gibb was acquitted by sixteen votes to six. While his accusers successfully appealed to the Synod of the Presbyterian Church of Otago and Southland, no penalty was imposed.

Waddell was a supporter of a law change in 1894 to the country's divorce laws, which made it difficult for women to divorce their husbands, while it was relatively easier for the husband to divorce his wife. Waddell wanted desertion and drunkenness to be incorporated into the legislation.

=== Dunedin free kindergarten ===
In an effort to help the disadvantaged children in the parish Waddell in conjunction with Rachel Reynolds, journalist Mark Cohen (1849–1928) and Lavinia Kelsey was instrumental in establishing the Dunedin Free Kindergarten Association. When the Rev. Donald Stuart refused to allow facilities at Knox Church to be made available for a kindergarten claiming that he would "far sooner see the children playing in the gutters than be brought under this new-fangled Yankee notion". At Waddell's request, St Andrew's agreed to make available, rent free, the church's recently opened Walker Street Mission Hall. Gratefully accepted by the association the Walker Street Kindergarten opened on 10 June 1889 with an initial roll of 14. They were aged between 4 and 6, although 3 year-olds were soon admitted. It was the first free kindergarten in New Zealand. Waddell was so highly regarded that 700 people attended a function in Agricultural Hall on 26 April 1900 to celebrate his 21 years of service as minister of St Andrew's.

=== Establishment of a deaconess service ===
St Andrew's continued to emphasize social concerns. Realizing the limitations of voluntary efforts by the well-meaning middle-class women of the Friendly Aid Society, Waddell in 1901 suggested that a Deaconess be employed by the parish. The Methodist Church had already brought Sister Olive from Australia to work in Dunedin. Waddell overcame the wariness of the Deacons Court by agreeing to personally fund from the proceeds of a lecture series her £90 salary for a one-year trial. He wrote to the Principal of the Presbyterian Deaconess Training Institute in Melbourne, to select a suitable person for Dunedin. They chose Sister Christabel Duncan, who had been one of its first graduates. She came (after some initial reluctance and excuses) in March 1901. Upon her arrival in Dunedin one local minister commented after noting her youth and vivacity that she was “too frivolous”. Duncan's work among the poor in church's parish proved so successful, that by the end of her first year the deacons of St Andrews became her enthusiastic supporters. Other Dunedin parishes soon followed suit. The Deaconess Order was established in NZ in 1903, which was followed by the creation in Dunedin of the Presbyterian Women's Training Institute (PWTI) later that same year. The Presbyterian Deaconess movement quickly spread throughout New Zealand providing dedicated women who were effectively fulltime parish social workers.

Waddell was deeply committed to overseas missions which resulted in the congregation raising £136 in 1905 to send Margaret Anderson (1877–1960) as a missionary to Canton now Guangzhou in China. By 1912 the church was supporting three missionaries.

Lightly built and with a slight speech impediment, Waddell pushed himself to his physical limits, which forced him to take sick leave in 1882, 1886, 1902 and 1913. The last years of his ministry were hampered by severe deafness.

Waddell retired from active work on 30 June 1919, citing old age. He had purchased a retirement house at Broad bay on the Otago Peninsula in November 1917 which he named “Dreamthorp”. In his retirement he took regular trips to Australia, England, Scotland and Ireland.

== Other activities ==
Waddell wrote on a number of theological and social subjects, and was contributor to various magazines. In 1894 he founded and was first editor of the Christian Outlook (later called the Outlook) – the official weekly of the Presbyterian Church in New Zealand. Forced in 1902 by a breakdown in health to give up that responsibility, he continued to write columns for the Evening Star under the byline ”‘Ror” for 27 years. Waddell's first important publication was a volume of sermons, entitled Behold the Lamb of God which had a wide circulation. This success saw him published smaller volumes of sermons entitled The Voyage of Life and The Building of the Ship. In later years he usually issued annually a small volume of sermons or essays, among which were At the Turn of the Year, Killed in Action, Until the Day Dawn, Old Christmases, My Pathway to Christ, The Romance of God, The Dynamic of Service, In the Doldrums, The Fiddles of God and Memories and Hopes. In 1929 when a fellowship of New Zealand writers was formed he was nominated as its first president.

Waddell was one of the founders of the Prison Reform Association.

He was a founding member in September 1888 of the Dunedin Suburban Reserves Conservation Society (which later changed its name to the Amenities and Town Planning Society) and was also a member of the movement that resulted in the formation of the Technical Classes’ Association.

== Death ==
In late March 1932, Waddell was admitted into Stafford Hospital in Dunedin for a minor operation. However complications set in, and he died from uraemia at the hospital on Saturday 16 April 1932. Despite his wishes of cremation, he was buried with his first wife Kathleen in Block 21A, Plot 13A of the Southern Cemetery in Dunedin on 19 April 1932.

== Honours ==
For his services to the Presbyterian Church the Theological College of Belfast awarded him an honorary doctor of divinity in 1897.

In August 2012 the University of Otago's Centre for Theology and Public Issues organized a one-day conference in Burns Hall in Dunedin which celebrated the life, work and legacy of Waddell. Titled “No Sweat! Rutherford Waddell and the Sin of Cheapness” its keynote speaker was Helen Kelly, president of the New Zealand Council of Trade Unions. Papers were presented by well-known historians and religious scholars Tony Ballantyne, Andrew Bradstock, Peter Lineham, Peter Matheson, Hugh Morrison, John Stenhouse, and Yvonne Wilke. There was also a dramatic reconstruction by Richard Hubber of Waddell's famous sermon.

A plaque placed by the New Zealand Historic Places Trust to the left of an entrance door on the outside of the former St Andrew's Presbyterian Church records that ‘Here in 1888 the Rev. Rutherford Waddell, 1849–1932 preached on “The Sin of Cheapness” and spelled an end to sweated labour’.

A Waddell Chapel with two stained glass windows was established in a room at the Deaconesses College. The name continued at Salmond Hall, which opened in the grounds of Knox College in 1971. The Christabel and Rutherford Waddell Chapel was dedicated two years later.

== Personal life ==
Waddell married 22-year-old Kathleen Maud Ashton Newman of Listowel in County Kerry on 22 January 1877 in Dublin, Ireland. The couple had two children, a son who died in infancy and a daughter, Muriel Alice Newman, who was born on 28 April 1882. Muriel married a Gerald Anderson and eventually settled in Australia.

Kathleen Waddell suffered from a severe case of rheumatoid arthritis and after years of being a chronic invalid she was admitted in 1917 to Seacliff Mental Hospital, where she died on 7 September 1920.

At the age of 72 Waddell married 47 year old Christabel Duncan at Melbourne on 3 December 1923. Duncan was the deaconess at St Andrew's Church. Duncan had been born on 4 August 1876 and was ordained as a deaconess on 17 March 1901 following her graduation from the Deaconess College in Melbourne, Australia. She served as deaconess at St Andrew's from 1901 to 1923, with the exception of two years leave to work for Presbyterian Women's Missionary Union (PWMU) from 1919 to 1921 during which she was actively involved in its expansion and served as its travelling secretary. She later served as secretary of the PWMU from 1935 to 1943. Following her husband's death she was engaged in Wellington City Work for the PSSA from 1944 to 1948. She died at the age of 86 on 20 September 1962 in Sydney, Australia.
