= Charles Tringham =

New Zealand architect

Charles Tringham (1841–1916) was a New Zealand architect. Born in Winforton, Hertfordshire, England, Tringham moved to Wellington and established himself as an architect, his marriage elevated his social status and he went onto design grand buildings for high-profile individuals such as the Queen Margaret College Tower for Thomas Coldham Williams and Westoe for Sir William Fox. Tringham later served as president of the Wellington Association of Architects before retiring to the Wairarapa as a farmer. From 1867 to 1890 Tringham was responsible for over 330 designs. Several of Tringham's surviving works have heritage registration.

== Early life ==
Tringham was born in Winforton, Hertfordshire, England, in 1841. It is believed that Tringham was educated in woodworking in England. On December 1864, Tringham arrived in Auckland aboard the Talbot and gave his occupation as a carpenter. Tringham soon left for Wellington and started a partnership with builder William Lawes.

== Transition to architecture ==
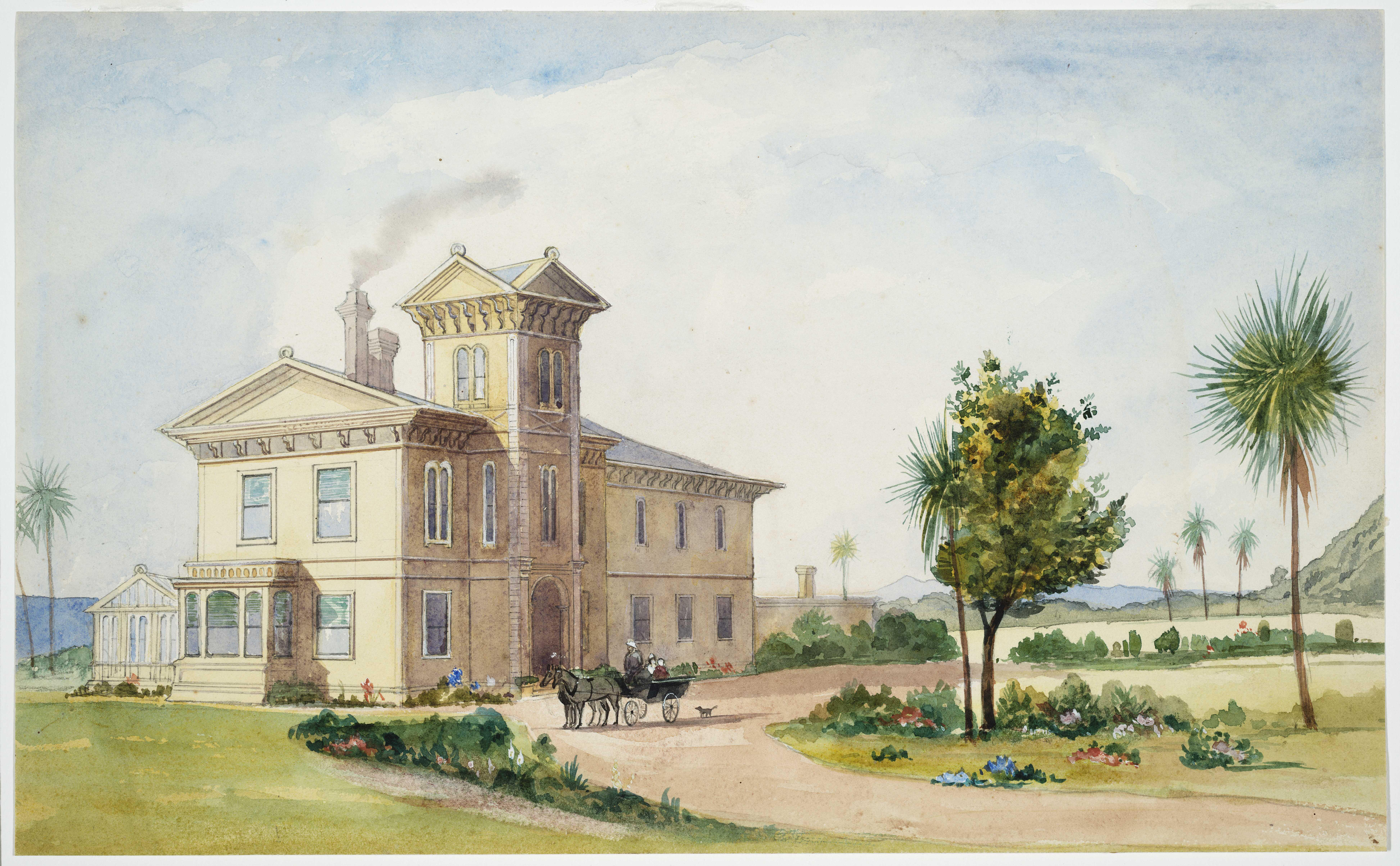
Tringham designed residences for prominent people such as Sir William Fox

In December 1866, Tringham quit his partnership to work as a builder and undertaker. The following year he was advertising as an architect and receiving architectural contracts. Most of Tringham's early contracts were houses, possibly worker's houses given that single tenders were called for multiple houses. In April 1868, Tringham married Margaret Hunter Bennett, Bennett was the daughter of the Registrar General and this marriage may have elevated Tringham's social status and helped with obtaining high profile contracts. Tringham ended up receiving contracts for wealthy and high class citizens such as Sir William Fox and Thomas Coldham Williams. One of the most notable designs of Tringham's was Westoe, a large Italianate residence for William Fox, second premier of New Zealand. Westoe was possibly inspired by Osborne House and has an asymmetrical façade. Tringham worked almost exclusively within Wellington Province, although he did design the Oruawharo Homestead in Takapau. In 1885 Tringham was responsible for planning the New Zealand Industrial Exhibition.

Tringham was one of the main architects in Wellington up to the 1890s. Tringham was responsible for over 340 designs.

== Later life ==
In 1895, Tringham was elected as president of the Wellington Association of Architects. Tringham later retired from architecture and took up sheep farming in the Wairarapa at Pigeon Bush, near Featherston until his death in 1916. Outside of architecture Tringham served as a director for different companies, owned shares in mining corporations, and owned land in Petone.

== List of buildings ==
Name	Date	Image	Note	Ref
Turongo Anglican Church	c.1865			
Manners Street Wesleyan Church	1869		Burnt down in 1879.	
Trinity Wesleyan Methodist Church	1872		Demolished in 1965.	
Johnston House, Fitzherbert Terrace	c.1873		Demolished in the 1930s	
St Patrick's Church, Makara	1873		Registered as a category 2 building with Heritage New Zealand.	
Westoe	1874		Registered as a category 1 building with Heritage New Zealand	
Plimmer House	1874		Registered as a category 1 building with Heritage New Zealand.	
All Saints' Church, Foxton	1876			
St Matthews Church Vicarage, Masterton	1876		Relocated to Greytown	
St Mark's Church, Wellington	1876		Extended in 1888, demolished in 1965.	
St Thomas' Church, Sanson	1877		Registered as a category 2 building with Heritage New Zealand.	
Queen Margaret College Tower	1878		Substantial renovation and extension of an existing building. Registered as a category 2 building with Heritage New Zealand.	
Oruawharo Homestead	1879		Registered as a category 1 building with Heritage New Zealand	
New Zealand Shipping Company Office	1879			
The Pines	c.1875		Unknown architect, possibly Tringham. Registered as a category B building with the Manawatu District Council.	
