= Oruawharo Homestead =

Coordinates: 40.0297°S 176.3859°E

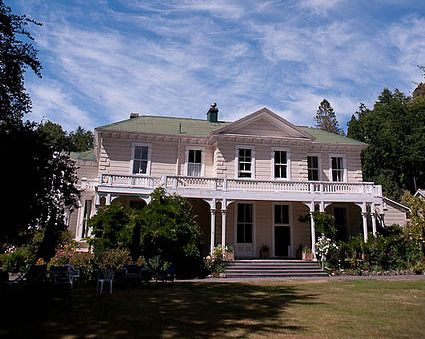
- Oruawharo Homestead

General information
- Type: Homestead
- Architectural style: Italianate
- Location: Oruawharo Station, 379 Oruawhara Road, Takapau, New Zealand
- Completed: 1879
- Affiliation: Johnston family, Sisters of the Presentation

Design and construction
- Architect: Charles Tringham

Website
- oruawharo.com

Heritage New Zealand – Category 1
- Designated: 4 April 1983
- Reference no.: 1048

Oruawharo Homestead is an historic Italianate homestead in the Takapau Plains, New Zealand. It was designed by Charles Tringham for John Johnston, a wealthy upper-class landowner, who wanted a magnificent home on Oruawharo station for his newly-wed son Sydney.

During the First World War the station housed a Territorial Army camp, with officers housed in the homestead. A riot broke out at the camp, although it was swiftly put down. The station remained in family ownership until the death of an heir led to the property being gifted to the Catholic Church, who used it for training nuns and housing the Sisters of the Presentation. The Catholic Church eventually returned the property to the administrators of the estate, who leased it until selling it in 2000. The property was then restored and serves as a function centre and tourist attraction.

The property is registered as a category 1 building with Heritage New Zealand.

== Description ==
The Oruawharo Homestead is a large Italianate building that measures 60 by 70 ft (18 by 21 m). The front Palladian-styled façade has bay windows and a balustrade that holds up a large balcony and is decorated with timber quoins and brackets. The interior has pressed-tin ceilings, ornate plastering, wood panelling, and a carved staircase. The house originally had 21 rooms. An 1899 extension features ornately carved wooden panelling from Bavarian artists. The building contains corded silk and embroided velvet curtains from France.

The homestead's grounds are large and well developed and at one point featured tennis courts, a croquet lawn, a ha-ha, and a rose garden. In addition the grounds have a lot of exotic trees, including a pine planted from a seed of the Gallipoli lone pine. Smaller worker's residence existed on the site but were later demolished. Surviving outer buildings include some farming buildings, the stables, and the coach house.

== History ==
John Johnston was a wealthy upper-class landowner who purchased the Oruawharo run in the 1850s. The name Oruawharo is associated with Ruawharo, the main tohunga of the Tākitimu migratory canoe. The name may have been shortened from Te Maunga o Ruawharo. By the mid-1860s the run had grown to 11,738 acres (4,750 ha). Oruawharo was not farmed by Johnston, who gave grazing rights to other men, until his son Sydney returned from Stonyhurst College, Lancashire, England. In 1861, Sydney moved to the Oruawharo Station and lived in a bark hut until permanent accommodation was constructed. In 12 July 1873, Sydney married Sophia Marianne Lambert, daughter of a station owner. Johnston wanted a magnificent home for his newly-wed son that would evince his family's wealth and status, for this he hired the architect Charles Tringham, who had designed multiple houses for the upper-class in the Wellington Province.

Tenders for the new property at Oruawharo were called for in December 1878. In 1879 construction of the homestead had finished and on 2 October 1879 Sydney and his family moved into the homestead. Mr McLeod of Waipukaurau was the main contractor, with interior plastering done by Mr McGuire of Wellington.

In 1887, Sydney purchased the Oruawharo Station from his deceased father. At the time the station had 17,726 acres (7,173 ha) and 22,000 head of sheep. It had been larger at one point, with land of the station being surveyed off and turned into the Takapau township under Sydney's supervision. Some streets in Takapau are named after Sydney and his family. Oruawharo had several servants and would hold balls for the upper-class. In 1906 Lord Plunket stayed at the homestead whilst the Johnston's were in England. Earl Jellicoe also stayed at the house in 1923.

During the First World War part of the property was used for a Territorial Army Camp. The camp housed up to 6,500 soldiers with the officers living in the homestead alongside the Johnston family. At one point a riot occurred amongst the camp soldiers, although it was swiftly put down by military police. Sydney died on 29 June 1917. Sydney's wife died on 9 October 1931 and the property passed to her daughter Agnes Beatrice. Agnes had married John Christopher Rolleston on 5 July 1922 and the two moved into the homestead in 1933 after Agnes had taken ownership of the homestead and station. In 1951, John Rolleston commissioned renovations of the property, which included the demolition of the rear wing and the creation of an apartment. The Rolleston's son, Christopher Rolleston, was made manager in 1952. A centennial celebration of the station was planned for 1953, but was cancelled following Christopher's death in a tractor accident.

Agnes died in 1965 and her will laid out that the homestead was to be subdivided from the station and given to the Catholic Church. The church used as a Novitiate for nuns and it also housed the Sisters of the Presentation. In 1972, the church auctioned the property as they could not afford to maintain it. The Oruawharo Estate (owned by Caroline Rolleston, Christopher's daughter who had moved to England with her mother following her father's death) obtained the property from the Catholic Church and then leased it to a couple who planned to turn the homestead into a country club. Financial difficulties led to this not occurring. The lease was given to Dennis Hall but he had a dispute with the administrators of the estate and the lease was terminated by the High Court. The property was put onto the market and in 2000 it was sold to Peter and Dianne Harris who restored the property. The homestead is still a residence but is also used commercially, with the ability to be hired for weddings and functions. The homestead receives thousands of visitors annually.
