= Breaker Bay =

Suburb and bay in Wellington, New Zealand

- Suburb
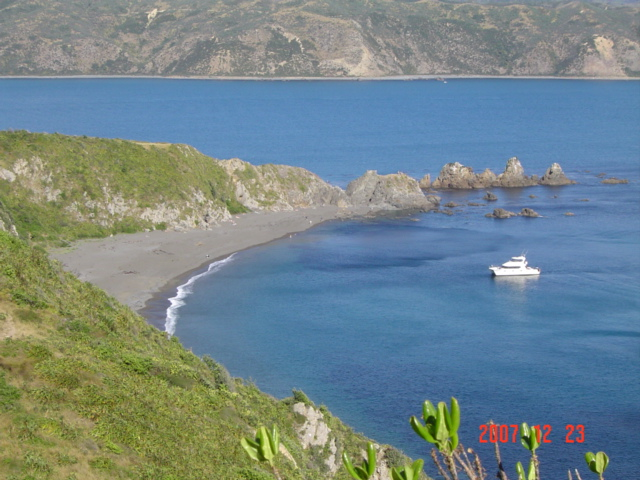
- Breaker Bay, the bay after which the suburb is named, looking east

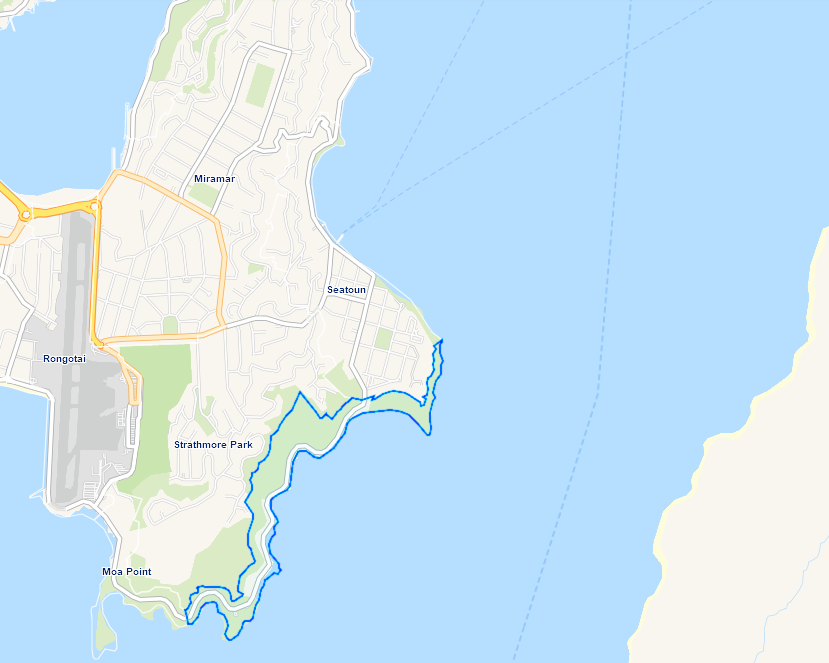
- Breaker Bay, outlined in blue, sits at the Wellington Harbour entrance.
- Coordinates: 41°19′48″S 174°49′56″E
- Country: New Zealand
- City: Wellington City
- Electoral ward: Motukairangi Eastern Ward

Area
  - Land: 58 ha (140 acres)

Population (2023 census)
  - Total: 240
  - Density: 410/km^{2} (1,100/sq mi)

Miramar, New Zealand	Seatoun	(Wellington Harbour)
Strathmore Park	Breaker Bay
Moa Point	(Cook Strait)	(Chaffers Passage)

Breaker Bay is a suburb on the south east coast of Wellington City in New Zealand, on the Miramar Peninsula. The suburb contains a 600 m wide bay with the same name.

== Geography ==
Breaker Bay is a thin strip of land along the southeast coast of Miramar Peninsula. The suburb includes five bays; the largest, Breaker Bay, is at its north, with the other bays going south being Eve Bay, Flax Bay, Reef Bay, and Palmer Bay. It is part of the western shore of the Wellington Harbour entrance.

The suburb of Breaker Bay is named after its largest bay. F. L. Irvine-Smith wrote in 1948, "South from Seatoun is Breaker Bay (by no means a misnomer) reached by the Pass of Branda, named from the well-known pass at the head of Loch Awa [sic]". The Pass of Branda forms the northern entrance to the suburb.

The area is known for southerly gales as it is exposed to Cook Strait. Waves would often crash over the road in winter, and intense storms put pressure on the coastline which is facing erosion. Storms have rendered its only road unusable and damaged, such as in 2013. In 2016, construction started on a new seawall to protect houses and the road and was expected to be finished by April 2017. Another storm in 2021 was declared a state of emergency. Around 140 homes in Breaker Bay were evacuated, the road was closed for around a day, and debris spread across the road needed to be cleared.

The Wahine disaster, a 1968 ferry sinking in which 53 people died, occurred near Breaker Bay. The ferry ended up on Barrett Reef, a feature in the water just off of the bay. Stuart Young, a Breaker Bay resident, was the first to raise the alarm. Some residents attempted to set out in small boats to assist but were forced back by the waves. The Wahine Memorial Park in the suburb commemorates the event; the park is near where survivors reached the shore and includes a bow thruster from the ship.

The Eastern Walkway runs along the top of the bay and has views of the area.

Dolphins and orca are regularly sighted from the suburb. Penguins nest in the area and there are "penguin crossing" signs on the road.

== Facilities and transport ==
Breaker Bay is known for being a clothing optional beach, which is shared by naturists and clothed people alike. New Zealand has no official nude beaches, as public nudity is legal on any beach where it is "known to occur". Families tend to congregate at the end nearest to the road and pass the hole in the rock (to the middle of the beach).

Breaker Bay has only a single road, Breaker Bay Road, which runs close to the coast through the suburb. The suburb is served by a commuter bus (No 30x) running on weekdays to the city in the mornings and to the beach in the afternoons.

There are no public toilets in Breaker Bay. As of 2014, residents were pushing for the council to install toilets, saying that visitors were defecating in bushes, but the council said it had assessed the area and there was not enough demand for toilets there.

== Demographics ==
Breaker Bay has an area of 0.58 km^{2} (0.22 sq mi) It is part of the larger Seatoun statistical area.

Historical population
Year	Pop.	±% p.a.
2006	291	—
2013	282	−0.45%
2018	258	−1.76%
2023	240	−1.44%

Breaker Bay had a population of 240 in the 2023 New Zealand census, a decrease of 18 people (−7.0%) since the 2018 census, and a decrease of 42 people (−14.9%) since the 2013 census. There were 126 males and 114 females in 111 dwellings. 7.5% of people identified as LGBTIQ+. There were 30 people (12.5%) aged under 15 years, 33 (13.8%) aged 15 to 29, 129 (53.8%) aged 30 to 64, and 54 (22.5%) aged 65 or older.

People could identify as more than one ethnicity. The results were 90.0% European (Pākehā); 11.2% Māori; 2.5% Pasifika; 8.8% Asian; and 1.2% Middle Eastern, Latin American and African New Zealanders (MELAA). English was spoken by 98.8%, Māori by 2.5%, and other languages by 10.0%. No language could be spoken by 3.8% (e.g. too young to talk). New Zealand Sign Language was known by 1.2%. The percentage of people born overseas was 27.5, compared with 28.8% nationally.

Religious affiliations were 16.2% Christian, and 1.2% other religions. People who answered that they had no religion were 75.0%, and 6.2% of people did not answer the census question.

Of those at least 15 years old, 114 (54.3%) people had a bachelor's or higher degree, 90 (42.9%) had a post-high school certificate or diploma, and 24 (11.4%) people exclusively held high school qualifications. 66 people (31.4%) earned over $100,000 compared to 12.1% nationally. The employment status of those at least 15 was 114 (54.3%) full-time, 36 (17.1%) part-time, and 3 (1.4%) unemployed.

== Gallery ==
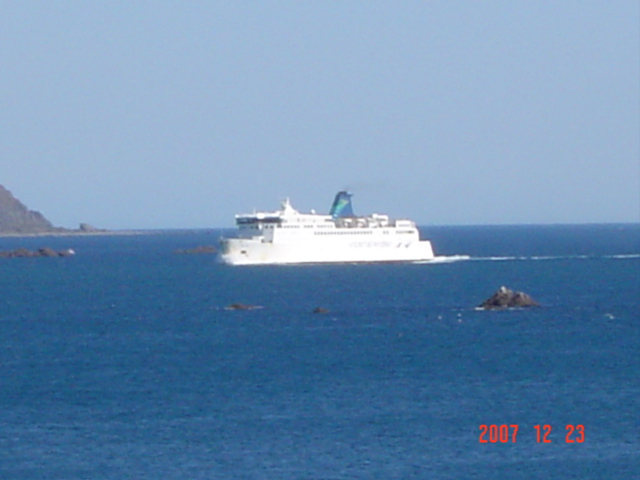
A ferry arriving in Wellington from Picton, seen from Breaker Bay.

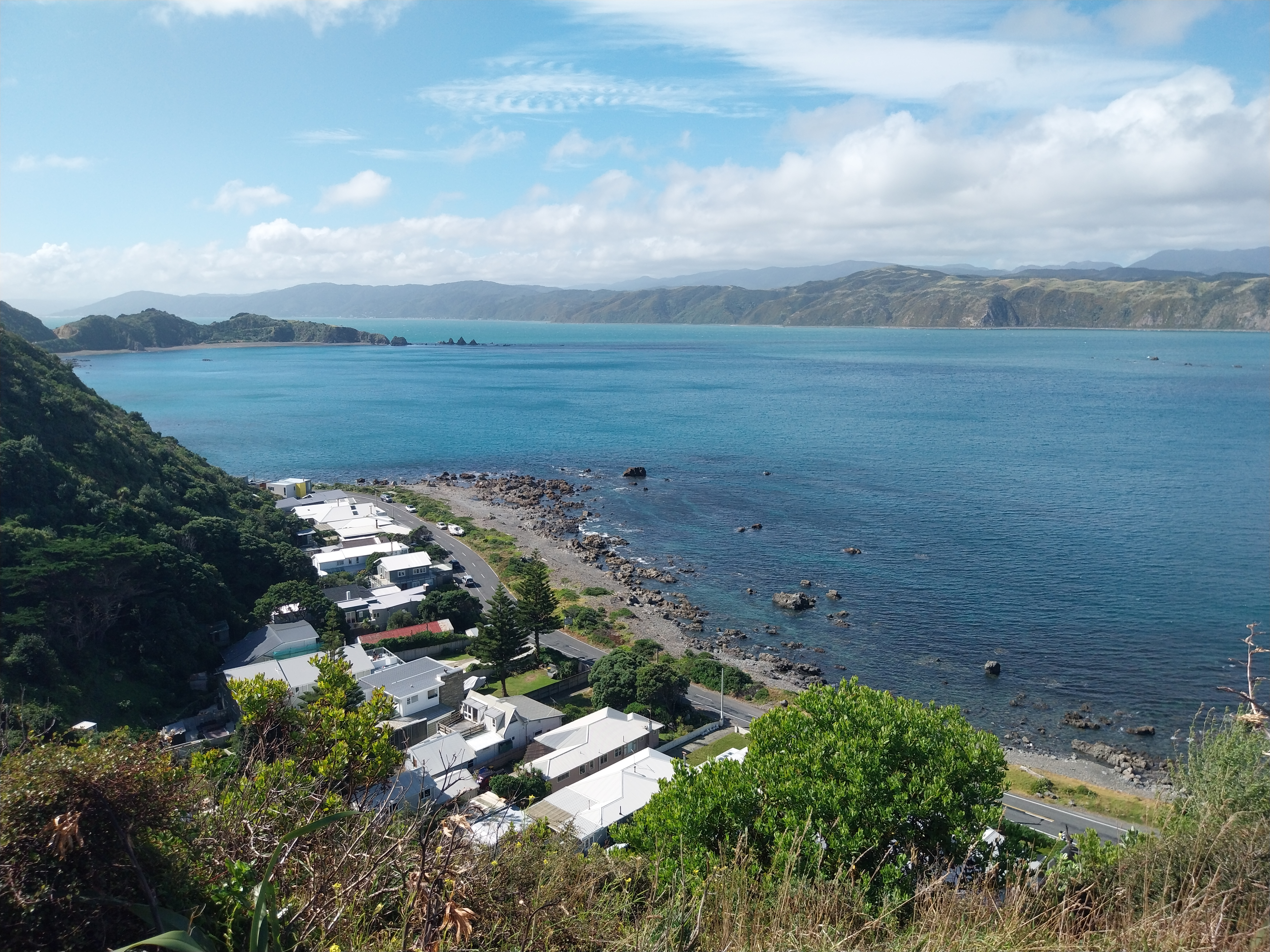
Breaker Bay seen from Ataturk Memorial Park.

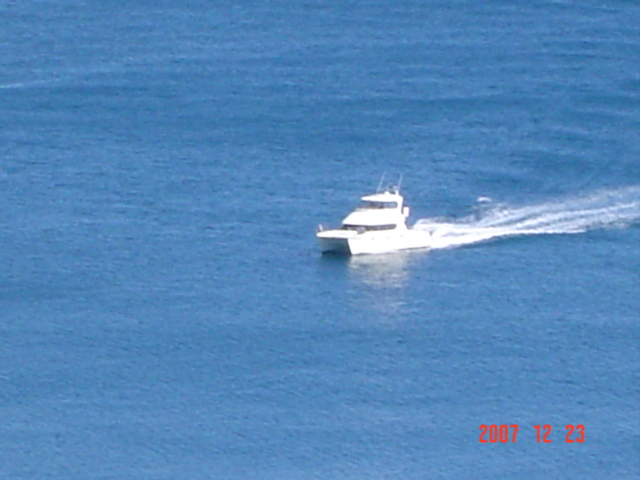

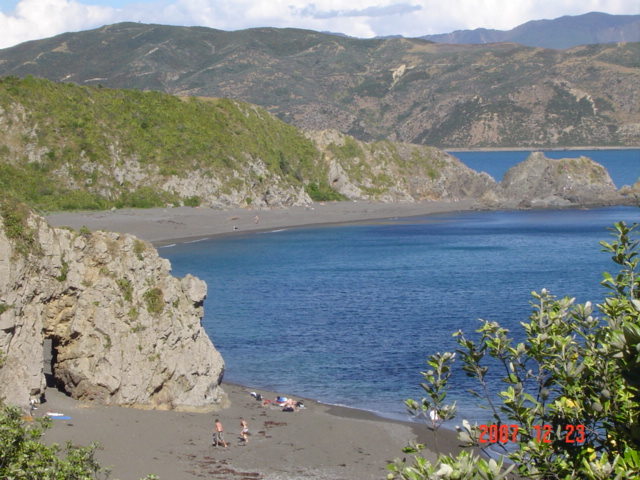

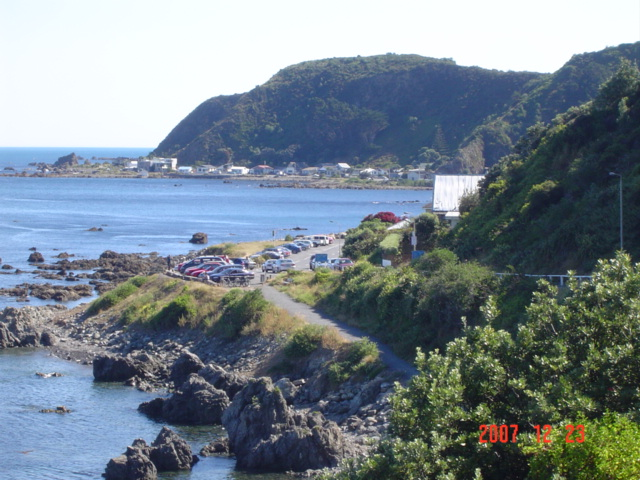

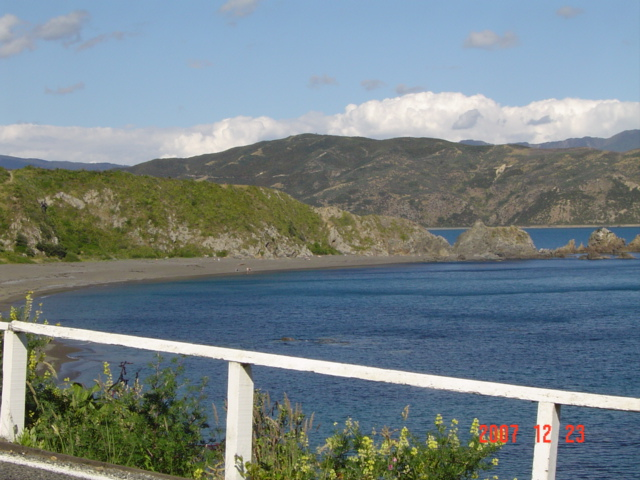

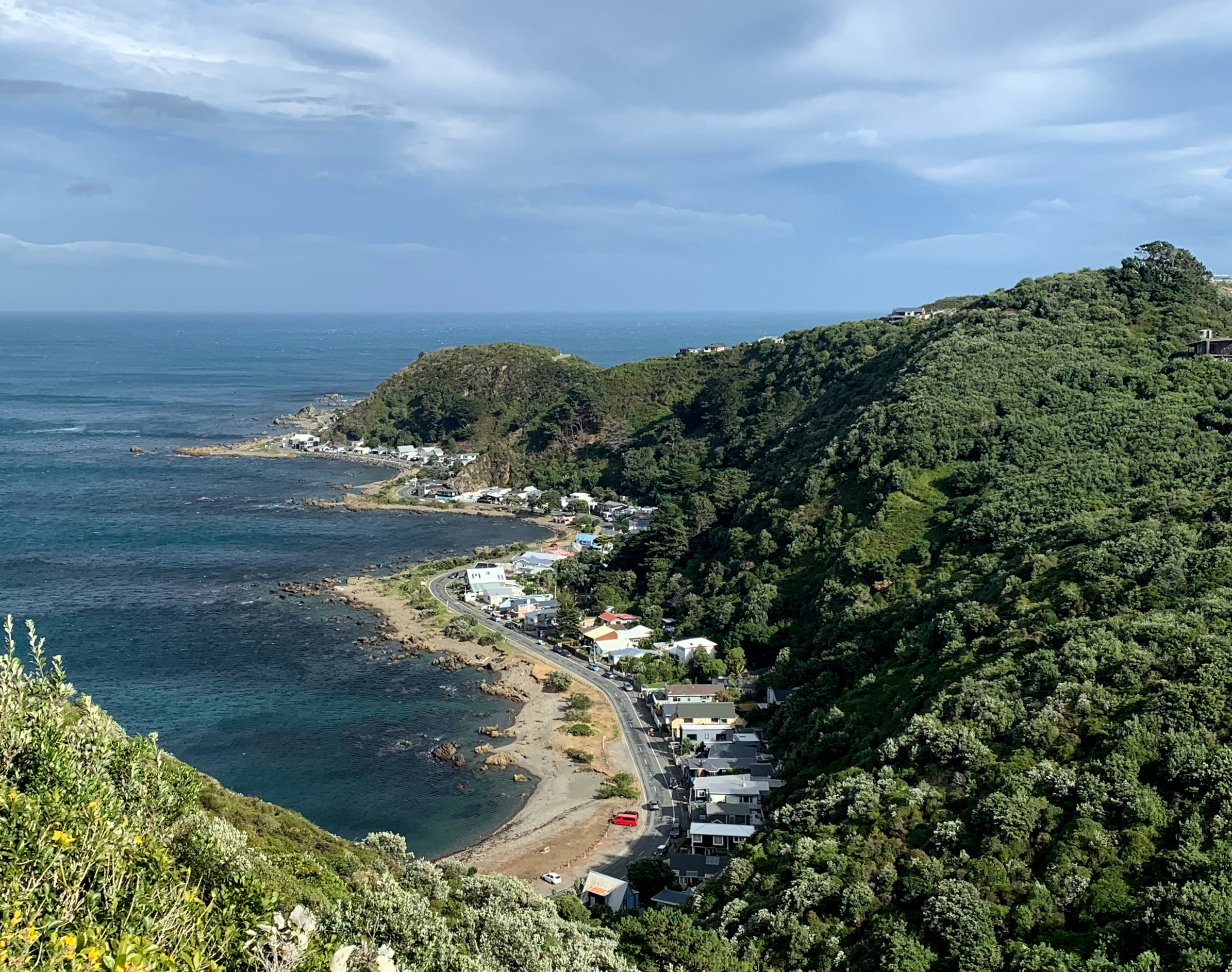

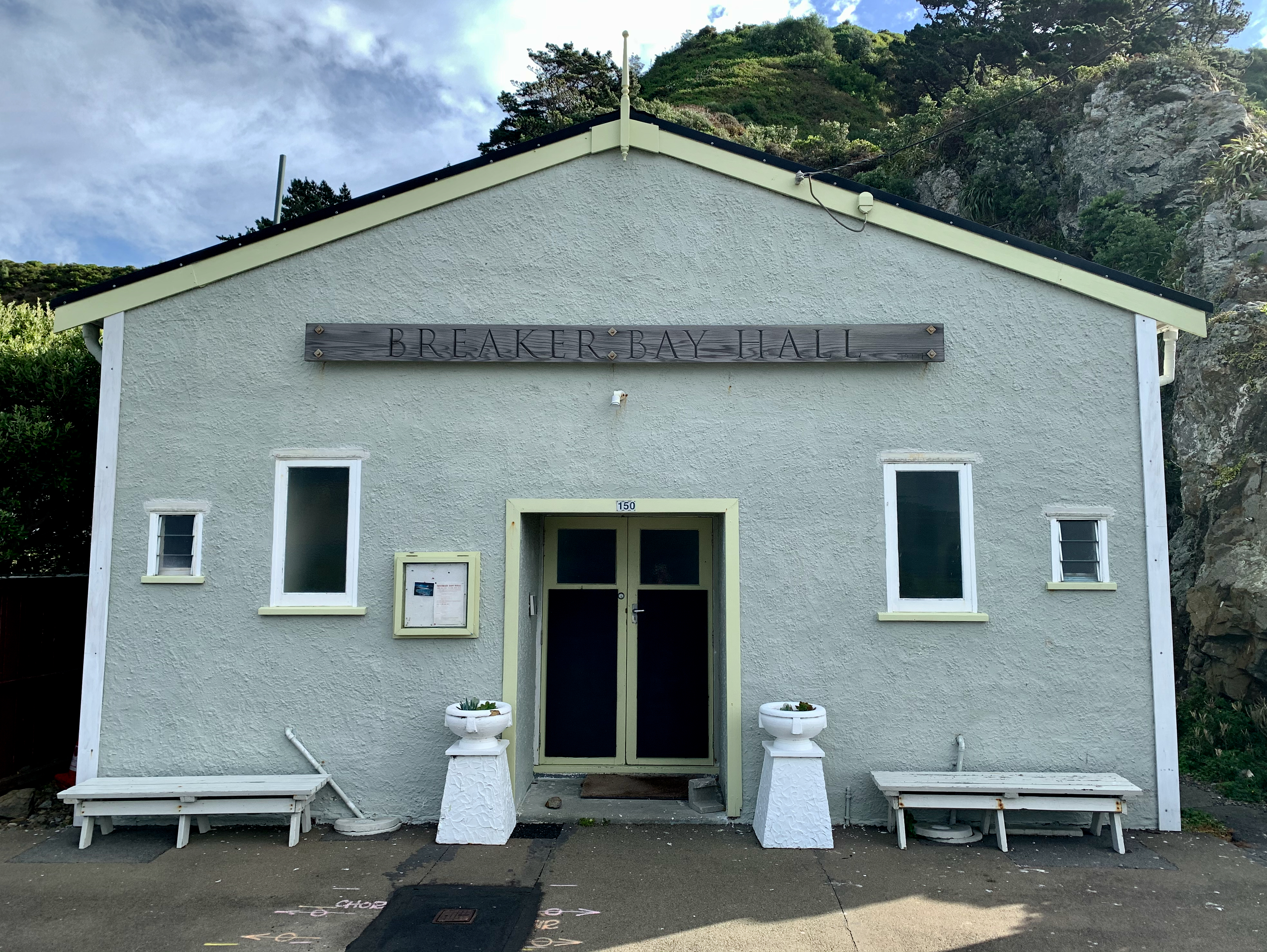
