= Scots College, Wellington =

Scots College
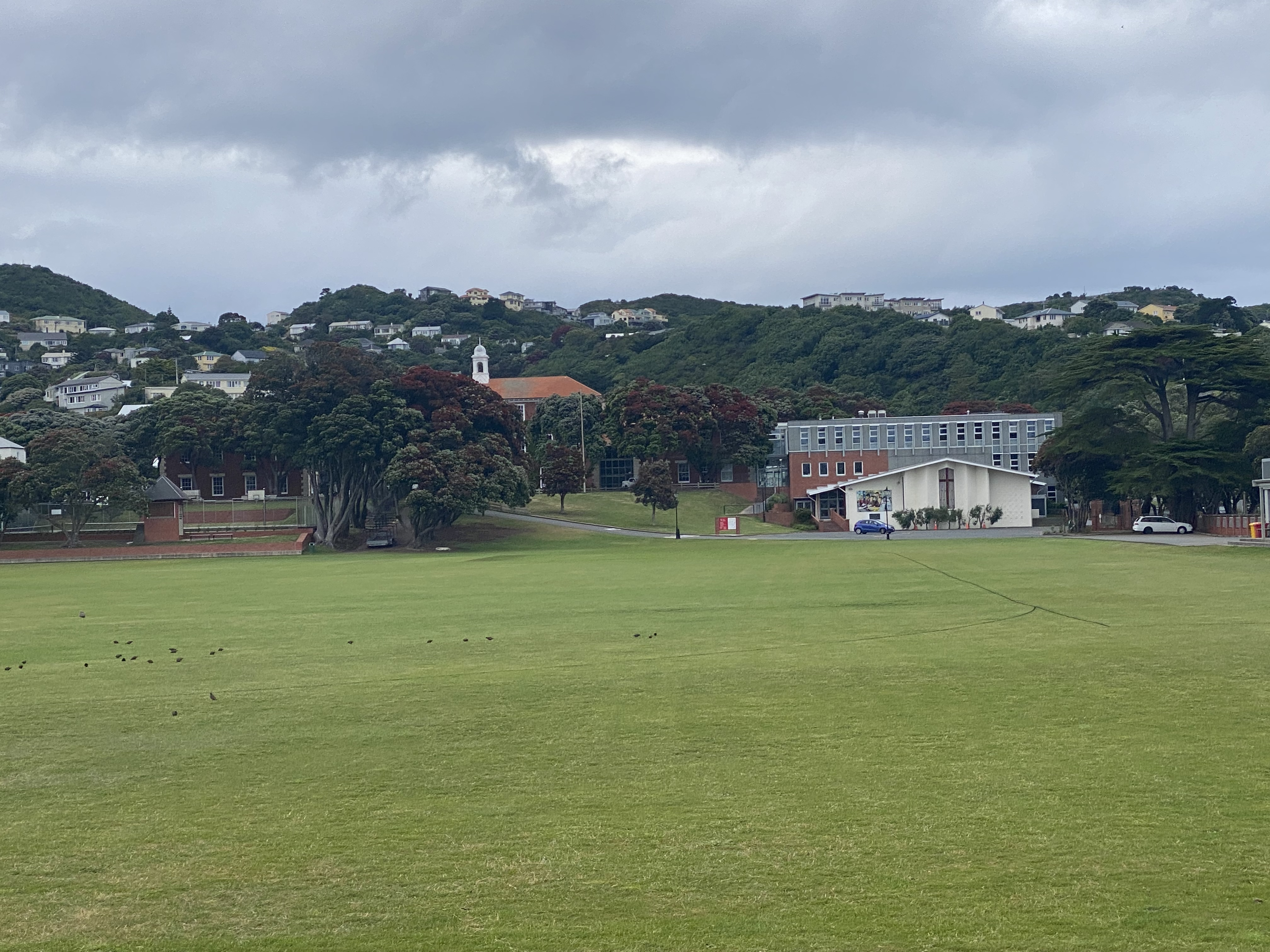
- Scots College in 2022

Location
- Monorgan Road, Strathmore Park, Wellington, New Zealand; 41.3284°S 174.8191°E

Information
- Type: Private, composite, day and boarding
- Motto: Virtutem paret doctrina Let education build all-round character
- Denomination: Presbyterian
- Established: 1916
- Ministry of Education Institution no.: 281
- Headmaster: Mr Graeme Yule
- Grades: 1–13
- Gender: co-educational
- Enrolment: 1,169
- Socio-economic decile: 10
- Website: Scotscollege.school.nz

Scots College is an independent (private) Presbyterian school. It is located in the suburb of Strathmore Park, Wellington, New Zealand. Under the leadership of an Executive Headmaster, the College comprises three schools, the Junior School for Years 1 to 6, the Middle School for Years 7 to 10 and the Senior School for Years 11 to 13. Each school has its own Principal and Staff. Scots College is an IB World College.

== History ==
It was founded as a Presbyterian boys' college in 1916 by Rev Dr James Gibb and the Hon John Aitken on the current campus of Queen Margaret College in Thorndon, and moved to the present site in Strathmore in 1920. Dr Gibb's vision was the creation of a Christian college that would be independent of the secular state system. It is the 'sister' school of Queen Margaret College in Thorndon, Wellington.

The college's Scots heritage is reflected in its ceremonies (often involving a piper leading a procession into its hall) and school song. College prefects wear kilts on official occasions and every Friday for chapel. The school tartan is that of the Clan Fergusson. Permission to wear the tartan was granted by the late Governor General Sir Charles Fergusson.

In 2020, the school began a transition to co-education with girls accepted for years 11 and 12. This was extended to the remaining years in 2021–22.

The Main Block is listed by Heritage New Zealand as a Category 2 historic building.

== Enrolment ==
As a private school, Scots College charges tuition fees to cover costs. For the 2025 school year, tuition fees for New Zealand residents are $21,950 per year for students in years 1 to 6, $27,480 per year for students in years 7 to 10, and $28,630 per year for students in years 11 to 13. Boarding fees are an additional $20,750 per year.

As of July 2026, the school has roll of 1,169 students, of which 91 (7.8%) identify as Māori. As a private school, the school is not assigned an Equity Index.

== Houses ==
Students in the Middle and Senior Schools (Years 7–13) are organised into eight "houses". Each house reflects an important part of the people who have contributed to Scots College over its history. The houses have expanded three times since the founding of the school – two houses were added to the original two in 1961/1963, another two in 1993 with the boarders' house (Gibb) being removed at this time as well, and a further two added in 2009. There are major competitions in swimming, cross-country, music, athletics, and other weekly house sport games, such as hockey and touch rugby. The two original houses were Aitken (Blue, named in honour of founding father Hon John Aitken) and Fergusson (Green, named in honour of General Sir Charles Fergusson), with Glasgow (Red, named in honour of former Headmaster K W R Glasgow) and MacKenzie (Yellow, named in honour of Elsie MacKenzie, Former mistress of the Junios Department of Scots College) being established next, followed by Plimmer (Sky Blue, named in honour of the John Plimmer and his family, whose four grandchildren were enrolled as boarders in 1916) and Uttley (Black, named in honour of Scots College's first Headmaster Dr George Uttley) in 1993 and Smith (Navy Blue, in honour of Alexander Pringle Smith) and Mawson (Maroon, named in honour of Brigadier John Mawson, a past student and Scots College Old Boys' Association President) established in 2009.

The Preparatory School (Years 1–6) maintains four houses: Potatau (Blue), Bedding (Green), Macarthur (Red) and McKelvie (Yellow). In 2004 there was an announcement of a change to the current House names in the hopes of giving the Preparatory School a better sense of historical identity; Potatau named after the writer of the School haka, McKelvie named in honour of past parent and Board of Governors member Lynn McKelvie, Bedding names in honour of past student Geoff Bedding and Macarthur named after the first student at Scots College Ian Hannay Macarthur.

== Campus facilities ==
Recent projects on campus have been the science block, opened in 2006 by Nobel Laureate Sir Paul Nurse and the Aitken (Admin/Reception) block in 2009. Other facilities updated in the last few years include the Leslie Shelly Lecture Theatre and the Information Centre, and an extension to Gibb House, the school's Boarding House. The Hodge Sports Centre (HSC) was opened on 4 November 2011, and the Creative Performing Arts Centre (CPAC) was opened on 2 March 2012.

Opened in 2012 is a purpose built Creative and Performing Arts Centre. The Creative and Performing Arts Centre provides a new Pipe Band facility, recording studio, Drama rooms, Music rooms, Middle School administration area, offices, Art and Graphics rooms.

The College introduced Flexible Learning environments to its campus during 2017 including a tertiary style 'Hub' offering flexible spaces for teaching, student collaboration and a common room for senior students. Additional new Boarding Houses were opened in 2015 and 2018 to house the growing number of boarding students.

Flexible Learning Environments have been introduced to the College over previous years. These spaces help facilitate collaboration and project based learning. They provide teachers and students with areas to learn in large and small groups, collaborate and break away for independent study.

The latest campus development is the McKinnon Block, named in honour of former Headmaster Ian McKinnon and his wife Jenny. Opened in 2020 by Her Excellency the Rt Hon Dame Patsy Reddy Governor General of New Zealand. Included in the building are facilities for Food Science to allow for its introduction to the curriculum. A fabrication lab with state of the art model and design equipment that brings us in alignment with leading NZ universities. The girls’ pastoral care facilities are also located in this block with their own tertiary style common room.

The school also has IB World School status and maintains an IB curriculum from PYP to Diploma. The current IB Diploma co-ordinator is Mike McKnight and the MYP co-ordinator is Kate Bondett.

== Boarding ==
The boarding house (titled Gibb House, after the founder of the school) has accommodation for approximately 130 students. The majority of these students are in Years 9–13, but allowance has been made occasionally for Year 7 and 8 students to board full-time.

== Connections with other schools ==
Scots College 1st XV is currently playing in the Premier I rugby division. In 2014 the 1st XV won the NZ Secondary School Championship – a joint win with Hamilton Boys High School. In 2015 they represented New Zealand at the SANIX Rugby Youth Cup tournament in Japan where they placed third.

Students competing for the 1st XV in traditional fixtures perform a special haka written by an old boy; this is distinct from the school haka.

Scots College is the brother school to the slightly younger Queen Margaret College, which now sites itself in the original Scots College building. Often there are various socials and sporting matches against local schools, organised by College Sport Wellington. In addition, both sections of the school have inter-school fixtures with other secondary schools, notably Lindisfarne and primary schools such as Huntley School.

== Notable alumni ==
- Steven Adams – basketball player for Houston Rockets
- Ashley Bloomfield – Doctor, Director-General of Health and "public face" of 2020 coronavirus pandemic in New Zealand
- Prof Geoffrey Duncan Chisholm – surgeon
- John Clarke – satirist
- Lord Grey of Naunton – last Governor of Northern Ireland
- Eugenio Pizzuto – footballer for Lille OSC
- Stu Riddle – footballer
- Euan Robertson – New Zealand distance runner
- Sarpreet Singh – footballer for Bayern Munich II
- Keegan Smith – footballer for Team Wellington FC
- Oskar van Hattum – footballer for Wellington Phoenix
- Dr Jason Varuhas – Professor of Law at the University of Melbourne
- Victor Vito – New Zealand Rugby Sevens international and All Black
- Alex Paulsen - Goalkeeper for AFC Bournemouth, Wellington Phoenix, and Auckland FC

== Honours ==
=== Sports ===
==== Football ====
CSW Premier Boys Football Champions - 2025

Boys Premier National Tournament - 2025

==== Futsal ====
CSW Premier Boys Futsal Champions - 2025

== Co-educational ==
In August 2020 the Scots College Board of Governors announced the decision to move to a fully co-educational College from 2021. Accepting girls and boys in Years 1-13 (initially excluding Years 8 and 10). This change is part of the College's Future Focussed Learning Strategy and preparing students for their futures in an evolving world.

In January 2018, School Headmaster Graeme Yule announced that Scots College Senior School will become a co-educational school, meaning it will accept both girls and boys to enroll. The change will begin in 2020, when 60 Year 11 to 13 female students will join the Senior School and graduate as the first mixed-sex group from 2021. The integration would expand each year to a total of 150 girls by 2022.
