= James Gibb (Presbyterian minister) =

The Rev. James Gibb (1857–1935) was born in Aberdeen, Scotland on 15 June 1857. He became part of the Presbyterian Church of New Zealand as it was formed (by unification in 1901) and founded several schools in Wellington, New Zealand during the 20th century, including Scots College, Wellington and Queen Margaret College. In 1909 he founded Presbyterian Support Central, a charity which provides support to residents of the southern North Island.

He moved to Dunedin in the 1880s after studying theology at Ormond College in Melbourne. As well as this, Gibb was ordained in 1883. Gibb became a minister of the First Church of Otago in 1886 and lobbied against the annexation of Vanuatu.

In 1903, Gibb became minister of St John's Church, Wellington. During this time he led lobbies against gambling, opium and adultery. In 1910 Gibb objected to the staging of the play The Girl from Rector's by Hugh Ward and the Ward Comedy Players on the grounds of immorality. Ward responded by offering to donate personally and add the proceeds of performances to the fundraising for the new children's ward at Wellington Hospital if other citizens also donated. The conflict between Gibb and Ward continued for several weeks but the outcome was that the public flocked to the play as well as donating. The fundraising effort was so successful that excess funds enabled the purchase of Royal Doulton ceramic picture tiles of nursery rhymes to decorate the children's ward.

After the First World War Gibb became a pacifist and campaigned against war until his resignation from St John's in 1926.

Gibb died in Wellington on 24 October 1935.
