= Jason Varuhas =

Jason Varuhas is a New Zealand academic specializing in administrative law, the law of torts, the law of remedies, and the intersection of public and private law. He is currently Professor of Law at Melbourne Law School. He is also an Associate Fellow of the Centre for Public Law at the University of Cambridge.

== Early life and education ==
Varuhas attended high school at Scots College, Wellington, graduating in 1999. He studied at the Victoria University of Wellington Faculty of Law, graduating in 2004 with an LLB Honours, also completing a BA in Economics that year.

Upon graduation, Varuhas commenced work as a law clerk to Justice O'Regan before returning to faculty as an Assistant Lecturer in 2006. He completed an LLM at University College London on Commonwealth Scholarship in 2008, winning the Derby/Bryce Prize in Law for best results in final examinations across all University of London law schools.

Varuhas completed his PhD at the University of Cambridge. For that thesis he was awarded the Yorke Prize.

== Academic career ==
Before taking up his current appointments, Varuhas was previously a senior lecturer at the University of New South Wales.

== Awards ==
- 2012 Yorke Prize for his doctoral thesis titled: "Damages for Breaches of Human Rights: A Tort-Based Approach".
- 2016 Peter Birks prize for outstanding legal scholarship
- 2018 Inner Temple New Authors Book Prize

== Bibliography ==
- Damages and Human Rights (Hart Publishing, 2016) ISBN 9781849463720
- Varuhas, J. (2020). The Principle of Legality. The Cambridge Law Journal, 79(3), 578-614. doi:10.1017/S0008197320000598

== See also ==
- Principle of Legality (Australia)
