= George Fenwick (editor) =

New Zealand journalist (1847–1929)

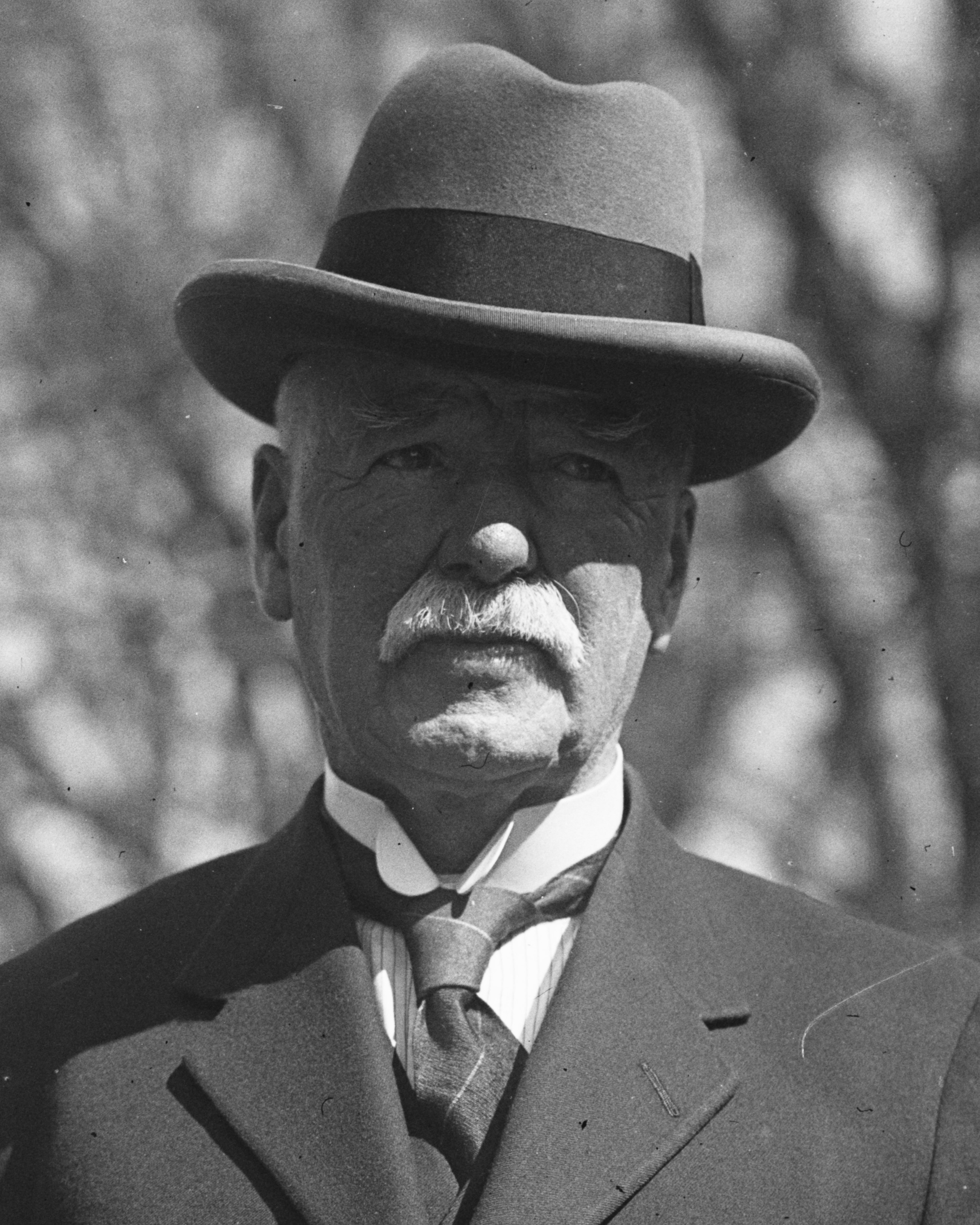
Fenwick in 1924

Sir George Fenwick (2 February 1847 – 23 September 1929) was a New Zealand newspaper proprietor and editor. He is best known for his time as manager and editor of the Otago Daily Times, during which time he supported the campaign initiated by Rutherford Waddell against sweat shops.

== Early life ==
Fenwick was born on 2 February 1847, the second eldest child of Robertine Jane (nee Brown, 1823–1866) and Robert Fenwick (1815–1878) in Sunderland in the north of England. When he was six years old his family responding to the discovery of famous goldfields emigrated to Australia, arriving in Victoria on New Year's Day in 1853.

As the gold fever in Australia subsided, his parents in response to the advertising of W. H. Reynolds, honorary immigration agent for the Provincial Council of Otago of the superior advantages of Otago in New Zealand the couple immigrated with their three children on the schooner Challenger, reaching Dunedin on 23 January 1856. He initially attended the Government school in Lower High Street before attending the Dunedin Academy, a private school in Princes Street which was run by J. G. S. Grant until it closed.

== Otago Witness ==
After his father heard through a friend of an opening at the Otago Witness George was able in 1858 to secure a five-year printing apprenticeship at the newspaper. Because he was still not tall enough to stand at the composing frame, he had to learn the trade by standing on a box beside Daniel Campbell, the manager of the newspaper. The discovery of gold in 1861 at Gabriel's Gully and the resulting gold rush, resulted in a scarcity of adult labour rendered his services all the more valuable. When William Cutten and Julius Vogel, the owners of the Witness started the daily Otago Daily Times in 1861, Fenwick joined the new paper's job-printery.

== Australia ==
Following the completion of his apprenticeship he worked in the office of the newspaper before leaving in 1868 to gain a wider experience of newspapers and the priming trade in Australia. He initially resided in Sydney attracted by the presence in port of his uncle, George Turnbull Brown, who was captain of the Cornwallis, which was involved in the Australian trade. After staying on board his uncle's ship he took up the offer of a position in Townsville, Northern Queensland at the Cleveland Bay Herald and Northern Advertiser. However he found the tropical heat and wildlife not to his liking, which combined with the death of his mother in October 1866 caused him to travel back on the Susannah Booth from Sydney to Dunedin. He had no difficulty in returning to his old position in the Otago Daily Times.

== Lawrence ==
Once back working at the Otago Daily Times Fenwick soon found he was not satisfied with his immediate prospects and so in the following year accepted the offer of James Matthews a former co-worker at the Otago Witness of a partnership in the Tuapeka Press and Goldfields Advocate, which was based in the town of Lawrence. Mathews was also prepared to offer a job to Fenwick's younger brother William, who was still an apprentice.

Fenwick accepted the offer, but the partners soon found of 18 months of struggle that Lawrence was too small for both their newspaper and their better resourced rival, the Tuapeka Times. After opening negotiations they were happy in 1869 to accept £150 from the Tuapeka Times to close down. Fenwick had learnt a valuable lesson – that it was folly to attempt to maintain two newspapers in any community where there was room for only one.

== The Cromwell Argus ==
While the negotiations for the sale of their newspaper proceeded, Matthews and Fenwick had looked for other opportunities and identified that that rising goldfields town of Cromwell did not yet have a newspaper. When Fenwick investigated the town in detail in October 1868, they found that Robert Carrick intended to set up newspaper. When Carrick agreed to drop his venture Matthews and Fenwick decided to proceeded and made a successful canvass for advertisements and subscribers prior only to find on 1 November that Carrick had changed his mind and was also going ahead with his publication. His printing press was in the process of being loaded on a wagon in Dunedin for conveyance to Cromwell.

The partners were already committed to the new venture as Fenwick during his visit had leased land from the Borough Council and had let a contract for the building of a newspaper office on it. Unfortunately they could not immediately relocate to Cromwell as many subscribers of their existing newspaper had paid in advance, and they had advertising contracts which made it essential that two further issues of the Tuapeka Press and Goldfields Advocate had to be published in order to complete a quarterly period. The only way out was to immediately after the printing of the last issue of the Tuapeka Press and Goldfields Advocate was to print off in Lawrence the first issue of The Cromwell Argus and Northern Gold-fields Gazette and then to take the freshly printed newspapers to Cromwell on horseback.

The idea was promptly carried into effect, and on Wednesday, 3 November 1868 after printing off the last edition of the Tuapeka Press and Goldfields Advocate, its masthead was replaced in the press with The Cromwell Argus and Northern Gold-fields Gazette and other necessary alterations were made before the printing commenced. By 6 pm on Saturday 6 November 1869, 500 copies of the new paper had been printed off, and with them strapped in front of the saddle Fenwick set off on a ride of over 80 miles (130 km) from Lawrence to Cromwell. After a 30 miles (48 km) ride he reached Miller's Flat, crossing the Clutha River by the punt that night and rested for three to four hours at the station of Walter Miller. At dawn he recommenced his journey and reached Cromwell at 9 pm on Sunday, where he presented the mayor and one or two prominent residents with copies of the newspaper. The following morning Fenwick delivered copies to every house. in the town, before hiring a fresh horse to deliver copies over a large part of the surrounding district. As they explained in their first edition, it did thus not contain any local Cromwell news.

By the time Matthews arrived in Cromwell in a wagon with the printing equipment and their household belongings the office was almost ready for occupation. Their rival the Cromwell Guardian soon commenced publication, but after six months it ceased publication.

== Takeover of the Otago Daily Times ==
Fenwick soon found that the narrowness of life in Cromwell and the absence of opportunities were not congenial to his temperament, which lead him in 1871, to sell his part-ownership in the newspaper to his brother William and move to Dunedin. He eventually joined John Mackay (who subsequently became Government printer) as partner in a general printing business based in Princes Street.

In 1875 he took up the position of manager of the Otago Guardian, which was performing poorly. Soon recognising that it was impossible to stem the heavy losses that the newspaper was incurring Fenwick recommended to the directors of the company that they sell both it and the company's weekly paper, the Southern Mercury. Taking his advice, the publications were soon after sold to George McCullagh Reed, who had previously been in partnership with Henry Brett in the Auckland Star.

When deciding to purchase the publications Reed believed that he could redeem the newspaper's fortunes by the sheer force and power of his writing and editing. Against his better judgment, Fenwick was influenced by Reed's conviction, and stayed on in his position and also became a partner. The business however continued to deteriorate and it took little more than a year's experience for Reed by 1877 to come to share Fenwick's view that Dunedin was not able to support two morning newspapers, theirs and the much larger and more prosperous Otago Daily Times. Fenwick had a brainstorm and staggered Reed when he proposed that they should endeavor to purchase via a reverse takeover the company that owned the Otago Daily Times and Otago Witness. Thus by amalgamating their publications with their older-established more successful rivals, they could transform the two concerns into a lucrative business. The directors of their rivals were adamantly opposed and it was necessary for Fenwick and Reed by using W. H. Reynolds as secret negotiator and by raising an offer of £30,000 before they gained control. As soon as Reed and Fenwick assumed control of the Otago Daily Times and Otago Witness, the Otago Guardian and the Southern Mercury ceased publication.

Fenwick subsequently became managing director when the business was floated as a public company a year later. Reed edited the Otago Daily Times before departing in 1878 to become New Zealand's immigration agent in Ireland.

== Campaign against sweating ==
In October 1888, Presbyterian minister Rutherford Waddell gave a sermon in Dunedin "On the sin of cheapness", against sweat-shop labour in the clothing industry which stirred many of the local community into action. The cause was taken up by Fenwick in a series of articles published in January 1889 which had been written by the newspaper's chief reporter Silas Spragg (1852–1935), who was married to his younger sister Alice Robertine Fenwick. In response to the campaign a royal commission on sweating was established in 1890. Its conclusions and recommendations formed the basis of many of the country's social reforms of the following decade. He also used his time as editor to support funding of the University of Otago, a women's hospital ward, the expansion of the University of Otago Medical School, and the Hocken Library.

== Press association ==
In 1878 Fenwick helped found the New Zealand Press Association in competition to the existing New Zealand Press Agency. After the two groups merged in 1879 Fenwick became a member of the committee of the resulting United Press Association.

When Richard Twopeny resigned from the editorship of the Otago Daily Times in 1890 after a disagreement with the directors, Fenwick also took on the editorship duties.

In 1894, as editor, he attacked conditions in Dunedin's slaughter-houses, which resulted in a poll in April 1895 which approved the establishment of public abattoirs.

In 1909 Fenwick handed the editorship of the newspaper to James Hutchison. While William Easton succeeded him as manager in 1919, Fenwick remained managing director of the Otago Daily Times until his death.

== Other activities ==
Fenwick was the founding president of the Newspaper Proprietors' Association, and was also prominent in the industry's professional organisations. He also served as chairman of the New Zealand branch of the Empire Press Union.

He was an office-holder in many welfare and cultural organisations, including St Mary's Orphanage, the Prisons Board, YMCA, Dunedin Public Art Gallery, New Zealand Nurses' Memorial Fund, Hocken Library, Otago Expansion League, Shipwreck Belief Society, Patriotic and General Welfare Association and the Patients' and Prisoners' Aid Society. To counter cruelty to horses in 1882 he led the founding of the Otago branch of the Society for the Prevention of Cruelty to Animals (SPCA).

He was a founder member of the Dunedin and Suburban Reserves Conservation Society, which was established on 15 October 1888. He was the founding president of the Dunedin Rotary Club.

He also served as a director on numerous companies including Perpetual Trustees Estate, and Agency Company of New Zealand; Standard Insurance Company of New Zealand, United Press Association of New Zealand, and of the Lyttelton Times Company.

His commercial interests led to him serving in 1916–1917 as president of the Dunedin Chamber of Commerce. In 1909 Fenwick was chairman of the New Zealand delegation to the Imperial Press Conference being held in England. In 1918 he was chairman of the New Zealand press delegation that visited the United Kingdom and France.

Other than once heading a licensing committee pool Fenwick refused despite being asked on several occasions to accept nominations as a representative in either local or national politics.

He compiled the historical chronicle issued for the Dunedin City Council jubilee in 1915.

Fenwick was an ardent tramper, making many excursions into the remote regions of Otago and the West Coast. He recorded his enthusiasm for tramping, natural history and travel in a number of books and pamphlets.

== Death ==
Fenwick died at his home at Napier Street, Mornington, Dunedin on 23 September 1929 following a short illness. He was survived by his wife Lady Jane Fenwick and six of their children.

Following his funeral service in St Paul's Cathedral on 24 September he was buried in the Southern Cemetery, in Dunedin.

== Honours ==
Fenwick was appointed a Knight Bachelor in the 1919 King's Birthday Honours for public services, and invested by the Prince of Wales in 1920 during his visit to Dunedin. Fenwick was inducted into the New Zealand Business Hall of Fame in July 2008.

== Personal life ==
Fenwick married Jane Atlantic Proudfoot at Dunedin in 1874. Jane had been born to Marion (nee Jack) and George Proudfoot on the board the Strathfieldsaye, while it was en route to Melbourne in 1851. Following the death of her father she and her mother followed her brother David Proudfoot to Dunedin. Jane died on 21 December 1938 at the age of 86, nine years after her husband.

The couple had eight children: Lilian May Fenwick (1880–1957), Linda Constance Fenwick (1876–1962), George Earnest Oswald Fenwick (1878–1955), Florence Eveline Fenwick (1879–1914), Ruby Beatrice Fenwick (1884–1968), Marion Robertine Fenwick (1875–1952), David Eardley Fenwick (1887–1934) and Stanley Arthur Fenwick (1886–1891). Jane and George's son David Eardley Fenwick served in the R.A.M.C. and N.Z.M.C. in World War I, rising to the rank of Lieutenant-Colonel, and for a period was the officer commanding the Queen Mary Hospital for Nervous Diseases. He also served as a member of the Royal Commission on Tuberculosis in New Zealand in 1928.

Businessman and environmentalist Rob Fenwick was his great-grandson.
