= Strathmore Park =

Suburb of Wellington City, New Zealand

- Suburb
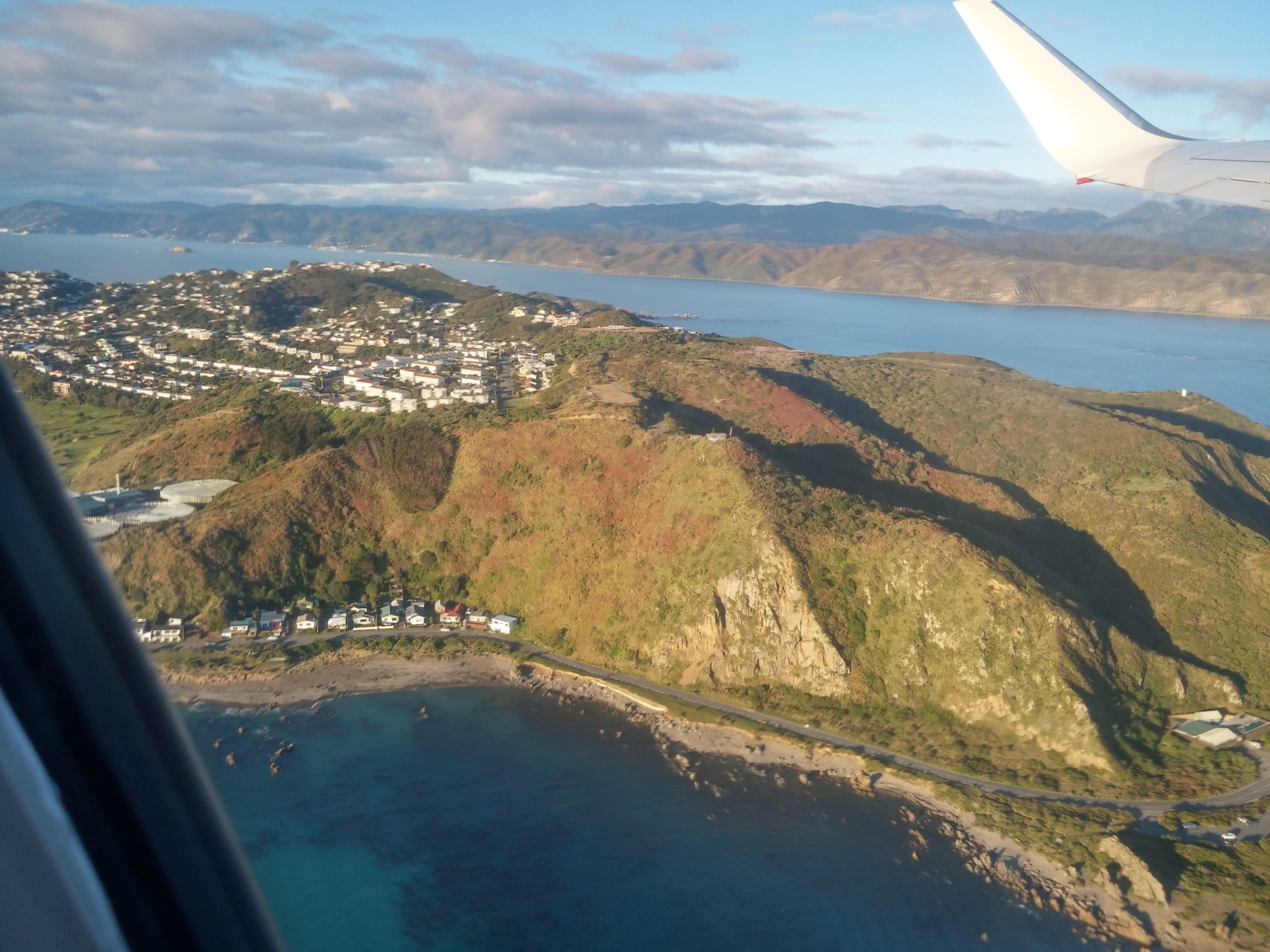
- Interactive map of Strathmore Park
- Coordinates: 41°20′00″S 174°49′12″E
- Country: New Zealand
- City: Wellington City
- Local authority: Wellington City Council
- Electoral ward: Motukairangi/Eastern Ward; Te Whanganui-a-Tara Māori Ward

Area
  - Land: 146 ha (360 acres)

Population (June 2025)
  - Total: 3,850
  - Density: 2,640/km^{2} (6,830/sq mi)

	Miramar
Rongotai	Strathmore Park	Breaker Bay
	Cook Strait

Strathmore Park is a suburb of Wellington City, New Zealand. It is located at the southern end of the Miramar Peninsula to the south of the suburb of Miramar, and due east of the airport. A hill suburb, it overlooks Lyall Bay (which lies to the west), Evans Bay (to the North) and several bays along the Seatoun coast close to the mouth of Wellington Harbour, which lies to the east.

Strathmore Park is noted for several areas of open land, including the Beacon Hill Reserve and Miramar Golf Course. The southern end of the suburb is dominated by Atatürk Park, which is located high above Tarakena Bay. The site was chosen for its similarity to the landscape of Gallipoli, and was erected as part of a joint agreement with the Turkish and Australian governments in mutual respect of the men of both sides who lost their lives in the Gallipoli Campaign of World War I. The memorial was designed by Ian Bowman and unveiled in 1990.

== History ==
Strathmore Park grew after the private secondary school Scots College opened in 1919. From the 1930s it was the site of a state housing development. Many of the original state houses remain, particularly in Taiaroa Street and Raukawa Street. In the 1960s three state-housing apartment blocks known as Star Flats were built in Strathmore Park.

== Demographics ==
Strathmore statistical area covers 1.46 km^{2} (0.56 sq mi). It had an estimated population of 3,850 as of June 2025, with a population density of 2,637 people per km^{2}.

Historical population
Year	Pop.	±% p.a.
2006	3,768	—
2013	3,702	−0.25%
2018	3,828	+0.67%
2023	3,744	−0.44%

Strathmore had a population of 3,744 in the 2023 New Zealand census, a decrease of 84 people (−2.2%) since the 2018 census, and an increase of 42 people (1.1%) since the 2013 census. There were 1,866 males, 1,845 females, and 30 people of other genders in 1,299 dwellings. 4.8% of people identified as LGBTIQ+. The median age was 37.9 years (compared with 38.1 years nationally). There were 738 people (19.7%) aged under 15 years, 744 (19.9%) aged 15 to 29, 1,830 (48.9%) aged 30 to 64, and 429 (11.5%) aged 65 or older.

People could identify as more than one ethnicity. The results were 59.4% European (Pākehā); 17.5% Māori; 18.3% Pasifika; 12.7% Asian; 8.5% Middle Eastern, Latin American and African New Zealanders (MELAA); and 1.1% other, which includes people giving their ethnicity as "New Zealander". English was spoken by 94.2%, Māori by 4.4%, Samoan by 7.6%, and other languages by 21.8%. No language could be spoken by 2.0% (e.g. too young to talk). New Zealand Sign Language was known by 0.5%. The percentage of people born overseas was 31.6, compared with 28.8% nationally.

Religious affiliations were 38.9% Christian, 2.8% Hindu, 4.2% Islam, 1.2% Māori religious beliefs, 1.4% Buddhist, 0.4% New Age, 0.2% Jewish, and 1.2% other religions. People who answered that they had no religion were 44.2%, and 6.0% of people did not answer the census question.

Of those at least 15 years old, 951 (31.6%) people had a bachelor's or higher degree, 1,278 (42.5%) had a post-high school certificate or diploma, and 774 (25.7%) people exclusively held high school qualifications. The median income was $43,800, compared with $41,500 nationally. 558 people (18.6%) earned over $100,000 compared to 12.1% nationally. The employment status of those at least 15 was 1,578 (52.5%) full-time, 444 (14.8%) part-time, and 99 (3.3%) unemployed.

== Education ==
Kahurangi School is a co-educational state primary school for Year 1 to 8 students, with a roll of 263 as of July 2026. It opened in 2013, when Strathmore Community School (established in 1947 as Strathmore Park School and renamed in 2004) and Miramar South School (established 1922) merged.

Scots College is a private Presbyterian school for Year 1 to 13 students founded in 1916, with a roll of 1,169. Though primarily a day school, it hosts a small boarding house. Scots College became a co-educational school in 2021, having previously only admitted boys.
