= Queen Margaret College, Wellington =

Coordinates: 41.2723°S 174.7800°E

Queen Margaret College
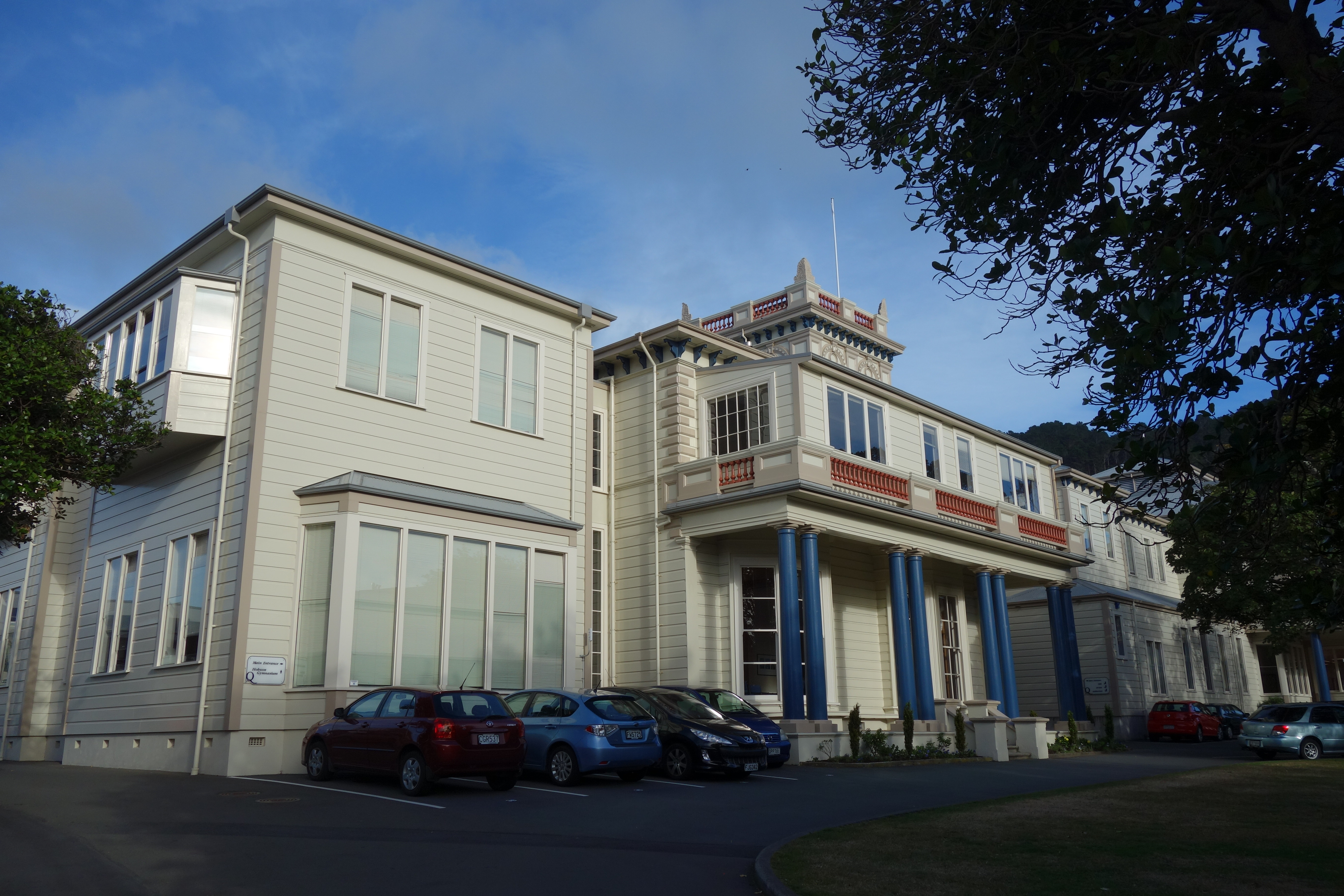
- The Queen Margaret College Tower Building

Location
- 53 Hobson Street; Thorndon; Wellington; New Zealand

Information
- Funding type: Private
- Motto: Latin: Luce Veritatis (Light of Truth)
- Established: 1919
- Founders: John Aitken and Dr James Gibb
- Ministry of Education Institution no.: 278
- Principal: Ms Jayne-Ann Young
- Years offered: Preschool – Year 13
- Gender: Girls
- Enrolment: 761
- Student to teacher ratio: 1:20
- Socio-economic decile: 10
- Website: qmc.school.nz

Queen Margaret College is an independent girls’ school in Wellington, New Zealand, providing education for students from Year 1 to 13 with a co-educational Pre-School. It was established in 1919 as an inner-city, Presbyterian girls’ college.

== History ==
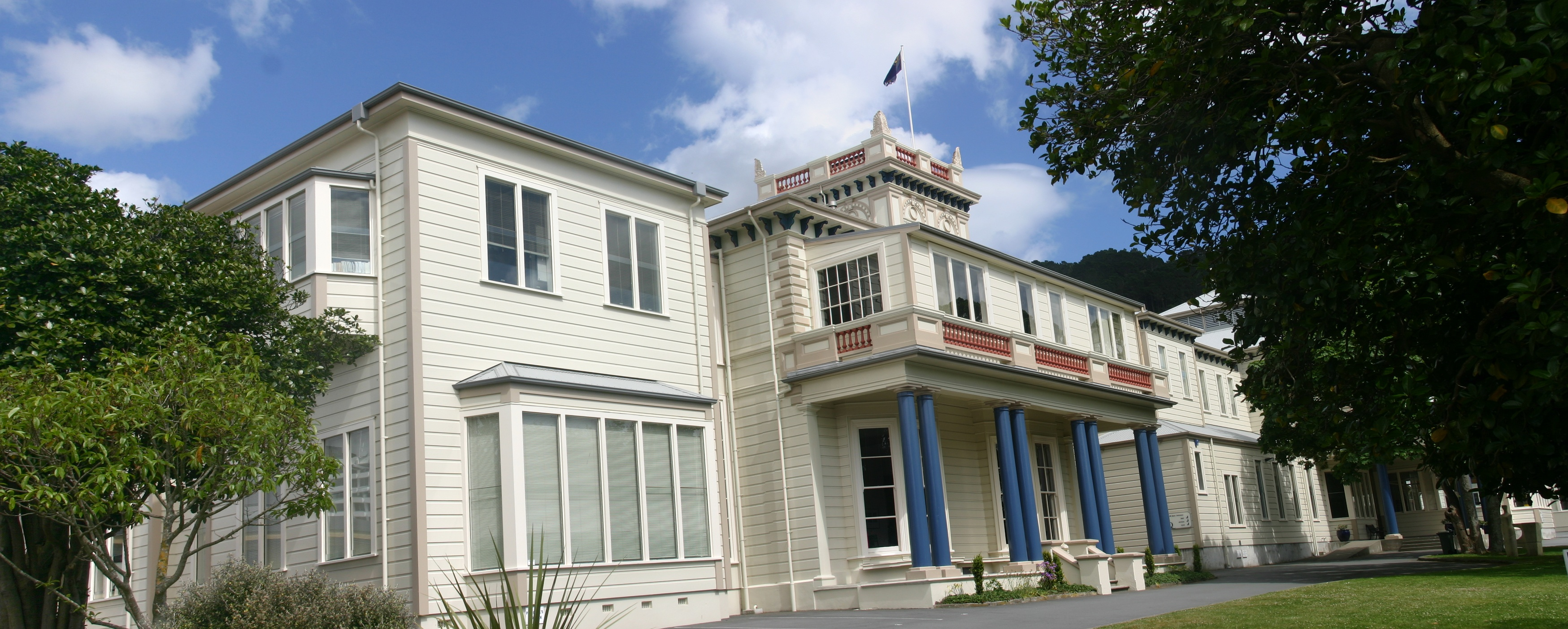
Queen Margaret College

The site of the college was originally a private residence for Thomas Coldham Williams. The residence was an Italianate building, which was designed by Charles Tringham. Williams died in 1912 and in 1915, the Presbyterian Church took the lease of the property and founded Scots College. In 1919 the college moved to a larger site in Strathmore and Queen Margaret College was established on the site. This original building is known as Queen Margaret College Tower and is registered as a category 2 building with Heritage New Zealand.

The School's namesake is Queen Margaret, who was married to King Malcolm. He features in Macbeth, being one of Duncan's sons, who flees after his father was murdered.

Students are organised into five houses – Berwick (blue & silver), Braemar (blue & yellow), Glamis (red & blue), Lochleven (red, green and black), and Stirling (black & yellow). They are named after castles in Scotland, a nod towards the Scottish heritage upon which the school was built.

Queen Margaret College has links with the international body of Margaret Schools and Independent Schools of New Zealand.

== Enrolment ==
As a private school, Queen Margaret College charges tuition fees to cover costs. For the 2025 school year, tuition fees for New Zealand residents are $21,230 per year for students in years 1 to 6, $26,660 per year for students in years 7 and 8, $27,300 per year for students in years 9 and 10 and $28,000 per year for students in years 11 and above.

As of July 2026, Queen Margaret College has roll of 761 students, of which 49 (6.4%) identify as Māori. As a private school, the school is not assigned an Equity Index.

== Curriculum ==
Queen Margaret College offers the International Baccalaureate. The school is the largest, independent girls’ school in Wellington and the only girls’ school in the lower North Island offering a dual qualification pathway of either the internationally recognised IB Diploma or New Zealand's credential, The National Certificate of Education (NCEA).

== Extra-curricular ==
The students have numerous opportunities for involvement, high-level performance and leadership through sporting and cultural activities and extensive exchange programmes with sister schools. The college has over 100 sports teams participating in a wide range of sports. There are options for social and competitive levels. Students can join a number of musical groups and participate in the Sheilah Winn Shakespeare Festival, debating, theatre-sports and the annual joint musical production with Scots College. Queen Margaret College also has an extensive exchange programme with sister schools from Chile, Tahiti, France, Australia, China, Europe, US and Japan encouraging language development and global citizenship.

== Facilities ==
The Tower Block is located at the centre of the school learning environment. The Hobson Complex was opened in 2013 which includes a purpose-built gym and fitness room. The school also has an auditorium for music and performances. A new purpose-built co-educational pre-school was opened in 2015. In 2018, the Queen Margaret boarding house was established, capable of housing 40 students.

== Notable alumnae ==
- Hilary Barry – journalist and television personality
- Kirsty Gunn – novelist and writer of short stories
- Stella Maxwell – fashion model
- Antonia Prebble – 1999–2001, actress
- Helen Small – 1970–1982, English Literature professor at Oxford University
- Shirley Smith – lawyer
- Hayley Sproull – comedian, television presenter, radio host and Lochiel marcher
- Ruby Tew – 2008–2011, Olympic rower
- Rae Weston (1941–2014), professor of banking, and first woman professor at Massey University

== Community ==
Queen Margaret College's community includes a very active Old Girls' Association & Alumni Office, Foundation Trust and Parents' Association, alongside a Community Business Directory.
