= Aytes =

Aytes is a surname. Notable people with the surname include:

- Michael Aytes, Director of Homeland Security Programs at US Investigation Services
- Rochelle Aytes (born 1976), American actress and model

== See also ==
- Ayles
- Ayten (disambiguation)
