= 1879 Octagon fire =

Fire in Dunedin, New Zealand

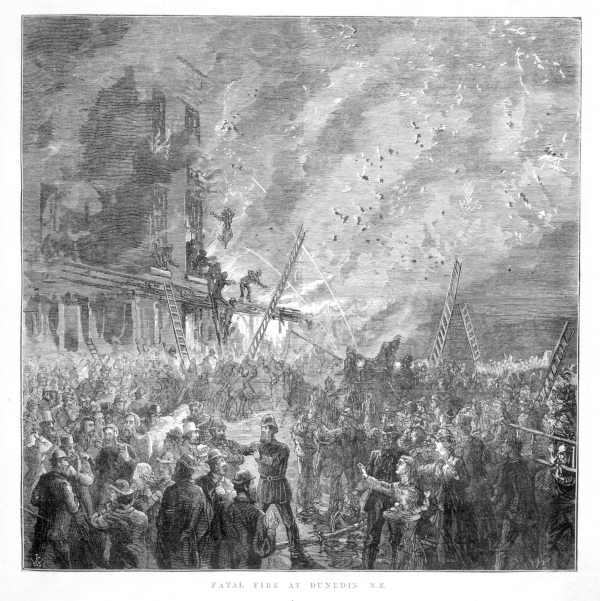
- An illustration, credited to Samuel Calvert (1828–1913) and James Waltham Curtis (1839–1901), of the Cafe Chantant fire.
- Date: 8 September 1879
- Time: 2:30am (approximate)
- Venue: Cafe Chantant
- Location: Cafe Chantant in The Octagon, Ōtepoti Dunedin
- Type: arson
- Motive: insurance fraud
- Perpetrator: William Waters
- Participants: Survivors John Jenkinson (later a member of the New Zealand Legislative Council) and Peter Grant returned to the building after escaping to help get others out
- Casualties: Robert Wilson, editor of the Otago Witness; George A. Martin, a librarian at Athenaeum Library
- Deaths: 12
- Property damage: Impacted the Cafe which was in the surrounding four-storey Octagon Buildings known as Ross's Buildings
- Displaced: 30-50 lodgers from the upper rooms as well as other patrons and owners
- Inquest: held later in September 1879
- Coroner: City Coroner, Dr. Thomas Hocken
- Arrests: William Waters
- Suspects: William Waters (theatre and cafe owner)
- Accused: William Waters
- Charges: arson, murder of Robert Wilson
- Verdict: Not guilty

The 1879 Octagon fire was a deadly blaze in The Octagon, the city centre of the New Zealand city of Dunedin. With 12 fatalities, it was the biggest loss of life in New Zealand due to a single fire until the Seacliff Hospital fire 63 years later, and remains Dunedin city's deadliest fire.

== The fire ==
On 8 September 1879, at around half past two in the morning, a fire broke out in Cafe Chantant in the lower southeast quadrant of The Octagon. The cafe was part of the four-storey Octagon Buildings, built in 1876 and commonly known as Ross's Buildings, which contained shops on the ground floor and rented offices and accommodation on the upper floors. These rooms were largely occupied when the fire started. The building was so called for architect David Ross, who owned it and had his offices on the ground floor, behind Cafe Chantant. Luckily for Ross, he was overseas when the fire occurred.

Twelve people died in the fire, including Robert Wilson, editor of the Otago Witness newspaper, his wife, and four of their seven children. Wilson had stated on several occasions that the building was a death trap and a fire could result in the loss of life. Others killed included George A. Martin, a librarian at the nearby Athenaeum Library.

Ross's Buildings were roughly L-shaped, with a long frontage on The Octagon, and contained Cafe Chantant, a milliner's run by Wilson's wife, Sarah Anne, and a theatre on the ground floor. Both the theatre and cafe were owned by William Waters. The upper floors' rooms were occupied by at least 30, and possibly as many as 50, lodgers at the time of the fire. The building—and especially the cafe—had a reputation for being less than savoury; police had frequently been called to the cafe, and had threatened proceedings against Waters.

Access to the upper floors was poor, and when the fire broke out, the only means of reaching them was up a stairway near the heart of the fire. Several patrons attempted to escape—some of them successfully—by jumping from upper storeys. Rescue was further hampered by delays in arrival by the local fire brigade, which had only just moved into a new station and was in need of more horses.

Among the survivors of the blaze was John Jenkinson, who would later become a member of the New Zealand Legislative Council. Jenkinson shared rooms on the third floor. After escaping via the staircase, he and his roommate, Peter Grant, returned to the building and helped several people from the flames.

The fire was the third major disaster to hit the Otago region within a year, following close on the heels of the 1879 Kaitangata Mine disaster and the 1878 Clutha flood.

== Aftermath of the fire ==
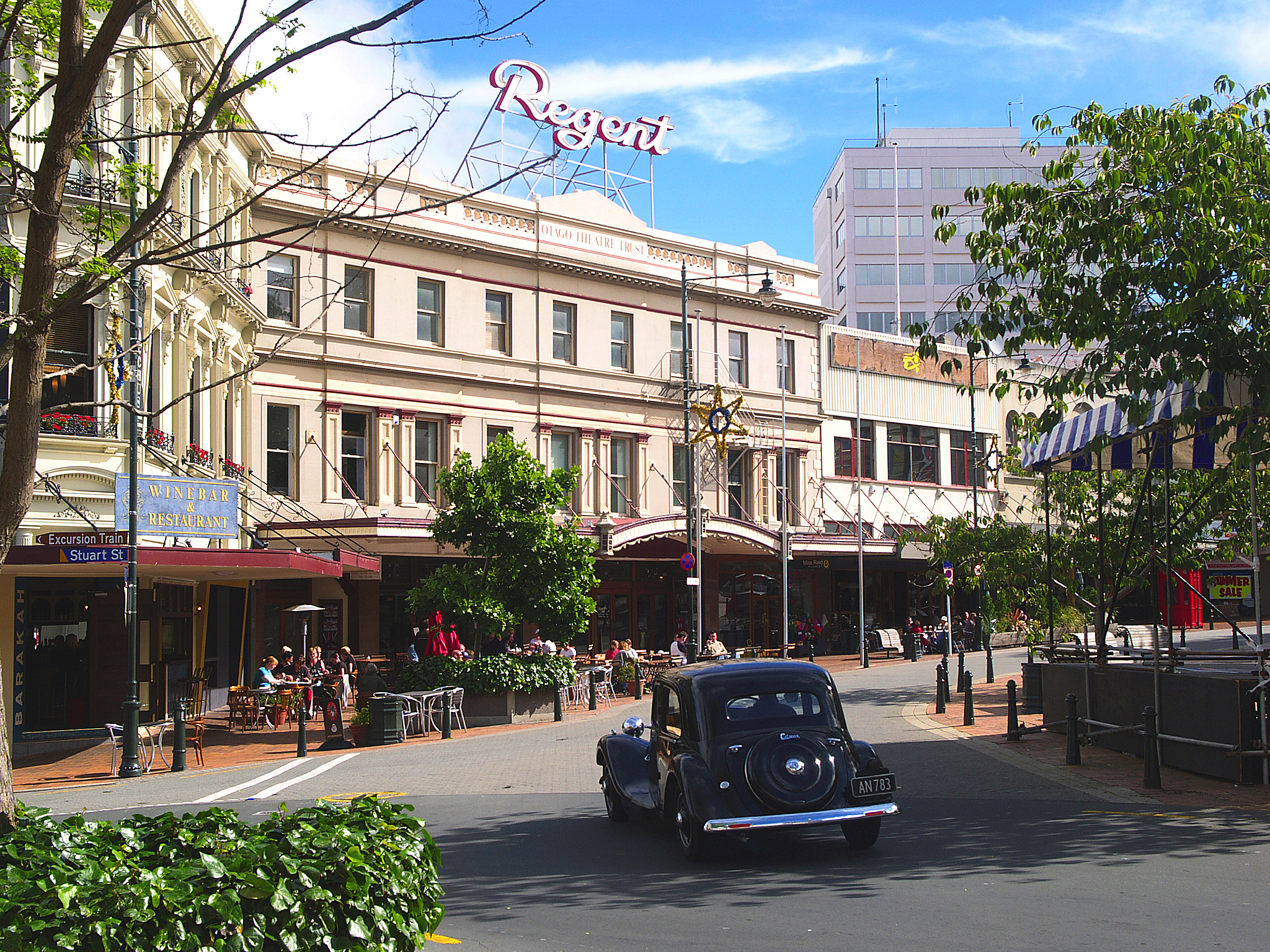
The site of the fire is now largely occupied by the Regent Theatre.

An inquest into the fire was held before the City Coroner, Dr. Thomas Hocken, later in September. It criticised the fire service, but found that the building was in poor condition and likely substandard, and that the fire was wilfully set by Waters for insurance purposes. The jury, however, considered that he did not intend to cause loss of life.

Waters was sent to trial and charged with arson and with the murder of Robert Wilson, but was found not guilty.

== The site today ==
A new Ross's Buildings was built after the fire in late 1880, but only lasted for a few years.

The land where Ross's Buildings stood is now occupied by the Regent Theatre, built in 1928. Rubble from the fire was unearthed in 2011 in a layer of charcoal-laden soil during renovations to the theatre, including crockery, old bottles, and a clay pipe. The Regent Theatre has a reputation for being haunted, with some believing it to contain the spirits of those killed in the fire.
