= Charles Wordsworth (cricketer) =

Australian cricketer

Personal information
- Full name: Charles William Wordsworth
- Born: 9 September 1877; Rotherham, Yorkshire, England
- Died: 10 June 1960 (aged 82); Redfern, Sydney, New South Wales, Australia
- Batting: Left-handed
- Bowling: Right-arm medium

Domestic team information
- Years: Team
- 1907/08: New South Wales
- 1908/09–1909/10: Otago

Career statistics
Competition	First-class
Matches	5
Runs scored	72
Batting average	8.00
100s/50s	0/0
Top score	19
Balls bowled	906
Wickets	16
Bowling average	25.43
5 wickets in innings	0
10 wickets in match	0
Best bowling	3/24
Catches/stumpings	1/–
- Source: ESPNcricinfo, 25 February 2024

Charles William Wordsworth (9 September 1877 – 10 June 1960) was an English-born cricketer and cricket coach who played in Australia and New Zealand during the early 20th century. He played first-class cricket for New South Wales and Otago between the 1907–08 and 1909–10 seasons.

Wordsworth was born at Rotherham in England in 1877. He worked as a baker. Primarily a bowler, he made his first-class cricket debut for New South Wales in a match against Queensland in April 1908, taking four wickets in the match. He played First Grade cricket in Sydney and was described as a "fast-medium to fast right-hand bowler and a left-hand batsman" who was "a fair performer" in Grade Cricket, and had taken seven and eight wickets in two matches during the 1907–08 season. A retrospective view of his career described Wordsworth as "a fast bowler, but an erratic one".

In November 1908 he and another Australian, Francis Ayles, were appointed as coaches by the Otago Cricket Association in New Zealand. Ayles was primarily a batting coach while Wordsworth, who the Otago Daily Times described as having "a reputation as a fast bowler", (Note: Several press sources describe Wordsworth as a fast bowler. Both CricInfo and CricketArchive list him as a medium pace bowler.) coached bowling and acted as a net bowler for practice sessions. The two men primarily coached young players and school cricketers, although they also worked with more established players.

As well as coaching, Wordsworth played club cricket for Albion Cricket Club in Dunedin and appeared in all three of Otago's first-class matches during his first season in New Zealand. He played in the team's only Plunket Shield match of the season, bowling "exceedingly well" and taking five wickets in the match, including dismissing Auckland's opening batsman first ball with "a very fast delivery ... which caught the top of the middle stump". He played against Wanganui―the Otago Cricket Association again praising his consistency bowling in its end of season report― (Note: This match is not considered first-class and CricketArchive has no reference to it in its database scorecards.) and Southland and in first-class matches against Hawke's Bay and Canterbury. He was the team's second leading wicket-taker of the 1908–09 season, taking 25 wickets; he also scored a half-century. (Note: Wordsworth half-century was not scored in a first-class fixture.)

Despite his performances as a player, the Association was unhappy about the way that young players had responded to coaching and had some doubts about Wordsworth's health and fitness due to rheumatism which affected his ability to bowl. He was reappointed in September 1909 for the following season, although Ayles was not. The appointment was criticised by the cricket correspondent of the Otago Witness who suggested that although Wordsworth was a reasonable net bowler, that his abilities as a coach were limited, and that the Association could not afford to pay for just a "ground bowler". In October the Association responded by announcing that Wordsworth had, indeed, been appointed as a ground bowler, although he would take some coaching duties alongside Australian Test cricketer Charlie Macartney who had been persuaded too spend the 1909–10 season in Dunedin by the Association. Wordsworth played in Otago's first first-class match of the season, a December fixture against Canterbury, without taking a wicket. He did not appear in the team's two Plunket Shield matches later in the season. (Note: Macartney, who played 35 Test matches for Australia and was one of the Wisden Cricketers of the Year in 1922, played in all three matches in his only season in New Zealand.)

The season was Wordsworth's last in New Zealand, his performance as a coach judged to be, again, unsuccessful by the Otago Witness, although he played well in club cricket for Albion who he captained during the season. The following season he applied for a position as coach with the Wellington Cricket Association but was unsuccessful. After returning to Australia, he continued to play and coach cricket. By 1921 he was serving as a net bowler for the Australian I Zingari club at Rushcutters Bay near Sydney, although by this time he was reported as bowling slower than he had due to a knee injury.

Wordsworth died at Redfern in Sydney in 1960. He was aged 82.
