= John Jenkinson (New Zealand politician) =

New Zealand politician

The Honourable John Jenkinson JP
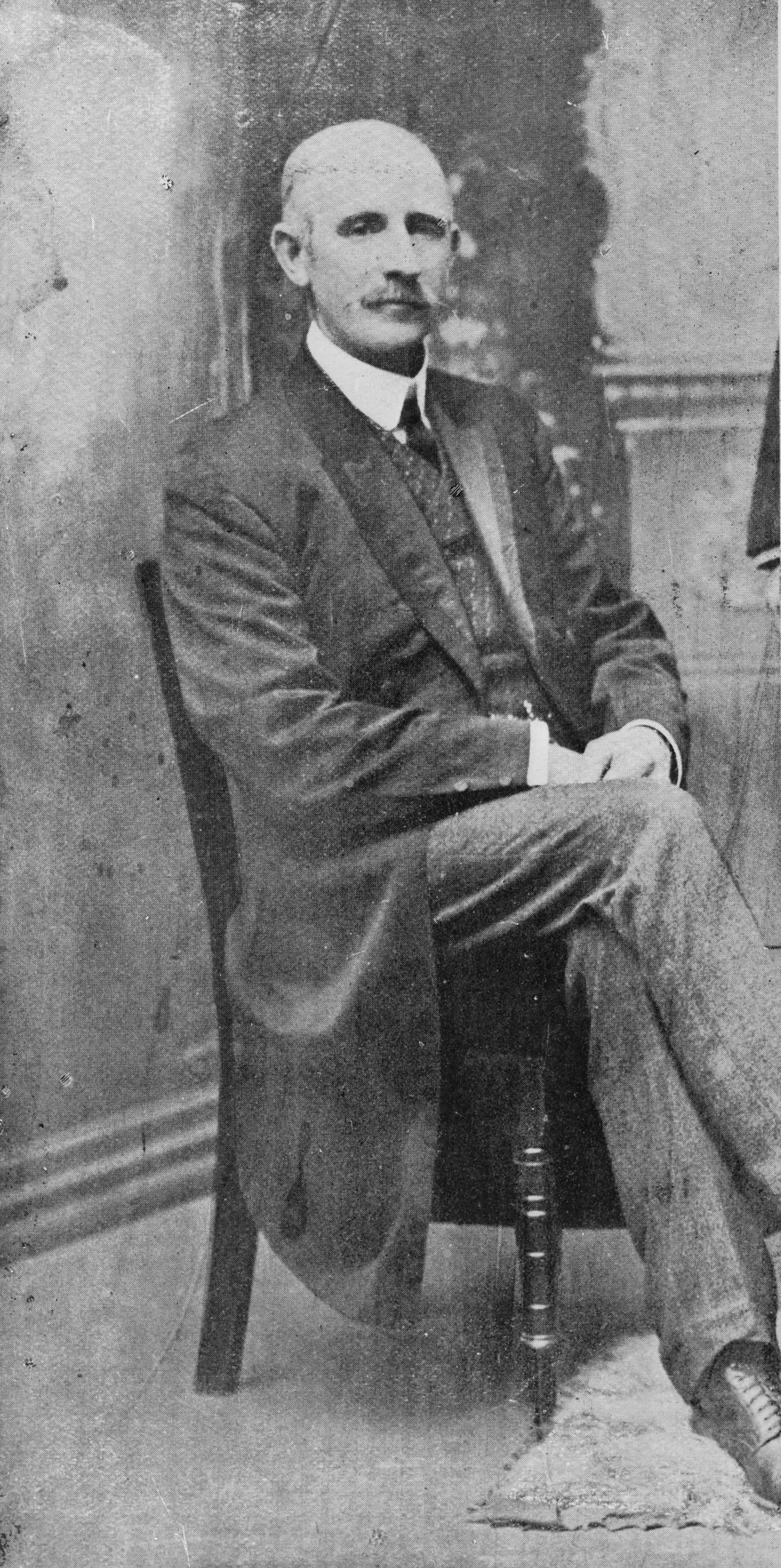

New Zealand Legislative Councillor
- In office 15 October 1892 – 30 June 1914
- Appointed by: John Ballance

Personal details
- Born: 17 October 1858 Dunedin, New Zealand
- Died: 29 November 1937 (aged 79) Wellington, New Zealand
- Party: Liberal

John Edward Jenkinson (17 October 1858 – 29 November 1937) was a member of the New Zealand Legislative Council. Active with trade unions for all his life, he was appointed to the Legislative Council in 1892 by the Liberal Government to achieve a Government majority, and he served until 1914.

== Early life ==
Jenkinson is a son of John Hartley Jenkinson, who emigrated to Dunedin in the early 1840s. Jenkinson senior was the first jettykeeper at the harbour of that city. Subsequently, his father moved to Port Molyneux, near Balclutha where, at various times, he was chairman of the road board, school committee, and county council. His mother was Jane Jenkinson (née Mathews).

Jenkinson junior was born in Dunedin in 1858 and appears on the Presbyterian baptism roll of that year. He was educated at various schools in the Otago region, and completed his studies under J. B. Park, of the South School, Dunedin. On leaving school in 1875, he was employed by Sparrow and Co., at the Dunedin Foundry, and served an apprenticeship of five years to boilermaking and iron shipbuilding. Jenkinson occupied rooms on the third floor of a building in The Octagon, Dunedin where a fire on 8 September 1879 killed twelve people, and after narrowly escaping through the staircase, he returned upstairs with his roommate, where they found a woman and brought her out.

== Union activity ==
Three months after joining the Dunedin Boilermakers' Union he was elected president of that body, and visited Australia to represent New Zealand at a conference with New South Wales, Victorian, and South Australian representatives, concerning the formation of an Australasian Federation of Boilermakers' Unions.

After returning to New Zealand in 1884, Jenkinson turned his attention to farming, and later on to gold digging. Subsequently, he went to Wellington, where he engaged in his trade, and assisted to form the first Wellington Boilermakers' Union. On returning to his old employers in Dunedin he was re-elected president of the Dunedin Boilermakers' Union, and assisted in forming the Trades Council. In 1886, he accepted employment in the Addington Railway Workshops, but left in the following year as a protest against the system of piecework, which was shortly afterwards abolished. Jenkinson returned to the Addington Workshops in 1888, and took an active part in the formation of the Christchurch Boilermakers' Union, of which he was secretary for several years, and afterwards president and also treasurer. He advocated and inaugurated scientific lectures under the auspices of the Union, and was successful in having the study of boilermaking promoted in the Canterbury School of Engineering. Jenkinson assisted in forming the Amalgamated Society of Railway Servants, and was a delegate from the Canterbury branch, at the first conference. He was one of the founders of the Canterbury Trades Council, and was successively its vice-president, president, and treasurer. Jenkinson helped to form the first Labour Day Demonstration Committee, of which he was treasurer for many years and a trustee. He was the first president of the Kingsley Club, which was formed for social unity, and he is president and honorary life member of the Tailoresses' Union.

== Legislative Council ==
Jenkinson was appointed to the Legislative Council on 15 October 1892. He was one of several appointees by the Liberal Government to achieve a Government majority. He resigned on 27 May 1893, but was reappointed only two weeks later on 6 June. Appointments were for seven-year periods, and he was reappointed on 6 June 1900 and 1 July 1907. He retired from the Legislative Council on 30 June 1914.

Jenkinson unsuccessfully contested the Clutha electorate for the Liberal Party in the 1914 general election against the incumbent, Alexander Malcolm.

== Private life ==
He was married on 3 July 1890 at Church of St Michael and All Angels, Christchurch to Annie, daughter of James Eaton of Christchurch and his wife Harriett Eaton (née Miles). John Hay, who successfully lobbied for the establishment of Fiordland National Park, was a brother in law. Annie Jenkinson died aged 50 years, and was buried at Karori Cemetery on 3 November 1915. He remarried on 30 September 1919, to Nellie McCredie, the daughter of Colonel Matthew McCredie.

He was a Justice of the Peace and also an Official Visitor to the Sunnyside Asylum. In 1901, Jenkinson lived in Wellington, where he owned the New Zealand Cycle Works. He later lived in Feilding, but returned to Wellington for the last three years of his life. He died in Wellington on 29 November 1937, aged 79. He was buried at Karori Cemetery next to his first wife on 30 November. He was survived by his second wife and his son Edgar, whilst his son Horace (1893–1917) was killed in action in France in World War I.
