= Robert Burns (Steell) =

Series of statues by John Steell

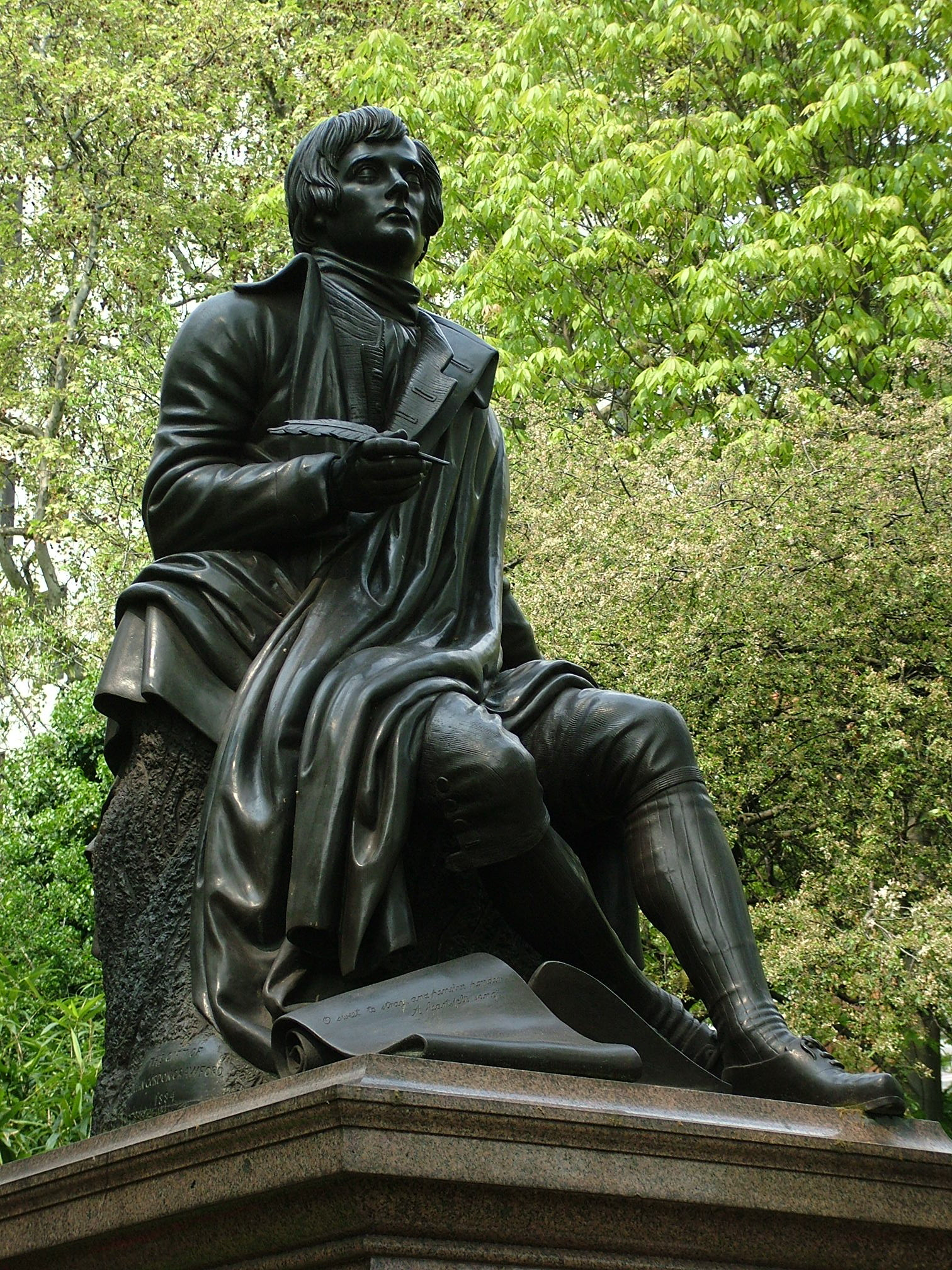
- The sculpture in London in 2006
- Artist: John Steell
- Type: Sculpture
- Medium: Bronze
- Subject: Robert Burns
- Location: Dundee, Dunedin, London, New York City

Robert Burns is a bronze portrait statue of Robert Burns by John Steell. Four versions exist, in New York City (United States), Dundee (Scotland), London (England), and Dunedin (New Zealand).

== New York statue ==
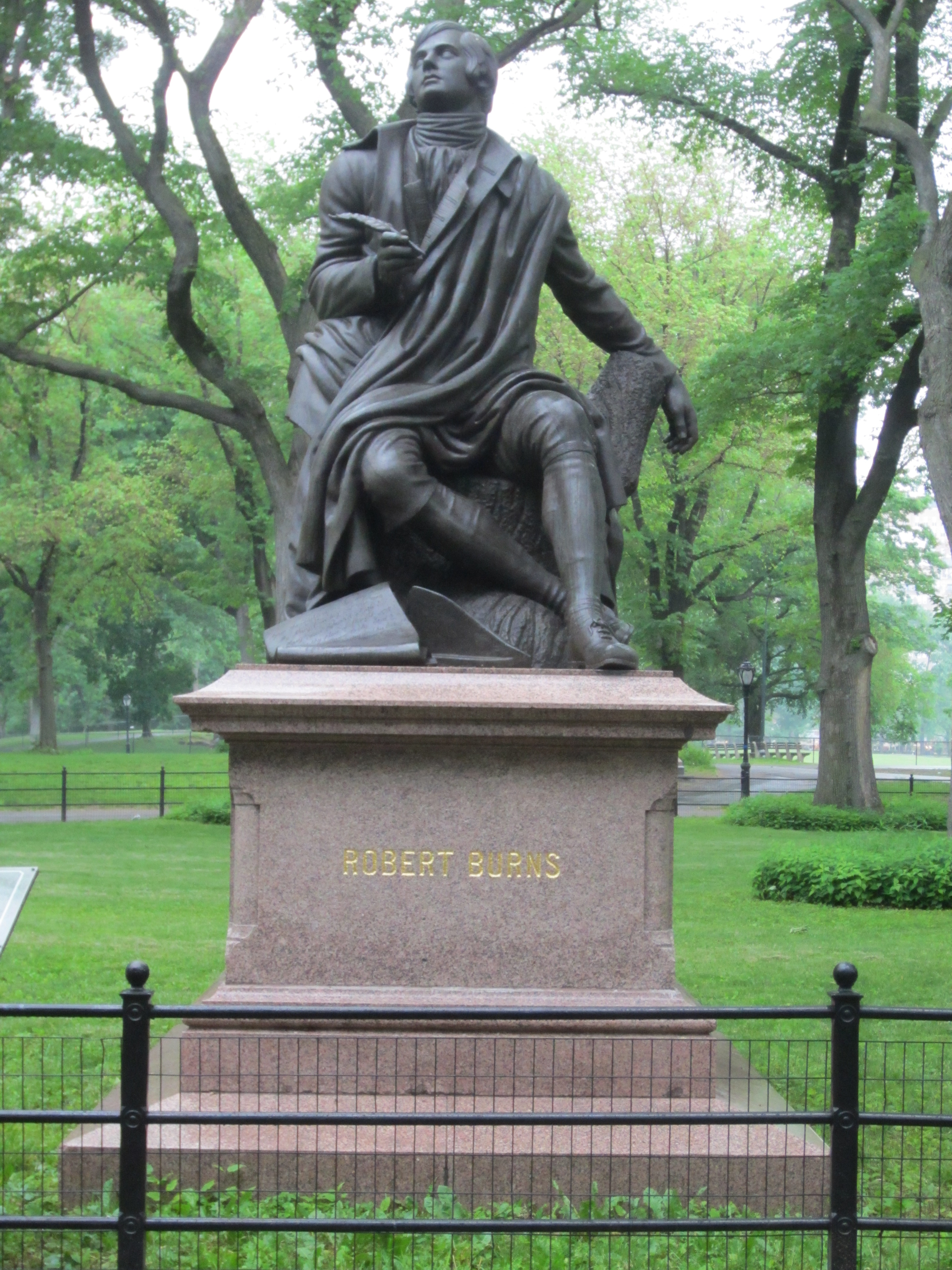
The statue in New York

The memorial sculpture in Manhattan's Central Park was cast c. 1880 and dedicated on 2 October 1880. It was the first statue of Burns to be erected outside Scotland and was a gift to the City of New York from Saint Andrew's Society of the State of New York and the Scottish-American community. For this sculpture Steell closely followed the portrait of Burns painted by Alexander Nasmyth in 1787. Seated on a tree stump with a quill pen in one hand, Burns looks up to heaven. He is thinking of his true love Mary Campbell, who died at an early age. It was to her that he had written the poem "To Mary in Heaven" inscribed on the scroll at his feet.

The statue is located at 40°46′12.5″N 73°58′21.0″W.

== The Scottish and English statues ==
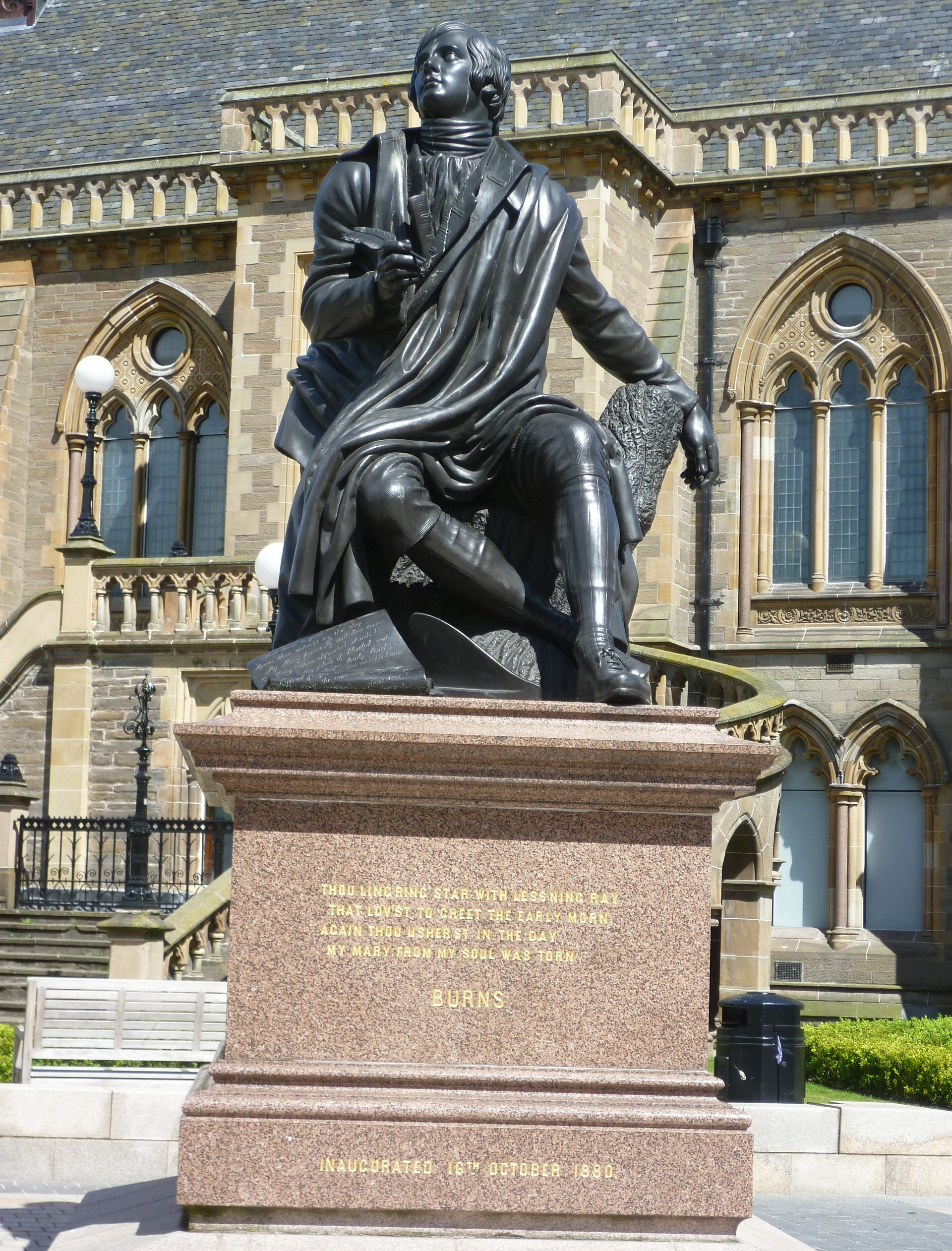
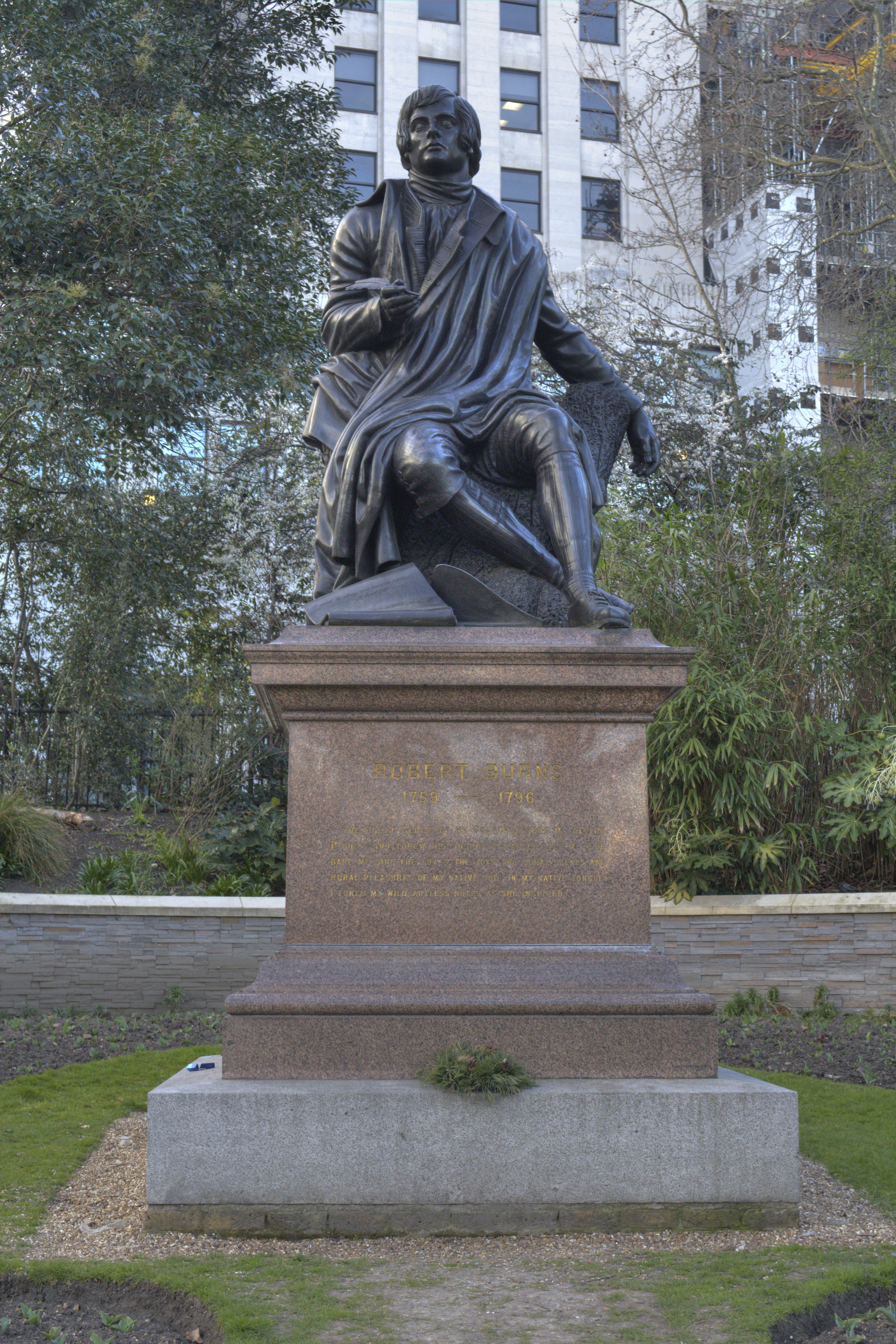
The statues in Dundee and London

The Dundee statue was unveiled only two weeks after the one in New York in 1880 and the third cast was erected on the Thames Embankment in London in 1884. The Dundee statue is located at 56°27′44.5″N 02°58′19.0″W and the London statue is located at 51°30′30.5″N 00°07′18.5″W.

== Dunedin statue ==
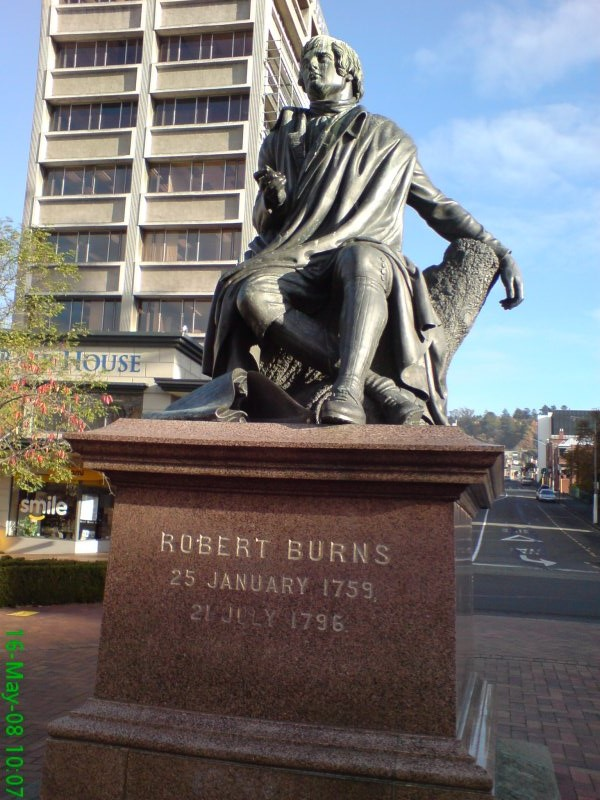
The statue in Dunedin

The Dunedin statue was the last of the set to be unveiled, on 24 May 1887. A statue of Burns was deemed relevant to the city, both because of the city's Scottish roots (it was founded by the Free Church of Scotland in 1848), and also because one of the city's founding fathers was Rev. Thomas Burns, a nephew of the poet.

In likeness, it is closest to the London statue. There had been discussion whether to place the statue in front of the railway station, but an elevated placement in The Octagon, the central plaza of Dunedin, was eventually chosen. The statue was unveiled by Miss Burns, a great-grand niece of Robert Burns. Speeches were given by former Governor and Premier of New Zealand Sir George Grey, and Richard Henry Leary, the Mayor of Dunedin. Cyril Croker, a solicitor who spent his teenage years in Dunedin, would say of the statue that:

It was situated between the Cathedral and two hotels, and, true to his reputation, Burns had his back to the Cathedral, and his face to the pub.

Because of its placement on what is now known as the McMillan terrace, the statue is the backdrop to many public speeches. On 27 July 1988, the statue was registered by the New Zealand Historic Places Trust as a Category I heritage structure with reference number 2208. The statue is located at 45°52′26.5″S 170°30′11.5″E.

== See also ==
- List of Robert Burns memorials
- List of sculptures in Central Park
