= Dunedin Athenaeum and Mechanics' Institute =

Private lending library in Dunedin, New Zealand

Coordinates: 45.874886°S 170.503799°E

Dunedin Athenaeum and Workers' Institute
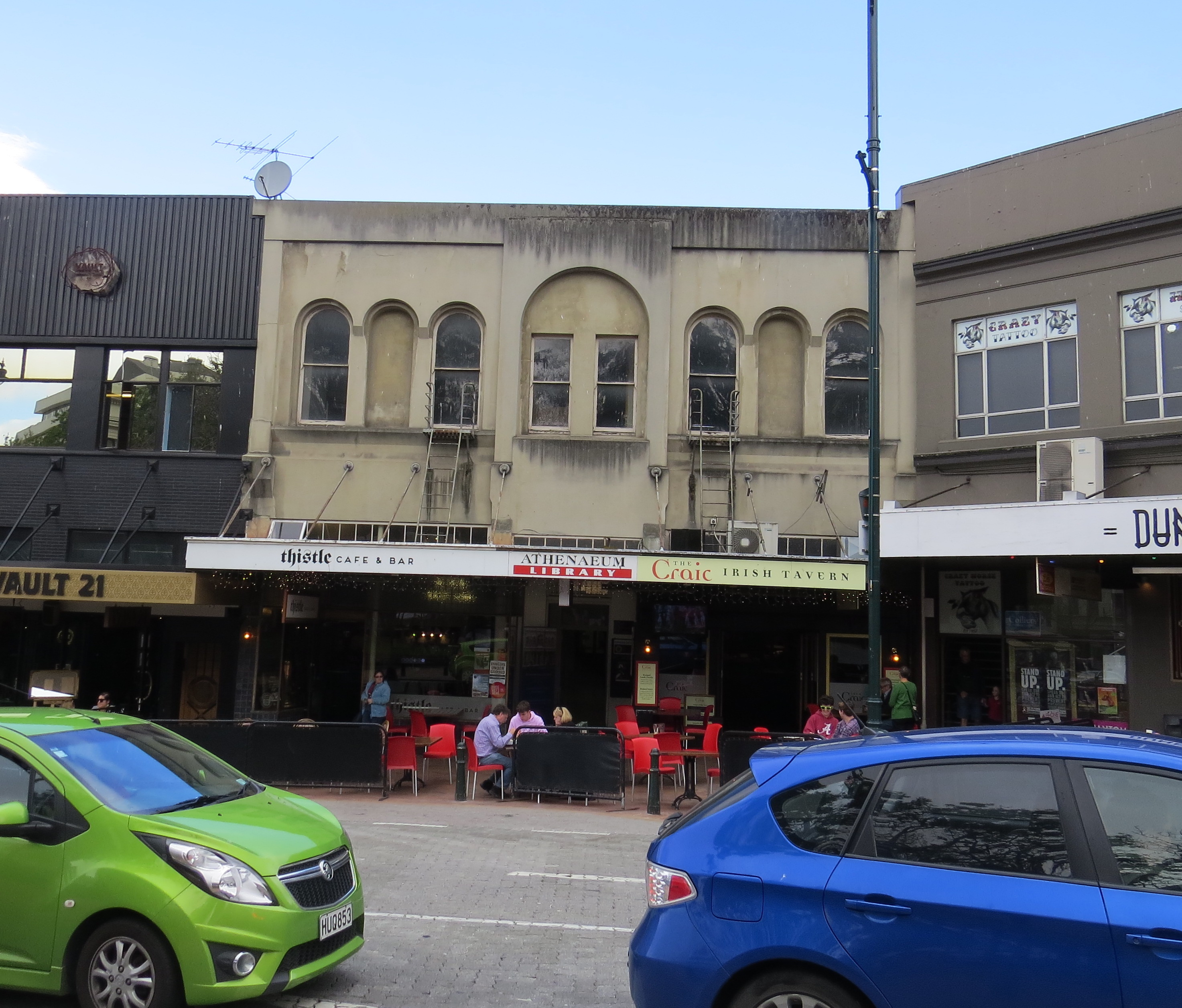

General information
- Location: Dunedin, New Zealand
- Opened: 1870
- Owner: Lawrie Forbes

Design and construction
- Architect: David Ross

Website
- https://www.dunedinathenaeum.org.nz

Dunedin Athenaeum and Mechanics' Institute is the oldest continuously operating library in New Zealand. Established to provide education, public lectures, a space for community meetings and access to newspapers, periodicals and books. Presently it operates a subscription lending library and also as an events space for book launches, the annual National Poetry Day and other literary events. The building includes a basement theatre that has been operated by the Dunedin Collaborative Theatre Trust since 2016. The Athenaeum building is one of the oldest athenaeums in New Zealand still used for its original purpose, and is classified as a "Category I" ("places of 'special or outstanding historical or cultural heritage significance or value'") historic place by Heritage New Zealand Pouhere Taonga, previously known as the New Zealand Historic Places Trust.

== History ==
The institute was established in 1851 as The Mechanics' Institution. The Reverend Thomas Burns was instrumental in the formation of the institution, alongside James Macandrew, William Cargill, and John McGlashan. The original aims of the institution were:

‘Lectures and classes for public instruction upon such subjects as natural philosophy, history, astronomy, geology, chemistry, political economy, music, languages, etc., and also to have regular fortnightly meetings of the members for mutual improvement by essays, reading and conversational inquiry.'

The institute opened on Princes Street (the current site of the Cargill Monument) on 8 January 1853, in a two-room building designed by James Macandrew's brother, Daniel Macandrew. As one of very few community buildings in Dunedin at that time, the rooms were used for other events such as Provincial Council and Town Board meetings. By 1858 there were 20 members but there had been no classes and very few or no books were held. The institute was renamed the Dunedin Athenaeum and Mechanics' Institute from 1859, and received a £1000 grant from the Provincial Council for a new building. The new building was sited on the corner of Manse and High Streets, next to the Princess Theatre, and was completed in June 1862.

By the late 1860s, membership had increased due to the Otago gold rush, and the second building was no longer large enough. That building became the Dunedin City Council Chambers, before being demolished in 1918.

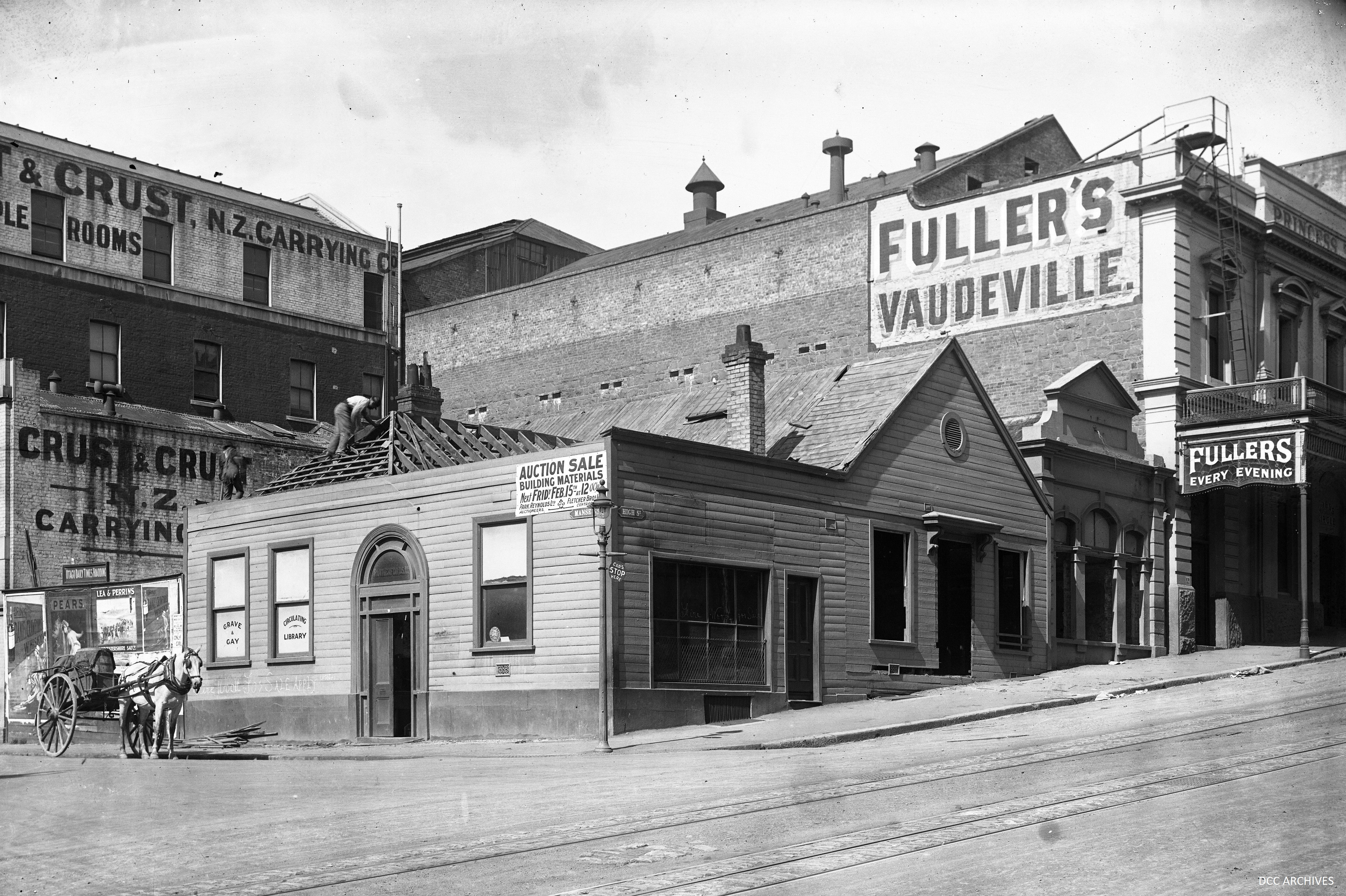
The Athenaeum building, later the Dunedin City Council Chambers, on the corner of Manse and High Streets, during demolition in 1918.

A site for the third and final building was purchased in the Octagon, and a new building was commissioned from prominent architect David Ross (1827–1908), and opened by the Premier William Fox on 9 May 1870. The two-storey building was constructed of bluestone and brick, and incorporated a library, reading room, ladies room, and three classrooms. The annual membership was $2.10, with a life membership available for $21. Two shopfronts were also included to provide the institute with rental income.

When the new building was opened, there were 742 members and more than 62,000 books. Membership peaked in 1910 when there were more than 1900 members. By the 150th anniversary, in 2020, there were fewer than 100 members. In 2026 membership began to increase and events such National Poetry Day

The Dunedin City Council bought the building from the Athenaeum Society in October 2007 for $1.13m. As of 2021, the building is owned by heritage property developer Lawrie Forbes.

Heritage New Zealand considers that Dunedin Athenaeum and Mechanics' Institute building is of special significance as a "rare urban survivor" of the pioneering adult education organisations of the mid-1800s. The building is classified as a Category I historic place.

== Lending library ==
The private lending library is open Tuesday and Wednesday 10am-2pm.Thursday 2pm-4pm. The library welcomes new members and is available to hire for literary events. The library hosts poetry readings, a book club and a radio show, Books Uncovered, on Otago Access Radio.

== New Athenaeum Theatre ==
In 2017, the basement of the Athenaeum building, previously home to the Otago Cinema Club, was converted to a theatre space, and reopened under the name the New Athenaeum Theatre. This space had hosted the Fortune Theatre Company between 1973 and 1978, when they moved to the former Trinity Methodist Church. In January 2021 the Dunedin City Council announced that it had included $21.5 million in the 10-year plan to develop a midsize (350–450 seat) theatre venue for the city, for which it was considering the New Athenaeum Theatre or the Mayfair Theatre.
