= Ayles =

Ayles is an English surname. Notable people with the name include:

- Adam Ayles (1850–1912), English Arctic explorer
- Walter Ayles (1879–1953), British Labour Party politician
- Francis Ayles (1880–1939), Australian cricketer and football umpire
- Lewis C. Ayles (1927–2009), Canadian politician
- Eric Ayles (1928–1972), English rugby league footballer
- Gary Ayles (born 1964), British racing car driver
- Darryl Ayles (born 1992), Canadian film director
