= David Ross (architect) =

Scottish-born New Zealand architect (1828–1908)

- Born: 1828; Aberdeen, Scotland
- Died: 6 October 1908 (aged 80); Auckland, New Zealand
- Occupation: Architect
- Buildings: Moray Place Congregational Church, Dunedin (1864); Otago Museum, Dunedin (1874); St James' Church, Palmerston (1876); Union Steam Ship Company Offices, Dunedin (1883)

David Ross (1828 – 6 October 1908) was a Scottish-born New Zealand architect, active in Dunedin and Auckland, as well as Sydney in Australia for much of the 1860s to 1890s. He was the designer of a number of heritage listed buildings in Otago.

== Early life ==
Born in Aberdeen, in Scotland, in 1828, David Ross was one of two sons of a watchmaker and his wife. Once his schooling was completed, he commenced his architectural career in 1850 with an apprenticeship to a firm based in Elgin. He later worked for architects in England before, in 1857, emigrating to Melbourne in Australia.

== Professional practice ==
By 1858, Ross, who had married Agnes Marshall by this time, was practicing in Melbourne on his own account with a number of ecclesiastical and dwelling commissions subsequently completed in the city. This may have included, at least partially, the St Mary of the Angels Basilica in Geelong. In 1862, he and his family moved to New Zealand, settling in Dunedin. He was briefly in partnership with William Mason but this arrangement did not last and it was dissolved. Ross went on to design several notable buildings in Dunedin and elsewhere in Otago. He also served as a city councillor for Dunedin in 1865.

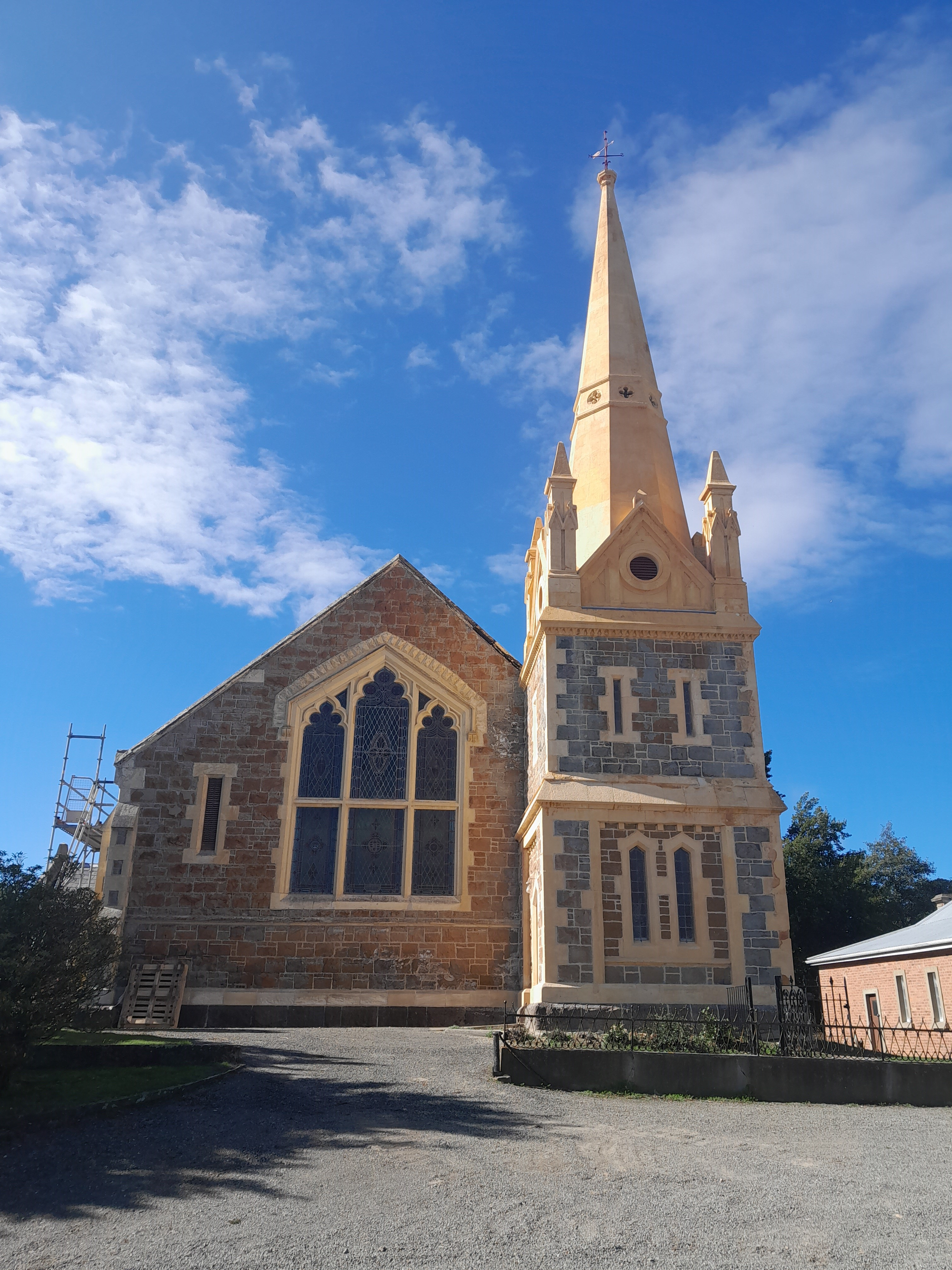
Ross's St James Church at Palmerston

One of his earliest works as a sole practitioner was Moray Place Congregational Church; a Gothic-styled structure with capacity for 500 people, it was completed in 1864. The oldest surviving ecclesiastical building in Dunedin, it was listed as a category 2 heritage building by Heritage New Zealand in 2005. Another ecclesiastical commission was St James' Church at Palmerston, built in 1876 and listed as a category 1 heritage building in 2011.

Ross was a proponent of the use of concrete, one of the earliest architects in New Zealand to do so; one of his designs utilising this material is the Otago Museum, the construction of which commenced in 1874. Another building that incorporated some concrete is the heritage listed courthouse in the town of Lawrence, which was built from 1874 to 1875. Ross's offices in The Octagon were destroyed in a deadly fire in 1879. Luckily for Ross, he was overseas at the time.

In 1883, Ross designed the Italianate-styled Union Steam Ship Company Offices building on Water Street in Dunedin. The same year he won first prize in a design competition for the Auckland Harbour Board building. He relocated to Auckland, where he supervised the construction of the building which was very similar in appearance to his design for the Union Steam Ship Company Offices building. He lived in Auckland for three years and also worked on additions to Charleville, the residence of Alfred Issacs in Remuera, and the Star Hotel in Onehunga.

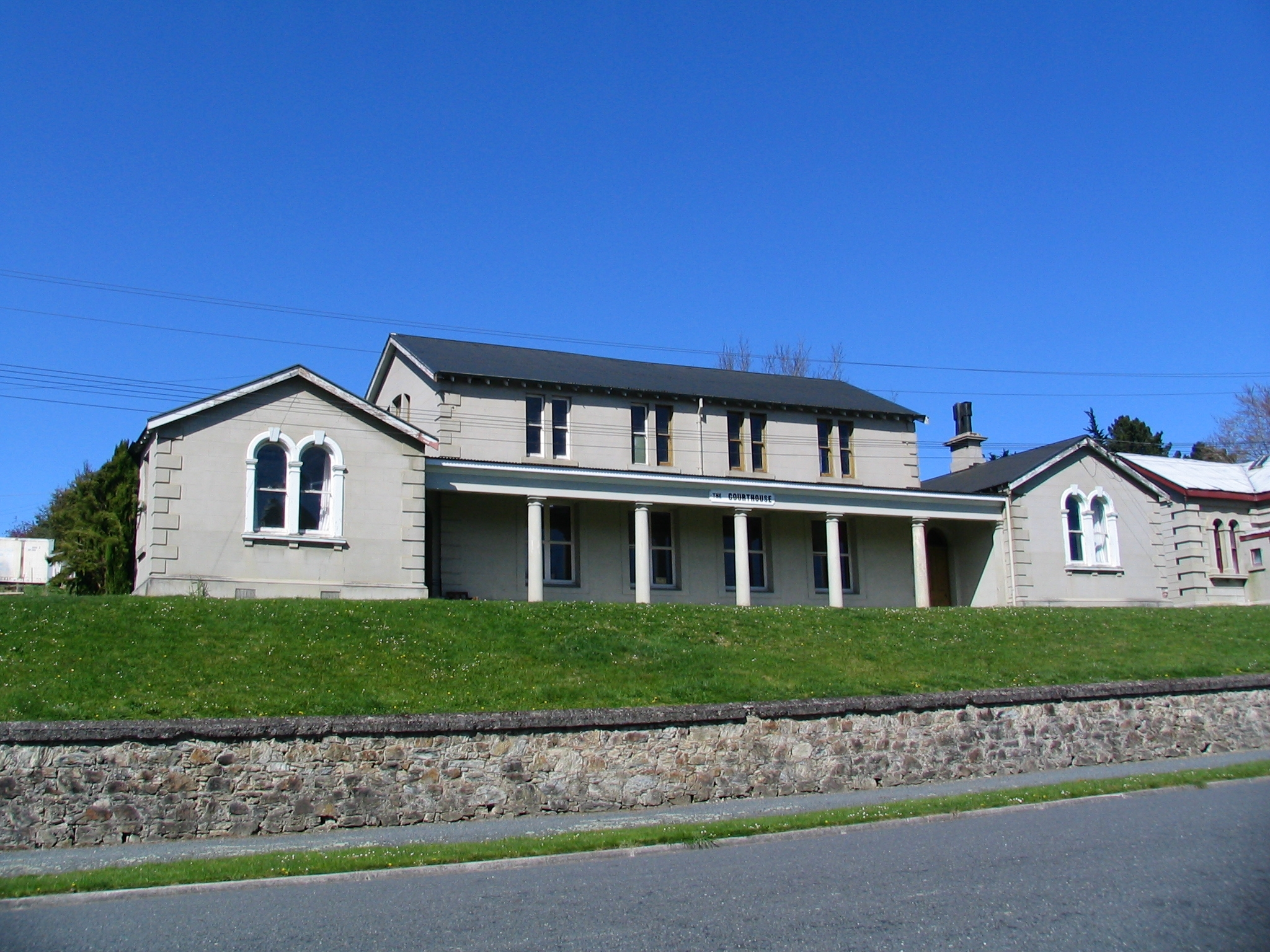
The Lawrence courthouse building designed by Ross in 1874

In 1886, Ross, who by that time was no longer living with his wife, went back to Australia, basing himself in Sydney for the next seven years. His output during this time included that city's St George's Hall. He then returned to New Zealand, where he took up residence in Wellington. There his architectural work was limited; he designed only two dwellings and a commercial building during the two years he lived in Wellington. One of the dwellings was the subject of a legal dispute as Ross was not paid for his work.

== Later life ==
Ross later practiced in Perth, Western Australia around 1895, working alongside his nephew Frederick William Burwell for a time, before reverting to a sole practitioner. In 1903, he relocated to Johannesburg in South Africa. Ross returned to New Zealand in 1906, settling in Auckland. A Fellow of the Royal Institute of British Architects, he became ill and died at Auckland Hospital on 6 October 1908, aged 80. Buried in Waikumete Cemetery, he was survived by two daughters. An infant son had died in France in 1880 while Ross was travelling in Europe and his wife had predeceased him in 1894.
