= Regent Theatre, Dunedin =

Theatre in Dunedin, New Zealand

Regent Theatre
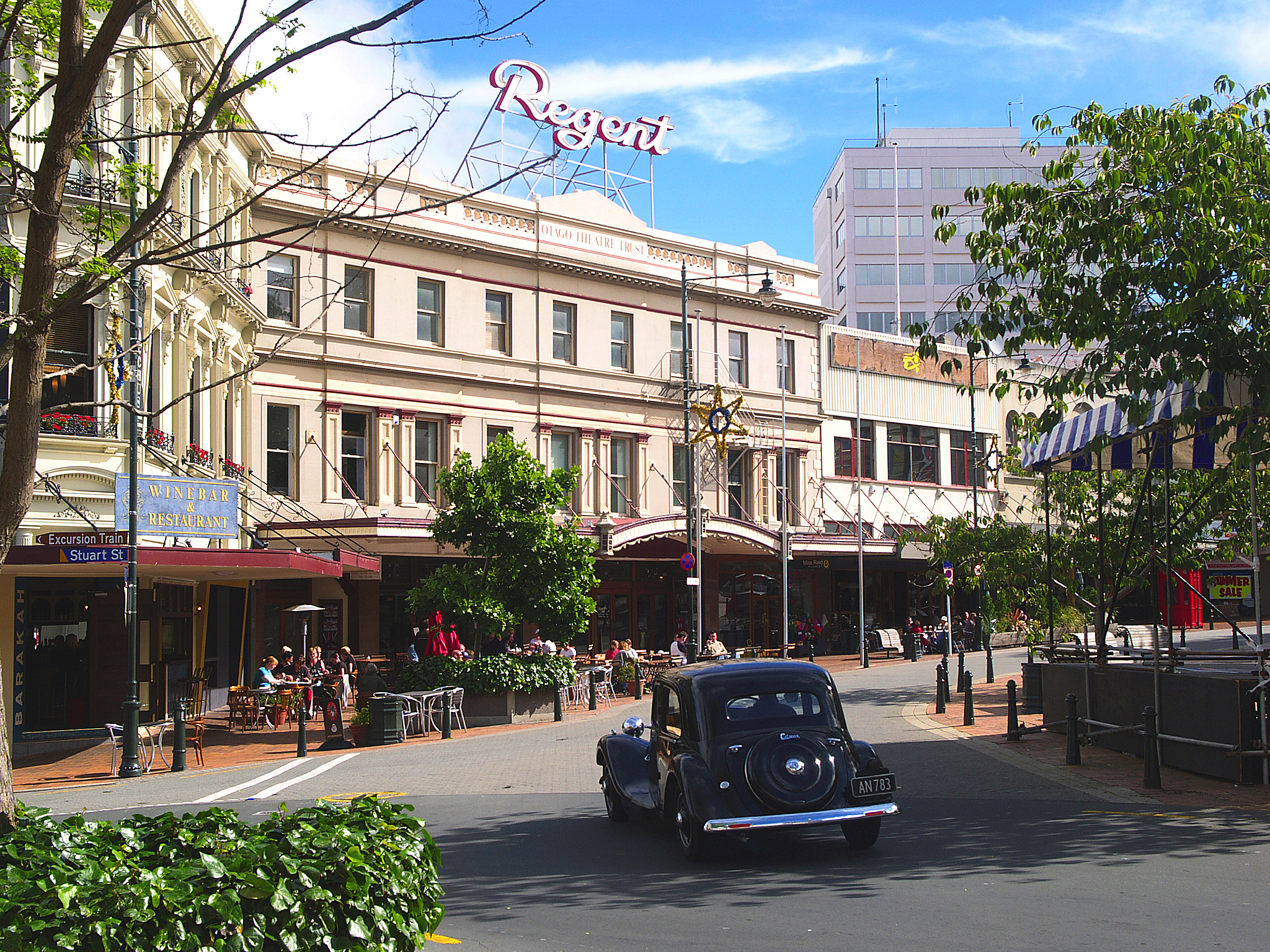
- The Regent Theatre, Dunedin in 2007
- Interactive map of Regent Theatre
- Address: 17 The Octagon; Dunedin; New Zealand
- Coordinates: 45.874649°S 170.503988°E
- Owner: Otago Theatre Trust
- Capacity: 1,684
- Designation: Historic Place - Category I

Construction
- Opened: 1 June 1928
- Architect: James Hodge White

Website
- www.regenttheatre.co.nz

Heritage New Zealand – Category 1
- Designated: 26 November 1987
- Reference no.: 4363

The Regent Theatre is a theatre in Dunedin, New Zealand, with a seating capacity of about 1,650. It is in The Octagon, the city's central plaza, directly opposite the Municipal Chambers (Dunedin Town Hall) and close to the Dunedin Public Art Gallery.

== History ==
Originally a 2,000 seat cinema the Regent opened on 1 June 1928, and the interior is elaborately decorated in a revived baroque style, characteristic of the super cinemas of the time. The design is a variation of Robert Atkinson's for the 1921 Regent cinema in Brighton, England, which was demolished in 1974. There were comparable picture palaces in other cities in Britain and Australia, few of which now survive and, apart from the Dunedin building, none in their original form. (There was one in Brisbane which survived until recently, Regent Theatre (Brisbane), another in Sydney, Regent Theatre (Sydney) demolished in 1988, and a still existing but re-modelled structure in Melbourne, Regent Melbourne.) All these designs are descended from Charles Garnier's for the Paris Opera, (palais Garnier) completed in 1875. The Regent's auditorium succeeds in replaying the exuberance of the original in a very different time and space.

The Dunedin building's supervising architect was James Hodge White (1896–1970), one of the founders of the Dunedin architectural firm Miller White & Dunn. It was sited behind a building on the Octagon designed by David Ross (1828–1908) which was first opened in 1876. The Octagon building was given an additional storey in 1880 and remodelled at the ground floor in 1928 to provide the present theatre entrance.

Purchased by the Otago Theatre Trust in 1973, the building has since been adapted to work as a live venue, although it still also functions as a cinema during film festivals every year. It is now owned by the Dunedin City Council.

At the end of 2010, the theatre began $7.5 million refurbishments including upgrading the flying system, replacing the chairs, carpet and other work. It was re-opened on 30 July 2011 with a 'thank you' concert for sponsors.

== Annual book sale ==
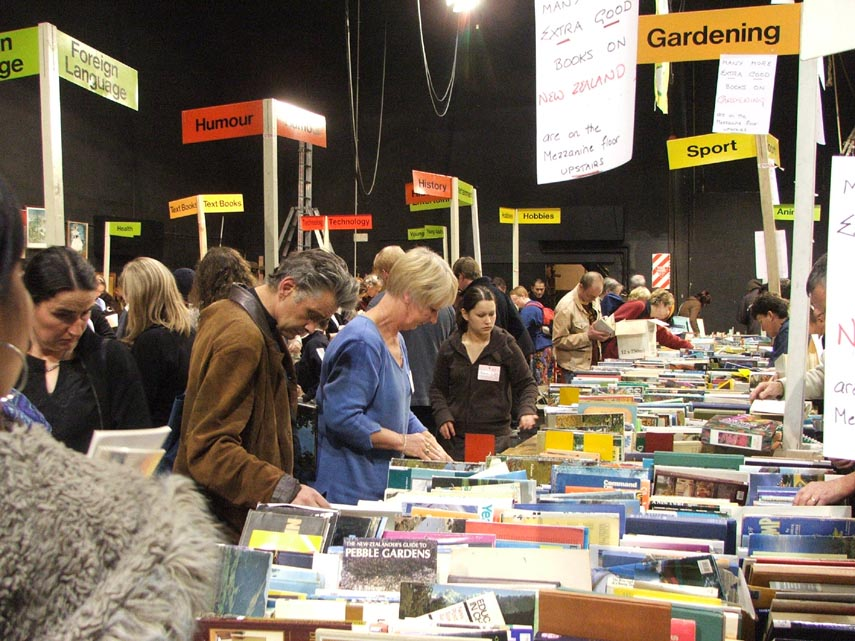
Bibliophiles pore over books at the annual Regent Book Sale

As it is run by a charitable trust, the theatre relies on the support of the local community for its continued existence.

A major part of this support is the Regent 24-hour Book Sale, the largest sale of second-hand books in New Zealand, and reputedly the largest in the Southern Hemisphere. Every year since 1979, books donated by the general public have been sold by volunteers to raise money for the theatre. Over 200,000 books are on sale each year, most of them priced at NZ$1 each (although a smaller number of specialist books are on sale at a higher price). The price of an ordinary book was 50c until 2008, when it was doubled. Buyers come from throughout New Zealand for the sale, which has become a major event on Dunedin's calendar, and raises around $100,000 annually.

The sale was held at the theatre each year, usually in May, until 2022 (excluding a two-year hiatus made necessary by the COVID-19 pandemic) over a single session lasting 24 hours. Goods donated other than books and magazines (such as DVD and CDs) were sold in a separate sale earlier in the year. In 2023 the sale was moved to the Edgar Centre in South Dunedin. With the larger space of the indoor stadium available, all donated goods are sold in the same sale which — though still called the Regent 24-hour Book Sale — now takes place over two 12-hour sessions across one weekend in March. The 2024 book sale raised a record $NZ 114,885.70.

== Claimed hauntings ==
The theatre has some associated ghost folklore, with patrons claiming a feeling of someone or something kicking the underside of seats, taps being turned on, and clocks stopping. The theatre is built on the site of buildings destroyed in the Octagon fire of 1879.
