= Francis Ayles =

Australian cricketer

Personal information
- Born: 30 March 1880; Sandridge, Melbourne, Australia
- Died: 18 June 1939 (aged 59); Newmarket, Melbourne, Australia
- Role: Batsman

Domestic team information
- Years: Team
- 1908/09: Otago
- Source: ESPNcricinfo, 5 May 2016

Francis Ayles (30 March 1880 – 18 June 1939) was an Australian cricketer and football umpire.

Ayles, a batsman, was the captain of Port Melbourne Cricket Club when he was appointed by the Otago Cricket Association as a batting coach in November 1908, working alongside Charles Wordsworth who was appointed as bowling coach. He played three first-class matches for Otago as a batsman in 1908–09, scoring 81 runs at an average of 20.25. He opened the batting in Otago's match against Hawke's Bay in January 1909, scoring 47 and putting on 176 for the first wicket with Gillie Wilson. Ayles returned to Melbourne in April 1909.

Ayles was also an Australian rules football umpire. He umpired 13 matches in the Victorian Football League between 1908 and 1919, and was appointed field umpire for the Tasmanian Football League in 1911. Before turning to umpiring he played for Port Melbourne in the Victorian Football Association.
