= Michael Aytes =

American politician

Michael Aytes is the Director of Homeland Security Programs at US Investigation Services, the (now privatized) former Office of Federal Investigations, a U.S. government agency in the Office of Personnel Management, which is the nation's largest investigative and support services company.

== Professional career ==
Previously, Aytes served as senior advisor to the USCIS director, and was Acting Deputy Director of U.S. Citizenship and Immigration Services (USCIS) from April 18, 2008 until 2009.

Prior to his appointment at USCIS, Aytes served as Associate Director, USCIS Domestic Operations Directorate, responsible for processing of all immigration benefits and services within the United States. Previously, he served from 1999 to 2006 as Director, Information and Customer Service, which coordinates and manages the USCIS Telephone Centers; plans and implements USCIS customer-service functions; and serves as customer-service liaison for USCIS.

Prior to that assignment, he served in a variety of positions with the former Immigration and Naturalization Service, beginning his Federal career as an Immigration Inspector in Chicago in 1977. Significant assignments included serving as Appellate Examiner and founding member of the Administrative Appeals Office, 1983–1986; first Assistant Commissioner for Service Center Operations, 1989–1997; and Assistant Commissioner Adjudications Division, 1996–1997.
