= The Octagon, Dunedin =

City centre of Dunedin

Coordinates: 45°52′27″S 170°30′13″E

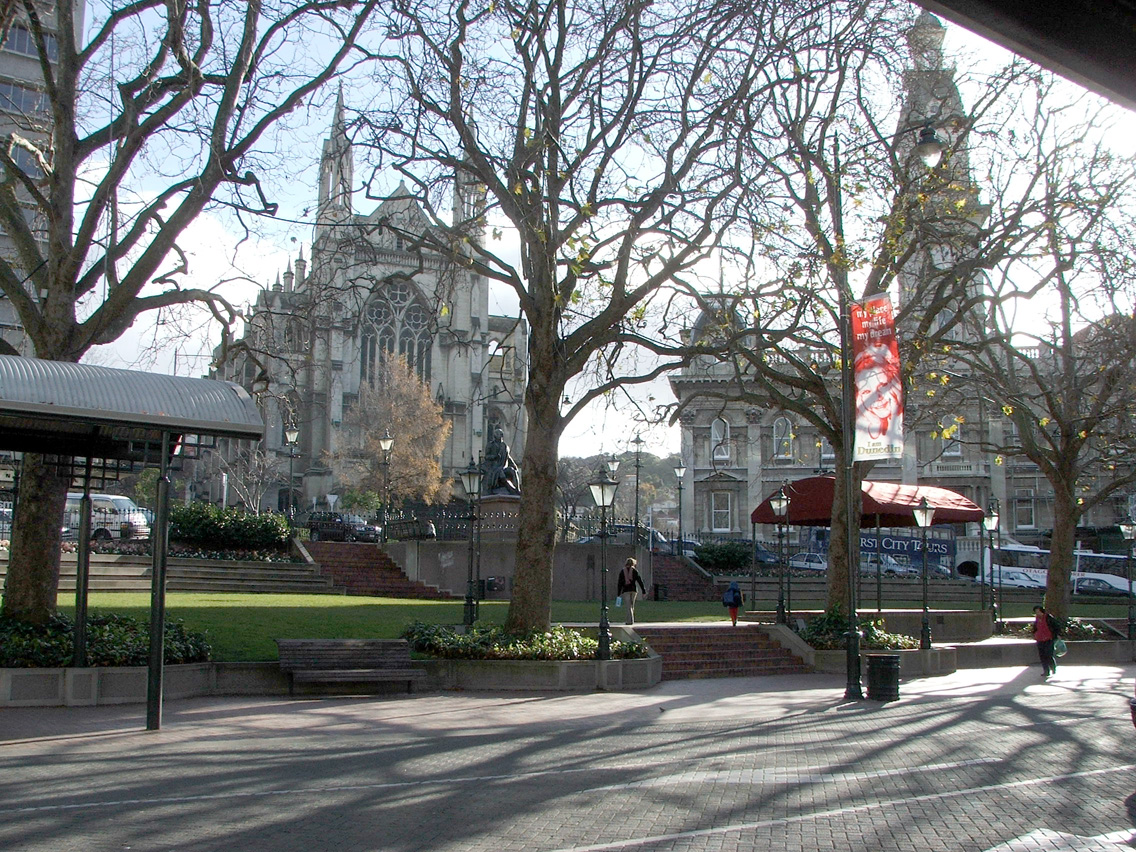
The Octagon, looking towards St. Paul's Cathedral (left) and the Municipal Chambers (Dunedin Town Hall) (right). The Robert Burns statue is visible in front of the cathedral.

The Octagon is the city centre of Dunedin, in the South Island of New Zealand. It is an eight-sided plaza with a circular one-way carriageway, bisected by the city's main street, and is also the central terminus of two other main thoroughfares. The Octagon is predominantly a pedestrian reserve, with grass and paved features, and is surmounted by a statue of the Scottish poet Robert Burns. Several of Dunedin's significant buildings and institutions adjoin the plaza, which is also a major hub for public transport in Dunedin, primarily taxi services. (Note: The Central City Bus Hub is now located on Great King Street.)

First laid out in 1846, the site was largely derelict for many years until the two major early parts of the city's settlement (to the north and south of the Octagon) were linked by the excavation of Bell Hill. From the 1890s on it rose to prominence as the city's central area. The Octagon was substantially renovated during the 1980s, and is now a centre of the city's cafe culture, with many al fresco dining areas.

New Year's Eve celebrations are held annually in The Octagon.

== Geography ==
Central Dunedin. The Octagon is the small octagonal area marked in red (numbered 2)

The Octagon is an eight-sided plaza bisected by the city's main street, which is called George Street to the northeast and Princes Street to the southwest. These form the axis of Dunedin's central business district.

Two other main thoroughfares terminate at the Octagon: Upper and Lower Stuart Streets. Lower Stuart Street is the shorter of the two, leading 600 metres southeast to Dunedin Railway Station and to State Highway 1, which passes through central Dunedin as two parallel one-way streets. Upper Stuart Street climbs steeply to the northwest as a major arterial route to the city's inner hill suburbs and beyond towards Three Mile Hill, one of the routes to the Taieri Plains and South Otago. Surrounding the Octagon is a larger octagonal street, Moray Place.

The Octagon is a major hub for public transport in Dunedin; the bus stops are actually mostly on approaching streets with one main stop in the southwestern quadrant, outside Reading cinema. In 2018, a new bus hub was created close to the corner of Moray Place and Great King Street (one block to the east of George Street), which reduced some of the bus traffic through the Octagon. Taxi stands occupy much of the northeastern quadrant.

== Features ==
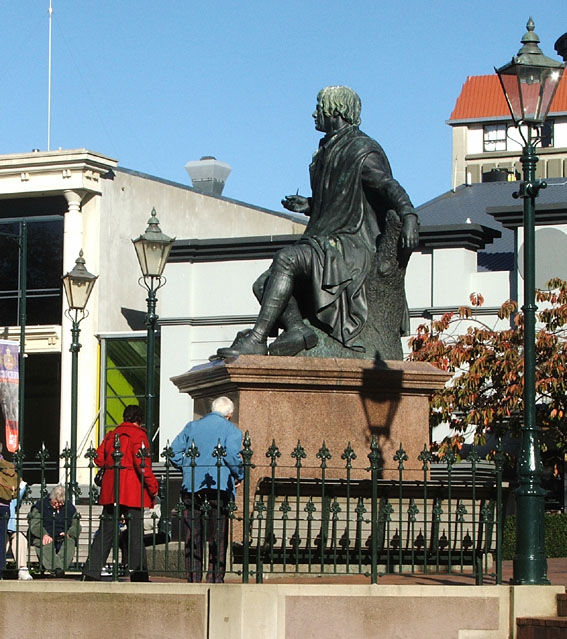
A statue of poet Robert Burns has pride of place in the upper Octagon.

Several of Dunedin's significant buildings and institutions face this plaza or closely adjoin it, of which three have New Zealand Historic Places Trust (NZHPT) recognition. The Dunedin Municipal Chambers (Dunedin Town Hall), Civic Centre and Public Library lie in the Octagon's northwestern quadrant, between George Street and Upper Stuart Street, as does St. Paul's Anglican Cathedral, which is separated from the municipal buildings by the narrow Harrop Lane. Both the Municipal Chambers and Cathedral are listed as Category I buildings by the NZHPT.

The Octagon's southwestern quadrant contains Dunedin Public Art Gallery, which sits on the former site of the D.I.C. building on the corner of Princes Street, a multiplex cinema, and a major office block, Forsyth Barr House. The southeastern quadrant contains the Regent Theatre (Dunedin's largest live theatre) and the Dunedin Athenaeum and Mechanics' Institute, which operates a private lending library and a theatre. Both of these structures also have Category I NZHPT ratings. Several cafes and bars complete this quadrant, and similar businesses also make up much of the Octagon's northeastern quadrant, along with a second office block, Burns House. Many of the Octagon's bars and cafes have provision for al fresco dining, making the Octagon a lively place.

The area within the roadway — with the exception of the central thoroughfare between George and Princes Streets — is a pedestrian reserve, grassed and terraced in the upper half, and paved in the lower. A street market occupies much of the paved area once a week. The paved area contains both water features and a giant chessboard. Both it and the grassed area in the upper octagon are frequently the venues for open-air meetings and entertainment. The terrace is surmounted by an 1887 statue by Sir John Steell of the Scottish poet Robert Burns, which has a Category I listing in the NZHPT register. The poet's nephew, Thomas Burns, was one of the founders of the city. The statue stands on the McMillan Terrace, a vantage point over the Octagon, which was presented to the city by philanthropist Alexander McMillan in 1967.

== History ==
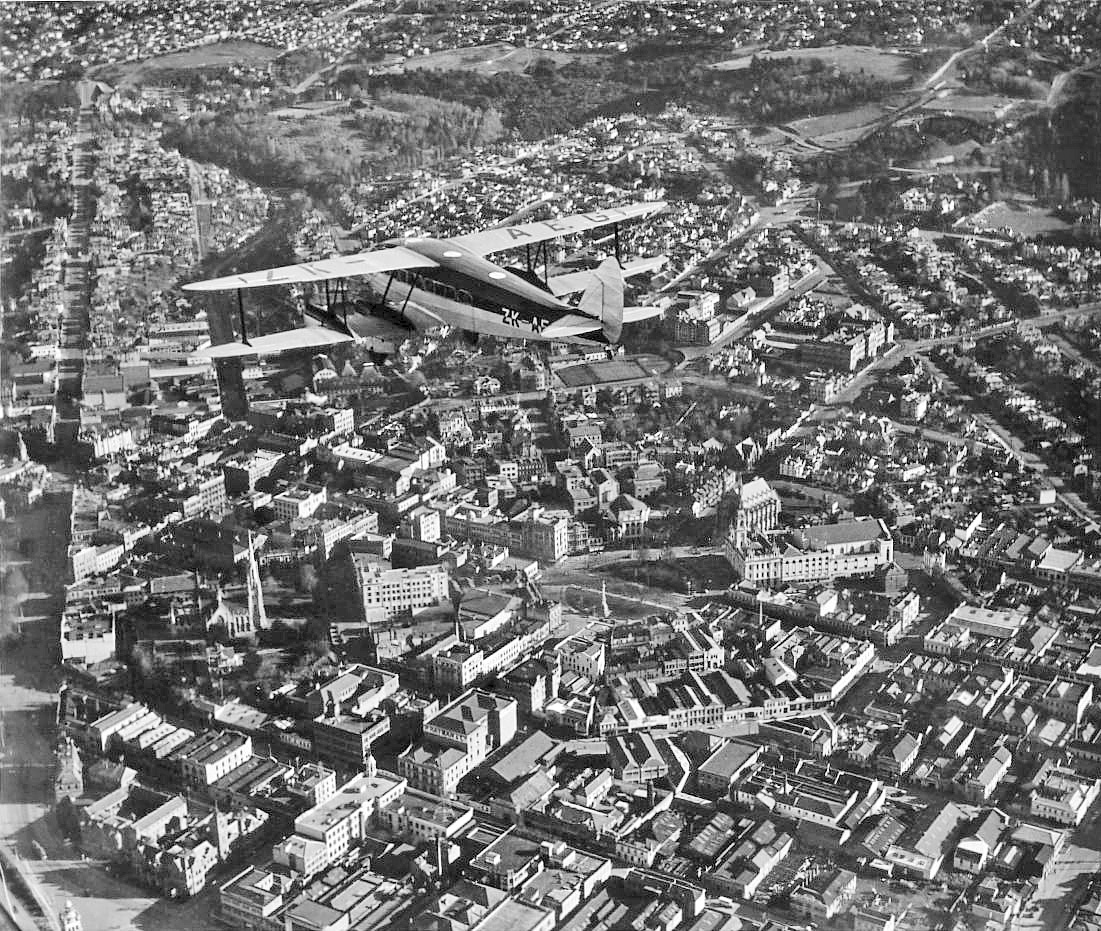
A De Havilland DH86 Express flies over central Dunedin during the 1930s. In this picture, looking west, The Octagon is the clear circular area just below the centre of the photo.

=== Early years ===
The Octagon was first laid out during Charles Kettle's surveying of the city in 1846. His plans for the centre of Dunedin included a large Octagonal area (Moray Place) enclosing a smaller octagonal space, originally designated as a reserve. This status was embodied in law in 1854, six years after the arrival of the first European settlers to the city. At this stage in Dunedin's history the area was officially designated as "the Square of Moray Place", though it was colloquially known as the Octagon even then.

Despite the reserve status, the Anglican Church sought to build in the centre of the Octagon, applying directly to Governor Sir George Grey. It was not until construction was about to begin that the local (predominantly Presbyterian) community became aware of what was happening. This resulted in a major furore. Otago Superintendent William Cargill was put in charge of resolving the dispute, which resulted in the Anglicans being forced to withdraw their plans for The Octagon. (The Anglican St. Paul's Cathedral stands today at its northern edge.)

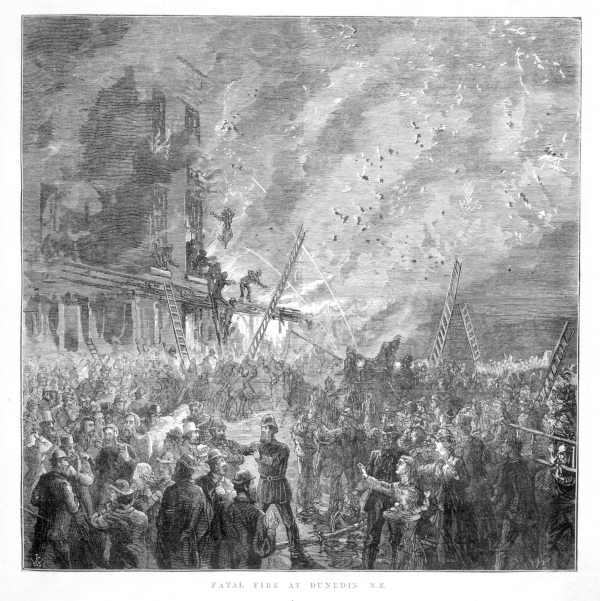
The 1879 Cafe Chantant fire

For many years, the site was somewhat derelict, with little done to improve the condition of the reserve. Early central Dunedin was divided by the body of Bell Hill, which rose immediately to the south of The Octagon. It was only with the making of a cutting through the hill and the later removal of most of it to allow traffic to move easily between the northern and southern parts of the central city along Princes Street that The Octagon began to gain any prominence. Even so, it remained unsightly until the 1890s.

The first major structure of any kind in The Octagon's reserve area was a monument erected in 1864 to the memory of Cargill. This was moved several hundred metres to The Exchange in 1872 to allow for the construction of a central roadway connecting Princes Street and George Street. In 1887 a statue of the poet Robert Burns, the uncle of one of the city's founding fathers, was unveiled. It still stands at the western edge of The Octagon close to the junction with Stuart Street.

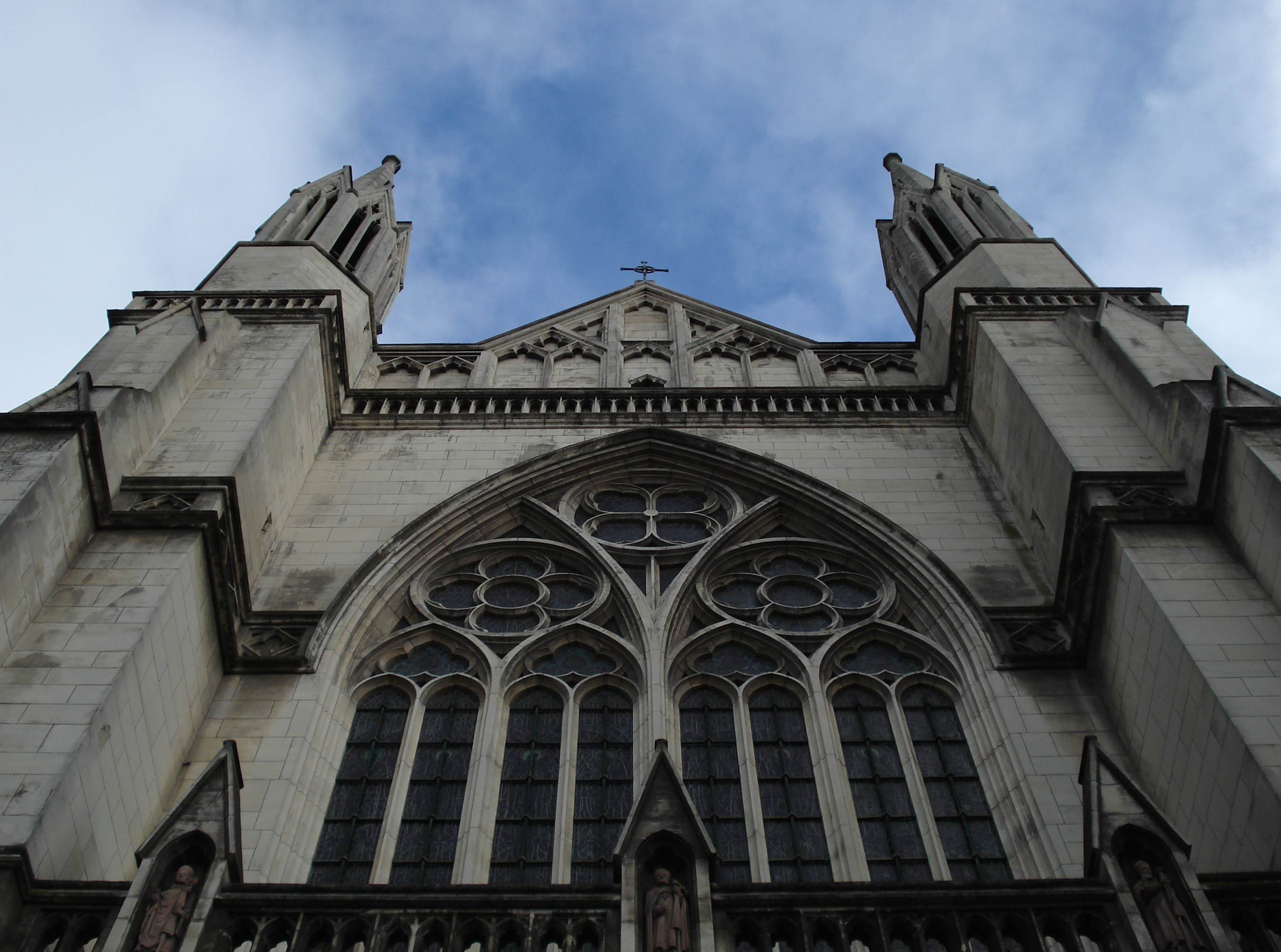
St Paul's Cathedral, Dunedin, August 2006

=== 1879 fire ===
On 8 September 1879, a fire broke out in the Cafe Chantant in the lower Octagon and spread to other properties within the Ross Building. The cafe had a bad reputation and the proprietor William Waters was under threat of arrest. The building was full at the time of the fire, and escape from the building was difficult. In all, a dozen people died in the blaze, including Robert Wilson, editor of the Otago Witness and his family. Waters was later charged with setting fire to the building for insurance purposes. The disaster was the biggest single loss of life in New Zealand due to fire until the destruction of Seacliff Mental Hospital some 63 years later.

The site of the blaze is now occupied by the Regent Theatre, which is reputed to be haunted, possibly by victims of the fire.

=== Since the 1890s ===
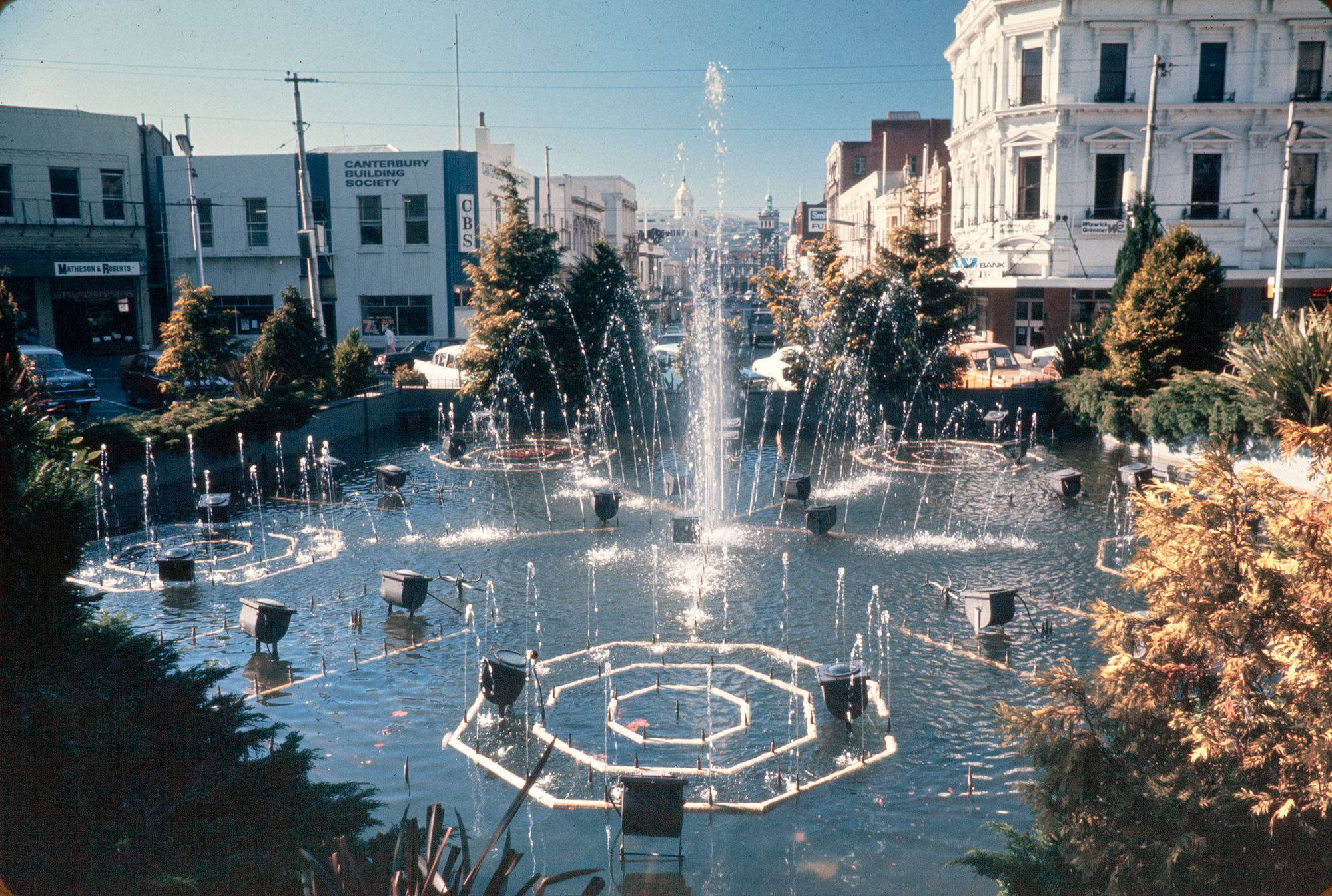
The Star Fountain in operation in 1977

In the early 1890s several improvements were proposed to The Octagon, including fencing, and the planting of plane trees along the edge of the central roadway. About this time a monument was also erected to early settler Thomas Burns, though this monument, erected in 1891, was generally unpopular and was eventually removed during the 1940s. Subterranean public toilets were installed close to the monument in 1910, though these were filled in during the 1970s.

In 1963, the council was given £5,000 by the Evening Star newspaper to build a fountain in the Octagon. The Star Fountain, as it became known after its installation in 1966, was a popular attraction, with synchronised lighting, music, and water displays, which played at regular times of the morning and evening. Despite its popularity, it was also unsightly during times when it was not playing, due to the large number of visible pipes needed for its performances. When The Octagon was refurbished in the 1990s, the Star Fountain was removed and was not included in The Octagon's new design, leading to some public outcry.

=== 1980s renovation ===
A plaque in Writers' Walk in The Octagon featuring the words of James K. Baxter

During the late 1980s, the Dunedin City Council commissioned consultants with a view to substantially renovating The Octagon area. The initial proposals included the closure of several sections of road around and within The Octagon, again resulting in public protest, and in the end, the renovations went ahead without any road closures.

The "new look" Octagon was in many ways an "old look", with covered walkways and Edwardian-style streetlights and fittings giving an antique look to the central city. This was designed to complement the many late Victorian and Edwardian buildings which surround The Octagon.

The improvements also included the paving of a plaza area in the lower Octagon (an area now regularly used for street performances and markets). The renovation of The Octagon, and particularly the addition of a plaza area, has seen an increase in al fresco dining in The Octagon, which is now a major hub for Dunedin's restaurant and cafe culture.

Renovation of The Octagon also saw the installation of two walks featuring large plaques embedded in the paving. The larger of these, the Dunedin Writers' Walk, features plaques inscribed with words from notable Dunedin writers and words about Dunedin by famous visiting writers. This walk extends around much of the upper Octagon. A second, smaller, walk along the central carriageway of The Octagon features plaques dedicated to Dunedin-born or -based Olympic medallists.

=== Barnes Dance ===
In March 2018, Barnes Dance crossings were introduced at the Octagon's southwestern and northeastern junctions (with Princes Street and George Street). They became the city's first Barnes Dance crossing for over 20 years (the last previously being at Cargill's Corner in South Dunedin), and the pilot for a scheme which saw several more such crossings put in place by the end of the year.

== See also ==
- Aotea Square, Auckland
- Civic Square, Wellington
- Cathedral Square, Christchurch
