= Otago Witness =

New Zealand newspaper 1851–1932

- Type: Weekly newspaper
- Format: Broadsheet
- Founded: 1851
- Ceased publication: 1932
- Headquarters: Dunedin, New Zealand

The Otago Witness was a prominent illustrated weekly newspaper in the early years of the European settlement of New Zealand, produced in Dunedin, the provincial capital of Otago. Published weekly, it existed from 1851 to 1932. The introduction of the Otago Daily Times, followed by other daily newspapers in its circulation area, led it to focus on serving a rural readership in the lower South Island, where poor road access prevented newspapers being delivered daily. It also provided an outlet for local fiction writers. It is notable as the first newspaper to use illustrations and photographs and was the first New Zealand newspaper to provide a correspondence column for children, which was known as "Dot's Little Folk". Together with the Auckland-based Weekly News and the Wellington-based New Zealand Free Lance it was one of the most significant illustrated weekly New Zealand newspapers in the 19th and early 20th centuries.

== History ==
=== Background ===
Nine months after the first immigrant ships had arrived in Otago, Henry Graham published Otago's first newspaper on 13 December 1848, the fortnightly Otago News. Graham had working class sympathies and was not enamoured with existing class structures, nor with the Free Church of Scotland and its connections to the New Zealand Company, which he held in low regard. He was English and an Anglican, and together with his views, this meant he was not going to receive any sympathy or financial support from the Scottish leadership of the settlement. At the time the settlement had a population of approximately 500, and it is estimated that the publication at its peak had a maximum of 80 subscriptions.

Graham expressed views in his newspaper such as advocating for a 10-hour working day, suggesting that the province was suitable only for grazing and not the agriculture that settlement was being planned on. Matters deteriorated when he directly attacked the Free Church Association, the New Zealand Company and William Cargill accusing them of spreading misleading information about the prospects of Otago: This resulted in the cancellation of forty subscriptions. In June 1849 the newspaper began publishing weekly. In November 1849 the newspaper received a letter signed by 147 citizens (which was nearly every adult male in the Dunedin) in which they stated that they had no sympathy for the editor's views. Despite this, and even though Graham was ill with consumption (tuberculosis), the newspaper continued to be published until 21 December 1850. Graham died in February 1851.

=== Founding ===
James Macandrew, who was planning to immigrate to Otago, was aware of the Otago News and its combative relationship with the settlement's leadership and that the copies being circulated in the United Kingdom were undermining efforts at marketing Otago. As a businessman he was keen for the settlement to prosper, so soon after his arrival in Dunedin in January 1851 he joined a group of eleven leading citizens (the others being A. J. Burns, T. Burns, J. Cargill, William Cargill, William H. Cutten, J. R. Johnston, John Jones, Edward McGlashan, William H. Reynolds and W. H. Valpy) in providing the capital necessary to purchase the printing plant of the Otago News. Using the newly acquired printing plant, the first issue of the Otago Witness appeared in early February 1851, three years after the founding of the settlement, which by now had a population of 745. Committing itself to principles in agreement with those of the settlement's founders, its name was chosen to indicate the city's connection with Edinburgh, where the Edinburgh Witness was a popular paper.

After trying the plan of a many-jointed editorship, and finding it impracticable, the owners appointed the Englishman William H. Cutten to the editorship. Cutten was genial, witty and more of a pragmatist than Graham. Cutten was a lawyer by training – he had entered business becoming a merchant and auctioneer and lacking any practical printing experience. As well as holding down the editor's position, Cutten was also the publication's reporter, advertising canvasser, subscription collector and pressman, with the only assistance provided by J.B. Todd, who was the compositor. The two men with occasional help from volunteers were the only staff of the newspaper. On publication days people would come to watch the two men hand printing while they waited for their copy.

The Witness was originally a four-page fortnightly newspaper, becoming a weekly publication within its first year. In its early years the business struggled financially, which meant that it had to be heavily subsidised. Management of the newspaper by a committee of the eleven owners provided unwieldy, and management by a sub-committee of two of the owners was tried before, in 1852, the owners handed control to Cutten, who could only be removed by a vote of three-fourths of the owners based upon their shareholding. Cutten meanwhile was developing other mercantile activities. He later entered politics, serving on the Otago Provincial Council from 1853 and Parliament. With Cutten becoming increasingly occurred with his other activities, William Reynolds acted in his absence with the experienced compositor Daniel Campbell, who was bought out from Edinburgh to take responsibility for the newspaper's printing and publishing.

By 1855 the newspaper had a circulation of only 210 out of a population of 3,000. By 1856 it had expanded to six pages and a year later had eight pages. The newspaper however began showing at times signs of the partisanship that its predecessor had been accused of. The most notable example occurred when the newspaper objected to the Provincial Councils policy of continuing an immigration policy with an emphasis in line with Cargill's of encouraging Scottish Presbyterian settlers. Cutten had married Cargill's daughter, which lead to a falling out between the two until they reconciled. Generally, however, the newspaper supported Cargill, who was the province's first superintendent. The Witness' early issues gained some notoriety for its polemical editorials, which were often skewed in favour of the political views and policies of Dunedin founding father Captain William Cargill, but it soon became a more balanced journal.

The Witness had no opposition until a strong antipathy developed between Cutten and James Macandrew, who had political ambitions. This led Macandrew to financially support the experienced English printer William Lambert to move from Auckland to launch the Otago Colonist, which from mid-1857 was supporting Macandrew's views and political career.

=== Impact of the Otago Daily Times ===
In 1861 Julius Vogel (later Sir Julius) immigrated to Dunedin during the boom following the discovery of gold at the Tuapeka, the first of the Otago goldrushes. After initially working for a few weeks at the Otago Colonist, he left and joined Otago Witness as editor and also became its co-owner when he purchased a half share in the business from Cutten, the business becoming Cullen and Vogel. Vogel convinced Cutten that due to the rapidly increasing population due to the gold rush now was the time to publish a daily newspaper, which they did in 1861 when they launched the daily Otago Daily Times. It soon had a circulation of 2,750 compared with the 250 of the Otago Witness.

Both the Witness and ODT were originally published from premises in Princes Street. On 1 December 1861 a fire swept through the premises. William Lambert offered the use of his printing plant, with the condition that as he was deeply religious they could use it until after midnight on what was to him the sacrosanct Sunday. While this restriction reduced the content of the Monday edition of the daily ODT it had no impact on its weekly sister.

Despite the competition introduced by ODT, the boom in Otago's wealth and population which followed the 1861 Otago gold rush dramatically improved the financial health of Witness and secured its future. By 1864 it had expanded to 24 pages and was selling 4,500 copies a week. In that same year the 6 February edition featured its first linograph, that of George Parr's touring All-England cricket eleven. During this time a special gold fields edition of the paper was regularly being published. It was being widely distributed throughout the South Island.

Vogel, who was editor of both newspapers, identified that the completion of telegraph lines as the country was opened up gave the daily ODT an advantage. The completion of a telegraph line from Campbelltown later Bluff) to Dunedin in August 1862 in particular allowed the ODT to gain quicker access to international news from ships arriving at Bluff before coming to Dunedin. As more telegraph lines were opened, it gave a daily newspaper the ability to more quickly convey the latest news to the public than a weekly newspaper. As a result, the Witness declined in importance relative to its daily sister and it slowly became a digest of reprints from its daily sister and original material oriented towards rural readers. By 1864 this original material began to include fiction which would appeal to woman such as a serialisation over 35 issues of Sir Massingberd sourced from Chamber's Journal. It was then followed by Lord Oakburn's Draughters by the popular novelist Ellen Wood.

Cutten sold his share in both the publications to Vogel in November 1864. Vogel took on Benjamin Farjeon as his junior partner in what became J. Vogel & Co.

By early 1865 with the business struggling financially and Vogel beginning his political career, Farjeon and Vogel in March 1865 sold a majority shareholding in the business to a number of prominent Dunedin citizens on the condition that they were kept on as manager and editor respectively. The new owners formed a public company in 1860, the Otago Daily Times and Witness Newspapers Co. Ltd, with Vogel, John Bathgate, F. C. Simmons and James Rattray as directors.

Vogel was subsequently forced out of the business in April 1868.

=== Takeover ===
In 1878 ownership of both the Witness and the ODT were taken over by George Fenwick and George McCullagh Reed, with Reed becoming the editor of both publications. George Fenwick's brother William Fenwick (1851–1906), who had previously worked at a number of publications including the Cromwell Argus (1869–1872), Otago Guardian (1873–1877) and Dunedin Evening News (which was later renamed the Age), became printer of the Witness.

In 1878 in response to a downturn in the Otago economy George Fenwick and Reed converted their business into a public company called the Otago Daily Times and Witness Newspapers Company, Ltd. Following the death of editor Robert Wilson, his wife and four of their six children in the Octagon fire of 8 September 1879, William Fenwick was appointed as his replacement and remained in this position for 27 years until his death in 1906. He greatly expanded the publication both in size, circulation and content from 28 pages with an occasional four-page supplement to issues typically of 34 pages and sometimes 92 pages, of which eight were devoted to illustrations. Its original masthead, which had been designed by the Dunedin engraver James Brown, was replaced on 26 July 1879 with a more elaborate specially design one.

In April 1886 it moved from publishing on a Saturday to a Friday before moving in January 1889 to a Thursday, then in September 1900 to a Wednesday.

Although conservative in its views, by the latter half of the nineteenth century the Witness provided an important outlet for local fiction writers with stories appearing such as Louie A. Dawson's A Gentleman of the Slums (1893), Fabian Bell's The Wonder Stone or Arita's Vengeance (1893) and Fred Morris's Castle Ludlow or Thrown Away (1894).

=== Twentieth century ===
The publication received its first Linotype machines in 1899.

The number of pages increased from thirty-two in 1886 to seventy-two in 1900 and ninety by 1908. It became known for its lavishly illustrated Christmas editions, whose covers and some inside pages were in colour. These were particularly popular among the rural readership of Otago and Southland. For an example, the 1893 Christmas issue had a circulation of 13,500 and twelve fictional stories, one of which was written by the noted journalist Jessie Mackay.

By the early twentieth century, the publication typically featured a wide range of literary and news content, including a cartoon, photographs and between eight and twelve pages of half-tone engravings. The illustrations and photographs were often double page. During the latter half of the First World War, the publication printed studio portraits of the killed, wounded and missing in action, which often covered several pages. These were obtained from the formal studio portraits that the soldiers had sat for prior to departure.

Following the death of Fenwick in 1906, Charles Fraser replaced him as editor and was succeeded by J. T. Paul, who remained in the position until the closing of the publication.

The popularity of the Witness declined during the early twentieth century due to competition from other forms of broadcast, notably radio, and improved roads which allowed its daily rivals the Otago Daily Times and Evening Star to reach more and more rural readers. The Witness eventually stopped publication on 28 June 1932, having published 4,085 issues. During its life the publication had made a notable contribution to the development of New Zealand writers by publishing short stories, serial and verse from local writers.

== Development of a children's readership ==
Under the editorship of Robert Wilson the Witness began a children's column in November 1876. Called "Children's Corner" it tried to be educational and interactive, with a number of competitions, though it did not incorporate correspondence. Most of the material was sourced from overseas publications, in particular Harpers and the New York Tribune. It appeared weekly until in July 1879 appearances became irregular and then only within the context of the ladies page.

The column continued under Wilson's successor, Fenwick, with no change to the format of a poem, a story and riddles. In October 1882 it was renamed "Our Little Folks" and published stories and poems, though none of them were from children. It was reshaped as "Dot’s Little Folks" in July 1886 following the hiring of Louisa Alice Baker. Under Baker the Witness became the first New Zealand newspaper to provide a correspondence column for children as she developed it into a highly interactive column dedicated to supporting and improving children's composition. Baker also developed the "Alice" byline, which was designed to appeal to woman. She moved to England in 1894 but continued to write for the Witness from there. Despite his duties as editor, William Fenwick took over the "Dot" byline from 1893 for 12 years. Fenwick took a personal interest in the publication's youthful correspondents and was successful in fostering a sense of club membership.

Members of what became "Dot's Little Folk" chose their own pseudonyms (though they had to supply their full names and addresses) and received badges (with approximately 4,000 "D.L.F" being issued). "Dot" would often print a short response at the end of a correspondent's letter.

While "Dot's Little Folk" was at first initially dominated by children aged 6 to 12, by 1897 teens had started to fill the column with letters and by the 1900s were using it to write about their lives, interact with each other and organise social events. From 1900 to 1914 "Dot's Little Folk" was at its height with 2,500 to 3,000 letters a year a year being published in a column that was four entire spreads in length. While the majority of contributors were New Zealanders, correspondence was also received from Australia, Great Britain and the United States.

Following Fenwick's death in 1906, his niece Linda Fenwick (died 1962), who had been previously assisting him, took over as Dot until 1913. Following her marriage she was succeeded as "Dot" by Ethel, the daughter of the then editor, Charles Fraser. Following Ethel Fraser's departure from the Witness in 1924, the associate editor, Eileen Louise Soper, served as "Dot" and wrote for the children's pages until the Witness ceased publication. Soper subsequently moved to the Otago Daily Times, where she continued the "Dot's Little Folk" tradition until the end of the 1930s. A shortage of paper due to the war forced the Otago Daily Times to reduce its size by dropping, among other features, the "Dot's Little Folk" column, with the last one appearing on 30 December 1941. The author Janet Frame's first published writings appeared when she was 10 in the form of letters and poems to "Dot".

The play "Where once our voices led: A nostalgic comedy", based upon the letters of the correspondent "High School Boy” to "Dot's Little Folk", was written and directed by Keith Scott and was performed at the Globe Theatre in Dunedin in August 2013.

The author Keith Scott told the story of the "Dot" children's correspondence column in his 2011 book Dear Dot – I must tell you: A personal history of young New Zealanders.

== Images ==
The Witness was the country's first newspaper to start publishing photos from the mid-1850s, which gained its popularity through its introduction of illustrations. These images form the basis of the Otago image collection, which since 2006 has been digitising these historic photos.

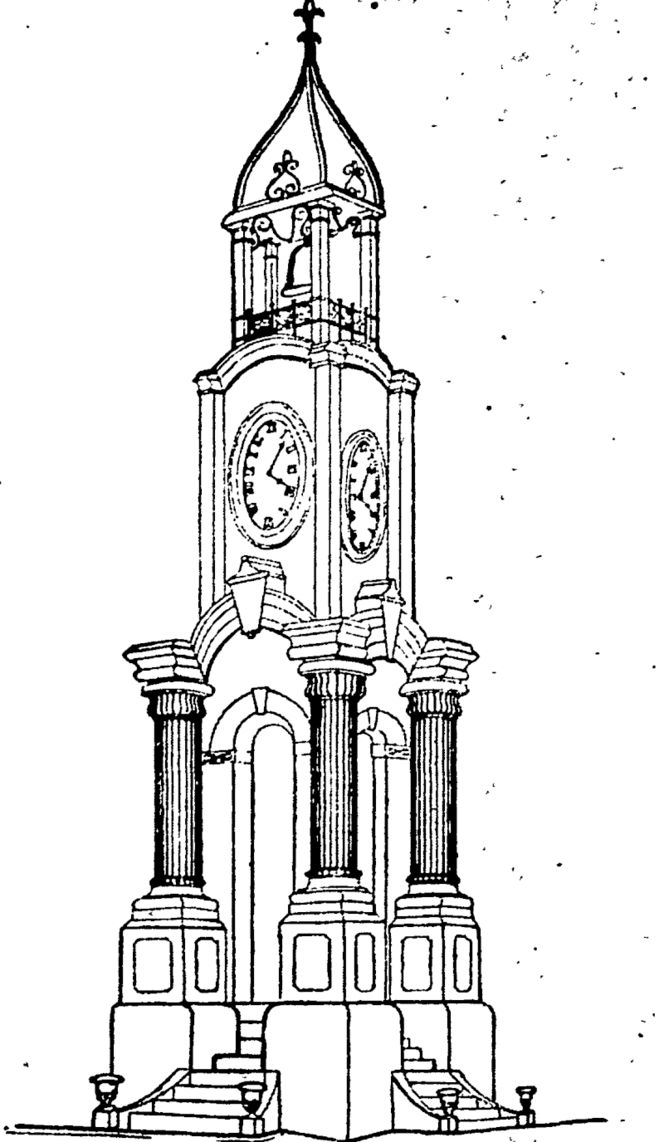
Sketch published in 1902 of the Hokitika Clock Tower, at the time under construction

== Digitisation ==
All issues of the Witness covering the years from 1851 to 1920 have been digitised and are available on the Papers Past website. In 2020 the National Library of New Zealand accepted a proposal from the Dunedin Public Libraries to partner in digitising the issues from January 1921 to December 1926. The Dunedin Public Libraries have a complete collection on microfiche of all issues of the Witness.
